= List of The King of Fighters video games =

The King of Fighters is a series of fighting games developed by SNK. Originally, the series was developed for SNK's Neo Geo MVS arcade systems. This would continue to be the main platform for King of Fighters games until 2004, when SNK Playmore adopted the Atomiswave arcade system as its primary board. SNK Playmore has since stated that it will release its latest arcade titles for the Taito Type X2 arcade system.

The first game in the series, The King of Fighters '94 was released by SNK on August 25, 1994. The game was originally designed to be a dream match of characters from the company's various arcade titles, particularly Fatal Fury, Art of Fighting, Ikari Warriors, and Psycho Soldier. Sequels from the series have been released each year until The King of Fighters 2003. By 2004, SNK abandoned yearly releases of the series and numbered future games in a more traditional manner. In 2004, SNK produced the first 3D installment of the series, The King of Fighters: Maximum Impact. The game, and its two sequels, revises much of the backstory for characters and settings from previous games.

Several characters from the series also appear in cross-over video games such as the Capcom vs. SNK series. In addition to the remakes of individual games such as Re-bout, Ultimate Match, and Unlimited Match, SNK Playmore has released compilations of their KOF games.

== Main series ==
=== Orochi Saga ===
Game	Details
The King of Fighters '94 Original release date(s): Japan: 25 August 1994	Release years by system: 1994 – Arcade; 1994 – Neo Geo; 1994 – Neo Geo CD; 2004 – PlayStation 2; 2008 – Virtual Console; 2010 – PlayStation 3; 2011 – PlayStation Portable
The King of Fighters '94 Original release date(s): Japan: 25 August 1994	Notes: The game was remade and released in 2004 for the PlayStation 2 as The King of Fighters '94 Re-Bout in Japan. This version has several new features like hi-res graphics, online play, team edit, a playable Rugal Bernstein, and the addition of Saisyu Kusanagi.
The King of Fighters '95 Original release date(s): Japan: 25 July 1995	Release years by system: 1995 – Arcade; 1995 – Neo Geo; 1995 – Neo Geo CD; 1996 – Sega Saturn; 1996 – PlayStation; 1996 – Game Boy; 2010 – Virtual Console; 2011 – PSN
The King of Fighters '95 Original release date(s): Japan: 25 July 1995	Notes: Introduces the team edit feature which allows players to create their own three-character team.; Ported to the Sega Saturn in Japan. The Saturn port requires a packed in ROM expansion cartridge to run.; Nakoruru of Samurai Shodown is exclusive in Game Boy.
The King of Fighters '96 Original release date(s): Japan: 30 July 1996	Release years by system: 1996 – Arcade; 1996 – Neo Geo; 1996 – Neo Geo CD; 1996 – Sega Saturn; 1997 – PlayStation; 1997 – Game Boy; 2011 – PSN
The King of Fighters '96 Original release date(s): Japan: 30 July 1996	Notes: Ported to the PlayStation and Sega Saturn in Japan. The Saturn port requires a memory expansion cartridge to run, which also makes it arcade perfect. It contains the ability to play as Chizuru and Goenitz using a code.; Mr. Karate, an alter-ego of Takuma is Game Boy exclusive.
The King of Fighters '97 Original release date(s): Japan: 28 July 1997	Release years by system: 1997 – Arcade; 1997 – Neo Geo; 1997 – Neo Geo CD; 1997 – Sega Saturn; 1998 – PlayStation
The King of Fighters '97 Original release date(s): Japan: 28 July 1997	Notes: Ported to the PlayStation and Sega Saturn in Japan. The Saturn port requires a memory expansion cartridge to run. It contains a special art gallery feature as well as the ability to play as Orochi using a code. This game was never released in the US.
The King of Fighters '98 Original release date(s): Japan: 23 July 1998	Release years by system: 1998 – Arcade; 1998 – Neo Geo; 1998 – Neo Geo CD; 1999 – PlayStation; 1999 – Dreamcast; 2008 – PlayStation 2; 2009 – Xbox 360 Marketplace
The King of Fighters '98 Original release date(s): Japan: 23 July 1998	Notes: Ported to the PlayStation and Dreamcast. SNK refitted the Dreamcast version (renamed The King of Fighters: Dream Match 1999) with an extended hand-animated introduction, link-up capability with KOF R-2 for the Neo Geo Pocket Color, and 3D backgrounds.; Separate from the KOF story line, this dream match contains fighters from all previous King of Fighters games except for Eiji Kisaragi, Kasumi Todoh, Goenitz and the Boss Team (Geese Howard, Wolfgang Krauser, and Mr. Big) from KOF '96. Saisyu Kusanagi also makes his first appearance as a non-secret playable character.; Like KOF '94, this game was also remade and released in 2008 for the PlayStation 2 as The King of Fighters '98 Ultimate Match in Japan. Like its '94 counterpart, the update features redesigned backgrounds, online play, and new characters (Eiji Kisaragi, Kasumi Todoh and the boss team from KOF '96 among others).

=== NESTS Saga ===
Game	Details
The King of Fighters '99 Original release date(s): Japan: 22 July 1999	Release years by system: 1999 – Arcade; 1999 – Neo Geo; 1999 – Neo Geo CD; 2000 – PlayStation; 2000 – Dreamcast
The King of Fighters '99 Original release date(s): Japan: 22 July 1999	Notes: Introduces the striker system, which allows the player to call on a teammate to aid the current fighter.; Ported to the Dreamcast and the PlayStation in the US. The Dreamcast version was titled The King of Fighters: Evolution, while the PlayStation retained the '99 namesake. In the Dreamcast version (regarded as the better port of the two, due to its massive visual updating), Seth and Vanessa are hidden strikers, and Krizalid is a selectable character (only in his second form).
The King of Fighters 2000 Original release date(s): Japan: 26 July 2000	Release years by system: 2000 – Arcade; 2000 – Neo Geo; 2002 – Dreamcast; 2002 – PlayStation 2
The King of Fighters 2000 Original release date(s): Japan: 26 July 2000	Notes: This game was ported to the Dreamcast and the PlayStation 2. The US/North American and European PS2 was bundled together with The King of Fighters 2001.; Allows the player to select alternates as strikers instead of just playable characters.; Marks the last installment to be produced by SNK before the bankruptcy, but not the series.
The King of Fighters 2001 Original release date(s): Japan: 15 November 2001	Release years by system: 2001 – Arcade; 2002 – Neo Geo; 2002 – Dreamcast; 2003 – PlayStation 2
The King of Fighters 2001 Original release date(s): Japan: 15 November 2001	Notes: In this version, the player decides on how many out of four fighters will participate in a match, the power gauge stock increase depend on how many Strikers are added.
The King of Fighters 2002 Original release date(s): Japan: 10 October 2002	Release years by system: 2002 – Arcade; 2002 – Neo Geo; 2003 – Dreamcast; 2004 – PlayStation 2; 2005 – Xbox; 2010 – Xbox 360 Marketplace
The King of Fighters 2002 Original release date(s): Japan: 10 October 2002	Notes: The North American PS2 and Xbox releases are bundled together with The King of Fighters 2003.; An update/remake was released in 2009 in Japan on the PlayStation 2 retitled The King of Fighters 2002 Unlimited Match. Among the major changes include a replacement character for K9999 named "Nameless". Numerous additional characters from elsewhere in the series were added to the original roster with a complete roster size of 66, the largest roster in the history of the series.

=== Ash Saga ===
Game	Details
The King of Fighters 2003 Original release date(s): Japan: 12 December 2003	Release years by system: 2003 - Arcade; 2004 - Neo Geo; 2004 - PlayStation 2; 2005 - Xbox
The King of Fighters 2003 Original release date(s): Japan: 12 December 2003	Notes: Unlike previous games, KOF 2003 employs a tag team battle system.; It is the final annual update to the series as well as the final installment to be released for the NeoGeo MVS and AES systems; the next game was not released until two years later.; Intended for release on the Dreamcast. Development was however terminated, as the system had run its course and re-coding the engine would have been too costly.
The King of Fighters XI Original release date(s): Japan: 26 October 2005	Release years by system: 2005 – Arcade; 2006 – PlayStation 2
The King of Fighters XI Original release date(s): Japan: 26 October 2005	Notes: The game was released in Japan for the PlayStation 2 on June 22, 2006. This version updates the current game with additional music and stages, as well as an updated character roster with the reinclusion of Mai Shiranui, Geese Howard, EX Kyo, Robert Garcia, Mr. Big and new arrivals to the KOF arena, Hotaru Futaba and Tung Fu Rue.; The game was released in Europe in July 2007 and in the U.S. in October 2007
The King of Fighters XII Original release date(s): Japan: 10 April 2009	Release years by system: 2009 – Arcade; 2009 – PlayStation 3, Xbox 360
The King of Fighters XII Original release date(s): Japan: 10 April 2009	Notes: The game will be the first in the series since KOF '96 to use completely new 2D graphics; Unlike previous entries in the series, The King of Fighters XII forgoes the team structure of previous games and all characters appear as solo entrants. The roster is set at 20 characters, the smallest roster in the history of the series.; The producer has revealed that the character count will be boosted for the home console releases.
The King of Fighters XIII Original release date(s): Japan: 14 July 2010	Release years by system: 2010 – Arcade; 2011 – PlayStation 3, Xbox 360; 2013 – Microsoft Windows; 2023 - Nintendo Switch, Playstation 4
The King of Fighters XIII Original release date(s): Japan: 14 July 2010	Notes: All characters, including console exclusive characters, from The King of Fighters XII return. Mai Shiranui, Yuri Sakazaki, King, K', Maxima, Kula Diamond, Vice and Takuma Sakazaki return as additional characters.; Billy Kane returns as an unlockable character.; Hwa Jai from Fatal Fury and Saiki, the final boss, are new arrivals.; Downloadable content characters are Kyo Kusanagi's NESTS-Style version, Iori Yagami's With the Power of Flames version and Mr. Karate's Honki ni Natta form from SNK vs. Capcom: SVC Chaos

=== New Age Saga ===
Game	Details
The King of Fighters XIV Original release date(s): NA: 23 August 2016	Release years by system: 2016 – PlayStation 4; 2017 – Microsoft Windows; 2017 – Arcade
The King of Fighters XIV Original release date(s): NA: 23 August 2016	Notes: It is the first game to use entirely 3D graphics in the main series, which had previously been only the Maximum Impact spin-off series; For the first time in the KOF history, this installment has the most number of newcomers.; This is the first main entry in the KOF series to not have an arcade version on its debut release.; The King of Fighters XI PS2 exclusive character, Tung Fu Rue, returns but as one of the main playable characters this time.; The King of Fighters '95 Game Boy exclusive and The King of Fighters 2000 Striker exclusive character, Nakoruru, returns but as one of the main playable characters this time.
The King of Fighters XV Original release dates: WW: February 17, 2022	Release years by system: 2022 - PlayStation 4, PlayStation 5, Xbox Series X/S, Microsoft Windows
The King of Fighters XV Original release dates: WW: February 17, 2022	Notes: Newcomers Isla and Dolores join Heidern to form Team Rival.; Krohnen McDougall (a new name for K9999) forms Team Krohnen with Kula Diamond and Ángel.; Haohmaru and Darli Dagger join Nakoruru to form Team Samurai.

== Spin-offs ==
=== Fighting ===
Game	Details
King of Fighters R-1 Original release date(s):	Release years by system:
King of Fighters R-1 Original release date(s):	Notes: An adaptation of The King of Fighters '97 for the Neo Geo Pocket.
King of Fighters R-2 Original release date(s):	Release years by system:
King of Fighters R-2 Original release date(s):	Notes: An adaptation of The King of Fighters '98 for the Neo Geo Pocket Color. Linkable with KOF '99 Dream Match for the Dreamcast.
The King of Fighters EX: Neo Blood Original release date(s): Japan: 1 January 2002; Europe: 2002-08-23; NA: 2002	Release years by system: 2002 – Game Boy Advance
The King of Fighters EX: Neo Blood Original release date(s): Japan: 1 January 2002; Europe: 2002-08-23; NA: 2002	Notes: An adaptation of The King of Fighters '99 for the Game Boy Advance, with a new story and new character named Moe Habana. Geese Howard is the final boss with Iori being a sub boss.
The King of Fighters EX2: Howling Blood Original release date(s): Japan: 1 January 2003; NA: December 11, 2003	Release years by system: 2003 – Game Boy Advance; 2005 – Nokia N-Gage
The King of Fighters EX2: Howling Blood Original release date(s): Japan: 1 January 2003; NA: December 11, 2003	Notes: An adaptation of The King of Fighters 2000 for the Game Boy Advance with a new story, a returning Moe Habana, new characters Reiji Okami, Jun Kagami, Miu Kurosaki, and Sinobu as the final boss, and a new stage.; It was ported to the Nokia N-Gage as the retitled The King of Fighters: Extreme.; Named the best Game Boy Advance game of January 2004 by GameSpot.
The King of Fighters: Neowave Original release date(s): Japan: 30 July 2004; Europe: 2006-10-13; NA: 2006-04-18	Release years by system: 2004 – Arcade; 2006 – PlayStation 2; 2006 – Xbox
The King of Fighters: Neowave Original release date(s): Japan: 30 July 2004; Europe: 2006-10-13; NA: 2006-04-18	Notes: An adaptation of The King of Fighters 2002 for the Atomiswave arcade hardware, with new background graphics and music, and some changes to gameplay.
KOF: Maximum Impact Original release date(s): Japan: 12 August 2004; NA: 2004-08-12; Europe: 2005-07-01; Australia: 2005	Release years by system: 2004 – PlayStation 2; 2005 – Xbox
KOF: Maximum Impact Original release date(s): Japan: 12 August 2004; NA: 2004-08-12; Europe: 2005-07-01; Australia: 2005	Notes: It was ported to the Xbox as KOF: Maximum Impact - Maniax with additional content, dual-language audio tracks, and online play via Xbox Live.
KOF: Maximum Impact 2 Original release date(s): Japan: 19 June 2006; NA: 19 September 2006	Release years by system: 2006 – PlayStation 2
KOF: Maximum Impact 2 Original release date(s): Japan: 19 June 2006; NA: 19 September 2006	Notes: Known in Northern America as The King of Fighters 2006.; The game was also packaged with a bonus DVD of The King of Fighters: Another Day, supposedly a prequel leading up to the Maximum Impact 2 and involved characters from The King of Fighters XI.; It was remade as KOF Maximum Impact: Regulation A but with new characters and the classic 3-on-3 gameplay as seen in the 2D KOF main series.
KOF Maximum Impact: Regulation A Original release date(s): Japan: 26 July 2007	Release years by system: 2007 – Arcade; 2007 – PlayStation 2
KOF Maximum Impact: Regulation A Original release date(s): Japan: 26 July 2007	Notes: It was remade from Maximum Impact and Maximum Impact 2 but with new characters and with the classic 3-on-3 gameplay as seen in the 2D KOF main series.; A planned arcade sequel to Regulation A that was due for release in 2008 but was cancelled. A PlayStation 2 port was also planned but subsequently cancelled.
The King of Fighters '95 Original release date(s):	Release years by system: 1996 – Game Boy
The King of Fighters '95 Original release date(s):	Notes: Known in Japan as Nettou The King of Fighters '95.; Known in North America and Europe as The King of Fighters '95.; An adaptation of The King of Fighters '95 for the Game Boy, which features Nakoruru from Samurai Shodown.
The King of Fighters: Heat of Battle Original release date(s):	Release years by system: 1997 – Game Boy
The King of Fighters: Heat of Battle Original release date(s):	Notes: Known in Japan as Nettou The King of Fighters '96.; Known in Europe as The King of Fighters: Heat of Battle.; An adaptation of The King of Fighters '96 for the Game Boy, which featured the Orochi awakened versions of Leona and Iori Yagami.
The King of Fighters-i Original release date(s): July 20, 2011	Release years by system: 2011 – iOS: iPhone, iPod Touch, iPad
The King of Fighters-i Original release date(s): July 20, 2011	Notes: The first KoF game for the iOS platform but suffers from poor graphics and fewer characters due to limited storage capacity on the app.
The King of Fighters Android Original release date(s): March 23, 2012	Release years by system: 2012 – Android
The King of Fighters Android Original release date(s): March 23, 2012	Notes: Released on March 23, 2012. During the first release, only some devices are compatible such as Samsung Galaxy S II, Samsung Galaxy Tab 10.1 and Sony Ericsson Xperia Play. Although the English version of The King of Fighters is no longer available in Google Play but the Japanese version of the game remain available in Google Play.

=== Other ===
Game	Details
Quiz King of Fighters Original release date(s):	Release years by system: 1994 – Arcade; 1994 – Neo Geo; 1994 – Neo Geo CD
Quiz King of Fighters Original release date(s):	Notes: A KOF-themed quiz game released only in Japan for the Neo Geo. Roster includes select characters from Samurai Shodown.
The King of Fighters: Battle de Paradise Original release date(s):	Release years by system: 2000 – Neo Geo Pocket Color
The King of Fighters: Battle de Paradise Original release date(s):	Notes: A KOF-themed board game released for the Neo Geo Pocket.
The King of Fighters: Kyo Original release date(s): Japan: 1998-08-27	Release years by system: 1998 – PlayStation
The King of Fighters: Kyo Original release date(s): Japan: 1998-08-27	Notes: An RPG for the PlayStation, released only in Japan.
King of Fighters: Sky Stage Original release date(s): January 22, 2010	Release years by system: 2010 – Arcade; 2010 – Xbox Live Arcade
King of Fighters: Sky Stage Original release date(s): January 22, 2010	Notes: The first shooting game of The King of Fighters series.
The King of Fighters All Star Original release date(s): Japan: 2018-07-26; WW: 2019-10-22	Release years by system: 2018 – Android, iOS
The King of Fighters for Girls Original release date(s): Japan: 2019-11-08	Release years by system: 2019 – Android, iOS

== Expansions and remasters ==
The King of Fighters '94

Game	Details
The King of Fighters '94: Re-Bout Original release date(s): JP: 28 December 2004	Release years by system: 2004 - PlayStation 2
The King of Fighters '94: Re-Bout Original release date(s): JP: 28 December 2004	Notes:

The King of Fighters '95

Game	Details
The King of Fighters '95 (Orochi Collection) Original release date(s): JP: 20 April 2006	Release years by system: 2006 - PlayStation 2
The King of Fighters '95 (Orochi Collection) Original release date(s): JP: 20 April 2006	Notes:

The King of Fighters '96

Game	Details
The King of Fighters '96 (Orochi Collection) Original release date(s): JP: 20 April 2006	Release years by system: 2006 - PlayStation 2
The King of Fighters '96 (Orochi Collection) Original release date(s): JP: 20 April 2006	Notes:

The King of Fighters '97

Game	Details
The King of Fighters '97 (Orochi Collection) Original release date(s): JP: 20 April 2006	Release years by system: 2006 - PlayStation 2
The King of Fighters '97 (Orochi Collection) Original release date(s): JP: 20 April 2006	Notes:
The King of Fighters '97: Global Match Original release date(s): April 3, 2018	Release years by system:
The King of Fighters '97: Global Match Original release date(s): April 3, 2018	Notes:

The King of Fighters '98

Game	Details
The King of Fighters: Dream Match 1999 Original release date(s): October 16, 1999	Release years by system: 1999 - Dreamcast
The King of Fighters: Dream Match 1999 Original release date(s): October 16, 1999	Notes:
The King of Fighters '98 Ultimate Match Original release date(s): March 18, 2008	Release years by system:
The King of Fighters '98 Ultimate Match Original release date(s): March 18, 2008	Notes: This game was remade from The King of Fighters '98 and released in 2008 for the PlayStation 2 in Japan. The update features redesigned backgrounds, online play, and new characters (Eiji Kisaragi, Kasumi Todoh and the boss team from KOF '96 among others).
The King of Fighters '98 Ultimate Match Final Edition Original release date(s):	Release years by system:
The King of Fighters '98 Ultimate Match Final Edition Original release date(s):	Notes:

The King of Fighters '99

Game	Details
The King of Fighters '99: Evolution Original release date(s): 30 March 2000	Release years by system: 2000 - Dreamcast; 2002 - MS Windows
The King of Fighters '99: Evolution Original release date(s): 30 March 2000	Notes:

The King of Fighters 2000

Game	Details
The King of Fighters 2000 (Dreamcast) Original release date(s): 8 August 2002	Release years by system: 2000 - Dreamcast
The King of Fighters 2000 (Dreamcast) Original release date(s): 8 August 2002	Notes:

The King of Fighters 2001

Game	Details
The King of Fighters 2001 (Dreamcast) Original release date(s): 26 December 2002	Release years by system: 2001 - Dreamcast
The King of Fighters 2001 (Dreamcast) Original release date(s): 26 December 2002	Notes:

The King of Fighters 2002

Game	Details
The King of Fighters 2002 (Dreamcast) Original release date(s): JP: 19 June 2003	Release years by system: 2002 - Dreamcast
The King of Fighters 2002 (Dreamcast) Original release date(s): JP: 19 June 2003	Notes: Adds two more characters, King and Shingo Yabuki, not included in the Neo Geo MVS and AES release.
The King of Fighters 2002 (Xbox / PS2) Original release date(s): JP: 24 March 2005	Release years by system:
The King of Fighters 2002 (Xbox / PS2) Original release date(s): JP: 24 March 2005	Notes: In addition to King and Shingo Yabuki, adds three more characters, Orochi Iori, Goenitz and Geese Howard, not included in the Neo Geo MVS and AES release.
The King of Fighters 2002 Unlimited Match Original release date(s): JP: 26 February 2009	Release years by system:
The King of Fighters 2002 Unlimited Match Original release date(s): JP: 26 February 2009	Notes: An updated version of The King of Fighters 2002 was released in 2009 in Japan on the PlayStation 2. Among the major changes include a replacement character for K9999 named "Nameless". Numerous additional characters from elsewhere in the series were added to the original roster with a complete roster size of 66, the largest roster in the history of the series.

The King of Fighters XI

Game	Details
The King of Fighters XI (PS2) Original release date(s):	Release years by system: {{{release}}}

}}

The King of Fighters XII

Game	Details
The King of Fighters XII (PS3 / Xbox 360) Original release date(s):	Release years by system:
The King of Fighters XII (PS3 / Xbox 360) Original release date(s):	Notes:

The King of Fighters XIII

Game	Details
The King of Fighters XII: Climax Original release date(s):	Release years by system:
The King of Fighters XII: Climax Original release date(s):	Notes:
The King of Fighters XI: Global Edition Original release date(s):	Release years by system:
The King of Fighters XI: Global Edition Original release date(s):	Notes:

The King of Fighters XIV

Game	Details
The King of Fighters XIV: Ultimate Edition Original release date(s):	Release years by system:
The King of Fighters XIV: Ultimate Edition Original release date(s):	Notes:

== Compilations ==
Game	Details
The King of Fighters 2000/2001 Original release date(s): NA: 2003-12-09	Release years by system: 2003 – PlayStation 2
The King of Fighters 2000/2001 Original release date(s): NA: 2003-12-09	Notes: Contains The King of Fighters 2000 and 2001.
The King of Fighters 2002/2003 Original release date(s): NA: 2004-02-11	Release years by system: 2005 – PlayStation 2; 2004 – Xbox
The King of Fighters 2002/2003 Original release date(s): NA: 2004-02-11	Notes: Contains The King of Fighters 2002 and 2003.
KOF Collection: The Orochi Saga Original release date(s): Japan: 2006-04-20; NA: 2008-10-21	Release years by system: 2006 – PlayStation 2; 2008 – Wii; 2008 – PlayStation Portable
KOF Collection: The Orochi Saga Original release date(s): Japan: 2006-04-20; NA: 2008-10-21	Notes: Includes '94, '95, '96, '97, and '98.; '94 and '98 are not included in the Japan release.; Known in Japan as The King of Fighters: Orochi Collection.
The King of Fighters: NESTS Collection Original release date(s): Japan: 2007-04-19	Release years by system: 2007 – PlayStation 2
The King of Fighters: NESTS Collection Original release date(s): Japan: 2007-04-19	Notes: Contains The King of Fighters '99, '00 and '01

== Related games ==
Game	Details
SNK vs. Capcom: The Match of the Millennium Original release date(s): 1999	Release years by system: 1999 – Neo Geo Pocket Color 2021 – Nintendo Switch, Windows
Capcom vs. SNK: Millennium Fight 2000 Original release date(s): 2000	Release years by system: 2000 – Arcade, Dreamcast
Capcom vs. SNK Pro Original release date(s): 2001	Release years by system: 2001 – PlayStation
Capcom vs. SNK 2 Original release date(s): 2001	Release years by system: 2001 – Arcade, Dreamcast, PlayStation 2
Capcom vs. SNK 2 EO Original release date(s): 2002	Release years by system: 2002 – Xbox, GameCube
SNK vs. Capcom: SVC Chaos Original release date(s): 2003	Release years by system: 2003 – Arcade, Neo Geo AES, PlayStation 2 2004 – Xbox
NeoGeo Battle Coliseum Original release date(s): 2005	Release years by system: 2005 – Arcade, PlayStation 2 2010 – Xbox Live Arcade 2015 – PlayStation Network
Neo Geo Heroes: Ultimate Shooting Original release date(s): 2010	Release years by system: 2010 – PlayStation Portable
