= The King of Fighters XI =

2005 video game

- Arcade flyer for The King of Fighters XI
- Developers: SNK Playmore; G1M2 (PS2)
- Publishers: WW: Sega (Arcade); WW: SNK Playmore; EU: Ignition Entertainment
- Artists: Hiroaki Hashimoto; Nona
- Series: The King of Fighters
- Platforms: Arcade, PlayStation 2, PlayStation Network
- Release: Arcade; JP: October 26, 2005; NA: December 2005; PlayStation 2; JP: June 22, 2006; EU: July 6, 2007; NA: November 13, 2007; PlayStation Network; JP: December 17, 2014
- Genre: Fighting
- Modes: Single-player, multiplayer
- Arcade system: Atomiswave

The King of Fighters XI (Note: Japanese: ザ・キング・オブ・ファイターズ XI, Hepburn: Za Kingu Obu Faitāzu Irebun), also called KOF XI (or KOF 11), is a 2005 2D fighting game developed and published by SNK Playmore. It is the eleventh main installment in The King of Fighters series. Originally released as a coin-operated arcade game for the Atomiswave platform, a home version for the PlayStation 2 was released in Japan in 2006, followed by releases in the PAL region and North America in 2007. It is the second The King of Fighters game to not run on the Neo Geo following its predecessor, The King of Fighters Neowave, and also the first major canonical entry to not be named after its year of release.

The game is set after the events of The King of Fighters 2003 and the second part of Ash Crimson's story arc. The plot focuses on a mysterious group known as Those from the Past, who aims to obtain the power of the ancient demon Orochi. The player can choose from a total of forty characters, including characters from other SNK games; seven bonus characters from the crossover game Neo Geo Battle Coliseum are also included in the PS2 version. The game retains many elements from its predecessor, involving fights between six fighters who can tag during the battle. It also provides new features allowing the player to perform simultaneous multiple special moves.

Critical reception to The King of Fighters XI has been positive. Critics enjoyed the new fighting system, the balance between characters, as well as other elements that managed to improve upon its predecessor. However, the graphics were found to be dated due to the use of 2D pixel graphics, and journalists found the final bosses too complicated to defeat. Despite skeptical commercial expectations for the game, as it was being released on the PlayStation 2 when that console was being abandoned, it was still noted to sell well in Japan. KOF XI was succeeded by The King of Fighters XII in 2009, while a direct sequel to the game's storyline, The King of Fighters XIII, released in 2010.

== Gameplay ==
An example of the Dream Cancel feature. In the above picture, Kyo Kusanagi is using a Desperation Move against Gai Tendo, but changes into a Dream Cancel below in order to perform a stronger move.

The game retains the gameplay elements from The King of Fighters 2003 involving fights between six characters who can tag between members during battle. It also provides new features which allow the player to perform simultaneous multiple special moves. The four most substantial innovations The King of Fighters XI brings to the franchise are Quick Shift, Saving Shift, the Skill Bar and Dream Cancel. The Power Stocks that existed before are still present, and are filled through encounters within fighters. There are now Skill Stocks which gradually build up over time. Each team begins a match holding the maximum of two Skill Stocks. Offensive maneuvers, such as Desperation Moves, Guard Cancels, and Tag Attacks, continue to use Power Stocks; however, more defensive or tactical maneuvers, such as Guard Evasion, Saving Shift, and Quick Shift, use Skill Stocks.

The King of Fighters XI utilizes the Tactical Shift System from The King of Fighters 2003. The Quick Shift allows the player to change into another character in the middle of any combo, prolonging it, or in the middle of any attack, canceling the attack's animation frames if needed. The Saving Shift allows the player to take out a character when they are being hit, or as soon as they are hit, at the cost of both skill bars. The last new feature of The King of Fighters XI is the Dream Cancel. Like the Super Cancel that first appeared in The King of Fighters '99, Dream Cancel allows players to use stocks to interrupt a move in the midst of its execution, with a more powerful move, allowing for devastating combos.

Should the timer run down during a match, the winner is no longer decided based on remaining life; instead, the judgment bar, a new circular bar composed of two colors, each one representing a player, quantifies each player's skill. If none of the two teams manages to win by defeating all three characters from the opposite team, the placement of the judgement bar decides who the victor is. The judgment bar is affected by each attack in which the players are involved. Combos affect the bar more, and when a character of the opposing team is defeated, the bar changes significantly against that player. On the rare occasion when the bar is exactly in the center, the match will end in a draw and both sides will lose.

The PlayStation 2 port added multiple modes not present in the arcade version. The player can use the original The King of Fighters team mode where characters are not randomly tagged and instead fight in an order decided by the player. In Challenge Mode, the player is given multiple missions where they can unlock a total of seven characters from Neo Geo Battle Coliseum. There is also an Edit Mode, where the player can alter the appearance of each character and give them different colors, such as making Kyo Kusanagi shoot green flames instead of red.

== Plot ==
During the events of The King of Fighters 2003, Mukai, a member of the mysterious group Those from the Past, stole the seal belonging to the demon Orochi until being confronted by the Three Sacred Treasures composed of the returning heroes Kyo Kusanagi, Iori Yagami and Chizuru Kagura. Taking advantage of this situation, Ash Crimson attacked Kagura in her weakened state and stole the Yata Mirror from her, making Kyo swear revenge. In due time, a new tournament is established which follows the previous tournament's new rules, with both established fighters and newcomers participating in the competition. The hosts of the tournament are two members of Those from the Past, consisting of weapons expert Shion and dimension manipulator Magaki, who serve as the respective sub and final bosses of the game. Following their defeat, Magaki tries to escape by entering into another dimension, but instead ends up being killed by Shion's spear. In the ensuing chaos, Ash attacks a rampaging Iori (affected by the Riot of the Blood curse) who had seriously injured both Kyo Kusanagi and Shingo Yabuki, managing to steal the Yasakani Jewel from him. Despite being confronted by his estranged childhood friend Elisabeth Blanctorche and her two associates Duo Lon and Benimaru Nikaido, Ash manages to swiftly escape from them, warning the trio that he intends to target Kyo as his final victim.

== Characters ==
The main cast consists of 47 playable fighters. The game introduces three new original characters to the series: Elisabeth Blanctorche, a French noblewoman who has a personal connection with Ash Crimson; Oswald, a veteran poker player and professional assassin from Ireland who utilizes the Karnöffel assassination art; and Momoko, a young capoeira fighter with psychic powers who joins the Psycho Soldier Team. Duck King from Fatal Fury and B. Jenet from Garou: Mark of the Wolves also made their debut in the KOF franchise, while Eiji Kisaragi marked his return to the game after being absent since The King of Fighters '95. Optional mid-bosses include guest characters from Buriki One, Savage Reign and Kizuna Encounter. Meanwhile, seven additional characters exclusive to the PlayStation 2 port are KOF participants based on their Neo Geo Battle Coliseum incarnation, including the NESTS saga version of Kyo Kusanagi, and the debut of Hotaru Futaba from Garou: Mark of the Wolves and Tung Fu Rue from Fatal Fury. Hotaru also appeared in the Garou Team's ending scene and made recurring cameo appearances in later KOF installments, while Tung Fu would later canonically participate in The King of Fighters XIV.

Hero Team

- Ash Crimson
- Oswald
- Shen Woo

Fatal Fury Team

- Terry Bogard
- Kim Kaphwan
- Duck King

Agents Team

- Vanessa
- Blue Mary
- Ramón

Art of Fighting Team

- Ryo Sakazaki
- Yuri Sakazaki
- King

Rivals Team

- Elisabeth Blanctorche
- Duo Lon
- Benimaru Nikaido

K' Team

- K'
- Kula Diamond
- Maxima

Garou MOTW Team

- B. Jenet
- Gato
- Tizoc

Ikari Warriors Team

- Ralf Jones
- Clark Still
- Whip

Anti-Kyokugenryu Team

- Malin
- Kasumi Todoh
- Eiji Kisaragi

Psycho Soldier Team

- Athena Asamiya
- Sie Kensou
- Momoko

Kyo & Iori Team

- Kyo Kusanagi
- Iori Yagami
- Shingo Yabuki

Mid-bosses

- Adelheid Bernstein
- Gai Tendo
- Sho Hayate
- Silber
- Jyazu

Sub-boss

- Shion

Final boss

- Magaki

PS2 exclusive

- Hotaru Futaba
- Mai Shiranui
- Robert Garcia (NGBC outfit)
- Tung Fu Rue
- EX Kyo Kusanagi (NESTS saga outfit)
- Mr. Big
- Geese Howard

== Music ==
The King of Fighters XI Sound Collection (ザ・キング・オブ・ファイターズXI サウンドコレクション) was released on March 24, 2006 by Scitron and SNK. The game's soundtrack consists of two CDs, each containing different versions of the same 37 tracks. While some tracks are identical to the ones from the game, others have been rearranged. Disc one has the tracks from the arcade version, while disc two has the tracks from the PS2 version. The music was composed by Hideki Asanaka and arranged by Koji Takata, Masuo Okumura and Masanori Kuki.

Disc 1: Arcade Track
No.	Title	Length
1.	"The King of Fighters XI"	0:33
2.	"How to Play"	1:04
3.	"PlayerSelect"	0:24
4.	"OrderSelect"	0:20
5.	"joker"	1:54
6.	"Winner"	0:15
7.	"Queen"	1:47
8.	"Street dancer"	1:48
9.	"Jack"	1:27
10.	"After a long absence"	1:44
11.	"白い世界 (White World)"	1:02
12.	"kiss or poison"	1:36
13.	"Smell of gunpowder"	1:55
14.	"PURE~at good old days~"	2:15
15.	"King"	1:36
16.	"Secret Circumstances"	2:08
17.	"Continue"	0:29
18.	"Service"	0:29
19.	"凛々 (Triumphantly)"	1:38
20.	"KDD-0075"	1:37
21.	"New Order"	1:47
22.	"「チャーチャーチャー」 (Chā-chā-chā)"	1:26
23.	"唸る世界 (Groaning World)"	0:38
24.	"抗唄 (Anti-Song)"	2:56
25.	"歪む世界 (Distorted World)"	0:50
26.	"an improvised concerto"	2:13
27.	"覚醒 (Awakening)"	1:05
28.	"Ending – Rain"	1:05
29.	"Ending – PAOPAO"	1:16
30.	"Ending – Rest"	1:12
31.	"Ending – Conference"	1:41
32.	"Ending – Worm"	1:00
33.	"Ending – Sky"	1:51
34.	"Ending – Agent"	0:54
35.	"Ending – Collection"	0:51
36.	"Ending – Parting"	1:02
37.	"SeeYou"	2:28
Total length:		50:16

Disc 2: Arrange Track
No.	Title	Length
1.	"The King of Fighters XI"	0:33
2.	"How to Play"	1:15
3.	"PlayerSelect"	0:34
4.	"OrderSelect"	0:32
5.	"joker"	2:04
6.	"Winner"	0:16
7.	"Queen"	1:48
8.	"Street dancer"	1:54
9.	"Jack"	1:43
10.	"After a long absence"	1:45
11.	"白い世界 (White World)"	1:22
12.	"kiss or poison"	2:16
13.	"Smell of gunpowder"	2:02
14.	"PURE~at good old days~"	2:21
15.	"King"	1:45
16.	"Secret Circumstances"	2:21
17.	"Continue"	0:30
18.	"Service"	0:44
19.	"凛々 (Triumphantly)"	2:11
20.	"KDD-0075"	1:43
21.	"New Order"	1:51
22.	"「チャーチャーチャー」 (Chā-chā-chā)"	2:38
23.	"唸る世界 (Groaning World)"	0:36
24.	"抗唄 (Anti-Song)"	3:05
25.	"歪む世界 (Distorted World)"	0:56
26.	"an improvised concerto"	2:26
27.	"覚醒 (Awakening)"	1:07
28.	"Ending – Rain"	1:14
29.	"Ending – PAOPAO"	1:45
30.	"Ending – Rest"	1:31
31.	"Ending – Conference"	1:55
32.	"Ending – Worm"	1:17
33.	"Ending – Sky"	2:45
34.	"Ending – Agent"	0:59
35.	"Ending – Collection"	1:06
36.	"Ending – Parting"	1:11
37.	"SeeYou"	2:29
Total length:		58:28

== Development and release ==
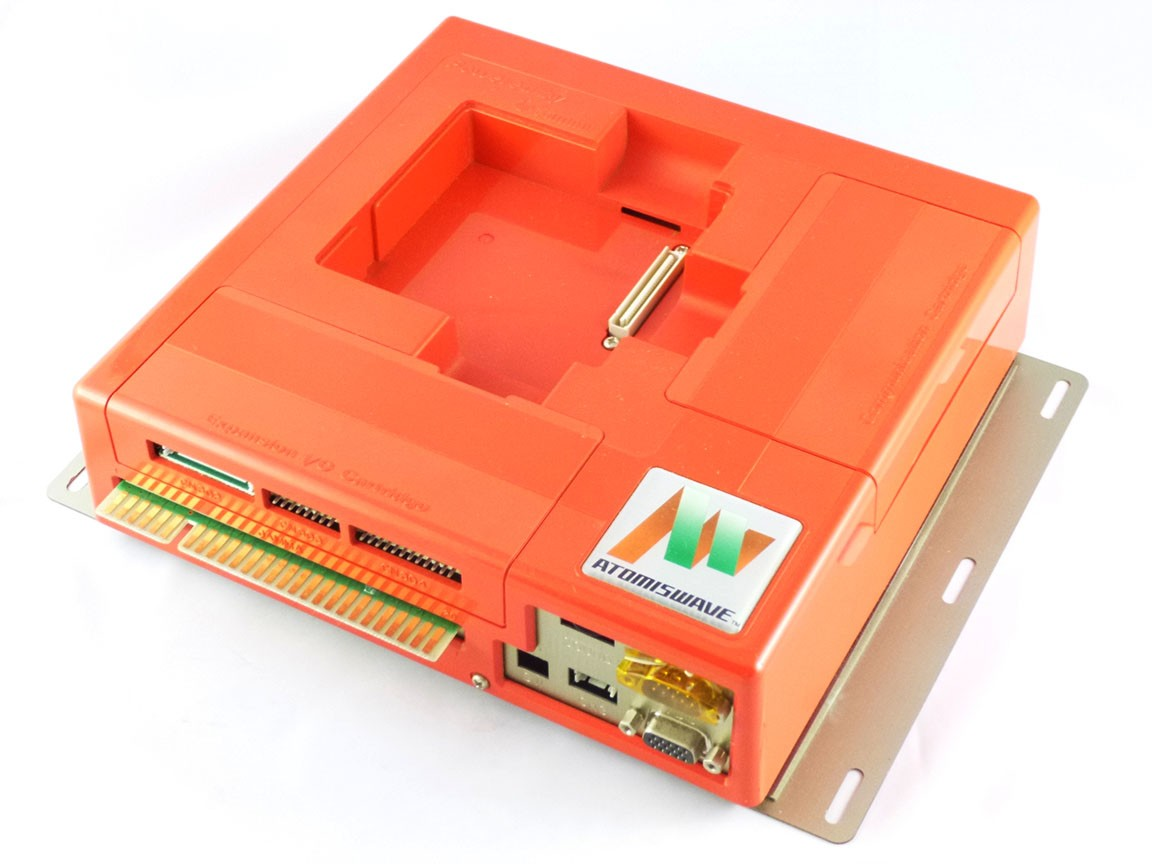
An Atomiswave arcade board without a game cartridge.

In December 2004, Falcoon, the series' main illustrator, said the next game SNK Playmore were developing would be different from the recent spin-off The King of Fighters: Maximum Impact, which was originally intended to be released as The King of Fighters 2004. Development of the game began when SNK completed production on the crossover game Neo Geo Battle Coliseum in 2005. SNK cancelled production of The King of Fighters 2004 in the fall of 2004, after it was announced the company had signed an agreement with Sammy Corporation to use their arcade system instead of the Neo Geo cabinets that had been used for the franchise previously. The arcade version of The King of Fighters XI used Sammy Corporation's Atomiswave system. SNK commented that by using this new system, KOF XI would stand out from its predecessors due to improvements in both gameplay mechanics and graphic quality, specifically the animation frames created for Iori Yagami. However, it lacked the AW-net, a program that allows for online play. SNK had previously tested this system for both Neo Geo Battle Coliseum and The King of Fighters Neowave.

Hiroaki Hashimoto was the main designer for all of the game's characters, while Nona illustrated the endings. When the arcade version was released in the US, cabinets in Tilt Studio locations used converted Final Furlong cabinets, instead of the standard Atomiswave cabinets. As a result of this, there were two screens, one for each player. The addition of mid-bosses from Buriki One and Kizuna Encounter were meant to surprise gamers; since their original moves did not "fit" in The King of Fighters XI, developers had to change some of them. In 1999, SNK released a Fatal Fury installment named Garou: Mark of the Wolves whose narrative lacked closure. As a result, the company decided to utilize those characters in The King of Fighters XI with a bigger role. The movements of the boss character Magaki – the leader of antagonistic group Those from the Past – were intentionally designed to "disgust and disturb fans". The staff had mixed opinions about newcomer Momoko due to her relatively young age. She was designed to fit the Psycho Soldier Team. Meanwhile, Elisabeth Blanctorche was created as a "leading lady" character to give Ash Crimson a rival. Developers sought to make the levels as realistic as possible, with particular focus paid to the Esaka stage. The company planned to add more stages, but these were removed due to time constraints.

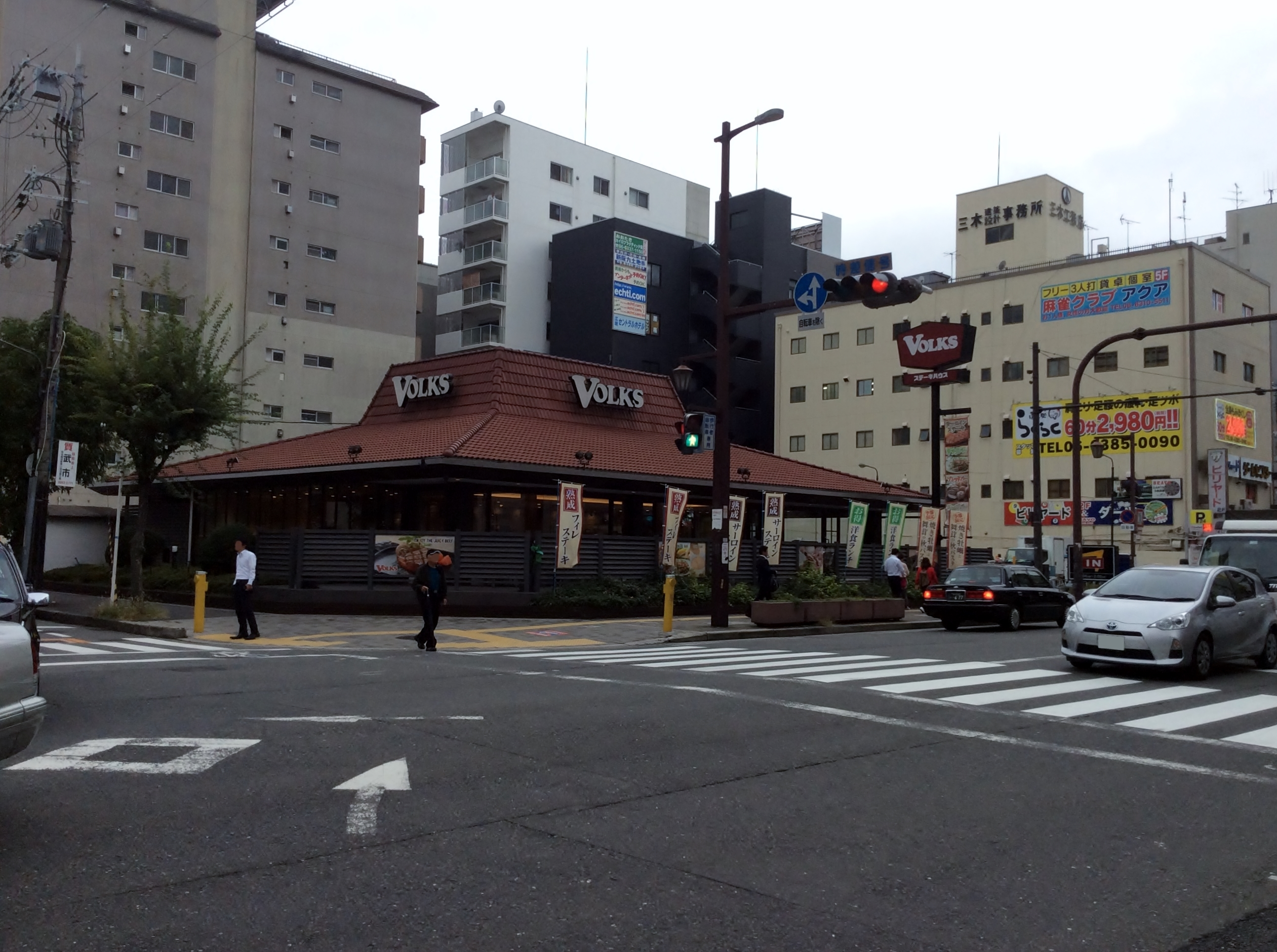
Stages like Esaka were designed to be faithful to real word especially since that is the location where SNK's developers worked.

The game's Japanese port for the PlayStation 2 was released on June 22, 2006. Multiple changes were made for the port to make the controls more responsive, based on feedback from the arcade. On September 8, 2006, Ignition Entertainment announced they had licensed The King of Fighters XI for a European release. SNK Playmore USA announced the game on November 13, 2007. With respect to the progressive scan, SNK explained that the North American version of the game was based on the PAL region. As a result, the American and PAL versions do not support progressive scan, but the Japanese version does. The port was mostly done by Ignition and then reused in other regions, although SNK remained silent about this. Similar to previous entries, the port offers a rearranged version of the audio. SNK Playmore re-released the game in Japan on June 28, 2007, under the label of "SNK Best Collection". The company once again released the game for the PlayStation Network on December 17, 2014, in Japan. In 2020, a homebrew conversion was released for the Dreamcast.

== Reception ==
Reception

Aggregate score
Aggregator	Score
Metacritic	75

Review scores
Publication	Score
Eurogamer	8/10
Famitsu	28/40
GameSpot	8.0/10
GamesRadar+	3.5/5
IGN	8.0/10
Game Revolution	3.5/5
GameZone	8.1/10
MeriStation	8/10
uVeJuegos.com	73/100

=== Sales ===
Since the PlayStation 2 was being replaced by a new console during the release of The King of Fighters XI, Gamasutra listed the game as one for the "hardcore gamer". However, in its release week in Japan, The King of Fighters XI was the only PlayStation 2 title to be featured on Japanese sales charts alongside Konami's World Soccer Winning Eleven 10. The number of copies the game sold in Japan throughout 2005 is unknown, although it sold 47,225 units in 2006.

=== Critical response ===
Critical reception to The King of Fighters XI has been "generally favorable" based on an average score of 75 out of 100 on the Metacritic website. The quality of gameplay and cast of characters was the subject of positive response. GameZone said it offered the "most bang for your buck" on the PS2, considering its late release schedule, calling it a "complex" 2D fighter game. GamesRadar+ enjoyed the considerably higher number of characters and the noticeably fast combat than in previous entries in the series. Ryan Clements of IGN called it "a very old-school 2D fighter" while indicating that the style of the series had not changed much since The King of Fighters '94. He said the game was well organized, despite the large number of playable characters, and enjoyed experimenting with each character's variable fighting techniques. He added that fights would be very difficult for players, until they learned how to use the special moves. Andrew Park of GameSpot opined that the game was well-balanced with its variety of playable characters and complimented its illustrative design. Eurogamer called it an "excellent 2D game", comparable to other works such as one of Capcom's most famous games, Street Fighter III, although they complained about the lack of popular characters from the franchise such as Joe Higashi.

Numerous publications said the graphics were dated due to SNK Playmore's constant use of sprites, although Siliconera enjoyed the art employed in other areas of the game which they said showed a significant increase in graphic quality. Eurogamer said The King of Fighters XI would not stand out amongst other fighting game franchises like Soul Calibur or Tekken, which employ 3D graphics in contrast with this game's 2D graphics. Meristation agreed, saying the franchise was in need of a major overhaul. IGN said the developers should have optimized the graphics, though they felt the menus and cutscenes were well done. uVeJuegos.com was more critical, saying that SNK Playmore should have updated the graphics of the series several years earlier. On the other hand, Game Revolution did not mind the use of 2D graphics based on how the scenarios change across the fights. Despite finding the game's graphics dated, GameZone enjoyed the overall presentation, which the reviewer called "one of best fighting games ever to grace the PS2", noting its low price provided great replay value.

The boss characters attracted some negative responses. GameSpot described the sub-boss Shion as "terribly powerful" and the final boss Magaki as "absurdly overpowered", and criticized the voice acting for the Magaki character, additionally noting that his appearance was unimpressive. GamesRadar+ agreed, describing Magaki as a "Typical KoF final boss from hell". While noting the artificial intelligence had improved from that used in The King of Fighters 2003, uVeJuegos.com said Magaki had unfair moves due to his massive damage input during battles. Game Revolution's reviewer felt that Magaki was one of the strongest bosses they had ever seen based on the way he moves across the screen. He said that proper use of the game's mechanics would allow the player to defeat him and said that the game was still enjoyable despite this boss.

=== Legacy ===
In a retrospective review, HardcoreGaming101 regarded The King of Fighters XI as one of the best entries in the franchise, noting the backgrounds' quality, the gameplay and quick load times compared to the original arcade game. In 2012, Complex ranked it as the eighth best SNK fighting game ever made, adding that "Shion has to be the coolest sub-boss ever". In 2009, SNK Playmore released a sequel called The King of Fighters XII. However, as the game did not feature a story, SNK Playmore finished the story arc involving Ash in The King of Fighters XIII released in 2011. Writer Akihiko Ureshino lamented Mai Shiranui did not make it to the game canonically but was satisfied with her inclusion in KOF: Maximum Impact 2 as a meaning of compensation. ONE37pm listed it as the 16th best SNK game, for improving on KOF 2003's new content and further expanding the amount of playable characters, especially thanks to the PS2 port.
