= Beart =

The surname Beart may refer to:

- Emmanuelle Béart (born 1963), French actress
- Guy Béart (1930–2015), French singer and songwriter and father of Emmanuelle Béart
- Mignon Beart and Ninon Beart, both characters in The King of Fighters
