= The King of Fighters 2000 =

2000 video game

- Japanese arcade flyer showing the playable characters
- Developers: SNK; Playmore (DC/PS2); Dotemu (PC)
- Publishers: SNK: Playmore (DC) PlayStation 2; JP: Playmore; KOR: Mega Enterprise SNK Playmore (PSN/PC) Hamster Corporation (NS/PS4/Xbox One)
- Designers: Chikara Yamasaki; Tomoyuki Hosokawa
- Programmers: Kohji Mannami; Souta Ichino
- Artist: Toshiaki Mori
- Composers: Hideki Asanaka; Hiroshi Yamazoe; Yasuo Yamate
- Series: The King of Fighters
- Platform: Arcade: Dreamcast, PlayStation 2, Neo Geo AES
- Release: July 26, 2000: Arcade; WW: July 26, 2000 Neo Geo AES; JP: December 21, 2000 Dreamcast; JP: August 8, 2002 PlayStation 2; JP: November 28, 2002; KOR: July 11, 2003
- Genre: Fighting
- Modes: Single-player, multiplayer
- Arcade system: Neo Geo MVS

The King of Fighters 2000 (Note: Japanese: ザ・キング・オブ・ファイターズ 2000, Hepburn: Za Kingu Obu Faitāzu 2000) (KOF 2000, or KOF '00) is a 2000 fighting video game developed and published by SNK for the Neo Geo arcade and home platforms. It is the seventh installment in The King of Fighters series for the Neo Geo, and the final game in the series SNK produced before the original company's bankruptcy. The game was ported to the Dreamcast in Japan and the PlayStation 2 in 2002. The game, a sequel to The King of Fighters '99, focuses on a tournament held by the commander of the Hikari military forces, Heidern, who seeks to interrogate the missing K' and Maxima in order to learn about their former group, the NESTS cartel. The gameplay retains the Striker system of the previous games in the series involving assisting characters, but was modified to generate more combos.

SNK entered into bankruptcy while The King of Fighters 2000 was in development. As staff members left the company—including producer Takashi Nishiyama—the game was left with bugs and glitches. The biggest desire of the game was improving the Striker System assisting mode that KOF '99 created. SNK attempted to add further depth to the NESTS cast with K''s new enemy Kula Diamond; other new characters were intended to attract different audiences. The PlayStation 2 version of the game was released in North America and in Europe in a two-in-one bundle with its immediate sequel, The King of Fighters 2001, as the first two games to be published by SNK Playmore USA. In Europe, the bundle was published by Ignition Entertainment.

Critical reception to the game's fighting system and characters has been mostly positive due to improvements SNK brought to the franchise. There were mixed reactions to the company's handling of the graphics and backgrounds; this divided consensus about its status as one of the best games of the series as critics believed previous installments were more appealing. Two novelizations and an audio drama have also been published in Japan.

== Gameplay ==
K' calling Vanessa to attack Kasumi Todoh. The bottom bars indicate how many Strikers the player can use.

The King of Fighters 2000 is a 2D fighting game focused on combos and special moves created to take down the enemy's health and defeat a team of three members. While following the series' tradition of forming teams of three fighters per team, the game also focuses more on assistants. The King of Fighters 2000's gameplay is based on that of The King of Fighters '99; it expands on the "Striker Match" format introduced in its predecessor involving a fourth character who can assist the playable character to fight. The player can also replenish Strike Bombs by either losing rounds or taunting the opponent.

A new addition to the game is that the player now has two choices after selecting the Striker member of the team; he or she can choose to use the regular character or an alternate character officially known as Another Striker. The Another Striker is a character used exclusively for more strategic combos. There is another set of alternative Striker characters known as Maniac Strikers, which are selected in the arcade version by entering codes for notable characters only. The console versions include additional Maniac Strikers by completing a certain number of matches in the "Party Mode". Besides the regular final boss of the arcade mode, Zero, players can face an extra mid-boss named Kula Diamond based on their performances in previous battles.

== Plot and characters ==
After an incident at the previous tournament in The King of Fighters '99, the commander of the Ikari Warriors Team, Heidern, is determined to investigate the objective of the NESTS cartel and stop it from achieving its ruthless ambition. Ling, a fellow commander and long-time friend of Heidern, tells him that K′ and Maxima were once NESTS operatives and that they may hold the key to locating the whereabouts of the mysterious organization. Using this information, Heidern decides to focus his efforts into using the next KOF tournament to lure both K′ and Maxima out of hiding so that they can be captured and interrogated by him for crucial and critical information about the NESTS cartel.

Depending on the player's performance during the tournament, NESTS agent Kula Diamond might appear as an enemy. Shortly afterwards, Ling and some of his associates suddenly attack and betray Heidern near the end of the tournament. The former reveals himself to be a clone of the real Ling who was murdered in the past and being replaced via the machinations of a high-ranking NESTS member named Zero, who seeks to destroy NESTS itself and create a new world order under his own rule. Through the accumulated fighting power he had gathered during the tournament, Zero initiates and utilizes a space-based satellite weapon named the "Zero Cannon", with which he sends a powerful energy blast from it straight towards Earth, destroying most of South Town via the energy blast's explosive impact upon it. After defeating Zero, the Cannon is destroyed by either Heidern or Kula's group depending on the route taken.

The characters included are:

Hero Team

- K'
- Maxima
- Vanessa
- Ramón

Benimaru Team

- Benimaru Nikaido
- Shingo Yabuki
- Seth
- Lin

Fatal Fury Team

- Terry Bogard
- Andy Bogard
- Joe Higashi
- Blue Mary

Art of Fighting Team

- Ryo Sakazaki
- Robert Garcia
- King
- Takuma Sakazaki

Women Fighters Team

- Mai Shiranui
- Yuri Sakazaki
- Kasumi Todoh
- Hinako Shijou

Ikari Warriors Team

- Leona Heidern
- Ralf Jones
- Clark Still
- Whip

Psycho Soldier Team

- Athena Asamiya
- Sie Kensou
- Chin Gentsai
- Bao

Korea Justice Team

- Kim Kaphwan
- Chang Koehan
- Choi Bounge
- Jhun Hoon

Single Entry

- Kyo Kusanagi
- Iori Yagami

Mid-Boss

- Kula Diamond

Final Boss

- Zero

== Development ==
SNK began planning The King of Fighters 2000 in June 1999. Former producer Takashi Nishiyama was absent from the team for the first time in the series due to personal issues with the company and instead created the company Dimps. The arcade version was nearing completion in mid-2000 as the staff became excited at the game's quality. Despite early negative reception regarding the game's state, SNK was pleased with the completed title, citing the arcade as an appealing game. Following its release, SNK thanked the fans for their support. During development, SNK went bankrupt, leading to the game's designers leaving multiple glitches, extra animations, and balancing issues. Since some people left the company, it ended having a small development team.

The game would originally be called The King of Fighters Millennium, but since The King of Fighters '99 used it as a subtitle, they decided to use the final title. The plot was written to explore more the protagonist K' and the NESTS organization antagonizing him. The biggest concept of KOF 2000 is to expand the Striker System involving supporting characters who assist the fighting ones. Rather than changing the way they play, SNK thought it would be better to think of the system they played in the previous game as being broader and deeper in scope. The Counter and Armor Mode returned with balances to be more useful. The graphics were highly altered from the previous game. Similar to previous games, the team struggled with the huge amount of playable characters.

Because previous regulars from The King of Fighters games were not playable, SNK took advantage of the striker system and give players the choice of using Goro Daimon among others as alternative assisting characters. SNK found Terry Bogard and Andy Bogard unbalanced in the previous game which led to revisions. One of the game's developers said the team originally wanted to use more of the characters from The King of Fighters '99, but could not due to licensing issues. New characters were created to appeal to different audiences. The Mexican wrestler Ramon was made to appeal to South Americans because the Neo Geo's popularity in South America. Ramon's designer loved pro-wrestling fighting moves, but the character's techniques were made unrealistic. Vanessa and Seth were originally set to appear in The King of Fighters '99, but debuted on its Dreamcast port as Strikers. Vanessa was created to appeal to women; she is slightly older than the other characters, which players found appealing. Both the debuting Lin and the unplayable Ron generated a major surprise to the SNK staff because their addition to the story was not overlooked. Kula Diamond was created to give a major expansion to the NESTS cartel, while Zero was made to contrast with the NESTS agent Krizalid, the boss from The King of Fighters '99, who had a darker personality. SNK, however, was disappointed with Zero's traits and created a new stronger Zero for The King of Fighters 2001.

== Release ==
The game's arcade version was released on July 26, 2000, for the Neo Geo MVS arcade system. The game was then ported to the Neo Geo and released on December 21 of that year. The Sega Dreamcast port was released on August 8, 2002, while the PlayStation 2 version was made available on November 28 that year. The ports included new Striker characters and new backgrounds. For the North American version, the game was not available to the public until 2003 and released the PlayStation 2 game alongside The King of Fighters 2001 was one of the first games published by SNK Playmore USA. There has been censorship, including the removal of Whip's gun and the movement of Mai Shiranui's cleavage. The Neo-Geo and Sega Dreamcast versions of the game were included in The King of Fighters NESTS Hen, a compilation released for the Sony PlayStation 2 in Japan. The PlayStation 2 version was re-released on May 3, 2016, for the PlayStation 4 through the PlayStation Network. Hamster Corporation re-released the game as part of their ACA Neo Geo series for the PlayStation 4, Xbox One, Nintendo Switch, Windows, Android and iOS.

An audio drama CD was released by Scitron Digital Contents on September 20, 2000. It features two storylines: one exploring the first encounter between K' and Kula Diamond; the second story focuses on Athena Asamiya as she meets rivals in an airport. Series' writer Akihiko Ureshino wrote two light novels published by Kadokawa Shoten. The first novel, Strikers Strike Back, acts as a self-parody of the game's storyline and was released on February 19, 2001. The second novel, Icicle Doll, was released on December 20 the same year and features a more serious storyline.

== Reception ==
Reception

Review scores
Publication	Score
GameSpot	7.8/10
IGN	7.4/10
Nintendo Life	7/10
Man!ac	85%
Obsolete Tears	5/6

=== Popularity ===
In Japan, Game Machine listed The King of Fighters 2000 on their September 1, 2000, issue as being the second-most-successful arcade game of the month. The PlayStation 2 port of The King of Fighters 2000 sold 37,316 units in Japan during 2002. In 2017, it became one of the most downloaded games of the PlayStation Classic collection.

=== Critical response ===
Critical reception for the game's fighting system has been mostly positive. GameSpot said SNK improved most of the problems of its predeccesor The King of Fighters '99 by adding more gameplay features, such as new attacks and new additions to the Striker system. The reviewer said fans might either like or dislike the new characters based on the differences between them and the characters from The King of Fighters '99; they also said the boss Zero is less overpowered than Krizalid, but lacks his appeal. IGN said in terms of the Striker system and liked the additional characters it is an improvement, making it one of the best games of the franchise. In another review, IGN stated that the game offered many good new characters, particularly Lin. Nintendo Life said that while the addition of the Striker system because of the newly possible combo, the game did not live up to the previous games. Man!ac enjoyed the short loading times and how casual the gameplay can as well as the large amount of playable characters.

The game's presentation drew mixed reactions. IGN said these elements appeared dated due to similarities with those of previous installments and the improved graphics of new consoles. GameSpot said while SNK attempted to improve the designs of the characters, the quality was still not as appealing as it should have been and that the background stages felt hollow. HardcoreGaming found the PlayStation 2 port of the game superior to the Dreamcast version because the former fixed some slowdown issues and said Kyo Kusanagi's theme "Goodbye Esaka" was one of the best themes created by SNK. MeriStation enjoyed the game's story as it builds up on The King of Fighters '99's story by exploring more the NESTS cartel as well as the experiments they created by using the Kyo Kusanagi's DNA, resulting into a notable cast with similar special moves including the Strikers.
