= Kula Diamond =

The King of Fighters character

- The King of Fighters character
- Kula in The King of Fighters XI by Hiroaki Hashimoto
- First game: The King of Fighters 2000
- Voiced by: Yumi Kakazu

In-universe information
- Fighting style: Anti-K' Arts

Kula Diamond (Japanese: クーラ・ダイアモンド, Hepburn: Kūra Daiamondo) is a fictional character in SNK's fighting-game franchise, The King of Fighters. She first appears as a sub-boss and playable character in The King of Fighters 2000, and is a normal participant in her other appearances. The character is present in a number of the franchise's spin-off games (most notably SNK Heroines: Tag Team Frenzy) and Akihiko Ureshino's novelizations of the games and comic books from China. Originally a member of the organization NESTS, Kula is the result of an experiment to kill the rebellious K' and has the title of "Anti-K'" (アンチK', Anchi-Kei Dasshu). During NESTS' destruction, however, she forms a bond with K' and his allies and joins his team. In subsequent titles, she lives with K' under the care of cyborg Maxima.

Kula was created as an addition to the NESTS syndicate and to add more depth to the series' second story arc. Her physical appearance was designed to appeal to female players. Yumi Kakazu has voiced Kula in all her appearances.

Critical response to the character was positive, based on her role in the NESTS arc, due to her heroism despite being an agent of the antagonists and forming bonds with her supposed enemies. Kula was also popular because of her fighting style (primarily her use of ice), her contrast with K', her outfits in SNK Heroines: Tag Team Frenzy, and a commercial for a cancelled SNK game.

== Creation and design ==
SNK created Kula Diamond to bring more complexity to the NESTS story arc in the series. Her character added another dimension to the villainous organization in the NESTS Chronicles. She was intended to add excitement to the story as an enemy and a foil of K'. Newly-hired female staff designed her to depict a "14-year-old girl" with "appropriately girlish" gestures. The unnamed character designer was pleased with Kula's design: "Kula had an easy delivery. She didn't give me any pain." Despite being K''s foil, Kula was designed to closely resemble her rival; both fighters wear similar leather outfits with contrasting colors. According to artist Hiroaki Hashimoto, Kula does not look like a 14-year-old girl in the illustrations; he said that drawing her was difficult, since he was unskilled with women and children. Nevertheless, he claims he grew attached to drawing her alongside K'.

After the NESTS arc, Kula becomes part of the K' team. Writer Akihiko Ureshino considered the group as a family, with Kula the younger sister of K', Whip and Maxima despite their previous enmity. However, Ureshino believed that Angel and K9999 remained antagonistic towards them. Yumi Kakazu has voiced Kula in all her appearances. In KOF: Maximum Impact 2, Falcoon gave her a color palette that makes her look like fighter Ash Crimson and the robot Candy. Her alternative costume is that of a coquettish ice skater. Falcoon also envisioned an adult version of Kula for the game Kimi wa Hero.

For The King of Fighters XIII, the staff decided to make Kula similar to her original incarnation in The King of Fighters 2000. The team had no problems designing her gameplay, and added taunts where the character becomes boring. Similar to K's moves, the developers wanted Kula's trademarks (most notably her ice moves) to be visually appealing; a move exemplifying this was the "Crow Bites". Kula's "Diamond Breath" move was recommended for new players, and the "Reispin" was designed to make the gameplay more complex and challenging as Kula becomes stronger when executing it. Kula's strongest technique in the game involves the appearance of Foxy and Diana, who attack the enemy with her. This technique had a number of trials before it was added to the game.

When developing The King of Fighters XIV with the Unreal Engine, the original game had more realistic visuals which clashed with the character designs of Kula and Athena Asamiya. The designs resembled those in an anime series, so the designers opted for the present look. A programmer with an alias of "Ando" designed the blades on Kula's boots during special attacks. Kula was the first character in KOF XIV with this type of design, requiring multiple attempts to work with her 3D character model. Ando believed that Kula could wield other types of weapons, based on the variety used by the cast, but ultimately felt that using blades could be more challenging. An extra outfit for Kula was released for The King of Fighters XIV as downloadable content.

In SNK Heroines: Tag Team Frenzy, Kula wears Ángel's skimpy clothing. Director Kaito Soranaka said in an interview that Kula was his favorite character in the game. Artist Eisuke Ogura said that having Kula wear Ángel's outfit indicates that Kula hates Ángel, so game villain Kukri gave her that appearance to humiliate her. In The King of Fighters XV Kula was given a move to create snowmen, something she had in her introduction but was later removed.

== Appearances ==
Kula Diamond is a teenage girl who was experimented on by NESTS to exterminate the cartel's traitor, K'. Kula was a mindless puppet with no apparent emotions, but NESTS created android Candy Diamond to monitor her behavior and ensure that she would carry out her missions. During KOF 2000, her debut, Kula can be fought as a mid-boss. She then removes the main Zero Cannon from its titular creator, who is betraying NESTS. Candy shields Kula's descent from space by sacrificing her body, which is badly burned by Earth's atmosphere. While recovering from the trauma of Candy's destruction, in the following game (The King of Fighters 2001) Kula enters the fighting tournament with fellow NESTS agents Foxy, K9999 and Ángel to capture K'. During the story, Kula and Foxy are betrayed by K9999 and Ángel. In K's team ending and elsewhere, however, she is seen as safe and forms a friendship with her original target and allies. In the plotless game KOF 2002, Kula is a member of a team with Ángel and K9999.

In KOF 2003, she appears in the ending of the K' Team when the group recruit her after an apparent threat. Kula participates in KOF XI and KOF XIII with K' and Maxima as allies after joining forces with the Ikari Team. They are assigned to investigate a group known as "Those From the Past". In KOF XIV, she again participates in the tournament in accordance with Ikari's orders to investigate NESTS agents. During these games, the K' Team becomes allied with the Ikari Team to help them on missions though they tend to avoid them. Before The King of Fighters XV, Kula and K' have a falling-out because he and Maxima are too busy capturing remaining NESTS remnants instead of vacationing with her; she joins a team consisting of former NESTS agents, Angel and a mysterious agent who is K9999's current identity (Krohnen McDougall, unbeknownst to Kula).

Kula also appears in the spin-off games Neowave (plotless) and KOF: Maximum Impact 2, where she looks for a doctor to repair Maxima's cybernetic body. She appears in The King of Fighters '98: Unlimited Match Online, The King of Fighters Online, KOF: Sky Stage, Neo Geo Heroes: Ultimate Shooting and SNK Heroines: Tag Team Frenzy. In SNK Heroines, the female fighters must fight their way home but are confronted by Kukri and defeat him before he can impose his plan on the kidnapped female fighters. Kula makes a cameo appearance with Maxima in the ending of K' in Neo Geo Battle Coliseum. She is playable in the mobile-phone game Kimi wa Hero (as an adult) and Brave Frontier, and has a cameo in the dating sim Days of Memories if the player interacts with K'. Kula has made guest appearances in games which include the role-playing Valkyrie Connect, and is a downloadable character in Koei Tecmo's fighting game Dead or Alive 6. In her story chapter, NiCO pulls her into the "Dead or Alive" dimension while experimenting with subspace portals. Kula and NiCO briefly spar, and NiCO later thanks her for providing "interesting data" and swears her to secrecy.

The printed adaptations of The King of Fighters retell Kula's role in the NESTS story arc, where she constantly clashes with K' until the events of 2001 and 2002. Kula also appears in the CD dramas from KOF 2000, in which she attacks K' before the events of her story. K' is knocked out by Maxima for fighting with his wounded arm, and the fugitive escapes from Kula with the unconscious K'. A cyborg, Rugal Bernstein, kidnaps Kula during the 2002 storyline to absorb her powers. Rugal defeats the fighters Kyo Kusanagi and Iori Yagami but is stopped by K' and Maxima, who rescue their former enemy. In the The King of Fighters XII comic, Kula engages the mysterious Magaki with K' and former NESTS agent Nameless. In The King of Figters: A New Beginning manga, the K' Team participates in a new tournament when Igniz's revival makes Kula go berserk and fight K' and Maxima. When Kyo decapitates Igniz, the K' Team regain their senses and Igniz's remains are incinerated by K'.

== Reception ==
=== Promotion and merchandise ===
A bishojo figurine based on Kula's design was released in April 2026. According to the web portal Excite, it recreates the character's innocent expression and charm for which many fans have been waiting and preserves the illustration in a way unique to a three-dimensional figure. In a video-game museum in Rome, Kula is the mascot of the Neo Geo era.

=== Critical reception ===
The character has been generally well-received for her role in KOF. In an article on the history of SNK, GameSpot described her as the yin to K's yang. Conexión Manga found her introduction heroic; Kula and her caretaker take down the renegade NESTS agent, Zero, by redirecting his Zero Cannon to his base after the destruction of South Town; Kula nearly dies, and is saved by the robot Candy. Bonus Stage Magazine called her the opposite of Kyo Kusanagi in gender and powers. Rather than targeting the heroic K' or Kyo, however, Kula attacks Zero. While K' faces Zero, Kula tries to take down the Zero Cannon at the cost of Candy (whose sacrifice makes the young Kula understand human emotions and appreciate friendship). About The King of Fighters 2001, Conexión Manga said that because NESTS created Kula (among other experiments) they cannot be free of Igniz's control until former heroes Kyo and Iori Yagami help K' finish one of the last NESTS agents. Although Kula makes peace with K' after being betrayed by K9999 and Angel, Conexion Manga was confused by how SNK handled the scenario; in the ending, agent Misty is still alive and seeks power.

An Electronic Gaming Monthly writer said that Kula took the world by surprise in KOF 2000, and has been among the franchise's most beloved characters. The character was praised for opposing K' with ice techniques which can counter the Kusanagi flames that K' wields in battle. Developed as the anti-K', the writer praised the decision for her to turn against her superiors with him. Chris Moyse of Destructoid said that although some SNK fans looked down on the NESTS story arc due to its exploitation of Kyo Kusanagi clones and a number of Star Wars similarities, they still appreciated several of the clones; Kula was an example among other test subjects, such as K'. GameRant called her one of the series' best characters, thanks to her childlike personality (despite initial impressions of a cold stereotype, meant to contrast with K').

About her gameplay, IGN found Kula one of the most appealing characters in The King of Fighters 2000 (her introduction); however, the reviewer felt that newcomer Lin might be superior. GameZone enjoyed her development in The King of Fighters XI, comparing her style to "athletes participating in [an] acclaimed Olympic event" and praising SNK's execution of the character. Den of Geek praised her appealing, upbeat characterization and role as a foil for K', "simply center[ing] him by being his loving opposite". SNK artist Falcoon noted that the character had become popular with fans of the series as after a poll on his Twitter account of what character he should draw.

Kula has also been popular in games using the Mugen game engine (where she is known as "Super Kula"), but was criticized for her power despite a lack of simple techniques. Siliconera found her fighting style in SNK Heroines: Tag Team Frenzy ridiculous due to her use of "cups of what appears to be sorbet". TheGamer and GameRant regarded Kula as one of gaming's best characters with ice abilities due to their potential and her development from The King of Fighters 2000 to The King of Fighters XV.

The character's sexualization has been criticized. Atomix was critical of SNK Heroines for having the female characters, particularly Kula, fight in skimpy dresses. Kula's age (much younger than the other characters') was criticized when she appeared as a guest in Dead or Alive 6, but Destructoid found the character's moves appealing. Her sexualization was cited by Ian Walker of Kotaku in October 2020 for a commercial for the mobile-phone game SNK Allstar, where Terry Bogard harasses her, Mai Shiranui and Blue Mary. Walker compared the scenario to the 2007 film Death Proof, where three woman kill a man in a revenge similar to Kula, Mary and Mai's reaction to Terry. The ad was cancelled by SNK.
