= K' =

Video game character from The King of Fighters fighting game series

- The King of Fighters character
- K' in The King of Fighters XI
- First game: The King of Fighters '99 (1999)
- Created by: Inoue
- Voiced by: Japanese; Yuuki Matsuda (KOF '99 - KOF XIII); Yoshihisa Kawahara (KOF XIV - onwards); Yūki Ono (KOF for Girls)

In-universe information
- Fighting style: Pure violence (暴力)

K Dash (Japanese: ケイ・ダッシュ, Hepburn: Kei Dasshu; commonly stylized as K' and also known as K Prime in certain English language materials) is a character from The King of Fighters fighting game series developed by SNK. He debuted as the leader of the Hero Team in The King of Fighters '99, released in 1999. He often stars as the reluctant hero. K' is a young man who lost all his memories when the NESTS syndicate captured him and injected the DNA of Kyo Kusanagi to replicate his pyrokinetic abilities. While rebelling against organization, K' forms multiple bonds with other NESTS agents. Aside from the main series, K' also appears in several other media series, such as spin-offs and crossover video games, as well as printed adaptations of the series.

He was created to be a "dark hero" in contrast to the series' previous protagonist Kyo. While K''s gameplay has been altered across the franchise in order to be more stylish, his physical appearance has generally remained unchanged. SNK artist Falcoon still tried giving K' different outfits in the Maximum Impact spin-offs in order to attract more gamers as well as giving him more variety.

Since his introduction in the series, K' has received both praise and criticism by video game publications. The character's gameplay and role in the story has been praised to the point of often being listed as one of best ones from the series. His absence in The King of Fighters XII was controversial and his return in the following game was due mainly to his popularity as a character.

== Conception and creation ==
To contrast the previous protagonist of the series, Kyo Kusanagi, K' was made to be the "dark hero". During the early phases of the development of The King of Fighters '99, the introduction of K' to the series was meant to remove popular characters Kyo and Iori Yagami from the roster—though this idea was scrapped before the game's release. Eiji, one of the game's designers, commented that he thought K' would be more popular than he turned out to be, noting that K' was too plain. Nevertheless, character designer Tatsuhiko Kanaoka, better known as "Falcoon", said K' was one of his favorite original King of Fighters characters. He further compared him with Dante, the main character of Devil May Cry based on their anti-heroic traits. When exploring K''s role in KOF: Maximum Impact 2, Ureshino took notes from SNK members who worked in The King of Fighters 2001 as he was not present for such work. He enjoyed the handling of the NESTS' experiments and wanted to explore more K' and Kula's relationship in upcoming works.

Writer Akihiko Ureshino said K' has a hard time coming up with a motivation to participate in the game because of his attribute of "hating KOF". Following on from last time, here are some random thoughts about the people around him. For K', Maxima is not a rival, nemesis, senior, or lover, but a colleague. For K', Maxima was like a living smart speaker who looked after him in every way. Even after overcoming the battle with NESTS at the end of 2001, a friendship probably had not developed between the two, but the fact that they continue to act together despite being able to escape on their own is because both K' and Maxima recognize each other as a kind of comrades in arms K' and the others have a pseudo-family-like character structure. With just the absent-minded but "earnest father" Whip, the "dependable mother" Maxima, and the rebellious son K', the family would be too strained and unbalanced, but with the addition of the innocent "younger sister" Kula, helped give the cast a more lovable status. Despite highly unsociable, K' becomes more open to other due to his interactions with Kula. K9999 was more of a pushover than a rival to K'. They do not share the same friendly rivalry like Iori to Kyo, and it's not a problem if he's not around. The novelization of 2001 was written with this in mind.

=== Design ===
Designer Hiroaki Hashimoto said that while most characters felt difficult to illustrate, K' did not give him problems, making him the easiest character during his game debut, The King of Fighters 2000. Furthermore, Hiroaki said that he has memorised the design of K' to the point he never needed to check an image in order to draw a different stance involving the character. In one of the images he made, Hiroaki's superiors said that his eyes were incorrectly colored but Hiroaki insisted it was made on purpose and as in multiple arts K' stares at Kula Diamond and thus his eye color reflects Kula's. When drawing him, Falcoon states K' can be challenging due to similar parts within his appearance.

While the character has always worn a black clothing, Falcoon has attempted to do a simpler designs that might show more sex appeal while at the same time giving him more variety in terms of clothing. For the spin-off games known as Maximum Impact, Falcoon, produced multiple alternate costumes. The normal costume that has uniform levels of a hard image throughout. Whether it's his "color E" with its overflowing roughness that is evocative of a wild dog or his "color G" that emphasizes himself as a motorcyclist, this is a design that has succeeded in magnifying his image on many levels regardless of the variation according to Falcoon. Him exposing his upper-half with his "another color" and having characteristics such as sunglasses on him, a wild image of him is portrayed. Music composer Sha-V suggested that K' should yell "Dora!" or "Ora!" to mirror Kyo and Iori's shouts, "Kurae!" and "Doushita!" respectively. Konny, another music composer, jokingly wondered if K' is trying to say the word "dry", since the first word of his yell was "Dorei!" Originally, K' was voiced by Yuuki Matsuda. However, by The King of Fighters XIV, he was replaced by Yoshihisa Kawahara. For the otome game, The King of Fighters: For Girls, Yūki Ono is voicing the character who worked hard with Maxima's voice actor to perform a duet. He enjoy this take of the characters and was looking forward to the audience's reaction.

It has been noted by several of the series' designers that K' is one of the most difficult characters to illustrate, since his look is very different when he is drawn by different illustrators. In the early development of the game, K' had a slicked back hairstyle, but as it was nixed by his powers, the character's hair was changed. They also jokingly mentioned that the reason for his hair being bushier than it needed to be may be a reflection of the conditions around him. The King of Fighters '99 was developed at the same time as Garou: Mark of the Wolves; developers noted several similarities between K' and Mark of the Wolves' main character, Rock Howard, which caused K''s designer to become very nervous. For The King of Fighters XIII, the producer Masaaki Kukineo mentions that the team were pursuing a more "cooler" version of K' where he now keeps his sunglasses on during the fight. He wanted fans to pay close attention to his new animations.

The destruction of K''s glove in The King of Fighters inspired the character's stances in later games.

=== Gameplay ===
K''s fighting style is simply called Pure Violence (暴力, Bōryoku), which involves him using the fire from his right hand along with martial arts moves. The producer of The King of Fighters 2002: Unlimited Match, Neogeo Hakase, advised advanced players to use K' stating that once the player had learned how to control him, the character would become very strong during fights. The character also uses Jeet Kune Do moves like the one-inch punch, as references to late martial artist Bruce Lee. His gameplay mechanics were developed so that gamers who had used him before would not find his new gameplay mechanics strange. He was made to be good at long distances and medium distances. In addition, SNK tried making it possible to use the technical composition and usage in the same way as the past title. In contrast to Kyo's flames, K''s were designed with intention of making them look more violent. SNK recommended players using the Crow Bites (クロウバイツ, Kurō Baitsu) EX mode which was based on KOF 2003's Heavens Drive (ヘブンズドライブ, Hebunzu Doraibu) in order to create multiple attacks in a single combo.

As a result of various The King of Fighters endings showing K' removing his red glove, a special move was required to show him doing the same thing. After thinking of several methods that would show this, the staff was inspired by The King of Fighters HK Comics printed adaptations in which the character's glove once broke after defeating his opponent, leading to his winpose that happens only after he has used his strongest technique. The team made various revisions of K''s "Chain Drive" (チェーンドライブ, Chēn Doraibu) technique that required multiple touches to generate a major visual impact. This technique was named the Hyper Chain Drive. In order to better follow the material that inspired the move, the staff decided to make K' fight while wearing his sunglasses. This version generated popular response according to the developers.

== Appearances ==
=== In video games ===
An antisocial teenager, K' makes his debut as a playable character in The King of Fighters '99. K' and his comrade Maxima hear of a King of Fighters tournament being held by NESTS and a "Hero Team" along with Benimaru Nikaido and Shingo Yabuki. The Hero Team is taken to a NESTS base, where they meet NESTS' agent Krizalid, who claims that K' was cloned from him; both are ignorant of the fact that K' was the original. Following Krizalid's defeat, K' and Maxima become targets of NESTS. In The King of Fighters 2000, K' and Maxima enter a new tournament, along with mercenaries Vanessa and Ramón. K' and Maxima enter the tournament to discover NESTS' scheme, but Vanessa and Ramón are using them to find NESTS. K' and his team make it to the finals and face NESTS' agent Zero. After Zero's defeat, K' has a dream involving his sister. He wakes up with Maxima as well as Whip, the clone of his sister.

In The King of Fighters 2001, K', Maxima, and Whip are joined by Lin, a Hizoku assassin who has a grudge against Ron, who betrayed the Hizoku to join NESTS. During the tournament, K' and his team face the original Zero, the one they met during the events of The King of Fighters 2000 having been a clone, and the new NESTS leader, Igniz, who has the secrets to unlock K''s memories. After Igniz commits suicide, K' forms an alliance with Kula Diamond, a clone designed to be the Anti-K', and her guardian Diana to continue their lives. In The King of Fighters 2002, a game without a storyline, K' is a playable character, along with Maxima and Whip.

In The King of Fighters 2003, K' and Maxima are requested to enter that year's tournament by Chin Gentsai to investigate a dark wave around the King of Fighters. In the tournament, K' is mocked by the demon Mukai, from to the group "Those from the Past" over his inferiority complex. In The King of Fighters XI, K' enters the tournament with Maxima and Kula, in order to surpass his limits. The King of Fighters XIII retains the same team from The King of Fighters XI, with K' teaming with Kula and Maxima. Once again forced to team up, K' and his comrades continue investigating the motives behind Mukai's superiors in a ruins. K''s team once again join the tournament in The King of Fighters XIV following requests from Whip's team to search missing NESTS agents. He returns in The King of Fighters XV, having had been persuaded by both Maxima and Whip to find and apologize to Kula for being to careless towards her and resulting her to join a team consisting defected NESTS agents Angel and the mysterious Krohnen McDougall.

Aside from the main series, K' has also appeared in other media from The King of Fighters series. K' appears in the spin-off video game series The King of Fighters: Maximum Impact and Neowave. In Neowave, K' is playable, as are Maxima and Whip; while in Maximum Impact, he fights alone (as do all characters in the game). While only appearing as an assist character in The King of Fighters EX: Neo Blood, K' can be unlocked across the game. In the Maximum Impact series, he enters into the King of Fighters tournaments searching for the host who sponsored it and meet the doctor who might repair Maxima's cybernetic body. He is also present in The King of Fighters All Star where writer Akihiko Ureshino regard this portrayal of K' more aggressive and talkative than the original one. In the crossover video game Neo Geo Battle Coliseum, K' is featured as a playable character. In his ending, a frustrated K' feeks relief after realizing that while his memories still have not come back, he formed bonds with Maxima and Kula. He is also a character card in SNK vs. Capcom: Card Fighter DS, He is also present in the RPG Kimi wa Hero, and Clash of Kings. Though unplayable, K' appears The King of Fighters: Battle de Paradise, as well as in Kula's endings from both Neo Geo Heroes: Ultimate Shooting and SNK Heroines: Tag Team Frenzy. Prior to the cancellation of Capcom Fighting All-Stars, K' was intended to appear as a guest character.

=== In other media ===
In the anime The King of Fighters: Another Day, K' is featured prominently in the third chapter. K' also appears in the manhua adaptation of The King of Fighters: Zillion that was created by Andy Seto. He stars in other manhua for the games, starting with The King of Fighters 2001 through 2003, as well as the Maximum Impact series. In the KOF XII manhua, K' seen fighting against Mukai's ally, Magaki, but with the help of Kula and Nameless, another NESTS former agent. Another adaptation of the NESTS games focuses on K''s life ever since his rebellion against the group until Zero's defeat. He also appears in the CD dramas KOF 2000, in which he confronts Kula, Diamond, and in KOF: Mid Summer Struggle, in which he appears in a fake King of Fighters tournament. The manga A New Beginning features K', Kula and Maxima joining into another tournament. He is also present in multiple novelizations of the series by Akihiko Ureshino. The character has appeared in a dating sim part of the Days of Memories series and the otome game King of Fighters for Girls.

== Reception ==
The character K' has received praise and criticism from several video game publications and other media. Uve Juegos regarded K' as one of the best new characters from The King of Fighters '99 while Scott Daylor from CultureCuartel labelled him a "lame" addition to the character roster. Andres Rojas from Nintendo World Report referred to K' as "a fighter not to be reckoned with" as well as a comical "Michael Jackson wannabe". 1UP.com praised K' as among the most inspired new character designs in The King of Fighters series since Iori Yagami in The King of Fighters '95, noting his unique fighting style: merely "Violence" which contrasted with other known fighting styles. Additionally, 1UP.com noted that anything involving the character's sunglasses qualified as the best pose from the game. Gaming Age writer Jeff Keely took a liking to K' due to how he uses Kyo's techniques but in projectile forms. Den of Geek listed K' as the 24th best The King of Fighters with the writer finding his story as one of the best parts from the NESTS saga despite initially disliking him. Additionally, the writer enjoyed his fighting style calling his "badass animations". On the other hand, Complex against his "douchiest" charactererzation based on his outfit and the way he attacks enemies. 4thLetter enjoyed the contrast between K''s characterization from his teammates, Maxima and Kula, noting that the team's ending from XIII has him enjoying a vacation by beating up unknown enemies. In a history article of SNK, GameSpot described Kula as the yin to K''s yang due to how different are both characters in terms of elements they control while fighting. In a retrospective article, Polygon noted The King of Fighters story arcs involving the character fighting across in different eras with the era of K' starting in The King of Fighters '99 where he replaces the previous protagonist Kyo as one of the most marketable characters often seen in promotional artwork from the game. However, with The King of Fighters 2003, K' would be replaced by another protagonist, Ash Crimson, marking the start of another era. Similarly, Retronauts while The King of Fighters '99 was controversial upon release due the near complete removal of Kyo Kusanagi and Iori Yagami, K' and Maxima came across as suitable newcomers even if K' was too similar to Kyo and had a confusing narrative about cloning.

On the official SNK Playmore King of Fighters anniversary website, an image of K' drawn in the style of the other The King of Fighters XII participants appeared, along with a similar image of Mai Shiranui, leading to speculation that they would appear in the game. UTV Ignition Entertainment's business development director Shane Bettenhausen refused to answer these rumors, but noted fans asked more often about Mai's absence. None of them made it into the game which caused discontent within gamers. In an official press releases by Atlus regarding The King of Fighters XIII, it was stated that K''s return was because of popular demand. His return along with his two teammates, Maxima and Kula, as well as Mai, has been met with praise by video game publications, with GamePro labeling as one of the best ones alongside Mai based on their appearances. Shoryuken noted that despite how overpowered K' became in the patched version of KOF XIV, players would enjoy playing as him, while Vandal referred to him as series' most popular characters. A reviewer from GameSpot stated he played 20 hours of KOF XIV maining mostly K' before doing an article about the game which he enjoyed. PlayStation Universe regarded K' as "one of the coolest, most popular characters in the KOF Series" while also making sure people come to enjoy his moves alongside Kula's. Famitsu noted that while K' was originally a weak fighter, The King of Fighters XV made his fight style more effective to use even if his new Climax requires more focus to properly execute. The same site also praised Hiroaki Hashimoto's illustration for The King of Fighters 2001 for the appeal he gives to the design. Excite said K' became relatively well-balanced and easy-to-use character compared to the previous series. They praised the animation used for his Desperation Moves like the Ein Trigger and Chain Drive in XV.

Critics have also commented on the character's role in the printed adaptations of the franchise. In retrospect, Gamer TW said that when first introduced in the Chinese comics, K' was poorly received due to lacking the appeal of Kyo Kusanagi and Iori Yagami who overshadow him the comic of The King of Fighters '99. With The King of Fighters 2000 comics, K' became a more sympathetic character as the lead's flaws were explored and tried being friendlier with other characters with his mission of recovering his past persona. This was further helped by the creation of an original character for the Chinese character whose dynamic with K' made him charming. Since Kyo and Iori less screentim, K' managede to develop a notable rivalry with Ryo and Terry Bogard. However, the writer felt his story from The King of Fighters 2001 made him boring K'. Atomix noted that the KOF 2000 was one of the first times K' was given the role of protagonist but it was not until the next series, KOF 2001 that his personality was more developed. A. E. Sparrow, reviewing the graphic novel King of Fighters 2003 for IGN, commented that K' is "sufficiently heroic" with the comic allowing the exploration of his motivations. Mania Entertainment's Ben Leary said the K'-heavy storyline makes "one of the wildest transitions I've seen in a comic yet" with K' involved in a conflict related to Japanese mythology for no apparent reason but criticized the lack of notable results.
