= KOF: Maximum Impact 2 =

2006 video game

The King of Fighters 2006
- Developer: SNK Playmore
- Publishers: NA/JP: SNK Playmore; EU: Ignition Entertainment
- Director: Masahiro Maeda
- Producer: Falcoon
- Designers: Takahiro Abe; Yutaka Kurozumi
- Programmer: Kazuaki Ezato
- Artist: Falcoon
- Writer: Akihiko Ureshino
- Composer: Toshikazu Tanaka
- Series: The King of Fighters
- Engine: RenderWare
- Platforms: Arcade, PlayStation 2
- Release: JP: April 27, 2006; NA: September 19, 2006; EU: March 23, 2007
- Genre: Fighting
- Mode: Up to 2 players simultaneously

The King of Fighters 2006, (Note: (KOF 2006, or KOF '06)) known in Japan as KOF: Maximum Impact 2, (Note: (KOF:MI2)) is a 3D fighting video game produced by SNK Playmore and released for the PlayStation 2 in 2006. An updated version was released on both PlayStation 2 and arcades in Japan under the title KOF: Maximum Impact Regulation A in 2007. It is the sequel to KOF: Maximum Impact (2004), which itself is a spinoff of The King of Fighters (KOF) series. Just like Maximum Impact, the story takes place in South Town where a new King of Fightters tournament is hosted by the group Mephistopheles. The games keeps the formula of selecting one characters against others controlled by other players or the artificial intelligence.

While the game does not have a cinematic mode, writer Akihiko Ureshino wrote a webnovel based on it. Falcoon returned to illustrate all the characters. While selling over 50,000 units, the game was the subject of mixed responses by video game journalists. The game was promoted by an original net animation called Another Day while an updated game was released for Japanese arcades and the consoles under the title The King of Fighters: Maximum Impact A.

== Gameplay ==
A fight between Mr. Karate and Terry Bogard.

Maximum Impact 2 has several elements of the original Maximum Impact game from 2004. In contrast to the original KOF games that rely on teams and 3D visuals, Maximum Impact 2 relies only on one character per mode and 3D visuals. By passing trials or beating the story mode, the player is able to unlock new characters, stages as well as variations of outfits. Similar to other 3D fighting games, the player has access to juggling combos and ground attacks. The areas can result into the fighters being cornered against the wall in the middle of fight. Unlike the original Maximum Impact, the sequel offers both Japanese and English language. The Japanese version came with a network mode but the English version was not benefitted by it.

== Plot ==
In South Town, the previous illegal King of Fighters tournament was secretly backed by the criminal syndicate Mephistopheles to eliminate rival factions and make money. Following the defeat of the syndicate's leader, Duke, at the hands of Alba Meira in the finals, Mephistopheles collapses, and Duke flees the city. In the aftermath, media outlets previously influenced by Duke publish exposés revealing the syndicate's former adversaries and criminal connections.

However, Mephistopheles is revealed to have been an operative front for a more powerful clandestine organization known as Addes. Seeking to demonstrate its dominance, Addes sponsors a new King of Fighters tournament and invites fighters from all over the world to participate.

As stated in Alba Meira's private novel by Akihiko Ureshino on the official KOF Maximum Impact 2 site (which serves as an official follow up to the story of KOF Maximum Impact 2), Alba was in fact the one who defeated Jivatma and Luise. Soiree was kidnapped as a result of that and Alba has not seen him since then.

== Characters ==
The game features 24 initially selectable characters, as well as 14 secret characters (including the final boss), for a total of 38 playable characters. Some characters have special alternate versions that can be unlocked. New characters are marked in bold.

- Alba Meira
- **Armor Ralf** (Note: Hidden character) (Note: A version of Ralf who doesn't flinch when hit, and whose attacks do greatly increased guard damage.)
- Athena Asamiya
- **Billy Kane**
- **Bonne Jenet**
- Chae Lim
- Clark Still
- Duke
- **Fiolina Germi**
- **Hanzo Hattori** (Note: Shares most of his moves (and a special intro) with Nagase.)
- **Hyena**
- Iori Yagami
- **Jivatma** (Note: Boss character)
- K'
- **Kim Kaphwan**
- **Kula Diamond**
- Kyo Kusanagi
- **Kyo Kusanagi Classic** (Note: Kyo Kusanagi with a moveset based on KOF '95, and depicted in his outfit from the Orochi and NESTS saga.)
- Leona Heidern
- Lien Neville
- **Lilly Kane**
- **Luise Meyrink**
- Mai Shiranui
- Maxima
- Mignon Beart
- **Mr. Karate II** (Note: Ryo Sakazaki's Buriki One version.)
- **Nagase**
- **Nightmare Geese**
- **Ninon Beart**
- Ralf Jones
- **Richard Meyer**
- Rock Howard
- Ryo Sakazaki
- Seth
- Soiree Meira
- Terry Bogard
- **Wild Wolf** (Note: Terry Bogard's Garou: Mark of the Wolves version.)
- Yuri Sakazaki

== Development ==
Examples of sketches by Falcoon who developed multiple outfits for every character present in the game.

While the game's narrative depends on the player chosen, writer Akihiko Ureshino wrote a novelization on the game's official website, making bigger emphasis on the newer character created for the 3D games. When it comes to designs, every playable characters has access to multiple outfits. Terry Bogard wears both classic and more modern outfits which bothered Ureshino. This is mostly due to the age difference Terry and Rock has as Terry is 24 years old in Fatal Fury and The King of Fighters but 35 in Garou: Mark of the Wolves. Meanwhile, Rock is only 17 Garou: Mark of the Wolves, making the time gap in Maximum Impact not fitting. As a result, even if Rock stands next to him, they look more like brothers than stepfather in KOF. That is why Ureshino feel uncomfortable when the two of them talk in demo scenes and the like. As a result, SNK solved this discomfort by setting Maximum Impact in an alternate timeline where Geese Howard is already dead, making it nearly the Garou: Mark of the Wolves timeline.

Falcoon returned as main artist. Kyo Kusanagi's jacket was redesigned while keeping the appeal of the original costume. He that attempting to change an "untouchable" design such as Iori's put him under severe pressure. He stated that creating Iori's alternative design that appears in the Maximum Impact series almost felt "unforgivable" because he felt unsure of fans' reaction to the change. Leona's involves Heidern's clothing, including her eyepatch. Another outfit is a reference to Neon Genesis Evangelion character Rei Ayanami. The normal costume of K' that has uniform levels of a hard image throughout. Whether it's his "color E" with its overflowing roughness that is evocative of a wild dog or his "color G" that emphasizes himself as a motorcyclist, this is a design that has succeeded in magnifying his image on many levels regardless of the variation according to Falcoon. Him exposing his upper-half with his "another color" and having characteristics such as sunglasses on him, a wild image of him is portrayed.

Athena's The King of Fighters '98 look was the basis for it, it is piece of "cute clothing that she has per her heart and soul into". On the other hand, her "Another" is a "school wear" outfit with glasses according to the staff. In his blog during the game's development, game script writer Akihiko Ureshino joked that the new version of Mai's design "feels like her fabric area has decreased despite her increasing beauty", though he was worried some variations may be removed from the final game for being too overt.

Ryo's normal costume for the Maximum Impact series is the same as the martial arts uniform he has worn in Art of Fighting, The King of Fighters and Fatal Fury Special. There is a change of mood concerning his "Color F" reminiscent of Haohmaru from Samurai Shodown. Regarding his "Color G~H", his refined sense is shown through his braided hat, ruler, and mountain ascetic style. For the "Mr. Karate" incarnation of Ryo, his Normal has been given a tengu mask, which is reminiscent of his father Takuma. With his "Another" incarnation there is a stylish change of clothing based on his Wild Ambition look. The color combination of his shirt is standard, but there is also a version just like his "Color E" with a design on his back. "Color G" appears as a style that brings to mind the clothing of Robert.

Some of Yuri's extra normal outfits make her look like fellow Kyokugen practitioners; color scheme B makes her look like Ryo (blond hair, orange gi, and black tights), while scheme F resembles Robert Garcia's outfit from The King of Fighters '99 to 2002, which consists of brown hair, an orange gi with black long-sleeved tights, and no headband. Ralf retains his 2003 outfit but with a red jacket. His Armored Ralf version from the same game is very different from the original Ralf, as his skin is darker and his hair is lighter. He additionally sports a green jacket, military pants, a white T-shirt and a green headband instead of his red bandana. He was also given green protectors in his hands which have spikes. The additional outfits from the common Ralf are cosplays from Marco Rossi from the Metal Slug series and Jack Turner from the Art of Fighting series.

== Revisions ==
=== Regulation A ===
A sequel (and update) to Maximum Impact 2, it was released for the Taito Type X2 arcade system in Japan on July 14, 2007. It is the only arcade release made for the KOF: MI series and includes Ash Crimson, Blue Mary, Makoto Mizoguchi from Data East's Fighter's History series, and newcomer Xiao Lon, who is a Hizoku Assassin like her agnate brother, Duo Lon, into its character roster. Regulation A is a remake of Maximum Impact 2, but with the classic 3-on-3 gameplay from the 2D KOF series added in hopes of winning over the series fanbase as well as new players. Armored Ralf was removed from the update version due to issues with his gameplay.

Despite the addition of four new characters, Armor Ralf has been removed, as have several stages, as well as the story and challenge modes from Maximum Impact 2. In addition, all of the characters have lost half of their outfits in both normal and alternate types. Some new music has been added, including songs from the original Maximum Impact and Sengoku 3, in addition to new alternate versions of existing stages and a new stage for Makoto Mizoguchi.

The game was also released for the PlayStation 2 in Japan, on July 26, 2007. It was planned for release in the U.S. along with RA2 and Maximum Impact 3, but were cancelled due to the timing of KOF XII.

=== Regulation A2 ===
A sequel to KOF: Maximum Impact Regulation A was announced for the PlayStation 2 and Taito Type X2 at the Tokyo Game Show 2007. Many believed that the game was put on hold due to the development of The King of Fighters XII, but it was later canceled.

== Reception ==
Reception

Aggregate score
Aggregator	Score
Metacritic	66

Review scores
Publication	Score
1Up.com	B+
Eurogamer	4.0/10
GameSpot	7.3/10
Power Unlimited	74%

The game received mixed and average responses from game journalists according to Metacritic. Greg Kasavin from GameSpot ranked the game as good, giving it a score of 7.3 over 10. He commented while the game was highly improved from its prequel, it had many issues. Use of 3D graphics, although being praised too for being "good in most cases", did not make changes to fights in comparison to 2D games from the series. However, he praised the variability of playable characters with different moves as well as their alternative costumes. 1Up.com reviewer Richard Li rated the game as B+. He also praised the use of alternative costumes, commenting they "make even the most seasoned fan chuckle." He praised the mechanics from fights by saying they are much better from the first Maximum Impact, allowing the players to use new tactics to defeat his/her opponent.

The game sold 56,431 units in Japan. In retrospect, Retronauts does not consider Maximum Impact 2 a good fighting game but the amount of alternative outfits created for all the characters appeals to gamers wanting more fanservice from SNK's characters. The game was nominated to the "PSXE's 2006 Game of the Year Awards" in the category Best Fighting Game, but it lost to Tekken 5: Dark Resurrection.

Regulation A was popular in Japan according to IGN attributing it to the longtime fame of the PlayStation 2, praising the return of the team combat and large amount of modes available. Meanwhile, HardcoreGaming101 claimed the game was released because the fans of the series was more open to arcade releases in contrast to the previous two games released for consoles. He saw the inclusion of Ash and the other new characters positive for the update but criticized SNK's decision to remove several modes present in the original Maximum Impact 2 and panned the announcer that yells every fight of the game.

== Anime ==
- The King of Fighters: Another Day
- Japanese DVD cover art

ザ・キング・オブ・ファイターズ アナザーデイ (Za Kingu Obu Faitāzu Anazādei)
- Genre: Action, Drama
- Original net animation
- Directed by: Masaki Tachibana
- Written by: Fumio Asanuma
- Music by: Daiki Kasho
- Studio: Production I.G; SNK
- Released: December 2, 2005 – March 3, 2006
- Runtime: 32 minutes (total)
- Episodes: 4

The tie-in animated series, The King of Fighters: Another Day, was released in 2005-06. The four-episode series was produced and animated by Production I.G, and revolves around the plot of KOF: Maximum Impact, along with some touches of the current storyline about Ash Crimson, who joined the MI gang in the arcade game, The King of Fighters: Maximum Impact Regulation A. The ONA series was included with the Japanese release of Maximum Impact 2.

=== Voice Cast ===
Character	Japanese voice actor	English voice actor
Soiree Meira	Koji Haramaki	Ed Bishop
Kyo Kusanagi	Masahiro Nonaka	Andrew Roth
Iori Yagami	Kunihiko Yasui	Eric Summerer
Alba Meira	Hiroyuki Satō	Jayson Wooley
Mai Shiranui	Akoya Sogi	Sheryl Stanley
Rock Howard	Eiji Takemoto	Mike Lane
Lien Neville	Fumiko Inoue	Claire Caponigro
Athena Asamiya	Haruna Ikezawa	Lily Kong
Luise Meyrink	Hiroko Tsuji	Katrin Biemann
Maxima	Katsuyuki Konishi	Mike Jarmus
Ralf Jones	Monster Maezuka	Scott Casey
Terry Bogard	Satoshi Hashimoto	Tony Carroll
Billy Kane	Seijirō	Marc Donovan
Ash Crimson	Sōnosuke Nagashiro	Duke Clement
Clark Still	Yoshinori Shima	Sean Michaels
K′	Yuuki Matsuda	Andrew Scott

=== Production ===
Another Day was announced at Tokyo Games 2005. It was directed by Masaki Tachibana. aired in Japan through the internet on ShowTime and GyaO while it aired on TV via Animax and Kids Station. The ending theme is "Regret" by Dakota Star.

No.	Title	Original release date
1	"All Out"	December 2, 2005
The story starts after the events of The King of Fighters: Maximum Impact. After the demise of Duke and his gang, Alba and Soiree Meira now spend their days protecting the citizens of Southtown. During the night, a fire breaks out in the city. With Alba away at the time, Soiree leads the rescue effort and rallies the rest of their gang to help. After he saves a young girl from a burning building, Soiree fights Iori Yagami, who was searching for the cause of the fire. They continue their fight in a church until Soiree moves to shield the girl he saved earlier from the building's collapsing ceiling; they were rescued by the joint efforts of Athena Asamiya and Mai Shiranui. The scene shifts to dawn with Soiree digging through the rubble (trying to find Iori) until Alba informs him that Iori survived. Alba also shows that he had rescued the two last survivors of the fire - a couple of kittens. Relieved that everyone is safe, Soiree collapses, exhausted.
2	"Accede"	January 6, 2006
The second chapter begins with Rock Howard experiencing a nightmare of him fighting Terry Bogard in a situation that mirrors Geese Howard's death. He leaves the apartment he shares with Terry and sees the town in flames. A blue light beam fired over Geese Tower draws his attention, prompting him to head there to investigate. On the tower's rooftop, Billy Kane and Lien Neville, who was sent to kill people related to Geese, are fighting. Billy hangs her beyond the roof with his pole when Rock arrives at the scene. Disagreeing with Billy's insistence to drop Lien, Rock fights with him and rescues Lien from losing her grip from the roof's edge. Billy then claims that Rock shames the legacy of his father and decides to kill him and Lien. However, Lien calls for reinforcements and the roof is fired with the same beam from moments ago. Rock asks her if killing him would free him from the shadow of Geese. She answers that it is up to him. Inside the building, they see the remains of a wall where a portrait of Rock's mother was presumably displayed. When Rock returns home, Terry leaves him for a nap and tells Rock to wake him when breakfast is ready. Rock notices the picture of his mother underneath Terry's jacket, muttering thanks to Terry for his kindness.
3	"In the Dark"	February 3, 2006
At the beginning of the third chapter, we see K′ and Maxima sabotaging the tunnel system in Southtown (while the fire is raging), trying to find out the whereabouts of the "Kyo clone" and a kidnapped scientist called Makishima. However, Maxima trips some electric wires, plunging Southtown into a blackout and causing their covert activity to be noticed by Heidern and he sends Leona, Ralf and Clark to investigate. K' and Maxima attempt to elude their pursuers by boarding a subway train but Heidern's team catches up to them. Ralf accuses the duo of kidnapping the scientist and they start fighting. After 24 seconds of calculated fighting, Maxima grabs K' and escapes into another train going the opposite direction. There, they are reunited with the rest of their party, Whip and Kula.
4	"All Over"	March 3, 2006
Here is where the previous chapters' stories intertwine with Kyo Kusanagi rising from the city's rubble and rescuing a victim. He sees a green flame and knowing the source to be Ash Crimson, he gives pursuit. Watching atop a building, Ash drops a radio antenna from up there, forcing Kyo to defend himself with his flames. Alba arrives on the scene and, after witnessing this event, concludes that Kyo started the fire and fights with the supposed criminal. Amused, Ash watches them until Iori attacks him. Frustrated by the intrusion, he escapes with the fire in the city also vanishing along with him. Heidern's team of Ikari warriors watch Alba and Kyo's fight, which continues despite the fire's disappearance. Confusing Kyo for a clone, Ralf plots to attack him until Iori arrives and says that it is the real Kyo, stopping the fight afterwards. After he learns that Ash was the real arsonist, Alba apologizes to Kyo and the three fighters part ways. As the sun rises, Alba is shown finding the two kittens that he rescues in the first episode. The final scene shows Ralf asking if Kyo isn't really a clone while lighting a cigarette. Kyo, lighting his flame, asks Ralf if he would like to find out. After the credits of this episode, there is a cutscene to the crumbled down church (where Alba, Soiree and the little girl are at the end of the first episode), in which Luise Meyrink appears (hinting the story will continue onward to Maximum Impact 2).

=== Home media ===
The anime was released in Japan via DVD as a pack-in with the Japanese release of Maximum Impact 2 on April 27, 2006 under a retail price of 7, 140 Yen. The DVD is region two-encoded, but has English subtitles and dub track.

The U.S. marketing strategy of The King of Fighters: Another Day was far less accessible. Originally intended to be included with KOF 2006 as a pre-order/early buyer bonus for customers of EBGames and GameStop, the U.S. arm of SNK failed to ship out the discs in conjunction with its release. Several weeks later, after some complaint from angry fans, the bonus DVDs started showing up at EBGames and GameStop locations and in many cases were obtainable for previous buyers upon request, yet quantities were limited and many are still left without it despite their devotion.

The U.S. DVD comes in a square cardboard envelope. The DVD is region one encoded and includes both English and Japanese subtitles and audio, both in Stereo and Dolby Digital 5.1. Special features include commentary on all episodes, character design galleries for major characters appearing in the series, one trailer for the animated series and three Japanese commercials for KOF: Maximum Impact 2.
