= Falcoon =

Japanese artist

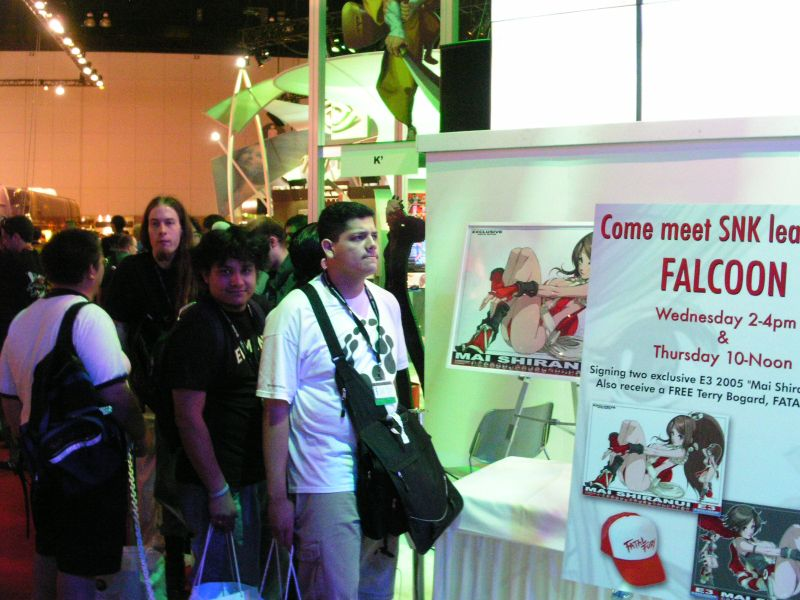
Signing of limited edition posters of Mai Shiranui by Falcoon at the E3 2005

Tatsuhiko Kanaoka (金岡龍彦, Kanaoka Tatsuhiko), better known by his pen name Falcoon (ファルコン, Farukon) is a Japanese artist. He works for SNK. He has been involved in several iterations of The King of Fighters franchise.

== Career ==
After graduating from Kyoto Seika University, Falcoon started as a fan-artist doing renditions games of different companies, such as The King of Fighters, Street Fighter, and JoJo's Bizarre Adventure. Falcoon joined SNK in 1998 as a card designer for SNK vs. Capcom: Card Fighters' Clash. He was chosen to create the ingame artwork for SVC Chaos: SNK vs. Capcom. Falcoon mostly contributed on character designs and was responsible for the character artwork for The King of Fighters 2003. He was responsible for the alternate designs and new characters seen in the KOF: Maximum Impact series and was the KOF:MI series' producer and art director. Falcoon left SNK Playmore sometime in 2008 or 2009 for undisclosed reasons. All projects related to the Maximum Impact series were officially cancelled in October 2009.

He's now working for SNK in one of their subsidiary, SNK Entertainment.

== Style ==
His art is recognized by its heavy emphasis on muscle and weight for both genders, shaded with sharp gradients and highlights. His designs are influenced by the clothing found in Japanese street fashion, particularly Lolita and Fruits fashions. In interviews, he insisted that he uses no reference for his work, relying only on "strong images from memory".

== Works ==
- Off Beat Racer! - first work; part of debugger team
- SNK vs. Capcom: Card Fighters' Clash
- SNK vs. Capcom: Card Fighters 2 Expand Edition - main illustrator
- SNK vs. Capcom: Card Fighters DS - producer and main illustrator
- Capcom vs. SNK (promotional)
- Capcom vs. SNK 2 (promotional)
- SNK vs. Capcom: SVC Chaos (promotional, cover image)
- The King of Fighters 2003 - main illustrator
- The King of Fighters XI - special ending artwork; also part of story development
- KOF: Maximum Impact - character designer
- KOF: Maximum Impact 2 - producer, character designer and art director
- KOF: Maximum Impact Regulation A - producer, character designer and art director
- The King of Fighters: Another Day - original character designer
- The King of Fighters '98 Ultimate Match - art director
