= Characters of the Art of Fighting series =

Fictional character

The entire cast of the Art of Fighting trilogy as illustrated by Tomohiro Nakata for the franchise's 30th anniversary

The following is a list of video game characters featured in the Art of Fighting fighting game series developed by SNK. The Art of Fighting series serves as a prequel to the Fatal Fury series, with the three games taking place between 1978 and 1980, over a decade before the events of Fatal Fury: King of Fighters. The initial two games are set in South Town, the same setting as the Fatal Fury series, as martial artists Ryo Sakazaki and Robert Garcia face several foes after Ryo's sister Yuri went missing. The second Art of Fighting 2 is a direct sequel starring far more playable characters with the leads alongside Yuri and Ryo's father Takuma participating in the King of Fighters tournament in order to have revenge against the host Geese Howard for orchestrating Yuri's kidnapping. The third Art of Fighting game takes place in the fictional Mexican town of Glasshill Valley as several fighters travel around the area for their own purposes with Ryo and Yuri searching for the missing Robert.

Many characters from both Art of Fighting and Fatal Fury appear in The King of Fighters series, which is set in its own universe that ignores the continuity established in the Art of Fighting and Fatal Fury games so that the characters from both series could battle without having to age any of them. Ryo Sakazaki and his allies are also featured as guest characters in other games such as Buriki One, Neo Geo Battle Coliseum and Capcom vs. SNK. In certain games, Ryo has aged and became his father's successor under the new alias Mr. Karate.

== Creation ==
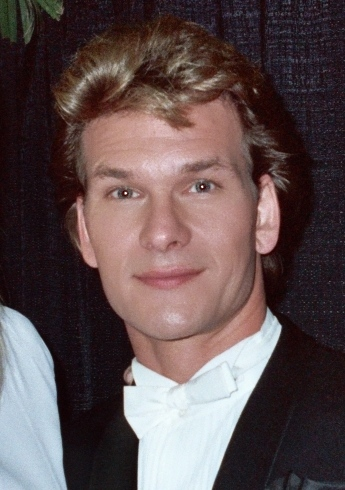
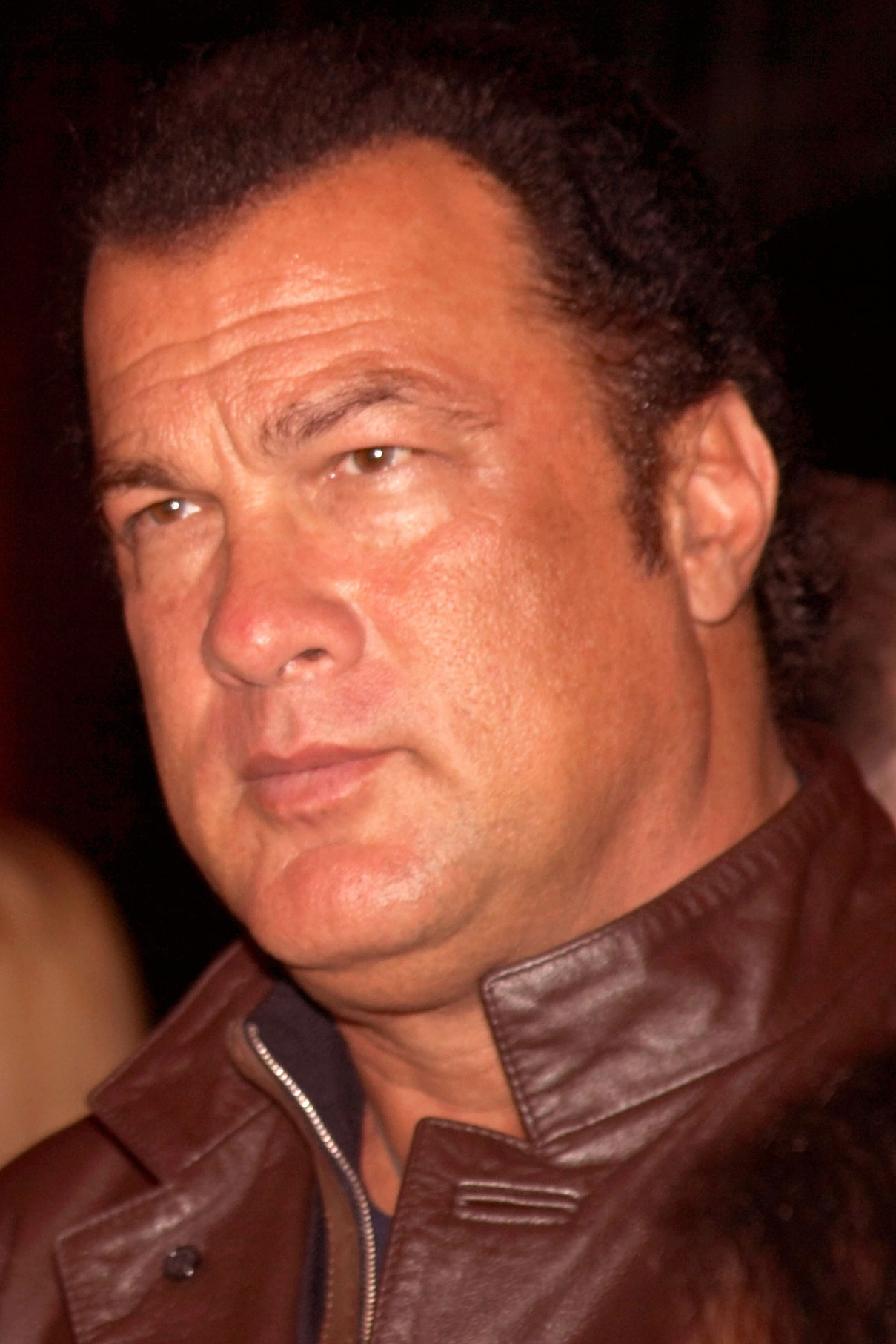
Patrick Swayze (left) and Steven Seagal (right) inspired Ryo Sakazaki and Robert Garcia, respectively.

Shortly after the release of the fighting game Street Fighter's release, a headhunter approached director Takashi Nishiyama and convinced him to leave Capcom and join nearby studio SNK. Nishiyama took planner Hiroshi Matsumoto and the majority of his team with him and abandoned the Street Fighter IP. In SNK, Matsumoto directed the fighting game Art of Fighting starring the leads Ryo Sakazaki and Robert Garcia. The cast were created by Matsumoto as an homage to the Capcom fighting games' characters. Artist Youichiro Soeda said that Ryo Sakazaki and Robert Garcia's debut was unique to other games based on the company because the story did not focus on fighting tournaments but instead on the duo's quest to save Yuri Sakazaki. From the marketing side, SNK wanted to show the characters as big sized as possible on screen, leading to the zoom ins when they get close. In the early development prototype, this was so extreme that characters were only visible from their knees to upper body as they got closer on the screen. However, this changed and development scaled this down to be more manageable. Nevertheless, they still accomplished their goal of having some of the biggest and most detailed sprites among the fighting games of that generation.

While Ryo was modeled after American actor Patrick Swayze, Robert's inspiration comes from different personalities such as Steven Seagal, Andy Garcia and Don Johnson. Since the game primarily had mainly men, the staff had problems deciding on a female fighter. This eventually resulted in the creation of King created to be strong as modeled after was the actress Grace Jones famous for the James Bond franchise. However, the final design was more andrdogynous almost llike a man. Meanwhile, the other female character, Yuri, was given a more fragile portrayal despite having the same voice as King. The staff used voices for the characters. In charge of the art was Shinkiro who has said he had no problems with designing Ryo because he himself had not been rich. Designing Robert Garcia, who was rich, caused him "trouble".

SNK developer Yasuyuki Oda reflected that both Art of Fighting and the other IP Fatal Fury seemed to appeal to fans of male-oriented series like Fist of the North Star and Dragon Ball. The first game was famous for exploring Southtown, the setting of Fatal Fury. The inclusion of portraying several macho fighters led to dilemma of including more female character with Mai Shiranui standing out as SNK's first female fighter. With Mai's high popularity in Fatal Fury, SNK decided to include Yuri in Art of Fighting 2 as a playable character which received similar response. In Art of Fighting, there are so many villains, but everyone acts polite. They don't lay hands on anyone until it's a fair fight, and they don't sneak up on the player from behind. Yuri's popularity led to the creation of unique characters related to her but none of them made it to the actual game until her ending sequence. For the new characters, SNK were unable to connect them to the story, so that meant they had more freedom in designing them. The idea was making clashy and cool designs like Kisaragai, and Temjin. Ryuhaku Todoh was also an early candidate for inclusion in Art of Fighting, but for some reason was later dropped. Yuri's popularity led to the creation of unique characters related to her but none of them made it to the actual game until her ending sequence. Geese Howard's popularity in Fatal Fury and his younger look from the first original video animation influenced his appearance in Art of Fighting 2 as a hidden boss.

Art of Fighting 3 the first game in the series to use motion capture for its animation inspired by Virtua Fighter. Ryo was modified to feel more realistic to play. In retrospect, they felt that the only way to know Ryo's story was playing Art of Fighting as SNK kept developing KOF among other products where Ryo was playable but was not explored. In regards to the third Art of Figthting, the game was noted to be called "Gaiden" (lit. "alternative story") as a result of the story focusing now on Robert rather than Ryo. Ryo's rivalry with Kasumi Todoh in Art of Fighting 3 was created as a parallel to Art of Fighting where as both fighters are looking for their relatives.

== Characters ==
=== Introduced in Art of Fighting ===
In the original Art of Fighting, only Ryo and Robert are playable in the single-player mode; all others can only be used in the game's Vs. mode.

==== Ryo Sakazaki ====
Voiced by: Masaki Usui (AOF–NGBC, KOF XIII), Tetsuya Bessho (AOF anime), Akira Kamiya (KOF '94 Drama CD), Masayoshi Kozaki (KOF XII), Daiki Takakura (KOF XIV onwards), Subaru Kimura (KOF for Girls) (Japanese); Alden Crews (AOF anime,) Craig Lee Thomas (FF:COTW) (English)

Ryo Sakazaki (リョウ・サカザキ, Ryō Sakazaki; sometimes written as 坂崎 亮, Sakazaki Ryō) is a skilled martial artist who practices his family's fighting style, Kyokugenryu Karate, acting as the top disciple alongside his sister Yuri, his father and sensei Takuma, and his best friend Robert Garcia. In the original game, Ryo searches South Town for Yuri after she is abducted by Mr. Big. In the sequel, following Yuri's rescue, Ryo and his family join the first ever King of Fighters tournament held by Geese Howard, the true mastermind behind Yuri's kidnapping. In Art of Fighting 3, when Robert disappears looking for Freia Lawrence, Ryo travels to Glasshill Valley to find him. Many years later, Ryo becomes master of the Kyokugenryu School, inheriting the title of "Mr. Karate" from his father as of Buriki One. He also takes on his own student, Marco Rodrigues, who features as a playable character in Garou: Mark of the Wolves and Fatal Fury: City of the Wolves. Ryo was created as an homage to the characters from Capcom's Street Fighter series, which members of the development team previously worked on. This would in turn later lead to the creation of the Street Fighter character Dan Hibiki as a satire of Ryo and Robert.

==== Robert Garcia ====
Voiced by: Eiji Yano (AOF), Masanori Ikeda (AOF anime), Kazuhiro Inage (AOF2, KOF '94–'95, NeoGeo Battle Coliseum, KOF XI–XIII), Hideo Ishikawa (KOF '94 Drama CD), Mantarou Kouichi (AOF3, KOF '96–2003), Go Shinomiya (KOF XIV onwards), Kazuhiro Okamoto (KOF for Girls) (Japanese); Nick Sullivan (AOF anime), River Vitae (FF:COTW) (English)

Robert Garcia (ロバート・ガルシア, Robāto Garushia) is Ryo's best friend and fellow Kyokugenryu student. He is the wayward son of a billionaire family from Italy, sent to train with Takuma as a favor to Robert's father. Robert is introduced in the first Art of Fighting, when he helps Ryo rescue Yuri from the criminal Mr. Big. As such, both Ryo Sakazaki and Robert go to South Town to interrogate fighters until finding Mr. Big. The second Art of Fighting game features Robert joining the Sakazakis in entering the first King of Fighters tournament. In Art of Fighting 3, Robert visits Central America to help his childhood friend Freia Lawrence, who is being pursued by Wyler. An older version of Robert appears a playable character in Fatal Fury: City of the Wolves via downloadable content, in which he enters the King of Fighters tournament to try and unlock the final secret Kyokugen technique, using the alias of Mr. Karate to hide his identity.

Robert also appears in The King of Fighters as part of the Art of Fighting Team while an older persona appears playable in Neo Geo Battle Coliseum which acts as hidden character in The King of Fighters XI.

==== Ryuhaku Todoh ====
Voiced by: Takayuki Sakai (AOF), Takeshi Aono (AOF anime, CVS2) (Japanese); James Carter Cathcart (AOF anime) (English)

Ryuhaku Todoh (藤堂竜白, Tōdō Ryūhaku) is the first opponent in the arcade mode of Art of Fighting. He is the creator and main teacher of the Todoh fighting style, which derives from Jujutsu, Kendo and Kobujutsu. Todoh has a long-standing rivalry with disciples of the Kyokugenryu school of karate and considers them a threat to his dojo in terms of profits; and also there is a long-standing personal animosity dating back to a rivalry with the Kyokugenryu karate master Takuma Sakazaki which began when both men were very young. Todoh is the only character from Art of Fighting to not return in Art of Fighting 2. He is playable in Capcom vs. SNK 2 and makes a cameo in SVC Chaos.

==== Jack Turner ====
Voiced by: Ginzō Matsuo (AOF anime), Chiaki Tamura (FF:COTW) (Japanese); Eric Stuart (AOF anime), Joe Hernandez (FF:COTW) (English)

Jack Turner (ジャック・ターナー, Jaku Tānā) is a leader of the South Town gang known as the Neo Black Cats, and a developer of his own fighting style. During Art of Fighting, he work as Mr. Big's highest-ranking subordinates, with a job to devastate anyone who crosses his path. In Fatal Fury: City of the Wolves, set over 30 years later, Jack no longer works for Big and now holds a grudge towards him.

==== Lee Pai Long ====
Voiced by: Eiji Yano (AOF), Kazuhiro Inage (AOF2)

Lee Pai Long (Chinese: 李白龍) is a master of Chinese martial arts from Taiwan and an expert of his country's medicine. His adoptive father and mentor, Lee Gakusuo, passed on his pharmaceutic knowledge and martial arts to him before instructing Lee to finish his studies in South Town. Once he arrived there, Lee became fascinated with the local style of Kenpo and neglected his roots to be a street fighter. He works as the director of the South Town prison, but also has a small herbal shop which he runs part-time. A former adversary and long-time friend of Ryo Sakazaki's father Takuma, he enters the tournament to test Ryo's skills. And like his friend, he dons a mask; in this case, a Monkey Mask.

==== King ====
Voiced by: Harumi Ikoma (games, KOF: D), Masako Katsuki (AOF anime), Yumi Tōma (KOF '94 Drama CD) (Japanese); Sharon Becker (AOF anime) (English)

King (キング, Kingu) is a female Muay Thai fighter from France who dresses as a man in order to present herself as a reliable fighter, hide her true identity, and for various other reasons such as the fact that she has been at war with her own sex for years. Originally, her true gender was meant to be a surprise for the player, revealed only if she was defeated with a special move; as time went by, however, her design became more feminine, albeit without straying too far from the original concept. In the first Art of Fighting, King is hired by the criminal Mr. Big to work as a bouncer in his tournament. After King is defeated by Ryo Sakazaki and Robert Garcia who were searching for Ryo's kidnapped sister, Yuri, King agrees to help them to find Mr. Big. In Art of Fighting 2, King enters into the first of the King of Fighters tournament in order to win the prize money to pay for an operation for her younger brother, Jan, to regain the use of his legs. As such, Ryo and Robert decide to use the prize money to pay for the operation in gratitude for helping them to find Yuri.

She is commonly playable in The King of Fighters as part of the Women Fighters/Heroines Team as well as the Art of Fighting Team.

==== Mickey Rogers ====
Voiced by: Kazuhiro Inage (AOF–AOF2)

Mickey Rogers (ミッキー・ロジャース, Mikkī Rojāsu) is a former professional boxer who was expelled from the ranks after he accidentally killed a man in the ring. He currently stalks South Town seeking opponents to vent his anger and frustration on, and enters the tournament for the same reason. Like Crawley, Mickey gets a haircut between his two appearances. In Art of Fighting, Mickey becomes a small-time hood who works for Mr. Big so that he can get money as a street hustler.

==== John Crawley ====
Voiced by: Masaki Usui (AOF–AOF2), Kaneto Shiozawa (AOF anime) (Japanese); Eric Stuart (AOF anime) (English)

John Crawley (ジョン・クローリー, Jon Kuraurei) is a martial arts instructor, and with his brutal and aggressive fighting style was known to his friends as "The Madman" and "The Killing Machine". He enters the tournament to win the prize money and test his skills. In the first AOF, Crawley has longer hair. By the time AOF2 occurs, his hair is cut shorter. In John's AOF2 ending, the US Military attempts to recruit him to rescue the President's canary, but John refuses. Although it is not mentioned in the game, John seems to be assigned to the aircraft carrier USS Independence, since a large "62" is visible on the ship's island.

==== Mr. Big ====
Voiced by: Iemasa Kayumi (AOF anime), Masaru Naka (KOF '96, KOF '98: UM), Nobuyuki Yuki (KOF XI, NGBC), Yūki Ono (KOF film), Yuki Arai (KOF:D onwards), Aya Saito (Pretty Big; KOFAS) (Japanese); Cliff Lazenby (AOF anime), Marc Graue (FF:COTW) (English)

Mr. Big (Mr.ビッグ, Misutā Biggu), whose real name is James (ジェームス, Jēmusu) is the sub-boss character from the first two Art of Fighting games. Mr. Big was formerly in the Army's Special Forces, and fights skillfully with a pair of eskrima rattan sticks. He has been involved with the mob for as long as he can remember. He made it big in South Town, a city as seedy and corrupt as he is. He joins Geese Howard's criminal organization, soon becoming his right-hand man. Big secretly feared Takuma Sakazaki, the master of Kyokugenryu Karate, so he ordered the kidnapping of Takuma's daughter, Yuri, and threatened Takuma into working for him. The plan backfired when Ryo and Robert fought their way through South Town's crime to find both of them, beating Big senseless to rescue Yuri and Takuma. King worked as a bouncer at one of Mr. Big's establishments. Mr. Big appears as downloadable content in Fatal Fury: City of the Wolves, the story of which takes place over 30 years after his initial appearance, making him the second Art of Fighting character to be playable in a Fatal Fury game following Ryo. Big is revealed to have been keeping Geese Howard's wife Marie hostage as a bargaining chip. Kain R. Heinlein and Billy Kane successfully negotiate for her release in exchange for evidence Geese had that implicated Big in the death of Takuma Sakazaki's wife Lonette.

Outside of the main series, Mr. Big is also present in The King of Fighters '96 and The King of Fighters '98: Ultimate Match as part of a Boss Team with Geese Howard and Wolfang Krauser. Additionally, he appears in Neo Geo Battle Coliseum.

==== Takuma Sakazaki ====
Voiced by: Takayuki Sakai (AOF), Eiji Tsuda (AOF2–KOF XIII), Hōchū Ōtsuka (KOF '94 Drama CD), Takeshi Maruyama (KOFAS)

Takuma Sakazaki (タクマ・サカザキ, Takuma Sakazaki); also written as Sakazaki Takuma (坂崎 拓馬) is Ryo and Yuri's father who left them prior to the first Art of Fighting, though as the master and creator of Kyokugenryu Karate, he has taught both Ryo and Robert at a young age, with Yuri becoming his student later on after the first game. Takuma appears as the final boss of the game as a masked warrior named Mr. Karate (Mr.カラテ, Misutā Karate), having taken Yuri as a hostage. Before being defeated by Ryo and Robert, Yuri stops them, revealing his identity. It is later revealed that Takuma was forced to work for Geese Howard and that his right-hand man, Mr. Big, kidnapped Yuri to put him under control. In Art of Fighting 2, Takuma rebels against Geese and Mr. Big by fighting in their King of Fighters tournament, but retreats due to injuries sustained.

=== Introduced in Art of Fighting 2 ===
==== Yuri Sakazaki ====
Voiced by: Harumi Ikoma (AOF), Kaori Horie (AOF2–KOF XIII), Ayumi Hamasaki (AOF anime, AOF2 TV commercials), Sakura Tange (KOF '94 Drama CD), Ai Kakuma (KOF XIV onwards) (Japanese); Veronica Taylor (AOF anime), Maddie Matsumoto (FF:COTW) (English)

Yuri Sakazaki (ユリ・サカザキ, Yuri Sakazaki; sometimes written as 坂崎 ゆり, Sakazaki Yuri) is the younger sister of Ryo and daughter of Takuma. She is introduced in the first game as the hostage of Mr. Big, prompting Ryo and Robert to rescue her. She makes her playable debut in Art of Fighting 2, having been trained by Takuma in Kyokugenryu to defend herself, and teams up with her family to defeat Geese Howard. In Art of Fighting 3, Yuri is once again unplayable, but she appears along with Ryo searching for Robert; she was later made playable in the game's update, Art of Fighting 3 R. By the time of Fatal Fury: City of the Wolves, Yuri has started her own fitness club, where her brother's disciple Marco Rodrigues trains after his dojo's sign is stolen, and her club also serves as one of Joe Higashi's sponsors alongside Pao Pao Cafe, and Cheng Sinzan's company.

==== Eiji Kisaragi ====
Voiced by: Yoshinori Shima (AOF2–KOF XI), Eiji Tsuda (KOF '98: UM)

Eiji Kisaragi (如月 影二, Kisaragi Eiji) is a Japanese ninja from the feared and respected Kisaragi clan, whose techniques dates back from ancient history, through his ancestor Zantetsu, from The Last Blade series. His school is the sworn enemy of both the Sakazaki clan and Kyokugenryu Karate. Eiji is a mercenary, willing to kill for anyone so long as they pay well.

The character is also present in The King of Fighters '95 as part of the Rival Team with Iori Yagami and Billy Kane. He also returns in The King of Fighters 98: Ultimate Match as a single entry as well as in The King of Fighters XI as part of the Anti-Art of Fighting Team alongside Kasumi Todoh and Malin, with his current goal in the eleventh tournament is to get revenge on Iori for betraying him and Billy at the end of the second tournament.

==== Temjin ====
Voiced by: Yoshinori Shima

Temjin (テムジン) is the only Mongolian dock worker at the South Town port. Temjin resigned himself to a period of menial work as a manure loader. Finding the job paid $25 an hour, Temjin stayed on, earning money for the small school in Mongolia where he dreams of teaching one day.

=== Introduced in Art of Fighting 3: The Path of the Warrior ===
Ryo and Robert are the only returning characters in Art of Fighting 3, with all other playable characters being newcomers. Yuri and King were later added in the game's 3 R re-release.

==== Jin Fu-Ha ====
Voiced by: JAI

Jin Fu-Ha (不破刃) is a former disciple of Eiji Kisaragi, who betrayed him. He then decides to kill Eiji, testing himself by first attempting to defeat Eiji's sworn enemy Ryo Sakazaki.

==== Karman Cole ====
Voiced by: Mantarō Koichi

Karman Cole (カーマン・コール) is a long-time employee of the Garcia family, acting in a personal assistant-like role to Robert since he was a child. The Garcias send Karman to find their son after he disappeared to look for his old childhood friend Freia Lawrence, which has led him to Glasshill Valley. Karman is a loyal employee who seems very fond of Robert Garcia and lets him get away with much more than he should.

==== Kasumi Todoh ====
Voiced by: Masae Yumi

Kasumi Todoh (藤堂香澄, Tōdō Kasumi) is the daughter of Ryuhaku Todoh, who taught her the Todoh school of Aikido, Jujutsu and Kendo. As her family's sole heir, she does all she can to stand up for the Todoh way. When Ryuhaku left for South Town to settle an old score with Takuma Sakazaki, Kasumi remained waiting for her father's return. Months later, after learning Ryuhaku was defeated by Takuma's son Ryo, she decides to find and challenge him to avenge her father's defeat. Kasumi reappears in several The King of Fighters tournament serving as a member of the Women Fighters Team as well as an anti-Kyokugen Ryu Team in The King of Fighters XI.

==== Lenny Creston ====
Voiced by: Kumi Ishida

Lenny Kreston (レニィ・クレストン) is a private investigator who works with Rody Birts. She is a tough, straight-talking woman who wields a whip, but with a caring nature underneath. Though there seems to be some romantic tension between them, she and Rody are partners in a business sense only. They have been hired by Wyler to find and deliver Freia Lawrence to him. The two appear to have a bad reputation within their profession and Lenny sees their new assignment as their 'big chance'.

==== Rody Birts ====
Voiced by: Eiji Yano

Rody Birts (ロディ・バーツ) is a private investigator who works with Lenny Creston. Though she dominates him, their relationship is good-natured and there is even a hint of romantic tension. The two appear to have a bad reputation as private eyes. He goes to Glasshill Valley to search for Freia Lawrence on orders from Wyler.

==== Wang Koh-San ====
Voiced by: Monster Maezuka

Wang Koh-San (Chinese: 王覚山) is an artist entering a competition, and is also a friend of Lee Pai Long. He comes to Glasshill Valley for inspiration for the competition, but once there he learns of Wyler's Elixir and thinks that it will interest Lee. Wang travels with his pet Pelican Hoeh-Hoeh.

==== Sinclair ====
Voiced by: Harumi Ikoma

Sinclair (シンクレア) is Wyler's bodyguard. Though she pretends to encourage him in his experiments, she secretly wants him to stop them. She has a flashy sword fighting style reminiscent of Indian swordsmanship.

==== Tom Wyler ====
Voiced by: Monster Maezuka

Tom Wyler (トム・ワイラー) is the final boss in Art of Fighting 3. He works on perfecting a powerful elixir that was originally developed by his father and Freia Lawrence's father. However, when their partnership fell part, Freia's father took the essential data needed to complete the elixir and left it with Freia, having realized the dangerous effects that would cause to its user. Wyler blames this action for his father becoming destitute and eventually dying, and begins seeking Freia so he can complete the elixir. Upon completing the elixir, it transforms him into a Hulk-like man. However, the after-effect of the elixir worn off when he being defeated regress his mind to his childhood self, leaving Freia to stay nursing him back to health, in hopes to reform him.

== Reception ==
HardcoreGaming criticized the characters from Art of Fighting "mediocre character designs", barely standing out in SNK's quality with few being seen as "cool". Wesley Yin-Poole of Videogamer.com commented that Ryo and Robert are "two double-hard bastards". In another article, the website criticized how the arcade mode of the first game only offers Ryo and Robert, finding ports more entertaining for making the two boss characters available there in the versus mode. This led to poor quality when compared to Fatal Fury's cast. Ryo and Robert were compared by VentureBeat to the Street Fighter protagonists Ryu and Ken Masters due to physical similarities and moves; However, their morals and bonds were praised. IGN also compared him with Dragon Ball characters based on the type of fighting techniques as well as designs. The "Haohshokohken" was better received due to the impact it had on gaming Marvel vs. Capcom series and the strategy needed. The release of Art of Fighting 2 led to more positive responses as SNK added more playable characters besides the two original leads. The interactions between the cast was praised by NintendoLife even if SNK would ditch the cinematic cutscenes. In particular, Yuri and Eiji were regarded as the most notable new creation from Art of Fighting 2. DieHardGameFan referred to the young fighter Yuri as "wonderful adorable obnoxious completely batshit ludicrous Yuri" due to how hilarious she is, making it his favorite SNK fighter as well as superior to the Dead or Alive characters he also enjoys. GameSpot said the final game had few properly written story modes with the exceptions of Ryo and Robert's stories that are given dialogues with every rival.

Tiago Oviedo Frosi wrote that Gichin Funakoshi's "Shōtōkan" is the most practiced style of Karate in the world, this was the style chosen to characterize most of the Street Fighter characters. The Kyokugenryu the main cast uses in Art of Fighting instead comes across as a fantasy version of the "knockout" Kyokushinkaikan created by Mas Oyama who serves as an influence for both Ryu's and Yuri's characters. The handling of Mr. Karate's ego by Ryo and Takuma is noted to be influenced by Shintoism, the "indigenous religion" of Japan. Among the various creatures or entities of Sgubti, one of the most important is the Tengu, a flying humanoid with two facial representations, each with its own meaning. One of these figures is known as the Tengu mountain monk, with a reddish face and a long nose. Both Ryo and Takuma wear a tengu mask when taking the name of Mr. Karate. HardcoreGaming101 compared Art of Fighting 3 and Robert's story to "a Jekyll and Hyde based on the final boss being large man with supernatural strength. Meristation noted that Art of Fighting 3 had a complete new cast of characters except Ryo and Robert predating the impact of Capcom's Street Fighter III which would do the same with options with the exception of Ryu and Ken, further exploring the rivalry between SNK and Capcom.

The characters of Ryo and Geese Howard also became famous in Fatal Fury as Art of Fighting and Fatal Fury take place in the same timeline and often connect plot events. Gabriel Keene Von Koenig from Centro Universitário de Brasília Soares notes that Ryo's inclusion in the Fatal Fury Special was iconic due to the iconic music SNK put in the game when Ryo appeared as a hidden boss. Ryo becoming a middle-aged man in Fatal Fury: Wild Ambition was noted to be more fitting to the story of by Hardcore Gaming.

In humorous retaliation, Street Fighter II co-designer Akiman drew an artwork of Street Fighter Sagat holding a defeated opponent by the head during the release of Street Fighter II: Champion Edition. The defeated opponent wore an attire similar to Ryo's: an orange karate gi with a torn black shirt underneath and geta sandals like Ryo; but had long dark hair tied to a ponytail like Robert. Polygon recalls that during the release of Street Fighter Alpha, both Capcom and SNK started a rivalry with North American joke from a Capcom magazine standing out as Ryu confuses Ryo with Ken and defeats him with all of his strength while claiming his enemy lacked originality.

By 1997, when The King of Fighters was at its peak with the Orochi story arc in The King of Fighters '97, new works in the Art of Fighting series had already stopped being released. As a result, writer Akihiko Ureshino recalls fans believing Ryo and Yuri being original KOF character. However, Ryo Sakazaki and Yuri Sakazaki are genuine characters of the Art of Fighting series, and are not the "comedians" of the KOF series. They tend to be unable to get involved in the main story and end up in comical roles, but Ryo and the others are actually more serious characters. SNK noted The King of Fighters XIV lacked characters from Art of Fighting and attempted to add Jack Turner and John Crawley. However, Yasuyuki Oda declined to do this because of their lack of popularity.
