= KOF: Maximum Impact =

2004 video game

- Japanese PlayStation 2 box art for KOF: Maximum Impact — Maniax, featuring Soiree, Alba Meira and Lien Neville
- Developer: Noise Factory
- Publishers: NA/JP: SNK Playmore; PAL: Ignition Entertainment
- Producer: Masahiro Maeda
- Programmers: Kazuaki Ezato; Hiroshi Hishikawa; Yasuhiro Kurahashi; Nobuhisa Shinoda
- Series: The King of Fighters
- Engine: RenderWare
- Platforms: PlayStation 2, Xbox
- Release: PlayStation 2: JP: August 12, 2004; NA: October 12, 2004; AU: February 10, 2005; EU: March 4, 2005; Maniax: JP: March 23, 2006; Xbox: JP: June 23, 2005; NA: June 28, 2005
- Genre: Fighting
- Modes: Single-player, multiplayer

KOF: Maximum Impact is a 2004 fighting game developed by Noise Factory and published by SNK Playmore for the PlayStation 2. An enhanced version was released in 2005 for the Xbox, subtitled Maniax. Marketed as a spin-off of SNK's major fighting series The King of Fighters (KOF), whence many of its characters originate, Maximum Impact also contains elements of the Fatal Fury and Art of Fighting series. Maximum Impact is the first 3D fighter made by SNK since 1999's Fatal Fury: Wild Ambition and Samurai Shodown: Warriors Rage. While retaining several classic characters from previous installment, SNK created a new series of protagonists designed by Falcoon and are related with the main antagonist.

While the version released in the U.S. featured an English dub that was met with much derision (with IGN's Jeremy Dunham going so far as to label it "piss poor"), further releases for the Xbox and PAL PS2 add a choice of English and Japanese language options. The Xbox version also includes an online match mode where matches could be fought between players via Xbox Live. The game was followed in 2006 by KOF: Maximum Impact 2, which was released in North America as The King of Fighters 2006. In promoting it Production I.G produced an original net animation called Another Day, while in later years SNK produced an updated version of the sequel.

== Gameplay ==
A fight between Lien Neville and Rock Howard

Unlike the 2D games from the series, Maximum Impact breaks the team system, causing all the fighters to fight alone. The story mode is experienced as a single character through the "Mephistopheles Fighting Tournament". For most characters, this consists of fighting six characters, with Duke's cronie / Consigliere Hyena announcing the next opponent between matches. For the final match, one faces Duke himself. For a few "featured" characters (Alba Meira, Soiree Meira, and Lien Neville), the story is more intricate and fleshed out.

The gameplay is similar to those of Tekken, Street Fighter and Bloody Roar series, such as having a more combo command moves system and players being capable of executing juggle combos freely.

In Versus Mode, a single match (be it a one-on-one fight or a 3 vs. 3 battle) is fought against either the computer or another player. In Mission Mode, the player is faced with four levels of ten missions each. Each mission has settings and conditions to be completed. Most of the game's unlockables come through this mode. In Time Attack Mode, the player has to defeat a number of characters as quickly as possible. The online mode is available only on the Xbox version, and features online matchmaking for play between two players.

== Plot ==
It is a spin off of the original line set 2 years after the events of N.E.S.T.S. saga in 2004, an alternate saga to the Ash.

Addis was the most powerful gang in Southtown. Its leader, a man known only as Fate, was considered a modern-day Robin Hood to the poor and downtrodden. He himself had adopted two twin brothers, Alba and Soiree Meira, and trained them to be successors to his legacy. Six months before the in-game events, Fate is killed by Duke, the leader of the up-and-coming Mephistopheles gang. Duke then proceeds to exploit the poor to serve his thirst for power.

In the present day, the "Mephistopheles Fighting Tournament" is beginning, with the venue being all of Southtown. The participants (minus the Meira Brothers and Lien) believe that the tournament is being sponsored by a charity organization known as the Metatron Foundation, but they soon learn that its true sponsor is the Mephistopheles gang. Alba, Soiree and Lien are contacted directly by Hyena, so they know Metatron has nothing to do with this.

== Characters ==
KOF: Maximum Impact has twenty playable characters. Six additional characters make their debut in this game, and most of the remaining roster is inherited from The King of Fighters series, in which only half of the roster made it into the final game. One noteworthy exception to the rule is Rock Howard, brought in from the most recent Fatal Fury chapter, Garou: Mark of the Wolves.

Each character features at least one alternative costume. Some alternate costumes are radically different from the defaults, such as Terry's Garou: Mark of the Wolves look and Clark's professional wrestler persona. In addition to the alternate costumes, characters can be modified with unlockable "rigging models," which add details to the available costumes, such as a wolf mask for Terry or a party hat and banner for Seth.

=== Newcomers ===
- Alba Meira – The star of KOF: Maximum Impact, Alba is a former soldier and prodigy of Fate, the former boss of the Southtown gangs, who enters the tournament so he can contact (and destroy) Duke to basically rule Southtown in Fate's stead.
- Soiree Meira – Alba's younger twin brother, who is more brash than his cool-headed older brother. He is determined to help Alba dispose of Duke by any means necessary. He also seems to like Chae Lim
- Chae Lim – Star pupil of Fatal Fury and The King of Fighters character Kim Kaphwan, who enters the tournament in his place
- Duke – The leader of the Mephistopheles gang that controls Southtown. Earned the nickname "Hell's Executioner" because of the prominent scar across his neck. Duke is the final boss of the game.
- Lien Neville – A buxom assassin-for-hire who currently has Duke as her client, ordered to enter the KOF tournament and dispose of any insurgency.
- Mignon Beart – A young witch-in-training who enters the tournament to test her own might and help create world peace.

=== Veterans ===
- Athena Asamiya
- Clark Still
- Iori Yagami
- K'
- Kyo Kusanagi
- Leona
- Mai Shiranui
- Maxima
- Ralf Jones
- Rock Howard
- Ryo Sakazaki
- Seth
- Terry Bogard
- Yuri Sakazaki

== Development ==
Several of the new characters from the game were designed to be the counterparts of other KOF characters. Both Meira brothers were initially conceptualized to be the counterparts to Fatal Fury stars, Terry and Andy Bogard, given the game's setting is the same as their predecessors. Falcoon adds that he was originally displeased with Alba's presentation in the first game as it didn't meet with his expectations for the character at the time. Once he was named producer for the sequel, Falcoon took extra care to make Alba present himself as he intended: the stylish and "all-mighty" character. Series scenario writer Akihiko Ureshino states that the Meira siblings became twin brothers to avoid comparison with other brother characters from other SNK games, such as the Kazama brothers from the Samurai Shodown series and the Jin brothers also from Fatal Fury. He also addresses that the main complaint received from fans were concerns of the brothers "not looking alike"; in response, Akihiko admits that he was also unaware of Alba and Soiree being siblings until much later in production and shares his confusion with fans to this day.

Lien conceptually began as a contrast to fellow KOF participant Mai Shiranui. While Mai represents a "sexy and beautiful kunoichi", Lien represents another counterpart: the "sexy Western femme fatale". Her outfits are purposely designed to be "tight and constricting" to contrast Mai's clothing, which is made to allow for easy and quick movements. To further the contrast between the two assassins, efforts were made to make Lien more serious and darker than Mai, despite being one of the heroines in the series. Similar to how Lien contrasts Mai, Mignon was designed to be the rival to Athena. Her magical powers were created to counter Athena's Psycho Powers, which is interpreted by Falcoon to be akin to witchcraft.

Originally, Kim Kaphwan was going to enter the first entry of the Maximum Impact series under the pseudonym "Mr. Taekwondo" – in the same fashion as Art of Fighting's Mr. Karate. Due to veteran designers' complaints and other difficulties at the time, it was finally decided to leave Kim out of the game's lineup but add another character like him to replace his absence. While several other characters were considered for the spot – including other SNK characters such as Jhun Hoon, May Lee, and Buriki One character Seo Yong Song – a fellow developer voiced interest in creating another female Taekwondo fighter with the same "professional" manner as Kim, which eventually formed the basis for Chae Lim. In Maximum Impact and Maximum Impact 2 Terry wears both recurring outfits which bothered Ureshino. This is mostly due to the age difference Terry and Rock has as Terry is 24 years old in Fatal Fury and The King of Fighters but 35 in Garou: Mark of the Wolves. Meanwhile, Rock is only 17 Garou: Mark of the Wolves, making the time gap in Maximum Impact not fitting. As a result, even if Rock stands next to him, they look more like brothers than stepfather in KOF. That is why Ureshino feel uncomfortable when the two of them talk in demo scenes and the like. As a result, SNK solved this discomfort by setting Maximum Impact in an alternate timeline where Geese Howard is already dead, making it nearly the Garou: Mark of the Wolves timeline.

The updated version Maniax's PS2 version was only released in Japan, and the Xbox version was not released in PAL territories.

== Reception ==
Reception

Aggregate score
| Aggregator | Score |
|---|---|
| Metacritic | (Xbox) 69/100 (PS2) 64/100 |

Review scores
| Publication | Score |
|---|---|
| GameSpot | 7.0/10 (Xbox); 6.7/10 (PS2) |
| IGN | 7.8/10 (Xbox); 7.4/10 (PS2) |

Prior to its release, KOF: Maximum Impact was a finalist from GameSpot's "Best of E3 2004" in the category Best Fighting Game. However, it lost to Mortal Kombat: Deception. Ben Herman, president from SNK Playmore USA, commented that although he received complaints about the English voices for the game, Maximum Impact sold over 100,000 units as of May 2006.

The character designs in Maximum Impact were praised by IGN, which noted that the conversion to three-dimensional modeling had "extremely vibrant" characters with "a decent amount of detail." However, they disliked the lack of blood, especially during violent attacks, saying the super moves and combos were "just not as spectacular here" as they were in previous installments. IGN sharply criticized the "terribly bad voice acting", calling it "truly piss-poor American dub work." Gamezone added that some characters still remain their unique fighting style, but complained about the lack of individualized endings, and commented that some of the attacks have less style in 3D. GameSpot also added that the English voices weren't distinctive, but commented that their new outfits were "pretty wild". The characters, however, were "just not done with the same pixel-perfect flair" as the 2D versions, they said, noting that "you'll recognize [the characters] because of their clothes and special moves, not because of their faces."
