= Leona =

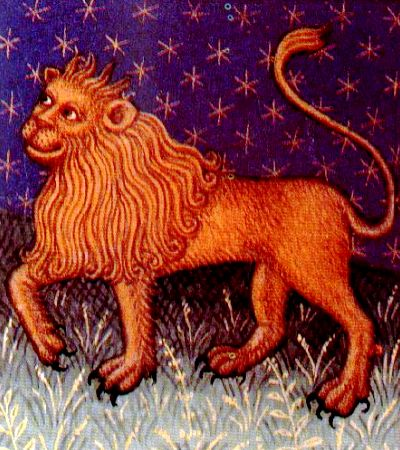

Leona is a female given name derived from the Latin word leo for "lion".

People and fictional characters named Leona include:

== People ==
- Leona (wrestler) (born 1980), Japanese professional wrestler
- Leona Aglukkaq, Canadian politician
- Leona Alleslev (born 1968), Canadian politician and military officer
- Leona Anderson (1885–1973), American actress
- Leona Brown, American boxer
- Leona Cavalli, Brazilian actress
- Leona Dalrymple, American author
- Leona Detiège (born 1942), Belgian politician
- Leona Dombrowsky, Canadian politician
- Leona Edmiston, Australian fashion designer
- Leona Florentino, Philippine poet
- Leona Gom, Canadian novelist and poet
- Leona Graham, British DJ and voiceover artist
- Leona Helmsley, American hotel operator and real estate investor
- Leona Hutton, American silent film star
- Leona Lewis (born 1985), British singer-songwriter
- Leona Lishoy (born 1991), Indian actress and model
- Leona Maguire (born 1994), Irish professional golfer
- Leona Mitchell, American soprano
- Leona Naess (born 1974), British singer-songwriter
- Leona Popović (born 1997), Croatian alpine ski racer
- Leona E. Prasse (1897–1984), American art curator
- Leona Riemann (born 1952), German writer, author, and publisher
- Leona Roberts (1879–1954), American stage and film actress
- Leona Vidal Roberts (born 1972), Falkland Islands politician
- Leona Vaughan (born 1995), Welsh actress
- Leona Vicario, Mexican, supporter of the Mexican War of Independence
- Leona Savage Osterman, American politician
- Leona Winter (born 1995), French drag queen
- Leona Woods, American physicist

== Fictional characters ==
- Leona Heidern, in The King of Fighters video game series
- Leona Ozaki, in Masamune Shirow's Dominion anime and manga series
- Leona, the Radiant Dawn, a playable champion character in the multiplayer online battle arena video game League of Legends
- Leona Lion, from the TV series Between the Lions
- Leaky Leona, a character from the third season of the TV series Codename: Kids Next Door

== See also ==
- Leona (disambiguation)
- La Leona (disambiguation)
- Reona (given name)
