= The King of Fighters: Kyo =

1998 video game

- Cover of the game
- Developers: SNK, Yumekobo
- Publisher: SNK
- Producer: Norihide Kashiwada
- Artist: Masato Matsumoto
- Series: The King of Fighters
- Platform: PlayStation
- Release: JP: August 27, 1998
- Genres: Adventure, role-playing game, visual novel
- Mode: Single-player

The King of Fighters: Kyo (Japanese: ザ・キング・オブ・ファイターズ 京, Hepburn: Za Kingu obu Faitāzu Kyo) is a 1998 adventure game developed by Yumekobo and SNK. It was released on August 27, 1998, in Japan for the Sony PlayStation console. The game is presented as an adventure game set with fights arranged in a similar fashion to turn-based role-playing games. The plot follows the titular character, Kyo Kusanagi, who prepares to participate in the next worldwide fighting tournament and learn about the origins of his lineage and his rival's, Iori Yagami. The two were originally rivals until they were cursed by the demon Yamata no Orochi. The player primarily controls Kyo Kusanagi, although several allies often side alongside him to form a team against other AI-controlled ones.

Based on Masato Natsumoto's manga of the same name, the game is a spin-off of The King of Fighters series. Unlike the manga, which was based on the end of The King of Fighters '95 and the next days of Kyo's life, this game focuses primarily on the prelude and development of The King of Fighters '97. Natsumoto is the main artist behind the cutscenes.

The game was never released outside Japan, leading to a poor legacy. It received mixed reviews. Although the story and presentation were praised for their visuals, voice acting, and expansion of Kyo's life, the gameplay was criticized for making fights confusing.

== Gameplay ==
An example of a cutscene where Kyo interacts with Yuki, Athena, and Shingo (above) and an example of a turn-based fight (below).

The player primarily controls the martial artist Kyo Kusanagi, who interacts with other fighters aiming to join The King of Fighters 1997 tournament, and it is up to the player to decide who will join him. As a visual novel, the player is often given decisions that will have major impacts in the next cutscenes. However, a constant lack of activity with the main plot can result in Iori Yagami attacking Kyo's friends and them losing interest in Kyo. If Kyo defeats Iori before he ambushes his allies, the friendship will remain intact.

As Kyo Kusanagi, the player travels across Japan, Asia, and America, solving various cases and conspiracies while searching for allies to fight alongside them in KOF'97 and aiming to win. Losing once gives an instant game over, though there are optional fights that do not affect the narrative. While the game is primarily single-player, there is a versus mode where players can fight using the unlockable characters. The player has 31 days to prepare for the main tournament. Kyo's responses to other characters can lead to change their relationships in both positive and negative way based on their personaities and answer the player chooses.

In contrast to most games, fights in The King of Fighters: Kyo take the form of a strategy role-playing game where the player primarily controls Kyo Kusanagi and, depending on which part of the story, different allies. The fights are divided into three turns where the player can gather energy needed to perform special moves and Desperation Moves. Once a character loses all of their health, a winner is decided, though not every fight requires winning to progress properly in the story. Winning multiple fights leads to Kyo leveling up, improving his stats. Additionally, when beating one of the last stories before the climax, Kyo can learn another Desperation Move besides his classic Orochinagi. If Kyo is level 10 or higher, he will be able to use Orochi in battles, and if that condition is met, all characters can be used.

== Plot ==
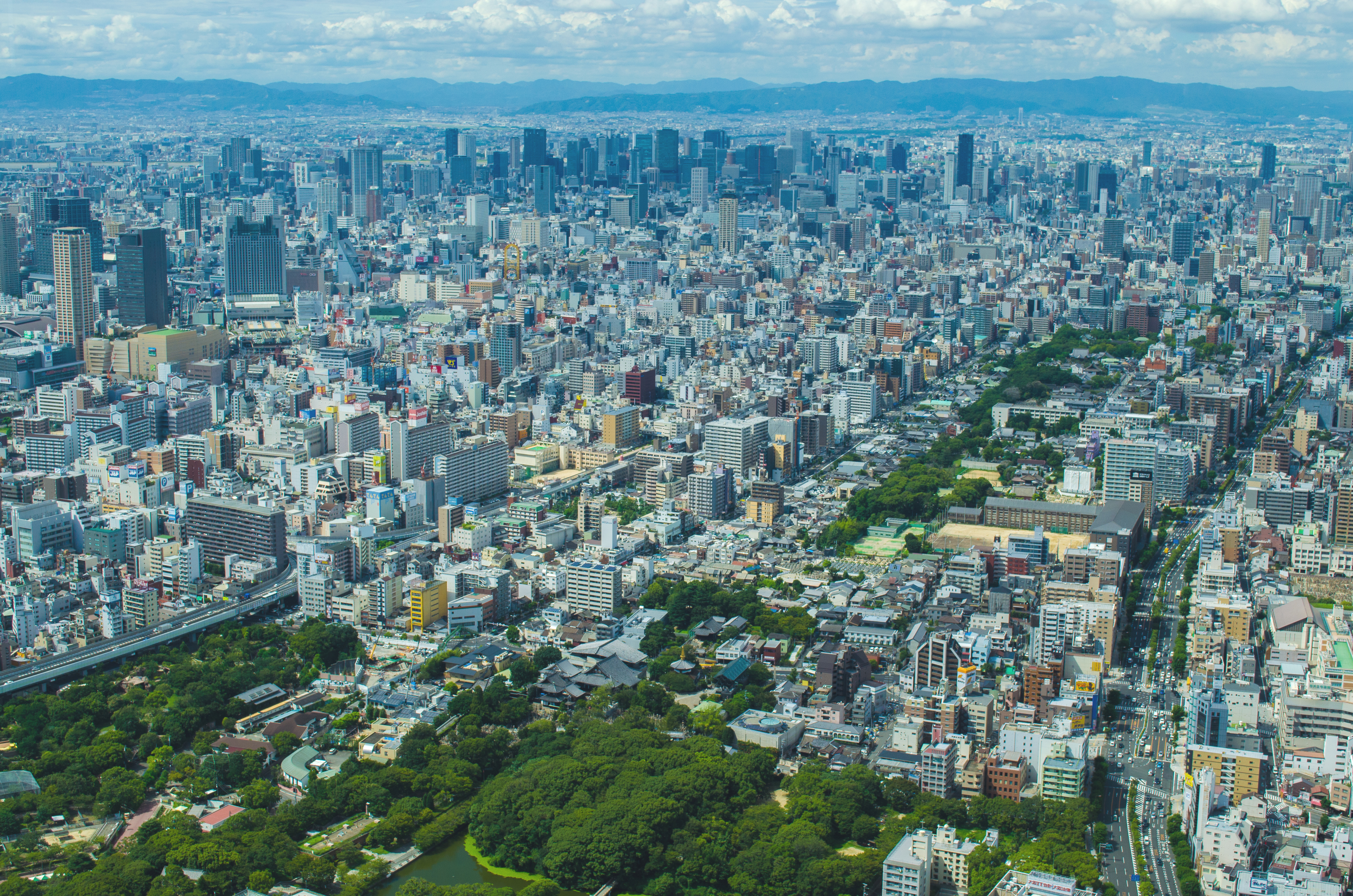
Though the player can travel around the world, the game primarily takes place in the city of Osaka, Japan.

After The King of Fighters '96, the champion Kyo Kusanagi gets tired of dealing with his rival Iori Yagami until he reveals his Riot of the Blood curse that makes the latter prepare a death match the next time they meet with Chris, Shermie, and Yashiro from the New Faces Team and Chizuru Kagura observing from afar. The story then moves to Kyo's avoidance of his school life, where he is lectured by his girlfriend Yuki and challenged by his fan Shingo Yabuki. After defeating Shingo, Kyo grants Shingo's wish of becoming his student. The two then spot Iori Yagami being bothered by Yashiro and Ryuji Yamazaki. Shortly afterwards, Kyo is attacked by three delinquents called the Tendo who want an invitation. Though they fail, Kyo's father, Saisyu, reveals that a new King of Fighters tournament is starting next month, and he has Kyo fight both him and his retired cousin Souji to make sure he remains in form for the competition.

Despite wanting to enter into the 1997 tournament, Kyo remains more interested in why Souji retired despite remembering him as the strongest Kusanagi since their childhood. As this happens, their rivals Athena Asamiya and Sie Kensou follow him alongside Yuki to learn about his clan, with Souji having actually become cursed and how the demon Yamata no Orochi will be involved in the competition. Kyo is also fated to become a demon if he keeps fighting, but he claims he will fight destiny. Shortly afterwards, Kyo discovers that Souji's younger sister, Aoi, has learned the power of Orochi and goes missing. The search for Aoi leads to the previous KOF host, Chizuru, asking Kyo to find Iori to help them defeat the Orochi despite their grudge, with Yamazaki and Yashiro threatening them. Chizuru explains to him through her Sacred Treasure, the Yata Mirror, that both Kyo's and Iori's ancestors were once allies, but the latter was cursed by Orochi. This led to the grudge between Kusanagi and Yasakani, now renamed Yagami, which would also turn Kusanagis into demons. Despite learning the truth, Souji is still against fighting. Kyo finds Aoi in a show where Shermie is revealed as the one who taught Aoi the power of Orochi. With Aoi safe, the Tendo makes peace with Kyo, claiming their antagonism was just done since they were jealous of his popularity and their smallest brother idolized him.

Kyo starts traveling around the world to meet rivals from previous tournaments, developing several side stories. When returning to Osaka, Kyo learns that Yuki has been missing and takes it upon himself to travel around the world to find her. After several searches, Kyo and Robert Garcia from the Art of Fighting Team believe the culprits are Yamazaki and Yashiro. Enraged, Kyo develops his strongest technique: the "Saihsuu Kessen Ougi: Mushiki" (最終決戦奥義・無式; lit. "Final Showdown Ultimate Technique: No Style") that nearly kills them until Chizuru tries to stop him. However, Kyo rejects his own power, as he feels there is no meaning to his power if he cannot protect Yuki in the process. Chizuru then reveals the entire kidnapping was fake, as she wanted to test Kyo's determination. Despite his relaxed state with Yuki's safety, Kyo once again is enraged when learning Chris takes Yuki. In the 1997 tournament, Chizuru claims they need ten other fighters to defeat Orochi. In the quarter, Iori's Riot of the Blood causes him to go berserk, but he is defeated by Kyo. The Orochi trio reveals Yuki is the reincarnation of the maiden Kushinadahime needed to revive Orochi. After the Orochi trio is defeated, Yuki returns safely to Kyo, but Chris's body becomes Orochi's vessel. Once Kyo defeats Orochi, Chizuru reveals Kusanagi, Yasakani, and Yata are the Sacred Treasures needed to seal the Will of Gaia with the help of ten other Treasures that the player met. With the combined efforts of the Ten Sacred Treasures, Orochi is sealed in the Yata Mirror, which can open an alternative ending where Kyo challenges Iori to a one-on-one fight.

== Development and release ==
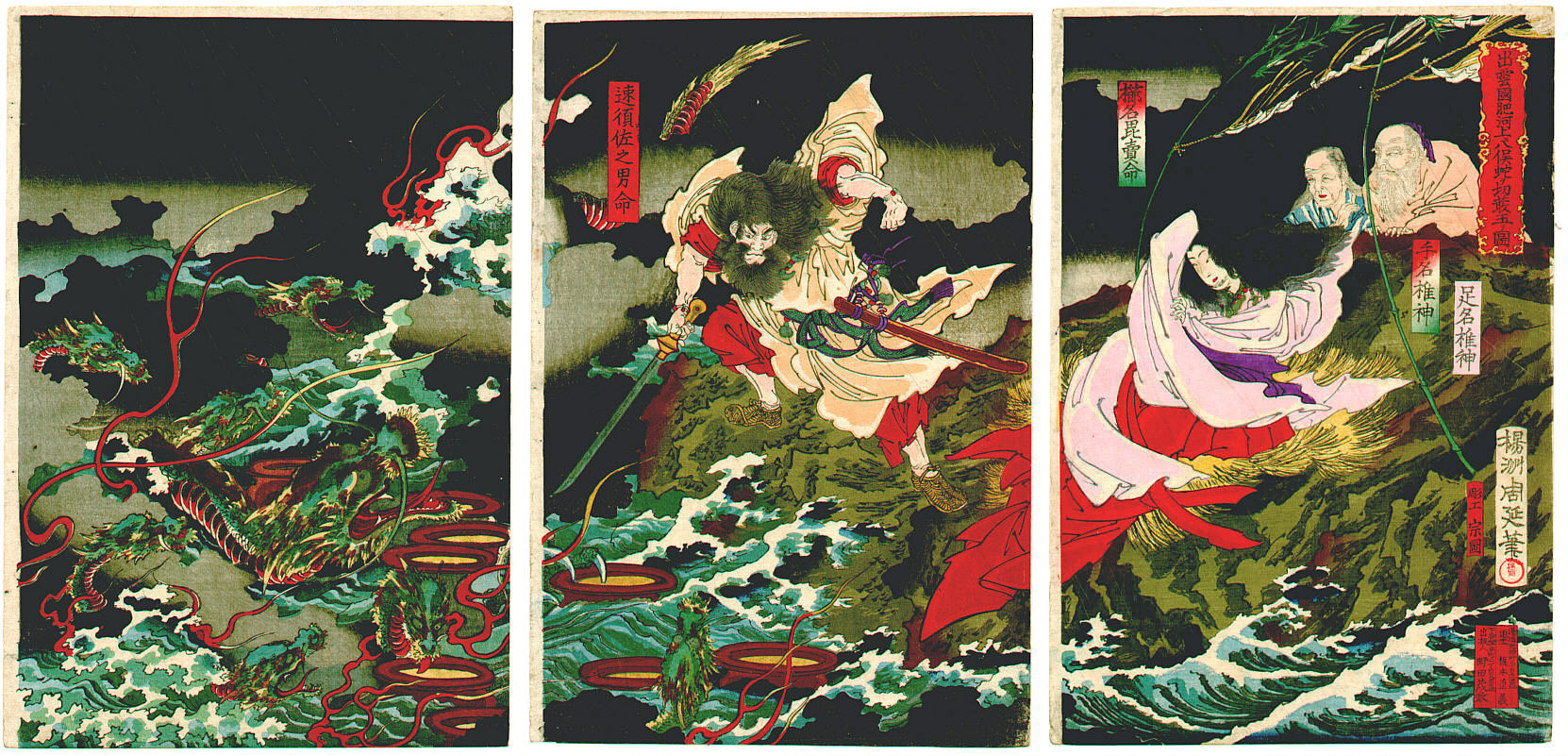
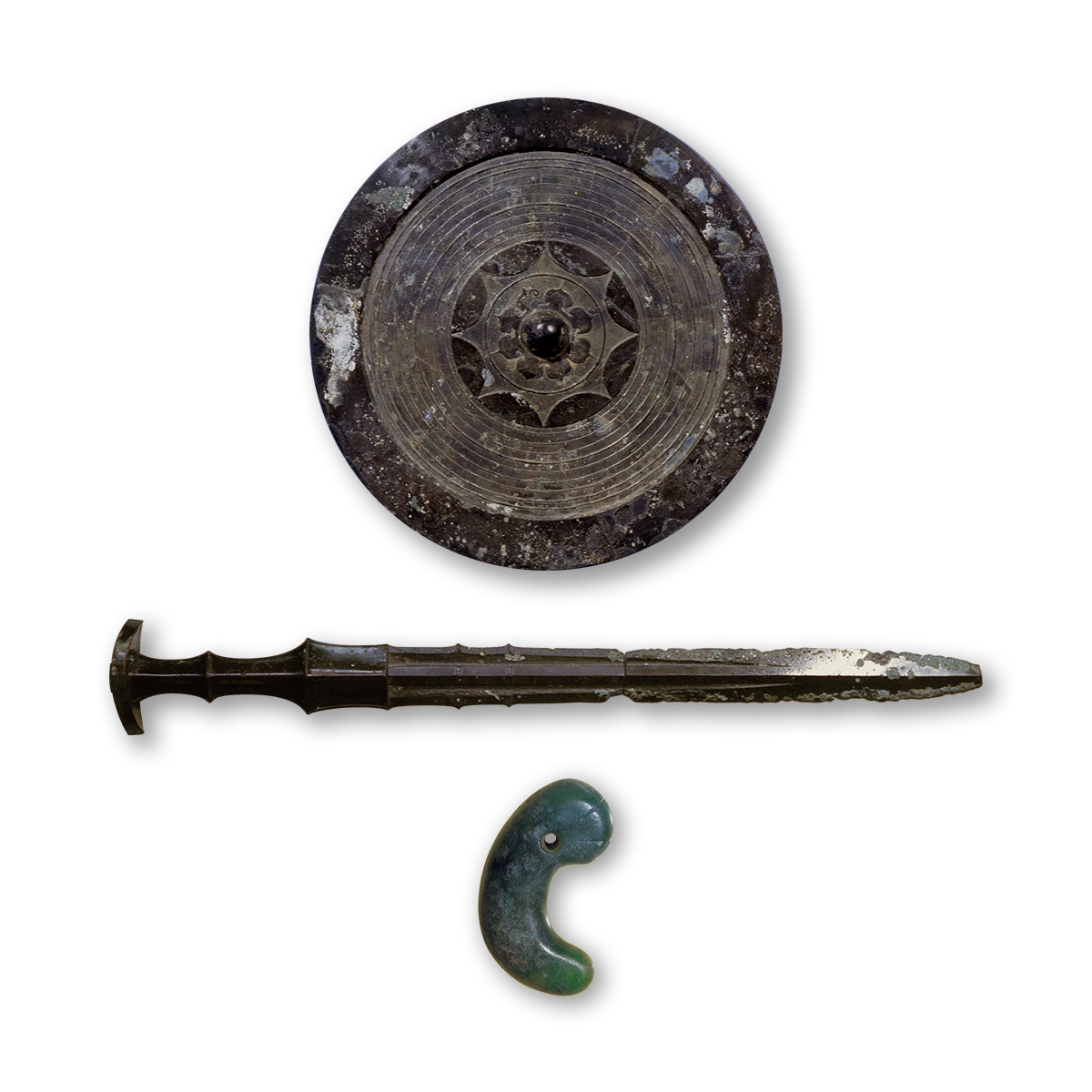
The game's narrative expanded the Orochi arc of the series by focusing on the representations of the three Imperial Regalia of Japan, the sword, the mirror, and the jewel. These are represented in the protagonist, Kyo, the rival, Iori, and Chizuru.

Among the multiple manga adaptations of The King of Fighters released in the 1990s, Masato Matsumoto's manga The King of Fighters: Kyo served as inspiration for the game's spin-off. Some events were created to add comic relief to the main story, like Kyo and Iori competing in a karaoke match where their voice actors perform songs. In contrast to Shinkiro's work from the main installments of the franchise, the artwork of this spin-off was done by Masato Matsumoto. New characters were created, including Kyo's cousins, who retired from fighting, and the Tendo delinquents, who antagonize the protagonist. The game was originally promoted in the PlayStation version of The King of Fighters '97. Similar to the lore of The King of Fighters '96 and The King of Fighters '97, the plot utlizes the Imperial Regalia of Japan as the Sacred Treasures from Kyo's, Iori's and Chizuru's predecessors in order to defeat the villain Yamata no Orochi that originates from Japanese mythology. However, the lore was extended by adding new treasures needed to help Kyo.

Concept artwork of Yuki and Kyo Kusanagi by manga artist Masato Matsumoto

All the characters from the main games reprised their roles. Kunihiko Yasui debuted as a singer with his theme "Never Lose My Way", which "was recorded during the play the other day, so in order to keep the main flow of the live performance going, I tried my best not to make any mistakes when singing it, that's all there is to it." Masahiro Nonaka came up with the scene where Yuki and Kyo dance. Nonaka was also surprised by Yamazaki's portrayal, as he noted the actor often made the character hilarious. Despite Kyo's fame, Nonaka noticed that Kyo had a more sensitive side, not only due to his romance with Yuki but also other relationships, which he said made him easy to bully. Both "Never Lose My Way" and "Pieces" were first recorded in the Neo Geo DJ Station CD. When it came to Yuki's character, Nonaka highly favored her over other SNK female characters, seeing her as a departure from other ones seen in his works.

Nonaka said that people could create their own type of Kyo as a result of having choices that influence multiple relationships to the point of befriending his rival Iori. Other actors include Tomoko Tojima as Yuki who enjoy the multiple date cutscenes her character has with Kyo which she finds refreshing in contrast to the typical fight scenes. Yasui laments not being able to interact with other actors doing the recording but still looked forward to scenes where players will find his portrayal surprising. Takehito Koyasu voices Shingo Yabuki, portraying him as a comic relief among the serious narrative. Meanwhile, Akiko Saito plays Chizuru Kagura in a calm fashion that she found hard to deliver proper emotions.

Though Nonaka had experience with the original The King of Fighters: Kyo manga, he felt recording was a struggle due to it being the first time he worked for a new game that was not about fighting. Nonaka elaborated that he was given several more lines to record than usual as a result of the game's content and Kyo being the lead. Still, he particularly liked Kyo's family relationships explored in the narrative in a similar fashion to how he was portrayed in Matsumoto's manga and thus looked forward to its portrayal in the new video game. The game was released in Japan on August 27, 1998. The soundtrack, composed of two disks, was released on September 18, 1998, by Pony Canyon.

== Reception ==
Reception

Review scores
Publication	Score
Dengeki PlayStation	70/100, 65/100
Gamers	3.8/5

Critical response to the game was mixed based on narrative and gameplay. Brazilian magazine Gamers praised the game, giving it a 3.8 out of 5, noting the battles are simple and fun with a captivating storyline, while as a minus, they note the music consists of simple arrangements of previous songs from the series. Hardcore Gaming 101 writer Kurt Kalata found the gameplay confusing due to the lack of instructions and criticized the lack of actions done by its heroine, Kyo's girlfriend Yuki. While Kyo and Iori were known as fellow rivals, the latter was criticized for how he stalks characters who are friendly with the player. While the presentation was generally praised for including voice acting and proper focus on Kyo's life, the artwork was criticized by Kulata for having an "amateurish doujin quality". Hobby Consolas found the amount of 40 playable characters in the versus mode appealing but claimed fans would be bothered by trying to understand the fighting engine, as they need to figure out each character's speed before performing special moves.

Dengeki PlayStation writers said it is interesting that the players' actions determine which members will participate in the tournament. However, he was a little bothered by the fact that even when Kyo moves to a different location, the supporting cast or recruitable do not make much progress. Also, while the command selection battle scenes can be fun, fights are very long and the player mostly uses Kyo besides some allies he meets in the story. Another writer from the same magazine said guidelines for progressing through the story, so actions often end up being a waste of time, making it a bit difficult to get into. However, the characters are appealing enough to make up for that, and the reviewer personally enjoyed it, still lamenting it would only appeal to fans. The command-selection fighting section also was critcized there, making the game quite uneven in its development.

Gamers' Republic, however, was highly critical of the game, calling the combat dull and recommending it only to those who can read Japanese and are diehard fans of the series. Bonus Magazine lamented the game was only in Japanese, making only experts able to understand it. While praising the game for expanding narrative in the form of Kyo's personal life, Bonus Magazine said the player has to be careful with the actions done in every fight as the game demands careful precision to perform special techniques as well has have enough energy for them. He also said it is important to care for fellow characters in order to create a good team for the final tournament of the Orochi arc.

Loading Extra acclaimed the narrative for having one of the most emotional moments outside fighting when Kyo goes on a quest to find the missing Yuki and fights her kidnappers enraged to recover her. This is further reflected by Kyo's mastering of the Mu Shiki technique when looking for Yuki which makes Saisyu call Kyo the true Kusanagi head for the first time. This expands his son's notable character arc as the lazy protagonist decides to use his powers to protect others, leading to the adaptation of The King of Fighters '97 where Kyo takes his predecessor's place to seal the Yamata no Orochi dmeon. Outside Kyo's arc and his role in the tournament, the game was praised for further expanding Kyo's rivalry with Iori as they not only tend to fight in street fights but also in a karaoke where the two character's voice actors perform theme songs. Iori's antagonistic relationship with Kyo also stands out to the players for making them protect their allies from the rival in order to retain the party memebers for the tournament's moments.

=== Legacy ===
Time Extension praised the game for exploring more of the protagonist's social life, including his family and girlfriend, but did not find the gameplay compelling or unique despite its departure from the originals. The site also said only Japanese-speaking players would understand the game, as it was never released in Western regions, and also noticed that some people tried creating Spanish subtitles.

Conexion Manga praised the performance of Kunihiko Yasui with "Never Lose My Way" and Masahiro Nonaka's "Pieces" believing they were well executed and hoped that thanks to such works, SNK would ever create an anime based on The King of Fighters especially since SNK experimented with a The King of Fighters animation with the Dreamcast port of The King of Fighters '98 close.

TheGamer placed it on a list of fighting game spin-offs that are not known by the gamer community due to SNK and Yumekobo never releasing it outside Japan and found the visual novel and RPG elements make the installment "strange and disorienting". Kakuyomu found it nostalgic since SNK changed their voice actors since The King of Fighters XIV, and Kyo's and Iori's former voice actors work a lot in the game. However, the website criticized the need to charge energy to use not only Desperation Moves but also common special moves. Novelist Akihiko Ureshino lamented that the concept of the Ten Sacred Treasures mentioned in the tournament was not explored in the game, which would instead be seen in the spin-offs The King of Fighters EX: Neo Blood and The King of Fighters EX2: Howling Blood as new allies to Kyo's quest to stop the revival of Orochi and its followers.
