= Leona (disambiguation) =

Leona is a feminine given name.

Leona may also refer to:

== Places in the United States ==
- Leona, Kansas, a city
- Leona, Texas, a city
- Leona Creek, a stream in Texas

== Arts and entertainment ==
- Leona (film), a 2018 Mexican film
- Leona (instrument), a Mexican stringed instrument
- "Leona" (song), by Sawyer Brown, 1984
- "Leona", a song by Millencolin from Same Old Tunes (Tiny Tunes)

== Other uses ==
- Leona (skipper), a butterfly genus
- Leona (sternwheeler), an American steamship in service 1899–1912
- 319 Leona, an asteroid
- Rosemary Leona, Vanuatuan businesswoman

== See also ==
- Jacopo da Leona (died 1277), Italian poet
- Leona Valley AVA, a wine region in Los Angeles County, California
