= The King of Fighters EX: Neo Blood =

2002 video game

- Cover featuring Kyo Kusanagi in the foreground and Iori Yagami in the background
- Developers: Playmore, Artoon
- Publisher: Sammy
- Series: The King of Fighters
- Platform: Game Boy Advance
- Release: JP: January 1, 2002; EU: August 23, 2002; NA: 2002
- Genre: Fighting
- Modes: Single-player, multiplayer

The King of Fighters EX: Neo Blood (Note: Japanese: ザ・キング・オブ・ファイターズEXネオブラッド) (or KOF EX) is a fighting game developed by Playmore and Artoon in 2002 for Nintendo's Game Boy Advance. Despite being based on The King of Fighters '99 in terms of systems and design, the game features different playable characters with an original storyline involving Kyo Kusanagi and his friends being the protagonist of a new "King of Fighters" tournament set by crimelord Geese Howard. The game offers several returning characters with Kyo's ally Moe Habana being a new character.

Despite SNK going bankrupt, there were no issues with the development of the game, with Marvelous Entertainment developing it. The game received positive response by critics for its controls and cast and was followed by a sequel titled The King of Fighters EX2: Howling Blood in 2003.

== Development ==
The game's data is based on the 1999 arcade 2D fighting game The King of Fighters '99 but rather than focusing on its NESTS narrative, SNK chose to expand the previous Orochi's arc primarily focusing on Kyo Kusanagi. The protagonist's spin-off game The King of Fighters: Kyo explored more lore behind his clan and writer Akihiko Ureshino lamented that the concept of the Ten Sacred Treasures mentioned in the tournament was not explored in the game. This instead be the lore being explored in the spin-offs as new allies to Kyo's quest to stop the revival of Orochi and its followers.

The game was released on January 1, 2002 in Japan, and August 23, 2002 in Western regions by Sammy Corporation and Majesco. According to Marvelous Entertainment, the team tried tried properly adapting the original arcade controls into the Game Boy Advance ones.

The game was first announced in June 2001 with developers announcing it was 30 percent complete and that it would feature over 20 characters. Although SNK went bankpruft during, development, Neo Blood was handled by Marvelous Entertainment without issues. Since SNK went bankrupt in April 2001, EX was a difficult time for both the old SNK and the new company Playmore. On the verge of bankruptcy, who at the time had a strong impression of being a character game maker that borrowed content from other companies, to develop a spin-off work of KOF that was not a simple port. While Akihiko Ureshino still excited, when the main visual of the new character was presented to him, which was no longer even a rough draft, but was already solid.

== Gameplay and characters ==
Example of a fight between Kyo Kusanagi and Mai Shiranui.

The game's data is based on the 1999 arcade 2D fighting game The King of Fighters '99 but rather than focusing on its NESTS narrative, it focuses on the Orochi characters. Like The King of Fighters 99, the game is a fighting game where teams composed of four members fight against each other through combos and special moves and have to defeat the entire team to progress to the next stage. The counter and armor modes help to protect the player from major damage and create a major counterattack. The fourth team member is primarily used as an assistant dubbed Striker. The story focuses on the crimelord Geese Howard who wishes to take the power of the demon Yamata no Orochi by manipulating its cursed fighter Iori Yagami, leading to Kyo and other teams to oppose them. Besides the story mode, the game offers single play mode and survival mode. The playable characters are:

Hero Team
- Kyo Kusanagi
- Moe Habana
- Benimaru Nikaido
- Shingo Yabuki (striker)

Fatal Fury Team

- Terry Bogard
- Andy Bogard
- Mai Shiranui
- Joe Higashi (striker)

Ikari Team

- Leona
- Ralf Jones
- Clark Still
- Whip (striker)

Art of Fighting Team

- Ryo Sakazaki
- Robert Garcia
- King
- Yuri Sakazaki (striker)

Psycho Soldier Team

- Athena Asamiya
- Sie Kensou
- Bao
- Chin Gentsai (striker)

Korea Team

- Kim Kaphwan
- Chang Koehan
- Choi Bounge
- Jhun Hoon (striker)

=== Bosses ===
- Iori Yagami

- Geese Howard

=== Unlockable characters ===
- Iori Yagami
- Geese Howard

Strikers:

- K'
- Maxima
- Vanessa
- Ryuji Yamazaki

== Reception ==
Reception

Aggregate score
Aggregator	Score
Metacritic	80/100

Review scores
Publication	Score
GameSpy	85/100
GameZone	8.7/10
IGN	8/10
Pocket Gamer	80/100

Critical response to the game was "generally favorable" according to video game website Metacritic. GameZone considered the game a "musthave" for gamers due to its depth in gameplay and 18 playable characters but criticized its narrative, considering it as generic as Tekken games. IGN praised its visual for being nearly as good as an arcade game and had mixed issues considering how the controls from the NeoGeo adapt to the GameBoy Advance. GameSpy said that while Striker system is not unique, SNK properly executed them into the game. Andres Rojas from Nintendo World Report said compared the gameplay with Marvel vs. Capcom and The King of Fighters '99 but mentioned it is benefitted by featuring an original story not featured in previous installments as it takes before the NESTS arc. Despite issues with the presentation Nintendo GamerWeb claimed that Marvelous and Sammy did a good work in the gameplay, making it feel as good as the main series thanks to its "smooth controls". The game was compared to Mortal Kombat Advance by Pocket Gamez and Guilty Gear X by Nintendo Power due to its level of appeal.

== Sequel ==
A sequel, The King of Fighters EX2: Howling Blood, was announced for a 2003 release in the same console and later for a N-Gage under the title of The King of Fighters Extreme.
