= La Leona =

La Leona may refer to:

- Parque La Leona, a park in Honduras
- La Leona River, a river in Argentina
- La Leona (film), a 1964 Argentine film
- La Leona (Argentine TV series), an Argentine telenovela that aired in 2016
- La Leona (Mexican TV series), a telenovela that aired in 1961
- La Leona, Texas, a small settlement in Texas, USA
