= The King of Fighters EX2: Howling Blood =

2003 video game

- Cover of The King of Fighters EX2: Howling Blood featuring Kyo Kusanagi
- Developers: Marvelous Entertainment (GBA); Hudson Soft (Extreme)
- Publisher: Atlus
- Series: The King of Fighters
- Platforms: Game Boy Advance; N-Gage
- Release: Game Boy Advance; January 1, 2003 (Japan); December 11, 2003 (North America); N-Gage; January 31, 2005
- Genre: Fighting
- Modes: Single-player, multiplayer

The King of Fighters EX 2 Howling Blood (KOF EX 2) is a fighting game developed by Marvelous Entertainment for Nintendo's Game Boy Advance. It is a spin-off of SNK's The King of Fighters series and acts as a sequel to The King of Fighters EX: Neo Blood. Despite taking graphics, characters and audio from The King of Fighters 2000, the game features an original storyline that focuses on Kyo Kusanagi and his allies in stopping the revival of the demon Yamata no Orochi from Heavenly Kings. It was announced for a 2003 release in the same console. The game was also ported to the N-Gage under the name The King of Fighters Extreme. Hudson Soft developed the game, and it was published by Nokia in Europe.

Critical response to The King of Fighters EX2: Howling Blood and Extreme has been generally positive as a result of its accessible and improved content over Neo Blood. However, critics still found issues with the presentation and lack of innovation.

== Features ==
The game is modelled after The King of Fighters 2000 but without the NESTS narrative and instead focuses on the Orochi arc. It was developed by Marvelous Entertainment. Atlus published the game in Western regions. Similar to most The King of Fighters titles, the game fights using special moves and combos to defeat the enemies. The player uses team of three members to defeat the opponent's teams. The player is also assisted by supporting "Strikers" to defeat the enemies. For the Extreme version, defeating the final boss requires using only one character.

=== Plot and characters ===
Set after the events of The King of Fighters EX: Neo Blood, a new tournament is formed with the host being one of Orochi's assistant, Sinobu Amou, who wishes to revive Goenitz. Kyo Kusanagi and the rest of the Sacred Treasures Teams in charge of sealing Orochi in The King of Fighters '97 participate in the tournament to stop Goenitz's revival. The game features 21 playable characters, an arcade mode, a story mode, a single player and two player mode.

The cast includes:

Hero Team

- Kyo Kusanagi
- Moe Habana
- Reiji Oogami

Fatal Fury Team

- Terry Bogard
- Andy Bogard
- Mai Shiranui

Art of Fighting Team

- Ryo Sakazaki
- Yuri Sakazaki
- Takuma Sakazaki

Ikari Warriors Team

- Leona Heidern
- Ralf Jones
- Chark Still

Psycho Soldiers Team

- Athena Asamiya
- Sie Kensou
- Bao

Korea Team

- Kim Kaphwan
- Chang Koehan
- Choi Bounge

Yagami Team

- Iori Yagami
- Miu Kurosaki
- Jun Kagami

Boss

- Sinobu Amou

== Reception ==
Reception

Aggregate score
Aggregator	Score
Metacritic	80/100

Review scores
Publication	Score
GameSpy	85/100; 4/5 (Extreme)
GameZone	8.4/10
IGN	8/10; 7.2/10 (Extreme)
JeuxVideo	14/20 (Extreme)
MeriStation	8/10 (Extreme)
GameInformer	7.75/10

Critical response to the game was "Generally Favorable" according to video game website Metacritic. GameSpy found an improvement in regards to its visuals and characters' models. As a result, the reviewer recommended it to every The King of Fighter fan. IGN gave an 8, finding it as a major improvement over the first EX game citing more responsive controls. GameZone said the game would appeal to fighting gamers fans in general but noticed its tendency on button smashing despite its fastpaced combat. GameSpot gave it an 8.5 out of 10 for standing up to The King of Fighters's reputation in handheld consoles, praising its presentation and the amount of dialogue but still criticized its poor audio. The King of Fighters EX2: Howling Blood the best Game Boy Advance game of January 2004 by GameSpot. Despite noting its exclusive characters and improved controls, GameInformer saw Howling Blood as a port of The King of Fighters 2001 and thus lacks proper innovations.

GameSpot also praised Extreme for being identical to Howling Blood but criticized bugs and while finding it nearly identical to EX, it was still improved in terms of control. IGN scored it a 7.2 out of 10 for expanding the audience with this port with its deep control but noticed it suffered frame-rate issues and expressed mixed issues in regards to the presentation. MeriStation gave it an 8 out of 10, praising its large content, its gameplay and retaining all of the famous characters the series is known for. GameSpy gave positive comments to the controls for being easy to follow and still perform as many special moves as in the original games while still acknowledging there are issues when compared to other games. Jeuxvideo said the to the fighters' lamentable animations make the fights slow and that the franchise deserved better treatment when being released on N-Gage.
