= Masahiro Nonaka =

Japanese voice actor (born 1968)

- Born: October 15, 1968 (age 57); Hiroshima, Japan
- Occupation: voice actor
- Years active: 1994–present

Masahiro Nonaka (野中 政宏, Nonaka Masahiro; born on October 15, 1968, in Hiroshima, Japan) is a Japanese voice actor affiliated with Vozator Voice Production. Nonaka has been excessively famous for his role as Kyo Kusanagi, as well as the two Kyo clones, Kyo-1 and Kyo-2, in The King of Fighters fighting game series. Nonaka is also did the voice of another SNK character, Basara in the Samurai Shodown series.

Nonaka has made several event appearances in Japan, including live Neo Geo DJ Station concerts and promotional appearances for various SNK games. He has also appeared on the previously aired Japanese radio show Game Dra Night, hosted by Kyōko Hikami and Takehito Koyasu (coincidentally, Koyasu is the voice of Kyo's student, Shingo Yabuki, in The King of Fighters series). As Kyo, he also participates as a member of SNK's character image band, Band of Fighters.

== Filmography ==
=== Anime ===
- The King of Fighters: Another Day (2006) – Kyo Kusanagi (ep. 4)

=== Video games ===
- The King of Fighters '94 (1994) – Kyo Kusanagi
- The King of Fighters '95 (1995) – Kyo Kusanagi
- Samurai Shodown III (1995) – Basara
- The King of Fighters '96 (1996) – Kyo Kusanagi
- Samurai Shodown IV (1996) – Basara Kubikiri
- The King of Fighters '96 Neo-Geo Collection (1997) – Kyo Kusanagi, Himself
- The King of Fighters '97 (1997) – Kyo Kusanagi
- The King of Fighters '98 (1997) – Kyo Kusanagi
- The King of Fighters: Kyo (1998) – Kyo Kusanagi
- The King of Fighters '99 (1999) – Kyo Kusanagi, Kyo-1, Kyo-2
- The King of Fighters 2000 (2000) – Kyo Kusanagi
- Capcom vs. SNK: Millennium Fight 2000 (2000) – Kyo Kusanagi
- Capcom vs. SNK 2 (2001) – Kyo Kusanagi
- The King of Fighters 2001 (2001) – Kyo Kusanagi
- The King of Fighters EX: Neo Blood (2002) – Kyo Kusanagi
- The King of Fighters 2002 (2002) – Kyo Kusanagi
- SNK vs. Capcom: SVC Chaos (2003) – Kyo Kusanagi
- Samurai Shodown V (2003) – Basara Kubikiri
- The King of Fighters EX2: Howling Blood (2003) – Kyo Kusanagi
- The King of Fighters 2003 (2003) – Kyo Kusanagi
- Samurai Shodown V Special (2004) – Basara Kubikiri
- The King of Fighters: Maximum Impact (2004) – Kyo Kusanagi
- The King of Fighters Neowave (2005) – Kyo Kusanagi
- NeoGeo Battle Coliseum (2005) – Kyo Kusanagi
- The King of Fighters XI (2005) – Kyo Kusanagi, EX Kyo Kusanagi
- KOF: Maximum Impact 2 (2006) – Kyo Kusanagi, Kyo Kusanagi Classic
- The King of Fighters XII (2009) – Kyo Kusanagi
- KOF Sky Stage (2010) – Kyo Kusanagi
- The King of Fighters XIII (2010) – Kyo Kusanagi, NESTS Kyo
- Neo Geo Heroes: Ultimate Shooting (2010) – Kyo Kusanagi

== CD ==
=== Albums ===
- Neo Geo Guys Vocal Collection
- SNK Character Sounds Collection Volume 1 ~ Kyo Kusanagi
- Neo Geo DJ Station
- Neo Geo DJ Station Special
- Neo Geo DJ Station Live '98
- Neo Geo DJ Station in Neo Chupi
- Neo Geo DJ Station 2 ~BOF Returns~
- Neo Geo DJ Station Live '99
- Neo Geo DJ Station in Gemodura Night!
- The King of Fighters '96 Drama CD
- The King of Fighters '97 Drama CD (Collision Chapter)
- The King of Fighters '97 Drama CD (Destiny Chapter)
- The King of Fighters '98: The Dream Match Never Ends Drama CD
- The King of Fighters '99 Drama CD
- The King of Fighters '00 Drama CD
- KOF: Mid Summer Struggle

=== Soundtracks ===
- The King of Fighters '96 Arranged Soundtrack (as Kyo Kusanagi)
