= Kyo Kusanagi =

Fictional character

- The King of Fighters character
- Kyo Kusanagi in his original design by Eisuke Ogura
- First game: The King of Fighters '94 (1994)
- Created by: Yuichiro Hiraki, Masanori Kuwasashi
- Designed by: Extend: Shinichi Morioka (Orochi games); styleos (NESTS games); Reiko Masuyama (KOF 2003-KOFXI; Falcoon (Maximum Impact 2); Eisuke Ogura (KOFXII-KOFXIII); Nobuyuki Kuroki (KOFXIV); Tomohiro Nakata (KOFXV)
- Portrayed by: Sean Faris (2010 film); Yuichi Nakamura (KOF All Star promo trailer)
- Voiced by: Japanese: Masahiro Nonaka (KOF '94 - Neo Geo Heroes: Ultimate Shooting); Tomoaki Maeno (KOF XIV - onwards); Ryōtarō Okiayu (CD Drama); Tomokazu Sugita (Japanese dub of KOF movie)

In-universe information
- Fighting style: Kusanagi Style of Ancient Martial Arts mixed with kenpo
- Origin: Japan
- Nationality: Japanese

Kyo Kusanagi (Japanese: 草薙 京, Hepburn: Kusanagi Kyō) is a character and the protagonist of SNK's The King of Fighters series of fighting video games. The character was first introduced in the 1994 video game The King of Fighters '94 as the leader of the Japan team from the series' title tournament. A school delinquent, Kyo is the head to the Kusanagi clan who wield pyrokinetic powers. His clan is one of three who banished the legendary snake demon entity Yamata no Orochi, forming a rivalry with the cursed Iori Yagami, the successor of Kusanagi's ally turned into enemy. Besides reprising his role in printed adaptations, Kyo's personal life is explored in Yumekobo's game The King of Fighters: Kyo which deals with his personal life where his girlfriend Yuki is revealed to be predecessor of an ancient maiden the Kusanagi saved from Orochi in the ancient times.

Inspired by the boxing character Joe Yabuki from Ashita no Joe, Kyo was created by Yuichiro Hiraki after director Masanori Kuwasashi had the approval from producer Takashi Nishiyama to create the original character rivals guests from Fatal Fury, Art of Fighting among other SNK games in The King of Fighters '94. He was also given a character arc to contrast new protagonists introduced in later story arcs. Shinichi Morioka designed Kyo to make him look stylish and realistic with his high school uniform whereas styleos among other artists gave him more casual outfits starting with The King of Fighters '99. Besides redesigns, Kyo's gameplay also changed from standard fighting character that relies on distance to hand-to-hand combat. The change of design and gameplay led to creation of clone character explored in the NESTS arc involving the terrorist organization who creates an army of Kyo clones.

Video game journalists have praised Kyo's design and fighting style as among the best of the series and in fighting games in general. His constant changes of designs and moves were praised and has stood out as one of the protagonists from the series with the exception of The King of Fighters XIV. Kyo's role in the story has been praised for his heroic portrayal while facing villains, while also forming relationships with other characters, most notably Iori Yagami as both rival and ally, standing out even after finishing in his arc.

== Conception and creation ==
=== Origin and influences ===
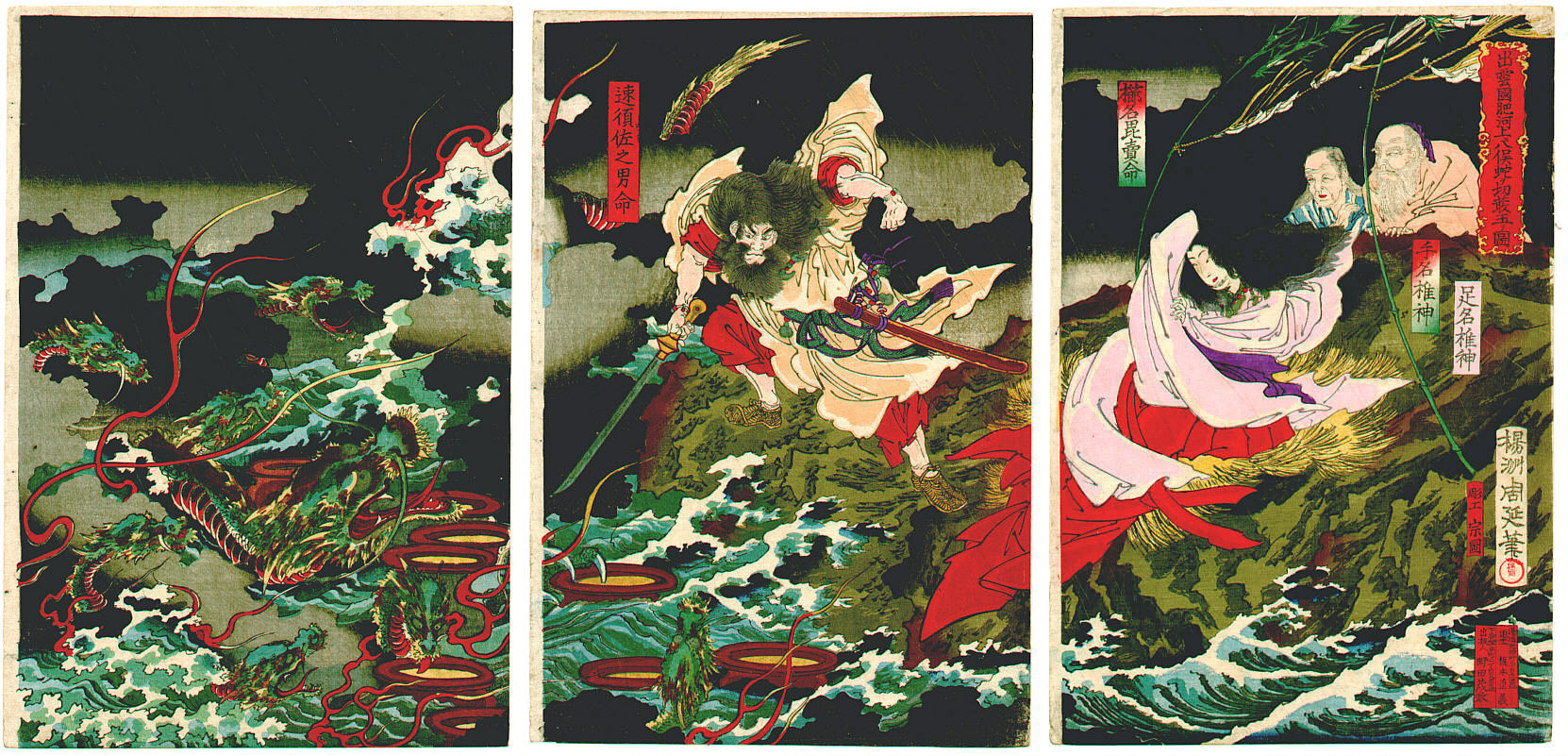
The myths of Susanoo slaying the Yamata no Orochi influenced Kyo's story arc.

In the making of the game The King of Fighters '94, director Masanori Kuwasashi expressed pressure about creating a new protagonist of the fighting game containing multiple SNK IPs. He consulted producer Takashi Nishiyama who thought it would be beneficial for sales. Another planned name before Syo was Ryo Fang (霧島翔, Fang Ryo). In the end, SNK chose the name Kyo as they felt it was more fitting. While Kyo's girlfriend Yuki was also created by Morioka out of jealousy, Kuwasashi was against using her in a romantic scene, believing it would not fit the narrative.

Kyo is as a 19-year-old teenager who passes a year in high school in The King of Fighters '95. Unlike Art of Fighting and Fatal Fury, time in The King of Fighters never passes, resulting in Kyo always repeating a grade due to insufficient attendance during the Orochi arc. While in charge of writing the character, Hiraki sought to contrast Kyo with Street Fighter lead Ryu, as he believed the latter was a popular character in international markets, and that Kyo's characterization and design could benefit from appealing to as broad of a demographic as possible. In contrast to Terry and Ryo, Kyo was given a normal life in his debut. However, the death of his father Saisyu at the hands of Rugal Bernstein was executed to make him more tragic and serious when it came to his training, leaving Japan in his ending to become stronger in future battles.

Throughout most of his development, Kyo was named Syo Kirishima (霧島 翔, Kirishima Shō) and was dressed in martial arts clothing common to fighting games of the time. The last name Kusanagi was intended as connecting point between the character and the Yamata no Orochi legend, which was the basis of the story arc of the series. The name Syo would later be used for Kyo's Another Striker in The King of Fighters 2000. Director Masanori Kuwasashi was responsible for the Orochi arc and handled how Kyo's traits are addressed in the narrative. The inclusion of the rival Iori Yagami and the revived Saisyu in The King of Fighters '95 were meant to give Kyo a more coherent story because the first game was written as a more all-star game. According to game designer Eisuke Ogura, the rivalry between Kyo and Iori still allows space for respect for each other and makes their team-ups with fellow Sacred Treasure Team member Chizuru Kagura to defeat a common enemy feel natural. Chizuru was created as means to expand the Orochi arc and bring Kyo and Iori together as the "Three Sacred Treasures Team", which represents the three Imperial Regalia of Japan.

=== Characterization and voice actors ===
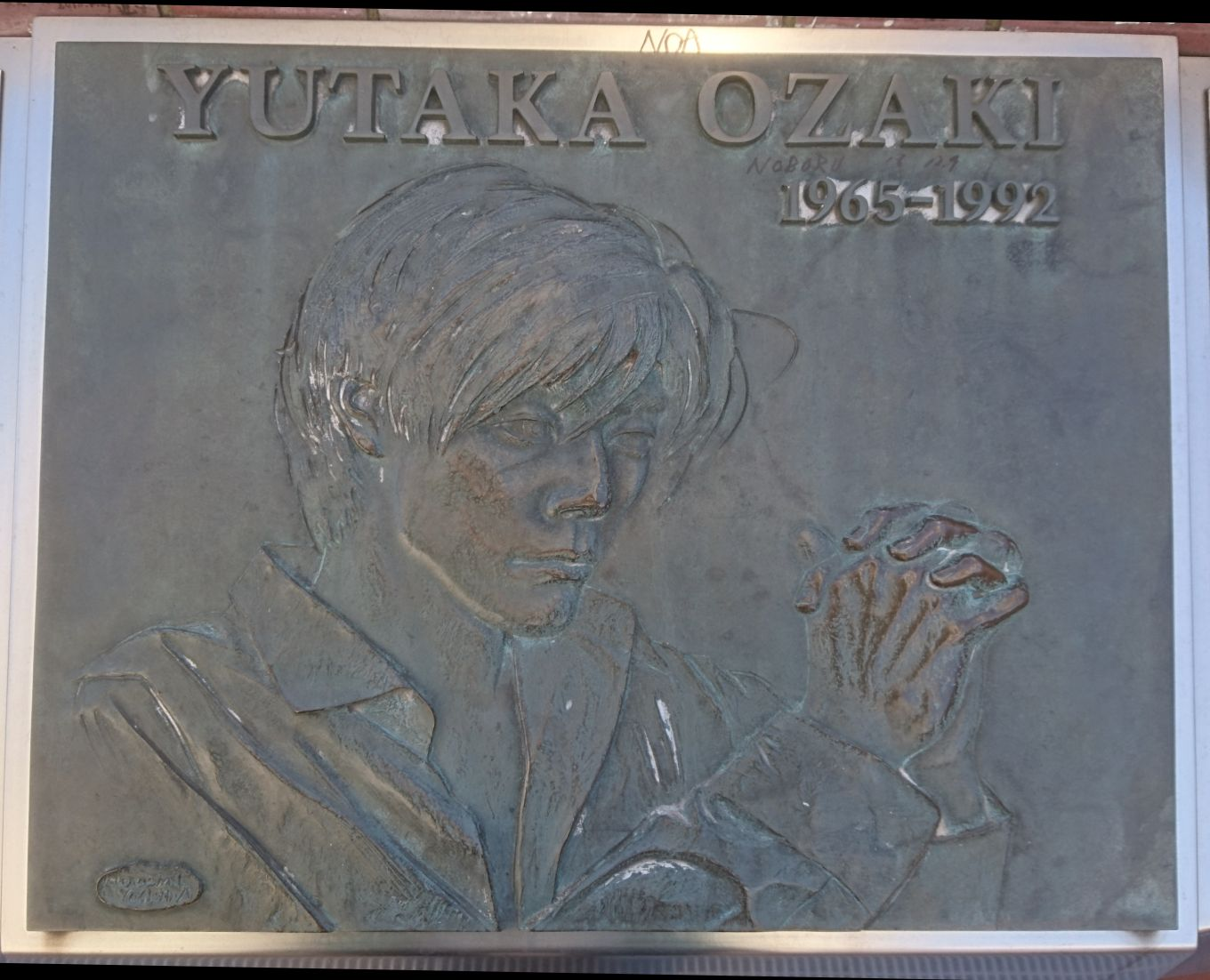
Voice actor Masashiro was influenced by the late singer Yutaka Ozaki (pictured) to portray Kyo in his early appearances.

When it came to his personality, Kyo's creator Yuichiro Hiraki was inspired by Joe Yabuki from the boxing manga Ashita no Joe as he believed hotheaded fighters like Joe were popular and it would be a major contrast to the famous Street Fighter character Ryu in terms of how they see each other's need of fighting. In his introduction, Kyo debuted as a slightly hot-blooded and somewhat egocentric character. Artist Shinkiro often drew Kyo fellow character Heidern in a intimidating fashion to symbolize their vendettas with Rugal Bernstein as both want to avenge other important relatives. In future installments, Kyo undergoes maturity that make him act more calm in comparison. By The King of Fighters XV, Ureshino refers to Kyo and Shun'ei as the most mature protagonists in KOF history, which makes their interactions feel natural, especially because the former is looking after his successors.

While Kyo and Benimaru's relationship was initially that of rivals, it eventually became like that of siblings, with Benimaru acting as the older one as he was heavily overshadowed by Iori. The romance between Kyo and Yuki remains stable across the franchise according to the novelist. Ureshino noted The King of Fighters '99 added a subtext of happiness of the two rivals meeting again, believing they had died when fighting Orochi and later would fight out of boredom. However, Ureshino does not see the idea of Iori developing his social skills as it would ruin the appeal he has with Kyo as well as the charm he has on his own.

Kyo's Japanese voice actor Masahiro Nonaka was first called to work in The King of Fighters '94 after meeting sound designer Yasumasa Yamada. At first, Nonaka had poor impressions of Yamada's work, as he believed it would not be as appealing as other SNK IPs. Nonaka's Kyo was inspired by rock singer Yutaka Ozaki, impressed by his rebellious personality and his appeal to Japanese people for writing inspiring lyrics. Seeing the similarities between Ozaki and Kyo's personalities, Nonaka wanted the latter to be like Ozaki. Nonaka's performance was well received, as he recalls having several fanletters involving several lines he made the character say, to the point Kyo became a more popular character than those from Art of Fighting and Fatal Fury. While recording The King of Fighters: Kyo, Nonaka revealed Kyo's more sensitive side when dealing with his girlfriend Yuki, the relationship which the actor favored for coming across as rather unique amongst SNK's works. Nonaka related to his character for being young and reckless until he "grew up" in his later appearances. Nonaka befriended Iori's actor Kunihiko Yasui and both noted that despite fans wanting their characters to become friendlier with each other, it did not appear to happen with Nonaka claiming that seems to be more common in action anime.

Tomoaki Maeno replaced Nonaka for The King of Fighters XIV and said he was putting in all his efforts into the project and hoped the fandom would enjoy it. Maeno was somewhat intimidated by the impact of Kyo as the main character from a famous game series. He often played The King of Fighters XIV as Kyo in order to fully appreciate the character. For The King of Fighters for Girls, Maeno was careful with his performance as he understood how beloved his character is. He was careful in his songs and took a liking to the catchphrase "Moetaro?" (Japanese: Got burned?). Yuichi Nakamura portrayed Kyo in a commercial promoting the cellphone game The King of Fighters All Stars.

=== Development ===
Kyo's repeated appearances in every game in the series, at the insistence of SNK executives for marketing purposes, made story planning for each title challenging. Kyo and Iori were supposed to be removed after The King of Fighters '98 due to business reasons, but in the end, they have continued to appear ever since due to fans' demands. In the NESTS arc, Kyo then to some extent is involved in the story in terms of his connections with the new protagonist K'. Though K' was consistently promoted in each game port, Kyo was added to the Neo Geo CD's cover alongside him since Kyo leading his existence in the game to become popular knowledge. SNK chose to expand the previous Orochi's arc primarily focusing on Kyo Kusanagi, leading to the spin-offs The King of Fighters EX: Neo Blood and The King of Fighters EX2: Howling Blood where his role from the Orochi arc is expanded.

The developers of Eolith, the series for The King of Fighters 2001, noted that Kyo and Iori were also popular in Korea, which led to the characters' immediate inclusion in their game when compared with the two previous installments where they had no official teams and were hidden. In the "Ash Saga", Kyo, Iori, and Chizuru's Three Sacred Treasures play a major role in the story. Both the Ash arc and Maximum Impact games were developed at the same time, which resulted in Kyo and Iori still playing a major role in the Another Day original video animation that promoted Maximum Impact 2. Furthermore, despite Ash being the protagonist of The King of Fighters XIII, the PlayStation 3 port of the game instead had Kyo used on the cover as means to promote more familiar characters. Eisuke Ogura claimed the staff originally were not confident with using Shun'ei as the sole protagonist in The King of Fighters XIV so for such installment the team decided to focus on Kyo and Iori again as the biggest focus.

=== Designs ===
Kyo undergoes redesigns in the NESTS saga (left) and Ash saga (right) with KOF XIII using both to represent different fighting styles the characters use.

When designing Kyo, developers wanted a new, "snazzy" hero who would fight against characters from other SNK series, Fatal Fury, Psycho Soldier, Ikari Warriors and Art of Fighting, eventually outshining them. Artist Shinichi Morioka designed Kyo, citing Akira Fudo from Go Nagai's Devilman manga and, and Shotaro Kaneda from Akira as major influences. Kyo's pixel art was created by Hiraki, who, despite leaving SNK to work on another project a few years later, was asked by Capcom's Kaname Fujioka to once again work on Kyo's design for the crossover game Capcom vs. SNK: Millennium Fight 2000. Several of the series' designers said Kyo is one of the most difficult characters to illustrate because of his popularity. As the "face" of The King of Fighters, Kyo's sprites were made by Toyohisa Tanabe, who aimed to be careful in designing him. In contrast to the other popular fighting game characters like Liu Kang from Mortal Kombat or Sagat from Street Fighter, Kyo was given a more realistic and stylish look, as Tanabe found other icons cartoony. In his first appearances, Kyo wears a modified version of his school uniform with a sun mark that represents his heritage as knitted by Yuki.

For the NESTS story arc starting in KOF '99, Kyo has been wearing a casual outfit designed by Toshiyuki Kotani, also known as "styleos". In Shinsetsu Samurai Spirits Bushidō Retsuden Kyo wears his father's green-themed traditional martial artist outfit with prayer beads around his neck while keeping his original bandana with the Kusanagi crest. Falcoon redesigned Kyo's jacket for the spin-off game KOF: Maximum Impact 2 while keeping the appeal of the original costume. The King of Fighters 2003 sees Kyo sporting a new outfit with on a zipper black jacket and classical gloves by Reiko Masuyama. The Kusanagi Sun sign remained on Kyo's leather jacket. In The King of Fighters XII and The King of Fighters XIII, Kyo was given a more masculine appearance, sporting a biker jacket. Artist Eisuke Ogura expressed pressure when designing this incarnation of the character, saying it had to live up to an enduring reputation created by Shinkiro.

In the making of The King of Fighters XIV, Yasuyuki Oda wanted to change Kyo's design as he did not like how he became a strikingly macho fighter in The King of Fighters XIII and thus wanted to give him a simpler and more modern appearance even if he became irrecongnizable with his new look. Character designer Nobuyuki Kuroki said the staff wanted to captivate new fans with Kyo's larger design regardless of negative backlash. His appearance in The King of Fighters XV was altered to resemble his clasic bring back his bandana and gloves according to the newer artist Tomohiro Nakata.

=== Gameplay ===
The game's developers decided Kyo's main abilities would be fire-based, inspired by the manga and anime Getter Robo by Go Nagai and Ken Ishikawa. The elements and the personalities were also a homage to a Japanese phrase about giving birth to fire: "lightning strikes the earth which sparks the flame". In his debut, Kyo fights with the Kusanagi Style of Ancient Martial Arts (草薙流古武术, Kusanagi-ryū Kobujutsu), attacking opponents using flames and a personal style of kenpō. This was developed by animator Mitsuo Kodama. Kyo was created originally as an all-rounder with a projectile, "108 Shiki Yami Barai" (百八式闇払), an easily used anti-air move, being SNK's answer to Ryu's Hadoken among other famous projectile techniques seen in fighting games. Despite the character's lazy demeanor, SNK made him develop new moves per each game to show that he actually takes fighting seriously, such as the 212 Shiki Koto Tsuki You (弐百拾弐式・琴月 陽, lit. "Method 212: Zither Moon Yang") where he grabs a foe with his hand and creates an explosion.

Kyo's signature Desperation Move is the Ura 108 Shiki: Orochinagi (裏百八式・大蛇薙; lit. "Back Crescent Eighth Formula – Serpent Wave"), a massive carefully animated slash of fire he creates using one hand. The Orochinagi was conceptualized as the move Kyo would use to defeat the demon known as Yamata no Orochi. Starting with The King of Fighters '96, his projectile was removed in favor of hand-to-hand combat, done as part of the series' overhaul to make Kyo's character more unique. Kyo's gameplay was modified again, for The King of Fighters '99 and onwards Kyo got an ability to perform variations of his father's moves that are similar to the 427 Shiki Hikigane (四百弐拾七式・轢鉄; lit. "Method 427: Plowing Iron") flaming punches as well as a new Desperation Move known as "182 Shiki" (百八拾弐式; lit. "Method 182") charged punch which was revisited in future installments.

In The King of Fighters XII, Kyo's moves were modified to rely on his projectile, functioning closer to the first two games of the series. Kyo's Neo Max from XIII technique, the "Ura 121 Shiki: Ama-no-Murakumo" (裏百弐拾壱式・天叢雲), in which he covers the enemies with walls of fire, was the first move of this category to be made for KOF XIII. The DLC "NESTS Kyo" focuses on his hand-to-hand combat, labeled as "Rekka" in gaming community. SNK ensured neither Kyo version would be superior to the other. Besides retaining the Orochinagi, NESTS Kyo has the "Saihsuu Kessen Ougi: Mushiki" (最終決戦奥義・無式; lit. "Final Showdown Ultimate Technique: No Style), a move originally used in The King of Fighters '97 where he consecutively punches the enemy with increasing flame damage for each consecutive strike. Mastering the technique in the spin-off The King of Fighters: Kyo, makes Saisyu approve his son as the proper Kusanagi successor. NESTS Kyo's Neo Max is a new technique named "Saishuu Kessen Hiougi Totsuka" (最終決戦秘 奥義; lit. "Final Battle Secret Mystery, Token"), which covers the entire screen in flames. For The King of Fighters XIV onwards, Oda wanted to keep Kyo's kenpō gameplay intact in order to avoid fan backlash, using hand-to-hand combat in a more aggressive fashion.

== Appearances ==
=== In video games ===
==== In The King of Fighters ====
Kyo is the head of the Kusanagi clan of martial artists who can create fire, surpassing his father and mentor Saisyu at the age of 15, years before his debut as a fighter as his father went missing before his debut. Several years before the games, the Kusanagi and Yasakani clans were allies until the latter made a pact with the snake demon Orochi, creating a ridge. However, Kyo's rivalry with the Yasakani descendant Iori Yagami is one of mutual hatred rather than history. Following his training, Kyo's father went missing. He becomes a fighter wearing a high school uniform which was knitted with Kusanagi crest by his girlfriend Yuki. In the first King of Fighters video game, Kyo stars in the famous fighting tournament as the leader of the Japan Team along with Benimaru Nikaido and Goro Daimon, becoming rookie champions by defeating the host, Rugal Bernstein and revenging the death of Kyo's father, Saisyu, deciding to train to win the next tournament again. In the next title, Rugal has revived and brainwashed Saisyu in revenge but Kyo makes him regain his sense. Rugal uses the power of Orochi to face Kyo but following his defeat, it consumes his entire body. For The King of Fighters '96, Kyo trains alone to develop a fighting style to defeat the mysterious Goenitz. In Chizuru Kagura's tournament, the host wants Kyo and Iori on her team to help defeat Orochi, eventually taking down its servant Goenitz together. In The King of Fighters '97, Kyo faces Orochi's remaining followers, the New Faces Team, who aim to revive Orochi by sacrificing Kyo's girlfriend, Yuki. Kyo and Iori eventually defeat the revived Orochi. In KOF '98, Kyo appears in the classic Japan Team and as an alternative version with moves used in previous games.

Kyo is a secret character in The King of Fighters '99 which reveals he was kidnapped by the NESTS syndicate following Orochi's defeat, resulting in the creation of clones of himself as well as experiments including the new protagonist K' and the villain Krizalid. If the player has accrued enough points, Kyo can be faced in a bonus fight. He continues his fight alone in The King of Fighters 2000 where he meets Krizalid's superior Zero in his last moments, but in The King of Fighters 2001, he reunites with his old teammates and his self-proclaimed student Shingo Yabuki to face the remaining NESTS agents and return home to Yuki in the aftermath. In KOF 2002, Kyo is a playable character on the original Japan Team.

In The King of Fighters 2003, Kyo and Iori join Chizuru's to investigate Orochi seal which is weakened by Botan and Mukai from Those From The Past, while Chizuru's powers are stolen by the mysterious fighter Ash Crimson. Kyo and Iori join forces in The King of Fighters XI, where Iori becomes instead the new victim after wounding Kyo. The PlayStation 2 port of XI added an alternative version of Kyo that has his NESTS saga moves while the KOF XII instead has no narartive. In The King of Fighters XIII Kyo escapes from the hospital despite not being fully recovered to join the Japan Team in new tournament, eventually becoming the champion following Ash's disappearance. Additionally, an alternative version of himself with different moves called "NESTS Style Kyo" is available as downloadable content. In a new saga that kicks off with The King of Fighters XIV Kyo's old comrades, at Saisyu's request of his father, meet Tung Fu Rue's students who need help controlling their powers, with Chizuru once again reuniting the Sacred Treasures in The King of Fighters XV to protect the seal and thus requests Benimaru to aid Tung Fu's students in his place.

Kyo appears in multiple spin-offs like The King of Fighters: Kyo, taking place during events of KOF '97 focused on events of Kyo's personal life, like his life with Yuki and other retired Kusanagi fighters he trained with. The King of Fighters R-1 again reprises the events of KOF '97, while he teams up with his father and Shingo in The King of Fighters R-2. He is present in the spin-off Neowave with the original Esaka Team. During The King of Fighters EX: Neo Blood, Kyo stops South Town lord Geese Howard from manipulating Iori, while in EX2: Howling Blood, he and other Sacred Treasures try to stop Goenitz's revival. In Maximum Impact Kyo fights in tournaments from South Town but is more worried about his romance with Yuki in the first installment, and wonders what will happen to Iori's life once they settled their rivalry in the sequel. He is present in the Chinese mobile phone games KOF: WORLD and KOF X Arena Masters. In the role-playing game The King of Fighters All Star, Kyo is playable in multiple forms. For the otome game King of Fighters for Girls, Kyo can be dated.

=== In other games ===
Kyo has also appeared in video games outside The King of Fighters series. He is a playable character in the shooter games Sky Stage, its expansion Neo Geo Heroes: Ultimate Shooting, NeoGeo Tennis Coliseum, and the rhythm-action mobile game The Rhythm Of Fighters. He is featured in the 2018 augmented reality game The King of Fighters Orochi Go and the Korean fighting game The King of Cyphers. He is present in the crossover video games Neo Geo Battle Coliseum and the SNK vs. Capcom series. A past persona of Kyo also appears in Shinsetsu Samurai Spirits Bushidō Retsuden, in charge of protecting the Orochi seal with the assistance of the protagonist Hisame Shizumaru and Iori's predecessor.

He is featured in the card-battle video games Lord of Vermillion Re:2's Tie-Ups and Core Masters and the fighting game Lost Saga. Despite not being playable in SNK Gals' Fighters and SNK Heroines: Tag Team Frenzy, he appears in the endings. He is present in the RPGs Kimi wa Hero in his regular persona and in a vampire outfit in Brave Frontier, and in the Chinese mobile phone game Wangzhe Rongyao. He is available in the mobile games The King Fighters X Fatal Fury, Puzzle and Dragons, Boku & Dragon, and Crusaders Quest. He is present in the dating sim part of the Days of Memories series, Metal Slug Defense, and the beat-em-up Fighting Days. A shooting game named Beast Busters has Kyo as a guest character, as does Lucent Heart. Additionally, he is used in the action role-playing game Phantasy Star Online 2. and appears in Another Eden as a guest character.

=== In other media ===
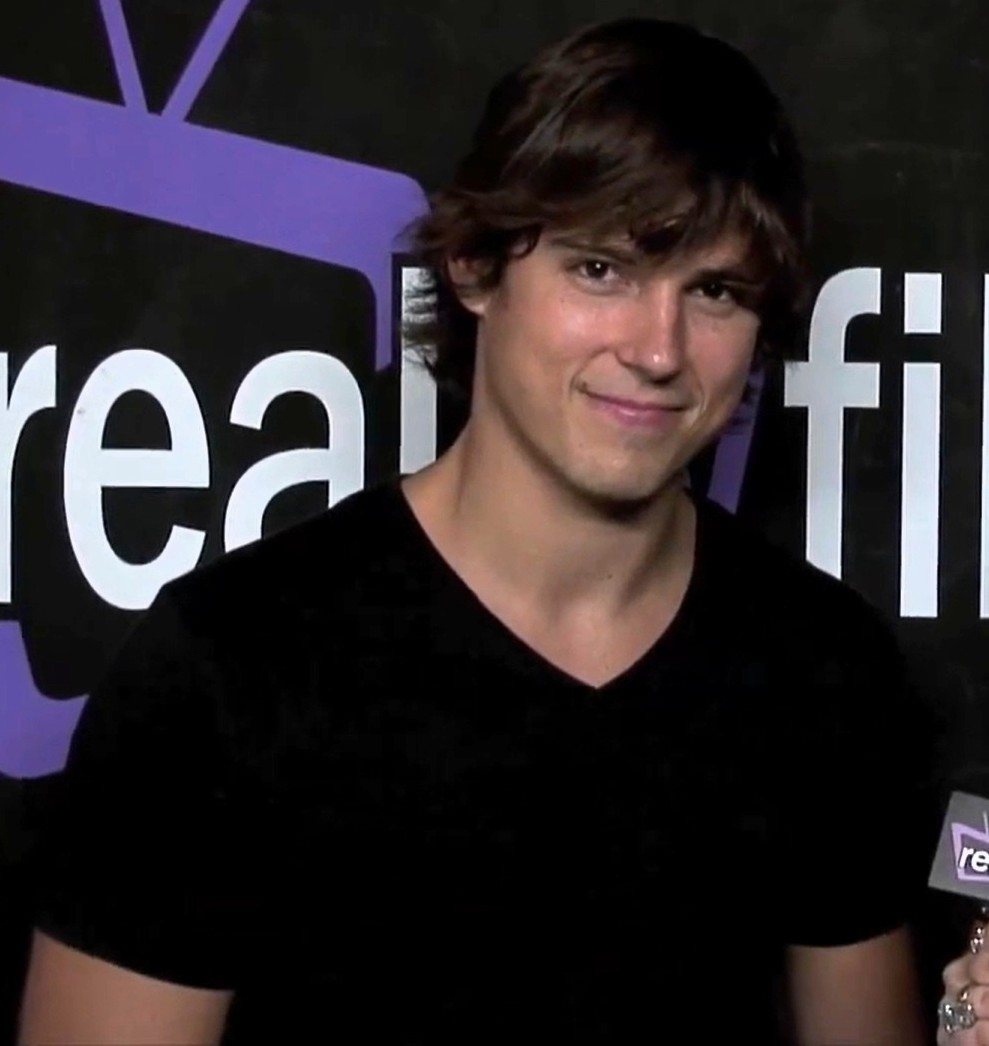
Sean Faris portrayed Kyo in the live-action movie

Aside from the main series, Kyo has appeared in other media from The King of Fighters series. He is prominently featured in the fourth chapter of The King of Fighters: Another Day anime as Ash Crimson stages a fight against Alba Miera, both of whom are stopped by Iori. A number of image songs and audio dramas featuring Kyo have been released, including the contents of his own character-image album consisting of a number of his theme songs.

Kyo also appeared in printed adaptations like manhua and light novels. Andy Seto wrote two original stories involving his transformation into a fighter, and a retelling of the NESTS arc from his point of view in The King of Fighters Zillion. The spin-off manga story entitled The King of Fighters: Kyo was created by Masato Natsumoto and deals with Kyo's daily life. In the KOF XII manhua, Kyo's role in the Ash is retold as he faces Mukai in KOF 2003 retelling, Magaki in the aftermath and later Ash after recovering from Iori's attack. In the manga The King of Fighters: A New Beginning, Kyo once again battles his rival who takes a corrupted form and other invading enemies.

In The King of Fighters movie, Kyo is played by Sean Faris and is portrayed as a biracial Japanese-American. During the story, Kyo joins forces with Iori and Mai Shiranui to defeat Rugal. Eventually Kyo summons the ancient Kusanagi no Tsurugi weapon, which he wields to kill Rugal. Faris spent a month learning how to use a katana when preparing for his role and took up basic karate.

In the CGI web series The King of Fighters: Destiny, Kyo goes to his first team tournament with Benimaru and Daimon. The web series has an extra episode that shows Kyo befriending Benimaru during a fight against multiple yakuza. After saving the tournament's fighters from Orochi's power, which causes them to go berserk, Kyo defeats the mastermind Rugal. Outside SNK works, he makes a cameo in Street Fighter: Sakura Ganbaru! alongside Shingo who enters a fighting competition while Kyo tries to learn about Ryu's fighting style.

== Reception ==
=== Promotion ===
For the Orochi arc of The King of Fighters, Kyo was always the main focus of Shinkiro's illustrations which were praised by Famitsu for details given to the protagonist. In a retrospective article, Polygon noted The King of Fighters story arcs involving the character fighting across in different eras with the era of K' starting in The King of Fighters '99 where he replaces the previous protagonist Kyo as one of the most marketable characters often seen in promotional artwork from the game. Although Kyo's story arc ends with The King of Fighters '97, he has remained a more popular hero than his successors like Ash Crimson in Western regions, which led to Ignition Entertainment promoting KOF XII using him, whereas Famitsu noted he was still the center of attention when SNK was promoting XIV. In 2020, SNK held the pop-up shop event "Kyo Kusanagi Exhibition", hosted by Indoor Co., Ltd. in Akihabara, which presented to the audience with merchandising featuring the image of the character. In both 1994 and 2025, the character has appeared in polls of the most popular characters in gaming and SNK, respectively.

In November 2024, Tanita made an official collaboration with SNK, which involved merchandising and studying the bodies of Kyo, among other characters from the series. Kyo also gained appeal thanks to the Capcom vs. SNK series, and particularly the rivalry between him and Ryu from Street Fighter, the rivalry which inspired the image used for Japanese printed ad promoting Capcom VS SNK 2 on a cross-platform. According to VG247, early promotion of Capcom and SNK crossover games involving Sakura Kasugano from Street Fighter and Kyo playing the video games was a major surprise to the audience back in the early 2000s. Despite Kyo being in most original Capcom VS. SNK works from the 2000s as SNK's figure, Yahoo! News noticed that he became absent from most promotions of modern collections of the crossovers due to his lack of usage in other games. Anime News Network expressed disappointment that Kyo was not picked as a SNK representative character in Super Smash Bros. Ultimate, as he had few guest appearances in comparison to Terry Bogard. Dexerto wanted him to appear in Smash because his gameplay could not properly match other video game icons. IGN enjoyed the character enough to want him playable in Namco's fighting game Tekken 8, justified by the inclusion of fellow character Geese Howard in the previous game, Tekken 7. In 2025, Turtle Beach Corporation produced a series of gaming controllers featuring Kyo's image.

=== Critical response ===
Kyo Kusanagi has received major praise ever since his inclusion into the book 1001 Video Games You Must Play Before You Die, regarding him as the most iconic character from The King of Fighters. However, when it came to Chinese comics, Gamer TW said Kyo was not a popular character until Iori was introduced and their rivalry was portrayed in a complex way. Den of Geek felt Kyo's personality was similar to Ryu's from Street Fighter, because both are initially driven by the idea of competition and later portrayed in a more serious fashion when facing the bosses of their respective games. Game Software Magazine said that despite Kyo's simplistic nature, he is still a charming character which made several of his fans jealous of his girlfriend Yuki and their close relationship. Developers from Capcom believed that Kyo was more impressive in early The King of Fighters games. Multiple critics said Kyo stood out more than the Fatal Fury and Art of Fighting characters. IGN chose his part of the story in KOF '94 as the saddest due to his revenge against Rugal Bernstein who killed his father. When it came to the Orochi arc, Den of Geek said the lead becomes more likable, while Kotaku highlighted him as the most heroic character when facing enemies in the narrative. The formation of the new Sacred Treasure Team was noted to be a proper conclusion to the Orochi story arc and the character as it focuses on the protagonist's personal life, while further improving his dynamic with his rival Iori Yagami with Nintendo World Report calling the end an "epic and heroic battle".

Following the Orochi arc, Retronauts recalled that Kyo and Iori being removed from The King of Fighters '99 was shocking upon release which led to their eventual return as hidden due to negative feedback with Nintendo World Report finding them important for the series even if their arc ended. Gamer TW said the duo of Kyo and Iori felt like Dragon Ball Z characters due to how overpowered they were in the first The King of Fighters '99 comic to the point of overshadowing the new lead K'. For the final installment of the NESTS arc, The King of Fighters 2001, the character was appreciated for having a more notable role that in previous games. In retrospect, ItMedia called him the central character of the series ever since his introduction despite being there being other protagonists, resulting into multiple spin-off appearances still appearing in the most recent The King of Fighters XV. The site added that he comes across as an unconventional character for having confidence about his skill as well as a somewhat idiosyncratic personality. Though the character changed gameplay across the installments, the original has often being brought back as either alterate versions or clones. Saiga Nak said that while Kyo stopped being the series' protagonist, he remains a strong narrative figure, earning him the title of "honorary protagonist of the KOF series for life!".

For the spin-off game The King of Fighters: Kyo, Hardcore Gaming 101 and Time Extension appreciated the portayal Kyo's social life, expanding on his romance with Yuki, and deep bond with his cousins Souji and Aoi Kusanagi. Loading Extra especially noted that Kyo's desire to protect Yuki comes as a major character arc as his rage for finding his missing girlfriend results in him mastering the ultimate Kusanagi move, the Mu Shiki, and becomes recognized by his father as the real Kusanagi head. Kyo's role in the manga A New Beginning was also the subject of praise for his encounter with Iori highlighting their famous rivalry especially because the latter is possessed by the demon Orochi. According to AnimeAnime, Kyo's character is known for his personality and looks that helped to promote the otome game The King of Fighters For Girls, though ItMedia found his SNK All-Stars version to be out of character for being portrayed as more moral. His guest appearance in Fantasy Fighter was praised by 17173 for retaining his stylish design as well as incorporating his unique techniques from his series.

The character's designs also garnered praise, with RPGFan acclaiming The King of Fighters '99 as one of the best from the year of its debut, and Goziline commending its departure from the high school style after he removed his original bandana during his debut becoming more unique in the process. On the other hand, Kyo received a negative response for his King of Fighters XIV design, as it was not faithful to the original, leading SNK artist Hiroaki Hashimoto to state that it was hard for SNK to keep coming up with equally appealing forms with new installments. Kyo's design from The King of Fighters XV apppealed to Saiga Nak for blending both classic and modern clothing. The character's first Desperation Move "Orochinagi" was praised by Prima Games and Kakuchopurei for its visuals and impact produced during its execution. Shoryuken noticed the two takes of Kyo's fighting style are highly distinctive due to the original relying on projectile moves while the second one focuses on hand-to-hand combat (nicknamed "Rekka") strong enough to surpass the classic Kyo. His fighting mechanics came across as one of the most innovative parts of The King of Fighters XIII gameplay.

=== Analysis ===
The book Video Game Audio: A History, 1972-2020 opined that the theme song "Esaka" reflects the character's rebellious personality whereas the NESTS arc theme "Tears" instead evokes a sense of sadness as a result of the different characterization. The commentary of Kyo's design featured in the book Gaming Cultures and Place in Asia-Pacific noted Kyo's popularity in Hong Kong from the mid-1990s onwards as his outfit resulted in abundant cosplaying. This was especially notable as the character outshined Street Fighter characters who are instead more popular in Western countries.

In the book Representation of Observations in Reinforcement Learning for Playing Arcade Fighting Game, The King of Fighters '97 is seen as one of the most notable arcade game ever released with more complex moves than the ones SNK's rivals tend to use, which prompted the study to use the game to educate Multi-CNN Model and Transfer Learning. The search model, evaluating each character for 50 fights each, found that Kyo and Iori are the ones used the most, and with the Kyo requiring the most hours for the model to adapt to. In the book Design, User Experience, and Usability, the original Kyo was noted to be one of the most complex fighting game characters due to the need of large-range actions that demand high levels of skills that can lead to physical burden and frustration. Regardless of the other type of moves Kyo's character can demand, the player interaction can remain rich and challenging to motivate more gamers, eventually reaching high levels of satisfaction.

In Big Movements or Small Motions: Controlling Digital Avatars with Single-Camera Motion Capture, several writers analyzed players' satisfaction levels when controlling Kyo in The King of Fighters XIII, chosen due to his iconic popularity, as players controlling him were given immersion in the fighting game. Successfully recreating Kyo's special moves, or the Orochinagi, was noted to leave a sense of satisfaction in the players. However, there are still several complex tactics the character is given that might result in stress to the player despite retaining a notable challenge factor.
