= Rosemary Leona =

Vanuatuan businesswoman

Rosemary Leona is a businesswoman from Vanuatu.

Leona was born and raised on Pentecost Island. She studied banking and finance at the University of Canberra and graduated with a bachelor of commerce degree. Her first career was in banking; she was a lending officer for ANZ Bank in Vanuatu and supported numerous individuals and small businesses to grow.

Leona is the owner of Vila Rose Hotel in Port Vila and runs a successful kava export business called ‘Vanuatu Wise’. She is also active in the Vanuatu Basketball Federation, serving as treasurer.
