= Leona Creek =

Stream in Victoria County, Texas, U.S.

Coordinates: 28.9557°N 96.8080°W

Leona Creek is a stream in Victoria County, Texas, in the United States.

Leona is a name derived from Spanish meaning "lioness".

== See also ==
- List of rivers of Texas
