= Leona Riemann =

German writer, author, and publisher

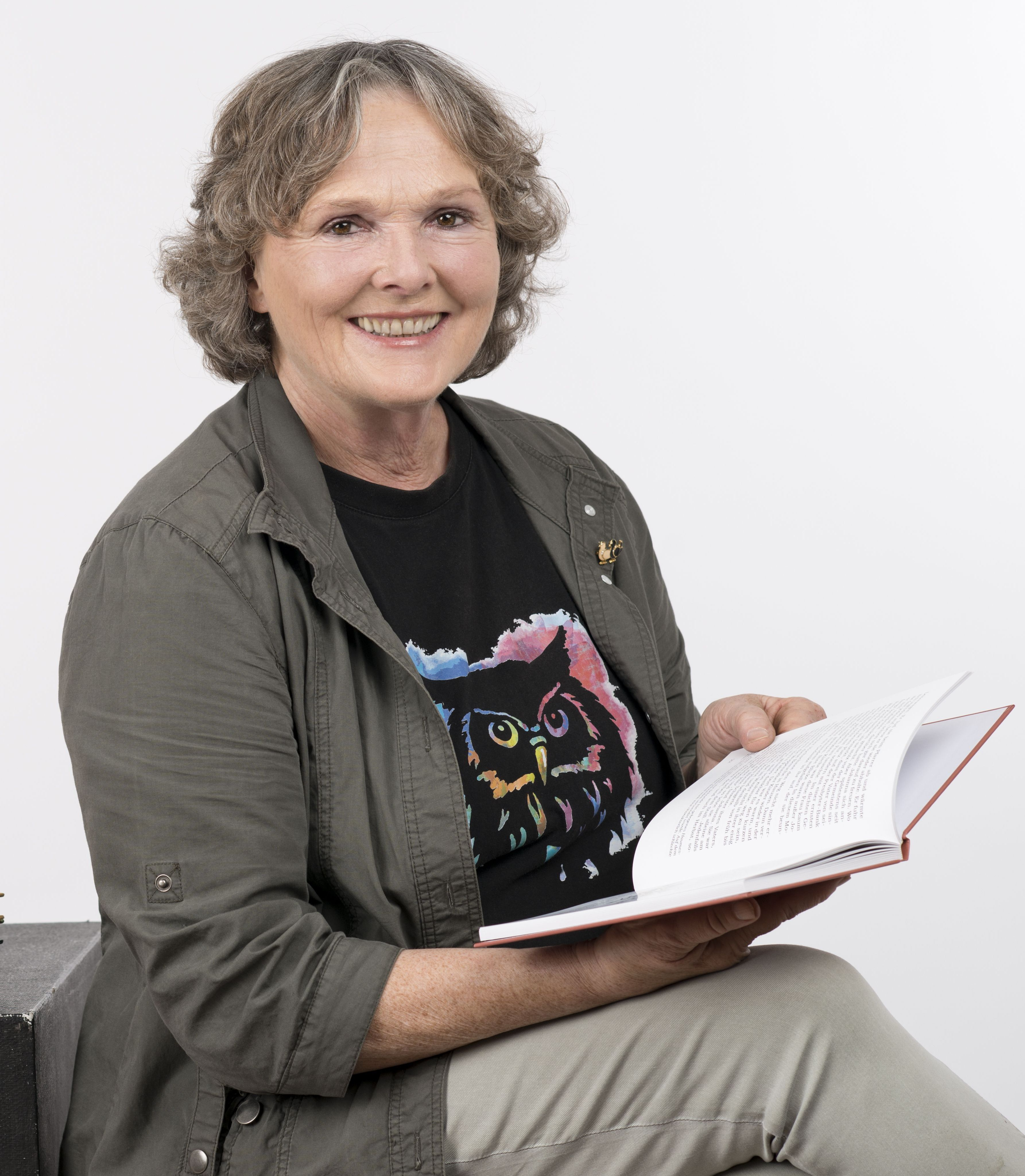
Leona Riemann in September 2021

Leona Riemann (born 28 November 1952) is a German writer, author, and publisher.

== Life and career ==
Raised in Wiesbaden, Leona Riemann began her academic journey after completing her university-entrance diploma in 1971, delving into English and French literature for teaching at Johannes Gutenberg University in Mainz, and studying education at Johann Wolfgang Goethe University Frankfurt am Main. Following the conclusion of her studies in October 1984, Riemann embarked on a career in education, serving as a teacher until 2018.

Since 1981, Leona Riemann has been active in the publishing and literary world, also writing under the pseudonym Anne Wolf. She took her passion for literature a step further by establishing the Hunsrücker publishing house in 2016.

Riemann, along with her family, has been residing in Gödenroth in the Hunsrück since 1997.

== Selected publications ==
- Hunsrücker Lebensbilder: Band 1. Eifeler Literaturverlag, Aachen 2023, ISBN 978-3-96123-076-1
- Hunsrücker: Band 5. Verlag Hunsrücker, Gödenroth 2022, ISBN 978-3-9822731-4-3
- Hunsrücker: Band 4. Verlag Hunsrücker, Gödenroth 2021, ISBN 978-3-9822731-0-5
- Hunsrücker zwischen Schiefer, Wald und Scholle: Anthologie. Hrsg. von Leona Riemann. Mit Beiträgen von Florian Kugel, Josef Peil, Erik Zimmermann, Kurt Stumm, Winfried Wagner u. a.; Verlag Hunsrücker, Gödenroth 2020, ISBN 978-3-00-065756-6
- Hunsrücker: Band 3. Verlag Hunsrücker, Gödenroth 2019, ISBN 978-3-00-062841-2
- Anne Wolf (Pseudonym): Underdogs. Roman, Verlag Hunsrücker, Gödenroth 2018, ISBN 978-3-00-058331-5
- Hunsrücker: Band 2. Verlag Hunsrücker, Gödenroth 2018, ISBN 978-3-00-060314-3
- Hunsrücker: Band 1. Verlag Hunsrücker, Gödenroth 2016, ISBN 978-3-00-059308-6
- Hundsrückmord: Hundekrimi. Kontrast-Verlag, Pfalzfeld 2004, ISBN 978-3-935286-43-5
