= Parque La Leona =

Coordinates: 14.1087°N 87.2029°W

Parque La Leona is an urban park located in Tegucigalpa, the capital of Honduras. It is located on a plateau overlooking the city, and holds a network of winding, often fairly steep stairs, steps, and pathways. There is a promontory with a large balcony that is a heavily photographed spot with it panoramic view of the city. It is located in a Spanish-built neighborhood with cobblestone streets.
