= Reona (given name) =

- Gender: Female

Origin
- Origin: Japanese
- Meaning: Different meanings depending on the kanji used

Reona (written: 玲緒樹, 玲阿奈 or レオナ in katakana) is a feminine Japanese given name. Notable people with the name include:

- Reona (レオナ; born 1998), Japanese musician and cosplayer
- Reona Aoki (青木 玲緒樹; born 1995), Japanese swimmer
- Reona Esaki (江崎 玲於奈; born 1925), Japanese physicist and laureate of 1973 Nobel Prize in Physics
- Reona Hirota (広田 レオナ; born 1963), Japanese actress
- Reona Ito (伊藤 玲阿奈; born 1979), Japanese conductor
- Reona Nyubara (鳰原 れおな), a fictional character and the keyboardist of Raise A Suilen in the musical anime and media franchise BanG Dream!
