= List of The King of Fighters characters =

All the original characters introduced in The King of Fighters game series

SNK's The King of Fighters (KOF) series includes a wide cast of characters, some of which are taken from other SNK games. The fighting games take place in a fictional universe in which an annual series of 3-on-3 or 4-on-4 fighting tournaments are held.

The first game in the KOF series introduces the initial protagonist, Kyo Kusanagi, a young Japanese fighter with pyrokinetic abilities who is the heir to a powerful group of martial artists. Kyo fights against the Kusanagi clan's enemies, his rival Iori Yagami, and the snake entity Orochi and its human followers, among others. The first four games in the series revolve about these fights, while The King of Fighters '99 introduces a second story arc, revolving around K', a young man who seeks to destroy the mysterious NESTS organization because they kidnapped him at an early age and stripped him of his past memories so they could force him into a fighter under their control. A third story arc focuses on Ash Crimson, a mysterious fighter with green flames who steals the powers of the clans that sealed Orochi in the past for unknown reasons. A mysterious group of villains, Those from the Past, also wants to obtain Orochi's power for the purpose of giving it to their unknown master. A fourth story arc currently involves Shun'ei, a young Chinese fighter who possesses unknown supernatural powers, as a result of being connected with Ash's time-traveling paradox.

The plot and the characters came from the Yamata no Orochi legend. There are also several characters in the games that are parodies or homages. Merchandise based on the characters has also been released, including action figures and keychains. The characters have garnered praise from several video game publications for the quality of their designs and movesets. Comments focused on the lack of improvements in some of the characters, but added that the roster is greatly diverse.

== Cast creation and influences ==
The concept of The King of Fighters originated as a Double Dragon-style side-scrolling beat 'em up titled Survivor after Street Fighter and Fatal Fury: King of Fighters creator Takashi Nishiyama appointed game designer Masanori Kuwasashi as the creator of a new SNK video game. It would have used only core characters from the Art of Fighting and Fatal Fury series, specifically allowing players to play Robert Garcia and Terry Bogard for location testing. The idea was abandoned due to the poor popularity of beat em up games in the 1990s. Since the developers were attached to the idea of the two series cross-over, they eventually agreed to make their idea into a fighting game. Characters from the Ikari Warriors and Psycho Soldier games were added in the spirit of other gaming genres considered for their final product. The concept of a three-man team was one of the ideas kept from the side-scrolling version. Kuwasashi expressed early concerns about introducing a young lead character who might clash with the established veteran fighters, but ultimately believed it would benefit sales after a talk with Nishiyama. This eventually led to creation of a new hero character named Kyo Kusanagi. Yuichiro Hiraki created Kyo as his answer towards Street Fighter lead Ryu while being inspired by the boxing manga character Joe Yabuki from Ashita no Joe. Flagship director Toyohisa Tanabe asserts that the Art of Fighting and Fatal Fury fighters were added specifically for adults. The newer King of Fighters characters were aimed to appeal to younger and newer audiences. He agreed to include characters such as Benimaru Nikaido and Chang Koehan to add an off-beat variety to the cast, which he had previously deemed to be too serious.

The King of Fighters '95 started its own narrative, with its first arc being called the "Orochi arc". For this Kyo's rival Iori Yagami, who has similar characteristics to Kyo. Kuwasashi was responsible for the Orochi arc. Saisyu was added at the last minute as he originally died in The King of Fighters '94 during one of the cut-scenes from the Hero Team. However, when it came to Kyo's girlfriend mentioned in his file, the director was against using her. The King of Fighters '96 created new multiple characters including Leona who was the company's response to Street Fighter character Cammy; both are implosion assassins, while Goentiz was meant to be an overpowered boss superior to Rugal.

In The King of Fighters '99, to contrast the previous protagonist, K' was made to be the "dark hero". The introduction of K' to the KOF series was meant to remove popular characters Kyo Kusanagi and Iori Yagami from the roster, though this idea was scrapped in the game's release. Due to the large additions of teenage characters in the series, SNK decided to add several middle-age ones to balance them. Several characters were added to the roster by Eolith's desire when this company sponsored SNK to attract fans from Eolith's region, ,leading to the creation of May Lee. In preparing the boss characters, the original team was dissatisfied with Zero's portrayal in The King of Fighters 2000, which led to the inclusion of the real Zero. The final boss, Igniz, was conceptualized as a sexually appealing character in order to generate a contrast with other members of the cast.

The Ash saga led to the creation of characters who would confuse the audience with the protagonist Ash Crimson being designed as an "attractive evil character", whereas his teammate Shen Woo seemed more like the series' main character than Ash did. Adelheid was added in an attempt to appeal to a wider audience and to add additional depth to the narrative of the series. Besides the new original characters, the Ash saga also had more guest including the Fatal Fury sequel Garou: Mark of the Wolves as its narrative lacked closure and no sequel was produced, while XI added mid-bosses from Buriki One and Kizuna Encounter who were meant to surprise gamers. For The King of Fighters XIII characters like Kyo, Mai and King were given back their classic fighting styles. Artist Eisuke Ogura aimed to make Kyo's design as appealing as Shinkiro's.

For the New Age saga, Fatal Fury designer Yasuyuki Oda created the first mainline KOF with 3D visuals inspired by Virtua Fighter which led to diffulties in the new models. said while researching for the game's new characters, they avoided stereotypes like Japanese sumo wrestlers to produce more diversity in the cast which includes characters of various nationalities. Oda coined the term "Kyo-ify" based on the series' main character Kyo Kusanagi in regards to the stylishness presented in the cast. As a result, Oda wanted the fighters to look as appealing as Kyo. Art director Nobuyuki Kuroki redesigned Kyo and Iori underwent major redesigns to fit the series' new story arc depite fear of negative backlash. Ogura took over Kuroki's role as art director in The King of Fighters XV, aiming to improve issues the previous installment suffered, resulting in more stylish designs and better 3D models.

== Introduced in The King of Fighters '94 ==
=== Kyo Kusanagi ===
Voiced by: Masahiro Nonaka (KOF '94–XIII), Tomoaki Maeno (KOF XIV onwards)

Kyo Kusanagi (草薙 京, Kusanagi Kyō) is a high school student whose family possesses an ancient set of pyrokinetic abilities. Kyo is the leader of Japan Team and one of the three Sacred Treasures.

=== Benimaru Nikaido ===
Voiced by: Monster Maezuka (most games), Hikaru Midorikawa (KOF '94 drama CD), Genki Okawa (KOF for Girls)

Benimaru Nikaido (二階堂 紅丸, Nikaidō Benimaru) is a model who fights with shootboxing and has electrokinetic abilities.

=== Goro Daimon ===
Voiced by: Masaki Usui (KOF '94–XIII), Ryūzaburō Ōtomo (KOF '94 drama CD), Takahiro Fujiwara (KOF XIV–KOFAS), Shunsuke Takeuchi (KOF for Girls)

Goro Daimon (大門 五郎, Daimon Gorō) is a former gold medalist in Judo and a mentor to his own dojo. After KOF '97, Daimon retires from being a fighter and returns to the Judo circuit representing Japan.

=== Heidern ===
Heidern (Japanese: ハイデルン, Hepburn: Haiderun) is a master of his own brutal self-made martial art, involving cutting with the use of bladed gloves, which seem to conceal explosives and a form of energy generator. He appears in the series as the leader of Ikari Warriors Team (also called Team Brazil) overseeing criminals that might be involved in the series' tournaments, most notably the criminal Rugal Bernstein who killed his family.

=== Chin Gentsai ===
Voiced by: Toshikazu Nishimura (KOF '94–2002), Matsuo Matsuo (KOF XII–XIII), Shintaro Tanaka (KOF XIV onwards)

Chin Gentsai is an elderly fighter who uses various styles of Kung Fu and fights primarily with drunken boxing. An original member of the Psycho Soldier Team, Chin is Athena and Kensou's master and also a mentor to Bao and Momoko.

=== Chang Koehan ===
Voiced by: Hiroyuki Arita (most games)

Chang Koehan is a giant criminal who fights with a large metal ball attached to a chain. He is also a member of Kim Kaphwan's team alongside Choi.

=== Choi Bounge ===
Voiced by: Monster Maezuka (most games)

Choi Bounge is a small criminal who fights with Freddy Krueger-esque claws. He is also a member of Kim Kaphwan's team alongside Chang.

=== Heavy D! ===
Voiced by: Toshikazu Nishimura (KOF '94, KOF '98), Takayuki Nakatsukasa (KOF: Destiny onwards) (Heavy D!)

Heavy D! is a professional boxer who was banned from regular competition after severely injuring his opponent. While introduced in The King of Fighters '94, he only returns in The King of Fighters '98.

=== Lucky Glauber ===
Voiced by: Kay Inage (KOF '94, KOF '98), Haruo Yamagishi (KOF: Destiny onwards) (Lucky)

Lucky Glauber is a former professional basketball player and a Karate champion with a penchant for street fighting. While introduced in The King of Fighters '94, he only returns in The King of Fighters '98.

=== Brian Battler ===
Voiced by: Eiji Yano (KOF '94, KOF '98), Taro Kiuchi (KOF: Destiny onwards) (Brian), Rie Suegara (New Brian; KOFAS)

Brian Battler is an American football player who also makes use of wrestling. While introduced in The King of Fighters '94, he only returns in The King of Fighters '98.

=== Rugal Bernstein ===
Voiced by: Toshimitsu Arai (KOF '94-2002: UM), Norio Wakamoto (KOF 2002), Tsuguo Mogami (KOF: Destiny onwards)

Rugal Bernstein is an arms dealer and the organizer of The King of Fighters tournament. Capable of copying any technique after seeing it performed once, he makes heavy use of Geese Howard's Reppuuken and Wolfgang Krauser's Kaiser Wave ki-attacks. Rugal also has techniques of his own, such as a slashing kick called Genocide Cutter. In KOF '95, he appears in his superpowered form. His regular form can be selected in KOF '98 and its Ultimate Match remake. Omega Rugal returns in KOF 2002 and its Unlimited Match remake as well as in KOF XV.

== Introduced in The King of Fighters '95 ==
=== Iori Yagami ===
Iori Yagami is a descendant of Yasakani, gifting him blue flames that he uses to fight. However, the curse of the Orochi gives him a berserker form in KOF '97 called Orochi Iori which appears as a boss. Iori also often appears as Kyo's rivals not because of their clans' past but because of a personal grudge.

=== Saisyu Kusanagi ===
Voiced by: Toshimitsu Arai (KOF '95), Keiichirou Sakagi (KOF '98), Haruo Yamagishi (KOF: D onwards)

Saisyu Kusanagi (草薙 柴舟, Kusanagi Saishū) debuted in The King of Fighters '94 as a victim in Rugal's gallery of defeated fighters. He appears as a sub-boss in The King of Fighters '95, and becomes playable for the first time on the screen in The King of Fighters '98, although he was selectable in the console versions of The King of Fighters '95 as a secret character. He was originally meant to have died in The King of Fighters '94, but was added in at the last minute of development for The King of Fighters '95.

Saisyu Kusanagi is the previous head of the Kusanagi clan, who left his family to face worthy opponents across the globe. After his defeat by Rugal, he is brainwashed by his secretary Vice to fight his son, Kyo. Upon his defeat, he regains his senses and escapes from Rugal's missile silo base. Although Saisyu is missing, in The King of Fighters 2001, he appears before Shingo Yabuki and spends a year properly teaching him the Kusanagi fighting style. He is still playable in The King of Fighters '98 and Neowave. He returns in the story during the prologue from The King of Fighters XIV asking Kyo to meet Tung Fu Rue in the upcoming competition. In the 2010 live-action film adaptation of The King of Fighters, Saisyu is played by Japanese actor Hiro Kanagawa.

== Introduced in The King of Fighters '96 ==
=== Leona Heidern ===
Leona Heidern (レオナ, Reona), Heidern's adopted daughter introduced in The King of Fighters '96, replaces him as he takes on a more active role behind the scenes, investigating occurrences parallel to the tournament. Although she tends to be very quiet, Leona was conceived to be an Orochi descendant at the time of her debut, and her designers took special care to let their interests at the time reflect in her actions. Her official nickname is The Silent Soldier. Although she recovers from her childhood trauma at the end of King of Fighters '97, she leaves the team after attacking her friends in the Riot of the Blood state at the conclusion of King of Fighters 2003 and tries to regain her focus from within her personal time.

=== Vice and Mature ===
Voiced by: Masae Yumi (KOF '96–KOF XIII), Mayumi Sako (KOF XIV onwards) (Vice)
Voiced by: Hiroko Tsuji (KOF '96–KOF XIII), Keiko Tsutsui (KOF XIV), Yū Shimamura (KOF: D onwards) (Mature)

Vice (バイス, Baisu) and Mature (マチュア, Machua) appear as members of Iori's Team in The King of Fighters '96. The designers at the time created both Vice and Mature with the image of a "cruel woman" and a "ruthless woman", respectively. Their origin story is mostly based on the notion of Rugal employing secretaries prior to The King of Fighters '96. Both women were unavailable during location testing and were likely finished near the end of the game's production schedule. Aside from serving Rugal, both women were also spies and wielders of Orochi. They form a team with Iori in order to keep an eye on him, but both of them are killed by Iori.

Since then, both have appeared in the "dream match" games The King of Fighters '98 and The King of Fighters 2002 (games in the King of Fighters series with no canonical connection). Vice has also appeared in Capcom vs. SNK: Millennium Fight 2000 and the sequel. Mature is a playable character in The King of Fighters XII, exclusive to the home console version of game. With Vice's return in The King of Fighters XIII, Iori's 1996 team is reunited for the first time since The King of Fighters 2002. In The King of Fighters XIII, both women are spirits, reflecting their fates at the end of the 1996 tournament. With the rise of a new Orochi crisis brought on by Ash Crimson's meddling, they convince Iori to enter the new tournament to settle matters and stop whatever it is Ash has in mind.

The duo returns in The King of Fighters XIV to team up with Iori once more since The King of Fighters XIII. After witnessing the possible return of Orochi, they quietly return to the shadows from once they came. In The King of Fighters XV, the two are briefly mentioned in Iori's background story telling him that they would stand back and watch him from the audience this time. They are set to return as downloadable content.

In the 2010 live-action film adaptation of The King of Fighters, Vice is played by Bernice Liu, and Mature by Monique Ganderton.

=== Chizuru Kagura ===
Voiced by: Akito Sato (KOF '96–KOF 2000), Yukiko Sugawa (KOF 2003), Sayaka Ohara (KOFAS onwards)

Chizuru Kagura (神楽 ちづる, Kagura Chizuru) is a member of the Yata clan who holds one of the three sacred artifacts, the Yata Mirror, that originally sealed the serpent monster Orochi eighteen hundred years ago. As the younger heiress of the Yata clan, the other being her older twin sister Maki Kagura, Chizuru was raised as a priestess who maintains the duty of keeping the diligent seal on Orochi intact. One night, Goenitz visited their home and destroyed the seal after killing Maki since the Yata Mirror cannot fight Orochi nor Goenitz's strength alone without the aid of the other two clans. Though in a weaken state, Orochi was released from its seal and Goenitz leaves satisfied. Before her death, Maki passes on the responsibilities of the seal to Chizuru, begging her to bring the three clans together to defeat Orochi. Ten years afterwards, Chizuru becomes a very successful and prestigious businesswoman and the owner of Kagura Enterprises. During this time, she secretly kept track with the King of Fighters tournaments since it began with Geese Howard and comes up with an idea to bringing the clans together. She is playable in The King of Fighters '96, The King of Fighters '97, The King of Fighters 2003 and The King of Fighters XV. In the 2010 live-action film adaptation of The King of Fighters, Chizuru is portrayed by Chinese-Canadian actress Françoise Yip.

=== Goenitz ===
Voiced by: Yoshinori Shima (KOF '96–NGH:US), Susumu Akagi (KOF: D onwards), Hiroki Yasumoto (KOF for Girls)

Goenitz (ゲーニッツ, Gēnittsu) is one of the Four Heavenly Kings of the demon Orochi, with the power to command the element of wind. Goenitz has a very polite personality, reflected in his victory poses and his elegant, somewhat flowery speech. Influenced by Orochi, he sports the messianic attitude that aspires to bring about "salvation" expected from people of religious occupations. During the 1996 tournament, Goenitz discovers that the host Chizuru Kagura plans to gather warriors to seal Orochi and heads to the tournament to stop her. Also, Goenitz is the one who took the villain Rugal Bernstein's right eye in an attempt to grant him the power of Orochi and make him a vessel of his lord. However, Rugal dies after fighting Kyo Kusanagi in The King of Fighters '95, leading Goenitz to target the winner. Following his defeat, Goenitz passes away and his body disappears in a tornado. If the player forms the "Sacred Treasures Team," Goenitz is incinerated by Iori Yagami and Kyo Kusanagi. If Goenitz is chosen by the player, Goenitz is defeated by Chizuru's late sister, Maki, who put a spell on him before her death.

Goenitz appeared as an assistant-type character dubbed "Striker" in The King of Fighters 2000. He returns as an alternative boss in The King of Fighters '98 Ultimate Match and The King of Fighters 2002 Unlimited Match. He is also both a playable character and boss in SNK vs. Capcom: SVC Chaos, and a boss-only character in KOF: Sky Stage. Beating SVC Chaos as Goenitz leads to an ending scene in which Chizuru attacks. A revived Goenitz appears as free downloadable content in The King of Fighters XV.

== Introduced in The King of Fighters '97 ==
=== Chris ===
Voiced by: Rio Ogata (KOF '97–NGH:US), Shiki Aoki (KOFAS), Yuki Sakakibara (KOF for Girls), Rui Yamasaki (KOF XV) (Chris)

A young Swedish boy named Chris (クリス, Kurisu) who utilizes a swift fighting style that relies on quick movements. He enters the tournament alongside Yashiro and Shermie as the innocent-looking drummer of their rock band, CYS. As the competition progresses, the ancient Orochi blood inside him awakens, revealing his true destiny as one of the Four Heavenly Kings and the chosen physical host for Orochi's reincarnation. Despite his gentle and polite demeanor, he harbors a cold, misanthropic streak and willingly sacrifices his own body to serve as the ultimate vessel for the deity's resurrection.

=== Shermie ===
Voiced by: Hazuki Nishikawa (KOF '97–NGH:US), Erina Seto (SNKH:TTF onwards) (Shermie)

A beautiful but shady Frenchwoman named Shermie (シェルミー, Sherumī) who specializes in Joshi puroresu. She initially joins the tournament to support her bandmates and settle a petty grudge against Iori Yagami, keeping her eyes mysteriously hidden behind long bangs. When her hidden Orochi blood awakens, she embraces her dark lineage as one of the Four Heavenly Kings, gaining lethal control over lightning. Driven by absolute loyalty to their master, she ultimately participates in the group's mutual suicide pact to channel their collective energy into Chris for Orochi's rebirth.

=== Yashiro Nanakase ===
Voiced by: Makoto Awane (KOF '97–NGH:US), Keisuke Hamaoka (KOFAS onwards), Megumi Han (Pretty Yashiro; KOFAS), Shinichiro Kamio (KOF for Girls) (Yashiro)

Yashiro Nanakase (七枷 社, Nanakase Yashiro) is a tall Japanese guitar player who utilizes a fighting style that combines powerful strikes with a few aspects of capoeira. They initially enter due to Yashiro's grudge against Iori and his own band (which had overshadowed a performance of theirs before the tournament), but as the tournament progresses, the Orochi blood inside their bodies soon awakens, causing them to remember their status as three of the Four Heavenly Kings. As loyal members of Orochi, they continue to gather power for the awakening until they are forced to kill themselves in order to resurrect Orochi through Chris' body, a concept that began early in the game's production.

=== Shingo Yabuki ===
Voiced by: Takehito Koyasu

Shingo Yabuki (矢吹 真吾 Yabuki Shingo), a high school student who idolizes Kyo and dreams of being able to wield flames, becomes a friend of the team and appears as an edit entry character. During the NESTS saga which began in The King of Fighters '99, Benimaru and Shingo are invited to participate in the tournament. In The King of Fighters 2000, Benimaru forms his own team, the Benimaru Team with Shingo, and two newcomers: Seth, an old friend of Benimaru and a mercenary, and Lin, a Hizoku clan assassin seeking to find a man named Ron. In 2001, Shingo is scouted by Kyo's father Saisyu and becoming the elder Kusanagi's student instead.

=== Orochi ===
Voiced by: Rio Ogata (KOF '97–NGH:US), Motoko Kumai (drama CD's), Shiki Aoki (KOFAS), Rui Yamasaki (KOF XV)

Orochi (オロチ, Orochi) is the final boss of The King of Fighters '97, and can be considered the main antagonist of the series as most villains either serve it or wants to use its powers for their own ends. Its character origin is another interpretation of the mythical eight-headed serpent demon, Yamata no Orochi. In The King of Fighters series, it is a chthonic supernatural being that is the will of Gaia. It has no distinct gender. It does not regard humanity as trustworthy with regard to coexisting with the planet without ravaging it, and so seeks to extinguish humanity. It was sealed 1,800 years ago by the three sacred treasures of Japan. The three clans' descendants are charged with protecting the seal. In The King of Fighters '97, it incarnates in Chris (a herald of Orochi) to save the Gaia.

It is sealed again at the end of the '97 tournament by the three descendants of the users of the three sacred treasures (Kyo, Chizuru and Iori), but the seal is later broken (though not to the point of actually releasing it) by the demon Mukai at the end of The King of Fighters 2003. A clone of Orochi appears as a boss in NeoGeo Battle Coliseum named Mizuchi.

In The King of Fighters XIV, Orochi is one of the many souls inside Verse as shown through Verse's win quote against Kyo and in the ending of Team Yagami, as it lands in Aggtelek-Karst in Hungary, it is sealed away once again due to being in its still weakened state.

=== Yuki ===
Yuki is Kyo Kusanagi's girlfriend and appears in The King of Fighters '97 as a cameo. Revealed as the Kushinada's descendant, the New Faces Team try to sacrifice her to revive Orochi just like in the ancient times. Yuki manages to survive but is not seen in the main titles until The King of Fighters 2000 where it is revealed Kyo hides from her so that the NESTS cartel would use her. She would eventually return in Kyo's ending in The King of Fighters XV. While Kyo's girlfriend Yuki was also created by Morioka out of jealousy, Kuwasashi was against using her in a romantic scene, believing it would not fit the narrative. Yuki would become a more active character in spin-offs including The King of Fighters: Kyo and SNK Gals' Fighters.

== Introduced in The King of Fighters '99 ==
=== K′ ===
Voiced by: Yuuki Matsuda (KOF '99–XIII), Yoshihisa Kawahara (KOF XIV onwards)

=== Maxima ===
Voiced by: Katsuyuki Konishi (most games), Yui Shimodaya (New Maxima; KOFAS)

Maxima (マキシマ, Makishima) debuted as a member of the Hero Team in The King of Fighters '99. He was added to the cast with the desire to add a "somber and reliable middle-aged character" to counteract the introduction of multiple teenage characters. Both he and his former deceased partner Rocky are inspired by two characters of the same names from the 1991 SNK beat 'em up arcade game Robo Army.

Maxima was a Canadian soldier who led a normal life until he found out that his comrade-in-arms Rocky was killed in an incident involving NESTS. To avenge Rocky's death, he abandons his ordinary life. In order to infiltrate the NESTS cartel without being recognized, Maxima was transformed into a cyborg, with his strength and reaction time increased to superhuman levels, built-in weapons, and the ability to conduct instant data analysis. He also has some degree of cyberpathy. He infiltrates NESTS and is assigned to be the partner of K'. They both defect from the cartel after K' encounters his clone, Krizalid, and grows sickened by the organization. Since then, he has become K's steadfast companion and he is often the one who enters both of them into the following tournaments.

=== Whip ===
Voiced by: Shiho Kikuchi

Whip (ウィップ, Wippu) appears in The King of Fighters '99 as the fourth member of the Ikari Team. and once worked for NESTS as an assassin. She is eventually assigned to Heidern's mercenary unit for The King of Fighters tournament to investigate NESTS and the mysterious fighter known only as K'. She was revealed to be a clone of K's deceased sister. Once she realizes who K' is, she reveals their relation to him and joins him in his objective to destroy the NESTS cartel. After the downfall of NESTS, Whip returns to her duties under Heidern's command, while acting as a caring sister figure to both K' and Kula Diamond. One of Whip's moves depicts her shooting her opponents with a Desert Eagle-like handgun. The firearm is edited from the American release of the games in arcades, but is uncensored in the home release versions.

=== Bao ===
Voiced by: Kanako Nakano (KOF '99–2001, KOF 2002:UM)

Bao (包; ch: Bāo; ja: Pao) is a Chinese boy who trains with the Psycho Soldier Team since The King of Fighters '99.

=== Jhun Hoon ===
Voiced by: Kazuya Ichijō

Jhun Hoon (Korean: 전훈 Jeon Hoon, Japanese: ジョン・フーン Jon Fūn) is a childhood friend and rival of Kim Kaphwan. He took notice of Kim's rehabilitation project, and after seeing the ethics and methods of training Chang and Choi, Jhun decides that he would show Kim a more efficient way of management for the criminals by joining the Korea Team as the fourth member for the 1999 and 2000 tournaments. Jhun was absent in the 2001 tournament after he broke his arm while chasing an image of his favorite idol, Athena Asamiya. He later participated in The King of Fighters 2003 with Kim and Chang.

=== Kyo-1 and Kyo-2 ===
Voiced by: Masahiro Nonaka (KOF '99, KOF 2002:UM)

Introduced in The King of Fighters '99, the two Kyo Kusanagi clones are taken from an army created by NESTS following multiple experiments with the kidnapped Kyo. They were given school uniforms due to the original Kyo's iconic popularity as well as different fighting style, with Kyo-1 acting like the classic moveset from KOF '94 who relied on projectiles, while Kyo-2 used mixed kenpo arts alongside his flame like the original Kyo did in KOF '96 . Despite being able to create fire like Kyo, their bodies are unable to properly imitate Kyo's fighting style due to their lack of training.

Both Kyo-1 and Kyo-2 also appeared in The King of Fighters 2002: Unlimited Match.

=== Krizalid ===
Voiced by: Yoshiyuki Iwamoto (KOF '99, KOF 2002:UM), Eiji Yano (KOF 2001), Masahito Kawanago (KOFAS)

Krizalid (クリザリッド, Kurizariddo) acts as the mid and final boss of The King of Fighters '99. He was designed to be a stylish and earnestly strong boss, which ended up being too challenging Krizalid is made to be the ultimate Kyo Kusanagi clone, outfitted with a special suit to feed the data of fighters into his body during battle. He also happens to be a clone of K'. He is ordered to activate thousands of Kyo clones around the world so that they can attack in a simultaneous strike. After being defeated by K', his superior, Clone Zero, neutralizes the Kyo clones and kills Krizalid by throwing a boulder to crush him. He was later revived by Original Zero and fights alongside him in the 2001 tournament. Krizalid also appears in The King of Fighters 2002: Unlimited Match as one of the four final bosses. In The King of Fighters XIV, he is one of the souls inside Verse.

== Introduced in The King of Fighters 2000 ==
=== Kula Diamond ===
Voiced by: Yumi Kakazu

Kula Diamond (クーラ・ダイアモンド, Kūra Daiamondo) is a teenage girl who was experimented on by NESTS in order to exterminate the cartel's traitor, K'. Despite the fact their subject was a mindless puppet with no sign of emotions, the NESTS cartel created an android called Candy Diamond to monitor Kula's behavior and to ensure that she would accomplish her missions. During The King of Fighters 2000, Kula can be fought as a mid-boss during her debut. In the following game, The King of Fighters 2001, Kula enters the fighting tournament with fellow NESTS' agents Foxy, K9999 and Ángel to capture K'. After the collapse of NESTS, Kula becomes a younger sister figure to K', Maxima and Whip.

=== Lin ===
Voiced by: Takaya Kuroda

Lin (Chinese: 麟; Pinyin: Lín; Japanese: 麟 Rin) is one of the new characters introduced in The King of Fighters 2000. A member of the Benimaru Team, Lin is a master of the Poison Hand technique, which enables the user to turn their own blood into venom. He, along with the Hizoku sub-plot, was created without the entire staff's knowledge, leading to some developers being surprised by his team's ending. Lin is a member of the assassination group, The Flying Brigands—or Hizoku (飛賊, Hizoku) clan in Japanese—which is apparently on the brink of ruin. The agent Seth entices him to enter the King of Fighters tournament in order to find their clan's missing leader, Ron. After learning that Ron had defected to NESTS for his personal greed, Lin tracks the activities of NESTS' renegades, K' and his teammates, in hopes of finding his traitorous leader. He joins up with K', Maxima and Whip in the 2001 tournament. After the destruction of NESTS, he continues to search for Ron.

Although he is no longer active in the KOF franchise, Lin's story and character have not been abandoned. For an unexplained reason, he appears next to Ron in the Psycho Soldier Team's ending in The King of Fighters XI.

=== Ron ===
Ron (Chinese: 龍; Pinyin: Lóng; Japanese: 龍(ロン) Ron) is first introduced as a sub-plot character in The King of Fighters 2000 before appearing as a Striker for Original Zero in The King of Fighters 2001. Though he is not playable in the franchise, he serves as an important side-story character. According to his official profile, his main objective is to gain the ability to manipulate the dead. He is the former leader of an elite assassination group known as the Flying Brigands—or Hizoku (飛賊, Hizoku) clan in Japanese—and the father to a number of their members, including Duo Lon and Xiao Lon. Ron betrayed the Hizoku clan by joining the NESTS cartel for personal gain, labeling himself as a traitor to many of the group's members, including Lin, his former pupil.

After the collapse of NESTS, he reveals his great interest in a mysterious power shared by Sie Kensou and Bao known as the Dragon Spirit. In the Psycho Soldier Team's ending in The King of Fighters XI, Ron compliments Kensou for controlling the Dragon Spirit and is looking forward to fight against him in the future.

=== Vanessa ===
Voiced by: Kaori Minami (KOF 2000–XI), Mayumi Hata (KOF XIV onwards)

Vanessa (ヴァネッサ, Vanessa) first appeared as a Striker in The King of Fighters '99: Evolution before making her debut as a playable character in The King of Fighters 2000. Like Maxima, she was created as a middle-aged female to contrast the multiple teenage characters in the roster. Vanessa is a normal housewife who discreetly serves as a mercenary agent. Working under the orders of Commander Ling, Vanessa and fellow agent Seth are commissioned with the job of joining Ling's KOF tournament to follow the footsteps of the NESTS cartel. The two agents part from one another, with Vanessa recruiting prime suspects K', Maxima, and Ramón to complete their team. Her objective from then on is to observe the activities of the NESTS defectors, based on Ling's orders. In The King of Fighters XI, Vanessa enters the tournament alongside Blue Mary and Ramón under orders to receive information concerning the broken Orochi seal and the mysterious members of Those from the Past.

=== Ramón ===
Voiced by: Eiji Takemoto (KOF 2000–XI), Kiyoshi Katsunuma (KOF XIV onwards)

Ramón (ラモン) makes his first appearance in The King of Fighters 2000 as a member of the game's Hero Team. Ramón is the only character to speak Spanish in the game, and was created to appeal to the Latin American fanbase. He has a fighting style primarily based on lucha libre. Ramón is a famous luchador known as "El Diablo Amarillo" (The Yellow Devil), who is loved by his fans in the wrestling circle. He is approached by an agent named Vanessa, who requests in his cooperation in forming a team for The King of Fighters 2000 tournament. Since then, he has had a one-sided infatuation with Vanessa. After the 2000 tournament, he continues to team up with Vanessa at her request, often along with Seth.

Years later, Ramón becomes the leader of Team Mexico, a wrestler team in KOF XIV consisting of himself, the former NESTS agent Ángel, and Tizoc (from Garou: Mark of the Wolves). He formed the team during vacation, where he helps Ángel out in reforming her life and also helps Tizoc out in convincing and disguising him as a heel wrestler known as the "King of Dinosaurs" due to Tizoc's humiliating loss at the hands of Argentine boxer Nelson. In KOF XV, Antonov replaces Ángel by joining up with Ramón and Tizoc, with Antonov himself leading a second wrestler team known as Team G.A.W. (Galaxy Anton Wrestling).

=== Seth ===
Voiced by: Hidetoshi Nakamura

Seth (セス, Sesu) first appeared as a Striker in The King of Fighters '99: Evolution before making his debut as a playable character in The King of Fighters 2000. He was created along with Vanessa, though Seth became the visual model for her. Developers wished to have a character with "the powerful image of a big, dark, middle-aged man with a Mohawk haircut".

Seth was ordered by his superior Ling to enter the King of Fighters tournament in order to capture the Flying Brigands (Hizoku) leader, Ron. To do this, he arranges to work with Benimaru Nikaido, Shingo Yabuki and Lin. During the tournament, Seth learns that Ling is really Zero in disguise, and that Ron had joined with NESTS. He continues to investigate Ron's activities as the series progresses.

=== Hinako Shijou ===
Voiced by: Ayako Kawasumi (KOF 2000–2003), Akane Tamura (KOF XV onwards)

Hinako Shijou (四条 雛子, Shijō Hinako) is a young sumo fighter who makes her first appearance in The King of Fighters 2000 as a fourth member of the Women Fighters Team.

=== Clone Zero ===
Voiced by: Kinta Futogane (KOF 2000–2002:UM), Jiro Saito (KOFAS), Kaya Okuno (Pretty Zero; KOFAS)

Zero (ゼロ) is one of the higher-ranked agents of NESTS and the final boss in The King of Fighters 2000. The designer, C.A.C. Yamasaki, admits basing Zero off a certain character from the manga Fist of the North Star. Zero begins to secretly build his own weapon from NESTS' technology called the "Zero Cannon". He sets his plans into motion in the 2000 tournament. There, he impersonates a military commander named Ling and uses his persona as a decoy to stop the military resistance against him. Depending on whether or not the player defeats Kula, his plans are foiled by either Heidern or Kula, who is sent to execute him for his treacherous acts. While dying, he tells Whip of who she really was, angering her to shoot him dead.

Clone Zero also appears in The King of Fighters 2002: Unlimited Match as one of the four final bosses.

== Introduced in The King of Fighters 2001 ==
=== Foxy ===
Voiced by: Haruna Ikezawa

Foxy (フォクシー, Fokushī) is an expert fencer and a loyal member of the NESTS organization who, alongside fellow fencer Diana, acts as a guardian and mother figure to Kula Diamond. She first appeared as an alternative "Striker" in KOF 2000 before making her debut as a playable character in The King of Fighters 2001, where she is a member of the NESTS Team alongside Kula, K9999 and Ángel.

=== K9999 / Krohnen ===
Voiced by: Nozomu Sasaki (KOF 2001–2002), Kenn (KOF XV onwards)

K9999 (pronounced Kay Four-Nine) is a hotheaded, psychopathic member of the NESTS organization who debuted in The King of Fighters 2001. His design was based entirely on Tetsuo Shima from Akira. Due to copyright issues, K9999 was removed from The King of Fighters 2002: Unlimited Match in 2009; he was replaced by a new character called Nameless. He would later be re-introduced in The King of Fighters XV as Krohnen McDougall (クローネン・マクドガル, Kurōnen Makudogaru).

=== Ángel ===
Voiced by: Miina Tominaga (KOF 2001), Mayumi Shintani (KOF 2002), Miki Ogura (KOF XIV onwards)

=== May Lee ===
May Lee Jinju (メイ・リー, Mei Rī) is a perky teenager and taekwondo student who admires Kim Kaphwan and his team. She debuted in The King of Fighters 2001 as a member of the Korea Team, replacing Jhun Hoon, who broke his right arm while chasing an image of his idol, Athena Asamiya. May Lee is unique for having the ability to change between Standard Mode and Hero Mode.

=== Original Zero ===
Voiced by: Toshimitsu Arai (KOF 2001–2002:UM), Taiten Kusunoki (KOFAS)

The Zero in KOF 2000 was revealed to be a clone of the Original Zero (ゼロ(オリジナル), Zero (Orijinaru)), who appears as the sub-boss in The King of Fighters 2001. He was created because the supervising designer of his character claimed to be dissatisfied with Clone Zero's design in 2000. Unlike his clone, Original Zero is extremely loyal to the NESTS syndicate, and was disgusted to learn of his clone's attempted coup d'état. Willing to clear the reputation of his clone's actions, Original Zero is ordered to destroy the winners of KOF tournament. He traps the winning team in a space ship that was disguised as a blimp. After he is defeated, he urges the team to escape the collapsing ship and dies honorably on board the vessel. His true loyalty is toward Igniz's father, Nests, with Original Zero himself unaware of Igniz's sudden betrayal on his own father. Original Zero also appears in The King of Fighters 2002: Unlimited Match as one of the four final bosses.

=== Igniz ===
Voiced by: Norio Wakamoto (KOF 2001–2002:UM), Masafumi Kimura (KOFAS)

Igniz (イグニス, Igunisu) is the final boss in The King of Fighters 2001. His handsome and youthful appearance was specifically created at the sponsors' request. Although Igniz had served his father, the previous leader of NESTS also named Nests with utmost loyalty, he had secretly sought to overthrow him and become the new leader of the organization, seizing the opportunity to do so near the end of the 2001 tournament, in which NESTS was hosting. Igniz decides to test his newly acquired power against the finalists in the hopes of crushing them and becoming a new god. Following his defeat K', Igniz attempts to destroy the planet by plummeting NESTS' main headquarters out of orbit but dies as Kula Diamond protects the area. Igniz also appears in The King of Fighters 2002: Unlimited Match as one of the four final bosses. In The King of Fighters XIV, he is one of the souls inside Verse.

== Introduced in The King of Fighters 2002 ==
=== Kusanagi ===
Kusanagi is a clone of Kyo Kusanagi in The King of Fighters 2002 and The King of Fighters 2002: Unlimited Match. The series' protagonist Kyo Kusanagi remained popular within fans after the NESTS story arc which resulted in the team's decision to create a clone of him, Kusanagi, wearing his highschool uniform which the original Kyo dropped in KOF '99. While the game gives Kusanagi no narrative like the other characters, Kusanagi would be given a backstory in The King of Fighters 2003, where he is revealed to be a creation of Chizuru Kagura meant to test the participants in the new tournament. He is voiced by Mitsuo Iwata.

=== Nameless ===
Voiced by: Daisuke Ono

Nameless (ネームレス, Nēmuresu) is a new character who appeared in The King of Fighters 2002: Unlimited Match as a single entry character and mid-boss. He is a clone of both K' and Kyo Kusanagi; his white hair on the left reflects the former, while his brown hair on the right reflects the latter. Nameless fights with two types of pyrokinetic abilities while equipped with an Anti-K glove created from the DNA of his deceased lover Isolde, who resembles Kula Diamond.

== Introduced in The King of Fighters 2003 ==
=== Adelheid and Rose ===
Voiced by: Tetsuya Tanaka (Adelheid Bernstein)
Voiced by: Kazuyo Inosako (Rose Bernstein)

Adelheid (アーデルハイド, Āderuhaido), along with his younger sister, Rose (ローズ, Rōzu), are the only known children of Rugal Bernstein. They reside in an airship called "Sky Noah". Adel is a boss character in The King of Fighters 2003, as well as a secret character and mid-boss in The King of Fighters XI. They were added to the series to create an alternate story to the main plot.

Despite sharing several physical and fighting traits with Rugal, Adelheid is an honorable fighter who exhibits good sportsmanship. Rose, however, was developed to be extremely prideful and selfish, possessing her father's negative traits. At the end of KOF XI, Rose is manipulated by Botan, a member of the mysterious group Those from the Past, to use her in their plans, leading to the events of The King of Fighters XIII. Adelheid also had a friendly conversation with Heidern, Rugal's mortal enemy.

=== Duo Lon ===
Voiced by: Tsunehito Maruo (KOF 2003–XIII), Keisuke Kōmoto (KOF XV) (Japanese); Josh Keller (KOF XII) (English)

Duo Lon (Chinese: 堕瓏; Pinyin: Duòlóng; Japanese: デュオロン Dyuoron) makes his first appearance in The King of Fighters 2003 as a member of the game's Hero Team. His overall look was based on anime title character Vampire Hunter D. Information on his design graph revealed that he is one of the nine children of Ron, an assassin who chased after his own father.

Duo Lon is a member of the assassin group, the Flying Brigands—or Hizoku (飛賊, Hizoku))—and the half-brother of Xiao Lon. Hoping to hunt down the clan's traitor, Ron, he agrees to enter the KOF 2003 tournament with his acquaintances, Ash Crimson and Shen Woo. However, after discovering Ash's true objectives, he teams up with Elisabeth Blanctorche and Benimaru Nikaido in The King of Fighters XI.

=== Shen Woo ===
Voiced by: Kōji Suizu

Shen Woo (シェン・ウー, Shen Ū; Chinese: 神武; pinyin: Shén Wǔ; Shanghainese: Wu Chinese pronunciation: [z̥əɲ˨˧v̥v̩ʷ˦], lit. "Divine Warrior") is one of the members of the Hero Team in The King of Fighters 2003, alongside Ash Crimson and Duo Lon. He was first conceptualized to be a "wild and sexy man", and due to his fighting style revolving around punches, designers for his fighting style had to make his attacks distinctive enough to avoid confusion with Ralf Jones and Yashiro Nanakase. As "Shanghai's God of War", Shen was raised in the city of Shanghai in eastern China, and given that nickname for developing his own, devastating street-fighting boxing style that is best described as "violent". Eventually, he came to know and befriended both the enigmatic fighter Ash Crimson and the Chinese assassin Duo Lon, with the trio forming together as the Hero Team for the KOF 2003 tournament. At the end of The King of Fighters XI, Ash decides to pit his two teammates against each other by convincing Oswald to defeat Shen Woo for the mention of the "Dragon Pills" made by anonymous pharmacists in Shanghai, telling Oswald that they will only give the Dragon Pills to someone who could defeat their mortal enemy, which is Shen himself.

=== Malin ===
Voiced by: Kazuyo Inosako

Malin (まりん, Marin) is a character who debuted in The King of Fighters 2003 as a member of the High School Girls Team, alongside Athena Asamiya and Hinako Shijou. Her addition to the series was due to Choi's absence in the game where she first appeared. The game producers state that her name should be spelled "Malin" and not "Marin", adding that "this is the humble preference of the supervising designer and a mystery to us all". In The King of Fighters XI, Malin becomes a member of the Anti-Kyokugenryu Team (alongside Kasumi Todoh and Eiji Kisaragi) due to her animosity towards the fighting style's practitioner Yuri Sakazaki.

=== Mukai ===
Voiced by: Toshihiro Shigetsuka

Mukai (ムカイ; also written as 無界) is the hidden final boss in The King of Fighters 2003. Mukai's primary power is his control over many things related to stone. He speaks in very pious, grandiose declarations, but appears to have a cautious attitude toward the potential of humans. Mukai appears in The King of Fighters 2003 tournament, seeking strong opponents to test his strength against them. Mukai reveals that his group had organized the tournament so that they could break the Orochi seal and give its power to the group's unknown leader. Mukai wanted to battle against the winning team of the tournament, seeing if they had what it takes to survive in "the new age". Mukai was defeated, but manages to escape. He would later return in The King of Fighters XIII, but is killed by Saiki after disobeying his boss.

== Introduced in The King of Fighters XI ==
=== Elisabeth Blanctorche ===
Voiced by: Kayoko Oshima (KOF XI–XIII), Shizuka Itō (KOFAS onwards)

Elisabeth Blanctorche (エリザベート・ブラントルシュ, Erizabēto Burantorushu) (spelled "Elisabeth Branctorche" in The King of Fighters XII) is one of three original characters debuting in The King of Fighters XI. Her initial character concept was to be the rival to Ash Crimson, though developers decided to change her into a "leading lady" character. The developers also describe her fighting style as "orthodox with subtle tricks [to it]" despite her minimal moveset. Elisabeth forms the Rival Team with Benimaru Nikaido and Duo Lon to France, in order to stop Ash Crimson, whom she scolds for seeming to forsake their mission. In The King of Fighters XIII, Elisabeth now leads a team with Ash's former teammates Duo Lon and Shen Woo, effectively forming what seems to be the new Hero Team. Though she does not participate in The King of Fighters XIV, Elisabeth enlists Kukri's help in finding Ash following the defeat of Verse, with the two succeeding in their mission as Ash's body is located in Ukraine's Carpathian Mountains with his soul burning inside it, thus confirming Ash's return to the living world much to Elisabeth's rejoice. In order to help investigate and solve the unknown crisis which seems to involve newcomers Shun'ei and Isla, Elisabeth and Kukri join forces with a fully recovered Ash for The King of Fighters XV.

=== Oswald ===
Voiced by: Toshihiro Shigetsuka

Oswald (オズワルド, Ozuwarudo) appears in The King of Fighters XI as a member of the Hero Team, alongside Ash Crimson and Shen Woo. He is a veteran poker player and professional assassin from Ireland who utilizes the Karnöffel assassination art, a card-based fighting style in attacking his opponents with razor-sharp cards. Oswald was created as an elderly gentleman, and is an enigma to even the creators. He was originally intended to be the "good-looking glasses" character for the series. It is revealed at the end of the tournament that Oswald joins Ash and Shen Woo to obtain money and drugs named Dragon Pills. Ash agrees to give information regarding the drug to Oswald, explaining that it can only be given to him if he defeats the provider's enemy, Shen Woo. Oswald would later make his return as a DLC character in The King of Fighters XIV.

=== Momoko ===
Voiced by: Kazuyo Inosako

Momoko (桃子, Momoko) is a young capoeira girl with psychic powers. She is a third member of the Neo Psycho Soldier Team in The King of Fighters XI, alongside Athena Asamiya and Sie Kensou. She is the first capoeira fighter in the KOF series. The staff had mixed opinions about Momoko due to her relatively young age.

=== Shion ===
Voiced by: Jidai 'Tokiyo' Ogawa

Shion (紫苑, Shion) is the sub-boss in The King of Fighters XI. His character was conceptually designed to be one of Ron's daughters, though developers decided to change his gender to startle and appeal to fans with his androgynous appearance. Shion is an enigmatic character whose past is unknown. He works as an underling for the demon Magaki, and seems knowledgeable about the workings of Orochi. After being defeated at the ruins of the tournament finals, Shion is dragged through an extradimensional gate. However, after Magaki is defeated at the end of the tournament, Shion's spear kills him and his whereabouts remain unknown. In a KOF XIII cutscene, the head of Shion's spear appears, indicating that he is still alive as Shion appeared before Shroom and Rimelo.

=== Magaki ===
Voiced by: Spicy Yagi

Magaki (禍忌) is the final boss in The King of Fighters XI. Nothing much is known about Magaki and his past history. Like his partner Mukai, Magaki wants to awake Orochi and give Orochi's powers to his own master. He shows even less respect for humans in general, believing them to have little-to-no potential, and being weak overall. He also seems to have very little tolerance for not getting what he wants from others. Like Mukai before him, he stood up after being defeated, apparently unscathed, and made his exit into another realm after saying perhaps it was more than spirit that was needed to awaken Orochi. However, as he finally realizes the error in his plan, Magaki is killed by Shion's spear, hurled from the dimensional rift he was escaping from.

== Introduced in The King of Fighters XIII ==
=== Saiki ===
Voiced by: Sōnosuke Nagashiro

Saiki (斎祀) is the main antagonist of The King of Fighters XIII, being revealed as the leader of Those From the Past while serving as the sub-boss of the game. He is able to control the flow of time due to a gate that can halt the timeline so long as it is open. During the game's cutscenes, he takes the appearance of a human, very similar to Ash Crimson. Before taking on the player's team, Saiki drains Mukai of his power after the latter disobeys a direct order, transforming into a red demonic being. After the battle, Ash takes his power, seemingly killing him. This plan backfires as Ash ends up being possessed by Saiki and turns into a shadowed version of himself called Evil Ash to act as the game's final boss. During the ending, Saiki is defeated, but tries to use the gate to rewind time again in an attempt to restart his plot once more; Ash stands in his way and prevents his passage. When the gate closes, Saiki is finally killed, but it is revealed that he is Ash's ancestor, thus by denying Saiki passage into the past, Ash forces his own existence to cease.

== Introduced in The King of Fighters XIV ==
=== Shun'ei ===
Voiced by: Takashi Ōhara

First appearing in The King of Fighters XIV, the team consists of Shun'ei, a fighter who wields hydrokinesis in a form of a claw on his right side of his body and pyrokinesis in a form of a fist on his left side of his body, Tung Fu Rue, the legendary master of Hakkyokuseiken who had debuted in Fatal Fury. During the tournament finals, Shun'ei learns that he possesses a fragment of Verse's power, which causes Verse to go after Shun'ei. After Verse is defeated, the team returns to the Wudang Mountains where Shun'ei tells his teammates that Kyo advised him to continue his training to keep his powers under control to which Shun'ei vows to train harder.

=== Meitenkun ===
Voiced by: Seira Ryu

Meitenkun is a young fighter who is always holding a pillow and is very sleepy. Despite having little knowledge of the King of Fighters, Tung convinces Shun'ei and Meitenkun to enter the tournament as a means for them to face off against renowned martial artists from around the world. In addition, Tung saw the tournament as an opportunity to reunite with the Bogard brothers and meet Kyo Kusanagi, the latter after his father Saisyu requested the Japan Team to help Tung's students with their training.

=== Official Invitation Team ===
Voiced by: Mio (Sylvie Paula Paula)
Voiced by: Hiroki Takahashi (Kukri)
Voiced by: AYUKA (Mian)

The 'Official Invitation Team is composed of characters that Antonov personally invited to participate in his tournament. First appearing in The King of Fighters XIV, the team consists of Sylvie Paula Paula, a remnant of NESTS who wields electromagnetic powers, Kukri, a mysterious fighter from North Africa (presumably Mali) who utilizes sand-based fighting techniques while hiding his face with a hood at all times, and Mian, a Sichuan opera dancer and fighter. Prior to the tournament, each member lives in the underground society with Mian and Sylvie often taking part in underground tournaments together. During the end of the final match, Kukri reveals that he is familiar with Verse, especially since half its power lies within Shun'ei. When the tournament ends, Kukri leaves his teammates and Antonov behind and travels to the Carpathian Mountains in Ukraine where he finds Ash Crimson. Kukri is soon joined by Elisabeth Blanctorche, revealing that she had hired Kukri to enter the tournament to find and rescue Ash whose soul resided inside Verse. It is revealed in The King of Fighters XV that Kukri’s cynical attitude had been originating from the death of his master and adopted mother Dolores, who had sacrificed her life to save him after the former had suddenly awakened his sand power while being unable to initially control it at first. Although he did find Ash for Elisabeth, he still wasn't able to find Dolores elsewhere until he became relieved to learn of his master’s revival while watching her interview for the next KOF tournament on television. Back when Kukri was adopted by Dolores, he had learned the existence of Amplified Specters, the same multiversal-based power that Shun'ei inherited from Verse, which Kukri initially disbelieved at first.

Kukri is the main antagonist of a spin-off sequel SNK Heroines: Tag Team Frenzy, in which Kukri himself kidnaps and sends most of the female participants from the XIV tournament into his personal pocket dimension.

=== Gang-Il ===
Voiced by: Toshiya Fujisawa

Gang-Il is Kim Kaphwan's master.

=== Luong ===
Voiced by: Chika Kino

Luong is introduced as a member of Team Kim.

=== Hein ===
Voiced by: Naoki Sagawa

Hein was introduced as a member of Team South Town.

=== South America Team ===
Voiced by: Kengo Takanashi (Nelson)
Voiced by: Ayumi Fujimura (Zarina)
Voiced by: Eiji Miyashita (Bandeiras)

The South America Team is composed of characters originating from South America. First appearing in The King of Fighters XIV, the team consists of Nelson, a boxer with a robotic prosthetic left arm after losing his arm in a terrible accident, Zarina, a Samba dancer whose fighting style resembles capoeira, and Bandeiras Hattori, an obsessed fanboy of ninjas who trained himself to become one, and the founder of the “Brazilian Ninja Arts Dojo.” Prior to the tournament, Nelson defeated Tizoc in a contest that left him in disgrace, with the latter adopting a heel persona called “King of Dinosaurs.”

Each member had their own reason for entering the tournament. Nelson wants to seize victory in the tournament while hoping that his fiancée Liccia will awake from her coma, Zarina wants to win the prize money to procure land as a nesting place for her pet Coco, a toucan and its species, and Bandeiras hopes that his participation and fighting style will bring in students to his dojo. While the South America Team didn't win, they saw good fortune coming out of the tournament when Liccia awakes from her coma, Zarina convinces Antonov to help procure land for Coco after he already purchased much of the land for one of his businesses (she gleefully admits that she simply kicked him in the crotch instead for his aid), and Bandeiras travels to Japan to advertise his dojo. However, he ends up getting arrested by police for causing a scene. Before seeing Liccia in the hospital, Nelson stops by at his arm's manufacturer for a checkup, completely unaware that the scientists who gave him the cybernetic left arm were responsible for his accident, and are attempting to use him as a test subject for an unknown purpose.

=== Antonov ===
Voiced by: Moriyuki Hishida

Antonov (アントノフ, Antonofu; Антонов) is a Russian billionaire and the president of his own company, the Antonov Corporation. After being reinvigorated for his love of fighting, he purchases the rights to the King of Fighters brand despite objections from the board members of his company, and announces a new King of Fighters tournament. Proclaiming himself as the “first champion”, he sends out invitations across the world, challenging old and new teams to take his "KOF" championship belt away from him. After the incident caused by Verse at the climax of KOF XIV, the resulting lawsuits had cost Antonov nearly all of his money and damaged his reputation, causing him to briefly disappear from the public. In order to help restore his reputation, Antonov decides to form his own wrestling team named Galaxy Anton Wrestling and is prepared to take part in KOF XV as the leader of Team G.A.W. alongside Mexican wrestlers Ramón and King of Dinosaurs.

=== Verse ===
Voiced by: Yusaku

Verse (バース, Bāsu) is the main antagonist and final boss in The King of Fighters XIV. An evil presence who embodies one of the Amplified Specters that is sensed across reality, time, and space, various fighters from the tournament join to stop him. Within his being, he holds the souls of deceased fighters from the past tournaments such as Goenitz, Yashiro Nanakase, Shermie, Chris, Orochi, and Ash Crimson along with Gaidel, Krizalid, Original Zero, Igniz, and Rugal Bernstein, as well as Mizuki Rashojin from Samurai Shodown II, Kukri's adoptive mother Dolores and many more. The existence of Verse was the result of Ash changing his timeline to erase himself from being Saiki's descendant and killing his ancestor in the process, this being the reason of why Nakoruru travels to the present in order to help fix the timeline. Not only that, one of Verse's fragments is also implanted inside the young Shun'ei, leaving his parents to abandon him secretly due to this, though he was later rescued by Tung Fu Rue, who had decided to raise him as his last disciple. According to Geese Howard, the appearance of Verse was foretold in the Sacred Scrolls of Jin.

In a manga adaption of XIV titled The King of Fighters: A New Beginning, once Verse gathers enough essences from the previous matches, including one which were outside the ring, he is confronted and defeated by Geese, who interrupts the recent official matches, using its power to assume his Nightmare form in order to fight alongside Billy and Hein against the China and Fatal Fury Teams while also summoning the deceased Four Heavenly Kings and NESTS executives to dispose of the other teams, including Nakoruru’s summoned Samurai Shodown warriors.

== Introduced in The King of Fighters XV ==
=== Isla ===
Voiced by: Lynn

Isla is a Chilean graphic artist who utilizes a multiversal Specter power similar to Shun'ei's. She is introduced as the leader of Team Rival in KOF XV.

=== Dolores ===
Voiced by: Yūko Kaida

=== Re Verse ===
Voiced by: Lynn

=== Otoma=Raga ===
Voiced by: Unknown

== Reception ==
Ever since the original The King of Fighers '94, the protagonist Kyo Kusanagi became one of Japan's most popular fighting game characters, while other SNK characters who act as guest like Mai Shiranui from Fatal Fury and Athena Asamiya from Psycho Soldier were popular. IGN said that while the first game's story was fun, Kyo's subplot about finding his father dead and fighting the final boss Rugal Bernstein as the saddest event from the game. Iori's debut in the next game was popular not only for his characterization but also rivalry with Kyo. Following games were popular for exploring a narrative highly elaborated in The King of Fighters '96 where Kyo, his rival Iori and newcomer Chizuru Kagura join forces to defeat a threat, the demon Orochi and their servants based on Japanese mythology. In the book Gaming Cultures and Place in Asia-Pacific, Kyo was regarded as one of the most popular video game characters in Hong Kong from the mid-1990s onward alongside Iori and Mai, among others, to the point of overshadowing the Street Fighter characters who were also largely well-known. The King of Fighters '97 stood out for ending the first story arc where Iori and Leona Heidern are given cursed versions as boss characters. while Nintendo World Report called Kyo's final fight against the main antagonist, Orochi, an "epic and heroic battle".

Following the Orochi arc, Retronauts recalled that Kyo and Iori being removed from The King of Fighters '99 was shocking upon release which led to their eventual return as hidden due to negative feedback. 1UP.com praised the NESTS arc protagonist K' as among the most inspired new character designs in The King of Fighters series since Iori Yagami's debut in The King of Fighters '95 based on design and fighting style. MeriStation enjoyed the NESTS arc for focusing on a new set of characters related to the previous lead as Kyo Kusanagi's DNA resulted in the new ones having multiple similarities. Chris Moyse from Destructoid said while some SNK fans looked down on the narrative of the NESTS arc due to the explotation of Kyo Kusanagi clones as well as multiple Star Wars similarities, they still appreciate several of such clones with Kula being a major example of them among other test subjects such as K'. In regards to the Ash saga, Destructoid writer Jonathan Holmes praised Ash's character as "defying traditional gender roles while kicking some ass" and called him "the perfect mascot for the KoF series as a whole."

For the New Age arc, DashFight said that Shun'ei was an innovative protagonist in the series for having a more softspoken personality but also an arc involving a power he has yet to control, allowing him to complement other KOF protagonists as well as guests from other IPs. Excite said that while Kyo stopped being the series' protagonist, he remains a strong narrative figure, earning him the title of "honorary protagonist of the KOF series for life!" in The King of Fighters XV. Besides main cast, The King of Fighters XV appealed for bringing back the first KOF boss Rugal, as well as the Garou: Mark of the Wolves protagonist Rock Howard. TheGamer had mixed feelings about using Geese Howard as the character originally dies in the 1995 fighting game Real Bout Fatal Fury which seems to be a trend in modern gaming when it came to reviving dead villains. In 2025, SNK made a poll involving the best The King of Fighters characters which Kyo took first place.
