= Leona Heidern =

- The King of Fighters character
- Leona by Eisuke Ogura
- First game: The King of Fighters '96 (1996)
- Voiced by: Masae Yumi (KOF '96–KOF XIII); Seiko Yoshida (KOF XIV onwards)

In-universe information
- Fighting style: Martial arts + Heidern style of assassination arts
- Family: Heidern (adopted father)

Leona (Japanese: レオナ, Hepburn: Reona), also known as Leona Heidern (Japanese: レオナ・ハイデルン, Hepburn: Reona Haiderun) is a fictional character from SNK's The King of Fighters series of fighting video games. Leona is introduced in The King of Fighters '96 as the adopted daughter of another character, Heidern. Leona suffers from a curse known as Riot of the Blood (血の暴走, Chi no Bōsō; lit. "Rampage of Blood") that causes her to become berserk. She often takes the nicknames Orochi Leona (暴走レオナ, Bousou Reona; lit. "Rampaging Leona") and "Awakened Orochi Blood from the Darkness Leona" (ヤミノナカオロチノチニメザメルレオナ, Yami no naka Orochi no Chi ni Mezameru Reona; lit. "Insane Leona with Blood of Orochi Awakened within the Darkness"). The character has also appeared in multiple spin-off games and other media, some of which also feature her Orochi form.

Leona was created by SNK to replace Heidern, her superior in the story. Leona's design was intended to contrast with previous SNK heroines, which led to her silent personality. Leona has been voiced by Masae Yumi and Seiko Yoshida.

Critical reception to Leona's character has been mostly positive, with journalists enjoying her backstory, movesets and her Orochi form. Her relationship with her superior and adoptive father Heidern was praised as a result of similar moves and impact in the storyline.

== Creation and design ==
Early designs of Leona by Falcoon used to show the character with less revealing outfits until The King of Fighters XII.

Leona Heidern debuted in The King of Fighters (KOF) series in The King of Fighters '96 (KOF '96) as a replacement for Heidern. She was introduced as his adopted daughter. The details of her origins gradually came to include a crucial role as a descendant of the Orochi tribe. Leona's special moves were designed to be unique and reveal the tastes of her designers. SNK noted there were multiple conceptions that Leona's complete name is Leona Heidern as a result of being under Heidern's care but they stated that it was only a codename and her only name is Leona.

Shinkiro, an illustrator who worked on KOF, considered Leona with her "ice queen" persona an opposite of Mai Shiranui, another popular female character featuring in the series. SNK artist Falcoon stated that Leona is the company's response to Street Fighter character Cammy; both of whom are implosion assassins. While never used for fights, SNK provided Leona with a secretary outfit Falcoon found stylish. Fellow Ikari Team member Whip was originally meant to be introduced in KOF '96 but the importance of Leona in the story led to her exclusion until The King of Fighters '99. Leona's and Whip's designs were meant to contrast one another. Character designer Nao Q also named Leona as his favorite character.

While most of Leona's moves are inherited from Heidern, they also possess unique expressiveness. This includes dance-like, chaotic super move "Gravity Storm," and a one-hit kill "Spinning Spark".

Standing 176 centimetres (5 ft 9 1/2 in) tall and with measurements of 84-60-87 cm (33-24-34 in), Leona's design has been altered since her debut. Falcoon gave her an alternative skin in Maximum Impact 2, in which she wears Heidern's clothing, including her eyepatch. Another outfit is a reference to Neon Genesis Evangelion character Rei Ayanami. Her most recent design was completed by Eisuke Ogura for The King of Fighters XIV. For the spinoff game SNK Heroines: Tag Team Frenzy, The King of Fighters XIV producer Yasuyuki Oda had recommended Leona alongside Yuri Sakazaki as playable characters for newcomers. Oda added that Leona's characterization was meant to make the story of the spin-off more comical as a result of her stoic traits.

The popularity of Iori Yagami's berserker form inspired the idea of Leona entering into her own alter ego. The team liked this form and added multiple aspects to her introductions that would make both Orochi Leona and Orochi Iori appear threatening in The King of Fighters '97, in which Leona is revealed in the arcade run.

The character has been voiced by Masae Yumi and Seiko Yoshida.

== Appearances ==
Leona is a playable character in most of the KOF games. Leona makes her debut in SNK's KOF '96 as a new member of the Ikari Team alongside her superiors Clark Still and Ralf Jones. As a child, Leona was cursed by a priest named Goenitz with Orochi's curse, which is also known as the Riot of the Blood (血の暴走, Chi no Bōsō; lit. "Rampage of Blood"). The curse caused her to go berserk and murder several people, including her own family. In the next game, KOF '97, Leona's curse causes her to become a boss character if not used by the player. Following her and the demon Orochi's defeat, Leona regrets her actions and attempts to end her life but Ralf stops her. Her Orochi form returns in the remake of The King of Fighters '98 (Ultimate Match) and as an assistant character in The King of Fighters 2000.

In KOF '99, KOF 2000, and KOF 2001, Leona investigates the NESTS cartel. In KOF 2003, Leona loses control over her inner demon, and beats up Ralf and Clark. This causes her to retire from the tournament The King of Fighters XI, and tries to control her power until KOF XIII and KOF XIV, when she returns to the tournament.

Leona has also appeared in spinoff games. Both King of Fighters R-1 and King of Fighters R-2 feature Leona and her berserker form as playable characters. KOF R-2 includes her as a teamless character. She is also present in the storyless game The King of Fighters: Neowave and The King of Fighters EX2. Leona is also present in spinoff games SNK Gals' Fighters and SNK Heroines: Tag Team Frenzy. In her ending in SNK Heroines, Leona has a nightmare in which her Orochi powers force her to defeat all of her allies. She also appeared as a playable skin in Mobile Legends: Bang Bang as a collaboration with SNK, in the crossover SNK vs. Capcom: The Match of the Millennium, and appeared as a guest in Metal Slug XX.

Other games that include Leona and her Orochi form include The King of Fighters All Star, Kimi wa Hero and The King of Fighters '98 Ultimate Match Online. She also appears in the action-shooting cellphone game Ikari - Leona Gekitohen alongside Ralf and Clark, as well as The King of Fighters: Destiny. In the visual novel Days of Memories, she is unplayable and simply a cameo character.

Besides games, Leona has appeared in the manga The King of Fighters: Kyo during a mission in which the player, in control of Kyo Kusanagi, meets Leona and can recruit her into his team. The manga was later published as a visual novel. She also appears in the manga The King of Fighters G reprising her role from KOF '96. In the manga The King of Fighters: A New Beginning, Leona suffers from the Riot of the Blood curse but is able to control it when facing former NESTS agent Angel. She makes a brief appearance in The King of Fighters: Another Day, investigating K' and Maxima's actions.

== Critical reception ==
Leona's character received positive comments especially for her traits and movements. Hardcore Gaming 101 regarded Leona as one of the most suitable additions to the franchise in KOF '96 for the way she mimics Heidern's techniques while being stronger. The handling of her techniques was noted to be balanced across the series while her character was noted to have an outstanding role in the narrative involving Goenitz and other servants of the demon Orochi.

ThunderBoltGames liked the character's introduction and said her fighting style is one of the most notable changes from KOF '96. The removal of blood from her attacking combos in the English versions of KOF 2000, KOF 2001, and the first Maximum Impact drew negative comments from IGN.

Den of Geek compared Leona with the ideal child of the superheroes Hulk and Black Widow because of their similarities in abilities and their constant struggle to control their inner rage. They labelled her Orochi forms as one of the best altered video game characters based on its impact on the storyline and also praised her story and personality.

Famitsu regarded Leona as one of the characters who had the most natural transition to 3D in KOF XIV, noting her sex appeal stands out. Oda agreed, stating this was done because of her simple silhouette. Egames praised her character trailer from The King of Fighters XV for showing notable improvements to her design that made her more appealing. IGN felt the character was redesigned much to the players' confusion.

Gamer Magazine said that unlike other typical Japanese characters such as mature women, lolis, and queens, Leona is a cold-blooded female soldier and praised her stylish special moves. Gamest in their Gals Island series of magazines compared her plain military uniform to Heidern's, but more revealing and somewhat unreliable for self-protection.
