= SNK Gals' Fighters =

2000 video game

- Developers: Yumekobo; Paon
- Publishers: SNK Corporation; SNK of America; Code Mystics (Nintendo Switch)
- Platforms: Neo Geo Pocket Color, Nintendo Switch
- Release: JP: January 27, 2000; NA: February 19, 2000
- Genre: Fighting game
- Modes: Single-player, multiplayer

SNK Gals' Fighters is a fighting game for the Neo Geo Pocket Color, released in 2000. It is a crossover between SNK fighting games including Fatal Fury, Art of Fighting, Samurai Shodown, The King of Fighters, and The Last Blade.

== Gameplay ==
Gals' Fighters features female characters from various SNK franchises, where the characters compete in the aptly named Queen of Fighters tournament, with whoever being able to defeat its mysterious organizer "Miss X" (in reality, Iori Yagami dressed as a woman) being given the K' Talisman, which grants any wish. The characters' sprites were drawn in the same anime super deformed style as other fighters on the system.

The game plays similar to other NGPC fighting games, such as King of Fighters R-1 and R-2, although slightly faster, and with 1-on-1 matches. It also features items that a player can equip to influence the matches; many of the items, however, have no effect on the gameplay.

=== Characters ===
Gals' Fighters features eight standard playable characters, plus three unlockable characters, for a total of 11. This game marks the only playable appearance to date of Yuki, Kyo Kusanagi's girlfriend who had made cameo appearances in prior The King of Fighters games.

- Akari Ichijou
- Athena Asamiya
- Leona Heidern
- Mai Shiranui
- Miss X (Note: Unlockable character) (Note: Boss character)
- Nakoruru
- Shermie
- Shiki
- Whip
- Yuki
- Yuri Sakazaki

== Development and release ==
The game was ported to the Nintendo Switch in the Nintendo eShop on April 29, 2020. It was included as part of Neo Geo Pocket Color Selection Vol. 1 in 2021.

== Reception ==
Reception

Aggregate score
Aggregator	Score
Metacritic	73/100 (Switch)

Review scores
Publication	Score
Nintendo Life	8/10
Digitally Downloaded	3.5/5

Game Informer gave the Neo Geo Pocket version an overall score of 7.5 out of 10 praising the game of being a solid fighter in the Neo Geo collection and the added feature of winning and losing items and giving the characters different abilities, although giving criticism to the game as being too easy even when set on the hardest difficulty concluding “good game, but inferior when stacked up against the recently released Match the Millennium.”

In 2023, Time Extension identified SNK Gals' Fighters as the fourth best game for the NGPC.

== See also ==
- SNK Heroines: Tag Team Frenzy
