= The King of Fighters '99 =

1999 video game

The King of Fighters '99: Millennium Battle
- Promotional artwork featuring K'
- Developer: SNK (Note: Ported to PlayStation by TUG and Yumekobo)
- Publishers: SNK: PlayStation; JP: SNK; NA: Agetec Dreamcast; JP: SNK; NA: Agetec CyberFront Corporation (Windows) SNK Playmore
- Director: Tomoyuki Hosokawa
- Producer: Takashi Nishiyama
- Designers: Akiko Yukawa; Chikara Yamasaki; Kawai Sama
- Programmer: Souta Ichino
- Artist: Toshiaki Mori
- Composers: Hideki Asanaka; Toshio Shimizu; Yasuo Yamate
- Series: The King of Fighters
- Platforms: Arcade, Neo Geo AES, Neo Geo CD, PlayStation, Dreamcast, Microsoft Windows
- Release: July 22, 1999: Arcade; JP: July 22, 1999 Neo Geo AES; NA/JP: September 23, 1999 Neo Geo CD; JP: December 2, 1999; NA: 1999 PlayStation; JP: March 23, 2000; NA: April 27, 2001 Evolution Dreamcast; JP: March 30, 2000; NA: May 8, 2001 Windows; JP: November 27, 2002
- Genre: Fighting
- Modes: Single-player, multiplayer
- Arcade system: Neo Geo MVS

The King of Fighters '99: Millennium Battle, also called KOF '99, is a 1999 fighting game developed and published by SNK for the Neo Geo arcade and home platforms. It is the sixth installment in The King of Fighters series following The King of Fighters '98, introducing a new story arc known as the "NESTS Chronicles" which is centered around a young man named K', who is formerly associated with a mysterious organization known only as NESTS. The game introduces several changes to the established KOF format, most notably an assisting character labeled "Striker". The game was ported to the Neo Geo CD and the PlayStation. Dreamcast and Microsoft Windows versions were also released under the title The King of Fighters' 99: Evolution whose stages were remodeled in 3D.

SNK had originally planned to remove main characters Kyo Kusanagi and Iori Yagami, who had previously appeared in earlier installments of the series, from The King of Fighters '99, but they ended up as hidden characters instead. The popularity of Kyo's previous incarnations resulted in him being given "clones" that wear his original clothes and perform his moves. SNK had difficulty balancing the age of the characters and teams. The Neo Geo AES and Dreamcast versions are both included in The Kings of Fighters NESTS Hen compilation released for the PlayStation 2 in Japan alongside other ports.

Critical response to The King of Fighters '99 has generally been positive because of its fighting system and its use of Strikers. The Dreamcast port of the game has had a more favorable reception than the PlayStation version thanks to its loading times and graphics. While the game has sold well with a total of 168,000 copies, overall sales have been less than those of the series' previous game because of poor sales of the console versions. The game was succeeded by The King of Fighters 2000.

== Gameplay ==
Gameplay screenshot showcasing K' and Robert Garcia calling their respective Striker to attack. The bottom bars indicate how many Strikers the player can use.

Instead of the three-character teams from earlier The King of Fighters (KOF) games, each team now has four members. Before a match, the player chooses three of the characters to use in the fights. The fourth member becomes the "Striker" the player summons during battle to help their character by performing one of their Special Moves against the opponent. A Striker can be summoned only a limited number of times during a single match. This is determined by the number of "Strike Bombs" at the bottom of the screen.

The selectable fighting styles, Advanced and Extra, from The King of Fighters '98 have been removed. Instead, the game has a single playing style modeled after the Advanced mode from the previous game, where the player fills their power gauge by attacking the opponent or performing special moves. This time, there are two powered-up states the player can choose during battle depending on the button combination used. Counter Mode increases the player's offensive strength and allows them unlimited use of their character's Super Special Move. There is also a combo that transitions from a Special Move into a Super Special Move by using a "Super Cancellation Attack" or a "Moving Attack". The other powered-up mode is Armor Mode, which increases the character's defensive strength, allowing them to take more damage from the opponent; however, the player cannot use Super Special Moves in Armor Mode.

Depending on the player's performance, a score is given when the fight is finished. Should a high score be reached, the arcade mode will offer the player an extra fight following the final boss; Kyo Kusanagi or Iori Yagami.

The updated The King of Fighters '99: Evolution version features stages remodeled in 3D and includes two additional stages, as well as new characters who can only be used as Strikers. The new Strikers are Kyo Kusanagi (in a different outfit), Athena Asamiya (in her school outfit), Goro Daimon, Billy Kane, Ryuji Yamazaki, Chizuru Kagura, Syo Kirishima, Alfred, Vanessa, Seth, Fiolina Germi, and Gai Tendo. Also, the game can be connected to the Neo Geo Pocket Color game The King of Fighters: Battle de Paradise. Points won in Battle de Paradise can be transferred to The King of Fighters '99: Evolution to speed up the leveling process for the Extra Strikers.

== Plot and characters ==
Two years have passed since the last King of Fighters tournament. Nobody has seen Kyo Kusanagi or Iori Yagami since they defeated the evil being Orochi at the climax of the 1997 tournament. Invitations are sent to many characters inviting them to a new tournament, which this time around is more of a secretive affair and away from the public eye than the ones in both '96 and '97, with each team now having an additional member. However, the tournament's host remains unknown.

The increased number of characters per team, and the story element of the missing Kyo and Iori, lead to a reshuffling of the character roster. K' is introduced as the game's new protagonist with his partner, Maxima, who joins forces with Kyo's former teammates Benimaru Nikaido and Shingo Yabuki to form the new Hero Team. Takuma Sakazaki rejoins the Art of Fighting Team as its fourth member. Mai Shiranui finally becomes an official member of the Fatal Fury Team for the first time in the series. The new Female Fighters Teams is composed of Art of Fighting guests King and Kasumi Todoh, Fatal Fury characters Blue Mary and Li Xiangfei with the latter making her debut in the KOF franchise. The three returning teams also gain a new member: Whip for the Ikari Warriors Team, Bao for the Psycho Soldier Team, and Jhun Hoon for the Korea Justice Team. The game also introduces two clones of Kyo Kusanagi, Kyo-1 and Kyo-2, as Team Edit characters based on previous playable incarnations of the character. The real Kyo also returns with his rival, Iori, but they are only secret playable characters.

The game's antagonist is Krizalid, an agent from the mysterious organization NESTS who uses the data he obtained from his enemies to activate an army of Kyo clones that NESTS themselves had created after the fight against Orochi. He is faced in two states: first he appears with a special coat that analyzes an opponent's data. Once he's defeated, he burns away his coat and increases his strength while having stronger moves. After Krizalid's defeat, his superior kills him via falling debris while other members of NESTS attack K' and Maxima, who are revealed to be former NESTS agents and that the duo succeed in defeating their enemies before making their escape from the collapsing location of their battle against Krizalid. It's also revealed that K' is a test subject designed to replicate Kyo's techniques.

New characters are marked below in bold:

**K' Team (Hero Team)**

- **K'**
- **Maxima**
- Benimaru Nikaido
- Shingo Yabuki

**Fatal Fury Team**

- Terry Bogard
- Andy Bogard
- Joe Higashi
- Mai Shiranui

**Art of Fighting Team**

- Ryo Sakazaki
- Robert Garcia
- Yuri Sakazaki
- Takuma Sakazaki

**Ikari Warriors Team**

- Leona Heidern
- Ralf Jones
- Clark Still
- **Whip**

**Psycho Soldier Team**

- Athena Asamiya
- Sie Kensou
- Chin Gentsai
- **Bao**

**Women Fighters Team**

- King
- Blue Mary
- Kasumi Todoh
- **Li Xiangfei**

**Korea Justice Team**

- Kim Kaphwan
- Chang Koehan
- Choi Bounge
- **Jhun Hoon**

**Single Entry**

- Kyo Kusanagi
- **Kyo-1**
- **Kyo-2**
- Iori Yagami
- **Krizalid** (Note: Boss character)

== Development ==
Despite K' (right) being the darker successor to the former lead Kyo Kusanagi (left), the latter used to promote the Neo Geo CD port after the revelation of his inclusion in the narrative.

The King of Fighters '99 was the last KOF game with producer Takashi Nishiyama due to issues with the company in 2000. Like the earlier games the artwork was done by Shinkiro. Hiroyuki Kono from SNK said that with The King of Fighters '99 the team was trying to provide new content that previous games lacked. The new characters were decided within the recurring teams to properly fit. Kono thought that of the Striker idea as a change to the franchise in general. With the Strikes system where the fourth character assisted the playable character, SNK aimed to give the player new ideas for combos. However, it still brought several challengers. The story was written with the idea of a new storyline different from the Orochi arc used in previous installment and be more accessible to newcomers. As now every team has one additional character, the developer wanted to expand on the lore, establishing new relationships. The story of the new protagonist K' in The King of Fighters '99 set to be the beginning, Kono already planned the narrative to be further explored in at least two installment and exceed the fans' expectations.

The designs in general were retouched to give a cooler emphasis, most notably in K' as his sophisticated style is meant to breathe new life into the series. Eiji, one of the game's designers, commented that he thought K' would be more popular than he turned out to be, noting that K' was too plain. As the game was developed at the same time as SNK's Garou: Mark of the Wolves, the protagonist's designer was fearing he was too similar to Rock Howard which made him nervous. There were also similarities with Cool from the fighting game The Fallen Angels as its designers moved to SNK to work in The King of Fighters '99. Kyo and Iori were originally designed by Shinichi Morioka who had left Steel Hearts after The Fallen Angels and upon returning to SNK for The King of Fighters '99, he also created K' and Maxima.

With the introduction of a new lead character, K', SNK had originally planned to remove main characters Kyo Kusanagi and Iori Yagami, who had previously appeared in earlier installments of the series, from The King of Fighters '99. Instead, they ended up as unlockable hidden characters after fans responded negatively to their removal at location tests. Kyo and Iori were supposed to disappear due to business reasons or the requests of enthusiastic fans, but in the end they have continued to appear ever since. Kyo was involved in the story to some extent, but not Iori, in terms of the connections with the new protagonist. The same issue would happen in the third story arc, where Kyo and Iori are major characters opposing The King of Fighters 2003 lead Ash Crimson but more due to narrative intended reasons rather than fan demand.

Kyo was redesigned for this game for the first time in the entire series replacing his school uniform with more casual clothing that were well received by the staff and fans. However, developers still liked his school uniform. As a result, based on the practice of adding earlier versions of various characters to games, the staff created the Kyo clones that featured him with classic movesets: Kyo-1 uses Kyo's movesets from the first two games, while Kyo-2 uses his movesets from KOF '96 and KOF '97. To contrast with the previous series' protagonist, Kyo, K' was designed to be the "dark hero". The staff wanted to create a Robo Army Team. This idea was abandoned, but they later created a tribute to it in The King of Fighters 2000 by introducing Rocky, a character from Robo Army, as a Striker for Maxima. The character Whip was originally meant to appear in KOF '96, but due to Leona Heidern's introduction in that game, the staff decided to wait until KOF '99.

The large number of young characters appearing in the game represented a problem for the developers; as a result, the staff introduced older characters such as Seth and Vanessa to balance the game. Bao was added to reduce the average age of the Psycho Soldiers Team from 42 to 34. The boss character, Krizalid, was designed "with a straight, stylish appearance and earnest strength"; however, the designer in charge mentioned he "overdid it". Due to the large number of unused graphics accumulated on the Neo Geo version, some of Krizalid's graphics were removed. With the release of the Dreamcast port, the staff could add Krizalid's graphics because of the console's capacity. Vanessa was meant to be a playable character, but due to time constraints, she was only a Striker in the Dreamcast port. In writing the characters, Akihiko Ureshino sees the leads K' and Maxima as accidental allies due to their need to defeat NESTS being a coincidence. Meanwhile, while Kyo and Iori are always written as rivals who interact before their matches begin, this time their exchanges were made to give a subtext of happiness as both fighters are happy to see each other manage to survive to the battle against the demon Orochi in the 1997 tournament.

== Release ==
The video game was originally released for the Neo Geo MVS arcade systems on July 22, 1999. A port to the Neo Geo AES and Neo Geo CD consoles followed on September 23 and December 2 during 1999, respectively. Meanwhile, the PlayStation port came on March 23, 2000 in Japan and on April 27, 2001 in North America. In Japan, it was later republished for the PlayStation SNK Best Collection on March 29, 2001 and once again on July 25, 2002. Though K' was consistently promoted in each port, Kyo Kusanagi was added to the Neo Geo CD's cover alongside the new lead since he became easier to access.

The North American port was the subject of censorship and blood was omitted. Whip's firearm is edited out of the game's American arcade release, but is uncensored in home release versions. The Neo Geo AES version was added via emulation to the Wii Virtual Console in Japan on December 18, 2012 in North America on May 16, 2013 and in the PAL region on July 4, 2013. Hamster Corporation re-released the game as part of their ACA Neo Geo series for the PlayStation 4, Xbox One, Nintendo Switch, Windows, Android and iOS.

The game was updated for the Sega Dreamcast as The King of Fighters '99: Evolution. It was first published in Japan on March 30, 2000, and reprinted on 25 October 2001 with the "SNK Best" logo. In North America, Agetec published it on 8 May 2001. In this port, players can change the audio to listen to arranged tracks of the soundtrack. A Microsoft Windows version of Evolution was released in Japan on 27 November 2002. The Neo Geo and Dreamcast versions are included in the compilation The Kings of Fighters NESTS Hen released for the PlayStation 2 in Japan. The game was also made available for the PlayStation 4 but only in Japan by Hamster Corporation.

== Related media ==
Two CD soundtracks and a drama CD were published. The series' writer, Akihiko Ureshino, wrote a novelization of the game titled Beyond the "K". It was released in November 1999 by ASCII. In the spin-off game The Rhythm of Fighters, Kyo's character theme, "Tears", was used for the game to work as a rhythm game. Data of the game was used to create the Game Boy Advance game The King of Fighters EX which writer Akihiko Ureshino considers a failure.

== Reception ==
=== Critical reception ===
Reception

Aggregate scores
Aggregator	Score
GameRankings	PS1: 75% DC: 76%
Metacritic	DC: 67/100

Review scores
Publication	Score
GamePro	3.5/5
GameSpot	6.1/10 (PS); 6.6 (DC)
IGN	8.5/10 (DC)
Next Generation	2/5
Nintendo Life	7/10 (Switch)
GameSpew	8/10 (Switch)
Bonus Stage	9/10 (Switch)
Uvejuegos	80/100 (DC)
Gaming Age	B+ (PS)
Video Games	80% (Neo Geo)

In GameSpot's article "The History of SNK", KOF '99: Evolution was described as one of the best fighting games on the Dreamcast with Garou: Mark of the Wolves. RPGFan listed as one of the best games of 1999, comparable to Capcom's Street Fighter III thanks to the focus of new combo possibilities and regarded Kyo Kusanagi's design as one of the best works by SNK. Various video game publications have commented on the game. While the fighting system has been well-received, critics have expressed mixed feelings about the Striker system.

A Gaming Age writer viewed the sequel's changes as a step in the right direction despite finding assisting characters useless. He said that SNK had created proper balances such as making Kyo Kusanagi less overpowered than in previous games. The inclusion of K', the new lead, has been well-received because of his distinct fighting style. IGN's Anthony Chau commented that although "people are probably tired of 2D fighting games, saying that they all play the same", he found KOF '99: Evolution to be very distinct. He found the new gameplay very entertaining despite knowing that some "KOF purists hate the Striker system". A GameSpot reviewer described the Striker system as "clearly derived from the tag system from Capcom's Marvel fighting games". They complained there were popular characters who only appeared as Strikers, and wished they were fully playable. GamePro criticized the game because the Strikers' new gameplay "simply [does not] fit in the King of Fighters series" and "is more of a novelty than a game mode".

There were mixed responses to the home versions. German magazine Video Games praised the Neo Geo AES version, giving it a score of 80%. There have also been multiple comparisons between the Dreamcast port and the PlayStation port, with the Dreamcast version being regarded as better. The use of 3D backgrounds in all versions has been praised. A GamePro writer felt that the Neo Geo's quality was not handled well by the PlayStation, resulting in issues with the graphics and long loading times. Nevertheless, he found the additional material to be pleasing for series' fans. Andrew Seyoon Park of GameSpot found the PlayStation port very good considering the console's limitations. Despite this, he complained about the animation and the voices, and found the reduced number of characters from KOF '98 disappointing. He felt that the boss Krizalid is very hard to beat. HardcoreGaming noted that while the Dreamcast port of the game was superior based on its graphics and loading times, the PlayStation version was still worth playing. Uvejuegos stated that while the game did not have a major update of its characters, except Kyo Kusanagi's redesign, it still managed to maintain its quality due to its fighting system. The new lead, K', and the final boss, Krizalid, were described as entertaining. Gaming Age felt the graphic update was more noticeable than the Uvejuegos did but was critical of Krizalid as a result of how difficult he is to beat when compared to the famous previous Rugal Bernstein and Orochi. GameSpot agreed, feeling that the boss fight removed the entertainment value from the game due to its difficult challenge. Greg Orlando reviewed the Dreamcast version of the game for Next Generation, rating it two stars out of five, and stated that "This King of Fighters should consider abdicating the throne."

The emulated Nintendo Switch version has garnered a similar response, with reviewers finding it modern and praising its gameplay. Critics said the game's gameplay and graphics were ahead of their time. Nintendo Life praised the varied cast and the new gameplay mechanics but did not find it as appealing as its predecessor. GameSpew felt the port's mechanics, and multiple options prevented the game from being dated. The combat was described as fast enough to appeal to gamers. Bonus Stage found the graphics appealing and praised SNK's focus on giving the game a storyline, despite it being an arcade fighting game. In retrospect, 1UP.com said that while players were bothered by Kyo and Iori's exclusion from teams, and by the Striker system, K's inclusion was one of SNK's best decisions due to his fighting style.

=== Sales ===
The King of Fighters '99 was very popular after its release. According to Famitsu, both the AES and Neo Geo CD sold over 14,620 and 18,925 copies in their first week on the market respectively. The PlayStation port sold 96,484. The Dreamcast version was released during the PlayStation 2's launch and the Dreamcast's ending, and it did not achieve very good sales according to a GameSpot article. On its release week, the Dreamcast port sold 41,387 units.
