= The King of Fighters '97 =

1997 video game

- Artwork for arcade and console releases
- Developer: SNK: Yumekobo (Saturn) Ukiyotei (PS1) Code Mystics (Global Match)
- Publishers: SNK; SNK Playmore (Global Match)
- Director: Toyohisa Tanabe
- Producer: Takashi Nishiyama
- Designers: Akiko Yukawa; Aska Tahara; Chikara Yamasaki
- Programmers: S. Fujinuki; Souta Ichino
- Artist: Toshiaki Mori
- Composers: Akihiro Uchida; Hideki Asanaka; Toshio Shimizu
- Series: The King of Fighters
- Platforms: Arcade, Neo Geo AES, Neo Geo CD, PlayStation, Sega Saturn
- Release: July 28, 1997: Arcade; WW: July 28, 1997 Neo Geo AES; WW: September 25, 1997 Neo Geo CD; WW: October 30, 1997 Saturn; JP: March 26, 1998 PlayStation; JP: May 28, 1998
- Genre: Fighting
- Modes: Single-player, multiplayer
- Arcade system: Neo Geo MVS

The King of Fighters '97 (Note: Japanese: ザ・キング・オブ・ファイターズ'97, Hepburn: Za Kingu Obu Faitāzu '97), often shortened as KOF '97, is a 1997 fighting video game developed and published by SNK for the Neo Geo arcade and home platforms. It is the fourth game in The King of Fighters (KOF) series. The game was ported to the Neo Geo CD console and released worldwide; it was also ported to the PlayStation and Sega Saturn consoles in Japan. KOF '97 is the last game in the "Orochi Saga" storyline, which began in The King of Fighters '95. The new tournament focuses on the servants of the demon Yamata no Orochi, also known as the "Will of Gaia", who plan to revive their master by gathering energy and sacrifices from the fighters in the KOF tournament.

KOF '97 is the first game in the series to be directed by its battle system designer Toyohisa Tanabe. The original director is credited to Masanori Kuwasashi, who stopped working on the series after The King of Fighters '96. The creation of the game's characters primarily focused on creating bosses, especially Orochi, to properly tell the game's story in an appealing fashion. Among its several ports, SNK developed a version of KOF '97 subtitled Global Match that has online features.

Upon its release, game designers praised KOF '97 for the handling of its narrative earning Best Direction award in 1997 as a result in the Gamest awards, though critics were divided on whether the controls and balance were better than those of previous installments. The game sold well and was followed by The King of Fighters '98, which includes most of the Orochi arc cast, who fight in a non-canonical tournament. Yumekobo also created a visual novel with role-playing game elements titled The King of Fighters: Kyo, which retells the events of The King of Fighters '97 but primarily focuses on Kyo's life. The first handheld-based game in the series, King of Fighters R-1, was released in 1998 based on The King of Fighters '97. A spin-off light novel titled The King of Fantasy was released in 2019. The combined ports sold together over 336,000 copies in Japan.

== Gameplay ==
Gameplay screenshot showcasing a match between Shermie in Extra Mode battling Ralf Jones in Advanced Mode.

The King of Fighters '97 is a fighting game that features gameplay similar to previous installments in the series, which primarily involves the use of three-character teams. Two new playing styles are introduced, "Advanced" and "Extra", which the player can select before choosing their team.

Advanced mode is based on KOF '96 including the ability to dodge moves, counterattack or plan jumps but has a redesigned Power Gauge. The Power Gauge, instead of charging, is now filled whenever the player strikes the opponent or when Special Moves are performed. The player can stock up to three Power Gauges. The player can use one stock of the Power Gauge to perform a Super Special Move or enter a "MAX" mode, in which the player's defensive and offensive strength are increased. By performing a Super Special Move while in MAX mode, the player can perform a more-powerful Super Special Move.

Extra mode is based on the first two games in the series, KOF '94 and KOF '95. As in those games, the player fills the Power Gauge by charging it or defending against the opponent's attacks. After the gauge is filled, the player enters MAX mode and, as in Advanced mode, their character's offense and defense increases. The player can only perform Super Special Moves in Max mode or when the life gauge is nearly empty and flashing red. The Super move are more powerful when the player performs a Super move in MAX mode while the life gauge is flashing red. The Emergency Roll maneuver from KOF '96 used in Advanced mode is replaced with the side-step from KOF '94 and KOF '95.

== Plot and characters ==
The highly successful and lucrative King of Fighters (KOF) tournament has sparked a worldwide fighting craze. Within a few months of the tournament ending, large corporations had held smaller KOF tournament qualifiers and constructed special KOF stadiums around the world to hype the next tournament. News of the next tournament spreads and new fighters arrive to watch the preliminary matches. All of the previous game's characters, except the disbanded Boss Team, return. Kasumi Todoh went to search for her father, and Mature and Vice were killed by Iori Yagami after he was possessed by the previous game's Riot of Blood. Chizuru Kagura, the sub-boss in the previous game, takes Kasumi's place in the Women Fighters Team. Geese Howard's underling Billy Kane, who participated in The King of Fighters '95, returns to work with the agent Blue Mary and the wanted felon Ryuji Yamazaki (both from Fatal Fury 3: Road to the Final Victory) to form the "'97 Special Team". Iori returns as a Team Edit character along with Shingo Yabuki, a high-school student who patterns his fighting style on that of his idol and reluctant mentor Kyo Kusanagi. An alternative version of Kyo with his pre-KOF '96 moveset appears as a hidden character.

Iori and Leona appear to fight as mid-boss characters in the Riot of the Blood curse, depending on which characters the player is using. A team of all-new characters, Yashiro Nanakase, Shermie, and Chris, form the "New Faces Team", which is revealed to be the last-three servants from Orochi during the Arcade Mode. The New Faces Team fights as sub-boss characters, having more powerful abilities than their common forms. Once they are defeated, Orochi possesses Chris' body to fight as the final boss character. Depending on the team chosen, Orochi takes a rest in most fights with the New Faces Team offering their lives to their lord to revive him. If the Hero Team wins the final battle, Iori challenges Kyo to a one-on-one fight. The plot is further altered if the player uses the Sacred Treasures Team composed of Kyo, Iori and Chizuru; it is revealed Kyo's girlfriend Yuki is a descendant of the goddess Kushinadahime, who is meant to be offered to revive Orochi. The defeated Orochi tries to use Iori's curse to turn him against his teammates but Iori resists and Kyo finishes the demon.

New characters to the series are marked below in bold:

**Hero Team**

- Kyo Kusanagi
- Benimaru Nikaido
- Goro Daimon

**Fatal Fury Team**

- Terry Bogard
- Andy Bogard
- Joe Higashi

**Art of Fighting Team**

- Ryo Sakazaki
- Robert Garcia
- Yuri Sakazaki

**Ikari Warriors Team**

- Leona Heidern
- Ralf Jones
- Clark Still

**Psycho Soldier Team**

- Athena Asamiya
- Sie Kensou
- Chin Gentsai

**Korea Justice Team**

- Kim Kaphwan
- Chang Koehan
- Choi Bounge

**Women Fighters Team**

- Chizuru Kagura
- Mai Shiranui
- King

**New Faces Team**

- **Yashiro Nanakase**
- **Shermie**
- **Chris**

**Special Team**

- **Ryuji Yamazaki**
- **Blue Mary**
- Billy Kane

**Sub-Boss Team**

- **Orochi Yashiro** (Note: Boss character)
- **Orochi Shermie**
- **Orochi Chris**

**Single Entries**

- Iori Yagami
- **Shingo Yabuki**
- Kyo Kusanagi '94 Version
- **Orochi**
- **Orochi Iori**
- **Orochi Leona**

== Development ==
Concept art of Kyo facing Orochi by Shinkiro as influenced by Japanese myths.

The series' previous installment, The King of Fighters '96, was the last game to be directed by Masanori Kuwasashi, who experienced pressure with the annual release schedule. Kuwasashi was replaced with battle designer Toyohisa Tanabe, who ended the Orochi arc with The King of Fighters '97. Tanabe was in charge of balancing characters; his main objective was to end the Orochi story arc by revealing the title villain who would become a boss and face the Sacred Treasures Team, who debuted in the previous game. KOF '97 was intended to improve on the previous game's new, experimental systems. The Orochi arc was planned since the series' beginning; the protagonist Kyo Kusanagi was inspired by Japanese myths, most notably the Kusanagi no Tsurugi weaponry obtained by the god Susanoo-no-Mikoto followed by the encounter with the mythical beast. He was also given a move titled "Orochinagi" which was conceptualized to be used to defeat it. The developers wanted to give players a large number of combos with the new characters and moves, leading to the development of the game's Advanced and Extra fighting systems.

The narrative of KOF '97 focuses on Kyo and his social life as antagonists almost sacrifice his girlfriend Yuki to revive the final boss. Although Yuki only has one line in the game, SNK carefully chose a voice actor for the character, who speaks in the Sacred Treasures Team's ending as a cameo when Kyo thinks of Yuki as he defeats the final boss. The gameplay was created to appeal to players of The King of Fighters '95 and The King of Fighters '96. The latter game onwards removed Kyo's original projectile version in exchange for hand-to-hand combat. This version of the protagonist was added as an alternative playable version because he was popular with gamers. There were two weeks of development for the game to properly balance the characters' moves and thus avoid overpowered and underpowered characters.

Among other subplots, Iori Yagami in his Orochi form was originally meant to be the final boss of the game after the player beats the New Faces Team in their Orochi forms. It was later decided to make Orochi Iori the mid-boss, with Orochi as the final boss and the New Faces Team as sub-bosses. Tanabe stated the staff was initially reluctant to add this version of Iori to the series' roster due to worries about fan reactions, but did so to add more impact to the Orochi Saga's climax. He was particularly pleased to see surprised reactions from female fans to this form during KOF '97's location testing. After deciding Iori as the mid-boss character, developers focused on adding Leona Heidern as an alternative mid-boss character if players were already using Iori in the game. As such, several television advertisements, and advertisements in other media, were produced to notify players about a "fork in the game" and to give hints about Orochi Leona. Leona was revealed to be related with the Orochi, and the missing character Heidern acted as Leona's father figure. Key arts of snakes were heavily featured in promotion of the game to symbolize the villain.

The New Faces Team was created to offset the remaining top-three characters. The team-member characters were developed as a counterpart to the Hero Team; Chris manipulates fire like Kyo, Shermie uses lightning like Benimaru Nikaido and Yashiro Nanakase is a male giant like Goro Daimon. The plot element of Chris acting as a new body for Orochi was developed in the early stages of production, but the staff considered using other ideas. At the start of production, the plan was for Chris to use the "Flame of Darkness (Black Flame)" but because viewing the black flame on a screen was difficult, its color was changed to purple. Orochi was first intended as "a buck-naked Chris" fighting with a shining energy ball. His final design was chosen after developers conducted a survey in which only two responders favored the first design. Orochi's character-design codename was "Chief", but several people opposed giving him the final name.

In regards to characters from other series, Blue Mary from Fatal Fury 3 was favored over her later designs. To have all eight of the servants of Orochi confirmed in this game, Ryuji Yamazaki from Fatal Fury 3 was chosen as the new member because the developers considered him to be a good villain and liked his snake-like appearance—the ancient Orochi was a giant snake. To adapt the character for KOF '97, the game planner provided Yamazaki with new moves. Yamazaki was too different from his Fatal Fury persona after Tanabe got the producer's permission as in KOF he is a rebellious servant of the villains while in his original game he is portrayed as a man working for the mafia.

== Release ==
The King of Fighters '97 was first released in Japanese arcades on July 28, 1997. It was ported to the Neo Geo AES and the Neo-Geo CD on September 25 and October 30, 1997, respectively. A PlayStation version was released on May 28, 1998. A Sega Saturn version was released in Japan on March 26, 1998, and requires the same 1MB RAM cartridge used by the previous game. A "Saturn Best Collection" edition was first released on October 1, 1998, with a new cover and a lower price.

An emulated version of the game was released as part of The King of Fighters Collection: The Orochi Saga in 2008 for the PlayStation 2, PlayStation Portable and Wii. The Neo Geo AES version was added via emulation to the Wii Virtual Console in Japan on September 6, 2011, in the PAL region on February 9, 2012, and in North America on March 8, 2012. An emulated version was released for the mobile operating systems iOS and Android in 2013; the iOS version supports the iCade accessory.

Hamster Corporation re-released the game as part of their ACA Neo Geo series for the PlayStation 4, Xbox One, Nintendo Switch, Windows, Android and iOS. Another emulated release of the arcade version titled The King of Fighters '97 Global Match, featuring online multiplayer, was released in 2018 for the PlayStation 4, PlayStation Vita, and Microsoft Windows via Steam.

== Reception ==
=== Critical reception ===
Reception

Review scores
| Publication | Score |
|---|---|
| AllGame | NG: 4/5 |
| Nintendo Life | Wii: 8/10 |
| Pocket Gamer | AND/iOS: 3/5 |
| TouchArcade | iOS: 3.5/5 |
| 148Apps | iOS: 4/5 |
| Consoles News | PS1: 8/10 |
| Fun Generation | PS1: 6/10 |
| MAN!AC | Saturn/PS1: 85% |
| Mega Fun | PS1: 18% |
| Sega Saturn Magazine | Saturn: 91% |
| Slide to Play | iOS: 3/4 |
| Video Games | NGCD: 79% |

Award
| Publication | Award |
|---|---|
| Gamest | Most popular Best Direction; Coin-op earnings |

The King of Fighters '97 received positive reviews, with critics offering praise for its characters and narrative. AllGame wrote the game's presentation was the best in the series, calling it one of the best 2D fighting games. Hardcore Gaming 101 appreciated the new characters and their playstyle, and commended the seamless integration of the story into the game. The reviewer praised the gameplay changes as "great" but criticized the game for being unbalanced, and described the controls as more responsive than in any previous entry in the series. The reviewer praised the game's soundtrack but noted players do not hear much of it during the game. Reviewing the Virtual Console release, Nintendo Life compared KOF '97 to KOF '95, saying the difference is huge in regards to the large amount of improvements SNK made across the years such as cast, animations and more balanced artificial intelligence. Sega Saturn Magazine said KOF '97 was a return to form for the series after the "disappointment" of KOF '96. Overall, it was noted as a "great game" and a "fantastic update".

With regards to the game's narrative, 1UP.com said the addition of the new Sacred Treasure Team is a proper conclusion to the Orochi story arc and praised the characters, most notably Kyo's arc, who has to deal with Orochi to save his girlfriend. According to Kotaku, Kyo is the most heroic character in the series, considering his role in the Orochi arc where he faces enemies with the Hero Team and Sacred Treasures, while Nintendo World Report the final fights Kyo and Iori had were an "epic and heroic battle". Media also praised the inclusion of Iori's and Leona's Orochi forms for their berserker behavior and the violent methods they display in the story and gameplaywise.

Reviews of home console ports of The King of Fighters '97 varied, with technical issues often being the focus of criticism. Video Games and MAN!AC positively assessed the Neo Geo CD and PlayStation ports, but criticized the excessively lengthy load times. Video Games deemed KOF '97 "slightly worse" than KOF '96. The magazine said that the PlayStation version has marginally shorter load times compared to the Neo Geo CD version. Consoles News said the PlayStation version's load times were optimized and noted it as the best PlayStation port of an SNK game, but said it was inferior to the Sega Saturn port. Fun Generation did not like the visual presentation and the long load times, and called the music some of the worst on the PlayStation. The reviewer praised the game for its playability and recommended it only for experienced fighting-game fans. Mega Fun complained about the small sprites compared to those in the arcade version, and called the gameplay tired.

The iOS version received mixed reviews, with reviewers divided over the port's touchscreen controls. 148Apps praised the port for its wealth of control options. Slide to Play said the virtual controls work well but the button layout is too cluttered. Pocket Gamer reviewer called KOF '97 the best of the Orochi Saga games but said it does not work well with touchscreen controls. TouchArcade reviewed the 2023 version, saying that the multiplayer options made it one of the best mobile ports ever. On a more negative note, Gaming Age gave the game a D+, saying the game is difficult to play and does not provide tutorials to learn how to play characters, and noted input lag. Kenneth Brunton, writing for Bonus Stage UK, was more positive, praising the presentation and saying the input lag was tolerable.

=== Popularity ===
In Japan, Game Machine listed The King of Fighters '97 in its September 1, 1997, issue as being the second-most-successful arcade game of the month. In the Gamest awards from 1997, it was awarded "Best Direction" for its narrative, took 2nd place in "Game of the Year" and "Best Fighting Game", losing to Darkstalkers 3 in the two occasions. When it comes to popularity, readers voted as one of the most popular fighting games of 1997 beating Marvel Super Heroes vs. Street Fighter, Tekken 3, Darkstalkers 3, and Virtua Fighter 3 especially when it comes to the original arcade version.

By August 1998, The King of Fighters '97 had shipped 50,000 arcade sets in Japan and 100,000 overseas, the highest number among Neo Geo games. According to Famitsu, the AES version sold over 19,900 copies in its first week on the market.

During its release week, the Sega Saturn port of the game sold 94,327 copies in Japan. As of 2004, the game had sold 156,717 copies in Japan. The PlayStation port sold 160,124 units.

In the book Representation of Observations in Reinforcement Learning for Playing Arcade Fighting Game, The King of Fighters '97 is seen as one of the most notable arcade game ever released with more complex moves than the ones SNK's rivals tend to use, which prompted the study to use the game to educate Multi-CNN Model and Transfer Learning. The search model, evaluating each character for 50 fights each, found that Kyo and Iori are the ones used the most, and with the Kyo requiring the most hours for the model to adapt to.

=== Legacy ===
The King of Fighters '97 was followed by The King of Fighters '98. The developers wanted to bring back old characters, and Vice and Mature were given new moves. The introduction of the classic Kyo Kusanagi from KOF '97 was noted to be "a hit" with gamers. The developers added new alternative versions of other characters to the sequels, leading to the creation of the Kyo clones Kyo-1 and Kyo-2, from The King of Fighters '99, and with a now-more-experienced Kyo with new moves.

Yumekobo and SNK developed a game titled The King of Fighters: Kyo, which was based on Masato Natsumoto's eponymous manga. It was released on August 27, 1998, in Japan for the Sony PlayStation. The game is presented as a visual novel set before The King of Fighters '97, with fights arranged in a similar fashion to turn-based role-playing games. The player-character primarily confronts Kyo.

Writer Akihiko Ureshino also made a light novel based on the installment which he found as one successful in retrospect which was supported by the game. KOF '97 also inspired a spin-off light novel titled The King of Fantasy: Yagami Iori's Another World ~Remember When You See The Moon!~ (ザ・キング・オブ・ファンタジー 八神庵の異世界無双 ～月を見るたび思い出せ！～, The King of Fantasy: Yagami Iori no Isekai Musō ~Tsukio Miru Tabi Omoidase!~), which was written by Nobuhiko Tenkawa and illustrated by Eisuke Ogura. It was published in 2019 by Kadokawa Shoten. The novel primarily focuses on Iori and Kyo, who are trapped in another world after Orochi's defeat, and they meet alternate versions of the characters from the games.
