= The King of Fighters '96 =

1996 video game

- Promotional flyer featuring Kyo Kusanagi and the cast below
- Developer: SNK: Yumekobo (Saturn) Gaibrain (Game Boy)
- Publishers: SNK: Game Boy; JP: Takara; EU: Laguna
- Director: Masanori Kuwasashi
- Producer: Takashi Nishiyama
- Designers: Eri Koujitani; Kaori Kusunoki; Masato Yokoyama
- Programmers: Khozoh Nagashima; S. Fujinuki
- Artist: Toshiaki Mori
- Composers: Akihiro Uchida; Hideki Asanaka; Kazuhiro Nishida
- Series: The King of Fighters
- Platforms: Arcade, Game Boy, Neo Geo AES, Neo Geo CD, PlayStation, Sega Saturn
- Release: July 30, 1996: Arcade; JP: July 30, 1996 Neo Geo AES; NA/JP: September 27, 1996 Neo Geo CD; NA/JP: October 25, 1996 Saturn; JP: December 31, 1996 PlayStation; JP: July 4, 1997 Game Boy; JP: August 7, 1997; EU: 1998
- Genre: Fighting
- Modes: Single-player, multiplayer
- Arcade system: Neo Geo MVS

The King of Fighters '96 (Note: Japanese: ザ・キング・オブ・ファイターズ'96, Hepburn: Za Kingu Obu Faitāzu '96) (KOF '96) is a 1996 fighting game developed and published by SNK for the Neo Geo arcade and home platforms. It is the third game in The King of Fighters series, following The King of Fighters '95. Unlike its predecessors, it features more emphasis on hand-to-hand combat rather than projectile moves. The plot follows a new King of Fighters tournament created by Chizuru Kagura, the heir of the Yata Clan, who wants to find and recruit the protagonist, Kyo Kusanagi, who defeated the previous host Rugal Bernstein. She seeks to recruit him to ask him and his bitter rival, Iori Yagami, to help her in the sealing of the Orochi demon like her predecessors. The final boss of the game is Goenitz, one of the servants of Orochi. Developers made several changes to the cast when compared to The King of Fighters '95, with special focus on a Boss Team composed of famous villains from their other two IPs, Fatal Fury and Art of Fighting.

SNK members had trouble with the development of the game, which continued right up until its scheduled release. This happened because the developers had difficulty making the sprites and special moves of the new characters of the game. The game received mixed reviews from several video games publications. While some reviewers praised the graphical improvements and the addition of new characters in the game, some commented that its gameplay was unbalanced in comparison to its prequels as a result of characters possessing new moves that failed to mesh the ideas of projectiles and hand-to-hand combat.

Like its predecessor, the game was ported to the Neo-Geo CD, as well as the PlayStation and Sega Saturn. Unlike the previous game, the PlayStation and Saturn versions were released only in Japan, with a language setting allowing the player to set the game to English. The game would later be ported to other consoles such as the PlayStation 2, PlayStation Portable, Wii Virtual Console, and PlayStation 4 as part of the King of Fighters Collection: The Orochi Saga, as the story follows a story arc that begins in The King of Fighters '95 and ends with The King of Fighters '97. The game sold over 188,000 copies.

== Gameplay ==
A match between Mature (bottom center) and Mai Shiranui (bottom left). The match's timer, team information and health bars are displayed at the top while the power gauges are at the bottom.

KOF '96 is a fighting game that carries the same goal of previous games in the series, involving the creation of a team of three fighters who participate in the title tournament against several rivals. This installment makes significant changes to the gameplay of previous KOF games by introducing new techniques. The Dodge technique from the previous two games has been replaced with an "emergency evasion" or "attack deflector" technique, which allows the player's character to roll away or towards the opponent. In the latter case, the player has the opportunity to end up on the other side of their opponent. The player can also determine the height of their jumps and perform small or high jumps. Moreover, the player is able to perform several counter-techniques to cancel the enemies' attacks.

Additionally, Super Special Moves can still be performed when the Power Gauge is filled up or when the player's life gauge is flashing red, but now the player can also perform a more powerful version of their regular Super move if both conditions are met (i.e. the player has low energy and their power gauge has reached Maximum level). One other change to the gameplay system is that the player can now run instead of hopping forward in order to approach the opponent faster. While the game includes several bosses, both Chizuru Kagura and Goenitz can be unlocked as playable characters. This is the first game that the Combo Counter entitled Rush can be used in the game.

== Plot and characters ==
In-universe, a new King of Fighters tournament is announced, though the letters of invitation sent out to the fighters are no longer sent by Rugal Bernstein. The fighter roster has undergone major changes since the previous tournament. The Rival Team was disbanded, with only Iori Yagami returning, while Heidern and Takuma Sakazaki retired from the tournament. Takuma's spot in the Art of Fighting Team is taken by his daughter, Yuri Sakazaki, formerly with the Women Fighters Team. New figures include Kasumi Todoh from Art of Fighting 3, who takes Yuri's place in the Women Fighters Team; Leona, who joins the Ikari Team in place of her mentor and adoptive father, Heidern; Mature and Vice, two of Rugal's assistants who join Iori Yagami as members of the new Yagami Team; and the Boss Team, composed of Geese Howard, Wolfgang Krauser, and Mr. Big, all villains from the Fatal Fury and Art of Fighting series.

The tournament is now held by Chizuru Kagura, a descendant of the ancient Yata Clan, which is one of the three clans responsible for sealing away the snake demon, Orochi. The other two clans are the Kusanagi and Yasanaki clans, from which Kyo Kusanagi and Iori Yagami are descended. Chizuru uses the tournament in the hopes of recruiting Kyo and Iori in order to stop the upcoming Orochi threat. The new boss is Goenitz, a servant of Orochi, who wants to stop Chizuru's plans of sealing his master. After Chizuru tests the winners, Goentiz ambushes her and faces the player. Following his defeat, Goenitz passes away as his body disappears in a tornado. If Kyo and Iori are allied with Chizuru, the two rivals join forces to incinerate Goentiz in combat. If Goenitz is chosen by the player, Goenitz is defeated by Chizuru's late sister, Maki, who put a spell on him before her death.

Hero Team

- Kyo Kusanagi
- Benimaru Nikaido
- Goro Daimon

Fatal Fury Team

- Terry Bogard
- Andy Bogard
- Joe Higashi

Art of Fighting Team

- Ryo Sakazaki
- Robert Garcia
- Yuri Sakazaki

Ikari Warriors Team

- Leona Heidern (new)
- Ralf Jones
- Clark Still

Psycho Soldier Team

- Athena Asamiya
- Sie Kensou
- Chin Gentsai

Korea Justice Team

- Kim Kaphwan
- Chang Koehan
- Choi Bounge

Women Fighters Team

- Kasumi Todoh (new)
- Mai Shiranui
- King

Rivals Team

- Iori Yagami
- Mature (new)
- Vice (new)

Boss Team

- Geese Howard (new)
- Wolfgang Krauser (new)
- Mr. Big (new)

Mid-Boss

- Chizuru Kagura (new)

Main Boss

- Goenitz (new)

== Development ==
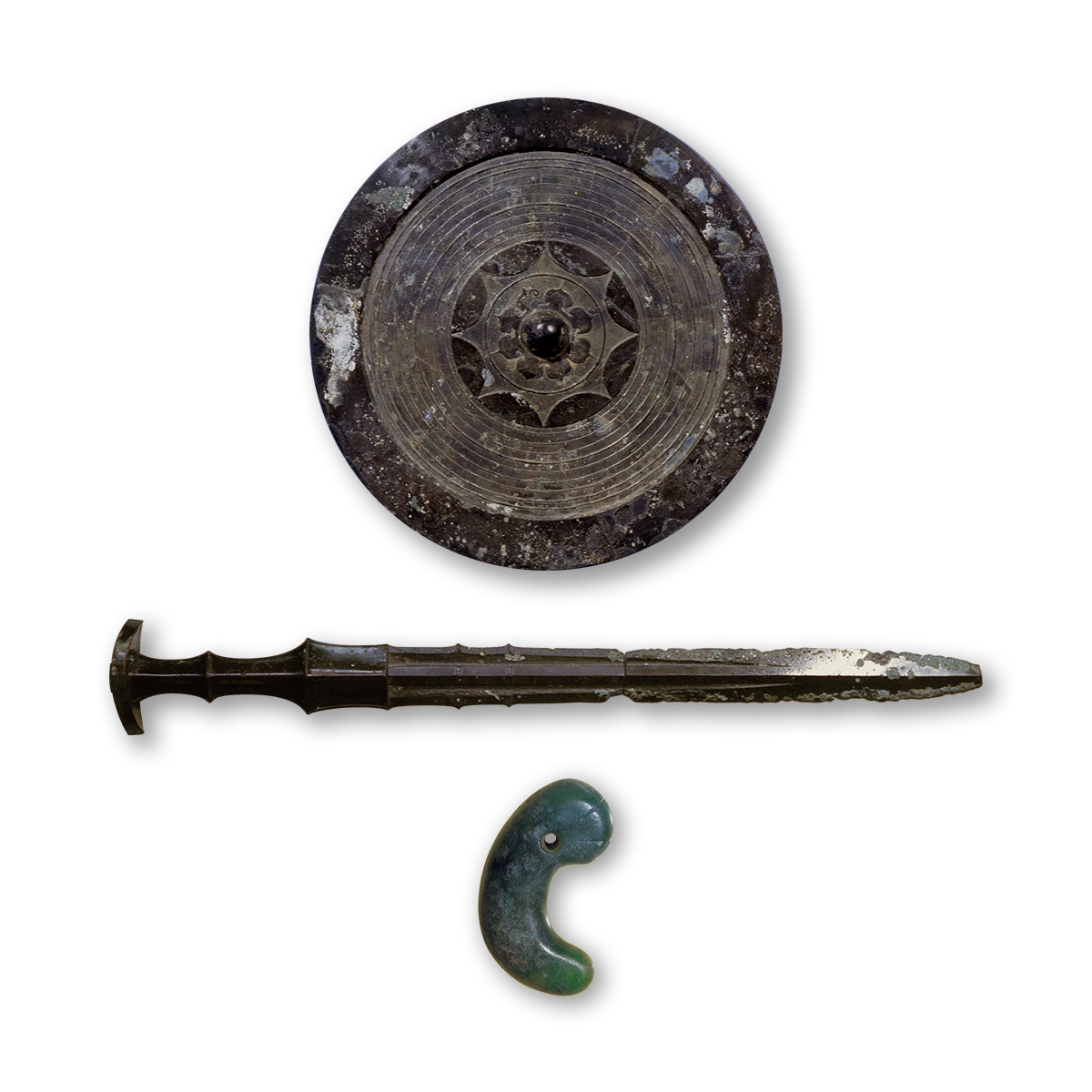
The game's narrative expanded the Orochi arc of the series by focusing on the representations of the three Imperial Regalia of Japan, the sword, the mirror, and the jewel. These are represented in the protagonist, Kyo, the rival, Iori, and the new character, Chizuru.

SNK developer Yasuyuki Oda referred to KOF '96 as the most important game from the franchise because it served as the basis for most of their works. The development period for KOF '96 continued right up to the time of its scheduled release. At the location test for the title, Mature and Vice were still not included in the game, since the staff did not have enough time to completely design them. The King of Fighters '96 was the second game to break the technical limits of the Neo Geo platform by using a memory footprint of 362 mega bits (which is roughly 46 mega bytes). While the first two games used the Neo Geo MVS arcade, The King of Fighters '96 included 68 KB of video RAM and 64 KB of RAM. This made The King of Fighters '96 the first game to break the technical limits of the MVS system. SNK staff members noted that due to the great popularity of some of the series's characters, it was difficult to design new ones that would have the same appeal. This also happened during location tests of new games. The number of deadlines led to having to balance issues and bugs. The game took a year to develop; the first King of Fighters, by comparison, took two years. A total of six musicians worked on the audio.

While the previous installment was created to develop the protagonist, Kyo Kusanagi, and his rival Iori Yagami, The King of Fighters '96 was mainly created to continue the narrative of the Orochi arc, based on Japanese myths. Director Masanori Kuwasashi was responsible for the handling of the Orochi arc, which he based on the Yamata no Orochi demon, from which the antagonist is derived. The game established that Kyo's and Iori's predecessors trained together to create a nearly identical fighting style, but due to the latter's corruption by Orochi, Iori's clan was able to harness sinister techniques that differentiated them from their peers. Originally, The King of Fighters '95 was intended to be a complete remake of The King of Fighters '94, but due to time constraints, it was The King of Fighters '96 that was a complete revamp in comparison. Chizuru Kagura was created as a means to expand the Orochi arc and bring Kyo and Iori together as the "Three Sacred Treasures Team", which represents the three Imperial Regalia of Japan: the sword, the mirror, and the jewel. Their ancestors were then said to have defeated Orochi during the time of myths. Due to issues with development, the original clothing damage Yuri Sakazaki and King were to suffer when defeated by special moves was removed. Mai Shiranui's bouncing-cleavage animation was also changed due to censorship from non-Japanese games. Mai's artist had to be told there was too much work to be done to reuse Mai's appearance. In retrospect, The King of Fighters '96 was the first game from the franchise developed to openly compete with other games on the market. However, The King of Fighters '96 was the last game directed by Kuwasashi, who expressed experiencing pressure due to the annual release schedule. This led to his eventual replacement with battle designer Toyohisa Tanabe as the next director; he would end the Orochi arc with The King of Fighters '97.

The basic concept of the game was novelty through new characters, new language, and new systems. The key point was how to change the way the players used the characters. The tempo of the game increased. SNK aimed to create a game with less waiting and more attacking. How to make the new characters stand out was also a considerable issue. The original attack evasion move caused the game to pause for a moment. The developers felt that this was an element that contradicted their previous aim of speeding up the game, and although the "attack evasion" itself was well received, they changed it to an "emergency return action" that involved movement - though this was also a bit difficult to use. This led to the removal of projectile techniques to make fights more strategic and make the characters more unique. Many people attended the location testing events, which provided the developers with feedback about the mechanics, and helped to further balance the game. The inclusion of Geese was innovative, but at the same time was confusing to players because the game was released after Real Bout Fatal Fury, which marked the death of that character. Among several characters, the protagonist Kyo Kusanagi has different moves, which reinforce a hand-to-hand combat style rather than throwing projectiles like in previous games. While Kyo remained popular, SNK developers noted players missed the original Kyo play style, which often resulted in subsequent games including an alternate version of the main character that possessed his classic moves. The team was confident in their cast and visuals and showed all of them in the intro sequence.

Kasumi Todoh was added to the cast since the coinciding release of Art of Fighting 3 had increased the character's profile. Geese from Fatal Fury was first meant to appear in KOF '95, but developers had abandoned this idea. When KOF '96 began development, the staff decided to make Geese a playable character. The Boss Team in which he starred along with Mr. Big and Wolfgang Krauser received "special treatment", such as music for each individual team member (in comparison to other teams, each of which only had one song total). Due to memory restrictions, some of the special moves that were designed for Geese had to be left out of the game. Artist Shinkiro considered Leona to be an "ice queen" persona; the opposite of Mai Shiranui from Fatal Fury. SNK artist Falcoon stated that Leona was the company's response to Street Fighter character Cammy; both are implosion assassins. The sub-boss character, Chizuru Kagura, was the hardest one to create. Her pixelated image was completed in a month, resulting in her designer working overtime. The game was also intended to introduce Whip into the Ikari Team. However, due to Leona's introduction to the same team, the developers waited until The King of Fighters '99 to add her to the cast. The final boss, Goenitz, was written to be an antagonist who surpassed the previous villain, Rugal Bernstein.

=== Release ===
The original KOF '96 was released for Japanese arcades on July 30, 1996. Initial ports of the game, for the Neo Geo and Neo Geo CD consoles, arrived on September 27, 1996, and October 25, 1996, respectively. A port for the Sega Saturn followed shortly thereafter on December 31, 1996, while a PlayStation version didn't arrive until several months later on July 4, 1997. Unlike the previous game, the PlayStation and Saturn versions were released only in Japan. The Saturn version optionally used a 1MB RAM cartridge to run additional animations which would not fit in the Saturn's internal RAM. Titled Nettō The King of Fighters '96, it was released on August 8, 1997, and was then released in Europe titled The King of Fighters: Heat of Battle in 1998. The Game Boy game featured a secret code for "Carnage" mode, which allowed the player's (including CPU) Power Gauge to be filled automatically without charging. This feature also enabled the player to use powerful versions of their Super Special Moves and normal versions of Super Special Moves without having the player's health at a low level. Characters exclusive to the Game Boy version included Orochi Iori and Orochi Leona from The King of Fighters '97; a stronger version of Chizuru Kagura; the final boss of the game, Goenitz; and Takuma Sakazaki's alter-ego Mr. Karate from Art of Fighting.

An emulated version of the game was produced as part of The King of Fighters Collection: The Orochi Saga in 2008 for the PlayStation 2, PlayStation Portable, and Wii. The Neo Geo AES version was added via emulation to the Wii Virtual Console in Japan on February 15, 2011, in North America on July 12, 2012, and in the PAL region on November 22, 2012. Hamster Corporation re-released the game as part of their ACA Neo Geo series for the PlayStation 4, Xbox One, Nintendo Switch, Windows, Android and iOS.

== Related media ==
An extensive database for the game, titled The King of Fighters '96 Neo Geo Collection, became available in Japan on February 14, 1997, to promote the year's title. It was available only for the Neo-Geo CD. The database included the game's intro, an interactive reenactment of the game's backstory, character profiles spoken by their voice actors, outtakes, and most of the features found in its predecessor.

Ryo Takamisaki also wrote The King of Fighters G, a manga that retells the events of the game, following Athena Asamiya.

== Reception ==
Reception

Review scores
Publication	Score
Electronic Gaming Monthly	7.5/10
Nintendo Life	7/10
Capsule Monsters	7.5/10
Terminal Gamer	8/10
DefunctGames	B-

Award
Publication	Award
Electronic Gaming Monthly	Neo Geo Game of the Year

=== Sales ===
In Japan, Game Machine listed The King of Fighters '96 in their September 1, 1996 issue as being the most-successful arcade game of the month. According to Famitsu, the AES version sold over 33,323 copies in its first week on the market. Electronic Gaming Monthly editors named The King of Fighters '96 their Neo Geo Game of the Year, calling it "an excellent packaged deal for any fan of 2-D sprite-based fighting games", beating Metal Slug, Real Bout Fatal Fury and Neo Turf Masters GameSpot noted that the game helped start "a modest resurgence in the sales of AES consoles and cartridges." During its release week, the Sega Saturn port of the game sold 109,752 copies in Japan. As of 2004, the sales had gone to 155,116.

=== Critical response ===
The game received both praise and criticism from video game publications, which commented on its new additions in regard to gameplay and characters. The four reviewers of Electronic Gaming Monthly gave the Neo Geo AES version a 7.5 out of 10, citing the huge roster of fighters and retention of the series's strong playability. Game Master Mook regarded it as the most fun fighting game from the franchise at the time of its release thanks to the new mechanics, such as Max Mode, and also praised its new characters. In regard to the Orochi Collection, Nintendo Life said that while The King of Fighters '96 and The King of Fighters '97 were more enjoyable than the previous games, they were still overshadowed by The King of Fighters '98, which was considered the best game in the entire franchise. 1UP.com noted the game to be unbalanced in comparison to its prequel, stating that projectile attacks needed to be improved. The emulated Virtual Console release for Wii obtained a good review by Nintendo Life based on the improvements SNK added to the title, such as balancing the gameplay and the movements of characters; however, the review also criticized the audio. HardcoreGaming noted that several characters had aerial techniques which added more variety to the cast, despite still failing to balance the cast. Nevertheless, HardcoreGaming praised the new gameplay elements that made the game unique when compared to the previous two installments. Upon being ported to the PlayStation 3, Akihabara noted that the biggest feature that every player would be looking forward to using would be the Online Mode, and added that the game still stood out in modern times, thanks to its variety of playable characters.

The presentation of the game was a subject of both praise and criticism. Dan Hsu and Sushi-X both criticized it for failing to improve graphically over the previous installment, and thereby keep up with contemporary 2D fighting series such as Street Fighter. PlayStation LifeStyle praised the focus of the narrative, as the relationship between the two protagonists, Kyo Kusanagi and Iori Yagami, is further elaborated upon and new characters were created to explore such lore. However, the writer noted that the arc would not be finished until the following installment. Zentendo.com writer Chuck Allen praised the improvements in music and voice acting, such as the announcer's voice, which is "audible and understandable". He also praised the addition of new characters to the cast, as well as the boss Goenitz, who is easier to defeat than Rugal Bernstein from KOF '95. In retrospect, the plot was well-received for how the two rivals Kyo and Iori joined forces for the first time despite their antagonism, which went on to create a major impact in SNK history thanks to the appeal of these two fighters. 1UP.com and HardcoreGaming liked the additions of Vice and Mature, the new Boss Team composed of famous SNK villains, the special introductions between related characters, and the custom endings and winposes.

=== Legacy ===
The King of Fighters game designer Toyohisa Tanabe wanted to work on a new Art of Fighting installment using the engine of The King of Fighters '96 engine but was not given permission by his superior. The popularity of the previous version of Kyo Kusanagi often led to SNK adding in sequels the idea to play as him alternatively.
