= The King of Fighters =

Fighting video game franchise

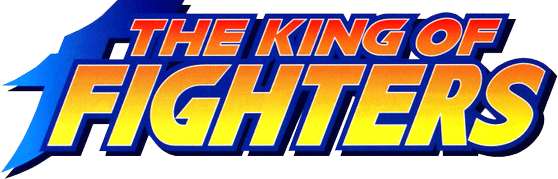
- Genre: Fighting
- Developers: SNK; Eolith; BrezzaSoft; Noise Factory; KOF Studio
- Publishers: SNK; Ignition Entertainment; Atlus USA; Rising Star Games; Deep Silver; Koch Media
- Creator: Masanori Kuwasashi
- Platforms: Arcade, Neo Geo AES, Neo Geo CD, Neo Geo Pocket, Neo Geo Pocket Color, Sega Saturn, Dreamcast, PlayStation, PlayStation 2, PlayStation Portable, PlayStation 3, PlayStation 4, PlayStation 5, PlayStation Vita, PlayStation Network, Game Boy, J2ME, Symbian, Game Boy Advance, Wii, Nintendo Switch, Virtual Console, iOS, Android, Microsoft Windows, Xbox, Xbox 360, Xbox One, Xbox Series X/S
- First release: The King of Fighters '94; August 25, 1994
- Latest release: The King of Fighters XV; February 17, 2022

The King of Fighters (KOF) (Note: Japanese title: Za Kingu Obu Faitāzu (ザ・キング・オブ・ファイターズ)) is a series of fighting games by SNK. It is a crossover featuring characters from various video game series created by the company, as well as original characters created specifically for the series created by Masanori Kuwasashi. The series began with the release of The King of Fighters '94 in 1994, which was initially developed for SNK's Neo Geo MVS arcade hardware and received yearly installments up until its tenth entry, The King of Fighters 2003 — thereafter, SNK moved away from annual The King of Fighters releases and games adopted a Roman numbered format, while simultaneously retiring the use of Neo Geo. The first major installment after this change was The King of Fighters XI (2005) on the Atomiswave arcade board. The series' most recent arcade hardware is the Taito Type X^{2}, first used with the release of The King of Fighters XII (2009) and continues with the latest entry in the series, The King of Fighters XV (2022).

The games' story focuses on the title tournament involving fighters from multiple SNK games. SNK also created original characters to serve as protagonists starting with newcomer Kyo Kusanagi heir of a clan destined to save the world from the Yamata no Orochi demon and fighting characters from Fatal Fury and Art of Fighting, among other titles. Later arcs focused on other characters such as K' who can wield fire like Kyo following experiments by the NESTS terrorist organization, Ash Crimson, a trickster interested in obtaining the Three Sacred Treasures and Shun'ei, a young fighter whose powers open the world to other dimensions.

Multiple spin-off games, such as the R duology for the Neo Geo Pocket and Maximum Impact for the PlayStation 2, for example, have also been released. Ports of the arcade games have been released for several video game consoles. There have been multiple cross-over games in which the SNK cast interacted with characters created by Capcom, while some characters have been present as guest characters in other games, such as Mai Shiranui in the Dead or Alive games and Street Fighter 6, Geese Howard in Tekken 7, Kula Diamond in Dead or Alive 6, and Terry Bogard in Fighting EX Layer, Super Smash Bros. Ultimate, and Street Fighter 6.

Critical reception of the video games have been generally positive with their use of teams and balanced gameplay often cited.

== Games ==
=== Main series ===
Release timeline
1994	The King of Fighters '94
1995	The King of Fighters '95
1996	The King of Fighters '96
1997	The King of Fighters '97
1998	The King of Fighters '98
1998	King of Fighters R-1
1999	The King of Fighters '99
1999	King of Fighters R-2
2000	The King of Fighters 2000
2001	The King of Fighters 2001
2002	The King of Fighters EX: Neo Blood
2002	The King of Fighters 2002
2003	The King of Fighters EX2: Howling Blood
2003	The King of Fighters 2003
2004	The King of Fighters: Maximum Impact
2004	The King of Fighters: Neowave
2005	The King of Fighters XI
2006	KOF: Maximum Impact 2
2007	Maximum Impact: Regulation A
2008	The King of Fighters '98 Ultimate Match
2009	The King of Fighters XII
2009	The King of Fighters 2002 Unlimited Match
2010	The King of Fighters XIII
2011	The King of Fighters '98 Ultimate Match Final Edition
2012–2015
2016	The King of Fighters XIV
2017–2021
2022	The King of Fighters XV

- SNK released the first game in the series, The King of Fighters '94, on August 25, 1994. It featured characters from SNK's previous fighting game series Fatal Fury and Art of Fighting, as well as original characters (including characters from other franchises such as Ikari Warriors and Psycho Soldier, adapted for a versus fighting game). The game's success led SNK to release yearly installments for the series numbering the games for the year they were released.
- The King of Fighters '95, as well as adding new characters, began the series' first story arc titled "The Orochi Saga". It was also the first game in the series that allowed players to create their own three-member teams with any character in the game.
- The King of Fighters '96 established the second part of "The Orochi Saga". Depending on the playable characters on a team, an exclusive ending would be played.
- "The Orochi Saga" story arc concluded in The King of Fighters '97.
- Unlike the series' previous games, The King of Fighters '98 did not feature a story. Instead, it was promoted as a "Dream Match" game that allowed players to choose most of the characters available from the previous titles, including ones that were supposedly dead. SNK refitted the Dreamcast version and renamed it The King of Fighters: Dream Match 1999 with an extended cel animated introduction and 3D backgrounds.
- The King of Fighters '99 introduced "The NESTS Chronicles" story arc. In a new tactic, a specific person from a team would be an assistant called a "Striker". This person would be able to aid the team for a few seconds in combat. The Dreamcast version was titled The King of Fighters: Evolution, with several improvements in the game such as new Strikers and better animation.
- The King of Fighters 2000 is the second part of "The NESTS Saga" as well as the last KOF game produced by SNK before its bankruptcy. It adds a few new playable characters and a couple of Strikers—most from earlier KOF titles and other SNK franchises such as Metal Slug, Robo Army, Burning Fight, Buriki One, The Last Blade, Savage Reign and Kizuna Encounter.
- The King of Fighters 2001 ends the second story arc. The Korean company Eolith helped develop the game after SNK was declared bankrupt.
- The King of Fighters 2002 was created to reunite old characters from previous KOF games and featured no story, similar to KOF '98. It was also developed by Eolith.
- A new KOF story arc titled the "Tales of Ash" began in The King of Fighters 2003, the last KOF game to be released for the Neo Geo system. It allowed players to change characters while playing, but the number of team members was reduced to three. SNK returned to develop the franchise with this entry. By 2004, SNK abandoned the series' yearly releases and numbered future games in a more conventional manner.
- The first main series' game released as such was The King of Fighters XI in 2005.
- In 2009, The King of Fighters XII was released. It used high-resolution, hand-drawn 2D sprites on detailed 2D backgrounds. It is a storyless gathering of fighters, similar to KOF '98 and 2002.
- The story arc ends with The King of Fighters XIII. Released during the summer of 2010, which features the entire roster from The King of Fighters XII as well as additional characters.
- The King of Fighters XIV, featuring 3D graphics and a large roster of characters while also establishing a new story arc was released for the PlayStation 4 on August 23, 2016.
- In December 2018, SNK revealed it was working on The King of Fighters XV, and was released on February 17, 2022.

=== Spin-offs and remakes ===
- The King of Fighters '94 was remade and released in 2004 for the PlayStation 2 as The King of Fighters '94 Re-Bout in Japan. This version has several new features like hi-res graphics, online play, team edit, a playable Rugal Bernstein, and the addition of Saisyu Kusanagi.
- An update of KOF '98 titled The King of Fighters '98 Ultimate Match was released in Japanese arcades in 2008 and later on some video game consoles expanding the character roster and improving the graphics.
- A remake of KOF 2002, titled The King of Fighters 2002 Unlimited Match was released for the PlayStation 2 in 2009 in Japan. SNK also produced a game titled The King of Fighters: Battle de Paradise which could be connected to the Japanese Dreamcast port of KOF '99.
- Yumekobo developed the visual novel game with strategy and RPG elements for fights known as The King of Fighters: Kyo, adapting a manga with the same name. The game follows Kyo's daily life as he prepares to fight in the tournament in KOF '97 while interacting with other rivals.
- For the Neo Geo Pocket, an adaptation of KOF '97 titled King of Fighters R-1 was released on October 28, 1998. A sequel for the Neo Geo Pocket Color, King of Fighters R-2 an adaptation of KOF '98, was released on March 19, 1999.
- In 2004, SNK produced the first 3D installment of the series, The King of Fighters: Maximum Impact. The game and its sequel KOF: Maximum Impact 2, and its upgraded version Maximum Impact: Regulation A, revises much of the backstory for the characters and settings from previous games. A second update called Regulation A2 was planned but cancelled. The producer of the Maximum Impact series, Falcoon, stated that the Maximum Impact games are in a different continuity from the original series of games. Another spin-off video game, The King of Fighters Neowave, was released for the Xbox, PlayStation 2 and Arcade during 2005 and 2006. Neowave is essentially a remix of KOF 2002, with a new presentation and a few roster changes. Like KOF2002, Neowave has no storyline and is considered a "dream match". Tomokazu Nakano created the character artwork.
- Two video games were released for the Game Boy Advance titled The King of Fighters EX: Neo-Blood and The King of Fighters EX2: Howling Blood featuring characters and backgrounds from KOF '99 and 2000, respectively. The GBA games featured some exclusive content such as new stages and exclusive characters such as Moe Habana, introduced in EX: Neo-Blood, while EX2: Howling Blood featured more exclusive characters, including a new end boss. The data was based on the DC version of The King of Fighters '99 and put into The King of Fighters 2000 system. However, the game's quality was terrible according to Akihiko Ureshino.
- A role-playing video game was also created exclusively for the PlayStation under the title The King of Fighters: Kyo. An N-Gage version of the second Game Boy Advance game was released in 2005 titled The King of Fighters Extreme, which added Bluetooth multiplayer capability.
- By late 2000s, at least three pachislot games were developed for the series. The first, The King of Fighters, is based on the Orochi storyline; the second, The King of Fighters 2, is based on the fight of K' against the NESTS cartel; and the third, Maximum Impact focuses on the series' 3D titles. None of these was released outside Japan. At least six games for Japanese mobile phones have also been developed. While a few of them are fighting games, others are mini-games like volleyball and quizzes.

=== Related games ===
Several characters from the series also appear in crossover video games. Neo Geo Battle Coliseum is a 2-on-2 tag team fighting game for the Atomiswave arcade board, and SNK Gals' Fighters is a fighting game for the Neo Geo Pocket Color. Along with the KOF, characters from other SNK series also star in both of these games. A rhythm game titled The Rhythm of Fighters was released for mobile phone games during 2015. Capcom also produced a series of similar crossover fighting games with SNK. The SNK-produced fighting games of this crossover include the Dimps-developed portable fighting game SNK vs. Capcom: The Match of the Millennium for the Neo Geo Pocket Color in 1999 and SNK vs. Capcom: SVC Chaos for the Neo Geo in 2003. The games produced by Capcom are Capcom vs. SNK in 2000. This was followed by a minor upgrade, Capcom vs. SNK Pro, and a sequel titled Capcom vs. SNK 2, both released in 2001. The three games were produced for NAOMI hardware and later ported to various consoles. SNK also produced SNK vs. Capcom: SVC Chaos, and the video game card game titled SNK vs. Capcom: Card Fighters DS.

Multiple mobile phone games have also been produced including The King of Fighters All Star, Kimi wa Hero, Clash of Kings, KOF X Arena Masters, KOF: WORLD, The King of Fighters Orochi Go, The King of Cyphers, and a crossover with Fatal Fury. An otome game King of Fighters for Girls is also in development. The characters have also been guests in other mobile games such as Kyo in Fighting Days.

=== Compilations ===
In addition to the remakes of games such as KOF '94 Re-bout, KOF '98 Ultimate Match, and KOF 2002 Unlimited Match, SNK has released compilations of their KOF games. Two KOF compilations were released in Japan for the PlayStation 2 as part of the Neo Geo Online Collection.

The first compilation, The King of Fighters Orochi Hen (ザ·キング·オブ·ファイターズ -オロチ編-; The Orochi Saga) features KOF '95, KOF '96, and KOF '97, the three games comprising the Orochi story arc. The compilation features a Color Edit mode that allows the player to create a custom color palette for every character in each game, the choice to play each game with original and arranged soundtracks, and an online versus mode which supports the Multi-Matching BB (MMBB) service. The second compilation, The King of Fighters NESTS Hen (ザ·キング·オブ·ファイターズ -ネスツ編-; The NESTS Saga), features the original Neo Geo versions of KOF '99, KOF 2000, and KOF 2001, as well as the corresponding Dreamcast versions of each game. It has the same features as the previous compilation but with online support available only for the Dreamcast games in the compilation.

A separately produced compilation titled The King of Fighters Collection: The Orochi Saga was released for the PlayStation 2, PlayStation Portable and Wii outside of Japan. This compilation has the same lineup of games as the Japanese Orochi Hen, along with KOF '94 and KOF '98. The extra features are different. There is an added Challenge Mode where the player must win certain matches against the CPU in KOF '98 under specific conditions, a media gallery featuring listenable tracks from each game, and a collection of official illustrations.

There were also two double-pack compilations, the first being The King of Fighters 2000/2001 (The King of Fighters: The Saga Continues in PAL regions) and The King of Fighters 2002/2003, both on the PlayStation 2 with first compilation disk KoF 2000/2001 on xbox being cancelled.

== Gameplay elements ==
A fight between Kyo (an original character) and Sie Kensou (Psycho Soldier).

The basic gameplay system of KOF is similar to SNK's previous games like the Fatal Fury series, Art of Fighting and Samurai Shodown. The game uses a four attack button configuration like Fatal Fury 2 and Fatal Fury Special, that consists of light punch, light kick, strong punch and strong kick. Like Fatal Fury 2, specialized techniques are performed by pressing buttons in combination, allowing the player to dodge an opponent's attack or to launch a character's powerful knockdown attack. As with most other fighting games, each character has a set of basic, unique, and special moves the player can perform using a specific series of joystick and button inputs. Each new installment provides new ways to create stronger attacks such as The King of Fighters '97. Instead of charging the Power Gauge it is now filled when the player strikes the opponent or by performing Special Moves. The player can stock up to three Power Gauges. The player can use one stock of the Power Gauge to perform a Super Special Move or enter a "MAX" mode, in which the player's defensive and offensive strength are increased. Performing a Super Special Move while in MAX mode allows the player to perform a more powerful Super Special Move.

The franchise is known for innovating the fighting genre by replacing a traditional round-based format used in preceding fighting games with a format consisting of 3-on-3 team-based matches dubbed the Team Battle System. Instead of choosing a single character, the player selects from one of eight available teams, each consisting of three members. Before each match, the players choose the order in which their team members enter the battle. When the match begins, the members chosen to go first on their respective teams will fight. When one character is defeated, the next member of the same team will take his or her place, while the character on the other team will have a small portion of their life restored (if energy was lost during the previous round). If a character is losing a match against the opponent, then the player can call one of the remaining teammates standing on the sidelines to jump in and perform a support attack. The match ends when all three members of either team lose.

Three games—The King of Fighters '99, 2000, and 2001—added the idea of each team being given an extra character that can assist the player to produce more attacks or combos against the enemy. While 2002 brought back the classic 3-o- 3 teams, 2003 and XI made the change so that each team switches fighters in the middle of combat with one of them being a "Leader" character who can perform stronger techniques. Later games, however, returned to the classic way of fighting while still delivering different ways and rules of fighting.

== Plot and characters ==
The King of Fighters employs different original characters as leads featuring (from left to right) K', Ash Crimson, Shun'ei and Kyo Kusanagi.

The titular King of Fighters tournament originated from SNK's previous fighting game franchises, Fatal Fury and Art of Fighting (canonically and chronologically beginning during the events of Art of Fighting 2). The first game in the series, KOF '94, centers on a black market arms dealer named Rugal Bernstein, who hosts a well-known fighting tournament to lure worthy adversaries into his trap so that he can kill them and turn them into stone statues, adding them to his collection of defeated martial artists. In addition to previously established fighting game stars Terry Bogard and Ryo Sakazaki, the game introduces a new hero: a young Japanese martial artist named Kyo Kusanagi, who serves as the lead character in the early KOF games. In making Kyo, SNK wanted his personality to contrast with those of earlier leads and stand out within the crossover.

In KOF '95, Rugal, having survived the previous tournament, hosts a new one with the intention of seeking revenge against his adversaries. KOF '95 introduced Kyo's rival Iori Yagami to the series. It was the first game to mention the presence of the Orochi clan, which would serve as the central plot element in the series' following two games. The tournaments in KOF '96 and KOF '97 are hosted by a woman named Chizuru Kagura, who seeks to recruit allies (particularly Kyo and Iori, who are descended from the Three Divine Vessels along with Kagura herself) to fight against the Orochi clan. The Orochi storyline concludes in KOF '97. The next game in the series, KOF '98, is a "Special Edition" with no plot development.

KOF '99 introduces a new story arc involving a mysterious corporation known as NESTS, which seeks to create an army of genetically altered fighters. The game introduces a new lead character named K', a fugitive from NESTS who was genetically enhanced with Kyo's DNA. The next two games in the series, KOF 2000 and KOF 2001, continue the NESTS story line, with each game unraveling the mystery of the organization further. KOF 2002, like KOF '98 before it, is a "Special Edition" of the series with no particular plot. Like Kyo, K' was created as a different hero. Rather than the cocky Kyo, K' is a dark hero who reluctantly fights against the NESTS syndicate.

KOF 2003 begins a new story line focusing on another new lead character named Ash Crimson, a young man who seeks to possess the powers of the Three Divine Vessels for his own unknown agenda. Similar to K', Ash is given a different characterization acting as a villain during his story arc. The tournaments in KOF 2003 and KOF XI were hosted by "Those From the Past", an organization of inhuman warriors who try to break the Orochi seal to take its powers so they can give them to their shrouded master. While KOF XII does not have a story, KOF XIII follows another tournament hosted by them where Ash eventually confronts their superior despite him being Ash's ancestor.

KOF XIV establishes a new storyline involving a new lead character named Shun'ei. Described as a "kind-hearted" person, SNK states that while Shun'ei is not a new main character, he is still important for the saga.

== Development ==
=== 1990s ===
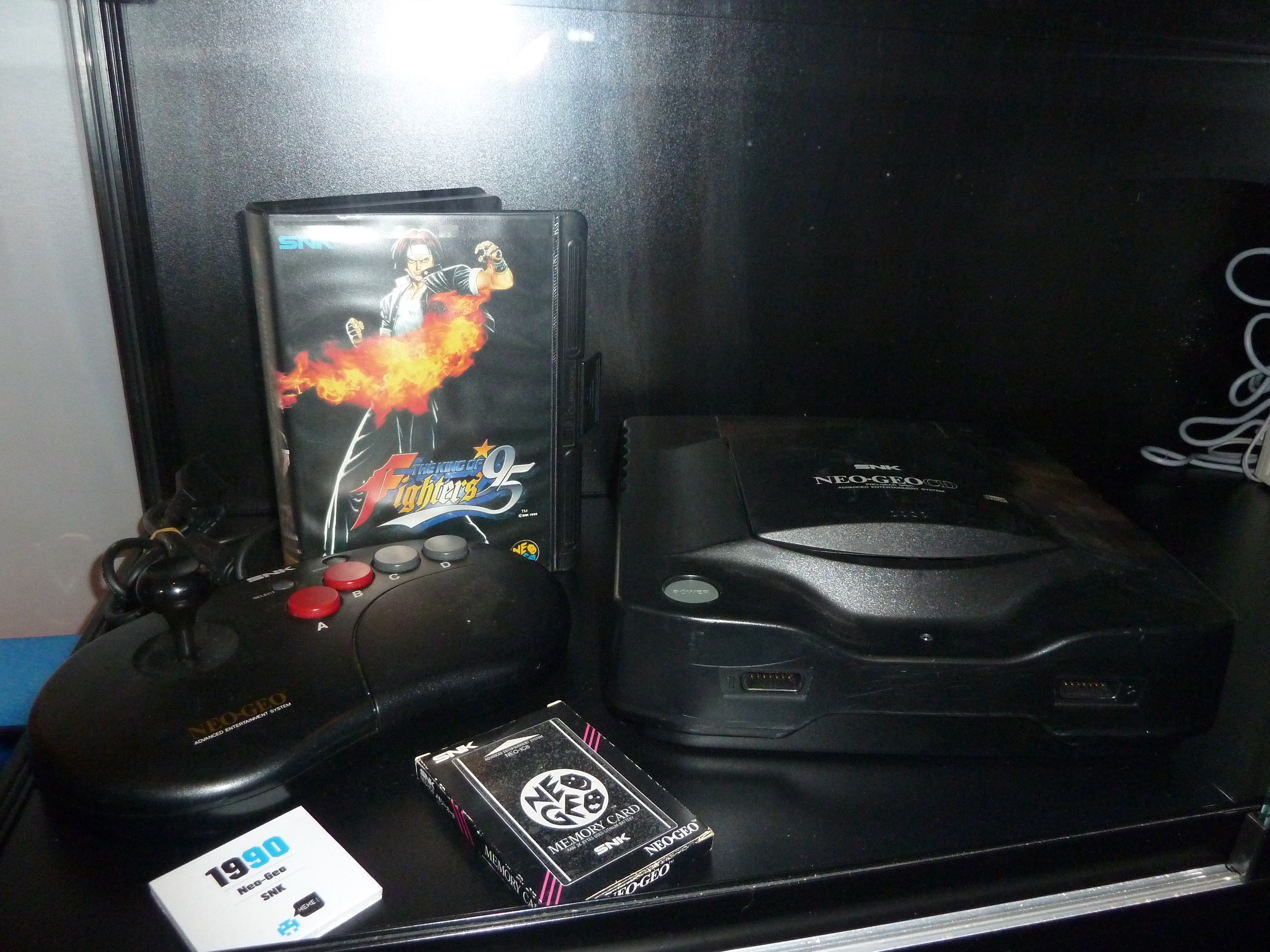
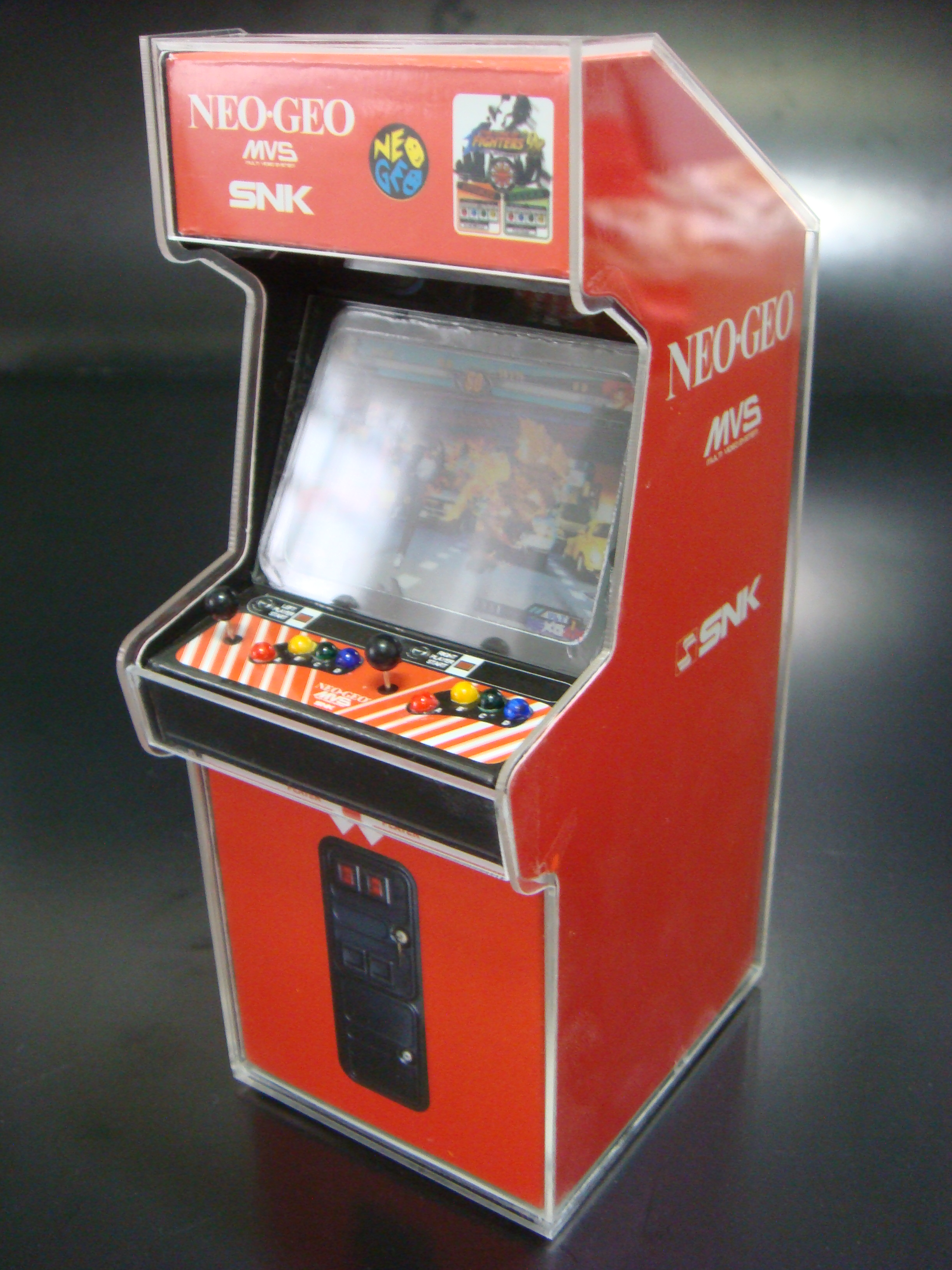
An example of the Neo Geo CD port of The King of Fighters '95 featuring main character Kyo Kusanagi by Shinkiro. (left) and an example of an arcade cabinet of the game The King of Fighters '98

The King of Fighters was originally conceptualized as a side-scrolling beat 'em up until SNK changed it to a fighting game that took its subtitle from the first Fatal Fury game: Fatal Fury: King of Fighters. The King of Fighters was created by game designer Masanori Kuwasashi. After working on package design for electronic products, he decided that he would leave to pursue a different career in the video game industry. SNK recruited much of its new staff back in the 1980s and early 1990s. Kuwasashi, Tanabe and Shimizu - under the stewardship of Nishiyama - would go on to form the core of a game development team. The prototype version of the game was a River City Ransom-style TEAM-BATTLE side-scrolling beat 'em up. However, the idea was eventually abandoned. They eventually decided to turn their idea into a fighting game. This game was a team battle concept and there were not enough characters, so characters from Fatal Fury, Art of Fighting, Ikari Warriors and Psycho Soldier were also added to the roster. The concept of a three-person team was one of the ideas kept from the side-scrolling version. The title The King of Fighters was re-used from the subtitle of the first Fatal Fury game, Fatal Fury: King of Fighters. The King of Fighters series' director Toyohisa Tanabe asserted that the Art of Fighting and Fatal Fury fighters were added specifically for adults. The newer KOF characters were intended to appeal to younger and recent audiences. Characters like Benimaru Nikaido and Chang Koehan were added to provide an off-beat variety to the cast, which he had previously said was too serious. A major inspiration for this crossover idea was the usage of Ryo Sakazaki from Art of Fighting as a guest character in Fatal Fury Special; Bringing Ryo to Fatal Fury revolutioned the idea of the crossover concept that would conceptualize The King of Fighters. In the making of the game The King of Fighters '94, director Masanori Kuwasashi expressed pressure about creating a young lead who would clash with SNK veteran fighters but after talking producer Takashi Nishiyama, he thought it would be beneficial for sales. This led to the creation of the protagonist Kyo Kusanagi inspired by the Yamata no Orochi legend, which was the basis of the story arc of the series. As the first game had little budget or deadline, it reduced the strest the developers had. He believed the game would not be popular so he did not care about using other IPs either. However, with the sudden success of The King of Fighters '94 that surprised him himself, Kuwasasashi received complaints about using other SNK characters.

While the first two games used the Neo Geo MVS arcade, The King of Fighters '96 includes 68 KB of video RAM and 64 KB of RAM. This made The King of Fighters '96 the first game to break the technical limits of the MVS system. SNK staff members noted that due to the great popularity of some of the series' characters, it is difficult to design new ones that might have the same appeal. This also happens during location tests of new games. During the mid-1990s, The King of Fighters was SNK's most popular IP as their other famous works like Art of Fighting 3 and Fatal Fury 3 were poorly received by the gamers. Though Fatal Fury saw a revival through Real Bout Fatal Fury and Garou: Mark of the Wolves, these two games were released during the time SNK went bankrupt leaving the company to mainly focus on KOF. The artist known as Shinkiro was responsible for the first artwork involving the cast. As a result, newcomer artist Hiroaki Hashimoto felt for his debut that he needed to draw appealing characters, despite his inexperience. There has also been censorship of some of the ports of the North American games, most notably Whip's gun and blood.

=== 2000s ===
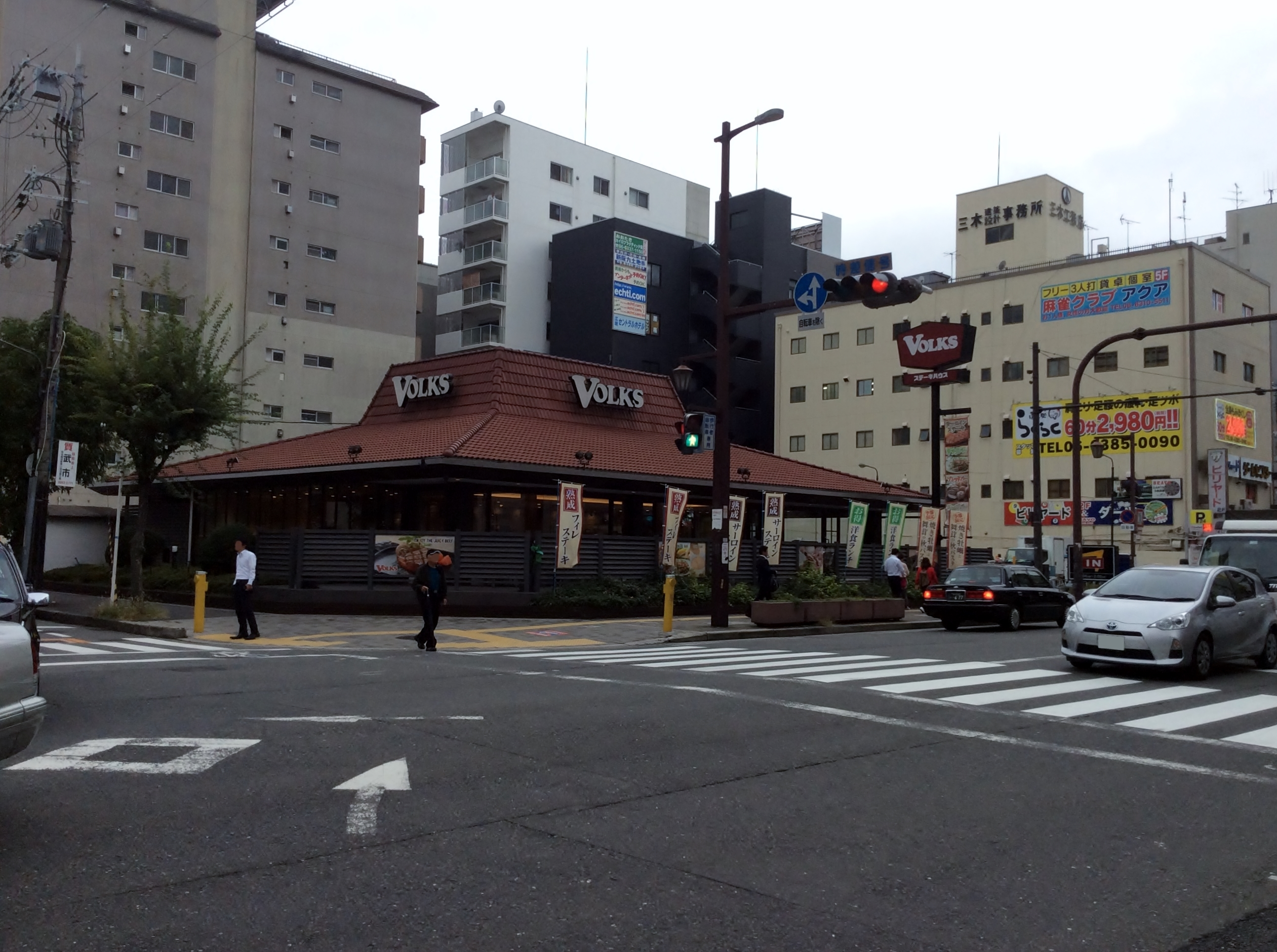
Stages like Esaka were designed to be faithful to the real world especially since that is the location where SNK's developers worked.

For the first time, former producer Takashi Nishiyama was not on the team for The King of Fighters 2000 which caused the team some concern. Despite early unease over the game's state, SNK was pleased with the outcome and described it as an appealing arcade game. Mexican company Evoga had a major influence on the games due to the franchise's popularity within Latin America. In 2000, SNK went bankrupt. Eolith negotiated a license agreement in the same year to keep producing the KOF series because of the franchise's popularity in Korea and worldwide. BrezzaSoft assisted Eolith with the game's production. Fearing disappointing returning fans, Eolith decided to maintain most of the common parts from The King of Fighters while adding new elements to it. One of the biggest changes is the optional use of Strikers where players can use between one and three characters to assist the playable one. The team aimed to refine the original gameplay system of earlier KOF games. While conducting a popularity poll of the characters, Eolith still aimed to include the least popular teams in the game. The great popularity of Kyo Kusanagi and Iori Yagami led to their immediate inclusion in the game. References to works from Evoga can be seen in the game's scenarios. While working on it, the team played The King of Fighters '98 for the developers to see if they could include a character within the game. A member from Evoga won, resulting in the team asking to add Angel to the game. Starting in 2003, the games were again developed by SNK, now called SNK Playmore. SNK Playmore discontinued the AES system in 2003, preferring to publish video games in cooperation with Sammy, using its Atomiswave arcade board, which provided a more secure, modern platform for new arcade releases. This allowed the new KOF games to feature better audio and graphics than earlier games.

The gameplay from the NESTS story arc led to negative feedback resulting in The King of Fighters 2002 going back to the original handling of teams, while The King of Fighters 2003 implements a new system that allows swapping members to make the gameplay easier to handle. The last of these yearly releases was The King of Fighters 2003. In December 2004, Falcoon, the series' main illustrator, mentioned that the next game the SNK Playmore staff were trying to release was different from The King of Fighters: Maximum Impact or what could have been a The King of Fighters 2004. The game's development began when SNK staff finished making Neo Geo Battle Coliseum.

=== 2010s onwards ===
KOF 2003 would be followed by XI. Developers sought to make the levels as realistic as possible, with particular focus paid to the Esaka stage. The company planned to add more stages, but these were removed due to time constraints. XII and XIII which had major changes to appeal to the audience. XII received a major overhaul when dealing with the sprites. Though KOF XIII was received favorably, SNK put the franchise on hiatus for several years.

The decision to create The King of Fighters XIV was made when SNK Playmore's CEO Eikichi Kawasaki decided the company should return to producing appealing fighting games rather than Pachinko-Slot Machines and Mobile Apps. While it took some time, full production of the game began when more staff from Esaka joined the team in April 2014. Yasuyuki Oda was the game's director. This was his first contribution to the franchise, leading a younger staff. During his first employment at SNK, games like Virtua Fighter motivated him to make a 3D game after he had left SNK. When Oda returned to SNK, there was never any debate about transitioning the series transition from 2D to 3D, though adapting some of the characters proved more difficult than others. Many of SNK's staff consider KOF '98 and KOF 2002 the best games in the franchise. They gave them ideas to create new entries in the series that would surpass the quality of these two games. During a contest, SNK used the DLC character Najd based on the Saudi Arabian artist Mashael. SNK Chairman Zhihui Ge expressed a desire to attract more Middle Eastern fans to play the game. He also hired new creators during the post-release of XIV. In retrospect, Oda said the SNK game studio was revived with KOFXIV, resulting in the company finally making more Samurai Shodowns, Fatal Fury and Art of Fighting games in future years. Oda wishes the company could keep doing this.

SNK decided to make XV while they were still working on XIV but only started development after Samurai Shodown was completed. Feeling the previous title had outdated graphics for a 2016 game, SNK chairman Zhihui Ge said that XV would the Unreal Engine 4 to provide a better presentation. Oda has compared Shun'ei to Rock Howard, and says that his story could end up being as fun to write as Rock's. Oda feels that unlike the older fighting game protagonists, Shun'ei has a one-of-a-kind world view, and his values change as he grows older.

== Related media ==
=== Japanese works ===
Multiple manga adaptation of The King of Fighters. have been written. Akihiko Ureshino also wrote multiple novelizations based on the games with different artists contributing to each installment. A light novel series Iori Yagami's Isekai Mu'sou by Nobuhiko Tenkawa which debuted in July 2019. The art was done by Eisuke Ogura. Centered after the events of KOF '97, Iori finds himself into another world.

=== Chinese works ===
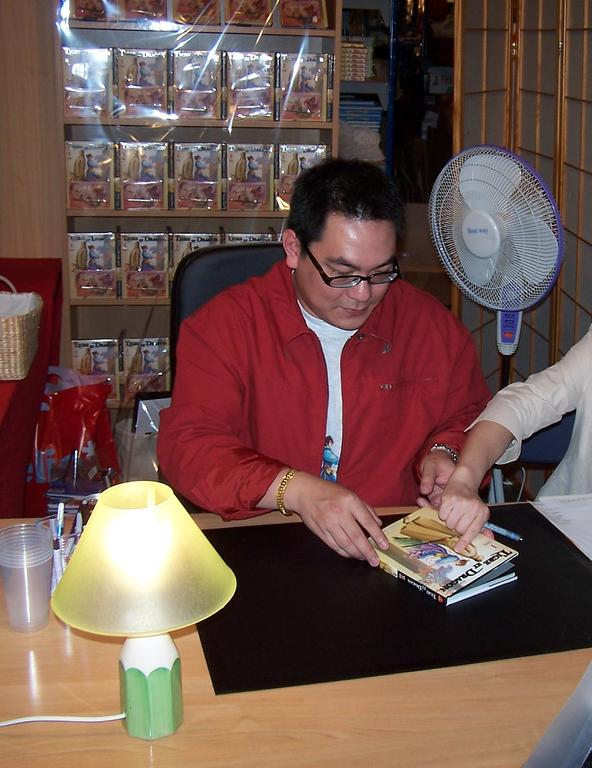
Author Andy Seto

A manhua adaptation of KOF titled The King of Fighters: Zillion was created by Andy Seto. In 1999, Chinese writer Seto created his own company named NEOSON, and then started writing the comic The King of Fighter: Zillion as publisher friend who held the rights of the series suggested it to him. SNK provided Seto directions in the making of the comic. In contrast to previous The King of Fighters comics, Zillion is mostly an original story. It is set 1998, which is somewhat "free" in terms of the official storyline. Andy Seto claims that given that it was 1998, the Japanese team at SNK required me to write a story about that period. When working with SNK he has have much less freedom in my choices and has to have to get their approval first before doing anything. In contrast Zillion gave Seto more freedom. The series was published in China for forty-five volumes all written by Andy Seto. The first volume was released on February 1, 1999. ComicsOne published some issues to Western regions alongside Seto's other work, Crouching Tiger & Hidden Dragon. In France, the comic was published by TONKAM. An artbook titled The Illustrations Of The King Of Fighters Zillion was also released in 2000.

Hong Kong artists Wing Yang and King Tung produced further manhua for the games, beginning with The King of Fighters 2001 through 2003 along with the Maximum Impact series. Both authors also made a sequel, The King of Fighters 03: Xenon Zero (拳皇 XENON ZERO), to conclude the 2003 tournament. ComicsOne licensed the series with its first volume tying in with the release of a new video game and kept publishing it after their transition to DrMaster. They were published in five issues of 128 pages from May 25, 2005, to June 26, 2008. Another manhua series is King of Fighters RX Project '00 (拳皇RX) in three volumes that was officially sponsored by SNK-Playmore Hong Kong. The NESTS saga version was illustrated by Ricky, and covers the fight against NESTS primarily focused on the 2000 tournament.

=== Film and animation ===
A short series based on KOF titled The King of Fighters: Another Day was released in 2005. Production I.G produced the title as an original net animation with a total of four episodes, each about 10 minutes in length. It has since been released as a bonus DVD, packaged with KOF: Maximum Impact 2. An English-language live-action film The King of Fighters was released direct-to-DVD in the United States in 2010. New anime and live-action drama productions were announced in 2016.

The CG anime series The King of Fighters: Destiny was released on Steam and YouTube beginning in 2017. The first season retells the story of the first games with Kyo Kusanagi leading the Japan Team to participate in the title tournament, eventually encountering the host, Rugal, who is using the power of the mythical creature Orochi. The series has received over 800 million views.

=== CDs ===
SNK has released a series of CD soundtracks titled SNK Character Sounds Collection or SNK Sound Character Collection (SNKサウンドキャラクターズコレクション). As of 2008, there are 11 volumes; each one focuses on a single character. The CDs have different versions of the characters' themes, as well as quotes. Most of the albums' covers are illustrated by Masato Natsumoto. The Band of Fighters, shortened as BOF, is a character image band that includes Kyo Kusanagi, Iori Yagami, Terry Bogard, Nakoruru and Athena Asamiya.

Dengeki Bunko and Pony Canyon have released several radio drama CDs based on the series. Some of them are direct adaptations of the video games KOF '94 to KOF '00. Another CD is Iori Yagami Original Drama the Setting Sun and Moon ~ Prologue (八神庵オリジナルドラマ 夕陽と月〜プロローグ〜), which is centered on Iori Yagami. The drama originally aired on the Game Dra Night and Neo Chupi and was then released by Pony Canyon CD on July 7, 1999. The guidebook The King of Fighters Perfect Reader includes the bonus CD drama KOF: Mid Summer Struggle. There are two stories on it—one is serious the other is a parody focused on KOF '03. The scenarios were developed by Akihiko Ureshino and BoHyou. SNK also gave away a four-CD soundtrack featuring songs from past KOF games with the pre-order of KOF XIII on any GameStop in the United States.

=== Other merchandise ===
In December 2006, Sabertooth Games released a King of Fighters 2006 set along with Samurai Shodown V for its Universal Fighting System (UFS) collectible card game; character starter packs were released for Terry Bogard and Mai Shiranui. Other merchandise includes a number of figures and statues, mostly of Mai. Additionally, scale figures based on Kyo's and Iori's original forms and their XIV looks have been released, including a Nendoroid figure based on Kyo.

== Reception ==
Aggregate review scores (main titles)
Game	GameRankings	Metacritic
The King of Fighters '95	PS1: 69%	—
The King of Fighters '97	iOS: 72%	—
The King of Fighters '98	DC: 71% (Dream Match 1999); PS2: 77% (Ultimate Match); X360: 74% (Ultimate Match) iOS: 77% NS: 80%	PS2: 78/100 (Ultimate Match) iOS: 78/100
The King of Fighters '99	PS1: 75% DC: 76% (Evolution)	DC: 67/100 (Evolution)
The King of Fighters 2000 / 2001 (dual-pack)	PS2: 72%	PS2: 71/100
The King of Fighters 2002 / 2003 (dual-pack)	PS2: 75% Xbox: 75%	PS2: 73/100
The King of Fighters XI	PS2: 73%	PS2: 75/100
The King of Fighters XII	X360: 64% PS3: 60%	X360: 63/100; PS3: 57/100
The King of Fighters XIII	X360: 82% PS3: 77% WIN: 76% (Climax/Steam Edition)	X360: 79/100; PS3: 77/100; WIN: 77/100 (Climax/Steam Edition)
The King of Fighters XIV	PS4: 79%	PS4: 79/100
The King of Fighters XV	—	PS5: 79/100; PS4: 80/100; WIN: 85/100; XSXS: 79/100

=== Popularity ===
Ben Herman, president of SNK Playmore USA, commented that although he received complaints about the English voices for the game, Maximum Impact sold over 100,000 units as of May 2006, becoming a commercial success. The Mexican company Evoga had a major influence on the game due to the franchise's popularity in Latin America and often playtested the games. The popularity of the franchise in those markets has been attributed mainly to economic factors - machines featuring King of Fighters series were often cheaper and more easily accessible than those featuring competing titles from other companies. Following the release of The King of Fighters 2001, SNK noted there are about 4 million KOF fans in South Korea. Singer Del the Funky Homosapien has recorded a song titled "The King of Fighters" whose lyrics involve the characters and special moves.

Although Kyo's story arc ends with The King of Fighters '97, he has remained a more popular hero than his successors like Ash Crimson in Western regions, which led to Ignition Entertainment promoting KOF XII using him. With KOF XIV, SNK noted the series' popularity was still dominant in South America and China, leading to the creation of teams composed of characters from those areas. In retrospect, Yasuyuki Oda said the SNK studio was revived thanks to KOFXIV, resulting in the company finally making more Samurai Shodowns, Fatal Fury and Art of Fighting games in future years. Oda wishes the company could keep doing this.

=== Gameplay ===
According to critics, The King of Fighters '94 stood out for borrowing characters from different SNK IPs while creating teams and improving on the gameplay from SNK's lesser known IPS. Electronic Gaming Monthly awarded KOF '94 "Best Fighting Game" while the two following installments were also awarded "Best Neo-Geo Game". GameSpot awarded The King of Fighters XIII as Best Fighting Game of the Year and as the Most Improved Sequel. It also received nominations for the Spike Video Game Awards,

Early games released in the 1990s were often compared with Capcom's Street Fighter series. The King of Fighters '98 is often recognized as the best entry in the series, as well as one of the greatest fighting games of all time, such as Time Extension, Hardcore Gaming 101 and Nintendo Life. While the fighting system has been well-received, critics have had mixed feelings regarding the Striker system introduced in KOF '99. In GameSpot's "The History of SNK" article, KOF '99: Evolution was described as one of the best fighting games on the Dreamcast, along with Garou: Mark of the Wolves. However, because it was released during the PlayStation 2's launch and Dreamcast's ending, the game did not sell well. With the removal of the Strikers system and the addition of the real time change of characters in fights in The King of Fighters 2003, Hardcore Gaming 101 believed the new gameplay features interesting, but the sequel, XI, fixed most of the issues present in 2003. The next two games were praised for improving the graphics highly with 1UP.com comparing them to Street Fighter III: Third Strike.

The latest game, The King of Fighter XV, was thus praised for providing more striking visuals as well as new gameplay features that made the series more accessible to newcomers. The boss characters like Rugal Bernstein, among others, has been described as one of the most challenging characters to defeat in fighting games; this feeling also led to some criticism.

=== Cast and narrative ===
IGN said that while the first game's story was fun, Kyo's subplot about finding his father dead and fighting the final boss Rugal Bernstein as the saddest event from the game. Iori's debut in the next game was popular not only for his characterization but also rivalry with Kyo. Following games were popular for exploring a narrative highly elaborated in The King of Fighters '96 where Kyo Kusanagi, his rival Iori Yagami and newcomer Chizuru Kagura join forces to defeat a threat, the demon Orochi and their servants based on Japanese mythology. The King of Fighters '97 stood out for ending the first story arc where Iori and Leona Heidern were praised for having cursed versions as boss characters. with Nintendo World Report called Kyo's final fight against the main antagonist, Orochi, an "epic and heroic battle".

Following the Orochi arc, Retronauts recalled that Kyo and Iori being removed from The King of Fighters '99 was shocking upon release which led to their eventual return as hidden due to negative feedback. 1UP.com praised the NESTS arc protagonist K' as among the most inspired new character designs in The King of Fighters series since Iori Yagami's debut in The King of Fighters '95 based on design and fighting style. MeriStation enjoyed the NESTS arc for focusing on a new set of characters related to the previous lead as Kyo Kusanagi's DNA resulted in the new ones having multiple similarities. The last Kyo experiment created by NESTS who debuts in KOF 2001, K9999, was noted to be controversial for his similarities with Tetsuo from the 1988 film Akira which led to Kotaku wonder if the company removed him from the series due to potential copyright violations. Chris Moyse from Destructoid said while some SNK fans looked down on the narrative of the NESTS arc due to the exploitation of Kyo Kusanagi clones as well as multiple Star Wars similarities, they still appreciate several of such clones with Kula being a major example of them among other test subjects such as K'.

In regards to the Ash saga, Destructoid writer Jonathan Holmes praised Ash's character as "defying traditional gender roles while kicking some ass" and called him "the perfect mascot for the KoF series as a whole." In retrospect, Excite called him a rare character not only as a protagonist like Kyo or K', but even in fighting games as a whole, with his easygoing personality and character design giving off a very strong personality. While The King of Fighters XIII prioritized storytelling on a bigger depth, Ash's arc was criticized for being confusing to follow especially to newcomers.

For the New Age arc, DashFight said that Shun'ei was an innovative protagonist in the series for having a more softspoken personality but also an arc involving a power he has yet to control, allowing him to complement other KOF protagonists as well as guests from other IPs. Excite said that while Kyo stopped being the series' protagonist, he remains a strong narrative figure, earning him the title of "honorary protagonist of the KOF series for life!" in The King of Fighters XV. Besides main cast, The King of Fighters XV appealed for bringing back the first KOF boss Rugal, as well as the Garou: Mark of the Wolves protagonist Rock Howard.
