= King of Fighters R-1 =

1998 video game

- Developer(s): SNK
- Publisher(s): SNK
- Series: The King of Fighters
- Platform(s): Neo Geo Pocket
- Release: JP/HK: October 28, 1998
- Genre(s): Beat 'em up

King of Fighters R-1 (KOF R-1) is a 1998 2D fighting video game developed and released by SNK as a launch title for the Neo Geo Pocket handheld system. It is based on The King of Fighters '97, sharing the same storyline. A sequel, King of Fighters R-2, was released the following year.

== Plot ==
The game shares the same storyline as The King of Fighters '97, taking place after the events of The King of Fighters '96.

=== Characters ===
- Savior Team
  - Kyo Kusanagi
  - Chizuru Kagura
  - Iori Yagami (Note: "Orochi" version is also unlockaable)
- New Faces Team
  - Yashiro Nanakase
  - Shermie
  - Chris
- South Town Team
  - Terry Bogard
  - Ryo Sakazaki
  - Kim Kaphwan
- Heroines Team
  - Mai Shiranui
  - Yuri Sakazaki
  - Athena Asamiya
- Single entry
  - Shingo Yabuki
  - Leona Heidern
  - Orochi
