= The Rhythm of Fighters =

2014 video game

- Logo of the game featuring Kyo Kusanagi
- Developer: SNK Playmore
- Publisher: SNK Playmore
- Platforms: Android, iOS
- Release: June 24, 2014 - July 15, 2015
- Genre: Rhythm game
- Mode: Single-player

The Rhythm of Fighters is a free-to-play music-based video game produced and developed by SNK Playmore for iOS and Android. It was released on June 24, 2014 and removed from app stores on July 15, 2015. In the game, the player controls a fighter and taps the screen to attack a rival. Depending on the character chosen, a different musical theme would be used. Additionally, the player can earn experience by defeating enemies similar to role-playing video games.

SNK conceptualized this game as a mix of different gaming genres with music being the focus. The game received average scores by video games journalists. While the music and fighting system has been praised, the use of downloadable content (DLC) was criticized for making the complete package too expensive during the time that The Rhythm of Fighters was a paid game. Nevertheless, SNK found that the title had considerable worldwide downloads, with the DLC content being well received.

== Gameplay ==
Kyo Kusanagi attacking Terry Bogard after the player uses the tap required.

The game combines elements from rhythm games, fighting games and role-playing games. The player is given a character from SNK franchises such as The King of Fighters and Fatal Fury. The player can have their fighter character attack enemies by beat tapping: tapping the handheld device's touch screen in synchronization with the music. Performing different tappings, the characters can execute normal attacks, combos, special moves or their strongest techniques. Both fighters are given health bars during combat. The winning character can level up and expand their strength. The game has a total of 14 musical tracks that can be unlocked during play; certain musical themes appear as downloadable content (DLC). Players are given different themes depending on the characters they use: while using Geese Howard the theme is "Soy Sauce to Geese", Geese's most recurring theme from Fatal Fury while Kyo Kusanagi is presented with "Tears", his theme song from The King of Fighters '99.

The initial cast is composed of Kyo, Athena Asamiya and Ryo Sakazaki. Additional characters like Iori Yagami and Terry Bogard can be purchased through downloadable content.

== Development ==
The SNK Playmore development team had a concept to create a new video game genre by combining fighting game elements and music genre themes together. While their games were known for story and gameplay, SNK noticed their fans also enjoyed the background music themes composed for their titles. Originally a paid game, SNK turned The Rhythm of Fighters into a free-to-play game to keep consistency with Metal Slug Defense, another free game, and to avoid issues with their fanbase. Multiple easter eggs were put in the game to please returning fans, such as how the music changes with in-game commands.

On February 14, 2014, SNK trademarked the title "The Rhythm of Fighters". The game was first announced by SNK Playmore in June 2014. The first form of downloadable content became available in July under the form of four new tracks based on Fatal Fury. This was followed by eight more tracks in the same month: four tracks from The King of Fighters '97 and four tracks from Metal Slug Defense. In July, SNK added new tracks from The King of Fighters '99 and Samurai Shodown II. In September 2014 the game became free-to-play. It was removed from app stores on July 15, 2015.

== Reception ==
Reception

Aggregate score
Aggregator	Score
Metacritic	69/100

Review scores
Publication	Score
Destructoid	7/10
Pocket Gamer	7/10
TouchArcade	3.5/5
Multiplayer.it	7.0/10

Shortly after its release, SNK noticed that the game was being downloaded across many world regions. The DLC for Fatal Fury Special and Metal Slug Defense theme songs were also popular. Google Play Store recorded more than 1 million downloads by July 2015. In 2014, The Guardian listed it as one of the best android games for its mixture genres. While Kotaku noted they liked seeing this KOF spin-off, people were instead looking forward to another main installment in the franchise as The King of Fighters XIII had been released years ago Rhythm.

Destructoid gave the game a 7 out of 10, praising its low initial price and the use of music, but noted that the game suffered from the "unfortunate trappings of the mobile platform". The same score was given by Pocket Gamer UK which stated that it was not only for SNK fans but suitable for general players. The reviewer expressed surprise with the gameplay system's entertaining modes but felt that it was not unique. Touch Arcade noted that "It's not the most high-effort product, and the initial buy-in only gets you about half the content, but I still had a really good time with The Rhythm of Fighters" and gave it a 3.5 out of 5. The reviewer felt there were some lag issues during his playthrough on his iPhone 5S which might make other ports superior in comparison. Critics in general found the price for the entire game too expensive based on the use of DLC. 148apps was harsher in the terms of music employed during most of the game, finding it unfitting. Nevertheless, the reviewer praised the fighting system based on how the player's actions create a fight similar to games developed from the franchise. In contrast to most other reviews, Hyper felt that the DLC was reasonably priced. Multiplayer.it called the game simple and fun but criticized the music selection.
