= King of Fighters R-2 =

1999 fighting video game

- European cover art
- Developer: SNK
- Publisher: SNK
- Series: The King of Fighters
- Platforms: Neo-Geo Pocket Color, Nintendo Switch
- Release: JP: March 19, 1999; NA: April 30, 1999; EU: October 1, 1999; Nintendo Switch: WW: August 7, 2020
- Genre: Fighting
- Modes: Single-player, multiplayer

King of Fighters R-2 (KOF R-2) is a 1999 fighting video game released by SNK for the Neo Geo Pocket Color handheld system. It is the sequel to King of Fighters R-1 and is part of The King of Fighters series. Like most other games in the series, King of Fighters R-2 features various SNK characters; this game, which features the same story as The King of Fighters '98, has the main character going up against Rugal Bernstein, who is creating clones of the main characters.

A port for Nintendo Switch was released on August 7, 2020, which was additionally included as part of Neo Geo Pocket Color Selection Vol. 1 in 2021.

== Gameplay ==
King of Fighters R-2 brings back most of King of Fighters R-1's gameplay, bringing back Singleplay and Teamplay, and the VS mode using a link cable. The Making mode is a new mode which lets the player customize their fighter and send them on a quest to defeat Rugal Bernstein. Also the player can connect with the Dreamcast game King of Fighters '99 Dream Match. It has all the starting characters from King of Fighters R-1 except Chizuru Kagura and Kim Kaphwan, replacing them with Saisyu Kusanagi and Kasumi Todoh.

=== Characters ===
- Kusanagi Team
  - Kyo Kusanagi (Note: Alternate version is also unlockable)
    Saisyu Kusanagi
    Shingo Yabuki
- Super Babe Team
  - Athena Asamiya
    Yuri Sakazaki
    Kasumi Todoh
- New South Town Team
  - Terry Bogard
    Ryo Sakazaki
    Mai Shiranui
- Orochi Team
  - Yashiro Nanakase
    Shermie
    Chris
- Single entry
  - Leona Heidern
    Iori Yagami
    Omega Rugal

== Reception ==
Reception

Aggregate score
Aggregator	Score
Metacritic	(NS) 71/100

Review scores
Publication	Score
AllGame	(NGPC) 4/5
GameSpot	(NGPC) 8.2/10
IGN	(NGPC) 9.0/10
Nintendo Life	(NS) 8/10
Nintendo World Report	(NS) 7.5/10
Video Games (DE)	(NGPC) 3/5
Pocket Gamer	(NGPC) A−
Pockett Videogames	(NGPC) 5/5

King of Fighters R-2 on Nintendo Switch received "mixed or average reviews" according to review aggregator Metacritic.

In 2023, Time Extension identified King of Fighters R-2 as one of the best games for the NGPC.
