= Yuri Sakazaki =

Fictional character

- Art of Fighting and The King of Fighters character
- Yuri Sakazaki by Eisuke Ogura
- First game: Art of Fighting (1992)
- Voiced by: English: Veronica Taylor (Art of Fighting anime); Maddie Matsumoto (FF:COTW); Japanese: Harumi Ikoma (AOF); Kaori Horie (AOF2–KOF XIII); Ai Kakuma (KOF XIV onwards); Ayumi Hamasaki (Art of Fighting anime); Sakura Tange (drama CD)

In-universe information
- Fighting style: Kyokugen Karate + personal arrangements
- Origin: Japan
- Nationality: Japanese-American

Yuri Sakazaki (Japanese: ユリ・サカザキ) is a character from SNK's Art of Fighting fighting game series. She first appears in the original Art of Fighting being kidnapped by Mr. Big, a criminal from the city of South Town. The players, Yuri's brother Ryo and his friend Robert Garcia, spend the game searching for her. In the sequel, Art of Fighting 2, Yuri makes her playable debut, having been trained by her father Takuma in the art of Kyokugenryu Karate (Japanese: 極限流空手). Yuri has also starred in the animated adaptation of Art of Fighting, in which she reprises her role from the first game. She debuted not only in Art of Fighting 2 but also in SNK's sibling IP The King of Fighters, fighting as a recurring member of the Art of Fighting Team and Women Fighter Team. She was also featured in the SNK vs. Capcom crossover series as well as in SNK Gals' Fighters. Several actresses have lent their voices to Yuri since her debut.

Yuri was initially designed as a weak character who would become one of SNK's first female fighters following a positive response from Mai Shiranui in their related IP Fatal Fury. To overcome her weakness, SNK designers decided to make her mimic other fighters' moves, most notably the ones from Capcom's Street Fighter, which is often parodied by its fighter Dan Hibiki. Critics have generally praised her transition from being a damsel in distress to becoming a fighter in the Art of Fighting series. Her inclusion in The King of Fighters series was noted to give her more variety in her movesets, which would appeal to gamers as well as provide a positive portrayal of fantasy karate and female inclusion in gaming.

== Creation ==
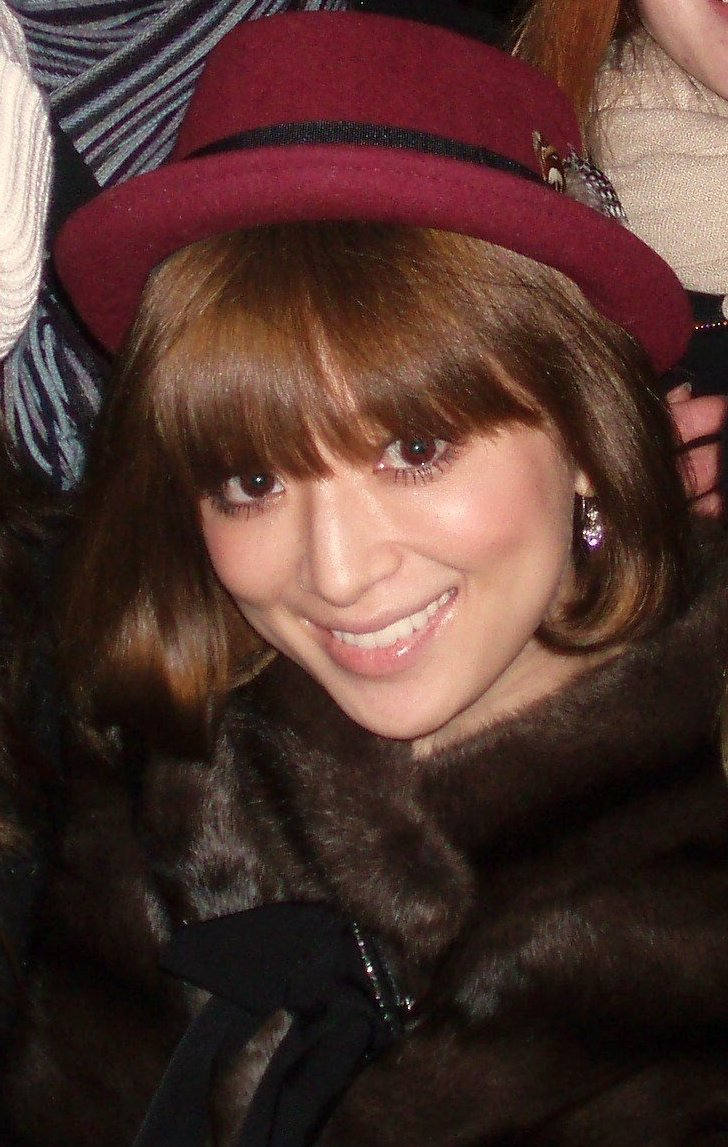
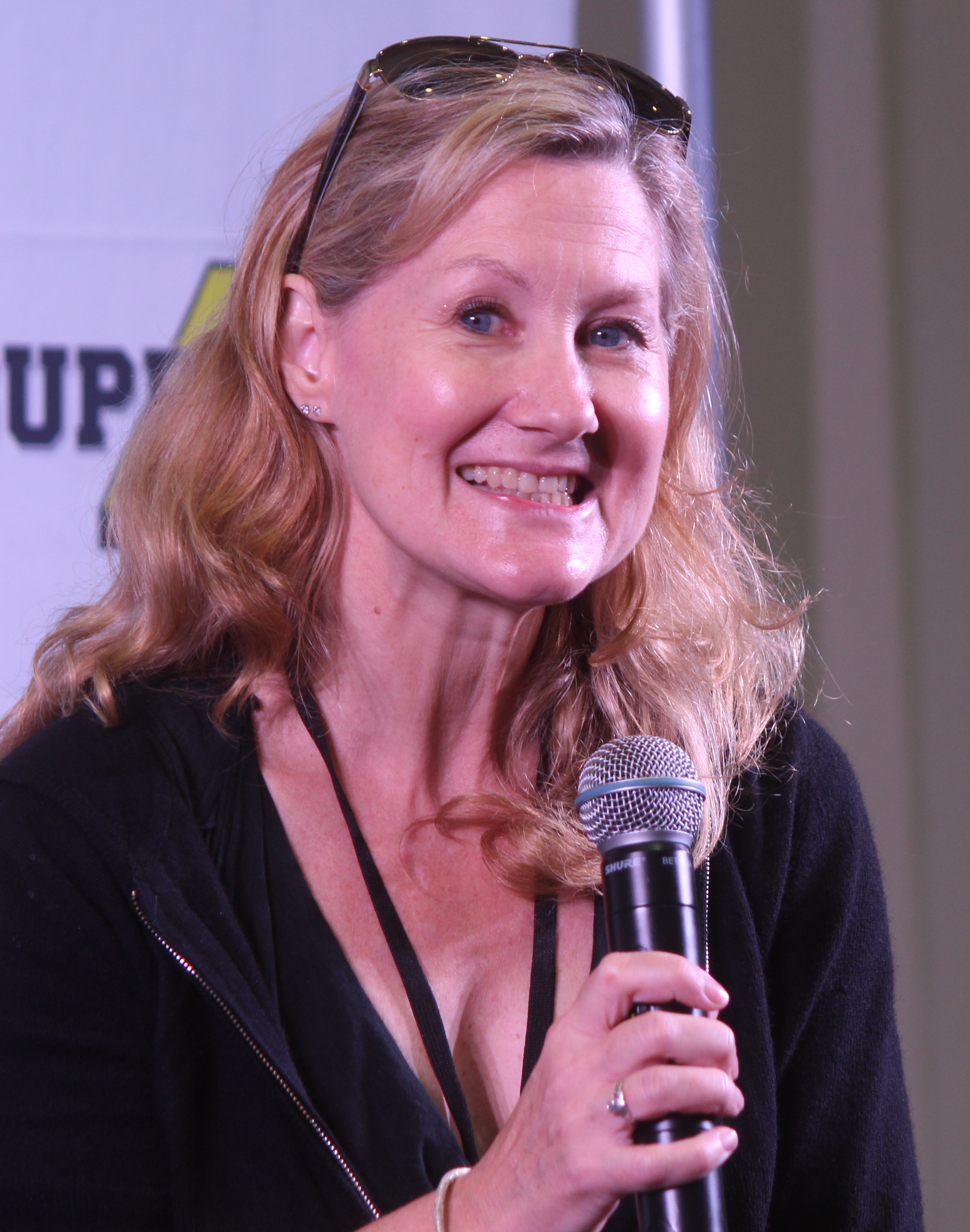
Ayumi Hamasaki (left) has voiced and portrayed Yuri in Japanese and Veronica Taylor dubbed her.

Yuri was created by SNK to be a young woman spoiled by her older brother Ryo Sakazaki, who has to rescue her in the first Art of Fighting video game. Although she was given a tragic past due to her mother's death and her father's disappearance, SNK gave her an upbeat personality. For the character voices, they used all pro or semi-pro voice actors. Yuri and fellow character King were done by the same person: Harumi Ikoma. Kaori Horie provided her voice from Art of Fighting 2 to The King of Fighters XIII. Her voice actress was replaced with Ai Kakuma since The King of Fighters XIV. Outside gaming, Ayumi Hamasaki voiced Yuri in the TV anime special and portrayed her in an Art of Fighting commercial. Veronica Taylor dubbed Yuri in the English dub. SNK developer Yasuyuki Oda reflected that both Art of Fighting and the other IP, Fatal Fury, seemed to appeal to fans of male-oriented series like Fist of the North Star and Dragon Ball. The inclusion of several macho fighters led to the dilemma of including more female characters, with Mai Shiranui standing out as SNK's first female fighter. With Mai's high popularity in Fatal Fury, SNK decided to include Yuri in Art of Fighting 2 as a playable character, which received a similar response. Yuri's popularity led to the creation of unique characters related to her, but none of them made it to the actual game until her ending sequence. Horie Kaori was inspired by Tsuyoshi Koda when developing her tomboyish personality.

The Art of Fighting staff wanted Yuri to appear in The King of Fighters; thus, she was added to the Women Fighters Team. During the development of The King of Fighters '94, there were no female fighter teams, and King, Billy Kane, and Big Bear were planned to appear as the "British team", but due to the development staff's request to include Yuri, she was replaced with Big Bear, who required a lot of space, and Mai was added to form the female fighter team. By 1997, when The King of Fighters was at its peak with the Orochi story arc, new works in the Art of Fighting series had already stopped being released. The latter tends to be unable to get involved in the main story and end up in comic roles. For this reason, Ureshino thinks many fans do not want to accept Ryo and the others in KOF.

=== Design ===
Yuri's redesign as a fighter appealed to the staff members of SNK, especially liking the universal lower body due to her combination of a white gi and blue pants. Her brown hair tends to change depending on the respective game. Once it was announced Yuri would be a playable character in Art of Fighting 2, the staff behind The King of Fighters '94 wanted her to be part of the cast. Yuri's designer said the character had some bosom animation but not as much as Mai; she spent much work on Yuri's calves. While in The King of Fighters XIII, Yuri was given short hair; the SNK staff decided to give her back her braids for The King of Fighters XV in order to make her look more beautiful and give the game a more nostalgic view while still retaining a tomboyish style. If Yuri is defeated with a special attack, part of her white gi is damaged.

KOF: Maximum Impact marks the first time since Art of Fighting 2 that she has received a new outfit that is composed of a green camo print shirt, short pants, dark green gloves, and green shoes. In KOF: Maximum Impact 2, some of her extra normal outfits make her look like fellow Kyokugen practitioners; color scheme B makes her look like Ryo (blond hair, orange gi, and black tights), while scheme F resembles Robert Garcia's outfit from The King of Fighters '99 to 2002, which consists of brown hair, an orange gi with black long-sleeved tights, and no headband. In the KOF spin-off SNK Heroines: Tag Team Frenzy, Yuri sports a traditional Japanese festival outfit as well as a sporty pink jacket costume besides her regular uniform.

=== Gameplay ===
Yuri was created for experts to play due to lacking throws and special moves involving charges. As a result, the developers recommended players try different strategies when using her in Art of Fighting 2. She employs variations of her family's Kyokugen Karate. According to a staff member, Yuri in the KOF series learns techniques that are reminiscent of someone's technique with each new title. This was done by director Toyohisa Tanabe, as he believed Capcom was ahead of their company when creating Ryo's parody character Dan Hibiki in Street Fighter Alpha. Ever since her introduction to the Art of Fighting, Yuri was a weak character who became a fighter in a year, using her family's Kyokugen Karate style. Tanabe decided to make Yuri a strong character despite her background and often borrowed techniques from Capcom fighting games out of respect in a fast fashion.

The King of Fighters writer Akihiko Ureshino describes Yuri as "the greatest genius", probably because, although she was originally a girl who was good at sports, it only took her one year to master the secret techniques of her father after she started to train in karate seriously. When discussing genius in the sense of being able to quickly grasp something, then Yuri may indeed be the best. While Yuri's adult life was portrayed in SNK games besides small mentions in the Fatal Fury series, Ureshino believes Yuri might become a mother on such a timeline, and her child would either succeed Ryo's dojo once her brother has retired. In making Yuri for The King of Fighters XIII, director Kei Yamamoto stated Yuri wanted the character's moves to focus on kicks, something which clashed with Robert Garcia's style, who also used the same fighting style. Due to the skill required to perform some of her special attacks, Yamamoto feels Yuri's players should train themselves in order to use her properly.

== Appearances ==
=== Video games ===
Although Yuri is not playable in the first Art of Fighting game, she plays a big role in the plot as she is kidnapped by the Southtown criminal Mr. Big, causing Ryo Sakazaki and Robert Garcia to search for her throughout the game. In the end, Mr. Big leads the duo to a masked man who is guarding Yuri. Yuri stops the fight, revealing the masked man is their missing father, Takuma. In Art of Fighting 2, Yuri becomes a playable character, being trained by Takuma after the events from the previous game. Yuri enters the King of Fighters tournament along with Ryo, Robert, and Takuma. In Art of Fighting 3, Yuri is once again unplayable, but she appears along with Ryo searching for Robert, who was helping a childhood friend known as Freya Lawrence. Yuri also starts to be attracted to Robert, something noted by Ryo to the point of telling her to accompany him on a journey at the ending. The game's forthcoming update, Art of Fighting 3 R, will feature Yuri as a playable character. Although Yuri is not playable in Art of Fighting's sequel series, Fatal Fury, an older version of her appears as a non playable character in Fatal Fury: City of the Wolves, set over 25 years after the events of Art of Fighting 3. In the game, she and Robert have established the Yuri Fitness Club, where Ryo's student Marco Rodrigues goes to train after his dojo is attacked by Vox Reaper.

Yuri is also a playable character in The King of Fighters series, first as part of the Women Fighters Team along with Mai Shiranui and King, participating in the annual King of Fighters tournaments, often switching with her family's Art of Fighting Team. Her latest appearance is in The King of Fighters XV alongside Athena and Mai as part of the new "Team Super Heroine". Yuri appears in multiple spin-off games, including The King of Fighters Neowave and The King of Fighters: Kyo, as a potential recruit for lead character Kyo Kusanagi and a friend. She appears as an assistant character in The King of Fighters EX for the Art of Fighting Team and as a playable character in The King of Fighters EX2. She is also featured in the spin-offs KOF: Maximum Impact and Maximum Impact 2, participating in new tournaments from Southtown. The spin-offs King of Fighters R-1 and King of Fighters R-2 feature Yuri as part of the Super Babe Team alongside Athena and Kasumi Todoh.

Additionally, she stars in most games from the SNK vs. Capcom series except SNK vs. Capcom: SVC Chaos (where she makes a cameo appearance in Ryo's and Mr. Karate's endings). In the crossover SNK Gals' Fighters, Yuri appears as a playable character with her wanting to start her own gym, while she also appears in SNK Heroines: Tag Team Frenzy. She is furthermore present in cellphone games such as KOF Gals Mahjong, The King of Fighters '98 Ultimate Match Online, The King of Fighters All Star, and Kimi wa Hero. Her character design serves as downloadable content in Dead or Alive 5 Last Round, as well as Lucent Heart.

=== Other media ===
Yuri appears in various SNK manga and in the Art of Fighting anime adaptation, which retells the story from the first game but with Mr. Big wanting to obtain a diamond that Ryo and Robert found. She is voiced by Ayumi Hamasaki in the Japanese version and by Veronica Taylor in the English dub. In Shinkiro's manga, Yuri's backstory is told as it is revealed Ryo was raised following Takuma's disappearance. She is briefly mentioned in Buriki One by a middle-aged Ryo. For The King of Fighters Destiny, Yuri has a disagreement with her family over the idea of competition, resulting in the formation of the Women Fighters Team. Additionally, a oneshot retells the first game but with Ryo saving Yuri from King. She is also featured in The King of Fighters: A New Beginning, facing Meitenkun. An alternate Yuri also appears in the isekai light novel The King of Fantasy, siding with fellow character Iori Yagami, who finds himself lost in this world where Yuri lives. An action figure of her character was released by SNK Playmore.

== Critical reception ==
Yuri was popular for her gender representation across gaming; Tiago Frosi (2010) and Felipe Frosi (2010) from Universidade Federal do Ceará claim that she was a replica of the idealized stereotype for women, a young woman dressed in pink, fragile, and in need of rescue by strong and courageous men, an early model that went against women's independence in this period. In later versions, Yuri presents herself as a karate practitioner. In the game's story, she is trained by her father and goes against all of her brother's sexist ideas, serving as an example of a woman's transformation within the game. The character also became an icon among Japan's female audience. In the magazine Paletta, she was highlighted as an imprisoned heroine who became a talented fighter in the world in a single year. The writer was impressed by the change in the character's personality following Art of Fighting 2, as she acts more energetically and has a more notable sex appeal. Just like in Art of Fighting 2, Yuri was also a surprising character in The King of Fighters '94 for being one of the most memorable and surprising fighting game figures. Tiago O. Frosi from Universidade Federal do Rio Grande do Sul regarded Yuri as one of the most impactful female characters in fighting game history due to how she initially debuts as a damsel in distress only to become a playable character both in the sequel and SNK's crossover video games. According to Excite, in Art of Fighting 2 people were also looking forward to doing damage clothing to both King and Yuri. When hearing that Yuri and King would be appearing in The King of Fighters 94, a fighting game featuring popular characters from various games, these two characters once again were interesting to male gamers. While these option was removed in later installments, The King of Fighters XIII brought back damaged clothing, which made the younger fans express mixed feelings since they were now adults and, thus dismayed by the handling of the character.

Game Software Magazine said that while Yuri and Ryo are always arguing until they decided to join The King of Fighters tournaments together. The character's debut in Art of Fighting 2 was also regarded as a major surprise thanks to how Takuma trained her between the after the first game. Nevertheless, she still comes across as a rebellious girl for wearing sneakers among other uncommon items for a karate user unlike her brother Ryo who is seen as a more traditional fighter.

When it comes to video game critics, Eurogamer regarded Yuri as one of the most charming characters created by SNK since Art of Fighting 2 and how KOF integrated her into its series. DieHardGameFan referred to her as "wonderful adorable obnoxious completely batshit ludicrous Yuri" due to how hilarious she is, making her his favorite SNK fighter as well as superior to the Dead or Alive characters he also enjoys. As a result, he enjoyed Yuri's debut in Art of Fighting 2 as a playable character due to her hilarious interactions. Gavin Jasper of Den of Geek also praised her departure from a damsel in distress to a full character as the games progressed. Den of Geek also noted that the Art of Fighting Team in general has been characterized as more comical characters in The King of Fighters than in Art of Fighting, though in The King of Fighters XI, they accidentally created their own rival, which further expands the humor. Hardcore Gaming 101 criticized her portrayal in the Art of Fighting OVA for being unrecognizable. In an Art of Fighting commercial, Yuri was portrayed by her own voice actress, Ayumi Hamasaki, whom Itmedia praised for keeping in-character during the entire video. Manga artist Nobuhiro Watsuki designed the character of Makimachi Misao for the Rurouni Kenshin manga series with similarities to Mai Shiranui and Yuri, comically saying he was "making his own grave" due to the similarities with the SNK characters. A KOF maid cafe was done in 2017 in Osaka, where not only were there drinks inspired by Yuri's character, but maids also appeared wearing Yuri's outfit.

The character has also been linked to Street Fighter characters as a result of similar fighting techniques. In retrospect, Tiago Oviedo Frosi wrote that Gichin Funakoshi's "Shotokan" is the most practiced style of karate in the world; this was the style chosen to characterize most of the Street Fighter characters. The Kyokugenryu the cast uses in Art of Fighting instead comes across as a fantasy version of the "knockout" Kyokushinkaikan created by Mas Oyama, who serves as an influence for both Ryu's and Takuma's characters. However, most of Yuri's variations of the Kyokugen style are deemed comic gags, which she copies. GamingBolt also regarded her as one of the most popular characters in early KOF, especially when she mimics moves from Street Fighter characters. She was compared with the Street Fighter character Sakura Kasugano by writer Tiago O. Frosi from Federal University of Rio Grande do Sul for having similar archetypes as well as an imitated fighting style from veteran fighters.
