= Robo Army =

1991 video game

- Developer: SNK
- Publisher: SNK
- Producer: Eikichi Kawasaki
- Designers: Akira Goto; Koichi Sakita; Takeshi Kimura
- Composers: Kazuhiro Nishida; Yasumasa Yamada
- Platforms: Arcade, Neo Geo AES, Neo Geo CD
- Release: Arcade: WW: October 30, 1991; Neo Geo AES: WW: December 20, 1991; Neo Geo CD: JP: April 21, 1995; NA: October 1996
- Genre: Beat 'em up
- Modes: Single-player, multiplayer
- Arcade system: Neo Geo MVS

Robo Army (Note: Japanese: ロボ・アーミー, Hepburn: Robo Āmī) is a 1991 beat 'em up video game developed and published by SNK for Neo Geo arcade and home platforms. It was released for the Neo Geo CD in 1995. Hamster Corporation re-released the game as part of their ACA Neo Geo series for the PlayStation 4, Xbox One, Nintendo Switch, Windows, Android and iOS.

== Gameplay ==
Gameplay screenshot

There is no character selection in Robo Army: Player 1 controls Maxima and Player 2 controls Rocky. Both cyborgs must cross six levels before reaching the end boss. During these levels, they will face the Professor's henchmen, as well as a sub-boss and a boss in each stage. The two heroes can of course fight with their fists and feet, but they can also defend themselves by collecting improvised weapons (car carcass, barrel, destroyed robot arm). They each have a power gauge allowing them to launch powerful attacks according to the power gained. Maxima and Rocky can also be transformed for a brief moment into an invulnerable armored vehicle.

== Reception ==
Reception

Aggregate score
Aggregator	Score
GameRankings	(Switch) 70%

Review scores
Publication	Score
AllGame	(Neo Geo)
Computer and Video Games	(Neo Geo) 84 / 100
Famitsu	(Neo Geo) 23 / 40
GamePro	(Neo Geo) 20 / 25
Nintendo Life	(Switch) 7 / 10
Consoles +	(Neo Geo) 93%
Génération 4	(Neo Geo) 90%
Joypad	(Neo Geo) 75%
Joystick	(Neo Geo) 90%
Megablast	(Neo Geo) 74%
Mega Fun	(Neo Geo) 80%
Micom BASIC Magazine	(Neo Geo)
Player One	(Neo Geo) 90%
Última Generación	(Neo Geo CD) 70 / 100

In Japan, Game Machine listed Robo Army on their December 15, 1991 issue as being the twenty-third most-successful table arcade unit of the month, outperforming titles such as Columns. The game received mixed reception from both critics and reviewers alike since its initial release in arcades and Neo Geo AES.

In 2014, HobbyConsolas identified Robo Army as one of the twenty best games for the Neo Geo CD.
