= Shinkiro =

Japanese illustrator and conceptual artist

Toshiaki Mori (森 気楼, Mori Toshiaki; born December 14, 1962), best known under the pen name of Shinkiro (森気楼, Shinkirō), is a Japanese illustrator and conceptual artist who used to work for SNK and is currently employed by Capcom.

Prior to joining Capcom, Shinkiro was employed by SNK, where he provided the character designs and cover illustrations for many of their Neo Geo games, including such series as Fatal Fury, Metal Slug, The King of Fighters, and Samurai Shodown, as well as for the crossover series SNK vs Capcom on which he collaborated with Capcom's Kinu Nishimura. During the 1990s, he was the most recognizable and famous of their artists. After that, he worked as a free illustrator and a cartoonist.

At Capcom since 2000, Shinkiro has done several cover artworks and character designs for many of their games, including Bionic Commando Rearmed, Dino Stalker, Dead Rising, Capcom Fighting Jam, Resident Evil: Dead Aim, Tatsunoko vs. Capcom, Marvel vs. Capcom 3, Ultimate Marvel vs. Capcom 3, and Capcom vs SNK series. He has also done the packaging illustrations for Game Boy Advance versions of Final Fight and Super Ghouls'n Ghosts, as well as the Japanese release of Psi-Ops: The Mindgate Conspiracy. His other job is helping with hand drawn-artwork for the rendering work on games such as Monster Hunter Cross and the HD remake of Resident Evil 0.

He also drew cover arts for manga books and for American comics such as Spider-Man Unlimited and Udon's Street Fighter and Darkstalkers comic series. His classic work for SNK was included again in The King of Fighters XIV.
