= Shun'ei (The King of Fighters) =

Fictional video game character

- The King of Fighters character
- Shun'ei in The King of Fighters XIV by Eisuke Ogura
- First game: The King of Fighters XIV (2016)
- Voiced by: Takashi Ōhara

In-universe information
- Fighting style: Hakkyougen'eiken

Shun'ei (Japanese: 瞬影 シュンエイ) is a fictional character from SNK's fighting game series, The King of Fighters. Although he does not play a major role in The King of Fighters XIV, he is the protagonist of The King of Fighters XV (which further explores his character, origins and powers). Shun'ei was introduced in 2016's The King of Fighters XIV as a member of the China Team, trained by Tung Fu Rue. He is put into the title-world competition to develop his supernatural powers, combining them with the Hakkyougen'eiken (八極聖, lit. "Eight Extremes Holy Fist"). In addition to the games, Shun'ei also appears in the manga adaptation of The King of Fighters XIV: The King of Fighters: A New Beginning. He is voiced by Takashi Ōhara.

Unlike other The King of Fighters protagonists, Shun'ei was created to appeal to a female audience; the Fatal Fury designers behind Rock Howard used the same concept to design both characters. Uncertain about his appeal, Shun'ei did not become the new protagonist until The King of Fighters XV writer Akihiko Ureshino favorably compared him with The King of Fighters veteran Kyo Kusanagi; both had matured across the narrative. Critical response to Shun'ei's character has been positive, based on his contrast with other The King of Fighters protagonists; inexperienced, he is already at his strongest but must control his powers.

== Appearances ==
First appearing in The King of Fighters XIV, Shun'ei wields hydrokinesis in the form of a claw on the right side of his body and pyrokinesis in the form of a fist on the left side of his body. He is trained by Tung Fu Rue, the legendary master of Hakkyokuseiken. During the tournament finals, Shun'ei learns that he possesses a fragment of Verse's power; this causes Verse to go after him. After Verse's defeat the team returns to the Wudang Mountains, where Shun'ei tells his teammates that the champion Kyo Kusanagi advised him to continue training to keep his powers under control and vows to train harder.

Shun'ei's special abilities originated as a result of Ash Crimson's erasure of his ancestor, Saiki, from existence by orchestrating a temporal paradox (trapping Saiki in the present time). This leads to the events in the King of Fighters universe, with Shun'ei wielding a power known as Amplified Specters: the crucible of souls which connects all universes and converges all possibilities in the multiverse. After Shun'ei inherits two halves of the Amplified Specters from Verse, he experiences recurring nightmares of being ordered to destroy everything in sight until Tung gives him a pair of headphones to help silence the voice in his head and keep his powers in check. When Tung retires from fighting, Shun'ei and Meitenkun are enlisted to be accompanied by Benimaru Nikaido (at Kyo's behest) because Kyo has an important mission with Iori Yagami and Chizuru Kagura to help investigate during the events of King of Fighters XV. Once the source of the Amplified Specters, Otoma=Raga has been defeated; Shun'ei's power is under control, allowing him to take off his headphones safely.

The manga adaptation The King of Fighters: A New Beginning has Shun'ei joining the XIV tournament to face Kyo, whom he considers the strongest man on the planet and against whom he wants to test himself. While facing Ryo Sakazaki of the Art of Fighting team, Shun'ei demonstrates his full power but cannot defeat his opponent. In the aftermath, South Town criminal Geese Howard absorbs Verse and faces the Fatal Fury team. With the help of his master, Shun'ei defeats the powered-up Geese and the tournament is stopped.

== Conception and design ==
Although Eisuke Ogura designed the main cast of most of The King of Fighters since The King of Fighters XII, Shun'ei was created by another artist because director Yasuyuki Oda wanted to distance him from previous leads. Nobuyuki Kuroki said that Shun'ei is not the main character, but plays a major role in the story. Previous KOF heroes Kyo Kusanagi, K' and Ash Crimson have been more independent protagonists, but Shun'ei is slightly younger and more mentally unstable. Oda has compared Shun'ei to Rock Howard of Fatal Fury, and said that his story could be as much fun to write as Rock's. Oda felt that unlike the older fighting-game protagonists, Shun'ei has a unique worldview and his values change as he grows older. Comparing The King of Fighters protagonists, writer Akihiko Ureshino said that Shun'ei is closer to Kyo in characterization; although Kyo began as an aggressive teenager, his role in the series created a character arc which made him more mature and similar to Shun'ei. Unlike Shun'ei and Kyo, Ureshino sees Ash, K' and Iori as less developed. He was voiced by Takashi Ōhara.

Shun'ei's original design was common in Chinese people, but the staff decided on a more stylish design. Kuroki said that his design was meant to appeal to a female audience, similar to Rock Howard's concept; both characters share similar creators. According to Oda, Shun'ei feels closer to a Fatal Fury character than a The King of Fighters character. Ogura said that the staff were originally not confident about using Shun'ei as the sole protagonist in The King of Fighters XIV, which is why he did not have a major role until The King of Fighters XV. Nevertheless, SNK produced as downloadable content a more typical outfit for the character to wear. Thus, the character design of Shun'ei was modified to be more stylish and new moves were added for the game.

SNK created Isla as a rival to Shun'ei in his second appearance, giving the design team free rein. The resulting draft impacted Oda as very close to the final result, but he was initially concerned about putting a character with that type of design into a fighting game. Despite Shun'ei as the protagonist, the story explores Isla's character as well. Ogura wanted to use Terry Bogard as part of Shun'ei's Hero Team because he is a disciple of Tung like newcomers Meitenkun and Shun'ei, thinking that he would be in the best position to watch over them. They finally chose Benimaru Nikaido as a proposal from fellow busy character Kyo; Benimaru is just good enough to take care of others, and Kyo was asked by fellow fighter Chizuru Kagura to join her team. Ogura was ultimately glad about this decision. Although the game completed Shun'ei's character arc, SNK is dissatisfied with the result and believes that they could again focus on his role.

== Critical reception ==
In anticipation of The King of Fighters XIV, Steven Hill of PushSquare said that Shun'ei and Nelson were the two biggest highlights. In the case of , Hill found Shun'ei's moves appealing, allowing multiple combos on the ground and in the air. An Electronic Gaming Monthly writer said that Shun'ei and Meitenkun have the potential to become appealing characters because their teacher is Tung Fu Rue, also responsible for training two popular SNK characters: Terry Bogard and Andy Bogard, introduced in the Fatal Fury series.

Den of Geek's Gavin Jasper said that Shun'ei's arc began with The King of Fighters XIV, and he already liked the character; SNK made him one of the first playable ones in early demos. Jasper felt that Shun'ei stands out because his history differs from stereotypical heroes; in his debut Shun'ei, reaches the peak of his strength and must control his power and protect himself instead of developing it in future games. Jasper looked forward to Shun'ei's role in future installments of the series.

Matt Leone of Polygon said that although The King of Fighters began as a competition between SNK products, the series continuously developed its own protagonists; Shun'ei replaced Ash Crimson in the New Age arc with his own skills. He was compared to the Street Fighter 6 character Luke; both are successors to iconic characters, and must prove their worth. Polygon said that The King of Fighters XV feels like an SNK museum for heroes, from Kyo to Shun'ei.

According to Famitsu, Shun'ei was meant to be the new hero of The King of Fighters (succeeding Ash Crimson) but SNK decided to promote The King of Fighters XIV with Kyo and Iori Yagami on the game's front cover and in other promotional material. In the main visual of The King of Fighters XIV Ultimate Edition (which includes all DLC characters and costumes) however, Shun'ei was depicted as a main character; this hinted at his role in the next game, The King of Fighters XV. In 2025, Turtle Beach Corporation produced a series of gaming controllers with Shun'ei's picture among other KOF characters.

Shun'ei was also criticized by the media. About his role in The King of Fighters XV, Destructoid called him and Isla replacements for Kyo and Iori's roles in the Orochi arc of the first games (where the rivals joined forces to defeat a great evil). ComicBook.com writer Matthew Danielson said that Shun'ei had an overly-detailed outfit, which audiences disliked. Isla's debut in The King of Fighters XV as his rival made Shun'ei feel more inferior; Danielson said that Isla had a more appealing design and more creative techniques which appeal to newcomers. A Fighters Generation said that Shun'ei came across as a K-pop character because of his design, which he found overly detailed compared with previous King of Fighters protagonists. Comparing him to a character from Xuan Dou Zhi Wang based on his design, he felt that American players would not enjoy the character. Shun'ei's gameplay is more visually outstanding because of his multiple techniques, but the writer did not find him appealing enough to eclipse previous SNK protagonists.

In a retrospective article about The King of Fighters, Esteban Sky Cuevas of GameRant said that The King of Fighters XIV ended with the victory of the Japanese team led by Kyo Kusanagi, but Shun'ei was an appealing character because he defeated Verse and befriended his predecessor in the aftermath. With the game ending in a cliffhanger, Sky Cuevas noted that Shun'ei could encounter Verse again on The King of Fighters XV's new Hero Team and newcomer Isla shares his powers. TheGamer recommended Shun'ei to offensive players; his special moves are easy to cancel, resulting in the creation of strong combos.

Elizbar Ramazassvili of DashFight said that Shun'ei was an innovative protagonist in the series; soft-spoken, his arc involves a power he has yet to control. This allows him to complement other KOF protagonists and guests from other games who are more aggressive and experienced. Ramazassvili found the character's mix of traditional martial arts and supernatural Dragon's Fist abilities appealing because of the game's visuals, a major part of the narrative. Shun'ei's design, mixing red and black colors and adding dragon-themed moves, made him more popular in The King of Fighters XV.
