= The King of Fighters: A New Beginning =

Japanese manga series

- First tankōbon volume cover
- Genre: Martial arts
- Manga
- Written by: Kyōtarō Azuma
- Published by: Kodansha
- English publisher: NA: Seven Seas Entertainment
- Imprint: Sirius KC
- Magazine: Magazine Pocket
- Original run: January 1, 2018 – August 10, 2020
- Volumes: 6
- icon

The King of Fighters: A New Beginning is a Japanese manga series authored by Kyōtarō Azuma. It was serialized on Kodansha's digital platform Magazine Pocket from January 2018 to August 2020, with its chapters collected in six tankōbon volumes. It is an adaptation of SNK's 2016 fighting game The King of Fighters XIV. In North America, the manga was licensed by Seven Seas Entertainment, with its six volumes released from March 2020 to August 2021.

The series follows an ensemble of fighters drawn into a global tournament organized by a mysterious figure named Antonov. Among them is the veteran martial artist Tung Fu Rue, who mentors his students through the competition's escalating battles. As Azuma handled both writing and artwork, SNK staff collaborated closely to ensure the manga remained faithful to the game's canon.

Critical reception to the series has been mixed, with early chapters criticized for prioritizing fight scenes over narrative development. However, critics consistently praised the faithful character designs and dynamic fight choreography, particularly in their treatment of fan-favorite characters from the game's roster.

== Plot ==
Years after the last fighting tournament, "The King of Fighters", a fighter Antonov opens his own competition. The elder martial artist Tung Fu Rue brings his students, Shun'ei and Meitenkun's, to enter the competition and test their new powers. In the first team battle, Japan Team composed of Kyo Kusanagi, Benimaru Nikaido and Goro Daimon faces the Yagami Team composed of Iori Yagami, Vice and Mature. As Benimaru and Daimon win their respective fights, Iori gets turned into a berserker by the demon Orochi brought by unknown, resulting in a double knock out of both Iori and Kyo.

In the next match, Shun'ei faces off Art of Fighting Team's Ryo Sakazaki, but is defeated due to losing control of his powers. However, Tung and Meitenkun defeat Ryo's teammates Robert Garcia and Yuri Sakazaki. In the third match a trio of mercenaries, The Ikari Team, face the team of Mexican wrestlers. Angel, formerly a terrorist working for NESTS, loses her match against Leona Heidern, almost getting mind controlled by the power of Orochi, similar to Iori. As Ralf Jones and Clark Still win their battles against Team Mexico, Athena Asamiya and Sie Kensou aid the investigation into Angel's recent change. The tournament progresses with the K' Team, composed of the former NESTS experiments K', Kula Diamond and Maxima, face against the Team South America, composed of Nelson, Zarina, Bandeiras Hattori. NESTS's influence cause Nelson and Kula to go out of control and nearly kill K'. Meanwhile, Kyo helps Athena and Sie find an army of Kyo's replicas created by the former NESTS leader, Igniz, who aims to control one of them as his new body. Enraged, Kyo decapitates Igniz and destroys all of his replicas. Igniz tries to escape but gets incinerated by K', freeing the NESTS experiments.

With NESTS defeated, the tournament is interrupted by a supernatural creature, responsible for the Orochi's summon who starts to yell Verse. A criminal fighter Geese Howard battles Verse and absorbs its power, resulting into a fight against Fatal Fury Team and Team China. As this happens, the wraiths of previously deceased beings who supported Orochi and NESTS are risen by Verse's power, and face Kyo and other teams from the tournament. Once Shun'ei defeats Geese and dislocates him from his Verse-powered Nightmare form, the wraiths disappear. However, the Ikari Team learn after Verse's was defeated, its power produced the revival of more people, including the wraiths they fought and the missing Ash Crimson.

== Publication ==
The series, authored by Kyōtarō Azuma, was first announced in November 2017 by Kodansha for free serialization on its online platform Magazine Pocket. Azuma's work was reviewed by Akihiko Ureshino, the writer behind most The King of Fighters novelizations. The King of Fighters XIV director Yasuyuki Oda noted that while the story could fit within the franchise's canon, it might significantly influence future works, as A New Beginning aimed to stay true to the game's narrative. While the original The King of Fighters XIV included additional characters as downloadable content, Azuma chose not to incorporate them.

The series started on January 1, 2018, and the first tankōbon volume was released on August 9, 2018. The series sold well, with Azuma noting in 2019 that the third Japanese volume ran out of print, and due to fan demand Kodansha re-printed more copies. In January 2019, the series went on a one-month hiatus due to editorial issues. However, Azuma confirmed there were no major problems and ensured the manga would resume serialization smoothly. The manga ended serialization on August 10, 2020.

In July 2019, Seven Seas Entertainment announced that it licensed the manga for a North American release. The six volumes, with Japanese-to-English translation handled by Daniel Komen and J.P. Sullivan, were released from March 10, 2020, to August 31, 2021.

=== Volumes ===
No.	Original release date	Original ISBN	English release date	English ISBN
1	August 9, 2018	978-4-06-512269-3	March 10, 2020	978-1-64275-687-6
Round 1： "Member Select"; Round 2："Order Select"; Round 3: "Japan Team vs Yagami Team 1st" (チーム日本vsチーム八神1st); Round 4： "Japan Team vs Yagami Team 2nd" (チーム日本vsチーム八神2nd); Round 5： "Japan Team vs Yagami Team 3rd" (チーム日本vsチーム八神3rd)
2	January 1, 2019	978-4-06-514076-5	April 28, 2020	978-1-64505-184-8
Round 6："Japan Team vs Yagami Team 4th" (チーム日本vsチーム八神4th); Round 7："Japan Team vs Yagami Team 5th" (チーム日本vsチーム八神5th); Round 8："Interval"; Round 9："Team China vs Team Art of Fighting 1st" (チーム中国vsチーム龍虎1st"); Round 10："Team China vs Team Art of Fighting 2nd" (チーム中国vsチーム龍虎2nd")
3	May 9, 2019	978-4-06-515407-6	July 28, 2020	978-1-64505-481-8
Round 11："Team China vs Team Art of Fighting 3rd" (チーム中国v s チーム龍虎3 r d"); Round 12："Team China vs Team Art of Fighting 4th" (チーム中国v s チーム龍虎4 t h"); Round 13："Briefing"; Round 14："Team Ikari Warrior vs Team Mexico 1st" (チーム怒v s チームメキシコ1 s t); Round 15："Team Ikari Warrior vs Team Mexico 2nd" (チーム怒v s チームメキシコ2 n d")
4	November 8, 2019	978-4-06-517585-9	November 24, 2020	978-1-64505-788-8
Round 16："Team Ikari Warrior vs Team Mexico 3rd" (チーム怒v s チームメキシコ3rd); Round 17："Team Ikari Warrior vs Team Mexico 4th" (チーム怒v s チームメキシコ4th); Round 18："Strategy"; Round 19："K' Team vs South America Team 1st" (チームＫ´v s チームサウスアメリカ１ｓｔ); Round 20："K' Team vs South America Team 2nd" (チームＫ´v s チームサウスアメリカ２ｎｄ)
5	April 9, 2020	978-4-06-519051-7	May 18, 2021	978-1-64827-216-5
Round 21. "Team Psycho Soldier vs Sylvie Paula Paula" (サイコソルジャーチーム vs シルヴィ・ポーラ・ポーラ); Round 22："K' Team vs South America Team 3rd" (チームＫ´v s チームサウスアメリカ3rd); Round 23："K' Team vs South America Team 4th" (チームＫ´v s チームサウスアメリカ4th); Round 24："K' Team vs South America Team 5th" (チームＫ´v s チームサウスアメリカ5th); Round 25. "Team Villains vs Team Kim" (悪人あくにんチームvs キムチーム)
6	October 9, 2020	978-4-06-520854-0	August 31, 2021	978-1-64827-280-6
Round 26. "Cracks in the Sky"; Round 27. "Verse"; Round 28. "Reverse"; Round 29. "Conclusion"; Round 30. "A New Beginning"

== Reception ==
The series received generally positive reviews for its dynamic fight sequences and artwork, though some critics found the narrative lacking. Anime UK News awarded the first volume an 8 out of 10, commending its faithful adaptation of the game and the well-illustrated battles, particularly the clash between Kyo Kusanagi and Iori Yagami, which the reviewer found engaging due to their established rivalry. The OSAG rated it three out of five stars, criticizing the underdeveloped introduction of the cast but praising the tournament battles. Anime News Network argued that the manga would primarily appeal to existing fans of the franchise.

Manga Sanctuary thought, while the first volume felt like promotional material, the second one was an improvement with the introduction of Orochi, whose influence triggered Iori Yagami's berserk state—a callback to earlier games—making his battle with Kyo more compelling. The reviewer also praised Shun'ei's fight against Ryo Sakazaki for solidifying his role as Kyo's successor. AkibaStation observed that by the fourth volume the plot expanded with the reveal of manipulative factions like NESTS, which antagonized the cast in earlier games as it give Kula Diamond a more sinister portrayal.

Regarding the artwork, AkibaStation highlighted the visually striking duel between Kyo and Iori, noting Azuma's adherence to the games' aesthetic. Manga News praised the fight choreography for mirroring The King of Fighters XIV and appreciated Azuma's game-inspired omake. Anime News Network offered mixed criticism, stating that only the female characters were well-drawn. The OSAG maintained that the art and action sequences were the manga's strongest aspects, moreover enhanced by Azuma's detailed backgrounds.
