= Kunihiko Yasui =

Japanese voice actor

- 安井 邦彦
- Born: December 12, 1960 (age 65); Nagoya, Aichi, Japan
- Occupations: Voice actor, music navigator
- Agent: 81 Produce

Kunihiko Yasui (安井 邦彦, Yasui Kunihiko; born December 12, 1960 in Nagoya, Aichi, Japan) is a Japanese voice actor who graduated from the Aichi Prefecture. He is employed by the talent agency 81 Produce. He was also asked by SNK to participate as a member of SNK's character image band, Band of Fighters based on the game series King of Fighters, under the role of Iori Yagami.

== Filmography ==
=== Television animation ===
1990s

- Pretty Sammy (1995-1997) (Binpachi Hagakure)
- Azuki-chan (1995-1998) (Azuki's father)
- After War Gundam X (1996) (Rukusu) (eps. 25-28)
- Martian Successor Nadesico (1996-1997) (Supreme Commander Haruki Kusakabe)
- Paketsu de Gohan (1996-) (Richard, Sage)
- Sakura Diaries (1997) (Tatsuhiko Mashu)
- Bomberman B-Daman Bakugaiden (1998-1999) (Drakken)
- Case Closed (1998-)(Kenji (eps. 121-122), Noriyuki Shirakawa (eps. 217-218), Nobukazu Michiba (ep. 370), Kishiharu Torakura (eps. 712-715), Mineto Mayama (eps. 927-928))
- Gasaraki (1998) (Tamotsu Hayakawa) (ep. 1)
- Initial D (1998) (Hiromichi)
- Trigun (1998) (Dick)
- Master of Mosquiton (1998) (Dragon) (ep. 23)
- Bomberman B-Daman Bakugaiden Victory (1999-2000) (Devil Slinger)

2000s

- Wild Arms: Twilight Venom (2000) (Bounty Hunter A) (ep. 19)
- Hellsing (2001-2002) (Dr. Trevilian)
- PaRappa the Rapper (2001-2002) (Papa PaRappa)
- Stratos 4 (2003) (PR officer) (ep. 10)
- Ashita no Nadja (2003) (Ralph)
- Monster (2004) (Suicidal Man) (ep. 10)
- Starship Operators (2005) (Ricardo Faless) (eps. 3-4)
- The King of Fighters: Another Day (2005-2006) (Iori Yagami) (eps. 1, 4)
- Naruto (2006) (Yotaka)
- Kaiji: Ultimate Survivor (2007) (Emcee) (eps. 11-12), (Store manager) (ep. 10)
- Sgt. Frog (2007) (Giruru)
- Golgo 13 (2008) (Danny) (ep. 34)

2010s

- Naruto Shippuden (2010) (Gameru) (ep. 184)
- Kaiji: Against All Rules (2011) (Middle-aged customer) (ep. 9)
- Supernatural:The Anime Series (2011) (Zack Evans) (ep. 1)
- Servant × Service (2013) (Superior) (ep. 1)
- Attack on Titan (2013) (Preacher) (ep. 2)
- Fate/Extra Last Encore (2018) (Lu Bu Fengxian)

2020s

- Getter Robo Arc (2021) (Schwarzkopf)

=== Video games ===
Year	Title	Role	Console	Source
1995	The King of Fighters '95	Iori Yagami		
1996	The King of Fighters '96	Iori Yagami	Arcade, Neo Geo, Neo-Geo CD, Sega Saturn, PlayStation, Game Boy, PlayStation Network, Virtual Console	
1997	The King of Fighters '97	Iori Yagami	Arcade, Neo-Geo, Neo-Geo CD, Saturn, PlayStation, PlayStation 2, PlayStation 4, PlayStation Network, PlayStation Vita, Virtual Console, iOS, Android, Windows	
1997	Langrisser IV	Lanford	Saturn, PlayStation, PlayStation Network	
1998	The King of Fighters '98	Iori Yagami	Arcade, Neo Geo/CD, PlayStation, Dreamcast, PlayStation 2, PlayStation Network, Xbox Live Arcade, Virtual Console, iOS, Android, Windows, Nintendo Switch	
1998	The King of Fighters: Kyo	Iori Yagami	PlayStation	
1998	Slayers Royal 2	Robelt	Saturn, Sony PlayStation	
1999	The King of Fighters '99	Iori Yagami	Arcade, Neo Geo, Neo-Geo CD, PlayStation, Dreamcast, PlayStation Network, Wii Virtual Console, Windows, Nintendo Switch eShop	
2000	The King of Fighters 2000	Iori Yagami	Arcade, Neo Geo, Dreamcast, PlayStation 2, Windows, OS X, Linux, Nintendo Switch, Xbox One, PlayStation 4, Windows 10	
2001	Capcom vs. SNK 2	Iori Yagami	Arcade, Dreamcast, PlayStation 2, Xbox, GameCube, PlayStation Network	
2001	The King of Fighters 2001	Iori Yagami	Arcade, Neo Geo, Dreamcast, PlayStation 2, PlayStation Network, Windows	
2002	The King of Fighters 2002	Iori Yagami		
2003	SNK vs. Capcom: SVC Chaos	Iori Yagami	Arcade, Neo Geo AES, PlayStation 2, Xbox	
2003	The King of Fighters 2003	Iori Yagami	Arcade, Neo Geo, PlayStation 2, Xbox, PlayStation 3	
2005	The King of Fighters XI	Iori Yagami		
2007	Neo Geo Battle Coliseum	Iori Yagami	Arcade, PlayStation 2, Xbox 360 (via Xbox Live Arcade)	
2008	Tatsunoko vs. Capcom	Hurricane Polymar	Arcade, Wii	
2009	The King of Fighters XII	Iori Yagami		
2010	KOF Sky Stage	Iori Yagami	Arcade, Xbox 360	
2010	Neo Geo Heroes: Ultimate Shooting	Iori Yagami	PlayStation Portable	

- Iori Yagami in The King of Fighters series ('95 - XIII)
- Iori Yagami in the SNK vs Capcom series
- Uesugi Kenshin in Ikusagami
- Ranford in the Langrisser series
- Rospark the Floweroid in Mega Man ZX Advent
- Jushiro Sakaki in Samurai Shodown: Warriors Rage
- Zanzelman in Shinsetsu Samurai Spirits Bushidō Retsuden
- Kusakabe Haroki in the Super Robot Wars series
- Assassin and Berserker in Fate/Extra
- Lu Bu Fengxian, Darius III, Eric Bloodaxe, Hector and Li Shuwen in Fate/Grand Order
- Lu Bu Fengxian and Li Shuwen in Fate/Extella
- Atsushi Sakai in Yakuza 5

=== Tokusatsu ===
- Denji Sentai Megaranger (Nezi Black (ep 38-43, 48)
- Kamen Rider Agito Movie (Ant Lord/Formica Pedes) (voice of Rider Chips, Katsumi Shiono, Yuuki Anai)
- Juken Sentai Gekiranger (Five Venom Fist Confrontation Beast Snake-Fist Braco (ep 3-9), Mythical Beast Cerberus-Fist Kou (ep 43-44))
- Samurai Sentai Shinkenger (Ayakashi Gozunagumo (ep 23-24))

=== Drama CDs ===
- Kami-sama wa Ijiwaru Janai (Ryou Tateno)
- The King of Fighters '97 Drama CD (Iori Yagami)
- The King of Fighters '98: The Dream Match Never Ends Drama CD (1998) (Iori Yagami)
- KOF: Mid Summer Struggle (Iori Yagami)
- The Sun and The Moon ~ Prologue (1999) (Iori Yagami)
- Samurai Shodown: Warriors Rage (drama) (2000) (Jushiro Sakaki)
- Koishikute (Takeshi Hatano)

=== Dubbing roles ===
==== Live-action ====
- Craig Parker
  - The Lord of the Rings: The Fellowship of the Ring (Haldir)
  - The Lord of the Rings: The Two Towers (Haldir)
- Beyond Borders (Elliott Hauser (Noah Emmerich))
- Con Air (Mike "Baby-O" O'Dell (Mykelti Williamson))
- Kiss the Girls (FBI Agent Kyle Craig (Jay O. Sanders))
- Liar Liar (Jerry (Cary Elwes))
- The Matrix (Agent Brown (Paul Goddard))
- Shining Time Station (Schemer (Brian O'Connor))
- Snake Eyes (Gilbert Powell (John Heard))
- A View to a Kill (2006 DVD edition) (Scarpine (Patrick Bauchau))
- Where the Heart Is (Forney Hull (James Frain))

==== Animation ====
- The Boondocks (Tom Dubois)
- Teen Titans (Warp)
- Ultimate Spider-Man (Norman Osborn/Green Goblin)

== Radio Shows ==
- Sunstar Midnight Harbour (FM Yokohama/FM802) (April 2011 – present)
