= Sōnosuke Nagashiro =

Japanese voice actor

Sōnosuke Nagashiro (長代 聡之介, Nagashiro Sounosuke) is a Japanese voice actor who is affiliated with the Osaka TV Talent Bureau (TTB) and a graduate of the Amusement Media Academy. He trained to be a chef until he was spotted by SNK for his voice.

== Voice roles ==
=== Anime ===
- The King of Fighters: Another Day (2006) – Ash Crimson (episode 4)

=== Video games ===
- SNK vs. Capcom: SVC Chaos (2003) – Balrog
- The King of Fighters 2003 (2003) – Ash Crimson
- The King of Fighters XI (2005) – Ash Crimson
- Doki Doki Akazukin (2007) – Mitchie
- The King of Fighters XII (2009) – Ash Crimson
- The King of Fighters XIII (2010) – Ash Crimson, Saiki, Evil Ash, Hwa Jai
- The King of Fighters All Star (2019–20) – Ash Crimson, Saiki
- The King of Fighters XV (2022) – Ash Crimson
