= Shun'ei =

Shun'ei is a Japanese name. It may refer to:

== People ==
- Katsukawa Shun'ei (1762–1819), a Japanese ukiyo-e artist
- Nishida Shun'ei (b. 1953), a Japanese painter
- Shun-ei Izumikawa, a Japanese astronomer

== Other ==
- NEC Shun-Ei, a Nihon Ki-in Go competition.
- Shun'ei (The King of Fighters), a fictional fighting game character from The King of Fighters figthing game series.
