= Sōnosuke =

- Gender: Male

Origin
- Origin: Japanese
- Meaning: Different meanings depending on the kanji used

Sōnosuke, Sonosuke or Sounosuke (written: 惣之助 or 聡之介) is a masculine Japanese given name. Notable people with the name include:

- Sonosuke Fujimaki (藤巻 惣之助; born 1939), Japanese fencer
- Sōnosuke Nagashiro (長代 聡之介; born 1975), Japanese voice actor

== Fictional ==
- Sonosuke Izayoi, in Danganronpa 3: The End of Hope's Peak High School
