= Masaaki Kukino =

Japanese video game producer

Masaaki Kukino (久木野 雅昭, Kukino Masaaki) is a Japanese video game producer. He worked for Konami, where he designed the arcade game Haunted Castle, and later worked for SNK Playmore.

Masaaki Kukino was born in Kurashiki, Okayama. He studied to become a clothing/textile designer. While he was researching a number of fashion companies & clothing brands, actually he came across an interesting arcade game company. So, he started to work as a producer, a designer, a director, making side-scrolling beat 'em ups, sports, action, driving, and gun (shooting) arcade games.

He is the producer of The King of Fighters XII and The King of Fighters XIII.

Masaaki Kukino left SNK Playmore in November 2010.
