= Eisuke Ogura =

Japanese game designer

Eisuke Ogura (Japanese: おぐら えいすけ, Hepburn: Ogura Eisuke) is a game designer working for SNK. Originally an artist for pixel animations and illustrations, Ogura became the creative director of the fighting game The King of Fighters XV.

== Career ==
Starting with The King of Fighters XIII, Ogura changed his style of illustrating characters by using darker colors than in previous games. Kyo Kusanagi is used as an example.

Eisuke Ogura joined SNK in 1996 and worked for the Fatal Fury series. His first title was Real Bout Special where he met his senior Yasuyuki Oda. He did pixel art starting from the port Dominated Mind, helped on others titles from the series. Ogura was famous for working in the game Garou: Mark of the Wolves. He tried to take advantage of Neo Geo's console limitations in order to create appealing 2D animations. Ogura also served as character designer for Ogre Battle Gaiden: Prince of Zenobia. However, by that time SNK fell into bankruptcy which depressed Ogura as most of his partners moved to other companies. Ogura became the main designer for most of The King of Fighters games starting with XII although he did multiple animations for The King of Fighters 2001.

Ogura expressed difficulties in the handling of the main characters like Kyo Kusanagi as he, despite often wearing different outfits for story arc, he was given a more masculine appearance for The King of Fighters XIII. Artist Ogura expressed pressure in drawing this incarnation of Kyo as it had to live up to a long reputation he has had ever since his introduction in 1994. When drawing Kyo in XIII, Ogura aimed to give him a darker style while giving the art further depth than in XII. In addition to the character illustrations and main visuals of this work, Ogura also worked on victory demo illustrations during the game. Ogura stated that designing Ash Crimson's final form was conceived shortly after he saw early designs of Saiki. Following this, Ogura tried drawing Ash's possessed form from The King of Fighters XIII where he was careful in showing that while the enemy's body is Ash's, the one fighting is Saiki as represented by his black flames. Despite early pressure about that, once seeing Saiki's similarities with Ash, Ogura managed to draw the Evil Ash easily. The idea behind this character was giving an vibe of a repulsive person while also coloring his outstanding black flames.

For The King of Fighters XIV, Ogura was also in charge of Athena Asamiya's look as the character always wears different clothing. Ogura is returning to make The King of Fighters XV but in the position of creative director with Tomohiro Nakata taking over his previous work. The team aims to improve the gameplay and graphics while also providing a more interesting story than the one from XIV. Besides working for games, Ogura was the main illustrator for the light novel The King of Fantasy. Across his years of working for The King of Fighters, Ogura took a liking to the rivalry between Kyo and Iori Yagami due to their mutual respect as views their team ups as natural since they are not ashamed of working together.
