= Takashi Ōhara =

Japanese voice actor

- 大原 崇
- Born: April 9, 1978 (age 48); Yokohama, Japan
- Occupation: Voice actor
- Agent: Ken Production
- Relatives: Sayaka Ōhara (sister)

Takashi Ōhara (大原 崇, Ōhara Takashi; born April 9, 1978 in Yokohama) is a Japanese voice actor who works for Ken Production. He has an older sister, Sayaka Ōhara, who is also a voice actress.

== Filmography ==
=== Television animation ===
2004

- Sgt. Frog – Students
- Bleach – Taishi Sakura

2005

- Emma: A Victorian Romance – Delivery man (ep 1)
- Kamichu! – Cat A (DVD ep 8), Agent (DVD ep 4), Hero (In Movie) (DVD ep 11), Leaf Spirit (DVD ep 1), Cat Sprite (DVD ep 2), Stundent Council President (DVD ep 10), /Noodle God (DVD ep 7)
- Cluster Edge – Cluster students)
- Angel Heart – Host
- Kotenkotenko – Vernon, White Rat

2006

- Gakuen Heaven – Nagahara, Student 1 (eps 8-10), Student B (ep 2), Swimming Club Captain (ep 3), Upperclassman 1 (handicrafts club; ep 13), Waiter (ep 7)
- Higurashi When They Cry – Delinquent 2 (eps 5, 16, 18)
- NANA – Convenience store clerk / Photographers
- The Story of Saiunkoku – Courtier (ep 8)
- Fairy Musketeers – Villager
- La Corda D'Oro - primo passo – Kaoru Morimiya
- 009-1 – Rider (ep 9)
- Happiness! – Yuuma Kohinata
- Ghost Slayers Ayashi – Kozuki
- Kekkaishi – Ishirou (ep 50), Tomonori Ichigaya

2007

- Nodame Cantabile – Male Student A (ep 5), Ryuuji Tsuboi (eps 20-21)
- Reideen – Crew
- Engage Planet Kiss Dum – Abd
- Over Drive – Player
- Bokurano – Kenji (eps 1-2)
- Kaze no Stigma – Furyou
- The Skull Man – Vigilant (ep 3)
- Devil May Cry – Customer A (ep 1), Treasure Hunter (ep 6)
- Mushi-Uta – Clerk
- Sky Girls – Aviation Festival Announcement
- Potemayo – Schoolboy, Geography Teacher
- Sketchbook ~full color'S~ – Raika Kamiya
- Neuro - Supernatural Detective – Entourage, Police
- You're Under Arrest: Full Throttle – Motorcycle police personnel
- Mobile Suit Gundam 00 – Ming (ep 10)
- Kimikiss pure rouge – Chauffeur (ep 12), Soccer Club Advisor (6 episodes), Soccer Club Member (ep 4)
- Hatarakids My Ham Gumi – Alan
- Genshiken 2 – Sai Bouzu (ep 1)

2008

- Clannad – Other school student (ep 17)
- Shugo Chara! – Higeshiro's Apprentice (ep 46)
- Minami-ke: Okawari – Haru's Replacement (ep 12), Haruka's homeroom teacher (ep 2), Teacher A (ep 9)
- Aria the Origination – Husband (ep 11)
- Noramimi – Character Post Staff (eps 9-10)
- Allison & Lillia – Engineer (ep 16) Pilot (ep 17)
- Macross Frontier – Henry Gilliam (ep 1)
- Blassreiter – Philip (eps 3, 5, 7-8)
- Nabari no Ou – Classmate (ep 2), Teacher (ep 15)
- Psychic Squad – Brigade Member (ep 3), Group Member
- Monochrome Factor – Band member (ep 1)
- Uchi no 3 Shimai – Doctor
- Kyōran Kazoku Nikki – Priest (ep 1), Subordinate C (ep 10), Suzuki (ep 4), White ape (ep 5)
- Sekirei – Covert Op B (ep 1)
- Birdy the Mighty: Decode – Masakubo
- Nogizaka Haruka no Himitsu – Mech-san (ep 4)
- Toradora! – boy (eps 4, 12), Murase (student council; ep 16), schoolboy (eps 2, 21), student council member (ep 11)
- Legends of the Dark King: A Fist of the North Star Story – Club (ep 8), Riga (ep 10)
- Tales of the Abyss – York (ep 7)
- Kemeko Deluxe! – Researcher
- Kannagi: Crazy Shrine Maidens – Male customer (ep 6), Male student (eps 3, 5), Prank call (ep 11)
- Magician's Academy – Mikhail
- Tytania – Alan Mahdi
- Nodame Cantabile: Paris – Examiner (ep 1)

2009

- Battle Spirits: Shōnen Toppa Bashin – Guard B (ep 37), Track Team Member A (ep 30)
- Samurai Harem – Male student, Twink, Assassin, Butler
- Birdy the Mighty Decode:02 – Masakubo
- Phantom: Requiem for the Phantom – Students
- Pandora Hearts – Grim
- Basquash! – Audience (ep 4), FFF (eps 5, 7), Man C (ep 3), Opponent A (ep 11), Reporter (ep 9), Salesman (ep 6), Surveying engineer (ep 14)
- Polyphonica Crimson S – Students
- Guin Saga – Eku (ep 8), Mongauli Soldier (ep 10)
- Fullmetal Alchemist: Brotherhood – Knox's Son (ep 31)
- Hatsukoi Limited – Teacher, staff swimming, tennis club manager
- CANAAN – Secret Service B (ep 6)
- Tokyo Magnitude 8.0 – Hyper rescue team, emergency personnel
- Modern Magic Made Simple – Shop manager (ep 1)
- Battle Spirits: Shōnen Gekiha Dan – Bodyguard 2 (ep 10), Chairman (ep 14)
- Queen's Blade 2: The Evil Eye – Customer A (ep 6), Elf (ep 4)
- A Certain Scientific Railgun – Anti-Skill (ep 17), Bank robbery (ep 1), Hoodlum A (ep 14), Okahara Ryouta (ep 12), Teacher (eps 7-8)
- Yumeiro Pâtissière – French language teacher (ep 17), Satō (15 episodes), Shigeru Amano (6 episodes)
- Nogizaka Haruka no Himitsu: Purezza – Manager (ep 10)

2010

- Shugo Chara!! Doki— – Shūsui Sōma (ep 79)
- Chu-Bra!! – Student
- Heartcatch Precure! – Theater club member (ep 16)
- Maid Sama! – Customer (ep 4), Guy B (ep 5), Shop attendant (ep 11), Takashi Ogimoto (eps 3, 12), Takezawa (ep 1)
- Ichiban Ushiro no Dai Mao – Young man (ep 4)
- Mayoi Neko Overrun! – Youth group
- Uragiri wa Boku no Namae o Shitteiru – Jekyll (eps 7-8, 10-13)
- The Tatami Galaxy – Man B (ep 1)
- Battle Spirits: Brave – Ed (ep 11)
- Yumeiro Pâtissière SP Professional – Satou

2011

- Bakugan Battle Brawlers: Gundalian Invaders – Child (ep 4), Ethan/Jesse
- Inazuma Eleven GO – Tsurugi Kyousuke
- Chihayafuru – Akito Sudō

2012

- Natsuiro Kiseki – Fujii
- Inazuma Eleven GO 2: Chrono Stone – Kuosu, Tsurugi Kyousuke
- Natsuyuki Rendezvous – Deliveryman (ep 2)

2013

- Chihayafuru 2 – Akito Sudō

2014

- Buddy Complex – Ryutaro Imajo
- Gundam Build Fighters Try – Shunsuke Sudou
- The Irregular at Magic High School - Shun Morisaki

=== Original video animation (OVA) ===
- Birdy the Mighty Decode: The Cipher (2009) – Masakubo
- TO Daen Kidou (2009) – Tokio

=== Films ===
- Macross Frontier: Itsuwari no Utahime (2009) – Henry Gilliam
- Magical Girl Lyrical Nanoha The MOVIE 1st (2010) – Armed bureau staff B
- Macross Frontier: Sayonara no Tsubasa (2011) – Henry Gilliam
- Inazuma Eleven GO vs. Danbōru Senki W (2012) – Tsurugi Kyousuke

=== Tokusatsu ===
- Kamen Rider Drive (2015) – Bat-Type Roidmude 007/Sword Roidmude (Chest core) (ep 25, 26)

=== Video games ===
- The Sniper 2 (2002) – Stanley Jones
- Angel's Feather (2004) – Yousuke Tsuji
- Samurai Shodown V Special (2004) – Shiro Tokisada Amakusa
- Mystereet ~Yasogami Kaoru no Chousen!~ (2006) – Escort Man, Minoru Fujimichi, Danshaku Kazatsumari, Driver
- EVE ～new generation～ (2006) – Yoshi
- Luminous Arc (2007) – Kai
- Class of Heroes (2008) – Male Fairy
- Mobile Suit Gundam 00 Gundam Meisters (2008) – General Soldier B
- Arc Rise Fantasia (2009) – Mark
- Souten no Kanata (2009) – Le Fang
- Phantasy Star Portable 2 (2009) – Inheruto company employees
- Macross Triangle Frontier (2011) – A# Hero
- Ni no Kuni (2011) – Rodekku
- Star Fox 64 3D (2011) – Fox McCloud, Leon Powalski
- The Legend of Zelda: Skyward Sword (2011) – Link
- Generation of Chaos 6 (2012) – Ryan / Reryi Lara
- Inazuma Eleven GO 3: Galaxy (2014) – Tsurugi Kyousuke
- Dynasty Warriors 8: Empires (2014) – Xun Yu
- Mario Kart 8 (2014) – Link
- The King of Fighters XIV (2016) – Shun'ei
- Final Fantasy XV (2016) – Loqi Tummelt
- Snack World: The Dungeon Crawl – Gold (2018) – Vinsant, Avatar (Male)
- Dynasty Warriors 9 – Xun Yu
- Super Smash Bros. Ultimate (2018) - Fox McCloud, Mii Fighter Type 3
- Warriors Orochi 4 – Xun Yu (also in Ultimate)
- Starlink: Battle for Atlas (2019) – Fox McCloud, Leon Powalski
- The King of Fighters XV (2022) – Shun'ei

=== Dubbing ===
- Fanboys, Windows (Jay Baruchel)
- The Jane Austen Book Club, Trey (Kevin Zegers)
- The Resident, Devon Pravesh (Manish Dayal)
