= Ash Crimson =

Fictional character from The King of Fighters

- The King of Fighters character
- Ash Crimson in The King of Fighters XI
- First game: The King of Fighters 2003 (2003)
- Created by: S.K
- Voiced by: Japanese: Sōnosuke Nagashiro

In-universe information
- Fighting style: Personal style (employing special green flames)

Ash Crimson (Japanese: アッシュ・クリムゾン, Hepburn: Asshu Kurimuzon) is a character in The King of Fighters fighting game series developed by SNK Playmore. His first appearance was in The King of Fighters 2003 as leader of its Hero Team. Ash, a teenager, participates in the series' fighting tournaments. He employs a personal fighting style that involves pyrokinesis with green flames. Despite being the series' protagonist during its third story arc, Ash's behavior is generally antagonistic and he tries to steal powers from several recurring characters, leaving them powerless. His identity and intentions are further explored in the 2011 title, The King of Fighters XIII, and he has been featured in print adaptations and a drama CD based on the games.

SNK Playmore staff created Ash as an evil main character, in contrast to previous main characters. His moves have been reworked in every game in which he has appeared, gaining new techniques as a result of his actions or modified to balance the character roster. Critical response to Ash has been largely negative due to his androgynous appearance and his technique. In interviews and press releases, video game publisher UTV Ignition Entertainment noted that he was unpopular with Western gamers and his design was better suited to Japanese fans. Reception in later years has been slightly more positive, with the character's relationships and tragic story arc being well received.

== Appearances ==
=== In video games ===
Introduced in The King of Fighters 2003, Ash leads the New Hero Team of Duo Lon and Shen Woo which participates in a new King of Fighters tournament. After the tournament, he ambushes host Chizuru Kagura and steals her powers, telling Iori Yagami he will be his next opponent. In The King of Fighters XI, the character teams up with Oswald and Shen Woo. At the game's end Ash leaves his teammates to fight each other, after disclosing that Oswald's price for joining him was finding a drug he can only obtain after defeating their pharmacist's enemy, their own teammate Shen. He later finds a berserker, Iori, defeats him and steals his powers. When Ash's comrade Elisabeth Blanctorche accuses him of abandoning his original mission and becoming obsessed with power, he leaves after saying that Kyo Kusanagi will be his next victim. Ash also appears as an available fighter in the KOF: Maximum Impact 2's update KOF Maximum Impact Regulation A and The King of Fighters XII, games without a storyline.

In The King of Fighters XIII Ash is the only character not part of a team, and it is learned that he works for Those From the Past. However, he has a conflict with organization leader Saiki at the end of the game, with his real plan revealed. Ash is the final boss in The King of Fighters XIII as "Ash driven insane by the Spiral of Blood" (血の螺旋に狂うアッシュ, Chi no Rasen ni Kuruu Asshu) (also known as Evil Ash) with power stolen from Saiki, who is trying to possess him instead. He ultimately sacrifices himself to destroy Saiki, his very own ancestor. While Ash's memories start disappearing from almost every people who knew him, he still makes cameos in some endings.

It is revealed in The King of Fighters XIV that Ash is trapped in a time vortex, with an entity known as Verse enveloping him. With Verse's defeat as his reality manipulation energy spreads around worldwide, Kukri and Elisabeth finally found Ash alive. Due to the ongoing multiversal crisis which revives many deceased fighters like himself in his home universe, he returns in The King of Fighters XV, accompanied by his childhood friend Elisabeth, and their new ally, Kukri, and manage to survive the event without ceasing from existence, thanks to Kukri's confirmation of the outcome on defeating Otoma=Raga, thus finally live peacefully with Elisabeth once again.

Outside The King of Fighters, the character appears in a dating sim part of the Days of Memories series.

=== In other media ===
Ash has made appearances in various other King of Fighters media as well. In the fourth chapter of the anime The King of Fighters: Another Day, he sets fire to a city to lure Kyo into a trap. He is also prominent in the manhua adaptations of The King of Fighters 2003 by Wing Yang and King Tung. In the 2003 tournament, Ash's team is defeated in the final by K' but later helps him defeat the demon Mukai. Although he is not part of the recurring tournament in The King of Fighters XII manhua, he briefly confronts Kyo in an attempt to steal his powers. Ash also appears in the CD drama KOF: Mid Summer Struggle, which has a mock King of Fighters tournament.

== Creation and development ==
Ash was designed as an "attractive evil character", in contrast to previous King of Fighters heroes. The supervising designer created the character as desired, with few changes since conception. When The King of Fighters 2003 was released and Ash introduced, the staff did not want to disclose information about him, instead telling fans to look forward to his "exploits." His canonical height is 178 cm (5'10") and he weighs 59 kg (130 lbs). According to a staff member, Falcoon, the goal was to make Ash an ambiguous protagonist who made players "feel bad" for cheering for him. Although Falcoon did not design the character, he added details while illustrating him. Akihiko Ureshino said Ash has the weakest relationships among protagonists. Although it is not clearly depicted, these three are probably just friends who happened to be in Shanghai at the time of "2003" and became acquainted with each other. One of them is a traitorous teenager with no sense of ethics, and the other is a thug that the yakuza would avoid and an assassin possessed by a vengeful spirit, so there is no room for friendship to be born there. However, the ending of XIII was written to stand out their connections. Since the "Ash arc" and the Maximum Impact games were developed at the same time, Ureshino decided to write a subplot in the latter work where Ash is depicted as a puppeteer who manipulates Kyo Kusanagi and Iori Yagami at the same time, most notably in the original net animation Another Day. His moves were named after months from the French Republican calendar.

Due to Ash's late appearance in The King of Fighters 2003, the staff joked that teammate Shen Woo seemed more like the series' main character than Ash did. One of three reasons for the title of KOF: Maximum Impact 2 Regulation "A" was Ash's introduction to the spin-off series. Falcoon called the character "really wild" because of his role in the series and his personality. Artist Nona said that of the original King of Fighters characters, he liked Ash and looked forward to his development.

Elisabeth, who first appears in XI, is written by Ureshino as Ash's former guardian and older sister figure, a woman who believed in the clan's mission and guided Ash in a similar fashion Chizuru Kagura from the Orochi arc video games. It is more affectionate towards Ash, and feels something similar to familial love or even romantic feelings. In The King of Fighters XII Ash was the character the staff worked on the most, reworking his movements and speech to be more consistent with the rest of the cast. The King of Fighters XIII producer Kei Yamamoto jokingly called him a character players could use to "show off". His EX version in the game makes more multiple hits than his regular form, and the "disgusting" style of his "Génie" (ジェニー) move is said to fit his character. Since his introduction, Ash has acquired new moves in accordance with his action in the series. After The King of Fighters 2003 Ash gained Chizuru Kagura's "Germinar" (ジェルミナール), a move allowing him to steal his opponents' special moves. After defeating Iori Yagami, the character acquired the "Fructidor" (テルミドール) Neo Max move (his strongest attack in The King of Fighters XIII). During the game's development, the staff considered returning Fructidor's animation style to an earlier version they had tested.

For The King of Fighters XIII, producer Kei Yamamoto wanted gamers who had played previous titles with Ash to consider the character's motivation and whether they could relate to him. Artist Eisuke Ogura stated that designing Ash's final form was conceived shortly after he saw early designs of Saiki. Following this, Ogura tried drawing Ash's possessed form from The King of Fighters XIII where he was careful in showing that while the enemy's body is Ash's, the one fighting is Saiki as represented by his black flames. Despite early pressure about that, once seeing Saiki's similarities with Ash, Ogura managed to draw the Evil Ash easily. The idea behind this character was giving a vibe of a repulsive person.

For The King of Fighters XV, designer Tomohiro Nakata said several fans already knew The King of Fighters XIV would tease his return. In his reappearance in XV, Ash was given a new design reminiscent of the original one. While SNK looked forward to his interactions to his previous enemies Chizuru and Iori, they were also glad that he managed to join his friend Elizabeth for the first time in the franchise due to their close relationship. During the development stage, there was a plan to introduce a beautiful girl character who would make fans suspect, "Maybe this girl likes Ash?", so if that girl had actually appeared, Elizabeth might have become more like Chizuru, or conversely, more like Ash's girlfriend. In any case, with Ash safely returning in XV and the trouble that came with it being cleared up, the relationships between Ash and Betty, or between Ash and Shen and Duo Lon, may change in the future. After all, unlike the Sacred Treasures, who are forever haunted by the shadow of Orochi, Ash and his friends no longer have their nemesis, Saiki. Looking at it from another perspective, it could be said that he is unlikely to enter future KOFs unless he has some kind of strong motivation, but Ureshino feels that it would be fine for Ash to just relax and make a flower crown for Elizabeth rather than take part in a tournament.

== Reception ==
Ash Crimson's character had a mixed reception in video-game publications. Itmedia remarked his androgynous appearance, claiming he thought he was a woman the first the writer saw him and did not feel like an actual main character back in The King of Fighters 2003. Nevertheless, he liked the story of the mysterious character being connected to the Orochi. Lucas M. Thomas of IGN wrote that a major fan complaint was the character's strength in the games, which made him one of the strongest opponents despite an apparent lack of effort. According to Thomas, Ash is "nothing if not strange" and the writer lamented his many appearances in the KOF 2003 manhua compared with more-popular characters. GameType compared him to Guile and Remy from Street Fighter due to his special moves and felt the fact that he using flames as part of them felt obligatory for being a KOF protagonist. In a retrospective article, Polygon noted The King of Fighters story arcs involving the character fighting across in different eras with the era of K' starting in The King of Fighters '99 where he replaces the previous protagonist Kyo as one of the most marketable characters often seen in promotional artwork from the game. However, with The King of Fighters 2003, K' would be replaced by Ash Crimson, marking the start of another era. This is noted by how the marketing of 2003 primarily focuses on Ash Crimson and colors reflecting his design. Magazine RetroManiac felt that despite being the new protagonist in 2003, the character failed obtain fans.

When playable characters for the arcade version of The King of Fighters XIII were introduced, Anime News Network's Todd Ciolek speculated about Ash's lack of teammates and wondered if he was alone because "no one likes Ash now." Marissa Meli of UGO Networks ranked Ash sixteenth on a list of "The Most Androgynous Video Game Characters", with Meli jokingly attributing his androgynous appearance to a desire by Japanese designers to confuse Western gamers about their sexuality. Writers for Game Informer joked about their surprise at the discovery that Ash is a male character. After UTV Ignition Entertainment polled fans to choose an artbox for console versions of The King of Fighters XII, the company announced that Ash's unpopularity reduced the number of potential covers to two (featuring Kyo and Iori). Den of Geek described Ash as one of the best The King of Fighters with the writer comparing him with Loki based on their antagonistic and tricky behaviour as well as how his heroic traits in KOF XIII gave fans different thoughts, while Complex described him as one of gaming's "douchiest" characters androgynous look as well as how he steals the powers of Chizuru Kagura and Iori Yagami.

In an interview with Ignition Entertainment director of business development Shane Bettehausen, Alex Lucard of Diehard GameFan said that North American SNK fans detested Ash and complained about his inclusion in The King of Fighters XII without a storyline while popular series characters were overlooked. Bettehausen defended the character, calling him "nuanced and improved" and his moves "incredibly effective". In June 2009, Stephen Totilo of Kotaku interviewed Bettehausen, who asked him while Totilo was playing to guess Ash's gender. When Totilo said the character was female, Betehausen called KOF "progressive" in introducing a cross-dressing character and said that fans were apparently "warming up to him". On Destructoid, Jonathan Holmes praised Ash's character as "defying traditional gender roles while kicking some ass" and called him "the perfect mascot for the KoF series as a whole."

In retrospect, Famitsu noted Ash Crimson came across as a surprise to gamers for his ambiguous characterization as even though he is supposed to be third hero of KOF, the ending of the Sacred Treasures Team makes him look like a villain when attacking Chizuru Kagura and stealing the sources of her powers. This resulted in several mysteries that the audience wanted SNK to explore in future games. In the demo of The King of Fighters XIII it was revealed that Ash works from "Those Who Come From That Faraway Land" who serve as the main villains. The fact that the story mode reveals that Ash is working for Saiki further explores the ambiguity he is involved with until the revelation he was just an agent. In regards to his final boss form possessed by Saiki, Famitsu regarded him as a strong opponent based on how he abuses projectiles. In retrospect, Excite called him a rare character not only as a protagonist like Kyo or K', but even in fighting games as a whole, with his easygoing personality and character design giving off a very strong personality. His debut in KOF XV brought surprises to the audience in general since The King of Fighters XIII had him stop existing after the fight with Saiki and XIV revealed that he managed to survive. In "Celebrating Queerness in Fighting Games", Ariel Litwak from The Michigan Daily said Ash appears to be an androgynous male character and as a foil to the very masculine series protagonists alongside Remy from Street Fighter III. While saying both are "gender-nonconformity signifying non-heroism" with antagonism towards the male characters leading the story, Ash managed to remain in The King of Fighters for more installments than Remy did in Street Fighter.
