= The King of Fighters XII =

2009 video game

- Developer: SNK Playmore
- Publishers: AMI (Arcade): JP: SNK Playmore; NA: Namco Bandai Games; EU: Ignition Entertainment
- Producer: Masaaki Kukino
- Artist: Falcoon (Tatsuhiko Kanaoka)
- Series: The King of Fighters
- Platforms: Arcade, PlayStation 3, Xbox 360
- Release: Arcade: JP: April 10, 2009; PlayStation 3 & Xbox 360: WW: July 28, 2009; EU: September 25, 2009
- Genre: Fighting
- Modes: Single-player, multiplayer
- Arcade system: Taito Type X2

The King of Fighters XII (Note: Japanese: ザ・キング・オブ・ファイターズ XII) (KOF XII) is a 2009 fighting game developed and published by SNK Playmore for arcades. It is the twelfth installment in The King of Fighters series of fighting games, following The King of Fighters XI (2005). Built on Taito Type X2 hardware, home ports were released for Xbox 360 and PlayStation 3. Similarly to KOF '98 and KOF 2002, this game does not have a storyline, but it is the third chapter in the Tales of Ash Saga that started in KOF 2003.

The King of Fighters XII received a mixed reception, with criticism given to its roster, gameplay and lack of single-player content. SNK Playmore responded a year later with a follow-up, The King of Fighters XIII (2010).

== Gameplay ==
The King of Fighters XII uses the usual 3-on-3 team system with each fight consisting of up to five rounds. However, the Tactical Shift System from The King of Fighters 2003 has been removed. KOF XII also introduces the "critical counter" system. During a match, a bar beneath the player's vitality will fill. When it is full and a player lands a strong punch as a counter, the character enters into a critical counter mode where the player has a short amount of time during which their character can link multiple attacks together. Once the critical counter's time period has expired, the player can finish with a special move. The new "Guard Attack" feature allows a fighter to intercept and hit an incoming opponent's strike damage-free (even Desperation Moves can be repelled in this fashion). Finally, there is also a "clash" system in place (called the Sousai or "Deadlock") whereupon every time characters land blows on one another with matched timing, the engine will generate a 'break' effect and push the characters away from one another into a neutral standing. As happened with The King of Fighters '98 and The King of Fighters 2002, the game does not contain a storyline, allowing the return of several characters depending on their status in the series. Additionally, there are no official teams, leaving the player to create any team to use. Players can still dash, backstep, and perform rolls as their evade. The Guard Breaks from previous games can now be done at any time.

== Characters ==
The arcade version of the game features a roster of 20 playable KOF competitors, which is half the number of characters featured in KOF 2003. With the exception of the return of Elizabeth from the previous KOF XI and the debut of Raiden from Fatal Fury in the series, the character roster is composed primarily of characters from KOF '96, with the majority of them reverting to their classic KOF and pre-KOF (with the exception of a Classic Iori that was originally planned) designs and move set as the SNK staff wanted to return to the original concept from The King of Fighters series. Raiden, however, was initially meant to appear as his unmasked persona from Fatal Fury 2, "Big Bear"; in order to add more villains to the game, the SNK staff decided to use his Raiden persona, which was one of the sub-bosses from the first Fatal Fury. Due to half of the intended roster being scrapped from development, KOF XII does not feature any of the pre-defined teams traditionally featured in the series, despite presence of members from recurring teams such as the ones from the Orochi Saga, the scrapped characters would later make their way in the roster of KOF XIII. The home versions feature two additional characters: Mature, one of Iori Yagami's teammates from The King of Fighters '96, and Elisabeth Blanctorche, who starred in KOF XI as the leader of the Rivals Team. Both characters sport new outfits.

- Andy Bogard
- Ash Crimson
- Athena Asamiya
- Benimaru Nikaido
- Chin Gentsai
- Clark Still
- Duo Lon
- Elisabeth Blanctorche (Note: Console-only)
- Goro Daimon
- Iori Yagami
- Joe Higashi
- Kim Kaphwan
- Kyo Kusanagi
- Leona Heidern
- Mature
- Raiden
- Ralf Jones
- Robert Garcia
- Ryo Sakazaki
- Shen Woo
- Sie Kensou
- Terry Bogard

== Development ==
An example of how NeoGeo's sprite of Kyo Kusanagi was redrawn for The King of Fighters XII.

At the Arcade Operators Union Amusement Expo (AOU) 2008, the game was first announced. SNK decided to create the new graphics during 2005 and 2006, and commented that they spent more than three times longer developing it than the previous game. A location test was scheduled in April, but it was canceled since SNK was looking at games made by other companies. They mentioned that if they released in April 2008, they would have developed the game with less than 20 characters. As such, they decided to wait for more information from the location test. In March 2009, Ignition Entertainment confirmed they would release the home version of the game worldwide for PS3 and Xbox 360. Shane Bettenhausen, Director of Business Development with Ignition, commented that they made the release worldwide in order to commemorate The King of Fighter's 15th anniversary.

In order to create the "ultimate 2D fighting game", SNK dropped all their old art and start again, It was later revealed at AOU 2008 that KOF XII would use newly drawn 2D sprites on detailed 2D backgrounds. Producer Masaaki Kukino informed Kotaku that the game is one hundred percent hand drawn, there being no cel shading in the game. due to negative reaction from the remake of The King of Fighters '94. Each character took between sixteen and seventeen months to be done by 10 designers together. However, this led to game having lowest amount of playable characters.

SNK wanted to create natural moves and more appealing designs. This led to a lack of narrative. Between all the characters that were redrawn, Ash took the most of the time. An artist labeled "Nona" made 2D character graphics in dot-pixel forms to which the SNK used 3D software tools to first make a 3D character. Nona and the staff added details to the original designs such as expressions and more descriptive clothes. The staff made fixes to each design to make the ones that would appear in the game. Nona found problems with the character designs due to their bigger sizes which also affected color palette and dot-pixels inclusion.

=== Home versions ===
The game was released for both PlayStation 3 and Xbox 360 consoles on July 28, 2009. SNK Playmore decided to use the PS3 as the PlayStation 2 would not have been able to handle the new graphics from the game. Some versions from the game also include English voices for each character, but the player is able to select between English and Japanese audio. SNK and Igntion later confirmed that the home version would have over twenty-two playable characters and at least two of them will be hidden. They also feature new bonus modes as well as a gallery and two types of control schemes to match player level. Although it has been reported that both consoles would be able to have different numbers of modes, Ignition's Director of Business Development, Shane Bettenhausen, confirmed both ports would have the same number of players. SNK Playmore also released a USB Arcade Stick of the game for the PlayStation 3 on July 16, 2009. Ignition Entertainment announced that there would be differences between the PlayStation 3 and Xbox 360 versions, with regards to online play. The PlayStation 3 version has clan options, while the Xbox 360 version uses TrueSkill.

To decide the cover for the Xbox 360 and PlayStation 3 ports, Ignition started a survey on May 4, 2009, in which users from their forum could vote between two covers they wanted to see in the game. While both covers use various characters, one uses Kyo Kusanagi in the center and the other Iori Yagami. When the two surveys ended, Ignition started two new ones, in which people had to vote between the previous winners and the Japanese covers from the game for both consoles.

Ignition Entertainment responded to the outcry from fans regarding online gameplay and attempted to negotiate with SNK Playmore to either implement a new netcode or to revise the current enough that the online play would become more suitable for smooth play.

== Reception ==
Reception

Aggregate scores
Aggregator	Score
GameRankings	PS3: 62.64% (25 reviews); Xbox 360: 63.46% (34 reviews)
Metacritic	PS3: 58/100; Xbox 360: 63/100

Review scores
Publication	Score
1Up.com	C
G4	2/5
GameSpot	5.0/10
IGN	6.0/10

During the 2009 E3, IGN awarded KOF XII as the best fighting game, noting the new graphics as well as the gameplay. On the other hand, in the Game Critics Awards from the E3 2009, KOF XII lost to Tatsunoko vs. Capcom: Ultimate All-Stars in the same category. It also won three Best Fighting Game of E3 2009 awards from GameSpot, 1UP.com and GameSpy.

Prior to its release, various video games publications have commented on KOF XII. Ryan Clements from IGN celebrated the new graphics as among the best that a 2D game could have. Although he noted the gameplay to be very similar to previous KOF games, he found satisfying the new game mechanics that allow players to counterattack opponents' combos. 1UP writer Richard Li found the gameplay to be a mix between Garou: Mark of the Wolves, Street Fighter III and The King of Fighters '94. Like Clements, Li found the gameplay similar to previous titles from the series, but noted that SNK added new revisions which make the game to be "a new experience." McKinley Noble from GamePro also liked the game's graphics, but most notably the background scenery of a European villa, which he noted to be a good example of the new design. Although he lamented the removal of various mechanics featured in previous games such as the Tactical Shift System, Noble liked the addition of the new critical counter systems as "split-second timing is a critical key for pulling out a decisive victory." Andy Eddy from Teamxbox.com found the new art style to be a bit weird due to the interpretations from various cultures as shown in the backgrounds as well due to the fact they are distracting from the fights. However, he liked the cast of playable character as well as the addition of Elizabeth and Mature to the home versions due their new designs and fighting styles.

Shortly following the release of the game, critical response has mostly been average or mixed. It received a C from 1UP's Richard Li who notes that various parts of the game would induce players to "rage quit" out of their matches. Graphics were commented to be initially good, but later criticized due how different some characters look in this game from previous KOF titles. IGN's Ryan Clements commented that despite graphical overhaul the game was "disappointing". He found the new graphics to be "smoothly animated", but added that the backgrounds are limited. Although Andrew Park from GameSpot praised the redesign from several characters' appearances and gameplay, he still noted that there are better 2D fighting video games due to how several features added in KOF XI were removed from KOF XII and the poor quality from the online mode. GamingAge's Jim Cordeira gave it a C+ commenting "It's a reboot/re-birth alright, albeit a seemingly unfinished one." Although he also added that KOF XII "is a good enough start", he remarked that other fighting games such as Street Fighter IV or BlazBlue: Calamity Trigger were more entertaining.

In the website GameRankings, the PS3 version of KOF XII received a percent of 60.82% based on eleven reviews. The Xbox 360 version was given a percent of 66.13% based on fifteen reviews. Metacritic gave the PS3 game an average of 58 based on ten critics while the Xbox 360 received an average of 63 based on seventeen reviews.

== Other media ==
SNK Playmore developed the cellphone series KOFXII Tokusetsu Corner for Yahoo and imode networks on August 1, 2008. They initially developed four backstories based on the characters for the series. Months later, SNK published these novelizations in the official website from the game along with the addition of new ones based on Athena Asamiya, Shen Woo and Kim Kaphwan. In April 2009, Lucky Dragon Comics and Animation LTD will publish a new comic series based on KOF XII and KOF 2002: Unlimited Match. It will be written by Nekketsu Otto and illustrated by Khoo Fuk Lung. A guidebook from the game was also released on July 30, 2009. The same guidebook was published in North America on August 28, 2009, by BradyGames.
