= Iori Yagami =

Fictional character from The King of Fighters video game series

- The King of Fighters character
- Iori Yagami's first outfit by Eisuke Ogura
- First game: The King of Fighters '95 (1995)
- Designed by: Yuichiro Hiraki
- Portrayed by: Will Yun Lee (2010 film)
- Voiced by: Japanese; Kunihiko Yasui (KOF '95 - Neo Geo Heroes: Ultimate Shooting); Takanori Hoshino (KOF XIV onwards); Chisa Horii (female; SNKH: TTF); Sho Sudo (Japanese dub of the King of Fighters movie)

In-universe information
- Fighting style: Yagami style of ancient martial arts + Pure instinct
- Origin: Japan
- Nationality: Japanese

Iori Yagami (Japanese: 八神 庵, Hepburn: Yagami Iori) is a character from SNK's The King of Fighters video game series. The character first appeared in The King of Fighters '95 as the leader of the Rivals Team, as the initial enemy and later rival of Kyo Kusanagi. Iori is the heir of the Yagami clan, who use pyrokinetic powers and sealed the Orochi devil along with the Kusanagi and Yata clans. Iori suffers from a curse – "The Riot of the Blood" (血の暴走, Chi no Bōso) – under which he becomes faster, stronger and wilder, exhibiting a deadly tendency to indiscriminately attack everyone in close proximity. In this state, Iori is commonly called "Wild Iori" or "Orochi Iori" (月の夜大蛇の血に狂う庵, Tsuki no Yoru Orochi no Chi ni Kuruu Iori; lit. Insane Iori with Blood of Orochi Under the Night of the Moon). Aside from the main series, Iori appears in several other media series, including spin-offs, crossover video games and comic adaptations of the series.

Iori was created as Kyo's rival; his name and abilities were designed to relate him with the legend of Yamata no Orochi. The designers ended up liking him so much they are careful of the character's development as the series expands. As a result, Iori sometimes helps Kyo to have the opportunity to fight him. Finding his design appealing, new outfits presented the SNK staff with difficulties as they devised new appearances for the character that would retain his popularity.

Video game journalists have praised Iori Yagami as one of the most powerful characters in the series. Reviewers have also cited Iori as one of the best characters from the games, labeling him as a veteran character and praising his appearance as one of SNK's best creations. "Miss X", Iori's crossdressing form from SNK Gals' Fighters and the additional female one of SNK Heroines: Tag Team Frenzy, also received attention for its humor. A series of collectible items based on Iori's likeness, including key chains and figurines, have been manufactured.

== Conception and creation ==
Iori Yagami was created by Yuichiro Hiraki who aimed to create an ideal rival to Kyo Kusanagi's character; Since Kyo hot-blooded in some ways, the development team just assumed Iori would be the opposite, cool and blue-blooded. Iori's name is loosely based on the Japanese mythological creature Yamata no Orochi. In contrast to Kyo's life, SNK decided to keep Iori's life as private despite some related material mentioning the fact that Iori has relatives. Though Iori and Kyo first meet in KOF, writer Akihiko Ureshino decided to take freedom in his novelizations to foreshadow more their meetings in novels. After watching fan reactions at initial location testing for King of Fighters '95, several staff members predicted Iori would be popular. Iori was created not only to the yang to Kyo's ying but also inherit the popularity of the Art of Fighting and Fatal Fury series. In order to stand out besides being Kyo's rival, the plot of the Orochi arc would give Iori a unique Desperation Move that symbolizes his clan's past when being corrupted by Orochi: the Forbidden Method 1211: Eight Maidens. The King of Fighters '96 was created to explore more the Orochi lore through the new host Chizuru Kagura who wants help from the protagonist and his rival.

Iori was originally introduced in The King of Fighters '95 as the leader of a team composed of Billy Kane, Eiji Kisaragi and himself. Each member shares a rivalry with another character in the game. Although the staff members worked hard to impress their superiors at SNK, Iori's characterization caused them to discard the team in the next game in the series. In the rival team's ending, Iori betrays Billy and Eiji, generating anger from the Art of Fighting developers for what Iori did to their character.

Iori is a berserker due to the Orochi demon blood within him. This version of the character, officially named "Orochi Iori", is hinted to have existed before his debut in The King of Fighters '97 as one of the game's mid-bosses. This form of Iori was designed to easily overpower other characters. Series' flagship director Toyohisa Tanabe states that the staff were initially reluctant to add this version of Iori to the series' roster; they were worried about fans' reactions but did so to add more impact to the Orochi saga's climax. Tanabe was particularly pleased to see surprised reactions from female fans to this form during KOF '97's location testing. Another minor development of the character was his change of "most valued possession/valued treasure" information. A girlfriend was also listed in The King of Fighters '95, The King of Fighters '99, and The King of Fighters 2000. Starting with The King of Fighters 2001 and every entry after that, however, the space is listed as "None". The SNK staff commented that it is curious that he does not have a girlfriend anymore.

=== Portrayal ===
After working in 10 KOF novelizations, Akihiko Ureshino noted that SNK used Kyo and Iori too much and believed they should be given a rest after The King of Fighters '97. Kyo and Iori were supposed to disappear due to business reasons or the requests of enthusiastic fans, but in the end they have continued to appear ever since. After taking a step back in the "Nests Saga" they are then playing important roles in the "Ash Saga". The problem is the positioning of these two within the Maximum Impact series. In the "Ash Saga" Kyo, Iori, and Chizuru's Three Sacred Treasures play a major role in the "Orochi demon Returns" type story, and in the previous "Nests Saga," Kyo was involved in the story to some extent, but not Iori, in terms of the connections with the new protagonist K'. However, the Miera brothers were the main focus of the Maximum Impact spin-offs relegating Kyo and Iori for the first time to minor characters. Both the Ash arc and Maximum Impact games were developed at the same time which resulted in Kyo and Iori still playing a major role in the Another Day original video animation that promotes Maximum Impact 2. While Kyo and Iori are always arguing with each other, Ureshino was careful with how writing them to the point their introduction in The King of Fighters '99 added a subtext of happiness of the two rivals meeting again, believing they had died when fighting Orochi and remained as hidden characters. By The King of Fighters XV, Ureshino aims to make the relationship between Iori and Kyo important, claiming that should something bad happen to Kyo's life, Iori would find no reason for existing. However, he refuses to make Iori act friendlier with Kyo and not mature as it would ruin his original appeal.

In an interview with Iori's Japanese voice actor, Kunihiko Yasui comments that he feels responsible as a voice actor for his performances as Iori, taking care to sound different in each installment as a means of developing and protecting his character's humanity. Yasui was replaced by Takanori Hoshino starting in The King of Fighters XIV; Hoshino said he was delighted to be the new voice actor of the character, thanking SNK. Chisa Horii voices Iori's female incarnation in SNK Heroines: Tag Team Frenzy.

=== Design ===
One of the planned objectives for The King of Fighters '95 was to properly introduce Iori as Kyo's rival. According to his creators, Iori's personality and other aspects of his character such as his phrases and unique moves "broke the mold for characters in fighting games at that time" resulting in a unique design from the point of view of the fans. Like Kyo, several aspects of Iori, including his surname and abilities, were designed to relate him to the Japanese legend Yamata no Orochi, which was the inspiration for the plot. The pixel art of Iori was made by Yuichiro Hiraki who, despite leaving SNK to work in another project a few years later, was asked by Capcom's Kaname Fujioka to once again work on the character's design for the crossover fighting game Capcom vs. SNK: Millennium Fight 2000. During the early development stages of The King of Fighters '99, SNK planned to exclude Iori and Kyo from the game because the company wanted to focus the story on the new protagonist, K'. They reversed this decision because of the characters' popularity. The repeated appearance of Iori, Kyo, and other SNK regular characters in the series is at the insistence of the marketers and main planners, making it a challenge to decide the story for each title. Because of his popularity among fans, some of the series' main designers have said Iori is "difficult to draw for". Illustrator Shinkiro said he thought Iori was one of the series' wildest characters because of his hairstyle; similar sentiments were expressed by Last Blade illustrator Tonko. KOF: Maximum Impact producer Falcoon stated that attempting to change an "untouchable" design such as Iori's put him under severe pressure. He stated that creating Iori's alternative design that appears in the Maximum Impact series almost felt "unforgivable" because he felt unsure of fans' reaction to the change.

For the Maximum Impact spin-off games, Iori's characteristic hairstyle was changed dramatically. Throughout the series, his normal costume consists of a short jacket and bondage pants; without changing his design and adjusting only his coloring, a diverse number of image variations can be brought about. In The King of Fighters XII and The King of Fighters XIII Iori and Kyo were meant to wear new outfit that emphasized their sexual appeal but due to time constraints, they were removed. As a result, they sport similar outfits to the ones seen in Ash arc though there was emphasis in giving Iori the same style. During the making of The King of Fighters XIV, Nobuyuki Kuroki wanted Iori, except the character's hair, to be redesigned. Character designer Eisuke Ogura created a new outfit for Iori and asked the modeler to focus on his masculinity and to pay close attention to the way the design of the character's eyes. This new design, alongside Kyo's, provoked controversy when it was revealed. KOF XIV director Yasuyuki Oda said the team wanted the characters to have new looks because the game is set in another story arc. A new design was created by Tomohiro Nakata for the next game, The King of Fighters XV; He expressed pressure of giving him a proper appeal that makes it worth of the character's fame. The new outfit focuses on red and black clothes and continue focusing on drawing the Yagami Crest of the moon in his back as usual.

=== Gameplay ===
When fighting, Iori employs the "Yagami style of ancient martial arts" as well as an art labelled as "Pure instinct" which involves the usage of purple flames. His strongest technique is known as Kin 1211 Shiki: Yaotome (禁千弐百拾壱式・八稚女; lit. "Forbidden Style 1211: Eight Maidens") which was created out of the need of making lore of the Orochi arc where Yasakani were revealed to have learned this skill from the antagonist alongside the Hakkesshu serving the main antagonist. Iori's brutal moves were also noted to be made in parallel with Mortal Kombat franchise due to the amount of blood loss victims of Iori's attacks suffer. In The King of Fighters XIII, Iori's gameplay mechanics were modified to become a close-range fighter. Despite losing his flaming techniques temporarily during KOF XIV, he continued fighting by using his fingernails like claws to scratch his opponents. Iori's strongest technique is "Forbidden 1218 Shiki: Yatagarasu" (禁千弐百拾八式・八咫烏), a new move that focuses on violent combinations and serves as a reference to the character's ending from The King of Fighters '96, in which he murders his teammates. Iori's 10th color scheme in the game matches that of his classic outfit. During development of the game, details were added to increase the similarities. This version, featuring his classic techniques, was designed to avoid surpassing the current Iori so players could choose the fighting style they prefer in the game. This was further emphasized in the console version of The King of Fighters XIII, in which Iori had his moveset were adjusted for better balance by not using flaming techniques. Meanwhile, the Orochi Iori version was designed to be more overpowered than regular playable character as result of being originally set as a boss.

As downloadable content for The King of Fighters XIII, SNK added the original Iori Yagami who can wield flames for his fighting style. This version was meant to be innovative similar rather than make him look like his classic The King of Fighters '95 persona. Despite being the same person, the playstyle of Iori's flames is highly different from the regular Iori whose attacks involve hand-to-hand combat. Nevertheless, he was balanced by SNK in order to avoid making the character be overpowered when exploring his special moves. Some distinguishable moves were given to him in order to give the player multiple options of tactics. This Neo Max was created with the idea of impressing gamers so that they would be attracted to use this version of the character. In KOFXIV, the commands for Iori's moves were also affected; one of his strongest attacks, the Ura 316 Shiki Saika (裏参百拾六式・豺華), would require high skill for regular players because SNK attempted to balance the characters. Oda wanted to keep his gameplay intact in order to avoid fan backlash.

== Appearances ==
=== In video games ===
==== In The King of Fighters series ====
Iori is a violent, sadistic person who suffers from trauma because of his clan's past. In ancient times, the Yagami clan was known as the Yasakani who, With the help of the Yata and Kusanagi clans, sealed the snake demon Orochi. As time passed, the Yasakani clan grew tired of living in the shadow of the Kusanagi and made a blood pact with Orochi that gave them greater powers but cursed the clan and its descendants forever. They renamed their clan the Yagami and set out to destroy the Kusanagi with their new powers.

Iori Yagami first appeared in The King of Fighters '95, in which he enters an annual tournament as the leader of the Rival Team with Billy Kane and Eiji Kisaragi. After the team fails to defeat Kyo's team, Iori betrays his teammates. In the next video game, Iori teams up with two women, Vice and Mature, servants of the Orochi demon. During the '96 competition, Iori meets Chizuru Kagura, the heir of the Yata clan gathers Kyo and Iori who defeat the Orochi servant Goenitz. In the aftermath, Iori loses control of his curse, resulting into him killing Vice and Mature. Iori continues to suffer from multiple outbreaks; during The King of Fighters '97 he attacks other team members and appears as a sub-boss character in the game. He later joins Chizuru and Kyo to confront and seal the revived Orochi.

In most versions of The King of Fighters '99, Iori is a secret character that can be faced as a bonus fight at the end of the game if the player scores enough points. In the story, Iori discovers the creation of Kyo clones and enters the annual tournament, where he finds those responsible, an organization named NESTS. Iori follows the battles in secret and fights against the NESTS' agents to continue his fight against Kyo. In The King of Fighters 2001, an agent named Seth invites Iori to join his team for the next King of Fighters tournament, assuming he would get his shot against Kyo. While his regular form appears in KOF 2002, his Orochi form is also featured in the PlayStation 2 port of the game and the remake of KOF '98.

In The King of Fighters 2003, Chizuru appears to both Kyo and Iori, asking them to form a team and investigate suspicious activities concerning the Orochi seal. During the investigation, the team is ambushed by the fighter Ash Crimson, who plans to get the power from the descendants of the clans who sealed Orochi and steals the ones from Chizuru. In the The King of Fighters XI, Iori and Kyo form a team with Kyo's student Shingo Yabuki to fill Chizuru's spot to stop Ash. Thee strengthening presence of Orochi causes Iori to enter the Riot of Blood state, in which he attacks his comrades. Ash appears afterward and defeats Iori, stealing his powers. Iori is a playable character in The King of Fighters XII, in which he is featured with a different outfit and a new moveset that does not use purple flames. He does not have a team. Iori's appearance in The King of Fighters XIII sees him teamed with Mature and Vice, his teammates from the 1996 tournament who return as spirits. Following Ash's disappearance, Iori recovers his flames at the end and appears as downloadable content in this form.

He returns in The King of Fighters XIV, in which he seals the weakened snake demon with the help of Kyo and Chizuru. Iori wears a new costume in the game and his classic one appears as downloadable content. He appears once more in The King of Fighters XV, now teamed up with Chizuru Kagura and his rival Kyo Kusanagi.

==== Other games ====
The three looks of Miss X from SNK Heroines: Tag Team Frenzy

In The King of Fighters: Kyo, a role-playing video game set before the events of KOF '97, Iori appears as Kyo's antagonist in his journey around the world. Both King of Fighters R-1 and King of Fighters R-2 feature the regular Iori and his berserker form as playable characters; the latter game features him as a teamless character. Iori appears in the spin-off video games Maximum Impact series. In the North American editions of Maximum Impact, Iori is voiced by Eric Summerer. Iori appears as a sub-boss in The King of Fighters Ex: Neo Blood, which is set after his fight against Orochi. Although Iori enters the tournament to fight Kyo, Geese Howard, the organizer of the tournament, tries but fails to make him awaken his Riot of the Blood to absorb his powers. In The King of Fighters EX2: Howling Blood, Iori enters another tournament and is joined by two women who want to find a man controlled by the Orochi power. The shooter game KOF: Sky Stage also features Iori as a boss, while Neo Geo Heroes: Ultimate Shooting makes him playable. He is also featured in KOF X Arena Masters, Game of Dice The King of Fighters All Star. and the Korean fighting game The King of Cyphers. SNK also released a pachinko based on the Orochi storyline. as well as the otome game King of Fighters for Girls.

Iori also appears in SNK's hand-held game, SNK Gals' Fighters, as a comical interpretation called Miss X (ミス X, Misu Ekkusu). The character insists he is a female in order to participate in the game's Queen of Fighters tournament, though several female fighters easily see through his disguise. He is also present in The Rhythm of Fighters. Miss X reappears in the fighting game SNK Heroines: Tag Team Frenzy as downloadable content, this time sharing both the original crossdresser and new true gender swapped form. In the story, Miss X fights against multiple female fighters (including his fellow gender-swapped fighters Terry Bogard and the guest fighter Skullomania) to stop the host Kukri and his ending involves an embarrassing nightmare in which he and Kyo become friendly rivals. In the crossover video games NeoGeo Battle Coliseum and SNK vs. Capcom series, Iori appears as a playable character; the latter includes his Riot of the Blood state. His character is also a boss character (along with Geese) in the Game Boy version from Real Bout Fatal Fury Special. He also appears in Square Enix's fighting game Million Arthur: Arcana Blood. He is also available in the King Fighters X Fatal Fury mobile phone game. He is also present in the Chinese mobile phone game named KOF: WORLD, the visual novel Days of Memories, Metal Slug Defense, Lords of Vermillion, and Lucent Heart. The character's original look is also being used in action role-playing Phantasy Star Online 2.

Additionally, Iori Yagami made his appearance as playable guest character in War Song, a multiplayer online battle arena developed by Morefun Studio, a game studio owned by Tencent. Iori also appears as one of the background characters on the King of Fighters Stadium stage in Super Smash Bros. Ultimate. In addition a costume based on him for the Mii Brawler appears as downloadable content.

=== In other media ===
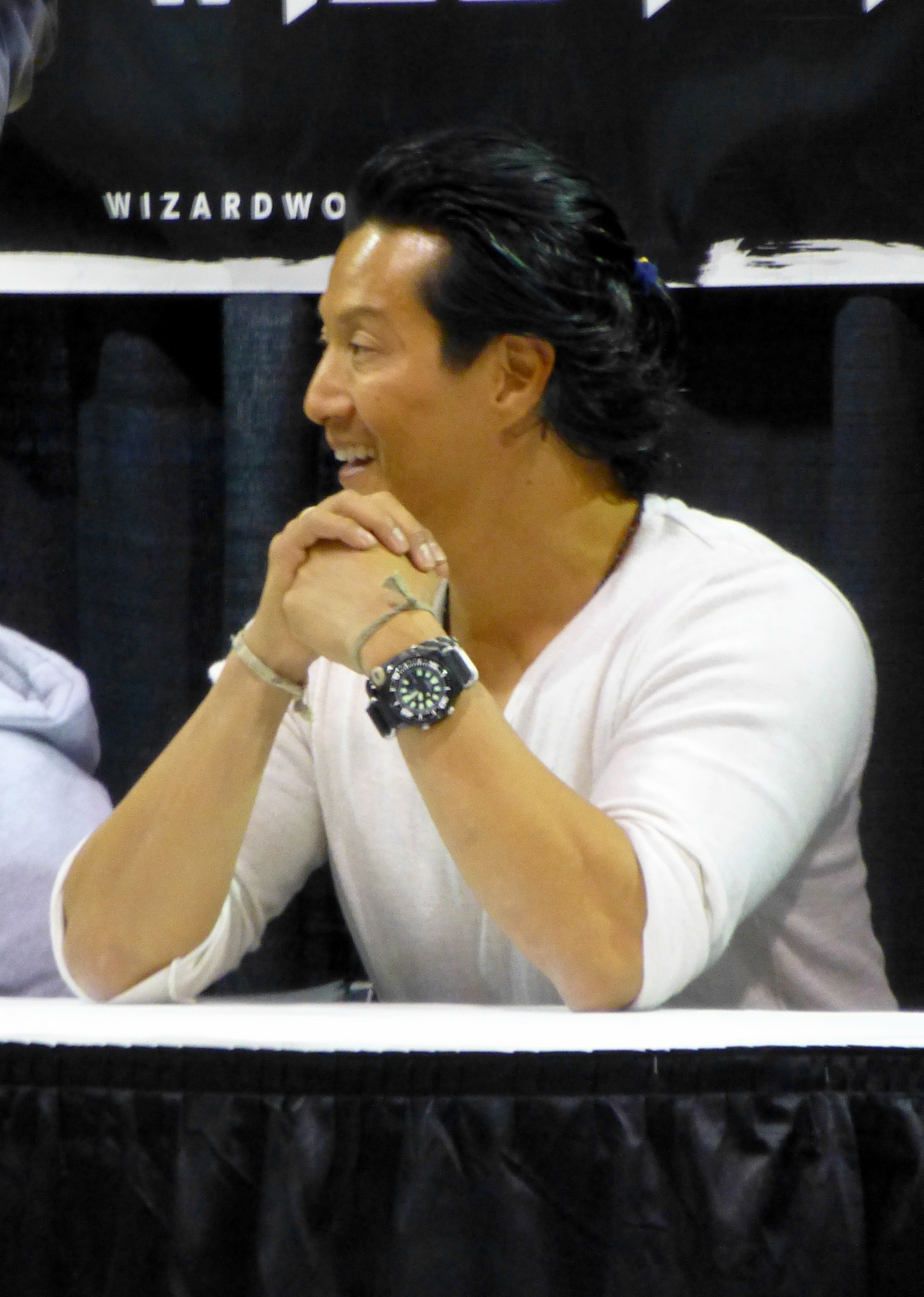
Will Yun Lee portrayed Iori in The King of Fighters live-action movie.

Aside from the King of Fighters series, the character is featured in an audio drama and a character image album. In the anime The King of Fighters: Another Day, Iori searches for Ash to regain his powers. Iori appears in the spin-off manga story entitled The King of Fighters: Kyo, which is based on his adventure prior to The King of Fighters '96. Ryo Takamisaki's manga The King of Fighters G shows an alternative retelling of KOF '96 in which Iori faces Kyo and Athena Asamiya. The character appears in a manhua adaptation of The King of Fighters: Zillion created by Andy Seto that retells Iori's story of his fight against Orochi until he attacks NESTS to destroy Kyo's clones. He also stars in other manhua for the games, starting with The King of Fighters 2001 and ending with 2003 along with the Maximum Impact series. In the manga The King of Fighters: A New Beginning, Vice and Mature force the Orochi power to make Iori lose his mind during his battle with Kyo. The battle ends in a draw with Iori's team losing due to the other fighters' rounds.

Iori is played by Will Yun Lee in the film The King of Fighters. In the CGI series The King of Fighters: Destiny Iori makes a brief appearance in the first season's finale, in which he tries to play music but starts going berserk. He is one of two protagonists alongside Kyo in online gag manga Part Time Stories: Kyo & Iori by Falcoon; the two title characters work together to promote SNK's merchandising. He is also featured in the manga The King of Fighters: A New Beginning. Iori is also present in novels based on the series. He is also set to be the protagonist of the light novel series Iori Yagami's Isekai Mu'sou by Nobuhiko Tenkawa which depicts him in an alternate universe fighting goblins.

== Reception ==
=== Critical response ===
The character Iori Yagami was mostly well received by several video game publications and other media. Sohu commented Kyo Kusanagi is more suitable to be the heir of the blood of the Orochi, Iori Yagami overshadows him due to his origins. Kyo and Iori's introduction was highly popular to the point Japanese gamers spread rumors they might be brother due to their connection to the myth of Orochi though Chinese comic created bizarre plots involving them. Despite the comics portraying Kyo and Iori's deadly enemies, the video game introductions did not go that far and instead used to tease their continuous competitiveness highly lampshaded by how they stare at each other while creating different colored flames. Therefore, Iori Yagami and Kyo Kusanagi still get along very harmoniously in occasions that do not involve "Orochi" but still have misrelationship. Shivam Bhatt on Retronauts's said that fighting games were often going to have the "beautiful man" type of character and Iori's design evokes this trope being also compared with Street Fighter III's Remy. When it came to Chinese comics, Gamer TW said Kyo was not a popular character until Iori was introduced and their rivalry was portrayed in a complex way. The formation of the Three Sacred Treasures Team in The King of Fighters '96 had a major impact with fans because it was appealing because of the Orochi saga and because of its incorporation of Japanese mythology. According to Atomix, the berserker Iori is nicknamed "Crazy Iori" in Mexico where the franchise is highly popular. Meanwhile, the Japanese have a tendency to call him "Buso Iori". Den of Geek praised Iori's Orochi form for being far more violent than his already deadly persona.

Retronaut claimed that Kyo and Iori being removed from The King of Fighters '99 was shocking upon release saying it would be the same as if the iconic Ryu and Ken Masters were removed from Street Fighter which led to their eventual return as hidden due to negative feedback. The same writer said the duo felt like Dragon Ball Z characters due to how overpowered they were in the first The King of Fighters '99 comic to the point of overshadowing K', resulting in the writer giving them a smaller screentime in the sequel where they are only involved in a personal fight between each other. For the final installment of the NESTS arc, The King of Fighters 2001, MeriStation appreciated the two rivals were given a team as SNK kept them as single character in previous games., while Conexión Manga enjoyed his heroic characterization when fighting Igniz to end NESTS and save all of their experiments in the process.

Den of Geek noted that while Iori started as "anti-hero" due to his tendency to beat up his own teammates in his first two games, he would join forces Kyo for a greater good in upcoming titles which changed the way he was seen. However, the fact that Iori is defeated by Ash in KOF XI was noted to be the opposite due to how much it affected him to the point of creating a new fighting style that does not involve flames. The character's new design from The King of Fighters XII has been well received by GameSpot's writer Andrew Park who found such moves interesting. Todd Ciolek from Anime News Network found Iori's appearance in KOF XIV dated. In response to the negative feedback involving the design, artist Hiroaki Hashimoto said that while Kyo's and Iori's original designs in the Orochi arc were so appealing, it was hard for SNK to keep coming up with quality with XIV. Den of Geek praised his moves, rivalry with Kyo as well as apparent character arc based on how he retakes his lost powers in KOF XIII and used them in KOF XIV to once again seal Orochi.

Across the franchise, Iori has been given new looks and techniques which have also resulted in different kind of responses. 1UP.com writer Richard Li; Li complained about the lack of Iori's signature moves such as his fireballs, and while some of them remained, Li noted that they now require a different input from the ones they normally require. Meanwhile, Iori's return to his classic techniques in KOF XIV mainly using flames were celebrated by Hobby Consolas because of their popularity with fans. Atinux agreed, calling the character "sadistic" because of the violence of his attacks, most notably seen in his strongest moves that reference his enhanced Orochi form from previous games.

Journalists have also commented on Iori's appearances outside the KOF games. Iori's crossdressing persona Miss X has been popular; SNK stated they received multiple requests to add him into the crossover game SNK Heroines: Tag Team Frenzy, an upcoming fighting game focused on female characters. Destructoid stated he was shocked by Miss X's debut in SNK Heroines: Tag Team Frenzy because of Iori's obvious secret identity and because she has different incarnations with a different gender and outfit. Atomix shared similar feelings but refrained from revealing the character's true identity. Universo Nintendo originally thought the DLC character would be an alternative version of Ash Crimson and was surprised by the revelation. The website said Miss X's second form is possibly the most humiliating version because the character is wearing a t-shirt of his rival Kyo. Nevertheless, the character's movements were thought to be similar to those of the original Iori and thus long-time gamers would easily play as Miss X.

=== Popularity ===
Merchandising based on Iori, including figurines, key-chains and puzzles, has been released. Two scale figures based on Iori's original form and his XIV look have also been released. A replica of his KOF XIV coat was produced for merchandising. Manga author Ami Shibata expressed having taken a liking to Iori Yagami when playing The King of Fighters '95 during his youth, often doing illustrations of Iori to be sent to Gamest magazine until its inclusion much to his surprise. In the book Gaming Cultures and Place in Asia-Pacific, Iori was regarded as one of the most popular video game characters in Hong Kong from the mid 1990s onward alongside Kyo, Mai and others, to the point of overshadowing the Street Fighter characters, which were also well-known.

To choose the cover for the Xbox 360 and PlayStation 3 ports of KOF XII, Ignition Entertainment started a survey on May 4, 2009, in which users of their forum could vote for one of two covers they wanted to see in the game. While both covers feature multiple characters, one uses Kyo in the center and the other Iori. When the two surveys ended, Ignition started two new ones that asked people to vote between the previous winners and the Japanese covers from the game for both consoles. In late 2018, Iori and other SNK characters appeared as part of collaborations with other companies in Harajuku, Japan, involving new merchandising. Iori's image was made by Falcoon. Game designer Masahiro Sakurai was amazed when first seeing Iori in The King of Fighters '95 due to his attitude and moves which made him praise the designers. In November 2024, Tanita made an official collaboration with SNK which involved merchandising and studying the bodies of Iori among other characters from the series.
