= The King of Fighters 2003 =

2003 video game

- Arcade flyer featuring Duo Lon, Shen Woo, and Ash Crimson
- Developer: SNK Playmore
- Publishers: SNK Playmore: Arcade; KOR: Mega Enterprise PlayStation 2; JP/NA: SNK Playmore; PAL: Ignition Entertainment
- Producers: Eikichi Kawasaki; Kazuya Hirata
- Designer: T. Mieno
- Artist: Tatsuhiko Kanaoka
- Composers: Masahiko Hataya; Yasumasa Yamada; Yasuo Yamate
- Series: The King of Fighters
- Platform: Arcade: Neo Geo AES, PlayStation 2, Xbox
- Release: December 12, 2003: Arcade; JP: December 12, 2003 Neo Geo AES; JP: March 18, 2004 PlayStation 2; JP: October 28, 2004; NA: February 8, 2005; EU: April 2006; AU: January 16, 2007 Xbox; JP: August 25, 2005; NA: August 31, 2005
- Genre: Fighting
- Modes: Single-player, multiplayer
- Arcade system: Neo Geo MVS

The King of Fighters 2003 (Note: Japanese: ザ・キング・オブ・ファイターズ 2003, Hepburn: Za Kingu Obu Faitāzu 2003) (KOF 2003, or KOF '03) is a 2003 fighting video game developed and published by SNK Playmore for the Neo Geo arcade and home platforms. It is the tenth game in The King of Fighters series, and the last entry released for the Neo Geo, which had served as the primary platform for the series since The King of Fighters '94. It was ported to the PlayStation 2 and Xbox, (Note: in North America and Japan only, it was not compatible with the Xbox 360) and was released on both consoles in North America in a two-in-one bundle with the preceding game in the series, The King of Fighters 2002. Character designs and artwork were handled by artist Falcoon.

The game uses a 3-versus-3 "tag battle" format that allows players to change characters in the middle of a fight, which was designed to make the game more accessible than previous installments. Each team has one leader with access to a "leader super special move". The story follows a tournament being held by "R" with two parallel bosses serving as final bosses. The game introduces the story arc of newcomer Ash Crimson, titled "Tales of Ash." It differs from previous story arcs by featuring an ambiguous protagonist who is an apparent villain with a new organization seeking the power of the demon Yamata no Orochi.

The King of Fighters 2003 received mixed reviews, with critics divided on its story, graphics, and new gameplay features. However, the speed of the gameplay was seen as a major improvement. It was followed by the spinoff KOF: Maximum Impact (2004) and the sequel The King of Fighters XI (2005), which continued the series' three story arc. The game was ported to the Nintendo Switch, PlayStation 4, and Xbox One in 2019, and to Windows in 2022.

== Gameplay ==
Example of Ash (left) fighting Iori (right). The top bars indicate the health while the bottom ones indicate the energy need to perform Desperation Moves or Leader Moves.

Gameplay in The King of Fighters 2003 is similar to previous games in the series. The player's power gauge can hold up to 3 stocks at the beginning of a match. Unlike KOF 2002, however, the player starts with a full gauge of three stocks. When a team loses one of its members, the maximum capacity of their power gauge stocks is increased by one, giving the losing team a handicap against the opposing team. In contrast to previous games, the arcade version has two potential final boss fights. The Kusanagi boss fight serves to decide which bosses the player will face in the final fight.

The King of Fighters 2003 uses teams composed of three members in a multi-shift format, allowing players to change characters in the middle of a fight, similar to SNK's Kizuna Encounter: Super Tag Battle (1996). When "Change OK" is displayed above the power gauge, the player can do a "quick shift" and change characters immediately, or alternatively, perform a "switch-off attack" against the opponent that will consume one power gauge stock.

The game also features a "tactical leader system," in which one member of the team is designated as the leader. The chosen leader has access to an exclusive move known as the "leader super special move" (in addition to the regular "super special moves"). However, the leader move usually requires two power gauge stocks to be able to perform it.

=== Characters ===
The game has a total of 36 playable characters. Each of which can be selected in a specific combination to form twelve themed teams of three. Most of the roster are returning characters from prior KOF titles, however some are new characters to the series. These newcomers include the revamped "Hero Team" consisting of Ash Crimson, Shen Woo, and Duo Lon, as well as Malin of the "High School Girls Team". Additionally, the characters Tizoc and Gato, as well as the design and moveset of Terry Bogard, from Garou: Mark of the Wolves (1999) are introduced. Returning characters involve Joe Higashi from the Fatal Fury Team, the Art of Fighting Team composed of Ryo Sakazaki, Robert Garcia and Yuri Sakazaki, the Korea Team composed of Kim Kaphwan, Chang Koehan and Jhun Hoon, the Ikari Team has Leona Heidern, Ralf Jones and Clark Still. The Outlaw Team features the returning Billy Kane and Ryuji Yamazaki. The Women Fighters Team focuses on King, Mai Shiranui and Blue Mary, all returning. The Benimaru Team also has returning trio of Benimaru Nikaido, Shingo Yabuki and Goro Daimon. The Highs School Girls Team has the returning Athena Asamiya, Hinako Shijou while the K' Team is composed of the returnings K', Maxima and Whip. The narrative changes depending on the player's actions against the mid-game boss, Kusanagi, a clone of the returning veteran Kyo Kusanagi. Meanwhile, Kyo remains as a single entry in the original version alongside his rival Iori Yagami unless Chizuru Kagura is unlocked as part of the "Sacred Treasures Team." The bosses are the martial artist Adelheid and the demon Mukai.

== Synopsis ==
Two years after the events of The King of Fighters 2001, a new KOF tournament is announced. It is sponsored by an unknown patron whose identity becomes a matter of public interest. During the canon ending, it is revealed that Kusanagi was created by Chizuru's sacred mirror as an attempt to test the winner. Chizuru and her undead sister, Maki Kagura, challenge the player as a boss duo. Once the Kagura sisters are defeated, a woman named Botan reveals herself as the one who had brainwashed Chizuru. Both Botan and her partner Mukai are revealed as the true masterminds behind the tournament, with the latter serving as the true final boss. Despite being defeated, Mukai claims success for his unknown superior, having weakened the seal of the ancient demon Orochi, the will of Gaia, in the final fight. If the player has the "Sacred Treasures Team", a new ending will be revealed once Mukai has fought Kyo, Iori and Chizuru. Ash ambushes the weakened Chizuru', stealing her sacred mirror. Ash taunts Iori and escapes, leading Kyo to swear revenge against Ash and Mukai's group.

An alternate ending following Kusanagi's defeat has the player facing off against a young brother and sister duo named Adelheid and Rose Bernstein. They are the children of Rugal Bernstein, the antagonist from The King of Fighters '94. Once Adelheid is defeated, Rose threatens the winner, only to be stopped by Adelheid, who tells her to let them go as they won fairly.

== Development ==
The King of Fighters 2003 was first revealed at the Tokyo Game Show in 2003. It was originally planned to be developed on the Atomiswave hardware before moving to the Neo Geo MVS. According to Akito Kadowaki, section manager of RC Business Promotion at SNK Playmore, the new multi-shift system was created to replace the "Striker" assist system from the "NESTS Chronicles". (Note: the story arc that followed the NESTS organization in The King of Fighters '99, The King of Fighters 2000, and The King of Fighters 2001) In previous entries, the characters' battle order could affect the final outcome. The player must decide when to bring out the leader of their team. In previous games, all the characters performed similarly; in 2003, only one leader is able to perform a powerful technique. The player must choose whether to use the leader's move at the beginning of the fight or as an advantage later in the fight. SNK observed that newer fighting games had begun to feature more complex inputs targeting experienced players, and believed that a high difficulty level would be a detriment to 2003. In response, the game was made with the intention of being easy to play. Since switching characters too frequently could confuse the player, a set timer was introduced to limit switching between team members.

The King of Fighters 2003 was artist Falcoon's debut in the main King of Fighters series, though he had experience with spin-offs and the crossover SNK vs. Capcom: SVC Chaos. He also worked on the enemy AI for the franchise. Falcoon aimed for a balanced roster of both men and women for fans to enjoy.

Ash Crimson was designed as an "attractive evil character", in contrast to previous King of Fighters heroes. Due to Ash's appearance in The King of Fighters 2003, the staff joked that teammate Shen Woo seemed more like the series' main character than Ash did. Writer Akihiko Ureshino stated that Ash has the weakest relationships among protagonists but that it would develop in later games, and Nona, the artist in charge of the new protagonist, said he liked Ash and looked forward to his development.

The development team encountered no major problems with the two boss characters, Adelheid and Mukai, during their design processes. Adelheid was added in an attempt to appeal to a wider audience and to add additional depth to the narrative of the series. During the Adelheid stage of the game, Chopin's Revolutionary Etude plays. The system limitations of the Neo Geo hardware meant that the inclusion of the song required the removal of dialogue from other characters. The developers joked that "we believe it was worth it, but we may have dissed the supervising designers of other characters in the process." While the mid-boss Kusanagi was first introduced in The King of Fighters 2002 without a plot focused around him, The King of Fighters 2003 introduced his clone that was created by Chizuru Kagura. The developers also intended to include his original school uniform, which was highly popular with Kyo's fans. The King of Fighters 2003 also features Fatal Fury guest Terry Bogard with his redesign from Garou: Mark of the Wolves (1999), including new moves introduced in that title. Another Garou character, Tizoc, was chosen for inclusion in 2003 over Fatal Fury grappler Raiden; while several designers also considered the idea of including the sub-boss Grant, the idea was later scrapped. Gato was also added from Fatal Fury to appeal to Chinese players. Among original characters, Choi Bounge's absence saw the need for a replacement for Athena Asamiya's team. Malin, who had little marketing when promoting the game, was created for the role.

=== Release and related media ===
The arcade game was originally released on December 12, 2003, with ports for the Neo Geo, PlayStation 2, and Xbox releasing on March 18, 2004, October 28, 2004, and August 25, 2005, respectively. In North America, the game was released alongside The King of Fighters 2002 for the PlayStation 2 and Xbox on September 8, 2006. The game was released for Nintendo Switch on February 21, 2019 and for the PlayStation 4 on December 8, 2020. The game was released for Windows through Amazon Games, and in 2024, it launched on GOG.com.

The series inspired a manhua of the same name. In China, the series was divided into two halves: The King of Fighters 2003 composed five issues, and The King of Fighters 03: Xenon Zero (拳皇 XENON ZERO) composed eight issues. The two series were combined for the North American release under the name of The King of Fighters 2003. In July 2004, ComicsOne licensed the series, with the first volume releasing alongside a new video game and continued publication after the transition to DrMaster.

== Reception and legacy ==
Reception

Review scores
Publication	Score		
Publication	Neo Geo	PS2	Xbox
Maniac	N/A	82/100	83/100
Eurogamer	N/A	5/10	5/10
MeriStation	N/A	6/10	N/A
Jeuxactu	17/20	N/A	N/A
Defunctgames	B+	N/A	N/A

Award
Publication	Award
Monthly Arcadia	5th Arcadia Grand Prize, Best Character Award (Ash Crimson)

In Japan, the game sold 16,620 copies in 2004 for the PlayStation 2.

Critical response to The King of Fighters 2003 was mixed. Hardcore Gaming 101 believed the new gameplay features, cast, and artwork were interesting, but the sequel, XI, fixed most of the issues present in 2003. GameSpot found the game to be an improvement over its predecessor, 2002, thanks to more responsive controls and better online gameplay. However, they felt that 2002 was more enjoyable, writing that 2003 was still experimenting with the tag system and had fewer characters. GameZone agreed, criticizing the amount of playable characters but praising the fast-paced team system that made combat more enjoyable. They criticized SNK's lack of commitment to improving the visuals for several games, still retaining the same quality as the original arcade version. IGN favorably compared the fighting system to Capcom's Marvel vs. Capcom 2 but lamented how the PlayStation 2 port lacked an online mode. They still found it superior to the "NESTS Chronicles" as well as The King of Fighters 2002. Maniac praised the new gameplay system and online mode, but found the single-player content limited when compared with Street Fighter Alpha 3.

Some writers focused on the cast and story. MeriStation criticized how the alternate endings come across as frustrating because they do not develop the characters equally. The ending involving Mukai was praised for its presentation and more elaborate story. They also praised the changes to character movesets like Robert Garcia, K', and Ralf Jones after multiple installments with the same style. Destructoid enjoyed the gameplay, as it was the fastest KOF game up to that point, and praised the variation of playable characters, such as the new protagonist Ash Crimson. Eurogamer reviewed the game negatively, believing previous SNK fighting games such as The King of Fighters 2002 offered a better cast and that the new gameplay system would confuse newcomers. Nevertheless, the reviewer commented that the new Garou: Mark of the Wolves fighters introduced in 2003 would also appeal to SNK fans. The inclusion of Tizoc, a professional Mexican wrestler, was noted by Kotaku for appealing to Latin American fans. Maniac particularly enjoyed the decision to include characters from Garou: Mark of the Wolves. The character of Ash was divisive due to his highly antagonistic portrayal, especially when he attacks Chizuru, despite being the third KOF protagonist. Meanwhile, Polygon said SNK was still direct with marketing the new story arc using Ash's image, replacing previous lead K'. Gametype had mixed thoughts about the new characters, seeing Adelheid as too androgynous for being Rugal's apparent child and compared Hinako to Bridget from Guilty Gear. When it came to the plot, the writer looked forward to the further exploration of the Japanese myths theme the story touches, expressing disappointment of the previous NESTS story arc previously in the series. Nevertheless, he still praised the redesigns of Kyo among other returning character to fit with the narrative.

The King of Fighters 2003 was the last Neo Geo game released alongside Samurai Shodown V Special (2004). SNK cancelled production of The King of Fighters 2004 in the fall of 2004. After the cancellation was announced, SNK signed an agreement with Sammy Corporation to use their Atomiswave system instead of the Neo Geo cabinets that had been used by the franchise previously. The King of Fighters XI's arcade version used the new Atomiswave system. KOF: Maximum Impact and its sequels were written to expand on Ash's character and his rivalry with returning characters.
