= Akihiko Ureshino =

Japanese novelist

Akihiko Ureshino (Japanese: 嬉野 秋彦, Hepburn: Ureshino Akihiko) is a light novel author and game designer, born April 19, 1971, in the Tochigi Prefecture, Japan. He wrote his first novel while he was attending Yokohama National University for a degree in Liberal Arts. He is known to Japanese SNK fans for his game novelizations of The King of Fighters series and other games. He also partakes in the story development for the series, and is the one who usually writes the online novels found on the games' websites. Akihiko Ureshino's other works include The Black Steel Demon Crest Repairer, She is a War Fairy, and Mephisto's Magic Bullet.

== Works and commentary ==
Ureshino is known for writing several The King of Fighters works based on SNK games he also oversees. After working in 10 KOF novelizations, Ureshino noted that SNK used leads Kyo Kusanagi and Iori Yagami too much and believed they should be given a rest after The King of Fighters '97. Ureshino has mixed feelings with the two Game Boy Advance The King of Fighters spin-off EX. While he was still excited, when the main visual of the new character was presented to him, which was no longer even a rough draft, but was already solid. What was more, when reading the specs, Iori Yagami was the mid-boss and Geese Howard was the final boss. During the early stages of development for The King of Fighters '99, SNK planned to exclude Kyo and Iori from the game because its story was centered on new protagonist K', but they reversed this decision because "they couldn't leave these popular characters in limbo". The rival's relationship stood out early in the 1990s because it was weird to see characters interacting before a fight started. While Kyo and Iori are always arguing with each other, Ureshino was careful with how writing them to the point their introduction in The King of Fighters '99 added a subtext of happiness of the two rivals meeting again, believing they had died in KOF '97. The relationship develops over later games until the latest KOF XV from 2022 where Ureshino noted fighting Kyo was Iori's only desire in life and always wanted to join him to prevent his death. For The King of Fighters 2002 Unlimited Match, Ureshino created the character Nameless whose designed was made by artist Hiroaki Hashimoto.

The problem is the positioning of these two within the KOF: Maximum Impact series. Ureshino noted that while Kyo was relegated to a more comical and minor role in the first game, the Meira siblings did not stand out as strong protagonists and wanted the original net animation Another Day and Maximum Impact 2 give them a better portrayal. SNK said that Terry's great popularity among players made him one of the most used characters for every installment of the series. In the "Ash Saga" Kyo, Iori, and Chizuru's Three Sacred Treasures play a major role in the "Orochi demon Returns" type story, and in the previous "Nests Saga," Kyo was involved in the story to some extent, but not Iori, in terms of the connections with the new protagonist K'. However, the Miera brothers were the main focus of the Maximum Impact spin-offs relegating Kyo and Iori for the first time to minor characters. Both the Ash arc and Maximum Impact games were developed at the same time which resulted in Kyo and Iori still playing a major role in the Another Day original video animation that promotes Maximum Impact 2. In an interview, Ureshino stated that after he wrote The King of Fighters '96 until 2001 light novels, he was asked by a production company to write a novel on The King of Fighters 2003. However, the project ended due to a loss of communication with him.

Ureshino is also involved in the Fatal Fury characters which he also oversees in The King of Fighters. He oversees a similar relationship in rivals but more brutal between hero Terry Bogard who seeks to avenge his father Jeff murderered at the hands of Geese Howard. However, for upcoming installments, Terry only wishes to defeat Geese for his father's honor which accidentally leads to Geese's death in Real Bout Fatal Fury when Geese rejects salvation and dies, abandoning all connections he had and wanted to dissolve. Ureshino laments not being able to write his own Fatal Fury novels as SNK had been restricting Garou novelizations was that they had already teamed up with Kodansha and were planning to develop an official story called Garou Densetsu Seiden on a large scale, whether as a comic or a novel. Ureshino thinsk that was probably why he had approached Gamest Z Bunko prior to this about a novelization of Fatal Fury 3 and been turned down.

== List of works ==
As cited in:

=== Hakuei Series ===
- The White Tiger Cries in the Bright Moon ISBN 4-08-613150-1 July 1994
- The Morning of Sorrow Fills the Heavens and Earth ISBN 4-08-613163-3 December 1994
- Autumn Leaves: Hakuei Dances in the High Tower ISBN 4-08-613173-0 April 1995

==== The Time the Demon Star Twinkles: The Tale of the Fire-Rin Child ====
- The Time the Demon Star Twinkles: The Tale of the Fire-Rin Child ISBN 4-08-613181-1 July 1995

==== The Red Dragon Resurrects in the Afternoon ====
- The Red Dragon Resurrects in the Afternoon ISBN 4-08-613201-X December 1995

==== Fox's Chronicle: Two in the Moonlight ====
- Fox's Chronicle: Two in the Moonlight ISBN 4-08-613212-5 March 1996

==== Armageddon Busters ====
- Golden Rhapsody! ISBN 4-08-613318-0 September 1998
- Beautiful Beasts of the Moonlight ISBN 4-08-613334-2 January 1999
- Red Fountain of Wisdom ISBN 4-08-613345-8 April 1999
- The People of the Sahara Family ISBN 4-08-613355-5 July 1999
- Feast of the Magicians ISBN 4-08-613365-2 October 1999
- Lady Ghost ISBN 4-08-613377-6 February 2000
- Bloody Dog ISBN 4-08-613389-X August 2000

=== Shueisha Cobalt Bunko ===
==== Fairy Knight ====
- Fairy Knight ISBN 4-08-614278-3 January 1997
- Fairy Knight 2: Two Black Knights ISBN 4-08-614334-8 June 1997
- Fairy Knight 3: Swordsman of the Dawn ISBN 4-08-614405-0 December 1997
- Fairy Knight 4: Prince of the Dark Seat ISBN 4-08-614429-8 February 1998

==== Shining Wizard ====
- Chilling Blood ISBN 4-08-600273-6 June 2003
- Angel Knocks on the Door ISBN 4-08-600316-3 September 2003
- Emerald Wizard ISBN 4-08-600377-5 February 2004
- Snake and Boy ISBN 4-08-600478-X September 2004
- My Devil ISBN 4-08-600564-6 March 2005
  - Awakening Space ISBN 4-08-600661-8 October 2005
  - Armageddon Buster! ISBN 4-08-600726-6 February 2006

=== Shueisha Super Dash Bunko ===
==== Fairyland Chronicle ====
- Silver Sword ISBN 4-08-630003-6 July 2000
- Woman Who Doesn't Cry ISBN 4-08-630016-8 November 2000
- The Forest He Doesn't Know ISBN 4-08-630027-3 March 2001
- Demon Eyes ISBN 4-08-630047-8 August 2001
- The Power of a Mother ISBN 4-08-630063-X November 2001

==== Augoeides ====
- Myth Awakening ISBN 4-08-630077-X April 2002
- Dream City ISBN 4-08-630095-8 August 2002
- The Advent of the Evil God ISBN 4-08-630128-8 May 2003

==== The Rando Family ====
- The Rando Family ISBN 4-08-630174-1 November 2003
- The Rando Family One More Kiss ISBN 4-08-630174-1 March 2004
- The Rando Family Kiss From Heaven ISBN 4-08-630187-3 June 2004
- The Rando Family Sweet Little Pain ISBN 4-08-630212-8 November 2004
- Randou Family Bittersweet Rain ISBN 4-08-630225-X February 2005
- Randou Family Sweet Home Again ISBN 4-08-630242-X June 2005
- Randou Family Goddess of Darkness ISBN 4-08-630266-7 November 2005
- Randou Family Goddess of Innocence ISBN 4-08-630298-5 May 2006
- Randou Family Goddess of Earth ISBN 4-08-630320-5 October 2006

==== Zelandine ====
- The Naughty Rose Princess ISBN 978-4-08-630360-6 May 2007

=== Chitty Chitty Beautiful Immortal Legend! (Chitty Chitty Series) ===
- The Lost Thunder Whip ISBN 4-04-417801-1 July 1996
- The Witch of the Two Thousand Years ISBN 4-04-417802-X October 1996
- Risking Your Life Even on the Sea! ISBN 4-04-417803-8 December 1996
- The Silver Star-Eyed Demon - Yin - ISBN 4-04-417806-2 September 1997
- The Silver Star-Eyed Demon - Yang - ISBN 4-04-417808-9 February 1998
- Chitty Chitty Seasonal Almanac ISBN 4-04-417809-7 July 1998
- Emperor Waltz ISBN 4-04-417810-0 November 1998

==== Leon's Journey to the East ====
- The Naive and the Bandits ISBN 4-04-417804-6 March 1997
- The Sheltered Maid and the Fake Knights ISBN 4-04-417805-4 August 1997
- The Lying Saint and the Dark Cult ISBN 4-04-417807-0 December 1997

==== Divine Curse Slaughter ====
- Volume 1: Kyokotsuka ISBN 4-04-417811-9 September 1999
- Volume 2 Gaihoin ISBN 4-04-417812-7 December 1999
- Volume 3 Tenmagoya ISBN 4-04-417813-5 March 2000

==== Primal Striker ====
- Invaders from the Manhole! ISBN 4-04-417814-3 October 2000
- Secret Transfer Student ISBN 4-04-417815-1 February 2001

=== Kadokawa Sneaker Books ===
==== Grudge ====
- Grudge ISBN 4-04-788714-5 March 1999

=== Famitsu Bunko ===
==== Horus Master ====
- Silver Star Butterfly of the Desert ISBN 4-7572-0123-0 August 1998 (ISBN 4-7577-1113-1 December 2002)
- Smile of the White Demon ISBN 4-7572-0237-7 December 1998 (ISBN 4-7577-1116-6 December 2002)
- Conditions of Genius ISBN 4-7572-0368-3 April 1999 (ISBN 4-7577-1123-9 December 2002)
- Poem of Awakening ISBN 4-7572-0473-6 August 1999 (ISBN 4-7577-1125-5 December 2002)
- Thunderous Swordswoman ISBN 4-7572-0504-X September 1999 (ISBN 4-7577-1126-3 December 2002)
- Wind of Remembrance ISBN 4-7572-0654-2 February 2000 (ISBN 4-7577-1132-8 December 2002)
- Island of Silence and Silence ISBN 4-7572-0686-0 March 2000 (ISBN 4-7577-1135-2 December 2002)
- Feast of the Hollow Gods ISBN 4-7577-0134-9 July 2000
- Wings of the False God ISBN 4-7577-0227-2 November 2000
- Whisper of the White Mage ISBN 4-7577-0365-1 March 2001
- Girl of the Black Tower ISBN 4-7577-0499-2 July 2001
- Twilight of the Sword Kings ISBN 4-7577-0658-8 November 2001
- Garden of Viciousness ISBN 4-7577-0900-5 July 2002
- Demonic Sword of Destruction ISBN 4-7577-1478-5 July 2003
- Battlefield of Crimson Snow ISBN 4-7577-1509-9 July 2003
- Song of the Beginning ISBN 4-7577-1545-5 September 2003
- Volumes 1 to 7 are published by ASCII There are two versions: the (corporate) ASCII version and the Enterbrain version. The latter is a reprint.

==== Astronomicon ====
- Amazon Red ISBN 4-7577-0258-2 December 2000
- Phantom Blue ISBN 4-7577-0468-2 July 2001
- Eternity Green ISBN 4-7577-0572-7 October 2001

==== Chitty Chitty's World Reppuden!! (Chitty Chitty Series) ====
- Shotgun Marriage ISBN 4-7577-0833-5 May 2002
- Beast Howling ISBN 4-7577-0958-7 September 2002
- Foxy Step ISBN 4-7577-1241-3 February 2003
- Cutie Lips ISBN 4-7577-1359-2 April 2003
- Robotnik War ISBN 4-7577-1632-X December 2003
- Dark Star Rising ISBN 4-7577-1834-9 April 2004
- Jade Breaker ISBN 4-7577-1996-5 September 2004

==== Kureya-kun's Strange Days ====
- Speed of Love ISBN 4-7577-1968-X September 2004
- Back in Love ISBN 4-7577-2170-6 March 2005
- Future in Love ISBN 4-7577-2391-1 October 2005

==== The tiger leaps, the dragon smiles ====
- Lion King Conquest! ISBN 978-4-7577-3508-8 May 2007
- Golden Full Moon ISBN 978-4-7577-3684-9 September 2007
- Ode to the Setting Sun, Poem of the Morning Star ISBN 978-4-7577-3916-1 January 2008

=== She is a War Fairy ===
- She is Warlike 1 ISBN 978-4-7577-4406-6 August 2008
- She is Warlike2 ISBN 978-4-7577-4580-3 December 2008
- She is warlike 3 ISBN 978-4-7577-4889-7 May 2009
- She is warlike 4 ISBN 978-4-7577-5043-2 August 2009
- She is warlike Little Poem 1 ISBN 978-4-04-726141-9 November 2009
- She is warlike 5 ISBN 978-4-04-726399-4 March 2010
- She is warlike Little Poem 2 ISBN 978-4-04-726539-4 May 2010
- She is warlike 6 ISBN 978-4-04-726759-6 August 2010
- She is warlike 7 ISBN 978-4-04-726964-4 December 2010
- She is warlike Little Psalm 3 ISBN 978-4-04-727076-3 February 2011

=== The King of Fighters novelizations ===
- The King of Fighters '96 ~Rumbling on the city~ ISBN 4-89366-608-8 November 1996
- The King of Fighters '97 Volume 1 ~At the End of an Endless Summer~ ISBN 4-89366-862-5 November 1997
- The King of Fighters '97 Volume 2 ~The Two of Us After 660 Years~ ISBN 4-89366-888-9 December 1997
- The King of Fighters '98 ~Those Who Remain~ ISBN 4-7572-0173-7 October 1998
- The King of Fighters '98 ~The Greatest Happiness for the Greatest Number~ ISBN 4-7572-0203-2 November 1998
- The King of Fighters '99 ~BEYOND THE "K"~ ISBN 4-7572-0597-X December 1999
- The King of Fighters 2000 ~ICICLE DOLL~ ISBN 4-7577-0279-5 January 2001
- The King of Fighters 2000 ~STRIKERS STRIKE BACK~ ISBN 4-7577-0348-1 March 2001
- The King of Fighters 2001 Part 1 ~MORE THAN HUMAN~ ISBN 4-7577-0753-3 March 2002
- The King of Fighters 2001 Part 2 ~THE GODS THEMSELVES~ ISBN 4-7577-0754-1 March 2002
