= Kong Kuwata =

Japanese television actor, radio announcer and singer

- コング 桑田
- Born: Takanobu Kuwata; August 23, 1961 (age 65); Sakai, Osaka, Japan
- Occupations: Actor, voice actor, radio announcer, singer

Kong Kuwata (コング 桑田, Kongu Kuwata; born Takanobu Kuwata (桑田敬信, Kuwata Takanobu), August 23, 1961 in Sakai, Osaka) is a Japanese voice actor, television and theatrical actor, radio announcer and gospel singer. He is an active member of the theatrical group, Lilly Boat Army 2 and the Cube Group talent agency. He is best known for his roles as Geese Howard from the Fatal Fury series and Genjuro Kibagami from the Samurai Shodown series.

== Roles ==
=== Anime ===
- Samurai Spirits 2: Asura-Zanmaden (1999) - Genjuro Kibagami
- Samurai 7 (2004) – Kikuchiyo
- Ginga Legend Weed (2006) – Kaibutsu
- Appleseed Ex Machina (2007) – Aeacus
- Akaneiro ni Somaru Saka (2008) - Nagase (Father)
- The King of Fighters: Destiny (2017) – Geese Howard

=== Video games ===
- Fatal Fury: King of Fighters (1991) – Duck King, Richard Meyer, Tung Fu Rue, Micheal Max, Hwa Jai, Raiden, Billy Kane, Geese Howard
- Samurai Shodown II (1994) – Genjuro Kibagami, Neinhalt Sieger
- Fatal Fury 3: Road to the Final Victory (1995) – Geese Howard
- Samurai Shodown III (1995) – Genjuro Kibagami
- Real Bout Fatal Fury (1995) – Duck King, Geese Howard
- The King of Fighters '96 (1996) – Geese Howard
- Samurai Shodown IV (1996) – Genjuro Kibagami
- Real Bout Fatal Fury Special (1997) – Duck King, Geese Howard
- Samurai Shodown 64 (1997) – Genjuro Kibagami
- Real Bout Fatal Fury 2: The Newcomers (1998) – Duck King, Geese Howard
- The King of Fighters: Kyo (1998) – Geese Howard
- Fatal Fury: Wild Ambition (1999) – Duck King, Geese Howard
- Capcom vs. SNK: Millennium Fight 2000 (2000) – Geese Howard
- Capcom vs. SNK 2: Millionaire Fighting 2001 (2001) – Geese Howard
- SNK vs. Capcom: SVC Chaos (2003) – Geese Howard, Genjuro Kibagami
- Samurai Shodown V (2003) – Genjuro Kibagami
- Samurai Shodown VI (2004) – Genjuro Kibagami, Neinhalt Seiger
- The King of Fighters Neowave (2005) – Geese Howard
- NeoGeo Battle Coliseum (2005) – Geese Howard, Genjuro Kibagami
- The King of Fighters XI (2005) – Duck King, Geese Howard
- The King of Fighters: Maximum Impact 2 (2006) – Geese Howard, Richard Meyer
- The King of Fighters '98: Ultimate Match (2008) – Geese Howard
- The King of Fighters 2002: Unlimited Match (2009) – Geese Howard
- The King of Fighters XIV (2016) – Geese Howard
- Tekken 7 (2017) – Geese Howard (special moves and grunts)
- Granblue Fantasy (2018) – Genjuro Kibagami
- The King of Fighters All Star (2018–19) – Geese Howard, Genjuro Kibagami
- Samurai Shodown (2019) – Genjuro Kibagami
- The King of Fighters XV (2022) – Geese Howard
- Fatal Fury: City of the Wolves (2025) – Geese Howard, Nightmare Geese

=== Stage ===
- JoJo's Bizarre Adventure: Phantom Blood (2024) – Dario Brando
