= Harumi Ikoma =

Japanese voice actress

- 生駒 治美
- Born: February 5, 1970 (age 56); Osaka, Japan
- Occupation: Voice actress
- Years active: 1992–present
- Agent: J Productions

Harumi Ikoma (生駒 治美, Ikoma Harumi; born February 5, 1970) is a Japanese voice actress that is best known for performing narration and character voices in popular fighting games for SNK. She is the standard voice for the characters Blue Mary, King, Nakoruru, and Charlotte who appear in the popular franchises of video games Fatal Fury, Art of Fighting, Samurai Shodown and The King of Fighters. She is sometimes called by SNK to perform character image songs at SNK's special events. She is affiliated with J Productions.

== Roles ==
=== Anime ===
- Jubei-chan: The Ninja Girl series – Shokou Maruyama
- Kodocha – Fuka Matsui
- Monkey Typhoon – Milk
- Nakoruru: Ano Hito kara no Okurimono – Nakoruru
- Ojarumaru – Sakata Kintaro, Tamura Sayuri, Francious, Damoru Tomeo
- Samurai Spirits 2: Asura Zanmaeden – Nakoruru
- Super Mario Fire Brigade – Tatsuya
- The King of Fighters: Destiny – King
- Yume no Crayon Okuni – Moon Child, Kinta, Pitt

=== Video games ===
- Art of Fighting (1992) – King, Yuri Sakazaki
- Samurai Shodown (1993) – Nakoruru, Charlotte Christine de Colde
- Art of Fighting 2 (1994) – King
- The King of Fighters '94 (1994) – King
- Samurai Shodown II (1994) – Nakoruru, Charlotte Christine de Colde, Mizuki Rashojin
- Fatal Fury 3: Road to the Final Victory (1995) – Blue Mary
- The King of Fighters '95 (1995) – King
- Samurai Shodown III (1995) – Nakoruru
- Real Bout Fatal Fury (1995) – Blue Mary
- Art of Fighting 3: The Path of the Warrior (1996) – Sinclair
- The King of Fighters '96 (1996) – King, Narrator
- Samurai Shodown IV (1996) – Nakoruru, Charlotte Christine de Colde
- Real Bout Fatal Fury Special (1997) – Blue Mary
- The King of Fighters '97 (1997) – Blue Mary, King
- Samurai Shodown 64 (1997) – Nakoruru
- Real Bout Fatal Fury 2: The Newcomers (1998) – Blue Mary
- The King of Fighters: Kyo (1998) – Blue Mary, King, Jean
- The King of Fighters '98 (1998) – Blue Mary, King, Narrator
- Samurai Shodown 64: Warriors Rage (1998) – Nakoruru
- The Last Blade 2 (1998) – Kotetsu Naoe
- The King of Fighters '99 (1999) – Blue Mary, King
- Samurai Shodown: Warriors Rage (1999) – Nakoruru
- The King of Fighters 2000 (2000) – Blue Mary, King
- Capcom vs. SNK: Millennium Fight 2000 (2000) – King
- Capcom vs. SNK 2: Millionaire Fighting 2001 (2001) – King
- The King of Fighters 2001 (2001) – Blue Mary, King
- The King of Fighters 2002 (2002) – Blue Mary, King
- Samurai Shodown V (2003) – Nakoruru, Charlotte Christine de Colde
- The King of Fighters 2003 (2003) – Blue Mary, King
- Samurai Shodown V Special (2004) – Nakoruru, Charlotte Christine de Colde
- The King of Fighters Neowave (2004) – Blue Mary, King
- NeoGeo Battle Coliseum (2005) – Nakoruru
- Samurai Shodown VI (2005) – Charlotte Christine de Colde, Mizuki Rashojin
- The King of Fighters XI (2005) – Blue Mary, King, Narrator
- KOF Maximum Impact Regulation "A" (2008) – Blue Mary
- The King of Fighters XII (2009) – Narrator
- The King of Fighters XIII (2010) – King
- The King of Fighters XIV (2016) – King
- The King of Fighters All Star (2018) – King
- The King of Fighters XV (2022) – King

=== Radio ===
- Neo Chubi
- Yamamoto Mari Falling no Shall We Fall in Love?
- Happy Boy! Drama

=== Dubbing ===
- Stressed Eric – Mrs. Perfect
