= FF8 =

FF8 may refer to:

- Final Fantasy VIII, a 1999 role-playing game originally released on the PlayStation video game console
- Fatal Fury: Wild Ambition, the eight installment of the Fatal Fury fighting game series, released in 1999
- The Fate of the Furious, alternatively known as Fast & Furious 8, a 2017 action film
- Firefox 8, a web browser
