= List of Samurai 7 media and materials =

This is a list of media and materials related to the anime series Samurai 7.

== Anime ==
Samurai 7 is animated by GONZO and directed by Toshifumi Takizawa. The series premiered across Japan on the anime satellite television network, Animax, as an exclusive high definition CS-PPV broadcast, and was also later aired by the network across its other respective networks worldwide, including Southeast Asia, South Asia, Latin America and other regions. FUNimation has acquired the dubbing rights for the North American release. It is airing in America through the Independent Film Channel (using FUNimation's dub) since April 2006 and in high definition on Dish Networks Animania HD channel. It has also been broadcast across Canada by specialty channel Razer and across Hong Kong by TVB Jade.

=== Voice actors ===
==== The Seven Samurai ====
- Kambei Shimada - Masaki Terasoma
- Katsushiro Okamoto - Romi Park
- Kikuchiyo - Kong Kuwata
- Kyuzo - Shin-ichiro Miki
- Gorobei Katayama - Tetsu Inada
- Heihachi Hayashida - Junji Inukai
- Shichiroji - Tōru Kusano

==== The Village ====
- Kirara Mikumari - Fumiko Orikasa
- Komachi Mikumari - Chiwa Saitō
- Rikichi - Tadahisa Saizen
- Okara - Megumi Tano
- Setsu - Atsuko Mine
- Elder Gisaku - Ikuo Nishikawa
- Gosaku - Yōhei Ōbayashi
- Manzo - Naoki Makishima
- Mosuke - Takehiro Murozono
- Yohei - Kenichi Mochizuki

==== Nobuseri ====
- Tanomo - Naoki Makishima
- Genzo - Ryūzaburō Ōtomo
- Sobei - Kazuhiko Kishino

==== Merchant House ====
- Ayamaro - Seiji Sasaki
- Ukyo - Takehito Koyasu
- Tessai - Michihiro Ikemizu
- Hyogo - Takeshi Kusao

==== Others ====
- Amanushi - Takehito Koyasu
- Chiaki - Tadahori Moriya
- Honoka - Kumiko Watanabe
- Masamune - Tomomichi Nishimura
- Mizuki - Chiaki Osawa
- Sanae - Yū Asakawa
- Shino - Yu Kobayashi
- Warya - Rio Natsuki
- Yukino - Rieko Takahashi

=== Funimation voice actors ===
==== The Seven Samurai ====
- Kambei Shimada - R. Bruce Elliott
- Katsushiro Okamoto - Sean Michael Teague
- Kikuchiyo - Christopher Sabat
- Kyuzo - Sonny Strait
- Gorobei Katayama - Bob Carter
- Heihachi Hayashida - Greg Ayres
- Shichiroji - Duncan Brannan

==== The Village ====
- Kirara Mikumari - Colleen Clinkenbeard
- Komachi Mikumari - Luci Christian
- Rikichi - J. Michael Tatum
- Okara - Zarah Little
- Setsu - Juli Erickson
- Elder Gisaku - Andrew Haskett
- Gosaku - Christopher Bevins
- Manzo - Mark Stoddard
- Mosuke - Kyle Hebert
- Yohei - Grant James

==== Nobuseri ====
- Tanomo - Scott McNeil
- Genzo - Sean Schemmel
- Sobei - Michael Sinterniklaas
- Syusai - Brett Weaver

==== Merchant House ====
- Ayamaro - Barry Yandell
- Ukyo - Anthony Bowling
- Tessai - Robert McCollum
- Hyogo - Jerry Jewell

==== Others ====
- Amanushi - Anthony Bowling
- Chiaki - Lucy Small
- Honoka - Carrie Savage
- Masamune - Brice Armstrong
- Mizuki - Laura Bailey
- Sanae - Clarine Harp
- Shino - Monica Rial
- Warya - Jamie Marchi
- Yukino - Gwendolyn Lau

=== Anime opening sequences ===
Title	Artist	Episodes
Unlimited	Nanase Aikawa	01-26

=== Anime ending sequences ===
Title	Artist	Episodes
Fuhen	Rin'	01-26

=== Samurai 7 Region 1 DVD Releases ===
Screenshot	Title	Number	Release date
	Samurai 7 Volume 1: Search for the Seven (Kambei Shimada)	1	August 23, 2005
1. The Master; 2. The Pupil; 3. The Entertainer; 4. The Loner
	Samurai 7 Volume 2: Escape from the Merchants (Katsushiro Okamoto)	2	October 18, 2005
5. The Drifter; 6. The Fool; 7. The Friend; 8. The Guardians
	Samurai 7 Volume 3: From Farm to Fortress (Kikuchiyo)	3	December 13, 2005
9. The Bandits; 10. The Journey; 11. The Village; 12. The Truth
	Samurai 7 Volume 4: The Battle for Kanna (Kyuzo)	4	February 7, 2006
13. The Attack; 14. The Offering; 15. The Gun and The Calm; 16. The Storm
	Samurai 7 Volume 5: Empire in Flux (Gorobei Katayama)	5	March 28, 2006
17. The Remembrance; 18. The Emperor; 19. The Mutiny; 20. The Execution
	Samurai 7 Volume 6: Broken Alliance (Heihachi Hayashida)	6	May 30, 2006
21. The Rescue; 22. The Divide; 23. The Lies
	Samurai 7 Volume 7: Guardians of the Rice (Shichiroji)	7	July 25, 2006
24. The Oaths; 25. The Last Battle; 26. The Era's End
	Samurai 7: The Complete Series		July 1, 2008
Episodes 1 - 26
