= Ward Perry =

Canadian voice actor (born 1970)

- Born: March 20, 1970 (age 56); British Columbia, Canada
- Occupation: Voice actor
- Years active: 1992–2009
- Notable credit(s): Gundam SEED and Gundam SEED Destiny as Kojiro Murdoch; InuYasha the Movie 3: Swords of an Honorable Ruler as Sounga

Ward Perry (born March 20, 1970) is a Canadian voice actor and ADR script writer who voiced characters for several anime dubbed in Vancouver, British Columbia, Canada. He is known as the voice of Dragon Ball Z villain Dr. Wheelo, Rowen of the Strata in Ronin Warriors, Geese Howard in the Fatal Fury animations, Scavenger in Transformers: Armada, and the first voice of Landmine in Transformers: Energon. Perry retired in 2009 and has not appeared in television since.

== Credits ==
=== Voice Talent ===
- Adieu Galaxy Express 999 – Additional voices
- Animated Classic Showcase – Various characters
- Billy the Cat – Additional voices
- Brain Powered – Gabriel Gaybridge
- Capertown Cops
- Death Note – Hitoshi Demegawa
- Dragon Ball Z (Ocean Group dub) – Kami (Dead Zone), King Yemma (Saiyan Saga), Dr. Wheelo, Turles, Sansho, Misokatsun
- Fatal Fury
  - Fatal Fury: Legend of the Hungry Wolf – Geese Howard, Richard Meyer
  - Fatal Fury 2: The New Battle – Geese Howard, Laurence Blood
  - Fatal Fury: The Motion Picture – Laurence Blood, Geese Howard, Richard Meyer
- Galaxy Express 999 – Additional voices
- G.I. Joe: Spy Troops – Agent Faces
- Gundam
  - Mobile Suit Gundam – Ryu Jose
  - Mobile Suit Gundam SEED – Kojiro Murdoch, Captain Zelman
  - Mobile Suit Gundam SEED Destiny – Kojiro Murdoch
  - Mobile Suit Gundam Wing – Howard, Otto, Pagan, Abdul, Marquise Weridge, Dr. J
  - Mobile Suit Gundam: Encounters in Space – Ryu Jose
- Inuyasha – Wild Dog Princess, Serina and Suzuna's father, Gamajiro, Kawaramaru, Ongokuki, additional voices
  - Inuyasha the Movie: Swords of an Honorable Ruler – Sō'unga
  - Inuyasha the Movie: Fire on the Mystic Island – Gōra
- Key the Metal Idol – "A"
- MegaMan NT Warrior – StoneMan, DesertMan
- Monkey Magic – Jade Emperor, East General
- Monster Rancher – Big Blue, Datonare, Jagd Hound, various
- Night Warriors: Darkstalkers' Revenge – Huitzil
- Project ARMS – Keith Red
- Ronin Warriors – Rowen of the Strata, Sekhmet
- Skysurfer Strike Force – Brad Wright
- Super Kid – Maio
- Transformers: Armada – Scavenger, Frustrated Guy
- Transformers: Energon – Landmine
- Vision of Escaflowne (Ocean Group dub) – Gadess
  - Escaflowne (Ocean Group dub) – Gaddes
- Warriors of Virtue – Villager
- X-Men: Evolution – Helicopter Pilot

=== Recording Assistant ===
- My Little Pony Tales

=== Dialogue Recording ===
- Spiff and Hercules
