= Fatal Fury: Legend of the Hungry Wolf =

- Directed by: Hiroshi Fukutomi
- Written by: Takashi Yamada
- Based on: Fatal Fury: King of Fighters by SNK
- Produced by: Hiromichi Mogaki (Studio Comet); Tatsuji Yamazaki (Nihon Ad Systems); Yoshihiro Suzuki (Fuji Television)
- Starring: Kazukiyo Nishikiori; Keiichi Nanba; Masaaki Satake; Kikuko Inoue; Hidekatsu Shibata; Unshō Ishizuka; Kōji Yada; Daiki Nakamura; Hisao Egawa
- Music by: Toshihiko Sahashi; Toshio Masuda
- Production companies: Nihon Ad Systems, Studio Comet
- Release date: December 23, 1992
- Running time: 45 minutes
- Country: Japan
- Languages: Japanese, English

Fatal Fury: Legend of the Hungry Wolf (Note: Known in Japan as Battle Fighters Garō Densetsu (バトルファイターズ 餓狼伝説, Batoru Faitāzu Garō Densetsu; lit. Battle Fighters: Legend of the Hungry Wolf)) is an animated TV special based on the fighting game Fatal Fury. It originally aired on Fuji TV on December 23, 1992. The movie was directed by Hiroshi Fukutomi and features character designs by Masami Ōbari. An English adaptation was produced by Viz Communications, which was released on home video in 1994. A sequel, Fatal Fury 2: The New Battle, was released in 1993.

== Plot ==
In Southtown, young Terry and Andy Bogard are out with their master, Tung Fu Rue, and their adoptive father, Jeff Bogard. Jeff is distracted by a group of poor children who beg him for money and a pretty, young flower girl as part of an attempt on his life by four attackers, one of whom succeeds in stabbing him. He is then confronted by his old rival Geese Howard, and dies of his wounds. In front of his grave, Tung makes the boys promise that in ten years, they will reunite as much stronger men to punish Geese.

Ten years later, Terry returns to Southtown. Geese learns of his return from his right-hand man, Billy Kane, while Terry has a drink in a bar he owns. Along the way, Terry meets Lily McGuire, the beautiful Queen of South Town, in Pao Pao Cafe, who tosses a rose into the air and is pleased when Terry catches it. Terry later finds Lily outside talking to some poor children and giving them food and money. He recognizes her as the flower girl who helped Geese murder his father, but does not hold it against her since she was too young back then. Lily implies that she heavily blames herself for her role in Jeff's murder. Afterwards, he meets Joe Higashi, a champion Muay Thai kickboxer and a long-time friend and rival of Andy. Joe is in Southtown to enter the King of Fighters tournament, and Terry befriends him upon learning that he is his brother's friend. Terry is then reacquainted with Andy and Tung. Tung tells them of a technique called the Hurricane Punch that only he knows, which he will teach to only one of them. Terry decides that both he and Andy should enter the King of Fighters tournament and should one of them be the victor, Tung will teach him the technique.

When Geese learns that the brothers are entering the tournament, he sets a trap for them. He has Lily deliver poisoned champagne to Terry before his fight, but she fails because of her feelings towards him, as he is the only one who has seen her true self and might redeem her of her former sins. Terry defeats his opponent, Richard Meyer, and makes it to the final fight with his brother Andy. As the fight starts, Joe notices a man who tries to assassinate the Bogards and takes the bullet intended for them. With the help of Lily, the three escape the tournament, but Geese tosses her off a window with his Reppuken wave technique. A dying Lily asks him again for forgiveness over Jeff's death, and Terry reassures her that he's never blamed anyone, but Geese, for it, and she dies with a smile.

Tung is seriously injured by Billy Kane and hospitalized in a coma. Andy, angered by Tung's injuries, sets off to Geese's lair with Joe. Tung emerges from his coma and teaches Terry the Hurricane Punch, but the effort of demonstrating it kills him.

Andy and Joe battle their way to Geese, but neither are strong enough to defeat him. Terry arrives and attacks Geese using his new technique, which barely has an effect. He absorbs more energy and ends up with a new technique, the Hurricane Kick, which defeats Geese. Later, Terry, Andy and Joe meet up at Jeff Bogard's grave before going their separate ways.

== Characters ==
Terry Bogard
Voiced by: Tsutomu Kashiwakura (child) and Kazukiyo Nishikiori (adult) (Japanese); Christopher Turner (child) and Mark Hildreth (adult) (English)
A martial artist seeking to avenge his father's death.
Andy Bogard
Voiced by: Tomoko Maruo (child) and Keiichi Nanba (adult) (Japanese); Tony Sampson (child) and Peter Wilds (adult) (English)
Terry's younger brother and an expert in Koppōjutsu.
Joe Higashi
Voiced by: Masaaki Satake (Japanese); Jason Gray-Stanford (English)
A Japanese Muay Thai boxing champion who befriends the Bogard brothers.
Lily McGuire
Voiced by: Kikuko Inoue (Japanese); Willow Johnson (English)
A very beautiful and sad young woman known as the "Queen of South Town", who is desired by the men of the city and marked by her tragic past. Lily is an original character created for the film, but she makes a cameo appearance in the Mexico stage in The King of Fighters '94.
Geese Howard
Voiced by: Hidekatsu Shibata (Japanese); Ward Perry (English)
A crime boss and martial artist who host the King of Fighters tournament.
Jeff Bogard
Voiced by: Unshō Ishizuka (Japanese); David Kaye (English)
Terry and Andy's adoptive father and martial artist, who was murdered by Geese.
Tung Fu Rue
Voiced by: Kōji Yada (Japanese); Mina Mina (English)
The martial arts master who trained Geese and Jeff. He later teaches Terry in order to help him defeat Geese.
Billy Kane
Voiced by: Daiki Nakamura (Japanese); Paul Dobson (English)
A staff-wielding fighter employed by Geese.
Raiden
Voiced by: Hisao Egawa (Japanese); Robert O. Smith (English)
A villainous wrestler also working for Geese.
