= Characters of the Fatal Fury series =

Fictional character

Several Fatal Fury characters as seen in City of the Wolves

The following is a list of video game characters featured in the Fatal Fury fighting game series developed by SNK.

== Creation and design ==
Series' creator Takashi Nishiyama stated that giving the characters depth was of great importance when making the series. He noted that the first Fatal Fury featured a more polished plot and more fleshed out characters than that of his previous work, the original Street Fighter, which led to the game gaining a strong fanbase. To help market the games, certain character details were revealed in magazine promotions rather than the games themselves.

== Character appearances ==
The table below summarizes every single fighter in the series. A green cell indicates that the character is playable, while a red cell indicates that the character is not playable or does not appear.

Character	Fatal Fury	Fatal Fury 2	Fatal Fury Special	Fatal Fury 3	Real Bout	Real Bout Special	Real Bout Dominated Mind	Real Bout 2	Wild Ambition	First Contact	Mark of the Wolves	City of the Wolves	Total
Alfred	No	No	No	No	No	No	Yes	Yes (Note: Secret boss. Playable in Fatal Fury Battle Archives version only.)	No	Yes	No	TBA	3
Andy Bogard	Yes	Yes	Yes	Yes	Yes	Yes (Note: Includes alternate "EX" version)	Yes	Yes	Yes	Yes	No	DLC	11
Axel Hawk	No	Yes	Yes	No	No	No	No	No	No	No	No	TBA	2
Billy Kane	Yes	Yes	Yes	No	Yes	Yes	Yes	Yes	Yes	Yes	No	Yes	10
Blue Mary	No	No	No	Yes	Yes	Yes	Yes	Yes	No	No	No	DLC	6
Bob Wilson	No	No	No	Yes	Yes	Yes	Yes	Yes	No	No	No	TBA	5
B. Jenet	No	No	No	No	No	No	No	No	No	No	Yes	Yes	2
Cheng Sinzan	No	Yes	Yes	No	No	Yes	Yes	Yes	No	No	No	TBA	5
Chun-Li (Note: Guest character)	No	No	No	No	No	No	No	No	No	No	No	DLC	1
Cristiano Ronaldo	No	No	No	No	No	No	No	No	No	No	No	Yes	1
Duck King	Yes	No	Yes	No	Yes	Yes	Yes	Yes	Yes	No	No	DLC	8
Franco Bash	No	No	No	Yes	Yes	Yes	Yes	Yes	No	No	No	TBA	5
Freeman	No	No	No	No	No	No	No	No	No	No	Yes	TBA	1
Gato	No	No	No	No	No	No	No	No	No	No	Yes	Yes	2
Geese Howard	Yes	No	Yes	Yes	Yes	Yes	Yes	Yes	Yes	Yes	No	DLC (Note: As Nightmare Geese)	10
Grant	No	No	No	No	No	No	No	No	No	No	Yes	TBA	1
Hokutomaru	No	No	No	No	No	No	No	No	No	No	Yes	Yes	2
Hon Fu	No	No	No	Yes	Yes	Yes	Yes	Yes	No	No	No	TBA	5
Hotaru Futaba	No	No	No	No	No	No	No	No	No	No	Yes	Yes	2
Hwa Jai	Yes	No	No	No	No	No	No	No	No	No	No	TBA	1
Jin Chonrei	No	No	No	Yes	Yes	Yes	Yes	Yes	No	No	No	TBA	5
Jin Chonshu	No	No	No	Yes	Yes	Yes	Yes	Yes	No	No	No	TBA	5
Joe Higashi	Yes	Yes	Yes	Yes	Yes	Yes	Yes	Yes	Yes	Yes	No	DLC	11
Jubei Yamada	No	Yes	Yes	No	No	No	No	No	No	No	No	TBA	2
Kain R. Heinlein	No	No	No	No	No	No	No	No	No	No	Yes	Yes	2
Ken Masters	No	No	No	No	No	No	No	No	No	No	No	DLC	1
Ken Ryūgūji	No	No	No	No	No	No	No	No	No	No	No	DLC	1
Kenshiro	No	No	No	No	No	No	No	No	No	No	No	DLC	1
Kevin Rian	No	No	No	No	No	No	No	No	No	No	Yes	Yes	2
Kim Dong Hwan	No	No	No	No	No	No	No	No	No	No	Yes	Yes	2
Kim Jae Hoon	No	No	No	No	No	No	No	No	No	No	Yes	DLC	2
Kim Kaphwan	No	Yes	Yes	No	Yes	Yes	Yes	Yes	Yes	Yes	No	DLC	9
Lao	No	No	No	No	No	No	No	No	No	Yes	No	TBA	1
Laocorn	No	No	No	No	No	No	No	No	No	No	No	DLC	1
Laurence Blood	No	Yes	Yes	No	No	Yes	Yes	Yes	No	No	No	TBA	5
Li Xiangfei	No	No	No	No	No	No	No	Yes	Yes	Yes	No	TBA	3
Mai Shiranui	No	Yes	Yes	Yes	Yes	Yes	Yes	Yes	Yes	Yes	No	Yes	10
Manjirō Sano	No	No	No	No	No	No	No	No	No	No	No	DLC	1
Marco Rodrigues	No	No	No	No	No	No	No	No	No	No	Yes	Yes	2
Michael Max	Yes	No	No	No	No	No	No	No	No	No	No	TBA	1
Mr. Big	No	No	No	No	No	No	No	No	No	No	No	DLC	1
Mr. Karate	No	No	No	No	No	No	No	No	No	No	No	DLC	1
Preecha	No	No	No	No	No	No	No	No	No	No	No	Yes	1
Raiden/Big Bear	Yes (Note: As Raiden)	Yes (Note: As Big Bear)	Yes	No	No	No	No	No	Yes	No	No	TBA	4
Reina	No	No	No	No	No	No	No	No	No	No	No	DLC	1
Richard Meyer	Yes	No	No	No	No	No	No	No	No	No	No	TBA	1
Rick Strowd	No	No	No	No	No	No	No	Yes	No	Yes	No	DLC	3
Rock Howard	No	No	No	No	No	No	No	No	No	No	Yes	Yes	2
Ryuji Yamazaki	No	No	No	Yes	Yes	Yes	Yes	Yes	Yes	Yes	No	TBA	7
Ryo Sakazaki	No	No	Yes	No	No	No	No	No	Yes	No	No	TBA	2
Salvatore Ganacci	No	No	No	No	No	No	No	No	No	No	No	Yes	1
Sokaku Mochizuki	No	No	No	Yes	Yes	Yes	Yes	Yes	No	No	No	TBA	5
Terry Bogard	Yes	Yes	Yes	Yes	Yes	Yes	Yes	Yes	Yes	Yes	Yes	Yes	12
Tizoc	No	No	No	No	No	No	No	No	No	No	Yes	Yes	2
Touji Sakata	No	No	No	No	No	No	No	No	Yes	No	No	TBA	1
Tsugumi Sendo	No	No	No	No	No	No	No	No	Yes	No	No	TBA	1
Tung Fu Rue	Yes	No	Yes	No	No	Yes	Yes	Yes	No	No	No	TBA	5
Vox Reaper	No	No	No	No	No	No	No	No	No	No	No	Yes	1
White	No	No	No	No	No	No	Yes (Note: Non-playable boss)	No	No	No	No	TBA	1
Wolfgang Krauser	No	Yes	Yes	No	No	Yes	Yes	Yes	No	Yes	No	DLC	7
Total	11	12	16	13	16	20	22	23	14	13	14	TBA	

== Introduced in Fatal Fury ==
=== Andy Bogard ===
Voiced by: Jun Hashimoto (FF2–KOF '94), Keiichi Nanba (FF3–KOF XIII), Hiroshi Okamoto (KOF XIV onwards), Hiroyuki Kagura (young; KOF: D), Toshinari Fukamachi (KOF for Girls) (Japanese); Peter Wilds (FF anime films), Kieran Regan (COTW, SF6) (English)

Andy Bogard (アンディー・ボガード, Andī Bogādo) is Terry Bogard's younger brother. After his foster father Jeff's death, Andy goes to Japan to train under Hanzo Shiranui, from whom he learns Shiranui-ryū ("Shiranui style" in Japanese) Ninjutsu and a form of empty-handed ninja combat called Koppō-ken. During this time, he grows up alongside Hanzo's granddaughter Mai, who falls madly in love with him and begins proclaiming him her fiancé. While in Japan, Andy meets Muay Thai fighter Joe Higashi, inviting him to return with him to the United States and enter Geese Howard's King of Fighters tournament.

Late in the tournament, Andy tried to kill Geese by himself, but Geese overpowers him and Andy nearly falls to his death. Terry saves Andy, who then acknowledges Terry as the superior fighter. Andy continues to join Terry in the subsequent King of Fighters tournaments, though he sustains a serious chest wound in the brothers' final battle with Geese.

After Geese's death, Andy resumes his training, taking on a young apprentice named Hokutomaru. Instead of participating in the KOF: Maximum Mayhem tournament himself, Andy sends Hokutomaru in his place to see what his apprentice has learned. In Hokutomaru's ending, Andy writes him a note expressing pride in Hokutomaru's strength, saying he has nothing left to teach him. In City of the Wolves, Andy continues to suffer from his chest wound, but decides to enter the new tournament despite the risks to prove to himself that he is strong enough to defeat Terry in a fight.

In the King of Fighters series, Andy regularly appears on a team alongside Terry and Joe, joined in entries with four person teams by Mai or Blue Mary. During the Ash Crimson Saga, Andy briefly leaves the team to care for the ill Hokutomaru before later returning at his brother's request. In his anime incarnations, though sometimes perplexed by her actions, Andy is more open to showing his affection towards Mai.

In The King of Fighters XIV, its established that Andy and Mai are now in a relationship.

=== Billy Kane ===
Voiced by: Katsuhisa Namase (FF2–KOF '95), Keiichi Nanba (FF3, "RBFF When start fight", Dengeki Bunko drama CD: Garō Densetsu), Atsushi Yamanishi (RBFF–KOF 2002, KOF: MI series), Seijirō (KOF 2003, KOF: AD, KOF XIII), Masaki Masaki (KOF XIV onwards), Shizuka Itō (Pretty Billy; KOF: AS), Haruki Ishiya (KOF for Girls), Daiki Nakamura (FF: LOTHW), Tomohiro Nishimura (FF: TMP) (Japanese); Paul Dobson (FF: LOTHW), Chris Sharpes (COTW) (English)

Billy Kane (ビリー・カーン, Birī Kān) is introduced in Fatal Fury as the righthand man of Geese Howard, a crime lord in the fictitious American city of South Town. Geese holds The King of Fighters tournament every year with Billy as his champion. Billy was the undefeated champion of the tournament, until he is defeated by Terry Bogard, who moved on to later defeat Geese. He also appears in Fatal Fury Special as a playable character for the first time. After Geese recovers, Billy appears in Real Bout Fatal Fury to assist him in the conquer of South Town. Though Geese requests Billy destroy the Jin Scrolls, Billy cannot bring himself to do so, replacing them with fakes and hiding the real ones away, and he leaves South Town after Geese's death. He later appears in the two following games from the series Real Bout Fatal Fury Special and Real Bout Fatal Fury 2: The Newcomers which do not contain a storyline. In the PlayStation version from Real Bout Fatal Fury Special, Billy is brainwashed by his half-brother White in order to aid him in the conquer from South Town. He then appears as a sub-boss character in the arcade mode, but once he is defeated, he returns to normal. A 3D fighting game version of the series, Fatal Fury: Wild Ambition was produced as well, which retells the plot of the first game. By the time of City of the Wolves, Billy has assumed control of the Howard Connection after Geese's death, and works with Geese's son Rock Howard and brother-in-law Kain R. Heinlein to retrieve Geese's stolen legacy, including the Jin Scrolls. After the Scrolls are destroyed and learning of the Jin dynasty's connection to Geese and Rock, Billy accepts Rock's decision to move on, retaining control of Geese's legacy.

In The King of Fighters series, Billy was meant to appear in the first game from the series as a member of an England Team, composed of him, Mai Shiranui, and Big Bear, but due to several problems with the capacity of the game, and the desire from the Art of Fighting staff to add Yuri Sakazaki, Billy was removed from the game. When the new King of Fighters tournament began in The King of Fighters '95 under the control of a man named Rugal Bernstein, Billy is ordered by Geese to go in his boss' place because Geese was still healing. He joins with a ninja named Eiji Kisaragi and a mysterious man named Iori Yagami. Billy's team does not win, and at the end of the tournament Iori beats up Billy and Eiji. In The King of Fighters '97 Geese sends Billy to investigate the mysterious Orochi power in Iori. Geese hires a sadistic outlaw named Ryuji Yamazaki and tricks a good freelance agent named Blue Mary to help as well. After the tournament ends, Yamazaki demands his pay from Geese by attacking him and Billy. The same team is shown in The King of Fighters '98, The King of Fighters 2002 and Neowave but none of those contain a storyline. He also appears as an assistant character (known as "Striker") in The King of Fighters '99: Evolution and The King of Fighters 2000. In the former he is available for any character, while in the latter he is a striker for Andy Bogard.

In The King of Fighters 2003, Geese orders the team of Billy Kane, Ryuji Yamazaki, and Gato to infiltrate the tournament in another attempt to take over South Town. During the spin-off game The King of Fighters Kyo Billy appears as boss character along Geese to fight against the Bogard brothers and the protagonist Kyo Kusanagi. In KOF: Maximum Impact 2, it is revealed Billy has moved to the countryside of the UK with his young sister, Lilly Kane, and has decided to return to South Town once again, willing to show the Meira twins: Alba and Soiree the town should be embarked by no one.

Billy also appeared in the console version of The King of Fighters XIII, released in November 2011. He is also present in the otome game King of Fighters for Girls.

Billy Kane appears in the TV anime film Fatal Fury: Legend of the Hungry Wolf, where he is voiced by Daiki Nakamura in the original Japanese version and Paul Dobson in the English dubbed version. Like in the original Fatal Fury video game, Billy Kane is one of Geese Howard's underlings alongside Raiden, Ripper and Hopper. He enters the King of Fighters tournament alongside Raiden on Geese's behalf and later mortally wounds Tung Fu Rue while the Bogards and Joe are escaping from Geese's men. In the final battle of the film, he ends up fighting against Andy Bogard and ends up being defeated by him. He appears again in the sequel Fatal Fury 2: The New Battle, where he makes an unvoiced appearance in the beginning of the film, in which he is confronted by Laurence Blood at the Pao-Pao Cafe and is defeated off-screen. Billy makes an extended cameo appearance in the third film, Fatal Fury: The Motion Picture, this time voiced by Tomohiro Nishimura in the original Japanese version and once again by Paul Dobson in English. He encounters his old adversary Andy in a night club, but the two are confronted by Laocorn's henchman Hauer before they get a chance to fight again.

In the second episode of the anime spin-off mini-series The King of Fighters: Another Day, Rock Howard, Geese's son, stops Billy from killing Lien Neville who was carrying out a hit on him. Billy tries to convince Rock to help him, because as he carries Geese's heritage, Lien would try to take him out too. Instead, Rock decides to save Lien's life and fights Billy, who almost manages to kill him as well for shaming Geese's legacy, but is blown away by a beam fired over Geese Tower. He also stars in manhua from the video games which retells his actions from the games. Additionally, in the manga The King of Fighters: Kyo authored by Masato Natsumoto, Billy starts investigating Kyo Kusanagi in order to make him talk about the ancient demon Orochi.

In Gamest's 1997 Heroes Collection, Billy was voted as the staff's fourth favorite character. In the character popularity poll on Neo Geo Freak's website, he was voted as the seventeenth favorite character with a total of 757 votes. For the special endings in The King of Fighters '97, three video games journals, Gamest, Famitsu and Neo Geo Freak, had to create a team composed of three characters from the game so that they would be featured in an image after passing the arcade mode. The special team created by the Neo Geo Freak's staff was a team of fire wielders: Billy, Kyo Kusanagi, and Mai Shiranui. The special ending only appears in Japanese versions of the game.

=== Duck King ===
Voiced by: Kong Kuwata (RBFF–KOF XI), Yūji Mitsuya (FF: TMP), Anri Katsu (COTW) (Japanese); Matt Hill (FF: TMP), Cedric L. Williams (COTW) (English)

Duck King (ダック・キング, Dakku Kingu) appears in the original Fatal Fury as one of the first four opponents in the single-player mode. Possessing incredible talent when it comes to brawling and street dancing, Duck King once challenged Terry Bogard to a street fight and lost. He trained himself in order to surpass Terry. Duck uses a unique fighting style which includes rhythmical dance-like movements and attacks. His primary special move is a flying cannonball technique.

In Fatal Fury 2, Duck was one of the characters from the original game who is defeated by Krauser in one of the game's cut scenes, although he would appear as a playable character in Fatal Fury Special. He would retain his cannonball technique, now dubbed the Head Spin Attack, along with new special moves such as the Dancing Dive, Break Storm, and the Beat Rush. He also has a new hidden special move called the Break Spiral. From Special and onward, Duck would be accompanied by his pet duck chick "P-chan". He makes another quick cameo in Bob Wilson's ending Fatal Fury 3 before returning as a playable character in Real Bout Fatal Fury and its sequels, Real Bout Special and Real Bout 2. He also appears as an exclusive character in the PlayStation version of Fatal Fury: Wild Ambition. Duck King returns as part of the third season of downloadable content in City of the Wolves. In the game's story, he enters the King of Fighters tournament to help Richard earn enough money to prevent Kain from buying out Pao Pao Cafe, accompanied by the great granddaughter of the original P-chan.

Although Duck King has made numerous cameo appearances thorough The King of Fighters series, including as an alternate Striker (a character who helps the player in battle) in The King of Fighters 2000, he did not appear as a playable character until The King of Fighters XI, where he appears as a member of the new Fatal Fury Team along with Terry and Kim Kaphwan.

=== Hwa Jai ===
Voiced by: Sōnosuke Nagashiro (KOF XIII)

Hwa Jai (ホア・ジャイ, Hoa Jai) is the first of three opponents the player faces in the original Fatal Fury before the final match against Geese Howard. A former Muay Thai champion once nicknamed "The Hero of Muay Thai" (ムエタイの英雄, Muetai no Eiyū), he once fought against Joe Higashi in the past and lost, causing him to lose his title. Seeking to defeat Joe, he became a more reckless and dangerous fighter. After being banned from competing in the Muay Thai circuit, his brutal talent was noted by Geese Howard, who hired him to serve as one of his bodyguards and a participant in the King of Fighters tournament. His special technique, the Dragon Kick, was developed to compete with Joe's Tiger Kick. He also gains additional strength by drinking a sort of Super Drink, which thrown at him by one of Geese's men when he is in danger.

In Fatal Fury 2, Hwa Jai is one of the characters from the original game who gets defeated by Wolfgang Krauser. He is apparently hospitalized and visited by Joe Higashi, as seen in Joe's ending in the game and in Fatal Fury Special. He makes further cameos in the subsequent Fatal Fury games (Fatal Fury 3, Real Bout, Real Bout Special and Real Bout 2) as Joe's training partner and trainer. Despite having been absent since his original appearance as an opponent character in Fatal Fury, Hwa Jai has been confirmed to return in The King of Fighters XIII and marks the first time the character has been playable. Kim, following his "reform" of his previous teammates (Chang Koehan and Choi Bounge), seeks out Hwa Jai and Raiden as he believes they still work under Geese Howard. It is not the case as Geese had returned to America long ago but Raiden manages to talk Hwa Jai into joining the team to bolster their reputations as fighters. Hwa Jai accepts, partially due to wanting to fight Joe once again.

=== Joe Higashi ===
Voiced by: Katsuhisa Namase (FF2–KOF '94), Nobuyuki Hiyama (FF3 – KOF XIII), Kōzō Mito (KOF XIV onwards), Chiharu Sawashiro (KOF for Girls), Masaaki Satake (FF: LOTHW), Kazuki Yao (Dengeki Bunko drama CD) (Japanese); Jason Gray-Stanford (FF anime films), Kevin Andrew Rivera (COTW, SF6) (English)

Joe Higashi (ジョー・ヒガシ, Jō Higashi; also written as 東 丈, Higashi Jō) first appears in Fatal Fury: King of Fighters as one of the three playable characters along with Andy and Terry Bogard. The plot features Joe allying with the Bogard brothers to enter the King of Fighters tournament and then defeat the host Geese Howard, who killed the Bogard brothers' father. In the tournament, Joe also beats his Muay Thai rival Hwa Jai, and they both become friends. In Fatal Fury 2, Joe learns that Hwa Jai was beaten by the new King of Fighters host Wolfgang Krauser and enters the tournament to avenge him. Fatal Fury 3: Road to the Final Victory and Real Bout Fatal Fury end the fight between Joe and the Bogard and Geese, who dies falling from the Geese Tower. The two following games, Real Bout Fatal Fury Special and Real Bout Fatal Fury 2: The Newcomers also feature Joe as a playable character but none of them contain a storyline. Fatal Fury: Wild Ambition retells the events from the first game, but with characters who would appear later. Joe returns in City of the Wolves, now training Preecha as his student and assisting Cheng Sinzan with producing a biopic about his life, The Legend of Joe.

In The King of Fighters series, Joe is a regular member from the Fatal Fury Team (also composed of Terry and Andy), and each game features them entering into an annual tournament to search for competition. Andy's girlfriend Mai Shiranui, joins them in The King of Fighters '99 since the tournament now requires four members per team. By The King of Fighters 2000 and The King of Fighters 2001, Mai leaves and the new fourth member is Blue Mary. The King of Fighters 2002 and The King of Fighters 2003 return the tournament to use teams of three members, but in the latter pro-wrestler Tizoc replaces Andy, who is busy taking care of his sick student. By The King of Fighters XI, Joe leaves the competition as he enters into a new Muay Thai tournament. However, he returns in The King of Fighters XII, which neither features official teams or plot. The sequel casts Joe back into the classic Fatal Fury team that includes Terry and Andy, the reason being Terry's desire to reunite the original team to participate in the upcoming tournament. In the spin-off The King of Fighters Kyo, the player (who uses Kyo Kusanagi) can challenge Joe to a fight in a game, and also make him join to his team for the upcoming King of Fighters tournament. Joe also takes a minor role in The King of Fighters EX as an assistant character (dubbed "Striker") for the Fatal Fury Team, now composed with the Bogard brothers and Mai. Additionally, he stars in The King of Fighters Neowave with the original Fatal Fury Team. He was also added to the crossover game Capcom vs. SNK Pro, an updated version of Capcom vs. SNK: Millennium Fight 2000 for the PlayStation and Sega Dreamcast, and in the sequel Capcom vs. SNK 2. He is also present the otome game King of Fighters for Girls. Joe appears in Super Smash Bros. Ultimate as a background character at King of Fighters Stadium.

Joe Higashi appears in each of the three animated films from Fatal Fury. Jason Gray-Stanford provides the voice of Joe in the English versions. Masaaki Satake provides the voice of Joe in the Japanese version of the first film and Nobuyuki Hiyama in the two following. In the Fatal Fury: Legend of the Hungry Wolf from 1993, Joe enters the King of Fighters tournament along with the Bogard brothers which cause Geese Howard to attack them. Upon learning that Andy and Terry's teacher, Tung Fu Rue, was seriously injured by Geese's right-hand man, Billy Kane, Andy and Joe set to fight Geese. None of them are able to defeat Geese, but are saved by Terry who later defeats Geese. In the 1993 film Fatal Fury 2: The New Battle, Joe becomes ashamed after learning that Terry became depressed after being defeated by Wolfgang Krauser and tries to avenge him. However, he ends up being heavily wounded by Krauser. In Fatal Fury: The Motion Picture from 1994 Joe joins Terry, Andy and Mai into helping a girl named Sulia into stopping her brother Laocorn Gaudeamus, who is the main antagonist from the film.

=== Michael Max ===
Michael Max (マイケル・マックス, Maikeru Makkusu) is a black boxer who appears in the original Fatal Fury as one of the first four CPU-controlled opponents whom the player faces. Prior to the events of the game, Michael was a young boxing prodigy who was once considered a strong contender for the title of Worldwide Heavyweight Champion. However, he left the boxing circuit to seek real combat and participate in the King of Fighters tournament, feeling that professional boxing was a mere sport protected by rules. He is also the friend and student of boxing of Axel Hawk. His only other appearances in the series includes in the cut-scenes of Fatal Fury 2, where he is one of the fighters defeated by Wolfgang Krauser, and in Axel Hawk's ending in Fatal Fury Special, where he is depicted as Axel's trainer. In one of his victory poses, it is revealed that he is Catholic. Michael Max is the only character from the original Fatal Fury that has never appeared in The King of Fighters series until he makes a cameo at one of The King of Fighters XV trailer.

=== Raiden / Big Bear ===
Voiced by: Dango Takeda (FF2–FFS), Hisao Egawa (FF anime films), Daisuke Gōri (KOF XII–KOF XIII), Kentaro (COTW) (Japanese); John Hulaton (FF3–CVS2), Robert O. Smith (FF anime films), Iain Gibb (KOF XIII), Chris Okawa (COTW) (English)

Raiden (ライデン, Raiden) first appears in the original Fatal Fury as the second of the final four computer-controlled opponents in the single-player mode. He was once a popular face wrestler until he was betrayed by his tag partner during a match (a character later revealed to be Big Bombarder from the SNK wrestling game 3 Count Bout). This incident transformed him completely and he became a notorious heel wrestler. Not satisfied with venting his frustration in the ring, he enters the King of Fighters tournament as a masked fighter, acting as one of Geese's guardians. His primary special move in the game is the Vapor Breath. This character was modeled after real life pro wrestler Big Van Vader.

He returns as a regular playable character in Fatal Fury 2 and Fatal Fury Special, where he renounces his Raiden persona and now fights as an unmasked face wrestler under the identity of Big Bear (ビッグ・ベア, Biggu Bea). He trains at his native land of Australia, where his deadly strength increased on several levels. He also develops a friendly rivalry with Terry, as seen in his endings in both games. His special moves in Fatal Fury 2 includes the Giant Bomb, a rushing tackle, and the Super Drop Kick. He also has a hidden special move called the Fire Breath, an improved version of his Vapor Breath. In Special, he gains a new special move called the Bear Bomber. He later cameos as a wrestling commentator in City of the Wolves.

Fatal Fury: Wild Ambition, being a retelling of the original Fatal Fury tournament, depicts Raiden under his masked heel persona once again. Outside the Fatal Fury series, Raiden also appeared in the Capcom-produced crossover game Capcom vs. SNK: Millennium Fight 2000, and its sequels, Capcom vs. SNK Pro and Capcom vs. SNK 2, being one of the few Fatal Fury characters who did not appear in The King of Fighters as a playable character (at the time) in those games. Raiden also appears in The King of Fighters XII and the sequel. In KOF XII none of the characters are assigned into teams but for KOF XIII they are. Raiden's teammates in KOF XIII are Kim Kaphwan and Hwa Jai. Kim is mistaken in thinking Raiden and Hwa Jai are still in the employ of Geese Howard, wanting to "reform" both men. Raiden convinces Hwa Jai to act as if they are so they are able to enter the tournament to build reputation for themselves. The Fatal Fury characters refer him as "Bear", his face persona, which he denies.

=== Richard Meyer ===
Voiced by: Masaharu Satō (FF: TMP), Kong Kuwata (KOF: MI2) (Japanese); Ward Perry (FF anime films) (English)

Ricardo "Richard" Meyer (リチャード・マイヤー, Richādo Maiyā) appears in the original Fatal Fury as one of the first four computer-controlled opponents in the single-player mode. A capoeira mestre originally from Brazil, Richard makes his daily living in South Town as the manager of the restaurant Pao Pao Cafe. He competes in the King of Fighters tournament in order to make his capoeira style known to the world. In this game, his character specializes in numerous kick techniques. Richard Meyer was the first fighting game character to use Capoeira.

Richard makes cameo appearances in subsequent Fatal Fury games as a friendly acquaintance of the Bogard brothers and Joe. He appears in Fatal Fury 2 in the cut scene shown immediately after the first battle against the CPU, tending to a crowd of spectators at Pao Pao Cafe witnessing the player's fight on television. He appears again near the end of the game, where he is defeated in battle by Wolfgang Krauser, as well in Terry Bogard's ending, serving him and his date their meal.

In Fatal Fury 3, Richard opens a new Pao Pao Cafe restaurant, which is maintained by his capoeira apprentice Bob Wilson. In Fatal Fury 3, as well as in Real Bout series, Richard appears to cheer and encourage Bob before each of his matches. He makes cameos in The King of Fighters XI, trying to tell Kim to leave the cafe and in King of Fighters XIII witnessing several female fighters destroy his bar.

Richard appears as a hidden character in the PlayStation 2 game KOF: Maximum Impact 2 (released in North America as The King of Fighters 2006), participating as a fighter for the first time since the original Fatal Fury. Richard's real given name is Ricardo.

=== Tung Fu Rue ===
Voiced by: Keiichiro Sakagi (FFS), Kōji Yada (FF: LOTHW), Shigefumi Nakai (RBFFS–KOF XI), Hajime Shikase (KOF XIV) (Japanese); Mina E. Mina (FF: LOTHW, FF2: TNB) (English)

Tung Fu Rue (タン フー ルー, Tan Fū Rū; Chinese: 糖胡芦; Pinyin: Táng Hú-Lú) is one of the first four opponents the players face in the original Fatal Fury (when either Andy or Terry defeats him in Fatal Fury Special, each Bogard brother addresses him as "Master Tan"). He is an elderly martial arts master from China who developed his own fighting style based on Bajiquan known as the Holy Fist of Eight Ways (八極聖拳, Hakkyokuseiken). In the past, he trained Terry and Andy's adoptive father, Jeff Bogard, and his nemesis Geese Howard (as well as Cheng Sinzan). He raised the Bogard brothers after Jeff was killed by Geese and participates in the King of Fighters tournament in the first game with the objective to defeat Geese. He can transform his body into steel and draw out great power using a deadly secret technique known only to himself. In the game, he appears as meek elderly man, but after taking a bit of damage, he transforms into a musclebound warrior, whose special moves including a flying whirlwind punch and a spinning whirlwind kick in which he shoots fireballs at both directions.

In Fatal Fury 2, Tung was one of the characters defeated by Wolfgang Krauser in one of the game's cut-scene. He would appear as a playable character in Fatal Fury Special, the upgraded version of Fatal Fury 2. Unlike the original game, Tung only transforms into a musclebound version of himself while performing certain special moves. Tung reappears in Real Bout Special and Real Bout 2. In Real Bout Special, there are two versions of him in the game. In regular version of him has improved versions of his previous special moves, as well as new moves, while the alternate version of him (EX Tung Fu Rue) has all of his moves from Fatal Fury Special and one Hidden Ability. In Real Bout 2, Tung has special moves from both versions of his character in the previous game.

Tung also appears in the SNK crossover game NeoGeo Battle Coliseum. This version of the character was used as an additional character in the PlayStation 2 port of The King of Fighters XI, until he canonically participates in The King of Fighters XIV. He is also one of the 20 background characters that appears in the King of Fighters Stadium Stage in Super Smash Bros. Ultimate.

In The King of Fighters timeline, Tung played a vital role in XIV. According to a profile of one of his disciples, and the protagonist central character of that arc, Shun'ei, Tung found Shun'ei after his biological parents abandoned him for having an eerie powers, related to the main antagonist of that arc. Sensing good in the young eerie powered boy, Tung decided to raise Shun'ei as his disciple to be trained by himself against the villains who had a connection to Shun'ei's eerie power, such as the villain who is connected to Shun'ei's left-half power, an avatar of fiery rage and soul containing entity known as Verse. Additionally, he has met Kyo Kusanagi's father, Saisyu Kusanagi, and a fellow elderly Chinese martial arts master, Chin Gentsai, sometime before.

== Introduced in Fatal Fury 2 and Fatal Fury Special ==
=== Axel Hawk ===
Voiced by: Hirohiko Kakegawa (FF2: TNB) (Japanese); Michael Dobson (FF2: TNB) (English)

Axel Hawk (アクセル・ホーク, Akuseru Hōku) first appears in Fatal Fury 2 as the second of the final four opponents in the single-player mode. A former heavyweight boxing champion, he was said to be the strongest of all time until his retirement. According to his backstory, he began spending most of his days at home after his retirement, playing with his R/C car and being supported by his elderly mother, his father having died at some point. One day, he received an anonymous letter inviting him to the King of Fighters tournament and began training for his comeback. He was originally a non-playable character in the Neo Geo version of Fatal Fury 2, although he is playable in the SNES and Genesis versions of the game. He became a regular playable character in Fatal Fury Special. He is also the teacher of boxing and the best friend of Michael Max. He makes a cameo at the end of The King of Fighters 2003 cheering on the Fatal Fury Team.

=== Cheng Sinzan ===
Voiced by: Jun Hashimoto (FF2–FFS), Shigefumi Nakai (RBFFS–RBFF2), Chafurin (FF: TMP) (Japanese); Robert O. Smith (FF: TMP) (English)

Cheng Sinzan (チン・シンザン, Chin Shinzan; Chinese: 陳 秦山; Pinyin: Chén Qínshān; Cantonese Yale: Chàhn Chèuhn-sāan) is introduced as one of the new playable characters in Fatal Fury 2. A rotund fighter, he practices tai chi. Despite his immense strength, he hates training and becomes tired very easily. He enters the King of Fighters tournament seeking to gain international recognition and open his own training hall. He is characterized as one of the richest men in Hong Kong, who resides in a high class neighborhood and is married to a former Miss Hong Kong. Despite his social status, he seeks to find ways to make himself even richer. His Special Moves in Fatal Fury 2, as well as in Fatal Fury Special, includes the Thunderblast Powerball (氣雷砲, Kiraihō), the Belly Drum Blast (大太鼓腹打, Daitaikobarauchi), and the Avalanche Crunch (破岩激, Hagangeki), while his Super Special Move is the Exploding Thunder Powerball (爆雷砲, Bakuraihō).

He makes a non-playable appearance in Fatal Fury 3, helping Hon-Fu chase after Ryuji Yamazaki and doesn't return as a playable character until Real Bout Special and Real Bout 2. In the backstory of Real Bout Special, it is revealed that Cheng was once a disciple of Tung Fu Rue trained in Hakkyoku Seiken along with Jeff Bogard and Geese Howard, but was expelled due to his greediness. He would also make money by having people bet against him in street fights and then lose on purpose. He returns as a non-playable character in City of the Wolves, where he is producing a biopic about Joe Higashi.

=== Jubei Yamada ===
Voiced by: Dango Takeda (FF2–FFS), Jōji Yanami (FF anime films) (Japanese); French Tickner (FF anime films) (English)

Jubei Yamada (山田 十平衛, Yamada Jūbei) is one of the five playable characters introduced in Fatal Fury 2. An elderly judo master who was once known as "Yamada, the Demon" during his youth. Jubei Yamada is the best friend and rival of Hanzo Shiranui (the grandfather of Mai Shiranui). Having lost his charm from his younger days, Jubei fights in the new King of Fighters tournament in order to re-establish his popularity with girls around the world. Despite this, he refuses to change his womanizing lecherous ways. Although Jubei does not return as a playable character in later games, he makes several cameo appearances, including in Mai Shiranui's ending in Real Bout Fatal Fury, where he is shown to have an infatuation with her.

=== Kim Kaphwan ===
Voiced by: Satoshi Hashimoto (FF2–KOF XI), Kazuhiko Nagata (KOF XII–KOF XIV), Daiki Nakamura (FF2: TNB, FF: TMP), Hiroshi Isobe (Dengeki Bunko drama CD: Garō Densetsu 2 and Garō Densetsu Special), Kunihiro Kawamoto (KOF: D onwards), Ayaka Ōhashi (KOFAS; New Kim), Takuya Eguchi (KOF for Girls) (Japanese); David Kaye (FF2: TNB, FF: TMP), June Yoon (COTW) (English)

Kim Kaphwan (金甲煥 (キム・カッファン), Kimu Kaffan, sometimes written as Kim Kap-Hwan 김갑환 (Kim Kap-hwan)) first appears in Fatal Fury 2 as a playable character. He travels to South Town to fight Wolfgang Krauser, who was looking for some decent challenges in the King of Fighters fighting tournament. On the way, he encounters the former King of Fighters champion Terry Bogard. They soon become good friends, and ever since, Kim always agrees to help Terry in all that he can, though a definite rivalry is maintained. He also appears in all the Real Bout games from the series. He is also present in Fatal Fury: Wild Ambition, a 3D game which retells the story from the first Fatal Fury game but with characters from the sequels including Kim. He makes a cameo appearance in Garou: Mark of the Wolves in one of his son's (Dong Hwan) win poses.

In The King of Fighters, Kim is considered as both a sport and national hero in his native Korea. This status is what enabled him to convince the authorities to give him custody over Chang Koehan and Choi Bounge to rehabilitate them out of their criminal ways. Although both men resent Kim for his actions, they later grow up to grudgingly respect him. Due to the increase of required members in The King of Fighters '99, Kim's rival, Jhun Hoon, joins the Korea Team. However, in The King of Fighters 2001, Jhun has an accident and he is replaced by Kim's student, May Lee. By The King of Fighters 2003, the requirements of members return to three and this time the members of the Korea Team are Kim, Jhun and Chang. In The King of Fighters XI, Kim appears as a member of the Fatal Fury Team along with Terry Bogard and Duck King as the team needed one more member. In The King of Fighters XII, Kim is a playable character, but like each of them, he does not have a team. As The King of Fighters XIII has returned to assigning the characters into official teams, Kim is cast as the leader of his team, composing of himself, Raiden and Hwa Jai (both from Fatal Fury: King of Fighters). He is teamed with the men because, after "rehabilitating" Chang and Choi, he seeks out Raiden and Hwa Jai believing they are still working for Geese (they are not but they pretend that they still do so they can compete in The King of Fighters tournament). The games from the series which do not contain plot, The King of Fighters '98 and The King of Fighters 2002, also feature Kim along with Choi and Chang in the Korea Team. In the console version of The King of Fighters Neowave, Kim appears as a hidden character without an official team.

In the spin-off game, The King of Fighters Kyo, Kim is not playable but he can be aided by the lead character Kyo Kusanagi in order to train Chang and Choi. In the two games for the Game Boy Advance titled EX: Neo Blood and EX2, the Korea Team is featured in its original form. Kim does not appear in KOF: Maximum Impact as he was replaced with his pupil Chae Lim. However, he is a hidden character in KOF: Maximum Impact 2 and also makes a cameo in Chae Lim's ending. He also appears in the crossovers Neo Geo Battle Coliseum and the SNK vs. Capcom series as a playable character. In Super Smash Bros. Ultimate, he appears both as a background character in the King of Fighters Stadium stage and as a Spirit.

Kim also appears in two of the three animated films from Fatal Fury in which he takes supporting roles. He is voiced by Daiki Nakamura in the Japanese versions and by David Kaye in the English dub. In Fatal Fury 2: The New Battle, Kim challenges Terry to fight after learning that he defeated the former crime lord from South Town Geese Howard to test his own strength. Although he is defeated, he and Terry become good friends. In the sequel, Fatal Fury: The Motion Picture, he also appears reuniting with Terry and his friends along with his family searching to have a rematch with Terry. However, during the meeting Cheng Sinzan (from Fatal Fury 2), enhanced by cyber-armor attacks all the people and Kim is seriously injured. Despite his wounds, Kim manages to defeat Cheng, but spends most of the time of the film recovering. He also stars in manhua from the video games which retell his actions from the games.

=== Laurence Blood ===
Voiced by: Katsuhisa Namase (FF2–FFS), Hiroyuki Arita (RBFFS–RBFF2), Kōji Totani (FF anime films) (Japanese); Ward Perry (FF anime films) (English)

Laurence Blood (ローレンス・ブラッド, Rōrensu Buraddo) first appears in Fatal Fury 2 as the third of the four boss characters the player faces at the end of the single-player mode. He is a former Spanish matador who uses a self-styled martial art based on his deadly bullfighting methods (his fighting style is very similar to the fencing and the French martial art of the Savate). He serves as the right-hand man and servant of Wolfgang Krauser and participates in the tournament under his request. He is a computer-only character in the Neo Geo version of Fatal Fury 2 and became playable in Fatal Fury Special. Blood would return as a playable character in Real Bout Fatal Fury Special and Real Bout Fatal Fury 2. He is notable for being one of five bullfighter characters in fighting games (the other three being Vega of Street Fighter, Miguel of Human Killing Machine, Miguel Caballero Rojo of Tekken, and Kilian of Samurai Shodown). He is also the only boss character from Real Bout Fatal Fury Special and Real Bout Fatal Fury 2 that hasn't appeared in the King of Fighters tournaments.

=== Wolfgang Krauser ===
Voiced by: Hirotaka Suzuoki (FF2: TNB), Takuya Iwabata (young; KOF:D), Yutaka Aoyama (KOFAS, CotW) (Japanese); B.J. Love (KOF '96–RBFF2), Paul Dobson (FF2: TNB), Patrick Seitz (CotW) (English)

Wolfgang Krauser von Stroheim made his appearance in Fatal Fury 2, where he serves as the final opponent in the tournament. Known as the only man in the world feared by Geese Howard (whom in Fatal Fury Special is revealed to be his elder half-brother from the same father, Rudolph Krauser von Stroheim or Rudolph Von Zanac), Krauser is a German nobleman who is publicly known as the current Earl of Stroheim, a prestigious family in Europe, but within the underworld he is a ruthless warlord known as the Emperor of Darkness. After Geese's supposed death in the original Fatal Fury, Krauser sponsors a new King of Fighters tournament with his three chosen warriors Laurence Blood, Axel Hawk and Billy Kane (a former underling of Geese himself) in order to lure the men who defeated Geese (Terry Bogard, Andy Bogard, and Joe Higashi).

Although Krauser is said to have taken his own life following the events of Fatal Fury 2 and Special according to later story material, he appeared in the special installments of the series, Real Bout Fatal Fury Special and Real Bout Fatal Fury 2. Krauser returns as downloadable content in Fatal Fury: City of the Wolves, serving as the main antagonist of the "Wolves' Destiny" story expansion. The game reveals his family's connection to the Jin dynasty, and that Krauser faked his death, biding his time and regaining his strength over the following decade. After his son Franz hosts a King of Fighters tournament for Geese's stolen legacy, Krauser returns to South Town to take control of the city and get revenge on Terry.

Outside the Fatal Fury series, Krauser appears as a member of the Boss Team in The King of Fighters '96 with his half-brother Geese and Geese's former partner-in-crime Mr. Big. The Boss Team made another appearance in the remake of The King of Fighters '98 titled The King of Fighters '98 Ultimate Match. Additionally, Krauser also appears as a "Striker" character in the console versions of The King of Fighters 2000.

Krauser serves as the main antagonist in the anime special Fatal Fury 2: The New Battle. According to character designer Masami Ōbari (who also worked on Voltage Fighter Gowcaizer), Krauser was redesigned to be ten years younger than his video game counterpart and given a clean-shaved appearance. In this special, Krauser challenges his half-brother's nemesis Terry Bogard to battle and wins. After Terry regains his courage, he challenges Krauser again and wins the rematch, causing Krauser to commit suicide due to his loss.

== Introduced in Fatal Fury 3 ==
=== Blue Mary ===
Voiced by: Harumi Ikoma (FF3–KOF: MIR"A"), Sarah Emi Bridcutt (KOF XIV onwards) (Japanese); Allegra Clark (COTW, SF6) (English)

Mary Ryan (マリー・ライアン, Marī Raian), better known as Blue Mary (ブルー・マリー, Burū Marī), is a special agent investigating activity in the city of Southtown, and a recurring love interest of Terry Bogard. She makes her first appearance in Fatal Fury 3: Road to the Final Victory, investigating the Secret Scrolls of the Jin Brothers, items able to give immortality to their users. Real Bout Fatal Fury shows Mary allying with Terry Bogard and his friends to fight the crime lord from Southtown, Geese Howard. The two following games, Real Bout Fatal Fury Special and Real Bout Fatal Fury 2: The Newcomers, also feature Blue Mary as a playable character but neither of them presents a storyline. Real Bout Fatal Fury Special also features an "EX" version from Mary with her movesets from Fatal Fury 3. The PlayStation version of Real Bout Fatal Fury Special also contains a music video clip featuring the song "Blue Mary's Blues" by Harumi Ikoma, Mary's voice actress. She returns as downloadable content in City of the Wolves, helping her distant relative Kevin Rian secure Geese Howard's legacy.

Following her Fatal Fury inception, Blue Mary becomes a regular character with frequently changing team membership in The King of Fighters series, beginning as a member of the '97 Special Team in The King of Fighters '97 along with Billy Kane and Ryuji Yamazaki. A mysterious benefactor (Geese Howard) requests her services to enter the King of Fighters tournament, along with Billy and Yamazaki, who starts to become insane due to the power from the demon Orochi. However, after discovering that Geese was her client, Mary leaves the team. The team is also featured in The King of Fighters '98, The King of Fighters 2002, and The King of Fighters Neowave, which do not contain a storyline. In The King of Fighters '99, she joins up with King, Li Xiangfei, and Kasumi Todoh as the new Women Fighters Team, but leaves and becomes the fourth member of the Fatal Fury Team (composed by Terry, Andy Bogard and Joe Higashi) in The King of Fighters 2000 and The King of Fighters 2001. She would join forces with King again as member of the Women Fighters Team in The King of Fighters 2003, this time with Mai Shiranui as their third member. In The King of Fighters XI, she joins Vanessa and Ramón as a member of the Agents Team in order investigate the host from The King of Fighters tournaments, an organization named Those from the Past. Blue Mary appears in The King of Fighters XIV as a playable character via downloadable content. In The King of Fighters XV, she joins Vanessa again to form the Secret Agent Team, with Luong as their third member. She also appears in the 3D game KOF: Maximum Impact Regulation A, which does not feature official teams. In the spin-off game The King of Fighters: Kyo, Blue Mary appears investigating the actions from Geese along with Kyo Kusanagi and King. In Nintendo's Super Smash Bros. Ultimate, she appears as a background character.

=== Bob Wilson ===
Voiced by: Toshiyuki Morikawa

Roberto "Bob" Wilson (ボブ・ウィルソン, Bobu Wiruson) is a character introduced in Fatal Fury 3 and appears as a playable character throughout the Real Bout sub-series. He is the bartender of Pao Pao Cafe 2 and was trained in capoeira by Richard Meyer. He specializes in spinning kicks and combination attacks. He later cameos as a bartender at a separate restaurant in City of the Wolves. All of his special moves reference animals in some way, as his Fatal Fury 3 Special Moves are the Wild Wolf, the Bison's Horn, the Lynx's Fang, the Rolling Turtle, and the Hornet Attack. His Super Special Move is the Dangerous Wolf. In Real Bout, he gains the Monkey Dance special move and two Hidden Abilities, the Mad Spin Wolf and the Wolf's Fang. Real Bout Special brings in the Sidewinder, Hunting Frog and Hawk Talon Special Moves, and Real Bout 2 discards Bob's previous Hidden Abilities for a new one called Dancing Bison.

=== Franco Bash ===
Voiced by: B.J. Love

Franco Bash (フランコ・バッシュ, Furanko Basshu) makes his first appearance in Fatal Fury 3 as one of the five new playable characters introduced in the game and also appears thorough the Real Bout sub-series. He is a retired Super Heavyweight-class kickboxing champion who works as a mechanic in South Town Airport to support his wife Emilia, and their son Junior. In Fatal Fury 3 his son is kidnapped by Yamazaki, who blackmails him into helping him obtain the Secret Scrolls of the Jin. He rescues his son in his ending in Fatal Fury 3 and trains to make his comeback in the Real Bout series. He makes a cameo at the end of KOF 2003 cheering on the Fatal Fury Team.

=== Hon-Fu ===
Voiced by: Toshiyuki Morikawa

Hon-Fu (ホンフゥ, Hon Fū) is introduced in Fatal Fury 3 as one of the new playable characters featured in the game and appears all the games in the Real Bout sub-series. He is a police officer from Hong Kong who specializes in using a nunchaku. His objective throughout Fatal Fury 3 and the Real Bout series is to arrest the escaped convict Ryuji Yamazaki and is aided by Cheng in Fatal Fury 3. He is a close friend of Kim Kaphwan according to his backstory in Fatal Fury 3, as the two have nearly identical desperation attacks, although Hon-Fu was given a new one for Real Bout Fatal Fury 2.

=== Jin Chonshu and Jin Chonrei ===
Voiced by: Kappei Yamaguchi

Jin Chonshu (秦 崇秀, Japanese: Jin Chonshū, Pinyin: Qín chóngxiù, also romanized as Qin Chong-Xiu) and Jin Chonrei (秦 崇雷, Japanese: Jin Chonrei, Pinyin: Qín Chóngléi, also romanized as Qin Chong-Lei) appear in Fatal Fury 3 as the second and final boss characters respectively, and appear as regular playable characters thorough the Real Bout series. While they appear to be regular teenage boys, Chonshu and Chonrei are is actually possessed by the spirits of Jin Kairyu (秦 海龍) and Jin Kuryu (秦 空龍), their ancestors and the sons of the ancient warlord Jin Ōryū (秦 王龍) who wrote the Secret Scrolls of the Jin dynasty two thousand years prior. In Fatal Fury 3, the Jin brothers head to South Town to seek the Secret Scrolls of the Jin in order to unleash their true power. The scrolls are eventually taken by Geese Howard and in the next game of the series, Real Bout Fatal Fury, the Jin brothers participate in the King of Fighters tournament, now free of their possession and hoping to destroy the scrolls now that they know of their curse. In Real Bout Fatal Fury 2, Chonrei becomes an apprentice of Tung Fu Rue, while Chonshu becomes a disciple of Kim Kaphwan. City of the Wolves reveals the Sacred Scrolls survived, along with the existence of a third son of Ōryū, Jin Tairyu (秦 太竜), whose descendants eventually became the Stroheim family, making the Jin brothers distant relatives of Wolfgang Krauser, Geese Howard, and Rock Howard. Tairyu briefly possesses Rock, but is defeated and the scrolls destroyed, allowing his soul to rest. Outside the Fatal Fury series, Jin Chonshu and Jin Chonrei have appeared in Neo Geo Battle Coliseum.

In Gamest's 1997 Heroes Collection, Chonrei was voted as the staff's thirty-ninth favorite character. He shared the spot with four other characters, including Fatal Fury character, Joe Higashi, and Street Fighter character, Zangief.

=== Ryuji Yamazaki ===
Voiced by: Kōji Ishii (FF3–KOF 2003), Tsuguo Mogami (KOF XIV onwards), Kenjiro Tsuda (KOF for Girls)

Ryuji Yamazaki (山崎 竜二, Yamazaki Ryūji) is first introduced as the sub-boss character of Fatal Fury 3: Road to the Final Victory, where he is a criminal known as "Dark Broker". In the game, Yamazaki is hired by the Jin brothers into recovering their Sacred Scrolls, which are able to give immortality to its user. In the following titles from the series, Yamazaki does not work for anybody, normally committing crimes just to entertain himself, despite to this, however, he had secretly still wanting to take the scrolls from Geese. In Garou: Mark of the Wolves, he was believed to be the perpetrator of beating all of Marco Rodrigues's best students in his Kyokugenryu karate gym, as depicted in Marco's ending. Yamazaki's introduction in The King of Fighters series was made as a result of three popularity polls developed by three video games journals in which players voted which character they wanted to see in The King of Fighters '97, the upcoming game from the series at that time. Yamazaki has also appeared in the crossover games Capcom vs. SNK: Millennium Fight 2000 and Capcom vs. SNK 2 as a playable character. Video games publications have commented on Yamazaki's character, with some praising his introduction in Fatal Fury 3 and development in titles from The King of Fighters. Other reviewers criticized how hard defeating him is in the Fatal Fury games and how strong he is in Capcom vs. SNK: Millennium Fight 2000 in comparison to other popular characters.

Yamazaki's origin in The King of Fighters series eventually revealed that he was a former member of Hakkeshu, the followers of Orochi. Having had lost his father-figure yakuza boss that made him a psychopath, it saves Yamazaki from Orochi's Riot of the Blood mind control.

=== Sokaku Mochizuki ===
Voiced by: Kōji Ishii (FF3–RBFF2), Yusuke Tokuda (COTW) (Japanese); Eli Schiff (COTW) (English)

Sokaku Mochizuki (望月 双角, Mochizuki Sōkaku) is introduced in Fatal Fury 3 as one of the five new characters featured in the game and appears in all of the games in the Real Bout series. Mochizuki is a Buddhist monk who practices the Authentic Pathless style Martial Arts (正伝無道流武術, Seiden Mudō Ryū Bujutsu), a fighting style created to hunt down Shura after its founder lost to the Shiranui style. He is said to have the strongest psychokinetic power in the history of the art's style. In Fatal Fury 3 and the original Real Bout, his objective is to seek the Scrolls of the Jin and destroy them, because he believes that it would be a source of a Shura. His Real Bout 2 ending shows him trapping a demon larger than a house within a single paper talisman.

== Introduced in Dominated Mind ==
=== Alfred ===
Voiced by: Hiro Yūki

Alfred (アルフレッド, Arufureddo) is the protagonist of the main story mode in Real Bout Garou Densetsu Special: Dominated Mind, a Japan-only PlayStation game based on the original Real Bout Fatal Fury Special. Prior to his debut, he appears as a secret final boss in both Real Bout Fatal Fury 2: The Newcomers and Fatal Fury: First Contact. When he was young, his friend John (the elderly co-pilot who accompanies Alfred) took him on a trip on his biplane. When John flew to Russian airspace, MiG missiles were sent after him, but he managed to outfly them without getting struck. John became a hero in Alfred's mind, as the man who won against the MiGs, and Alfred was charmed by flying since then. Alfred seeks to defeat White, who took over the hometown where his deceased father is interred. Alfred goes to Southtown to seek Terry Bogard's aid and help him defeat White.

Alfred makes minor appearances in later games, including as a secret striker in the Dreamcast version of The King of Fighters '99, as a trading card in SNK vs. Capcom: Card Fighters' Clash, and as a stage cameo in KOF: Maximum Impact 2 and KOF 2002: Unlimited Match.

=== White ===
Voiced by: Keiji Fujiwara

White (ホワイト, Howaito) is the antagonist of Real Bout Garou Densetsu Special, where he serves as Alfred's rival. A demented psycho and all-around disturbed fellow, White finds pleasure in making people suffer and follow his every wish. He uses his mind-controlling abilities to make people his personal toys, manipulating them to his desire. White enjoys playing around with those foolish enough to challenge him, using the great amount of power that he possesses. He appears to be based on the main character Alex from Anthony Burgess' A Clockwork Orange novel.

== Introduced in Real Bout Fatal Fury 2 ==
=== Lao ===
Lao (ラオ, Rao) is a character who first appears in the opening sequence of Real Bout 2, being defeated by Rick Strowd. He makes his only playable appearance in the versus mode of Fatal Fury: First Contact. In Garou: Mark of the Wolves, he becomes a member of B. Jenet's Lillien Knights crew.

=== Li Xiangfei ===
Voiced by: Mami Kingetsu

Li Xiangfei (Chinese: 李 香緋; Pinyin: Lǐ Xiāngfēi; Japanese: 李 香緋 Rii Shanfei) makes her first appearance in Real Bout 2. She is a 17-year-old Chinese-American girl who works part-time as waitress in her Uncle Pai's restaurant in the Chinatown district of South Town and has trained in various Chinese martial arts since an early age. She also appears as a playable character in Fatal Fury: Wild Ambition.

Li Xiangfei would later make her debut in The King of Fighters series in The King of Fighters '99, forming part of the Woman Fighters Team along with King, Blue Mary, and Kasumi Todoh. She was absent in The King of Fighters 2000, but would return in The King of Fighters 2001, taking Kasumi Todoh's place from the previous game.

=== Rick Strowd ===
Voiced by: Taney Yamaguchi (RBFF2), Yasutaka Azuma (COTW) (Japanese); Alejandro Saab (COTW) (English)

Rick Strowd (リック・ストラウド, Rikku Sutoraudo) is one of the two new characters introduced in Real Bout 2. He is a casino show boxer known as the "White Wolf of the Ring", who is the son of a Native American father and a white mother. He seeks the opportunity to fight in a championship match as well as fight Terry Bogard. In City of the Wolves, Rick's wife Catherine is left comatose after a car accident, despite her injuries being only minor. Believing the Jin Scrolls may be responsible for her slumber, Rick joins the King of Fighters tournament in the hopes of destroying them and waking Catherine.

Rick's Special Moves are the Shooting Star, the Divine Blast, the Hellion, and the Blazing Sun Burst. He also has a special dodging maneuver called Full Moon Fever. His Super Special is the Gaia's Breath, and his Hidden Ability is the Machine-Gun Wolf. Fans have speculated a probable connection between Rick and fellow boxer, Vanessa, from SNK's King of Fighters series, as she later began using Rick's Hellion, and had the Gaia's Breath as a DM in The King of Fighters 2002.

== Introduced in Wild Ambition ==
=== Toji Sakata ===
Voiced by: Masashi Sugawara

Toji Sakata (坂田 冬次, Sakata Tōji) is one of two characters who appears exclusively in Fatal Fury: Wild Ambition. He is the legendary practitioner of the fighting style Dainan-ryū Aiki-jūjutsu (大南流合気柔術; lit. "The Great South Style of Aiki-jūjutsu", modeled the non-fictional Daitō-ryū Aiki-jūjutsu). He was once the best friend and the rival of Tatsumi Suoh (周防 辰巳, Suō Tatsumi), Blue Mary's grandfather and the man who trained Geese Howard in jujutsu. Believing that he was destined to challenge Tatsumi in a death match, this encounter never occurred since Tatsumi was eventually killed by his former student, Geese Howard. He enters the King of Fighters tournament to defeat the man who killed his rival.

=== Tsugumi Sendo ===
Voiced by: Kayo Deguchi

Tsugumi Sendo (千堂 つぐみ, Sendō Tsugumi) is one of the two new characters exclusive to Fatal Fury: Wild Ambition. She is a high school girl from Osaka who was taught wrestling by her father, Kantetsu (寛鉄) since an early age. However, she is secretly ashamed of this, especially after she was told by a boy she had a crush on that women wrestlers are "unfeminine",which made her want to drop out of her wrestling training. After butting heads with her overbearing father, Kantetsu agreed to let her to drop out, but only under the condition that she brings a decisive victory in the King of Fighters tournament. Despite her original hatred for wrestling, she has come to enjoy fighting as she begins to win matches. Some of Tsugumi's move names reference her hometown, like "Tsūtenkaku Driver", "Naniwa Lariat", and "Okonomiyaki-Ire".

== Introduced in Mark of the Wolves ==
=== B. Jenet ===
Voiced by: Rei Saitō (MOTW–KOFAS), Mikako Komatsu (KOF XV onwards) (Japanese); Amber Lee Connors (COTW) (English)

B. Jenet (B・ジェニー, B Jenī), real name Jenet Behrn (ジェニー・バーン, Jenī Bān), is the leader of a group of pirates known as the Lillien Knights. Jenet entered the Maximum Mayhem to rob Kain R. Heinlein of anything valuable he might be keeping in his mansion. In her ending, she passes out amidst the destruction of Kain's mansion after defeating him. Her crew saves her from being trapped under the rubble, but fails to secure any of the treasure they had been looking for. She decides to stay in South Town for some time, leading her to participate in the new King of Fighters tournament in City of the Wolves for another chance at Kain's fortune.

In The King of Fighters Maximum Impact 2, her parents are revealed to be incredibly wealthy; she formed the Lillien Knights when she became bored of her tedious lifestyle. Before the start of the tournament, she attends a party in her otherwise occupied parents' place. While there, the son of the host attempts (and fails quite miserably) to impress her with his paltry skills in Savate. Although Jenet is rather repulsed by his arrogance and embarrassing lack of skill, she learns from him that the King of Fighters tournament is being held once again. After her Lillien Knights knock the man unconscious and rob his father, Jenet decides to join the tournament in hopes of winning the prize money.

Jenet is very comfortable around men, and her win quotes and prefight and postfight animations express that she does not seem very serious about fighting. In The King of Fighters XI, she was in the tournament for monetary gain strictly, and she enters with Tizoc and Gato to form the Fatal Fury/Mark of the Wolves team.

Her fighting style, the LK (Lillien Knights) arts, is similar to savate, a French form of kickboxing. Her moves are mostly made up of attacks by swooping her dress (in moves such as specials "The Hind" and "Crazy Ivan" and Super Special Move "Aurora") and she is able to control the wind (being reflected in her projectile attack "Buffrass" and her Super Special Move "Too Many Torpedoes"). Her Super Special Leader Move "An Oi Madamoiselle" sees her take off her left shoe and beat her opponent with it.

Her appearance consists of a purple dress with a skull and crossbones, red fingerless gloves, a red belt with gold lining, and blonde hair, along with stiletto heels as used in "An Oi Madamoiselle".

=== Freeman ===
Voiced by: Eiji Yano (MOTW), Go Shinomiya (COTW) (Japanese); River Vitae (COTW) (English)

Freeman (フリーマン, Furīman), real name unknown, is a mysterious English serial killer that fights using slashing movements with his hands as if they were claws. Little is known about him, except that he killed Kevin Rian's partner.In Mark of the Wolves, he enters the King of Fighters: Maximum Mayhem tournament hoping to kill strong opponents, barely managing to escape from a police sniper. In City of the Wolves, Freeman emerges from hiding and attempts to kill Blue Mary and Marky, but Terry and Kevin rescue them and Freeman is finally arrested. Many of Freeman's special techniques are references to heavy metal bands, such as Nightmare, Morbid Angel, Overkill, and Vision of Disorder.

=== Gato ===
Voiced by: Kōji Ishii (MOTW–KOF XI), Yuma Yamaguchi (KOF XV onwards) (Japanese); Cory Yee (COTW) (English)

Gato (牙刀, Gatō) is a martial artist searching for his missing father, Gao, whom he believes responsible for killing his mother six years prior. His sister Hotaru Futaba encourages him to come home, though he keeps his distance for her protection. In his Mark of the Wolves ending, Gao saves Kain R. Heinlein from the crumbling mansion, but blinds Gato before he can act. As Gao taunts Gato, he angrily swears vengeance. In City of the Wolves, Gato joins the tournament to once again search for Gao. Though his sight has mostly recovered, he now fights with his eyes closed to enhance his other senses and movements. He eventually encounters Hotaru and Kain again, and learns that Grant had attempted to assassinate Gao, who was an enforcer for a rival crime family, with Gato's mother being accidentally killed by Grant during the encounter. Now knowing the truth, Gato agrees to let Hotaru accompany him to find their father.

Gato first appears in the King of Fighters series in King of Fighters 2003 as part of the Outlaw Team, along with Ryuji Yamazaki and Billy Kane. Gato is summoned to Geese Howard's office and forced to cooperate in order to prevent his sister from being harmed. Gato does not like his teammates at all as revealed by the ending, in which Gato ditches the other two immediately and tells them off, leaving Yamazaki and Billy to fight. In The King of Fighters XI he is partnered with B. Jenet and Tizoc to form a Garou Team. In The King of Fighters XV, he and Jenet are joined by Rock Howard, who replaces Tizoc, because the wrestler has reasons to go by his heel persona "King of Dinosaurs" and already joined another team during the tournament. In both Garou team endings, he also immediately leaves his teammates, though on friendlier terms.

=== Grant ===
Voiced by: Yō Kitazawa (MOTW), Kentaro (COTW) (Japanese); Eli Schiff (COTW) (English)

Grant (グラント, Guranto), real name Abel Cameron (アベル・キャメロン, Aberu Kyameron), is Kain R. Heinlein's closest friend and personal bodyguard. Having protected Kain and his sister Marie since they were young, Grant becomes disillusioned with the state of the world, and makes a deal with a dark entity that grants him knowledge of the dark style known as Ankoku Karate. Prior to the events of Mark of the Wolves, Grant accidentally killed the mother of Hotaru Futaba and Gato, who got caught in a crossfire between him and Gao, then takes a bullet for Kain that becomes lodged near his heart, leading him to seek one last great battle before it kills him. He appears as the sub-boss of Mark of the Wolves. In City of the Wolves, Grant makes the rescue of Marie his final mission before he passes, while asking that Kain allow his apprentice Vox Reaper to take his place as Kain's bodyguard. After Marie's rescue, Grant finally dies and Vox inherits his mask.

=== Hokutomaru ===
Voiced by: Junko Takeuchi (MOTW), Junya Enoki (COTW) (Japanese); Caleb Yen (COTW) (English)

Hokutomaru (北斗丸) is a ninja and the student of Mai Shiranui and Andy Bogard, the latter of whom sends him to participate in the Maximum Mayhem tournament to complete his Shiranui style ninjutsu training. His stage is a traffic accident that he caused, as he was unfamiliar with urban ways due to living in the mountains. He returns in City of the Wolves, having undergone a growth spurt and moved to South Town to learn more about how to live in the modern world, with the help from Andy's brother, Terry, and enters the King of Fighters tournament to show the results of his training.

Hokutomaru is extremely fast and crafty, with many moves that are among the fastest in the Wolves sub-series, making him a nearly unpredictable opponent to deal with. He carries a sword on his back in Mark of the Wolves, but he seldom draws it except during two special moves.

=== Hotaru Futaba ===
Voiced by: Yuki Horie (MOTW–KOFAS), Manaka Iwami (COTW) (Japanese); Suzie Yeung (COTW) (English)

Hotaru Futaba (双葉 ほたる, Futaba Hotaru) is a martial artist who practices the Juu-kei style of Chinese kenpo, though she generally dislikes violence. Following her mother's death and the disappearance of her father Gao and brother Gato, she enters the Maximum Mayhem tournament after hearing rumors her brother is participating. In her ending, she meets up with Gato, begging him to come home, but he tells her to stay away and departs as she silently prays for her brother to return to her. In City of the Wolves, she and Gato learn the truth of their mother's death and work together to find and defeat their father, leading their family to reconcile.

Outside of the Fatal Fury series, Hotaru is playable in Neo Geo Battle Coliseum and the PS2 version of The King of Fighters XI.

=== Kain R. Heinlein ===
Voiced by: Jun Hashimoto (MOTW), Yuichi Nakamura (COTW) (Japanese); Brett Calo (COTW) (English)

Kain R. Heinlein (カイン・R・ハインライン, Kain R Hainrain) is Rock Howard's maternal uncle, being the younger brother of Rock's mother Marie Heinlein. Having grown up in poverty and surrounded by violence, he sought power and rose up the ranks of Second Southtown's criminal underworld. After learning of Geese Howard's death, he began planning to secede Second Southtown from the United States, turning it into an independent city-state. He appears as the final boss of Garou: Mark of the Wolves, in which he hosts the King of Fighters Maximum Mayhem tournament to draw out Rock, planning to use him to obtain his father Geese's legacy and gain the resources needed to accomplish his goals. By the time of City of the Wolves, Kain has nearly succeeded in gaining Second Southtown's independence, bringing nearly all of its criminal organizations under his control. He also learns that Marie is being held hostage by Mr. Big, who demands Geese's legacy in exchange. With help from Rock, Grant, and Billy Kane, Kain succeeds in negotiating with Big for Marie's safety and retrieving the legacy, and Second Southtown becomes independent.

=== Kevin Rian ===
Voiced by: Yō Kitazawa (MOTW), Akihiro Sakata (COTW) (Japanese); Jonah Scott (COTW) (English)

Kevin Rian (ケビン・ライアン, Kebin Raian) is a high-spirited SWAT officer stationed in Second Southtown, with a nearly flawless arrest record. After his partner and best friend is murdered by Freeman, he enters the Maximum Mayhem tournament in hopes of finding his killer. He is cheered on in his fights by Marky, his partner's young son whom he adopts after his death. He fights using Sambo, similar to his distant relative Blue Mary, although much of his fighting style revolves more around direct strikes than grappling. Kevin returns in City of the Wolves under orders to confiscate Geese's legacy, and agrees due to his belief that Freeman will be entering the King of Fighters tournament. While Kevin is distracted fighting Fallen Rock, Freeman takes Mary and Marky hostage. Before he can kill them, they are rescued by Terry and Kevin, who successfully subdues and arrests Freeman.

=== Kim Dong-Hwan ===
Voiced by: Jun Hashimoto (MOTW), Eiji Takeuchi (COTW) (Japanese); Jerron Bacat (COTW) (English)

Kim Dong-Hwan (キム・ドンファン, Kimu Donfan), sometimes written as 김동환 (Kim Dong-hwan), was taught Taekwondo by his father, Kim Kaphwan, using techniques infused with lightning, and has a friendly rivalry with his younger brother Kim Jae-Hoon. He is more of a show-off and slacker than his brother, relying more on aerial attacks and juggles (i.e. attacks that strike the opponent into the air uncontrollably). He believes he is a "genius" in the story, and doesn't need to study diligently in order to master Taekwondo, but his father and brother see it differently. In City of the Wolves, Dong-Hwan loses a battle with his father, realizing his inexperience despite his innate talent, and enters the King of Fighters tournament to prove himself.

=== Kim Jae-Hoon ===
Voiced by: Hiroki Asakawa (MOTW), Shunichi Toki (COTW) (Japanese); Howard Yang (COTW) (English)

Kim Jae-Hoon (キム・ジェイフン, Kimu Jeifun), sometimes written as 김재훈 (Kim Jae-hoon), was taught Taekwondo by his father, Kim Kaphwan, using techniques infused with fire, and is a brother of Dong Hwan's. Jae-Hoon admires his father, so he fights more like him than Dong-Hwan does, with a combination of high and low attacks with plenty of power behind them. Like his father, he has a strong sense of justice and chivalry, but unlike his brother, he establishes his strength through constant practice. Jae-Hoon returns as downloadable content in City of the Wolves, where his father, Kaphwan still praises his performance, having figured out his weakness happens to be his strength as well.

=== Marco Rodrigues ===
Voiced by: Hikaru Hanada (MOTW), Kenichirou Matsuda (COTW) (Japanese); Earl Baylon (COTW) (English)

Marco Rodrigues (マルコ・ロドリゲス, Maruko Rodorigesu) is a Brazilian Kyokugen-style karate expert, who trained under Ryo Sakazaki. He leads a somewhat austere life in a wooded area on the outskirts of town, and fights using powerful, deliberate attacks. He enters the Maximum Mayhem tournament to help promote Kyokogenryu and lure new students to his dojo. In City of the Wolves, he is forced to train at Yuri Sakazaki's fitness club due to his dojo's sign being stolen by Vox Reaper, and enters the King of Fighters tournament to reclaim it and rebuild his dojo's reputation. Just like Ryo, he has several famous moves from Art of Fighting with some of his own derivatives.

Marco was renamed Khushnood Butt in the U.S. release of Garou: Mark of the Wolves, possibly to avoid confusion with mixed martial artist Ricco Rodriguez; the character's name would be reverted to Marco in future localizations beginning in The King of Fighters XV (2022).

=== Tizoc / King of Dinosaurs ===
Voiced by: Hikaru Hanada (Japanese); Jalen K. Cassell (COTW) (English)

Tizoc, otherwise known as Griffon Mask (グリフォンマスク, Gurifon Masuku) or the Griffon in the Japanese version, is a character from both the Fatal Fury and King of Fighters series. He started out in the Fatal Fury game Garou: Mark of the Wolves and is described as being a well-renowned and popular professional wrestler. By the time of Garou: Mark of The Wolves, Tizoc already sees himself as a washed up has-been due to a serious loss against Vox Reaper, and enters the Maximum Mayhem tournament in order to regain his passion for wrestling. In City of the Wolves, Tizoc enters the new tournament for the sake of a young fan with a leg injury. He defeats Vox in a rematch, but suffers an injury that forces him into rehab for months before returning to the ring with the fan's encouragement.

When the events of King of Fighters 2003 occur, Tizoc is an up-and-coming superstar in the professional wrestling circuit and joins the Fatal Fury team after being invited by Terry Bogard himself after his brother Andy becomes unavailable since he is teaching the young Hokutomaru in Shiranui style ninjutsu in Japan. In The King of Fighters XI, Tizoc join force with B. Jenet and Gato to form Garou team. In The King of Fighters XIV, Tizoc returns with Team Mexico (Ángel and Ramon) under a new "heel" gimmick, King of Dinosaurs. Although "King of Dinosaurs" repeatedly denies being Tizoc and artist Eisuke Ogura claimed before XIV's release that they are not the same character, the obviousness of his new identity is a recurring joke throughout the game; some characters (such as Terry Bogard) immediately recognize Tizoc as King of Dinosaurs, while others who are less aware don't take him seriously. Team Mexico's ending reveals that Tizoc took up the King of Dinosaurs gimmick to avenge a humiliating defeat by Nelson and requested help from Ángel and Ramon to cover up his former identity. In The King of Fighters XV, King of Dinosaurs and Ramón team up with former KOF XIV tournament host Antonov to form the new wrestling team named "Team G.A.W. (Galaxy Anton Wrestling)", while Rock Howard replaces him as a new third member of Garou team to accompany both Gato and Jenet.

== Introduced in City of the Wolves ==
=== Preecha ===
Voiced by: Chika Anzai (Japanese); Mia Paige (English)

Preecha (プリチャ, Puricha) is an aspiring academic who becomes fascinated by Joe Higashi's ability to manifest supernatural phenomena with his fighting style. Eager to provide scientific explanation for these abilities, she becomes his student and joins the King of Fighters tournament to similarly study her opponents' techniques. Like Joe, she uses a Muay Thai-based fighting style.

=== Vox Reaper ===
Voiced by: Toshiyuki Toyonaga (Japanese); Erik Ransom (English)

Vox Reaper (ボックス・リーパー, Bokkusu Rīpā) is a karate fighter and street assassin. Following a failed assassination attempt on Kain R. Heinlein, Kain's bodyguard Grant sees potential in Vox and takes him on as an apprentice. At Grant's request, Vox becomes Kain's new bodyguard, taking on his duties and inheriting his mask after Grant passes away.

== Reception ==
The characters from Fatal Fury have received major positive reaction with GamesRadar calling Terry Bogard as "one of SNK's most memorable characters", as 86th "most memorable, influential, and badass" protagonist in games. IGN praised the increase of the series' cast but heavily criticized the final boss Geese Howard for his high difficulty. Avi Krebs from GamingExcellence.com commented that Billy Kane is one of the hardest boss characters from the first Fatal Fury, but he remains "pale" in comparison to Geese. Kotaku's Patricia Hernandez wrote "one of Fatal Fury 2's biggest contributions to the medium was that it was the first game to introduce a character with breasts that moved on their own. Known as Mai Shiranui, that character is famed for having very, uh, lively breasts. Though Fatal Fury may not be a huge franchise nowadays, its legacy is very much alive: many top fighting games include a similar jiggle effect". While acknowledging that Fatal Fury fans might be disappointed by the reduced roster of fighters in Fatal Fury 3, GamePro praised the new third fighting plane and ranking system, and concluded that "instead of simply adding more fighters, FF3 does more with fewer fighters (hidden moves and so on) and a unique method of gameplay". They remarked that Bob and Franco are "uninteresting" new characters but praising and the modifications to Mai Shiranui's Swan Dive attack. The cast of Garou was praised for their animations which was compared with the ones from Marvel vs. Capcom 2.

THEM Anime Reviews criticized the characterization of the main characters in the three films citing them as "one-dimensional" and also the villains. On the other hand, Anime News Network's Bamboo Dong enjoyed the portrayal of the characters in the films, particularly praising Terry's character development as "most adaptations of this nature barely let their characters show any weaknesses at all, much less an extended period of insecurity and despair, so it was pretty compelling seeing Terry's journey through his dark period". In another review, Dong praised the selection of the main characters. Chris Beveridge from Mania Beyond Entertainment also praised the development of the characters such as the interactions between the couple of Andy Bogard and Mai Shiranui as well as the grief of Terry over the loss of his girlfriend.
