= Fatal Fury 2: The New Battle =

1993 anime television special

- Promotional poster
- Based on: Fatal Fury 2 by SNK
- Screenplay by: Takashi Yamada
- Directed by: Kazuhiro Furuhashi
- Voices of: Hirotaka Suzuoki; Masami Kikuchi; Kazukiyo Nishikiori; Keiichi Nanba; Nobuyuki Hiyama; Kotono Mitsuishi; Daiki Nakamura; Jōji Yanami; Kōji Totani; Hidekatsu Shibata; Kōji Yada; Hisao Egawa; Kikuko Inoue
- Music by: Toshihiko Sahashi
- Country of origin: Japan
- Original language: Japanese

Production
- Producers: Yoshihiro Suzuki; Tatsuji Yamazaki; Hiromichi Mogaki
- Cinematography: Seiichi Morishita
- Editors: Hajime Okayasu; Toshihiko Kojima; Hideaki Murai; Yumiko Nakaba; Akihiro Kawasaki; Kiyotaka Miyake
- Running time: 75 minutes
- Production companies: Nihon Ad Systems; Studio Comet

Original release
- Network: Fuji TV
- Release: July 31, 1993

Fatal Fury 2: The New Battle (Note: Known in Japan as Battle Fighters Garō Densetsu 2 (バトルファイターズ 餓狼伝説2, Batoru Faitāzu Garō Densetsu Tsu; lit. Battle Fighters: Legend of the Hungry Wolf 2)) is a 1993 anime television special based on the Neo Geo SNK video game Fatal Fury 2, and is a sequel to the 1992 television film Fatal Fury: Legend of the Hungry Wolf. The special was directed by Kazuhiro Furuhashi and once again features character designs by Masami Ōbari. It originally aired on Fuji TV on July 31, 1993. An English adaptation produced by Viz Communications was released on home video in 1994.

== Plot ==
A German nobleman named Wolfgang Krauser tracks down his half-brother, Geese Howard, who has isolated himself in the mountains while recovering after his previous defeat. Krauser learns the name of the man who defeated Geese, Terry Bogard, and decides to challenge him to prove his superiority. Elsewhere, Terry meets up with a young boy named Tony who asks to be his disciple, but Terry refuses. After a sparring match with Kim Kaphwan, Terry is found by Krauser and fights him, but loses due to an injury from his battle with Kim. Krauser tells him to recover and meet him in Germany at Stroheim Castle for a rematch.

Terry wakes up in Tony's home and learns that he was taken care of by Tony's mother, Elza, who does not want Tony to emulate Terry's violent activities and demands that he leave. Later, Tony notices Terry at the train station and asks him to stay, but Terry refuses and forbids Tony to follow him, though Tony does so anyway without his knowledge. Tony attempts to help Terry prepare for his next fight with Krauser, but Terry believes he cannot win and falls into a deep depression, developing a drinking problem.

In Japan, Mai Shiranui visits the dojo where Jubei Yamada and Andy Bogard are training, wanting to see Andy. Joe Higashi also arrives to inform Andy of Terry's defeat. Later that night, Jubei informs Andy and Joe of Krauser's origins as the "Emperor of Darkness" and heir of the powerful Stroheim family, having scarred Geese and killed his own father as a teenager. Jubei warns them not to get involved, but Andy refuses and leaves with Joe to seek revenge. Jubei asks Mai, who had been eavesdropping, to accompany them.

Terry is later arrested for assault after beating up some street punks who attempted to rob him. Joe posts Terry's bail, but is ashamed to see him in his state and leaves him to his own devices. Tony remains determined to help Terry out of his drunken depression. In Germany, Andy and Mai try to find Krauser, but learn that he is out of the country. Mai is attacked by Laurence Blood, Krauser's right-hand man, who takes her captive to prevent them from finding Krauser, but she is rescued by Andy.

At a bar, Terry is challenged by Axel Hawk, but Tony ends up fighting Hawk's sparring partner, refusing to give up, despite being badly beaten. Seeing Tony's determination inspires Terry, who regains his confidence and defeats Hawk. Ready to challenge Krauser again, Terry learns that Joe challenged Krauser to get revenge for him, only to lose and be brutally injured with several broken bones. Visiting him at the hospital, Terry learns from Joe and Mai that Andy is waiting for him by their father's grave. There, Andy challenges Terry for the right to fight Krauser, with Terry emerging victorious thanks to a new technique, the Power Geyser.

The next day, Terry challenges Krauser at Stroheim Castle. After a fierce battle, Terry narrowly defeats Krauser, who congratulates Terry and throws himself from a damaged wall to his death. Geese learns of Krauser's defeat and begins plotting his own return. Later, Terry reunites Tony with his mother. Tony promises he will become a great martial artist like Terry someday, and Terry gifts him his cap before departing.

== Voice cast ==
Character	Japanese voice actor	English voice actor
Terry Bogard	Kazukiyo Nishikiori	Mark Hildreth
Andy Bogard	Keiichi Nanba	Peter Wilds
Joe Higashi	Nobuyuki Hiyama	Jason Gray-Stanford; George Peter (2021 Blu-ray)
Tony	Masami Kikuchi	Tony Sampson
Mai Shiranui	Kotono Mitsuishi	Sarah Sawatsky
Jubei Yamada	Jōji Yanami	French Tickner
Wolfgang Krauser	Hirotaka Suzuoki	Paul Dobson
Geese Howard	Hidekatsu Shibata	Ward Perry
Kim Kaphwan	Daiki Nakamura	David Kaye
Tung Fu Rue	Kōji Yada	Mina Mina
Lily McGuire	Kikuko Inoue	Willow Johnson
Axel Hawk	Hirohiko Kakegawa	Michael Dobson
Laurence Blood	Kōji Totani	Ward Perry
Big Bear	Hisao Egawa	Earl Fisher (2021 Blu-ray)

== Release ==
Fatal Fury 2: The New Battle originally aired on Fuji TV on July 31, 1993. An English-language adaptation produced by Viz Communications was released on home video in North America in 1994.

In 2021, Discotek Media released the special on Blu-ray alongside Fatal Fury: Legend of the Hungry Wolf. The release was newly scanned from the original film negatives and restored a scene that had been omitted from the earlier English-language version; the scene was newly translated and dubbed. The Blu-ray also included corrected subtitles and both the original Japanese and US credit sequences.
