= Real Bout Fatal Fury Special =

1997 fighting game by SNK

- Arcade flyer
- Developers: SNK; Gaibrain (GB); Yumekobo (SS, PS)
- Publishers: SNK; Takara (GB)
- Producers: Hiroshi Matsumoto; Seigo Ito; Takashi Nishiyama
- Designers: Takahisa Yariyama; Takashi Tsukamoto
- Programmer: Naoyan Apchiba
- Artists: N. Kuroki; Takehiro Isaji; Y. Ashizawa
- Composers: Akihiro Uchida; Kazuhiro Nishida; Kyoko Naka
- Series: Fatal Fury
- Platforms: Arcade, Game Boy, Neo Geo AES, Neo Geo CD, PlayStation, Sega Saturn
- Release: January 28, 1997: Arcade; WW: January 28, 1997 Neo Geo AES; WW: February 28, 1997 Neo Geo CD; WW: March 30, 1997 Saturn; JP: December 23, 1997 Game Boy; JP: March 27, 1998 PlayStation; JP: June 25, 1998
- Genre: Fighting
- Modes: Single-player, multiplayer
- Arcade system: Neo Geo MVS

Real Bout Fatal Fury Special (Note: Known in Japan as Real Bout Garō Densetsu Special (Japanese: リアルバウト餓狼伝説SPECIAL, Hepburn: Rearu Bauto Garō Densetsu Special; lit. Real Bout Hungry Wolf Legend Special)) is a 1997 fighting game developed and published by SNK for the Neo Geo arcade and home platforms. It is the sixth installment in the Fatal Fury series and the second game in the Real Bout sub-series, following Real Bout Fatal Fury (1995). The game features entirely new graphics and returns to the two-level plane system from Fatal Fury 2.

In Japan, it was ported in 1998 to the Sega Saturn and as an updated version, Real Bout Special: Dominated Mind, to the PlayStation, and as the eighth installment. A Game Boy version was published by Takara in Japan. Real Bout Fatal Fury Special was included in the Fatal Fury Battle Archives Vol. 2 compilation in February 2007 for the PlayStation 2, which was made available in North America. The compilation was re-released in March 2017 on the PlayStation Store for PlayStation 4. Hamster Corporation re-released the game as part of their ACA Neo Geo series for the PlayStation 4, Xbox One, Nintendo Switch, Windows, Android and iOS.

== Gameplay ==
Gameplay screenshot showcasing a match between Terry Bogard and Blue Mary

Though gameplay is two-dimensional, characters can move between two different planes during battle. Breaking an opponent through one of the barriers located on either side of a stage causes the opponent to become stunned.

== Characters ==
The game retains the cast of the original Real Bout, with the addition of Tung Fu Rue, Cheng Sinzan, Laurence Blood, and Wolfgang Krauser from Fatal Fury Special. Krauser serves as the new final boss. Geese Howard, who was canonically killed off in his own KOF tournament during the previous game, appears in this game as a hidden final boss in a special "Nightmare Match" and as an unlockable playable character in the home versions. The game also features hidden "extra" versions of Andy Bogard, Billy Kane, Blue Mary, and Tung Fu Rue for a total of 23 characters (24 if Geese is counted).

== Development and release ==
The game was ported to the Neo Geo CD with several additions, such as a Versus mode and a music video starring Blue Mary that is shown after the credits when Arcade mode is completed. This port also saw a release for the Sega Saturn, using the 1MB RAM cartridge expansion of the system to retain sprite animations.

=== Real Bout Special: Dominated Mind ===
A port of Real Bout Special titled Real Bout Special: Dominated Mind was released for the PlayStation in 1998 only in Japan. It adds Alfred from Real Bout Fatal Fury 2 (which was released three months earlier on the Neo Geo) as a playable character and includes a new boss character named White (modeled after the character Alexander "Alex" DeLarge from A Clockwork Orange). This port adds animated videos produced by Sunrise for the game's intro and character endings. The story of this version centers around White's brainwashing of Billy Kane and attempted takeover of Southtown's underworld in the power vacuum left by Geese Howard's death in the original Real Bout. In this version, Geese sports a halo over his head, a reference to his passing in the original Real Bout. Dominated Mind also features new moves, hidden unlockable super moves, and super cancelling (known in the game as "Final Impacts") and removed the two-line battle system from the game. Extra versions of Andy, Billy, Mary, and Tung are removed, with the regular Mary dons her EX counterpart's color palettes for this game.

=== Nettou Real Bout Garou Densetsu Special ===
The Game Boy version, titled Nettou Real Bout Garou Densetsu Special (熱闘リアルバウト餓狼伝説SPECIAL), was released only in Japan on March 27, 1998, featuring simplified graphics and two-button gameplay. This version features only 12 playable characters: a roster which consists of Terry Bogard, Andy Bogard, Joe Higashi, Mai Shiranui, Blue Mary, Duck King, Kim Kaphwan, Jin Chonrei, Billy Kane, Ryuji Yamazaki, Laurence Blood, and Wolfgang Krauser. Geese Howard appears as a hidden character, as well as Iori Yagami from The King of Fighters series.

== Reception ==
Reception

Review score
Publication	Score
Dengeki PlayStation	85/100, 80/100

In Japan, Game Machine listed Real Bout Fatal Fury Special on their March 1, 1997 issue as being the most-successful arcade game of the month. The game was a success in the arcades. According to Famitsu, the AES and Neo Geo CD versions sold over 9,169 and 20,246 copies in their first week on the market respectively.
