= Fatal Fury: First Contact =

1999 video game

- Developer: SNK
- Publisher: SNK
- Series: Fatal Fury
- Platforms: Neo Geo Pocket Color, Nintendo Switch
- Release: Neo Geo Pocket Color: NA: May 1999; JP: 27 May 1999; UK: 1 October 1999; Nintendo Switch; 23 December 2020
- Genre: Fighting
- Modes: Single-player, multiplayer

Fatal Fury: First Contact is a fighting game released by SNK in May 1999 for the Neo Geo Pocket Color handheld system. It is part of the Fatal Fury series, and is loosely based on Real Bout Fatal Fury 2: The Newcomers. The game was later re-released as part of Neo Geo Pocket Color Selection Vol. 1 in 2021.

== Gameplay ==
The game has 13 playable characters. Two-player multiplayer is supported via a link cable.

=== Characters ===
- Alfred
- Andy Bogard
- Billy Kane
- Geese Howard
- Joe Higashi
- Kim Kaphwan
- Lao (Note: Versus mode only)
- Li Xiangfei
- Mai Shiranui
- Rick Strowd
- Ryuji Yamazaki
- Terry Bogard
- Wolfgang Krauser

== Reception ==
Reception

Aggregate score
Aggregator	Score
Metacritic	62/100 (Switch)

Review scores
Publication	Score
GameSpot	7.0/10 (NGPC)
IGN	7.0/10 (NGPC)
Nintendo Life	7/10 (Switch)
Nintendo World Report	6/10 (Switch)
Digitally Downloaded	3/5 (Switch)

IGN stated that First Contact was a quality game while unfavorably comparing it to King of Fighters R-2 or Samurai Shodown! 2. GameSpot praised the quality of the title's graphics but similarly compared it unfavorably to King of Fighters R-2. Hardcore Gaming 101 stated that the title was "among the best portable fighters ever made". Nintendo Life called the Switch port "accessible and charming" while stating that there were better alternatives available for the system. Nintendo World Report complimented the graphics but criticized the lack of extras compared to the other Neo Geo Pocket Color fighting games. Hardcore Gamer wrote that the game "[...] plays like a dream still and while its graphics don't hold up as well as the other NGPC games due to a lack of background activity, its core action does." Siliconera called First Contact a "fun pocket-sized fighter".
