= Fatal Fury: Wild Ambition =

1999 video game

- Developers: SNK; Japan Vistec
- Publisher: SNK
- Director: Junichi Yoshizawa
- Producers: Hiroshi Matsumoto; Seigo Ito; Mitsuharu Inoue
- Designers: Hironori Iriuchi; Masaharu Kouno; Yukihiro Higashi; M. Ohmori
- Artists: Kazuyuki Shibata; Koichi Noda; Koichi Sakita
- Series: Fatal Fury
- Platforms: Arcade, PlayStation
- Release: Arcade: JP: January 28, 1999; PlayStation: JP: June 24, 1999; NA: November 30, 1999
- Genre: Fighting game
- Modes: Single-player, multiplayer
- Arcade system: Hyper Neo Geo 64

Fatal Fury: Wild Ambition (Note: Known in Japan as Garō Densetsu: Wild Ambition (餓狼伝説 ワイルドアンビション, Garō Densetsu Wairudo Anbishon; lit. Legend of the Hungry Wolf: Wild Ambition)) is a 1999 fighting video game developed and published by SNK for Japanese arcades on January 28, 1999. It is the ninth installment of the Fatal Fury series of fighting games and was one of the last games released for the Hyper Neo Geo 64 system board. It was ported to the Sony PlayStation on June 24 in Japan and November 30 in North America, making it the only Hyper Neo Geo 64 game to receive a port for a home system. The game was re-released as a downloadable game for PlayStation 3 and PlayStation Portable via the PlayStation Network in Japan on April 25, 2007.

The game re-tells the story of the original Fatal Fury video game. It introduces Toji Sakata and Tsugumi Sendo to the series, and places Mai Shiranui, Kim Kaphwan, and Li Xiangfei as participants of the original King of Fighters tournament. Ryuji Yamazaki also appears as a mid-boss character and Ryo Sakazaki makes an appearance as Mr. Karate, tying the events of Art of Fighting 2 to this game.

== Gameplay ==
Fatal Fury: Wild Ambition is a 3D fighting game, although the gameplay is similar to that of a 2D fighting game. The button layout for controls are similar to Real Bout Fatal Fury 2, but includes a new move called the Axis Shift. This feature allows players to move their characters left or right using 3D movement. Characters attack using punches, kicks and heavy attacks. Every character also has an assortment of Special Moves and Desperation Moves (now called Super Power Attacks). Super Power Attacks can be performed only when the player's Health Meter is flashing red and does not use the Heat Meter.

Much like in Real Bout Fatal Fury 2, players are able to perform throws, counterattacks and pursuit attacks; they can also taunt and recover quickly after being knocked out.

Fatal Fury: Wild Ambition replaces the Power Meter from Real Bout Fatal Fury 2 with the Heat Meter. The Heat Meter starts at 50% full at the beginning of every match, although it can change between rounds of the same match. Players fill the meter by attacking or taunting their opponent, but taking damage or being thrown decreases the gauge. If a player takes damage but their opponent stops attacking them, the meter will rise to 50% again. When the player fills the Heat Meter, the message "MAX OK" will appear. Players may then perform an Overdrive Power or a Heat Blow. The Heat Meter will be close to empty if either move is used; this can also happen if the player takes too much damage or performs numerous counterattacks. If this happens, a Danger message will appear. If a player takes too much damage with a nearly empty Heat Meter, the player will overheat. This causes the player to get dizzy, becoming vulnerable to the opponent's attack.

A new feature introduced in Fatal Fury: Wild Ambition allows a player to block an attack at the moment it hits, which causes no damage, while the offensive opponent is pushed away.

A novel attack introduced in Fatal Fury: Wild Ambition is the unblockable Heat Blow. A player may stun or launch the opponent into the air and then perform a Heat Blow while being attacked by the opponent to interrupt their attacks. Using a Heat Blow decreases the Heat Meter when the user is close to Danger state.

Fatal Fury: Wild Ambition changes Potential Power (shortened to P. Power in-game) attacks and renames them Overdrive Power. Overdrive Power attacks work differently from the P. Power attacks of the old games. The player can perform Overdrive Power attacks once the Heat Meter is full, regardless of how much health the player has. Using Overdrive Power decreases the Heat Meter close to the Danger point.

== Characters ==
Wild Ambition features 10 playable characters in its arcade roster, plus two hidden characters. These characters were made available by default in the PlayStation version, which added two additional secret characters for a total of 14. New characters first introduced in Wild Ambition are marked in bold.

- Andy Bogard
- Billy Kane
- Duck King (Note: Secret character added to PlayStation version)
- Geese Howard (Note: Secret character in arcade version) (Note: Boss character)
- Joe Higashi
- Li Xiangfei
- Kim Kaphwan
- Mai Shiranui
- Mr. Karate
- Raiden
- Ryuji Yamazaki
- Terry Bogard
- **Toji Sakata**
- **Tsugumi Sendo**

== Reception ==
Reception

Aggregate score
Aggregator	Score
GameRankings	50%

Review scores
Publication	Score
AllGame	2/5
Electronic Gaming Monthly	5.375/10
Famitsu	25/40
Game Informer	3.75/10
GamePro	3.5/5
GameSpot	6.1/10
IGN	4/10
Official U.S. PlayStation Magazine	1.5/5

The PlayStation version received mixed reviews according to the review aggregation website GameRankings. In Japan, Famitsu gave it a score of 25 out of 40. Also in Japan, Game Machine listed the arcade version in their March 15, 1999 issue as being the third most-successful arcade game of the month.
