= Real Bout Fatal Fury 2: The Newcomers =

1998 video game

- Developer: SNK
- Publisher: SNK
- Producers: Hiroshi Matsumoto; Seigo Ito; Takashi Nishiyama
- Designers: Takahisa Yariyama; Takashi Tsukamoto
- Artists: Eisuke Ogura; Nobuyuki Kuroki; Y. Ashizawa
- Composers: Hideki Asanaka; Yoshihiko Wada
- Series: Fatal Fury
- Platforms: Arcade, Neo Geo AES, Neo Geo CD, Windows
- Release: Arcade: JP/NA: March 20, 1998; Neo Geo AES: JP/NA: April 29, 1998; Neo Geo CD: JP: July 23, 1998; Windows: WW: September 28, 2025
- Genre: Fighting
- Modes: Single-player, multiplayer
- Arcade system: Neo Geo MVS

Real Bout Fatal Fury 2: The Newcomers (Note: Also known as Real Bout Hungry Wolf Legend 2: The Newcomers (Japanese: リアルバウト餓狼伝説2 THE NEWCOMERS, Hepburn: Rearu Bauto Garō Densetsu Tsū: Za Nyūkamāzu) in Japan.) is a 1998 fighting game developed and published by SNK for the Neo Geo arcade and home platforms. It is the fifth mainline installment in the Fatal Fury series.

The game uses the same graphics as Real Bout Fatal Fury Special and its update Real Bout Fatal Fury Special: Dominated Mind, but returns to the same fighting system from the original Real Bout Fatal Fury. The game was included in Fatal Fury Battle Archives Vol. 2 compilation released in February 2007 for the PlayStation 2. In March 2017, the compilation was re-released in the PlayStation Store on PlayStation 4. Hamster Corporation re-released the game as part of their ACA Neo Geo series for the PlayStation 4, Xbox One, Nintendo Switch, Windows, Android and iOS.

== Gameplay ==
Gameplay screenshot showcasing a match between Li Xiangfei and Rick Strowd

Real Bout Fatal Fury 2 revamps the two-lane battle system from Real Bout Special. Instead of fighting in either two lanes, the player is now forced to fight in a main lane, while the second lane is a "sway lane" used to avoid attacks (similar to the original Real Bout). The one-lane trap stages, last seen in Fatal Fury Special, also return.

== Characters ==
The character roster from Real Bout Special returns, including Geese Howard, who is now a normally selectable character, and serves as one of the standard final bosses, alternating with Wolfgang Krauser. However, the extra versions of Andy, Billy, Mary, and Tung are gone. Two new characters are introduced: Li Xiangfei, a Chinese-American waitress; and Rick Strowd, a Native American boxer. The game also features biplane pilot Alfred (who would later be the protagonist of Real Bout Fatal Fury Special: Dominated Mind, the PlayStation version of Real Bout Special) as a secret final boss.

== Development ==
The game was exhibited at the February 1998 AOU Show.

== Release ==
The game was first released in Japan and North America for the Neo Geo MVS arcade system on March 20, 1998, followed by the Neo Geo AES home system on April 29, 1998. It was among the first games to take advantage of the "Neo Giga" upgrade for greater cartridge size, using 600 megabits. In Japan, the game was also released for the Neo Geo CD on July 23, 1998.

Real Bout 2 is also included in the compilation Fatal Fury: Battle Archives Vol. 2 for the PlayStation 2; this version includes Alfred as a playable character.

The Neo Geo version was ported to the Wii Virtual Console in Japan on June 19, 2012 and in Europe on October 4, 2012. In North America, Nintendo accidentally set the release date of March 27, 2008 on the official game page at the Nintendo site when the game was released on September 27, 2008.

Fatal Fury: First Contact, a game loosely based on Real Bout 2, was released for the Neo Geo Pocket Color in 1999. This version adds a new character named Lao, who is only playable in the game's Versus mode, while removing half the characters from the arcade release.

On September 28, 2025, a definitive version of the game was released for PCs and distributed through the Steam marketplace, as a part of the Neo Geo Premium Selection by Code Mystics. This version features online play with rollback netcode, practice mode and gallery mode.

== Reception ==
In Japan, Game Machine listed Real Bout Fatal Fury 2: The Newcomers as the most popular arcade game of April 1998. According to Famitsu, the Neo Geo CD version sold over 11,821 copies in its first week on the market.
