= Fatal Fury 3: Road to the Final Victory =

1995 video game

- North American arcade flyer
- Developer: SNK (Note: Saturn version developed by SIMS; Windows version developed by Kinesoft with additional work by NuFX and WizardWords.)
- Publishers: SNK: Windows; JP: GameBank; NA: CyberFront Corporation
- Producers: Hiroshi Matsumoto; Takashi Nishiyama
- Designers: Takashi Tsukamoto; Takahisa Yariyama
- Programmers: Hideki Miyagami; Yasushi Gushiken
- Artists: Higashi Pon; Eiko Chang; Ema Sue
- Composers: Masahiko Hataya; Toshio Shimizu; Yoshihiko Kitamura
- Series: Fatal Fury
- Platforms: Arcade, Neo Geo AES, Neo Geo CD, Sega Saturn, Windows
- Release: March 27, 1995: Arcade; JP: March 27, 1995; NA: July 1995 Neo Geo AES; WW: April 21, 1995 Neo Geo CD; JP: April 28, 1995; NA: October 1996 Saturn; JP: June 28, 1996 Windows; JP: September 19, 1996; NA: 1998
- Genre: Fighting
- Modes: Single-player, multiplayer
- Arcade system: Neo Geo MVS

Fatal Fury 3: Road to the Final Victory (Note: Also known as Hungry Wolf Legend 3: The Distant Battle (Japanese: 餓狼伝説3 遥かなる闘い, Hepburn: Garō Densetsu 3: Harukanaru Tatakai) in Japan.) is a 1995 fighting game developed and published by SNK for the Neo Geo arcade and home platforms. It is the third mainline game in the Fatal Fury series and the fourth game overall, after 1993's Fatal Fury Special, which was an updated version of 1992's Fatal Fury 2. Console versions of Fatal Fury 3 were released for the Neo Geo CD, Sega Saturn, Windows-based computers and on the Wii Virtual Console. The game is also included in the compilation Fatal Fury Battle Archives Volume 1 for the PlayStation 2. Hamster Corporation re-released the game as part of their ACA Neo Geo series for the PlayStation 4, Xbox One, Nintendo Switch, Windows, Android and iOS.

== Gameplay ==
Gameplay screenshot showcasing a match between Terry Bogard and Blue Mary

Fatal Fury 3 retains the format and controls of the previous game in the series, Fatal Fury Special. However, the two-plane battle stages have been revamped into a three-plane format known as the Oversway System. The player fights primarily in the middle plane or the main plane, but can move or "oversway" into either of the sway lines at the background (LP+LK) or foreground (LK+HP). When the player performs an attack in a sway plane (or an Oversway Attack), their character will return to the main plane. Likewise, the player can attack an opponent who is in a Sway Plane with an Anti-Oversway Attack. The player can also do a "Quick Sway" to avoid an attack, leaving the opponent vulnerable to a regular attack.

Other new techniques introduced in this installment includes controlling the height of the character's jump, block an opponent's attack at mid-air (Air Guard), and a new type of combo techniques known as Combination Arts, allowing the player to cancel a specific series (which varies between characters) of regular attacks from one to the other. In addition to the regular Special Moves, and the Super Special Moves which can only be performed when the life gauge is flashing red, each character also has a "Hidden Ability", which is a stronger version of a Super Special Move. A Hidden Ability occurs once in every 1024 chances whenever the player inputs the command for the character's Super Special Move. A Hidden Ability can also be used by activating "Super Mode" before a match using a secret code. The player then enters a specific command for the Hidden Ability when the life gauge is flashing red. Unlike Super Special Moves, a Hidden Ability can only be used once per round.

Fatal Fury 3 also features a Fighting Level system when fighting against the computer. When the player completes a round, their performance is graded from E to S. The final opponents the player faces at the end of the Single Player Mode is determined then by the player's average.

The player will have a choice among four characters as their first opponent (Joe, Mary, Bob, and Franco). After the first four opponents are defeated, the player will fight against Ryuji Yamazaki for a plot-based match in which the player must win only one round. The player will then proceed to fight against Mai, Andy, Hon-Fu, Sokaku, Terry, and Geese, in that order, before fighting Yamazaki again for a full match. Depending on the grade average, the game will either end against Yamazaki, or the player will fight against either, or both, of the Jin twins, starting with Chon Shu and ending with Chon Rei.

== Plot ==
Two years have passed since Terry Bogard had defeated Wolfgang Krauser and won the "King of Fighters: World Wide" tournament. Ever since then, Terry has traveled throughout the world, meeting new friends and battling many opponents along the way. Upon returning home to South Town, Terry rendezvouses with his young brother Andy and his good friends Joe and Mai at the grand opening of the Pao Pao Cafe 2 that's being headed by Richard Meyer and his capoeira apprentice Bob Wilson. During the opening, Joe explains to Terry a disturbing rumor that he had gotten from Cheng Sinzan via a private message in that Geese Howard is supposedly alive, having survived his fatal fall from his personal tower four years prior and faking his death to the public so that he could slowly recover in secret and plan his revenge against Terry, who had defeated him in the "King of Fighters: South Town" tournament. Upon hearing and learning of this, Terry and his friends set out to confirm on whether or not Geese is still alive, not knowing that their personal investigation is only a small part of a bigger threat which involves a dangerous Japanese criminal, two young Chinese orphans, and three sacred scrolls that could easily endanger South Town and the rest of the world.

== Fighters ==
Returning fighters:

- Terry Bogard
- Andy Bogard
- Joe Higashi
- Mai Shiranui
- Geese Howard

New fighters:

- Sokaku Mochizuki - a Japanese Buddhist monk whose clan are the sworn enemies of the Shiranui school.
- Bob Wilson - a capoeira master from Brazil who is employed as a waiter by Richard Meyer.
- Hon-Fu - a nunchaku-wielding cop from Hong Kong who has come to South Town in order to find and arrest Yamazaki.
- Blue Mary - a blonde-haired female agent who uses combat sambo and is Terry's love interest.
- Franco Bash - an Italian American kickboxer who is fighting to rescue and save his kidnapped young son from Yamazaki.

Bosses:

- Ryuji Yamazaki - a dangerous Japanese criminal who fights with one hand in his pocket.
- Jin Chonshu - a young Chinese orphan boy who is seeking the Sacred Scrolls of the Jin.
- Jin Chonrei - Chonshu's elder twin brother, who aids his young twin brother as both his personal protector and bodyguard.

== Reception ==
In Japan, Game Machine listed Fatal Fury 3: Road to the Final Victory as the second most popular arcade game of April 1995. According to Famitsu, the AES version sold over 34,810 copies in its first week on the market.

On release, Famicom Tsūshin scored the Neo Geo version of the game a 32 out of 40. The four reviewers of Electronic Gaming Monthly scored it a 7.675 out of 10. They had widely varied reactions to the game, and two of them remarked that it lacked the "feel" of a Fatal Fury game, but all four rated it as a very playable fighting game which is worth at least trying in the arcade. While acknowledging that Fatal Fury fans might be disappointed by the reduced roster of fighters, GamePro praised the new third fighting plane and ranking system, and concluded that "Instead of simply adding more fighters, FF3 does more with fewer fighters (hidden moves and so on) and a unique method of gameplay." They gave the Neo Geo CD a generally positive review as well, remarking that Bob and Franco are "uninteresting" new characters but praising the detailed stages, the controls, and the modifications to Mai's Swan Dive attack.

In a retrospective review, Maximum highly praised the game's adaptation of combos and special moves, and argued that if it were not for the difficulty in executing super power moves, Fatal Fury 3 would have become the leading action game in the arcades. They gave it 4 out of 5 stars.

Next Generation reviewed the Neo Geo version of the game, rating it two stars out of five, and stated that "The players are all able, even if just for a few seconds, to slip out of the line of fire either to avoid enemy attack or to set up for an offensive move. Beyond this feature the game is standard fare."
