= The King of Fighters Neowave =

2004 video game

- Japanese arcade flyer featuring Kyo Kusanagi (foreground) and Geese Howard (background)
- Developer: SNK Playmore (Note: With assistance from Noise Factory.)
- Publishers: Sammy Corporation (Arcade): JP/NA: SNK Playmore; EU: Ignition Entertainment
- Directors: Kazuaki Ezato; Gou Miyazaki; Takahiro Abe; T‑2000
- Producers: Eikichi Kawasaki; Moon
- Artist: Tomokazu Nakano
- Composer: Tamotsu Karatsu
- Series: The King of Fighters
- Platforms: Arcade; PlayStation 2 Xbox
- Release: Arcade: JP: July 30, 2004; PlayStation 2: JP: July 21, 2005; EU: October 13, 2006; Xbox: JP: March 30, 2006; NA: April 18, 2006
- Genre: Fighting
- Modes: Single-player, multiplayer
- Arcade system: Atomiswave

The King of Fighters Neowave, often shortened as KOF Neowave, or KOF NW, is a 2004 2D fighting game produced by SNK Playmore. It is their first coin-operated arcade game for Sammy's Atomiswave hardware, following the release of The King of Fighters 2003 being the final Neo Geo arcade installment from the franchise. Home ports were released for PlayStation 2 and Xbox shortly after its release in the arcade. The game is loosely based on The King of Fighters 2002, with some changes to the roster and stages, most notably featuring the boss Geese Howard from Art of Fighting 2, replacing Rugal Bernstein.

The game features no narrative. The character artwork was done by Tomokazu Nakano, famous for creating art for Power Instinct. The game uses the common fighting system of the series involving the creation of teams each composed of three characters who compete against one another to decide which team moves on. The two console ports also added multiple hidden characters not present in the arcade. Compared to usual The King of Fighters games, Neowave received a mediocre reception, with several writers criticizing its lack of innovative features as well as being called inferior to previous installments.

== Gameplay ==
A fight with Kyo Kusanagi and Iori Yagami

The game reverts to the 3-character elimination system from The King of Fighters '94 to The King of Fighters '98. It ignores gameplay features from later installments like the "Striker" system from The King of Fighters '99 to The King of Fighters 2001, and the tag team system in The King of Fighters 2003. With the change of hardware from Neo Geo to Atomiswave, the number of buttons was increased to five. In addition to the standard four attack buttons used in the previous games, a fifth button is now present which activates Heat Mode. Heat Mode will cause the character to blink red and provide a strength boost, with the side effect being that the character's health will deplete. The player will return to normal after getting hit by the opponent or by pressing the Heat Mode button again to deactivate it. The player must wait until a new round to activate Heat Mode again. The player cannot use Heat Mode when the life gauge is low.

The player can select from three different playing styles similar to KOF '97 and KOF '98. These styles affect the techniques available to the player and the length of their Power Gauge.

In Super Cancel Mode (SC Mode), the player has a three stock Power Gauge. The player can perform Super Special Moves (which requires one Power Gauge stock) and MAX Super Special Moves (which requires two). With one Power stock, the player can cancel a regular move into a Special or Super Special move, and a regular Special into a Super Special. The player can also use one Power stock to cancel a guard into a Knockdown Blow or an Emergency Escape, or perform a Quick Emergency Escape during a normal or command move.

In Guard Break Mode (GB Mode), the player has a two stock Power Gauge. Like in SC Mode, the player can perform Super Special (one stock) and MAX Super Special Moves (two stock). The player can parry an opponent's attack using the "Just Defend" technique, guarding against the attack at the precise moment it makes contact with the character, allowing the opportunity for a counterattack. Using one Power stock, the player can guard cancel into an Emergency Escape or perform a Quick Emergency Escape. The player can also perform a Guard Break attack with one Power stock, which is an unblockable version of a character's Knockdown Attack.

In MAX2 Mode (M2 Mode), the player has a single stock Power Gauge. The player can perform Super Special Moves with one stock, as well as MAX Super Special Moves. However, MAX moves can only be performed when the player has 25% or less of their life gauge remaining. Additionally, an exclusive MAX2 move can be performed under these conditions. In M2 Mode, the player can guard cancel into a Knockdown Attack.

== Characters ==
Like KOF '98 and KOF 2002, Neowave has no storyline, but is instead a "Dream Match" which gathers numerous characters from various past KOF games, regardless of their status in the overarching storyline. The character roster of the arcade version is similar to the Neo Geo version of KOF 2002, with a few differences in the team placement. The KOF 2000 Team and the KOF 2001 Team are eliminated from the lineup, and a Mixed Team is introduced, composed of Saisyu Kusanagi, Kula Diamond, and Shingo Yabuki from both KOF '98 and KOF '99. Vanessa and Ramón, are still featured in the arcade version as hidden characters, along with the Orochi versions of the Orochi Team. Geese Howard appears in the game as the main boss character, with this incarnation being based on his younger self from Art of Fighting 2.

The PlayStation 2 version brings back five characters from KOF 2002: Seth, May Lee, Angel, the Kusanagi clone, and Omega Rugal (with K9999 being the only character from KOF 2002 missing in this version). The Xbox version, due to licensing issues with Eolith, includes all the characters from the PlayStation 2 version with the exception of Ángel and May Lee.

Japan Team

- Kyo Kusanagi
- Benimaru Nikaido
- Goro Daimon

K′ Team

- K'
- Maxima
- Whip

Iori Team

- Iori Yagami
- Mature
- Vice

Orochi Team / Awakened Orochi Team

- Yashiro Nanakase / Orochi Yashiro
- Shermie / Orochi Shermie
- Chris / Orochi Chris

Fatal Fury Team

- Terry Bogard
- Andy Bogard
- Joe Higashi

Psycho Soldier Team

- Athena Asamiya
- Sie Kensou
- Chin Gentsai

Outlaw Team AKA 97 Special Team

- Ryuji Yamazaki
- Blue Mary
- Billy Kane

Art of Fighting Team

- Ryo Sakazaki
- Robert Garcia
- Takuma Sakazaki

Ikari Team

- Leona
- Ralf Jones
- Clark Still

Rival Team

- Kula Diamond
- Saisyu Kusanagi
- Shingo Yabuki

Korea Team

- Jhun Hoon
- Choi Bounge
- Chang Koehan

Women Fighters Team

- Mai Shiranui
- Yuri Sakazaki
- King

Hidden single entry characters

- Ángel (Note: PS2 version only)
- Geese Howard (Note: Boss character, based on the younger version from Art of Fighting 2)
- Kim Kaphwan
- Kusanagi (Note: PS2 and Xbox versions only)
- May Lee
- Omega Rugal
- Ramón
- Seth
- Vanessa

== Development and release ==
SNK Playmore promoted Neowave since early 2004, promoting the arcade version during April in Japan with the promise of returning characters from The King of Fighters 2002, but also new backgrounds. By the mid-2000s, SNK's in-house Neo-Geo hardware had become dated. After The King of Fighters 2003, SNK Playmore looked for newer substitute platforms for future development. The Atomiswave, a cartridge-based multi-arcade system like the Neo-Geo and inspired by Sega's Dreamcast hardware, with which SNK was already familiar, was an obvious candidate. Rather than blindly committing to a new major game, SNK instead chose to "test the waters" with a remix of The King of Fighters 2002, tweaking the game's systems; reskinning the game with high-resolution backgrounds, character art, and interface elements to take advantage of the more advanced hardware; and removing characters originating with the Eolith-developed KOF2001 and KOF2002, replacing them with other SNK-originated characters.

The game was also made on the PlayStation 2 and Xbox. The PlayStation 2 and Xbox versions of the graphics consist of polygonal 3D backgrounds overlaid with 2D character sprites (similar to the 3D stages featured in the console versions of previous games in the series such as the Dreamcast versions of KOF '98 and KOF '99). The PlayStation 2 version was only released in Japan and the PAL region, while the Xbox version was released both in Japan and North America. Additionally, the Xbox version was the last game released for the console in Japan. The North American version was released on April 18, 2006. In 2020, a Dreamcast homebrew adaptation of the arcade version was also made possible due to the Dreamcast sharing almost identical hardware with its Atomiswave cousin.

== Reception ==
Reception

Aggregate score
Aggregator	Score
Metacritic	PS2: 57/100; Xbox: 62/100

Review scores
Publication	Score
Eurogamer	7/10
GameSpot	6.5/10
IGN	6.8/10
TeamXbox	6.6/10

The King of Fighters: Neowave was met with mixed reviews upon release. Reviewers noted the updated graphics and traditionally solid mechanics, and were pleased with online play in the console versions. They also commented on the drab presentation and overly familiar design. Charles Onyett wrote for IGN, "Sure it's got updated graphics, a few different styles of play, and a huge roster of fighters, but it does little to entice any non-KoF fans into the mix, something this genre desperately needs." For GameSpot, Greg Kasavin said that the game "still packs some good stuff for hardcore fans, but the touched-up paint job doesn't make this feel like a whole new game. In fact, in some ways it feels like a step backward from The King of Fighters 2002." Eurogamer praised the modified fighting system that gives the player multiple ways of fighting similar opponents to the well-received Capcom vs. SNK 2, but still lamented the recycled visuals.. VideoGamer.com found the visuals and content repetitive for the series, but it still felt like a solid game for casuals who have not played prior installments.

In retrospect, Time Extension claimed there are multiple people who believe Neowave is an inferior take on The King of Fighters 2002. Despite praising the character artworks, Hardcore Gaming 101 lamented that Neowave removed all of 2003 characters in favor of 2002 with Geese's notable exception and how characters have no victory lines. Both ports were also criticized for having long loading times.
