= Real Bout Fatal Fury =

1995 video game

- Japanese arcade flyer
- Developer: SNK
- Publishers: SNK: PlayStation; JP: SNK; NA: Namco Hometek; EU: Sony Computer Entertainment
- Producers: Eikichi Kawasaki; Takashi Nishiyama
- Designers: Takahisa Yariyama; Takashi Tsukamoto
- Programmer: Tony Oki
- Artists: Ema Sue; G. Ishidaman; Higashi Pon
- Composers: Hideki Asanaka; Toshio Shimizu
- Series: Fatal Fury
- Platforms: Arcade, Neo Geo AES, Neo Geo CD, PlayStation, Sega Saturn
- Release: December 21, 1995: Arcade; WW: December 21, 1995 Neo Geo AES; WW: January 26, 1996 Neo Geo CD; JP/EU: February 23, 1996 Saturn; JP: September 20, 1996 PlayStation; JP: January 10, 1997; EU: August 1997
- Genre: Fighting
- Modes: Single-player, multiplayer
- Arcade system: Neo Geo MVS

Real Bout Fatal Fury (Note: Known in Japan as Real Bout Garō Densetsu (Japanese: リアルバウト餓狼伝説, Hepburn: Rearu Bauto Garō Densetsu; lit. Real Bout Hungry Wolf Legend).) is a 1995 fighting game developed and published by SNK for the Neo Geo arcade and home platforms. It is the fourth mainline installment in the Fatal Fury series, following Fatal Fury 3: Road to the Final Victory, and the first game of the Real Bout sub-series.

Ports of Real Bout Fatal Fury were released on February 23, 1996 for the Neo Geo CD in Japan and Europe, on September 20, 1996 for the Sega Saturn in Japan, which requires the 1MB RAM cartridge for the system, and on January 10, 1997 for the PlayStation also in Japan and Europe. (Note: An American version was advertised alongside the PlayStation ports of Samurai Shodown III and The King of Fighters '95, but was never released.) It was included in Fatal Fury Battle Archives Vol. 2 compilation released in February 2007 for the PlayStation 2. The compilation was re-released in the PlayStation Store on PlayStation 4 in March 2017. Hamster Corporation re-released the game as part of their ACA Neo Geo series for the PlayStation 4, Xbox One, Nintendo Switch, Windows, Android and iOS.

== Gameplay ==
Gameplay screenshot showcasing a match between Blue Mary and Mai Shiranui

Real Bout changes the play controls from the previous Fatal Fury games, reducing the number of attack buttons from four to three: a standard punch and kick button, a "Strong Attack" button which can be either a stronger punch or kick attack, depending on the character. The game retains the three-plane "oversway" system from Fatal Fury 3, which features a main lane for fighting, with foreground and background planes used to avoid attacks or leap towards the opponent. A dedicated button is now used to make an "oversway" (or change plane) towards the background or foreground.

Real Bout introduces a Power Gauge, which fills up as the player performs normal or special techniques against their opponent or defend themselves, similar to many super move gauges featured in other fighting games. The Power Gauge allows players to perform one of three types of Special Techniques, depending on the level of the Power Gauge:

- When the gauge is at least half-full and colored yellow, the player can perform "Guard Cancels", which are special counterattacks that can be performed by the player after blocking an opponent's attack. They do not consume any filled portion of the Power Gauge.
- When the Power Gauge reaches MAX level while the player still has more than half of their life gauge remaining, then the Power Gauge will enter "S. Power" level. The energy in the Power Gauge will begin to deplete gradually and during that time, the player can perform "Guard Cancels" or a "Super Special Move" (a powerful Special Move). However, once a Super Special Move is performed, the remaining energy in the Power Gauge will be consumed and the Power Gauge will return to its initial state.
- When the Power Gauge reaches MAX level while the player has less than half of their life gauge remaining (when the life gauge is flashing red), the Power Gauge will enter "P. Power" level. In this state, the Power Gauge will gradually drain, but the player can perform both Guard Cancels and Super Specials indefinitely until the gauge runs out. The player can also perform a "Hidden Ability", an even more powerful Special Move (similar to the Hidden Abilities in the previous game), which will consume the remaining Power Gauge at this state.

Real Bout also introduces stages with ring-outs, a gameplay feature previously introduced in 3D fighting games such as Virtua Fighter, but the out of bounds areas are guarded by barriers. If a fighter's attacks force the opponent to hit a barrier enough times, the barrier is destroyed, and a fighter can win by knocking the opponent out of bounds. The normal chain combo system, including in the mid-air, is similar to that of X-Men: Children of the Atom.

== Characters ==
The game retains the character roster from Fatal Fury 3, with the boss characters (Ryuji Yamazaki, Jin Chonrei and Jin Chonshu) now part of the regular cast. Duck King, Billy Kane and Kim Kaphwan, who were all last featured in Fatal Fury Special, are added to the cast. Series antagonist Geese Howard reprises his role from the original Fatal Fury as the game's final boss. Real Bout was Geese Howard's final appearance in the Fatal Fury storyline, as the game's ending with Terry or Andy depicts the character's demise at the hands of either brother by falling off the roof of his tower, refusing to be saved by them. This was reflected by SNK's tagline for the game, "So long, Geese!" (さらば、ギース, Saraba, Gīsu).

== Development ==
SNK redesigned the controls and battles, and improved the sense of exhilaration and ease of use by adding two health bars and flashy effects. To achieve this, they made the decision to bring most of the processing that was highly praised in Fatal Fury 3 to the foreground in Real Bout. In retrospect, Yasuyuki Oda believes Real Bout was a masterpiece.

== Reception ==
Reception

Review scores
Publication	Score
Electronic Gaming Monthly	8.75/10 (Neo Geo)
Next Generation	3/5 (Neo Geo)
Dengeki PlayStation	70/100, 80/100, 75/100, 70/100
Maximum	4/5 (Neo Geo)

In Japan, Game Machine listed Real Bout Fatal Fury as the fourth most popular arcade game of January 1996. According to Famitsu, the AES and Neo Geo CD version sold over 22,750 and 63,091 copies in their first week on the market, respectively.

Electronic Gaming Monthly gave the Neo Geo AES version their "Game of the Month" award. Their four reviewers applauded the pits, the overhauled personality of the characters, the high end graphics, and the humor. Andrew Baran described the game as "intense, both in speed and pyrotechnics". GamePro deemed it a major improvement over Fatal Fury 3: Road to the Final Victory, citing the greater effectiveness of the characters Bob and Mary, the more refined combo system, and the inclusion of moves which were taken out of the previous game. They criticized the reduction from four action buttons to three, the reuse of Geese Howard as the final boss, and the music ("ranges from banal rock to obnoxious drek"), but concluded that "With its emphasis on gameplay, this is one of the best Fatal Fury games ever." A reviewer for Next Generation echoed this sentiment: "The characters from the Fatal Fury series are all here and their moves have all been balanced to make this one of the best Fatal Fury titles ever." He characterized the game as a refinement drawn from the countless hours SNK had spent making 2D fighting games. While they derided the game's lack of originality, particularly its similarity to the previous installment Fatal Fury 3, Maximum assessed it as "a well-rounded and entertaining fighting title". They particularly approved of the oversway system, the barriers preventing easy ring outs, the balanced difficulty of the one-player mode, and the two-player battles.
