= Fatal Fury Special =

1993 video game

- Arcade flyer
- Developer: SNK (Note: X68000 version developed by System Prisma; SNES version developed by Monolith Corp.; Game Gear version developed by Gaibrain and Aspect; PC Engine CD-ROM² version developed by Mutech; Sega CD version developed by Funcom.)
- Publishers: SNK: X68000 Magical Company Game Gear, Super NES Takara CD-ROM² Hudson Soft Sega CD; JP: Victor Entertainment; NA/EU: JVC Musical Industries FM Towns Japan Home Video
- Producer: Eikichi Kawasaki
- Designer: Takashi Tsukamoto
- Artists: Ayumi Tsuzaki; Higashi Pon
- Composers: Toshio Shimizu; Yasumasa Yamada; Yoshihiko Kitamura
- Series: Fatal Fury
- Platform: Arcade: Neo Geo AES, X68000, Super NES, Neo Geo CD, Game Gear, PC Engine CD-ROM², Sega CD, FM Towns
- Release: September 16, 1993: Arcade; JP: September 16, 1993; NA: September 1993 Neo Geo AES; JP/NA: December 22, 1993 X68000; JP: July 28, 1994 Super NES; JP: July 29, 1994; NA/EU: April 1995 Neo Geo CD; JP: September 9, 1994; NA: 1996 Game Gear; JP: November 25, 1994; NA: 1994; EU: March 1995 CD-ROM²; JP: December 2, 1994 Sega CD; JP: March 31, 1995; NA: 1995; EU: July 1995 FM Towns; JP: September 13, 1996
- Genre: Fighting
- Modes: Single-player, multiplayer
- Arcade system: Neo Geo MVS

Fatal Fury Special (Note: Known in Japan as Garō Densetsu Special (Japanese: 餓狼伝説SPECIAL, Hepburn: Garō Densetsu Special; lit. "Hungry Wolf Legend Special")) is a 1993 fighting game developed and published by SNK for the Neo Geo arcade and home platforms. The third installment of the Fatal Fury series, it is an updated version of Fatal Fury 2 (1992), adding four CPU-only bosses as playable characters, featuring three characters from its predecessor, and introducing combos while further balancing the gameplay. In addition, it featured Ryo Sakazaki as a secret boss character at the end of the single-player mode; the inclusion of Ryo inspired SNK to create The King of Fighters series.

== Gameplay ==
Gameplay screenshot showcasing a match between Mai Shiranui and Andy Bogard in Italy

Fatal Fury Special is an updated version of Fatal Fury 2. It features many of the same graphics and gameplay, although some slight changes were made to the system, including faster game speed and an all new combo system. Unlike the previous Fatal Fury games, Special allows the player to combine their attacks. When an attack lands, the player will have a brief moment of invincibility. The number of Line Move Attacks have also increased; pressing the Light Punch or Light Kick button while the opponent is on an opposite line will perform a Low Line Jump Attack.

In single-player mode, the player fights all of the playable characters, beginning with the eight regular characters from the previous game, as well as Tung and Duck; the player gets to choose their first opponent. After the first ten opponents, the player will fight against Billy, Axel, Laurence, Geese, and Krauser, respectively. If the player wins every match in two rounds, they will be challenged by Ryo in a special "Dream Match".

== Characters ==
The character roster of Fatal Fury 2 returns. The four AI-only characters from the previous game (Billy Kane, Axel Hawk, Laurence Blood, and Wolfgang Krauser) can now be controlled by the player, and three characters from the original Fatal Fury (Tung Fu Rue, Duck King, and Geese Howard) return, increasing the number of playable characters to fifteen. Ryo Sakazaki, the protagonist of Art of Fighting, appears as a hidden opponent at the end of the Single Player Mode and is playable in the home versions. This cross-over inspired SNK to create The King of Fighters series. The first installment of this series, The King of Fighters '94, was released a year after Fatal Fury Special.

== Release ==
=== Home versions ===
In addition to the home versions of the Neo Geo and Neo Geo CD, conversions of Fatal Fury Special were made for the Super Nintendo Entertainment System (with Playmates Interactive Entertainment handling distribution in North America), Sega CD and Game Gear, as well as the PC Engine game console (in CD-ROM² format), and the X68000 and FM Towns computer platforms in Japan between 1994 and 1996. The game is included in 2007's Fatal Fury: Battle Archives Volume 1 for the PlayStation 2.

Fatal Fury Special for the Neo Geo was later released on the Wii Virtual Console in 2010. An emulation of the Neo Geo arcade game was also released for the Xbox Live Arcade in 2007. Furthermore, mobile versions were released for Android and iOS-based devices. Hamster Corporation re-released the game as part of their ACA Neo Geo series for the PlayStation 4, Xbox One, Nintendo Switch, Windows, Android and iOS. The Super NES version was re-released on the Nintendo Classics service on October 9, 2025.

== Reception ==
Reception

Review scores
Publication	Score
Consoles +	Game Gear: 92% Mega CD: 85% SNES: 86%
Computer and Video Games	Arcade: 83% Mega CD: 67%
Edge	Neo Geo: 8/10
Electronic Gaming Monthly	Neo Geo: 9/10, 9/10, 8/10, 8/10; Sega CD: 7.375/10; SNES: 7.375/10
Famitsu	Game Gear: 22/40; PC Engine: 29/40; Mega CD: 21/40
GameSpot	XBLA: 6.5/10
Next Generation	SNES: 2/5
Nintendo Power	SNES: 12.8/20
Official Nintendo Magazine	SNES: 92%
TeamXbox	XBLA: 9/10
Digital Press	Neo Geo: 9/10; Game Gear: 8.5/10
Retro Gamer	XBLA: 82%.

In Japan, Game Machine listed Fatal Fury Special on their October 15, 1993 issue as being the most-successful table arcade unit of the month. It went on to be Japan's third highest-grossing arcade game of 1994, just below Super Street Fighter II X and Virtua Fighter. In North America, RePlay reported that Fatal Fury Special was the seventh most-popular arcade game in December 1993. Play Meter also listed Fatal Fury Special to be the thirty-eighth most-popular arcade game at the time.

The Neo Geo version received positive reviews from critics. GamePro praised the variety of characters, the addition of new moves for the older characters, the combos, the detailed graphics, and the humorous touches to the backgrounds, though they felt the ability to jump between the foreground and background tended to be an annoyance. All four reviewers for Electronic Gaming Monthly (EGM) referred to it as "one of the best tournament fighting games out there" (with insignificant changes in wording between each reviewer). They praised the new characters, the improved backgrounds and animations.

GamePro gave the Game Gear version a rave review, stating though it has fewer characters and vastly inferior graphics and sounds compared to the Neo Geo version, it "is arguably the best handheld fighting game ever released" due to the responsive action and the inclusion of "extra elements you never thought you'd see in a handheld fighter". The magazine particularly applauded the presence of a combo system and the numerous special moves.

GamePro declared the Sega CD version, "yet another Neo Geo arcade game that's been poorly converted for a home system". Although they complimented the inclusion of all the characters, moves, and music of the arcade version, they felt that the removal of key animation frames and distinctive background elements would make the conversion a big disappointment to anyone used to the arcade game. The four reviewers of Electronic Gaming Monthly instead judged it to be an overall solid conversion, remarking that the sound effects are weak and garbled, but the music, play controls, and graphics all replicate the original with reasonable accuracy.

All four reviewers of EGM complained about the severe echo effect in the audio of the SNES version, and two of them said that some of the moves are hard to pull off. However, they commented that the graphics, while a step down from the Neo Geo version, are still relatively sharp, and judged it an overall good conversion. GamePro was less pleased with the conversion, and remarked that the graphics and controls are vastly inferior to those of the Neo Geo version. They also criticized the special moves which are activated when a character is near death as a "cheesy way of evening things out between players of varying skill levels." Next Generation also gave it a negative review, though almost solely for its perceived lack of originality, saying that "sprite-based 2D fighting games are a dime a dozen, and in spite of the impressive Dolby Surround, all this one really has going it is sheer size: 15 characters ... and five special moves apiece, some of which are slick, but none of which you haven't pulled off it some other game of its ilk."

Jeff Gerstmann of GameSpot, reviewing the Xbox Live Arcade release, remarked the game is emulated well, and approved of the fact that it emulates the Neo Geo home version rather than the arcade version. He stated that the game itself is good compared to other Neo Geo fighters of its time, but would probably not appeal to modern players who are not already familiar with the Fatal Fury franchise. In a 1996 retrospective review, Maximum commented that Fatal Fury Special "tweaked the gameplay of Fatal Fury 2 overly very superficially, and the main selling point lay with the number of combatants". However, they praised the more hectic pace of the game, and gave it 3 out of 5 stars.
