= Nobuyuki Kuroki =

Japanese game designer working for SNK

Nobuyuki Kuroki (Japanese: 黒木 信幸, Hepburn: Kuroki Nobuyuki) is a Japanese game designer working for SNK. He did art for several Art of Fighting and Fatal Fury games and took a bigger role in The King of Fighters XIV and Samurai Shodown.

== Biography ==
=== Early life and preferences ===
Nobuyuki Kuroki originally wanted to become a manga artist but felt he was not suitable for the job after going to an art school. Kuroki was a fan of John Wayne, Dragonlance and The Lord of the Rings.

He found the requirement list for SNK on the bulletin board at his school by chance. Upon seeing the company SNK, Kuroki was amazed by the fighting game Art of Fighting which he considered a masterpiece. This inspired him to work at SNK. Kuroki studied in the same art school as Yasuyuki Oda, Osaka Designers' College. His biggest impression from Art of Fighting was one of the main characters, Ryo Sakazaki.

Kuroki's three favorite games include Fatal Fury: King of Fighters, Diablo III and Call of Duty 4: Modern Warfare. He also took a liking to the characters Terry Bogard and B. Jenet.

=== Career ===
Kuroki joined SNK in 1993. His first job was developing Yuri Sakazaki and Geese Howard's stages from the sequel Art of Fighting 2. In regards to Geese's younger persona in contrast to his adult look from Fatal Fury, Kuroki was influenced by an original video animation that featured him in a similar form. As he was an assistant, Kuroki had a bigger role in Fatal Fury 3 where he designed the new characters, the Jin Brothers which gave him pressure. He also worked on Wolfgang Krauser in Real Bout Fatal Fury Special and Rick Strowd in Real Bout Fatal Fury 2: The Newcomers, as well as Ryo Sakazaki in Art of Fighting 3.

The character of Rock Howard was created by Kuroki in 1998. Both he and Yasuyuki Oda wondered what type of hero would succeed Terry Bogard in Fatal Fury's latest game, Garou: Mark of the Wolves. While they were not confident with Rock, they still decided to make him as the new protagonist. Kuroki considers Garou as one of SNK's best creations based on the appeal of the graphics despite being a Neo Geo game. While he kept working in other games as artist while supporting other staff member, for the 2019 Samurai Shodown game, he took a bigger role in The King of Fighters XIV. Kuroki said staff wanted to captivate new fans with Kyo Kusanagi's larger design. Despite this, they accepted that any redesign of Kyo would elicit a mixed reaction and hoped older players of the series would understand he is still the same character despite any cosmetic changes. He regarded The King of Fighters XIV as a success based on the number of players buying it.

Kuroki debuted as game director in Samurai Shodown. Kuroki felt proud with developing this game and being able to port to other consoles, most notably the Switch. For this game, Kuroki took advantage for the Unreal Engine in order to create art worthy of their preferences. Kuroki aimed the fighting system to be faithful to their previous installments. He also felt that the game would be easy for newcomers in fighting games.

Kuroki stated in February 2020 that he is personally interested in 'reviving' Garou: Mark of the Wolves, with Kuroki having already done Rock and B. Jenet's animations before the sequel was cancelled. Similarly, he is into the idea of rebooting Art of Fighting.

== Works ==
- Art of Fighting 2 (1994) - Pixel art
- Real Bout Fatal Fury (1995)- Pixel art
- Art of Fighting 3 (1996) - Pixel art
- Real Bout Fatal Fury Special (1997) - Pixel art
- Real Bout Fatal Fury 2: The Newcomers (1998) - Design front, pixel art
- Garou: Mark of the Wolves (1999) - Pixel art
- The King of Fighters XIV (2016) - Art director
- SNK Heroines: Tag Team Frenzy (2018) - Thanks
- Samurai Shodown (2019) - Director, art director
