= Rock Howard =

Fictional character from Fatal Fury and The King of Fighters

- Fatal Fury and The King of Fighters character
- Rock Howard in Garou: Mark of the Wolves by Tonko
- First game: Fatal Fury 3: Road to the Final Victory (1995, non-playable); Garou: Mark of the Wolves (1999, playable debut)
- Created by: Nobuyuki Kuroki
- Voiced by: English: Griffin Puatu (COTW); Japanese: Eiji Takemoto (1999–2008); Yuuma Uchida (2017–present); Ami Koshimizu (young; KOF: D)

In-universe information
- Fighting style: Mixed martial arts
- Family: Geese Howard (father); Terry Bogard (adoptive father); Kain R. Heinlein (uncle); Marie Heinlein (mother); Wolfgang Krauser (half-uncle); Andy Bogard (adoptive uncle); Rudolph Krauser (grandfather, deceased); Jin Chonshu (distant relative); Jin Chonrei (distant relative); Jin Oryu (ancestor); Jin Kairyu (ancestor); Jin Kuryu (ancestor); Jin Tairyu (direct ancestor, pre-incarnation)
- Origin: United States
- Nationality: American

Rock Howard (Japanese: ロック・ハワード, Hepburn: Rokku Hawādo) is a fictional character from SNK's Fatal Fury series. Previously debuted as a non-playable character in Fatal Fury 3: Road to the Final Victory, Rock makes his first playable appearance in the 1999 fighting game Garou: Mark of the Wolves, a sixth canonical chapter in the series, as the new lead character of the Wolves sub-entry storylines. Rock appears in the series as the son of Geese Howard, the main antagonist from the previous Fatal Fury games, who fell to his death after refusing to be saved by Terry Bogard. However, Terry adopted Rock in order to put his past with Geese behind him, and helped teach Rock how to fight. The mystery behind his missing father leads him to clash with Terry in Mark of the Wolves is further explored in the 2025 sequel Fatal Fury: City of the Wolves. Besides his appearance in Mark of the Wolves, Rock is featured in few games from The King of Fighters series, as well as various crossovers from SNK. The King of Fighters XIV and The King of Fighters XV feature him as downloadable content with the latter incorparting him into the main KOF canon for the first time as the leader of the Garou Team with B. Jenet and Gato, two fellow rivals from his original game.

Rock was created by Nobuyuki Kuroki to be the new Fatal Fury as well as Terry's successor. This resulted in his younger contrasting look and dark fate caused by his relationship with Geese. Rock's development in the KOF spin-off series was handled by Akihiko Ureshino who wanted to further explore Rock's life before Garou while in KOF DLC he was developed to be a stronger fighter. His returns in City of the Wolves is meant to further explore his lineage and relationship with Terry Bogard. He was voiced by Eiji Takemoto (竹本 英史) since debut until Maximum Impact Regulation A, later voiced by Yuuma Uchida (内田雄馬). In the English edition of KOF: Maximum Impact, he is voiced by Jon Thomas and by Mike Lane in its sequel, later voiced by Griffin Puatu as of City of the Wolves.

Rock has also been featured in manwhua adaptations from the games he has appeared as well as the anime The King of Fighters Another Day and The King of Fighters: Destiny. Rock's character has received various responses from video games publications. His debut in Mark of the Wolves has been highly praised by reviewers although some of them considered his character to be too strong in comparison to the others, although his development in the KOF: Maximum Impact series has been criticized due to his English voice actor and his new outfit. The character has been praised for his game design as his mixed martial arts combine elements from his father Geese with his adoptive father Terry, as a symbolic way of describing his life with his dark fate. While his story in Fatal Fury in general has been popular form due to Garou ending on a dark cliffhanger, the character has also been popular for his return in City of the Wolves and his inclusion as downloadable content in The King of Fighters with a more balanced design.

== Conception and design ==
Early sketch of Rock by Nobuyuki Kuroki.

Though introduced as a playable character in Garou: Mark of the Wolves, Rock's first appearance was a cameo in Fatal Fury 3: Road to the Final Victory as a child. From a cameo, he ended up becoming a protagonist with that strong presence. For that reason, the character with Terry Bogard's cap, Rock, did not appear in the plot Fatal Fury writers wrote back then. . Rock Howard was designed as the new lead character of the Fatal Fury series by Nobuyuki Kuroki in 1998. Both he and Yasuyuki Oda wondered what type of hero would succeed Terry Bogard in Fatal Fury's latest game, Garou: Mark of the Wolves. While they were not confident with Rock, they still decided to make him as the new protagonist. Rock's character and entire personality served as the main basis for the game. This led to the creation of supporting characters like B. Jenet or Terry Bogard's redesign. Since Rock was the protagonist, the cast gave full attention to him. Nobyuki Kuroki tried giving him his own style of cool which he hoped would attract gamers. According to Yasuyuki Oda, the phrase The King of Fighters is commonly associated with Kyo Kusanagi and Iori Yagami than Fatal Fury characters. As a result, the new tournament was dubbed "Maximum Mayhem King of Fighters" to give a new tension to associate Terry and Rock.

Rock was designed to contrast previous masculine Fatal Fury characters by giving him a more bishonen appearance, something Kuroki felt the sequel needed to balance the cast. According to Oda, Rock was originally a weak character in his own debut. SNK wanted Rock to retain many of his original traits from Mark of the Wolves, such as the way he adjusts his gloves. Dan was in a subprogrammer in charge of enemy AIs as well as Rock. His Deadly Rave move was originally hard to do during location tests. The story was written with a cliffhanger from the get go, leaving material for a potential sequel which remained on development hell. New moves were done for both Rock and B. Jenet before the development was put on hold.

=== Development ===
Though Akihiko Ureshino has not talked about working in the upcoming Fatal Fury sequel Fatal Fury: City of the Wolves, he sees the Terry from Garou: Mark of the Wolves as a more fatherly character having issues adopting Rock Howard and trying his best to write them together in the spin-off KOF: Maximum Impact which takes place before Garou under his own request. When Rock says that "there is a possibility that he may change greatly in the future", he means that when he is confronted with a truth that he did not know until then, the values that Rock has cultivated while living with Terry may be completely overturned. If a sequel were had been released, perhaps Rock might have been transformed into a character who was at odds with Terry. Rock makes his first appearance in The King of Fighters as a child in The King of Fighters 2001. Designer Yamazaki said there was a reason behind having Rock appear as a child. He previously said that he wanted to have Rock in Capcom vs. SNK, but the Garou team refused, saying, he should first developed. So among SNK, they said they were not having him again. As a result, SNK decided to have Rock as a child as a declaration of our determination not to have Rock appear in KOF. Yamazaki found it more frustrating that he ended up appearing in Capcom vs. SNK 2.

While Rock joined Maximum Impact at the equivalent of 17 years old, young Terry's age has stopped at about 24 years old. That is why Ureshino finds it uncomfortable when the two of them talk in demo scenes and the like. Geese is already dead in the world of Maximum Impact. That led Rock's age as the standard and Terry's middle aged man by the default. For him, it was fun to think about the reactions of Rock, or Billy, who faced Geese's nightmare. For The King of Fighters XIV, Rock was considered for inclusion. Although Geese's appearance resulted in the development team finding it complicated to proceed with this plan, as Mark of the Wolves occurs years after Geese's death in the Fatal Fury series, they ultimately changed their minds and included Rock as a DLC character. According to Oda, Rock was originally a weak character in his own debut. As a result, the staff highly reworked Rock's fighting style for The King of Fighters XIV in order simultaneously strengthen him and heighten his popularity. At the same time, SNK wanted Rock to retain many of his original traits from Mark of the Wolves, such as the way he adjusts his gloves.

Several of the Miera brothers' prototype designs were assigned to other characters' alternate outfits; in this case, Alba's prototype design became Rock's alternate outfit. Two of his extra outfits from KOF: Maximum Impact 2 are also cosplays from Kaede, the lead character from The Last Blade (this is in contrast to the similarities between Sakura Mitsukoshi from Face's Money Puzzle Exchanger and Sakura Kinomoto from Clamp's Cardcaptor Sakura, as both of them have green eyes and voiced by Sakura Tange, Eiji Takemoto's then castmate in Aoni Production), and Kain R. Heinlein, the final boss from Garou: Mark of the Wolves.

Ureshino states that he does not know about Rock's mother or the true inheritor of Geese's legacy but hints that it would most likely conflict with Terry if SNK released another game involving them. One of Oda's biggest desires with City of the Wolves is ending Rock's story arc which has been on cliffhangers for decades due to SNK cancelling the first Garou sequel. Rock's and Terry's designs in City of the Wolves were altered to look different from The King of Fighters and have a different demeanor. Rock's appearance was changed based on American comic books as notable through his altered facial expressions. The story will properly explore Rock Howard's lineage as foreshadowed by his uncle Kain R. Heinlein in the ending of Garou: Mark of the Wolves. It was decided to skip the timeline some years making Rock now a young adult.

== Appearances ==
=== Fatal Fury games ===
Despite making cameos in Fatal Fury 3: Road to the Final Victory as a child friendly with the lead Terry Bogard, Rock is properly introduced as a playable character in Garou: Mark of the Wolves, having both lived with Terry and studied martial arts under him for ten years after Geese Howard's death. During this time, a new King of Fighters tournament arose under the name "Maximum Mayhem", which Rock and Terry both decide to compete in. By the end of the tournament, Rock finds his final opponent is Kain R. Heinlein, who reveals himself to be both the host and Rock's materinal uncle. Kain, aware that Geese Howard's legacy held presumably valuable secrets but unable to access it without assistance, wins Rock's aid in obtaining it by offering information regarding Rock's mother Marie—whom Kain claimed was still alive. Terry accepts Rock's decision to become Kain's new partner, with Rock promising to return. Memories of Stray Wolves, a twenty-minute featurette serves as a retrospective of the Fatal Fury series, with Terry narrating the events of the games to Rock.

In Fatal Fury: City of the Wolves, Kain learns that Marie is being held captive by Mr. Big, who demands Geese's legacy as ransom. Rock goes to Geese's former right hand, Billy Kane, who reveals that the items in Geese's legacy include the Sacred Scrolls of Jin, cursed relics which he had preserved despite Geese ordering their destruction before his death. However, the legacy is stolen by an unknown figure. Days later, an invitation is sent out by Franz Stroheim for a new King of Fighters tournament in Second South Town, with the stolen legacy offered as the prize. Rock wins the tournament while Kain and Billy retrieve Marie, but an accident during their reunion leaves Marie injured, and Rock's emotions cause him to resonate with the scrolls and become possessed, transforming into Fallen Rock (フォールンロック). During the battle, Rock and Billy experience visions revealing that Geese left Marie to hide her and Rock from his enemies, and that he wanted the scrolls destroyed to protect Rock from their curse, which he was vulnerable to due to Geese being distantly descended from the Jin family. Rock is restored to normal, and having made peace with his past, he decides to follow his own path.

=== The King of Fighters and other games ===
Despite making several cameos in games from The King of Fighters series, Rock was only playable in the spin-off games KOF: Maximum Impact and Maximum Impact 2 for several years. Both games feature Rock entering into King of Fighters tournaments developed in Southtown prior to the events of Mark of the Wolves. In spite of his father's ways, Rock is a warm, friendly and compassionate young man, possessing Terry's strong sense of justice and heroism. Every day, Rock fights off his evil side and tries to get out of the shadow of his father. He is the middle term between Geese's excessive evil and Terry's excessive festive personality. Rock is also a very compassionate man, offering to help those in need, such as helping Hotaru Futaba to find her older brother. He also tends to be very uncomfortable and nervous around women, having been raised by men nearly all of his life. Rock makes his first playable appearance in a mainline King of Fighters title in The King of Fighters XIV, being added to the game via post-launch downloadable content. However his canonical first participation on the team-based tournament is in The King of Fighters XV, where he is a new leader of the DLC Team Garou.

Rock also appears in the 2006 original net animation The King of Fighters: Another Day. In the second episode Rock finds Lien Neville fighting Billy Kane, Geese's former right-hand man, in the Geese Tower. As Lien is about to be killed, Rock saves her, which enrages Billy as he cannot believe that he is Geese's son. As Billy attacks Rock, Lien shoots a laser that takes Billy out of the tower. The first seven volumes from the manhua The King of Fighters 2003 by Wing Yen features a short chapter from Garou: Mark of the Wolves based on Rock's training with Terry and their eventual fight in the semifinals which ends with the teenager's victory and follows with his battle against Grant.

A young Rock appears in the 2017 webseries, The King of Fighters: Destiny. In episode eleven, Rock meets Terry at a coffee shop. He is caught by a worker attempting to steal food, so he pretends that Terry is his father to escape trouble. After learning that the boy has no one to raise him, Terry promises to adopt Rock as his son after he defeats Geese. Terry's display of kindness towards Rock also convinces Angelina to stop herself from poisoning him.

Rock also appears as a playable character in the crossover video games NeoGeo Battle Coliseum and Capcom vs. SNK 2.

Rock is featured in The King of Fighters All Star, and makes a cameo in the King of Fighters Stadium stage in Super Smash Bros. Ultimate.

== Reception ==
Game Type magazine praised Rock and Terry's relationship as they really seem like son and father and wondered whether or not Terry's love interest Blue Mary would end up joining them. However, they lamented the game ending on a cliffhanger with Rock joining Kain and leaving Terry's side despite their bond. Screen Rant said that one of the several reasons KOF fans want to see the Garou sequel is because of Rock's unfinished story which was famous in general. When SNK was "revived" thanks to the return of KOF after years with The King of Fighters XIV and Samurai Showdown, SNK fans saw potential in the development of the Fatal Fury sequel. As another reference to Garou's unfinished story, SNK Heroines had Terry Bogard's ending be a nightmare of Rock killing him by throwing him from a cliff like Terry accidentally did with Geese indicating Oda's desire to continue the narrative as if he was traumatized like Terry. This led to more wonders to fans whether or not Rock's story could be continued in the future.

GameRant regarded Rock as the weakest character of Garou: Mark of the Wolves as a result of the handling of his special moves and thus called him as having one of the biggest glow ups in gaming thanks to SNK's rehandling of the character in The King of Fighters XV where he became one of the strongest members from the cast. In a preview from Fatal Fury: City of the Wolves, Destructoid claimed he still felt like the Rock from Garou and is notable for inheriting more of Terry's moves. The Outer Heaven praised his reprisal of Geese's old techniques like the Reppuken but with air variations and how his Raging Storm is as iconic as Geese's. In regards to moves taken from Terry, the writer noted Rock took Terry's High Angle Gesyer from The King of Fighters 2002 as Terry also had replaced that with his Buster Wolf. Griffin Pautu voicing him in the English dub was noted to be nostalgic for Insomniac's Spider-Man. In regards to his role in the story, Outerheaven believed more of Rock's lore will be revealed and for this the rest of the game's cast will be important, citing Kim's sons and Gato as key figures. Anime News Network felt the mixture of Rock and new Terry moves like the Power Geyser helped to give the character good game design as he keeps showing signs of his father and adoptive father through his gameplay. In regards to the character's life, GeneracionXbox believes that his relationship with Terry is still stable despite having abandoned him favor of Kain as his uncle motivated with the idea of finding his missing mother in the end of Garou: Mark of the Wolves. While liking the imported moves from Garou, the writer enjoyed that Rock could now perform the Power Geyser. GameReactor asked Yasyuki Oda in anticipation but the planner decided to leave it ambiguous. Lablelling him and Terry as SNK's "biggest stars", GameRant said that Rock's design appeared to be recycled from The King of Fighters XV with few differences and enhanced. According to Sensatez, City of the Wolves might have a heavy emphasis about Rock's relationship with Terry, as he will try to stay loyal to his adoptive father despite having abandoned him. They also teased the chance of Rock and Terry becoming enemies in a tower mirroring the final fight between Terry and Geese from Real Bout Fatal Fury.

Gmnetwork referred to him as "One of the most requested and popular characters in SNK's fighting game history" which made his appearance in XIV appealing to fans especially since he has been missing from several SNK games despite being the new lead of Fatal Fury and having a striking story and gameplay. Destructoid referred to Rock as the most impressive based on his popularity in SNK games in general. He saw his XIV interested and looked forward to use his counter moves he inherited from Geese while also referring to his original Garou low-tier character. Den of Geek found Rock's debut in KOF's main series with The King of Fighters XIV interesting due to the fact in this timeline his father is alive unlike in the Fatal Fury one. Rock's revelation as a DLC was leaked by fans; this angered Oda who wanted to surprise fans with the official trailer. Nevertheless, Oda hoped the fans would enjoy playing as him. In November 2019, mangaka Itokatsu known for writing Silver Nina made her own sketch of Rock in tribute of the anniversary of Mark of the Wolves.

In regards to Rock's inclusion as DLC in The King of Fighters XV, Screen Rant regarded Team Garou as the best DLC in the entire game for coming for different eras of the company with Rock making his first canonical appearance in a main KOF game in contrast to the returning B. Jenet and Gato, making it a highlight for him due to his few appearances in KOF games, appearing only in spin-offs. The Gamer set Rock as "One of the most popular characters in SNK's lineage" when demanding his role as playable character KOF XV, citing his popularity in Garou and KOF XIV thanks to his mixtures of Terry and Geese's moves. PCInvasion was surprised by Rock's revelation in KOF XV as DLC considering the young fighter as appealing as the iconic Terry Bogard. The fact that Geese Howard's team would also be DLC was also the subject of praise for the potential it gives.
