= Samurai Shodown (2019 video game) =

2019 video game

- Developer: KOF Studio
- Publishers: JP: SNK; Athlon Games (PlayStation 4 & Xbox One); Taito (Arcade); Deep Silver (Nintendo Switch); Netflix Games (Android & iOS)
- Director: Nobuyuki Kuroki
- Producer: Yasuyuki Oda
- Designers: Hidetoshi Ishizawa; Yuji Watanabe; Kaito Soranaka
- Programmer: Masanori Tsuji
- Artists: Nobuyuki Kuroki; Yumi Saji
- Composers: Hiroshi Yamazoe; Masato Horiuchi; Hideki Asanaka; Mayuko Hino; Naoki Kita; Minori Sasaki; Kensuke Inage; Jun Hoshina
- Series: Samurai Shodown
- Engine: Unreal Engine 4
- Platforms: Arcade; Microsoft Windows; Nintendo Switch; PlayStation 4; Stadia; Xbox One; Xbox Series X/S; Android; iOS
- Release: PlayStation 4, Xbox One: WW: June 25, 2019; JP: June 27, 2019; Arcade: JP: October 24, 2019; Stadia: WW: November 19, 2019; Nintendo Switch: JP: December 12, 2019; WW: February 25, 2020; Microsoft Windows: WW: June 11, 2020 (Epic Games); WW: June 14, 2021 (Steam); Xbox Series X/S: WW: March 16, 2021; Android, iOS: WW: August 29, 2023
- Genre: Fighting
- Modes: Single-player, multiplayer
- Arcade system: Taito Type X3 (NESiCAxLive2)

Samurai Shodown (Note: Known in Japan as Samurai Spirits (サムライスピリッツ, Samurai Supirittsu)) is a 2019 fighting game developed by KOF Studio and published by SNK. The eighth main entry in the Samurai Shodown series, as well as a reboot to the series, it was released for the PlayStation 4, Xbox One, Nintendo Switch, Stadia, Xbox Series X and Series S, Android and iOS via Netflix Games, and Windows. An arcade version was released by Taito.

== Gameplay ==
Samurai Shodown is a 2D fighting game with 3D graphics that uses many elements from past games in the series. It shares similarities with The King of Fighters XIV and SNK Heroines: Tag Team Frenzy.

The controls consists of four buttons: weak, medium, strong blows with weapons and kick. By pressing special combinations, the character can carry out captures, counterattacks, interceptions and evasions. The Rage Gauge is back in the game. It replenishes after each damage taken by the character. A fully filled scale gives access to new abilities. After gaining a full scale, the player can activate the rage mode, which increases the character's strength for a while and opens up the opportunity to inflict a disarming blow to the opponent. During the activation of the fury mode, an explosion occurs, pushing the enemy away and opening him up for attack. After the end of the rage mode, the player is deprived of the opportunity to use the scale until the end of the match.

Each character has a Super Special Move, which deals very powerful damage when hitting an opponent. However, it can only be attempted once during the entire match.

The game uses a trainable artificial intelligence. The player can create his/her own so-called ghost. The AI will observe the player's actions and then try to copy them. In a battle with the player's own ghost, weaknesses in tactics, movement patterns and offensive and defensive habits can be observed, useful for the player's gameplay improvement.

The bloody finishing moves that were absent in the previous titles of the series returned to this game.

== Plot ==
Samurai Shodown takes place in the time period between Samurai Shodown V and the original Samurai Shodown, and has been commonly cited as a reboot of the series.

The game takes place in 1787, during the Tenmei Era of Japanese history. During that period, the entire country is beset by a terrible and looming evil. Fire, ruin and famine ran rampant throughout Japan. Meanwhile, as these events unfold, a sinister cloud envelops the air with a foreboding sense of dread. Shizuka Gozen, the deceased spirit of a young woman who is possessed and trapped in Yomi, (labeled Eternity in the game itself) threatens to destroy Japan. Warriors from all across Japan and beyond the ocean, driven by their own needs and desires, converge to investigate these evil forces and vanquish them.

== Characters ==
Samurai Shodown features a base roster of 16 playable characters, with extra ones available as paid and free downloadable content. Newcomers are listed in bold, guest characters are listed in italics. All third-party guest characters are unavailable on the Netflix version of the game.

Base Roster			Season One	Season Two	Season Three
Charlotte; **Darli Dagger**; Earthquake; Galford; Genjuro Kibagami; Hanzo Hattori	Haohmaru; Jubei Yagyu; Kyoshiro Senryo; Nakoruru; Shiki	Tam Tam; Ukyo Tachibana; **Yashamaru Kurama**; Yoshitora Tokugawa; **Wu-Ruixiang**	Basara; Kazuki Kazama; Rimururu; Shizumaru Hisame^{d}; Wan-Fu	**Gongsun Li**^{d}; Iroha; Mina Majikina; Sogetsu Kazama; **Warden**	**Baiken**; Cham Cham; **Hibiki Takane**; Shirou Tokisada Amakusa

Notes

- **^d**: Free post-launch downloadable character

== Development ==
Samurai Shodown was unveiled at the SNK Investor Relations 2018 IPO conference, being developed by SNK Corporation. The game was published worldwide by Athlon Games. Although a reboot, it is the twelfth main game in the Samurai Shodown series, it is the first mainline entry since 2008's Samurai Shodown Sen.

The development team consists of members who worked on The King of Fighters XIV and SNK Heroines: Tag Team Frenzy. Nobuyuki Kuroki is the director and one of the artists, while Yasuyuki Oda serves as producer. Kuroki has been previously involved with the series through the Samurai Shodown 64 titles. The characters of the game were designed by Yumi Saji.

The internal staff at SNK who worked on the game consisted of 50 to 60 employees, as well as outsourcing some art assets, to form a total of an estimated 200 employees who worked on the game. Some of the reasons for making a new title were the recent focus on the esports community and the many fan requests. The team considered using a realistic art style for the graphics but decided against it because too many fighting games were using it already. Oda has expressed interest in adding guest characters from other franchises. This was realized with guest characters from Tencent (which would later acquiring Athlon's parent company Leyou), Ubisoft, and Arc System Works-produced games.

Due to outdated graphics involving the releases of The King of Fighters XIV and SNK Heroines: Tag Team Frenzy, SNK chairman Zhihui GE had stated that the future SNK fighting games will use Unreal Engine 4 in order to give a better graphical presentation. Samurai Shodown became the first SNK game to use Unreal Engine 4.

First announced for PlayStation 4 in September 2018, the game was later revealed to be a multiplatform title. It was released for the PlayStation 4 and Xbox One worldwide in June 2019 with versions for the Nintendo Switch, Windows and Stadia releasing at a later date. The enhanced version for Xbox Series X/S was revealed during Tokyo Game Show 2020 for a Q4 2020 launch. It released on March 16, 2021, and was published by Deep Silver (part of Embracer Group's Koch Media). The version supports a higher frame rate of 120fps. With help from Code Mystics, rollback netcode will be implemented in a late summer 2023 update for PC, PlayStation 4, Xbox One and Xbox Series consoles via GGPO similar to the one The King of Fighters XV uses. The netcode update was finalized on Steam on December 14, 2023 with consoles on May 22, 2024.

== Reception ==
Reception

Aggregate score
Aggregator	Score
Metacritic	PS4: 81/100; XONE: 78/100; PC: 76/100; NS: 75/100

Review scores
Publication	Score
Destructoid	8/10
Edge	8/10
Electronic Gaming Monthly	8.5/10
Game Informer	7.75/10
GameRevolution	4/5
GameSpot	8/10
IGN	8.2/10

Samurai Shodown has received generally favorable reviews, the PlayStation 4, Xbox One, PC, and Nintendo Switch versions earning a Metacritic score of 81, 78, 76, and 75 respectively. Den of Geek gave the game 3.5 out of 5 stars, and commented that Samurai Shodown "is a fighting game that's incredibly solid in its core gameplay and looks swell enough, but it sadly feels like it's lacking because there's little else to do."

The Mercury News called the game a solid revamp for the series, and noted that SNK upgraded the visuals and was as challenging as ever. In their review of the game, GameSpot called the game a great reboot that captured what made the original fun and unique, while also drawing attention to the fact that the single-player experience was somewhat lacking. IGN praised the game's fighting mechanics, and noted that there was an extraordinarily tense style of fighting that is unlike just about anything else in the genre in the current fighting game climate. The PlayStation 4 version was the fourth bestselling game in Japan during its first week of release, selling 16,662 copies. On July 4, SNK reported that first-week shipments plus digital sales totaled 40,606 units.

The game was nominated for "Best Fighting Game" at The Game Awards 2019, and for "Fighting Game of the Year" at the 23rd Annual D.I.C.E. Awards, and won the award for "Game, Franchise Fighting" at the NAVGTR Awards.
