= FF9 =

FF9 may refer to:

- Final Fantasy IX, a 2000 role-playing game originally released on the PlayStation video game console
- F9 (film), alternatively known as Fast & Furious 9, an American action film
- Firefox 9, a web browser version
- Garou: Mark of the Wolves, the ninth installment of the Fatal Fury fighting game series released in 1999
