= Yasuyuki Oda =

Japanese game designer (born 1972)

- 小田 泰之
- Born: 1972 (age 53–54); Hyōgo Prefecture, Japan
- Occupations: Developer for SNK; Former Dimps developer
- Years active: 1993 - 2000; 2000 - present

Yasuyuki Oda (Japanese: 小田 泰之, Hepburn: Oda Yasuyuki) (born 1972) is a Japanese game designer. Oda showed an interest in gaming during his childhood that led him to study animations when growing up. He debuted as a developer for SNK, doing debugs of certain games while being a major planner in Garou: Mark of the Wolves. In 2000, he moved Dimps to later work once again in SNK in the mid-2010s to direct The King of Fighters XIV and other installments from SNK's properties.

== Biography ==
=== Early life and preferences ===
Oda was born in 1972 in Hyōgo Prefecture, Japan. As a child he did not enjoy arcade games and instead played Donkey Kong, Crazy Kong, and Crazy King. He was a fan of virtual reality and aimed towards games that allowed the player to replicate the mecha anime Mobile Suit Gundam. When it comes to anime, he has shown preference to Golden Kamui and Mobile Suit Gundam: Iron-Blooded Orphans while he also enjoys tokusatsu Kamen Rider, most specifically Kamen Rider Agito, and the action RPG Tokyo Mirage. His favorite games involve open-worlds like Assassin's Creed Origins, Horizon Zero Dawn. He believes that Japanese players should try Infamous Second Son while Westerns should play The Legend of Zelda: Breath of the Wild. Oda and SNK game designer Nobuyuki Kuroki studied in the same art school, Osaka Designers' College. There, Oda studied animation.

=== Career ===
Oda was a member of SNK R&D Division 1 from April, 1993 to February, 2000. His first job involved Fatal Fury Special fixing bugs and Art of Fighting 2 as designing the character Takuma Sakazaki which he found challenging based on the fact his torso was not covered by clothing. Blue Mary was a challenge to design as a result of how complex her grapple moves are to animate. During her debut in Fatal Fury 3, not many people on the team knew much information about her fighting style, sambo. At one point, one of the designers working on Blue Mary, Youichiro Soeda, used Oda as a training dummy to show off some of the attacks he had in mind to the rest of the team. Oda joked that he suffered major wounds after being used by the character designer. Though not a developer, Oda was impressed by The King of Fighters '94 due to the game's capabilities which were outstanding when it was released.

He had minor involving within the game The King of Fighters '95 and Kizuna Encounter. Both Kuroki and Oda wondered what type of hero would succeed Terry Bogard in Fatal Fury's latest game, Garou: Mark of the Wolves. While they were not confident with Rock Howard, they still decided to make him as the new protagonist. Oda feels proud for his contributions to the Fatal Fury series due to adding the game mechanic of cancelling "Super" attacks. In 2000, Oda left SNK to join Dimps.

As part of Dimps, Oda was the battle designer of Street Fighter IV and worked in the crossover Street Fighter X Tekken. Oda would later direct The King of Fighters XIV after returning to SNK. This was his first contribution to the franchise, leading a younger staff. During Oda's first employment at SNK, games like Virtua Fighter motivated him to make a 3D game after his departure. When Oda returned to SNK, he decided to transition the King of Fighters series from 2D to 3D though the adaption of some characters was more difficult than others. Despite initial issues with the online mode and other features from the game, Yasuyuki Oda stated the fan response to The King of Fighters XIV was positive especially after fixing these issues. As a result, he thinks The King of Fighters XV is possible but the company wants to focus on other franchises too. In making the arcade port of this game, Oda was inspired by Taito's NESiCAxLive 2 based on its capabilities. Oda stated Leona Heidern and Kyo Kusanagi are his favorite characters in The King of Fighters series. Oda noted that while researching new characters for KOF XIV, Kyo's moves avoided stereotypes like Japanese sumo wrestlers to produce more variety within the cast, which included characters of multiple nationalities. Oda added that they "Kyo-ify" the new members to produce originality in the game.

Following the success of The King of Fighters XIV, SNK decided to develop a more light-hearted game solely focused on female fighters, SNK Heroines: Tag Team Frenzy. Oda stated that while initial mentions of the game made the mechanics sound more simplified than previous games, the team also worked highly in a complex system which would attract experts in the genre. Oda returned as producer for Samurai Showdown due to major feedback. Oda aimed each character to play unique and showed an interest in adding a guest character from The Lord of the Rings: Aragorn. Samurai Shodown was one of the series Oda wanted to develop from a long time based on its weaponry usage.

== Works ==
- Fatal Fury Special (1993) - Debug
- Art of Fighting 2 (1994) - Takuma Sakazaki pixel art
- The King of Fighters '95 (1995) - Special thanks
- Garou: Mark of the Wolves (2000) - Planner
- Street Fighter IV (2009) - Battle designer
- Super Street Fighter IV (2010) - Game designer
- Super Street Fighter IV: Arcade Edition (2011) - Director
- Street Fighter X Tekken (2012) - Game designer
- The King of Fighters XIV (2016) - Director
- SNK Heroines: Tag Team Frenzy (2018) - Producer
- Samurai Shodown (2019) - Game Division Studio 1 Producer
- Super Smash Bros. Ultimate (2019) - Original game supervisor (Terry Bogard DLC)
- The King of Fighters XV (2022) - Producer
- Fatal Fury: City of the Wolves (2025) - Producer
