= FF7 =

FF7 may refer to:

- Final Fantasy VII, a 1997 video game
  - Final Fantasy VII Remake, a 2020 remake of the 1997 video game
- Fast & Furious 7, a 2015 film
- Fatal Fury: City of the Wolves, a 2025 video game
