= Garou: Mark of the Wolves =

1999 video game

- Developer: SNK
- Publishers: SNK; Agetec (DC)
- Producers: Hiroshi Matsumoto; Seigo Ito; T. Tsukamoto
- Designers: I. Higemura; Yasuyuki Oda
- Artists: D. Takagi; M. Hirano; Nobuyuki Kuroki
- Composers: Akihiro Uchida; Masato Horiuchi; Yasuhiro Naka
- Series: Fatal Fury
- Platforms: Arcade, Neo Geo AES, Dreamcast, PlayStation 2, Xbox 360
- Release: November 26, 1999: Arcade; WW: November 26, 1999 Neo Geo AES; WW: February 25, 2000 Dreamcast; JP: September 27, 2001; NA: November 23, 2001 PlayStation 2; JP: June 30, 2005 Xbox 360; WW: June 24, 2009
- Genre: Fighting
- Modes: Single-player, multiplayer
- Arcade system: Neo Geo MVS

Garou: Mark of the Wolves (Note: Japanese: 餓狼マークオブザウルブズ, Hepburn: Garō Māku obu za Urubuzu; lit. "Hungry Wolf: Mark of the Wolves") is a 1999 fighting game developed and published by SNK for the Neo Geo arcade and home platforms. It was ported as Fatal Fury: Mark of the Wolves to the Dreamcast. It is the sixth main installment in the Fatal Fury series. Though released a year after Real Bout Fatal Fury 2: The Newcomers (1998), the game is canonically a sequel to Real Bout Fatal Fury (1995), taking place a decade after the events of that game. Ten years after combatant Terry Bogard defeated crimelord Geese Howard in The King of Fighters tournament, he and his adoptive son, Rock Howard, enter into a South Town tournament known as Maximum Mayhem to learn about the Howard legacy. The game features 14 characters, all new, with the exception of Terry Bogard. As a fighting game, the game employs two innovative mechanics, the first known as T.O.P (Tactical Offensive Position), which provides players with powerful attacks when their health is within a certain range (chosen by the player before the start of the match), and the second known as Just Defend, which provides players with various advantages if they block attacks at precise moments.

The game was designed as an overhaul of the Fatal Fury series, as event planner Yasuyuki Oda found the franchise outdated when compared with SNK's IP, The King of Fighters. In order to reboot the series, a new protagonist, Rock Howard, was created, serving as the basis for Terry's redesign and the rest of the 12 characters, two of which are also bosses. Yasuyuki Oda and Nobuyuki Kuroki served as the main illustrators and character designers. The fighting system was created to be accessible to newcomers. The game was ported to several consoles, with the Xbox 360 port being given an online mode, whereas more modern ports aimed to give improved netcode.

Garou: Mark of the Wolves became one of SNK's most famous fighting games of all time for its new fighting engine and new cast, which appealed to both newcomers and returning players. Often compared with Capcom's acclaimed Street Fighter III due to the new cast and visuals, the game has frequently appeared in lists of SNK's best fighting games. Ending in a cliffhanger, the game's narrative was briefly explored in KOF: Maximum Impact among other KOF games, though no plans for sequels were conceived after two years of development. Eventually, the sequel Fatal Fury: City of the Wolves was released on April 24, 2025.

== Gameplay ==
Gameplay screenshot showcasing a match between B. Jenet and Rock Howard (left). As Rock's health is reaching his T.O.P., the player will have access to Desperation Moves when reaching it.

Gameplay in Mark of the Wolves is set on a single two-dimensional movement plane, removing the "lane" system from prior Fatal Fury games that allowed characters to move between the foreground and background. The game introduces a new mechanic called the "Tactical Offense Position" (T.O.P.), indicated by a highlighted area on the characters' life gauges. When the gauge reaches this area, the character enters the T.O.P. mode, granting the player's character the ability to use a T.O.P. attack, gradual life recovery, and increased attack damage; players can set which portion of their life bar activates the T.O.P. mode before the match begins. The game also introduces the "Just Defend" system, which rewards the player who successfully blocks an attack at the last moment with a small amount of health recovery and the ability to immediately counterattack out of block stun.

Similar to previous titles, the player is given a fighting rank after every round. If the player manages to win all rounds from the Arcade Mode with at least an "AAA" rank, they will face the boss Kain R. Heinlein, who unlocks an ending after he is defeated. If the requirements are not met, then Grant will be the final boss, and there will be no special endings. Additionally, through Arcade Mode, before facing Grant, the player will face a mid-boss, which can be any character from the cast, depending on the character they use.

In addition to the standard Story mode, the console versions of the game include a second single-player mode, "Survival", in which the player must defeat as many opponents as possible while only regaining a limited amount of health after each battle. By completing each mode with different characters, the player will unlock new content in an in-game gallery, such as character portraits and promotional artwork.

== Plot and characters ==
Ten years after crime lord Geese Howard's death, South Town has remained peaceful as Terry Bogard continues to raise Geese's son Rock Howard. The two suddenly receive a personal invitation to participate in a new King of Fighters tournament, the first to be held since Geese's death, dubbed "King of Fighters: Maximum Mayhem". Upon seeing in the invitation that the host also has information about Rock's deceased mother, Marie, they travel to the neighboring city of Second Southtown to participate in the tournament, as do several other fighters, many of whom have ties to the previous tournaments' combatants. Mark of the Wolves features 14 playable characters. Terry Bogard is the only returning character from the previous Fatal Fury games, though many of the new cast are relatives or disciples of other characters from past entries. As revealed in the featurette Memories of Stray Wolves, Rock is the winner of the tournament, joining the host Kain after learning he is related to his mother. Kain created the new tournament to attract his nephew and discover the meaning behind Geese's legacy.

- B. Jenet
- Freeman
- Gato
- Grant (Note: Boss character)
- Hokutomaru
- Hotaru Futaba
- Kain R. Heinlein
- Kevin Rian
- Kim Dong-Hwan
- Kim Jae-Hoon
- Marco Rodrigues
- Rock Howard
- Terry Bogard
- Tizoc

== Development ==
Garou: Mark of the Wolves' development team was formed during the NeoGeo era of SNK. Several artists worked on it, as SNK was developing two new installments based on the Fatal Fury series: the 3D fighting game remake of the first game, Fatal Fury: Wild Ambition and Garou: Mark of the Wolves. Hiroaki Hashimoto was a minor artist, as he moved to become the main artist of Wild Ambition and the new game Buriki One, while Tonko remained as the main illustrator for the sequences and character illustrations. Meanwhile, Shinkiro did not return to work on either of these installments because he was busy illustrating The King of Fighters. Artist Nobuyuki Kuroki was in charge of making character animations. According to planner Yasuyuki Oda, the gameplay was changed to avoid conventional gameplay conventions. As they feared a negative response, the concept behind this game was "a game that's snappy, without getting tiresome". A variety of fighting system features were developed for this game. The Break Moves were inspired by Real Bout Fatal Fury, but because the Real Bout series was predicated on longer recovery frames on hit and block, it was not something Oda was able to realize until Garou: Mark of the Wolves. There was an original idea for Tizoc to avoid break moves, but there were regrets in retrospect. The system known as "Just Defense" was conceived as a method that synchs with the returning Guard Crush, and after adding various additional elements, it took the form seen in the finished product. With regards to recovering the player's health bar, the idea was to think of it as being able to earn a breather via efficient and accurate defense. T.O.P. Attacks came about through wanting to implement "an additional new game system that would not require the player to learn new commands", making the game more accessible. However, it was tricky to design this system, as it was a curbing phenomenon where the more they modified and tuned the system, the less differentiation there would be with the T.O.P. meter. It was difficult to set power values that'd satisfy the widest swathe of players. There was a careful idea with balancing strong and weak attacks. When it came to special moves, SNK removed the chain combo system and created new means of combos. This led to the idea of consecutive specials, which served as a major contrast to previous Fatal Fury games devoted to normal-to-special flow.

Multiple changes to Garou: Mark of the Wolves were made to show a bigger difference from previous games, due to most characters being new. The King of Fighters is commonly associated with Kyo Kusanagi and Iori Yagami from the series with the same name, rather than Fatal Fury characters. As a result, the new tournament was dubbed "Maximum Mayhem King of Fighters" to give a new tension to associate the new characters by giving the city of Southtown more emphasis in the narrative. The event planner was Kim Ken, who was in charge of the test locations of Garou: Mark of the Wolves. They ended on November 3, 1999, and feedback resulted in adjustments to the game. The staff found developing the game challenging regarding how they handled their respective parts while working together. Dan was a subprogrammer in charge of enemy AIs as well as Rock, Don Juan, Hotaru, Hokutomaru, and Grant. Rock Howard's Deadly Rave move was originally hard to do during location tests. Despite being a sequel to Real Bout Fatal Fury, staff member M Hirano regarded Garou as a completely new series due to the usage of new characters. The backgrounds were made to look as Neo Geo fitting as possible. "TASHIBOO" is famous for being the effects craftsman of the Garou team, who had been creating those effects for five years. When he was a rookie, he created the Power Wave in Real Bout Fatal Fury for the lead Terry Bogard. Oda was impressed by TASHIBOO's work and hired him to do the effects for Garou. The handicap system, which was met with mixed reviews during the location test at Neo Geo Land, was kept. In response to rumors that Geese Howard was a hidden character, the SNK staff denied it. While the SNK team created the cast together, Oda was in charge of the final call, with artist Tonko making the main illustrations for each character's profile.

=== Cast and moves ===
Sketches of the redesigned Terry (left) and the protagonist Rock; Being the protagonist, he was the first character to serve as the basis for the entire cast.

Rock's character and entire personality served as the main basis for the game. This led to the creation of supporting characters like B. Jenet or Terry Bogard's redesign. Since Rock was the protagonist, the cast gave full attention to him. Nobyuki Kuroki tried giving him his own style of cool, which he hoped would attract gamers. The character of Rock Howard was created by Nobuyuki Kuroki in 1998. Both he and Yasuyuki Oda wondered what type of hero would succeed Terry Bogard in Fatal Fury's latest game, Garou: Mark of the Wolves. While they were not confident in Rock, they still decided to make him the new protagonist. Rock was designed to contrast previous 'masculine' Fatal Fury characters by giving him a more bishonen appearance, something Nobuyuki Kuroki felt the sequel needed to balance the cast, which was an issue he felt Real Bout suffered. Similarly, Hotaru was given a moe-inspired look to balance the playable characters. Hotaru did not have much personality, which was hard to convey until the decision was made to emphasize how she seeks her older brother. Meanwhile, B. Jenet was designed after her sex appeal, with the personality of an older sister who would often frequent bars.

Terry was also redesigned, labeled as "cool" by the SNK staff because they thought Terry's previous look had become outdated. It was inspired by the style KOF characters have, like Kyo Kusanagi, who tends to wear a high school uniform over a traditional fighting outfit. Another reason for the change of clothing was to symbolize Terry's more peaceful personality, now displayed in Mark of the Wolves. The story was written with a cliffhanger from the get-go, thus leaving open the possibility for a potential sequel. New moves were created for both Rock and B. Jenet before development was put on hold. Kengo Asai, who previously worked on Voltage Fighter Gowcaizer, Money Puzzle Exchanger and The Last Blade series, was also involved in the development of the game. Oda called Terry's strongest new move Buster Wolf to fit the Showa Era rather than God Geyser Twin. The design required a certain amount of ruggedness, but Oda was careful to keep him from looking too old-fashioned. Regarding his moves, Oda put together his kit with the intention of producing the "ultimate version of Terry". For this game, the intent was to make 35-year-old Terry feel a little more subdued, so he paid attention to those areas, but he still somersaults when he jumps, and goes into a full sprint when he dashes, so he hasn't really lost a step. He hopes Terry maintains his good health for more games. Gato primarily focuses on kick techniques and was inspired by Xiangfei. Meanwhile, B. Jenet was based on Alfred. The staff was concerned with Tizoc's size and mask, while Marco was given a vague sex appeal. The two Taekwondo users were given contrasting personalities but had to be given similar designs as a result of time constraints. Hokutomaru was given the air of a brat, with a small air of coolness, with moves meant to attract players. Freeman gave the designer nervous feelings due to similarities with another character. The two bosses were purposely illustrated to look strong.

=== Release ===
Garou: Mark of the Wolves was originally released for Japanese arcades on November 26, 1999. It was first ported to the Neo Geo on February 25, 2000, and to the Dreamcast on September 21, 2001. In a popularity poll by SNK for the release of Garou: Mark of the Wolves, Rock topped the ranking, and Terry ranked second. First announced at Tokyo Game Show 2001, the Dreamcast port was re-released on May 23, 2002, under the label of "SNK Best". The original Dreamcast version was the only port released in North America on November 23, 2001, being one of the last games for the system in that region. In that version, it was renamed Fatal Fury: Mark of the Wolves.

A PlayStation 2 port of the game was released in Japan on June 30, 2005, but was not released in North America. This port was re-released in the title of "NeoGeo Online Collection" and a "Limited Edition" of the same title on June 30. On June 21, 2007, it was once again released as "SNK Best Collection". The title also came to Xbox Live Arcade on June 24, 2009. In promoting Garou: Mark of the Wolves, SNK has used machine translations to describe the game, which led to poorly done translations involving the main character. GiantBomb considered this a common issue seen in SNK history comparable to the iconic "All your base are belong to us".

The PlayStation 4 and PlayStation Vita ports were later released, the latter for PlayStation Network in December 2016. A Nintendo Switch port would be released by Hamster Corporation on May 11, 2017, digitally under the ACA Neo Geo label, marking the first time the game was available on a Nintendo system. The Xbox One would later receive its own port of Garou on August 16, 2018, under the ACA Neo Geo banner. This version — a straight, barebones port of the original arcade game — was also released for the PlayStation 4 on the same day, separate from the online-capable version that had already been released for the console more than two years prior.

In 2020, GOG, Steam, PlayStation 4, and PlayStation Vita versions of Garou featured rollback netcode from an update by Code Mystics, who also added their port of the game, replacing DotEmu's port that was released on Steam. Among bugfixes in the Steam version, the PlayStation 4 port also had Automatic or user-defined netcode settings.

== Reception ==
Reception

Aggregate score
Aggregator	Score
Metacritic	SDC: 86/100; X360: 77/100

Review scores
Publication	Score
Electronic Gaming Monthly	8/10
GameSpot	8.5/10
IGN	9/10
TouchArcade	iOS: 4.5/5
Meristation	8/10
GameRevolution	B+
TeamXbox	7.5/10

Award
Publication	Award
GameSpot	Best Fighting Game (2001)

Critical response to Garou: Mark of the Wolves was positive. GameSpot referred to it as both one of SNK's last great Neo-Geo games, as well as one of the last great games for the Sega Dreamcast ever. Meristation said the game innovated the fighting engine of Fatal Fury, with both T.O.P and Just Defense standing out as good features in the review. Destructoid referred to Garou as "one of the greatest games of all-time", and called it "essentially a flawless fighting game", praising its sprite animations, musical score, detailed stages, fighting mechanics, and likable cast. However, they criticized the PS4 and Xbox One releases for being straight arcade ports that had no online mode or other extra features contained in the Xbox 360 version. Comparisons with Street Fighter III were common: Game Revolution remarked how both games were alike in that they each had redrawn sprites, new fighting mechanics, and featured almost entirely new casts of characters, in addition to likening the Just Defense system to Street Fighter III's parry system. They also praised its character animations, musical score, tight controls, and depth as well. 3DJuegos called it the Street Fighter III of SNK due to the largely new cast and new game mechanics, as well as one of SNK's best fighting games ever created. Like other aforementioned reviewers, they too praised the fighting mechanics, stage design, and musical score, but warned against playing the mobile versions with touch controls rather than a standard controller. IGN also compared the game style with Street Fighter II but lamented the poor netcode. Vidaextra found the Just Defended command similar to the Parries from Street Fighter III, as both can offer the player strategic defensive methods to win their fights.

In its review of the Dreamcast port, IGN praised the depth of Garou's gameplay mechanics, such as the T.O.P system and Just Defense, as well as the character animations and special effects. They said that while the character sprites themselves weren't as detailed as those in Guilty Gear X, their animations were among the best in a 2D fighting game. They also drew comparison with another contemporary fighting game, Marvel vs Capcom 2, in praising the visual appeal of special effects during combat. However, they criticized the game for its character balance, claiming some characters were a bit better than others, as well as criticizing its stages, which they called "a bit plain", and the lack of modes and longevity within the game. They said that the game lacked modes to appeal to the average gamer's incentive like Street Fighter Alpha 3's World Tour Mode. Despite these criticisms, IGN said the game was nevertheless "definitely a worthy purchase". TouchArcade was surprised by the game's accessibility as the T.O.P. system made the special moves easy to use, with each character bringing their own unique gameplay mechanics, but still found the iOS port to have complicated buttons. Though the Xbox port was notable for having an online mode, it suffered criticism for being a bit sluggish. The Xbox version was also criticized for unfitting controls to the point that TeamXbox instead recommended newcomers to try the Street Fighter series. The lack of modes was another issue raised by Meristation. PCMag, in its review of the PC Steam port, enjoyed the gameplay and art design but lamented the poor framerate. They compared the Just Defense system with Street Fighter III's parry system, criticizing it for being less rewarding than Capcom's take. Nintendo Life enjoyed the familiarity of the new characters, such as Kim's sons, Rock being a hybrid of Geese Howard and Terry Bogard, and heroine B. Jennet. They compared the tactical feel of the gameplay to Street Fighter III and found the visuals as striking as the previous Real Bout subseries. On a more negative note, TeamXbox criticized the lack of a notable storyline, as the characters have few interactions to explain their motivations to participate in the fighting tournament.

In Japan, Game Machine listed Garou: Mark of the Wolves in their January 1, 2000 issue as being the most successful arcade game of the month. In GameSpot's article "The History of SNK", Garou and The King of Fighters '99: Evolution were described as one of the best fighting games on the Dreamcast. GameSpot named Mark of the Wolves the "Best Fighting Game of 2001". It was also nominated for the publication's annual "Best Game No One Played" and "Best Dreamcast Game" prizes among console games, but lost these, respectively, to Victorious Boxers: Ippo's Road to Glory and Phantasy Star Online. It was also nominated for "Outstanding Fighting Game Sequel" by the National Academy of Video Game Trade Reviewers, but lost to Dead or Alive 3. ONE37pm listed it as the 11th best SNK game, calling it accessible, refreshing, and appealing enough to compete with Capcom's acclaimed Street Fighter III: 3rd Strike. Arc System Works developers also called Garou one of their favorite video games. Despite regarding it as one of the best SNK games released, the game had poor visibility as the Dreamcast version was only released in Japan and North America, while the PlayStation 2 port took a few years to be released and wasn't available in all regions. They also regarded it as a classic game still outstanding for modern gamers. Polygon acclaimed the highly regarded spritework, which many feel is only matched by games such as 3rd Strike and The King of Fighters XIII.

=== Legacy ===
During the KOF Year-End Party 2005 fan event, artist Falcoon mentioned that a sequel to Garou: Mark of the Wolves for Neo Geo was around 70% complete. Oda remained at SNK until production of the sequel was well underway, before moving to Dimps. According to Kuroki and designer Naoto Abe, the scenario for the sequel was fully written and work on the characters, including new ones, was finished. However, the original SNK dissolved in 2001 during development, leaving the project unfinished and shelved. Between 2016 and 2020, SNK unveiled production artwork and sprites of the characters from the cancelled sequel. In 2022, two CDs belonging to a former SNK developer were discovered containing material for the cancelled sequel.

Though Akihiko Ureshino has not talked about working on the upcoming Fatal Fury sequel Fatal Fury: City of the Wolves, he sees the Terry from Garou: Mark of the Wolves as a more fatherly character, having issues adopting Rock Howard, and trying his best to write them together in the spin-off KOF: Maximum Impact, which takes place before Garou by his own request. Ureshino laments not being able to write his own Fatal Fury novels, as SNK had been restricting Garou novelizations since they had already teamed up with Kodansha and were planning to develop an official story called Garou Densetsu Seiden on a large scale, whether as a comic or a novel. Ureshino thinks that was probably why he had approached Gamest Z Bunko before this about a novelization of Fatal Fury 3 and had been turned down.

The King of Fighters 2003, The King of Fighters XI, as well as other KOF games feature Terry's Mark of the Wolves design, alongside other characters like Gato, Tizoc, and B. Jenet.

In 2022, a new Fatal Fury game was officially announced. Titled Fatal Fury: City of the Wolves, the sequel is be 2.5D, similar to other contemporary SNK fighting games, and will continue the story of Mark of the Wolves while also bringing back characters from earlier Fatal Fury games. City of the Wolves was released in April 2025.
