= Terry Bogard =

Video game character

- Fatal Fury and The King of Fighters character
- Terry Bogard by Eisuke Ogura in The King of Fighters XIII, in his Fatal Fury 2 design
- First appearance: Fatal Fury: King of Fighters; (1991)
- Created by: Takashi Nishiyama
- Designed by: Yasuyuki Oda (Garou: Mark of the Wolves)
- Voiced by: English: Mark Hildreth (Fatal Fury anime trilogy, KOF XII); Michael Allan Schneider (Street Fighter 6, Fatal Fury: City of the Wolves); Japanese: Satoshi Hashimoto (Fatal Fury 2 – Neo Geo Heroes: Ultimate Shooting); Takashi Kondō (The King of Fighters XIV onwards); Chiaki Takahashi (SNK Heroines: Tag Team Frenzy (as Cutie Terry)); Kazukiyo Nishikiori (Fatal Fury anime trilogy); Tsutomu Kashiwakura (young; Fatal Fury: Legend of the Hungry Wolf); Takeshi Kusao (Dengeki Bunko drama CD)
- Portrayed by: David Leitch (2010 film)

In-universe information
- Fighting style: Street Fighting
- Origin: United States
- Nationality: American

Terry Bogard (Japanese: テリー・ボガード, Hepburn: Terī Bogādo) is a character and the protagonist of the Fatal Fury series created by SNK. Introduced in Fatal Fury: King of Fighters (1991), he is an American fighter who enters the worldwide "The King of Fighters" tournaments to combat his adopted father's murderer, Geese Howard. Following Geese's death in Real Bout Fatal Fury, Terry becomes the guardian of Geese's son Rock Howard, the series' new protagonist. He is also a regular character in the crossover video game series The King of Fighters, where he continues participating in tournaments with Andy and Joe among other Fatal Fury characters. He has also been a guest character in other games, including the Capcom vs. SNK series, Arika's Fighting EX Layer, Street Fighter 6 and Nintendo's crossover fighting game Super Smash Bros. Ultimate. In addition to video games, Terry has appeared in anime films based on Fatal Fury, and manga serialized in Comic Bom Bom.

SNK designer Takashi Nishiyama created Terry based on a scrapped design he used in Capcom's Street Fighter before moving to the company. A major redesign for Garou: Mark of the Wolves was made by Yasuyuki Oda to reflect on his more peaceful life with Rock as the game takes place a decade after Geese's death. His gameplay was based on traditional fighting game characters which kept being balanced with each installment. Terry's popularity led SNK to create a female version of him for the 2018 game SNK Heroines: Tag Team Frenzy.

Publications have praised the character's personality and movesets and how he was developed from Fatal Fury to The King of Fighters as a wandering fighter dealing with revenge, although the female Terry saw mixed reception. Terry has become an icon for not just SNK, but fighting games in general, appearing prominently on SNK and non-SNK merchandise, often making rivalries with Street Fighter character Ken Masters both in crossovers and his iconic guest appearance in Street Fighter 6. His role in the Fatal Fury original video animations and movie were also the subject of praise with director Masami Obari's own take on Terry's chi-based techniques influencing his style in the games.

== Creation ==
The Street Fighter character who served as the basis for Terry.

Terry Bogard originates in the development of Capcom's fighting game Street Fighter (1987), for which developers Hiroshi Matsumoto and Takashi Nishiyama created a concept for a Caucasian man wearing a leather jacket; the concept was not used in Street Fighter, as they decided to make the main playable character a dougi-clad karateka name Ryu instead. They still wanted to use this concept in a game; after their move to SNK, they implemented him in Fatal Fury: King of Fighters (1991) as a playable character. His inclusion in Street Fighter 6 was done since Nishiyama had created the first Street Fighter during his time at Capcom and believed adding him alongside Mai Shiranui would fit in the game. However, all of Terry's special moves were created by Capcom designers. Terry and Street Fighter character Ken Masters have had past dialogue between them, so they were very conscious of their relationship when they created them.

=== Portrayal ===
One of the earliest thoughts about Terry's personality was that he is a calm man despite seeking revenge. In the making of the series, Terry and his brother Andy were characterized as the heroic leads, contrasting with the comical Joe Higashi. For the release of the Fatal Fury 3 game, Terry was quickly added because of his popularity with fans. When it came to his moves, SNK had different ideas and altered the special moves he could perform. While Terry has an easygoing personality, he is fueled with the thirst of revenge with killing Geese Howard in most games. However, in Real Bout Fatal Fury, revenge is not necessarily Terry's absolute goal, as is clear from the fact that he instinctively reaches out to Geese, who is supposed to be Jeff's enemy. Real Bout Fatal Fury, was made to end the conflict between Terry and his nemesis, Geese Howard. Ureshino believes Terry had no intention of killing Geese and getting revenge, and at most he just wanted to defeat Geese and make Jeff apologize after he died. Ureshino thinks Terry's feelings were expressed when he instinctively reached out his hand to Geese as he was falling off the building. However, Geese refused even that, and selfishly ended his life, abandoning the future of Billy Kane and the connections he had built up.

Although Terry and fellow fighter Blue Mary get along, SNK writer Akihiko Ureshino does not see the two as a romantic couple but instead as a friendly relationship comparable to Robert Garcia and Yuri Sakazaki from Art of Fighting or Athena Asamiya and Sie Kensou from Psycho Soldier because Blue Mary is in doubts about her late boyfriend killed by Geese. However, Ureshino has shown a desire to promote Terry and Mary's relationship in Fatal Fury or The King of Fighters. Terry has been popular with the SNK staff to the point multiple individuals worked on his character's movesets during location tests of Real Bout Fatal Fury 2.

According to Yasuyuki Oda, the phrase The King of Fighters is commonly associated with Kyo Kusanagi and Iori Yagami than Fatal Fury characters. As a result, the new tournament was dubbed "Maximum Mayhem King of Fighters" to give a new tension to associate Terry. Though Terry was created as the lead for all the games, his adoptive son Rock Howard was designed as the new lead character of the Fatal Fury series by Nobuyuki Kuroki in 1998. Both he and Yasuyuki Oda wondered what type of hero would succeed Terry Bogard in Garou: Mark of the Wolves. Rock's character and entire personality served as the main basis for the game. This led to the creation of supporting characters like B. Jenet or Terry Bogard's redesign. Terry became a famous character thanks to KOF and Fatal Fury which earned his fame in Smash. In the Smash games, he became depicted as famous and cultural figure, and he has many different jobs. Ureshino describes the Garou Terry as a childish adult who is lazy most of the time and believes that in a sequel he might be given a more mature personality. When the 35-year-old Terry appeared in KOF: Maximum Impact 2 under the name "Wild Wolf", his character story naturally followed this, and he also earned a living by giving lectures and writing essays, while at the same time showing a fatherly side, worrying about Rock's future, who has been forced to join in his wandering life. His earlier life with Rock is portrayed as similar to the Sakazaki family from Art of Fighting as they are comically worried about their money and fighting style at the same time.

The King of Fighters game was created with the idea of having Terry fighting against Ryo Sakazaki, the lead character from the Art of Fighting series. The King of Fighters protagonist Kyo Kusanagi was also created with this in mind. Though Terry does not have a major role in the Maximum Impact series other than revenge with Billy Kane over Geese's death in Real Bout, game designer Falcoon created the new lead Alba Meira to be Terry's KOF counterpart. SNK said that Terry's great popularity among players made him one of the most used characters for every installment of the series. For The King of Fighters XV, when the staff was finishing Team Hero, creative director Eisuke Ogura wanted to use Terry because he is a disciple of Tung, just like newcomers Meitenkun and Shun’ei. He thought he would be in the best position to watch over them. However, in the end we chose Benimaru Nikaido as a proposal from fellow busy character Kyo Kusanagi, as Benimaru is just good enough to take care of others whereas Kyo was requested by fellow fighter Chizuru Kagura join her team. In the end, Ogura was glad with this decision.

=== Designs ===
Terry as illustrated by Tonko for Garou: Mark of the Wolves was a major redesign to the classic look to fit his more peaceful life.

Terry was designed to fit an American hero, sharing blond hair and represent the country's flag through his clothing which includes red, blue and white, making him easy to recognize. This also includes references to superheroes often seen in Japanese series like mecha protagonists and echo a rise of popularity. The SNK staff described his original design as "the most macho, stand-out, original Terry". Youchiro Soeda was in charge of the animation of most of the characters in the first Fatal Fury. His original appearance was made with the intention that he did not look like a martial artist, contrasting the looks of his brother Andy. His appearance evolves across Fatal Fury; there were two rejected sketches. One involved a design with cowboy boots, a tattoo, and a pendant he had received from an unidentified woman. Nobyuki Kuroki handled Terry's design in the Real Bout titled games. This was mostly because SNK aimed to make Terry's muscles more notable, removing protection from his shoulders. Most of the main King of Fighters games up to The King of Fighters 2002 feature Terry in his Fatal Fury 2 outfit. In XII, his classic outfit was used to remain true to his origins, while color editing was made in order to make him look like the Pokémon character Ash Ketchum as a gag. For The King of Fighters XIV, the artists found Terry's new appearance challenging to the point it was remade four times along with changes by his motion actor. Yusuke Amano was the character designer for Terry in this title which he enjoyed due to his personal experience with Terry ever since he played as him in his childhood. With Fatal Fury and The King of Fighters eventually moving from 2D visuals to 3D, the staff was careful to keep his original image intact for gameplay and visual needs.

In Mark of the Wolves, Terry was redesigned with a "cool" look by the SNK staff because they thought his previous appearance had become outdated. Yasuyuki Oda was in charge of this version of Terry with respect to the game design. Regardless of major changes to Terry's most unique traits, SNK wanted to keep the original stars drawn in the back of his jacket. Another reason for the change of clothing was to symbolize Terry's more peaceful personality now displayed in Mark of the Wolves. The King of Fighters 2003 and The King of Fighters XI feature the "Mark of the Wolves" design. In Maximum Impact and Maximum Impact 2 Terry wears both recurring outfits which bothered Ureshino. This is mostly due to the age difference Terry and Rock has as Terry is 24 years old in Fatal Fury and The King of Fighters but 35 in Garou: Mark of the Wolves. Meanwhile, Rock is only 17 Garou: Mark of the Wolves, making the time gap in Maximum Impact not fitting. As a result, even if Rock stands next to him, they look more like brothers than stepfather in KOF. That is why Ureshino feel uncomfortable when the two of them talk in demo scenes and the like. As a result, SNK solved this discomfort by setting Maximum Impact in an alternate timeline where Geese Howard is already dead, making it nearly the Garou: Mark of the Wolves timeline. Meanwhile, XV has Terry in Fatal Fury 2 design as regular and in his Garou design as DLC. While Terry retains his Garou look in City of the Wolves. Players who pre-order Fatal Fury: City of the Wolves will receive an additional costume for Terry based on his appearance in Fatal Fury 2.

While making SNK Heroines: Tag Team Frenzy, SNK staff noted that because Terry was one of the company's most popular characters, his inclusion in the game was necessary even if he had to be redesigned as a woman; this incarnation has feminine clothing options including a variant of his original outfit wherein the FATAL FURY logo on his cap is changed to read "FATAL CUTiE", a cheerleader outfit, and steampunk-inspired clothes. This was not the first time SNK had featured a female version of Terry in a game: in 2003's SNK vs. Capcom: SVC Chaos, he is magically transformed by the Darkstalkers character Demitri Maximoff.

=== Voice actors ===
Starting with Fatal Fury 2 until Neo Geo Heroes: Ultimate Shooting Terry was voiced by Satoshi Hashimoto who also voiced fellow playable character Kim Kaphwan. When he was replaced, Hashimoto said he was happy that his roles were widely recognized by fans and that he highly enjoyed Terry's character. Takashi Kondō replaced Hashimoto for The King of Fighters XIV onward and was very aware of his character's popularity. Kondo first met the character through his childhood when playing the video games that feature him. He described his character as cool due to his demeanor.

For the three animated adaptations of Fatal Fury, the character's role was left to Kazukiyo Nishikiori. In the English dubs of the three works, Terry is voiced by Mark Hildreth. Early in SNK Heroines development, the female Terry was meant to still have a masculine voice, but the decision was reversed following disapproval from the game's sound designers. Despite fears over the voice actresses' deliveries, in the end SNK felt Terry managed to fit in with the cast. Amano believed that SNK was able to explore a more humanistic take on the character through SNK Heroines.

=== Gameplay ===
Terry's fighting style was designed by SNK to make him look cool. It was simply called "Street Fighting" in reference to how Terry improvises his moves and often gives them similar names. For the release of Fatal Fury 3 Terry's air move Rising Tackle (ライジングタックル) was removed in exchange for the Power Dunk (パワーダンク). The Power Dunk was better for the team even though it closely resembled the Rising Tackle and balance the Power Wave. Another of Terry's most iconic early moves is called the Power Wave (パワーウェイブ), where he generates a massive geyser of energy by punching the ground. Designer Nobuyuki Kuroki said there were several rejected versions of this move, but one of them was used in a later Fatal Fury game, Real Bout Fatal Fury Special. The Burning Knuckle involves a banzai posure where he gathers energy in a similar manner to Dragon Ball characters meant to emphasize Fatal Fury's speed. His most basic and iconic move is the Power Wave which serves as a projectile like a Hadoken. It eventually became his stronger Desperation Move in Fatal Fury 2 under the name of Power Geyser (パワーゲイザー), while in The King of Fighters '95 he obtained the simpler "Power Dunk" to make him more mobile should the Power Geyser failed. In Garou, Terry has a new move called the Buster Wolf (バスターウルフ). Oda said its original name was actually "God Geyser Twin", but he did not find it fitting for the Showa period when the move was added. In 2019, Oda noted that one of Terry's most popular techniques is the Buster Wolf. Before performing the Buster Wolf, Terry says in English "Are you Okay?" as reference to the staff's reaction to Jurassic Park: The Ride. The design required a certain amount of ruggedness, but Oda was careful to keep him from looking too old-fashioned. Regarding his moves, Oda put together his kit with the intention of producing the "ultimate version of Terry". For this game, the intent was to make 35-year-old Terry feel a little more subdued, so he paid attention to those areas. but, he still somersaults when he jumps, and goes into a full sprint when he dashes, so he hasn't really lost a step. He hopes Terry maintains his good health for more games.

When The King of Fighters was announced, Terry was quickly added into the franchise by the SNK staff, who noted "his popularity skyrocketed!" His development was overseen by many designers who "fretted over various aspects of his character". In retrospect the SNK staff noted he "became the powerhouse, getting a super punch cancel move added to his arsenal and becoming the fearsome character he is today". The ability to cancel the second hit of his standing punch move was added by one of the game's designers two hours before submitting the game's mask ROM. There were also arguments about the character's winpose, but in the end they decided on something new. Terry's alter ego "Wild Wolf" from KOF: Maximum Impact 2 was designed to share Terry's Garou: Mark of the Wolves with Rising Tackle and Round Wave having been removed, super special moves such as Power Stream and Rising Beat, which were in The King of Fighters 2003 and SVC Chaos', have been added, and many special moves are now affected by braking. This applies to moves that the player wonder if braking is even possible.

Game designer Masahiro Sakurai said he wanted to show the original appeal of Terry in Super Smash Bros. when including him in the game. Sakurai preferred using his Fatal Fury 2 design in Smash as he believes it is one of the most recognizable ones, most notably in the 1990s. In doing so, Terry was made to automatically look at his opponents in one-on-one fights, including jumps where the character spins. He was designed to be slower than most characters. A new move known as the Somersault Kick was created for Smash although the original moves were also retained. An airbased variation of his original projectile technique, the Power Wave, was also used to balance the character. In order to accommodate his full moveset, Terry is the only character who has different side special moves depending on whether the player inputs left or right, and can use Desperation Moves if his health reaches a critical point rather than as his Final Smash, which is a completely new move melding together his different Desperation Moves.

In Masami Obari's Fatal Fury animated adaptations, Terry is given an original move taught by Tung Fu Rue in his last moments: the "Hado Senpukyaku" (波動旋風脚; lit. "Fluctuating Cyclone Kick") in which Terry covers himself into a tornado to take down his enemies. The move was implemented in both Street Fighter 6 as a tribute to Obari but under the name of Rising Fang (ライジングファング). Obari also took note of the anime move's usage in gaming and posted on his X account that it was an honor and was overwhelmed being involved in fighting games series.

== Appearances ==
=== In video games ===
The original Fatal Fury centers around Terry and his younger brother Andy who enter the King of Fighters tournament to avenge their adoptive father Jeff Bogard's death. He was murdered a decade before by the tournament's sponsor, Geese Howard. Along with their friend Joe Higashi, they manage to defeat Geese who dies falling from a tower after fighting one of the three main characters. The numerous Fatal Fury sequels released later feature Terry and his friends competing in new tournaments. The first sequel, Fatal Fury 2, introduced a new antagonist for Terry to defeat named Wolfgang Krauser who tries to conquer Southtown. By Fatal Fury 3: Road to the Final Victory, Terry continues his fight against Geese, who survived his apparent death and now seeks revenge against Terry and other rivals. Real Bout Fatal Fury concludes the Bogard and Howard rivalry by killing off Geese at the end of the game. Two subsequent Real Bout sequels featuring Terry were produced - Real Bout Fatal Fury Special and Real Bout Fatal Fury 2: The Newcomers (although neither game contains a storyline), along with Fatal Fury: Wild Ambition, a 3D game which retells the plot of the first game. Terry Bogard's character was reinvented for Garou: Mark of the Wolves, which features an older Terry as the mentor of Geese's son, Rock Howard. Terry and Rock enter a new King of Fighters tournament related to the latter's heritage. As revealed in the featurette Memories of Stray Wolves, Rock is the winner of the tournament, joining the host Kain after learning he is related with his mother, leaving Terry who tells this story to Blue Mary. Terry returns in Fatal Fury: City of the Wolves in a new The King of Fighters where he meets Rock again but loses the fight again. The two fight again when Rock loses control of his powers. In the aftermath, Rock reunites with his missing mother. Terry, believing Rock is now strong enough to stand on his own, goes back to South Town, with Rock thanking Terry for raising him and promising to meet again. Terry also helps Andy and Mai's disciple, Hokutomaru to move in to South Town, and assist Kevin Rian and Blue Mary to capture a criminal Freeman.

After the release of Fatal Fury 2, Terry appeared in The King of Fighters '94, where he serves as the leader of the game's "Fatal Fury" team alongside Andy and Joe. The King of Fighters series, which was originally conceived as a crossover of SNK's previous video game franchises, eventually established their own self-contained continuity set apart from the earlier Fatal Fury series. While the Fatal Fury Team's members change various times across the series, Terry remains the team's leader. The Fatal Fury Team remains as in the first KOF in the games without a storyline. They include: The King of Fighters '98, The King of Fighters 2002 and Neowave. In The King of Fighters: Kyo, a role-playing game (RPG) centered on Kyo Kusanagi, Terry appears when Kyo goes to South Town and helps him fight Geese Howard. In the two games for the Game Boy Advance titled EX: Neo Blood and EX2, the Fatal Fury Team participates in the new tournaments. Terry also appears in the KOF: Maximum Impact sub-series in both his Fatal Fury 2 and Mark of the Wolves outfits, with the latter being labelled as "Wild Wolf" (ワイルドウルフ, Wairudourufu). Taking place before Garou, Terry is given a subplot in Maximum Impact 2 as Geese's right hand man Billy Kane seeks revenge against Terry for his death and brands him as hypocrite for calling him his revenge. The character is also present in The King of Fighters All Star in his Fatal Fury 2 and Garou personas and KOF 98: Ultimate Match Online.

He is also playable in the shooter game Sky Stage, and stars in the crossover video games NeoGeo Battle Coliseum in his Mark of the Wolves outfit and the SNK vs. Capcom series in his Fatal Fury 2 outfit. The shooting game Neo Geo Heroes: Ultimate Shooting uses him as a playable character. An alternate female version of Terry is featured in the game SNK Heroines: Tag Team Frenzy. Terry's ending is a dream that revisits the events of Geese's death, but an older Rock also throws him from a cliff before he awakes in the present where Rock had been trying to wake him up after finished cooking their breakfasts. Terry appears as a guest character in the Arika fighting game Fighting EX Layer. He is available in the King of Fighters X Fatal Fury mobile phone game, the Chinese mobile phone game called KOF: WORLD, Metal Slug Defense, the dating sim Days of Memories and the otome game King of Fighters for Girls. A pachinko based on the Orochi storyline of the series was released by SNK featuring Terry, while The Rhythm of Fighters has the character. Terry appears as a playable fighter in Super Smash Bros. Ultimate. He was released as downloadable content in November 2019, along with a stage based on Fatal Fury and The King of Fighters known as King of Fighters Stadium. Terry was added as a playable character in Street Fighter 6 in September 2024 as part of its second season of downloadable content. The game has him travel across the setting of the series while interacting with followers who bring memories of the Fatal Fury series until meeting Street Fighter character Ken Masters.

=== In other media ===
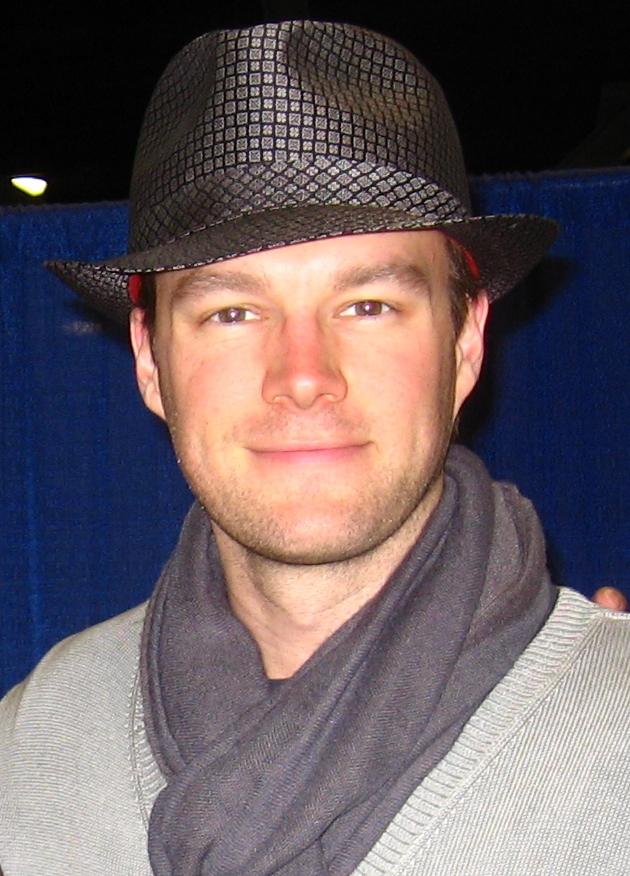
Mark Hildreth voices Terry in the English dub of the animated Fatal Fury works.

Terry Bogard is the central character in a trilogy of Japanese animated Fatal Fury films. Two of them were original video animations (OVA) while the third was a theatrical release where his character is voiced by Shōnentai lead singer Nishikiori Kazukiyo in the Japanese originals and Mark Hildreth in the English dubs. The first two OVAs, 1992's Fatal Fury: Legend of the Hungry Wolf and 1993's Fatal Fury 2: The New Battle loosely follow the storylines of their respective games, while the third theatrical film, 1994's Fatal Fury: The Motion Picture, features an original storyline. The first OVA introduces a new love interest for Terry named Lily McGuire, an orphan raised by Geese Howard. Lily is killed by Geese during the first OVA, but she appears in both sequels as a spirit who guides Terry. The theatrical film introduced a new love interest for Terry named Sulia. She is the younger sister of the antagonist, Laocorn Gaudeamus, who sacrifices herself near the end of the film to help Terry defeat her brother. He is also present into the novelizations of The King of Fighters.

Terry plays a supporting role in the 2006 original internet animation The King of Fighters: Another Day. He appears in the episode Accede voiced in the Japanese version by his video game voice actor, Satoshi Hashimoto. Terry is featured in volume 3 of the soundtracks series SNK Character Sounds Collection released by Pony Canyon. The CD features several songs based on his character. He appears in several manhua, including the Fatal Fury series, The King of Fighters and SNK Vs. Capcom: SVC Chaos, which retell the stories of their respective games. The first seven chapters of the manhua The King of Fighters 2003 by Wing Yen feature a short chapter from Garou: Mark of the Wolves that tells of Rock's training with Terry. His character is part of a social action program created by SNK Playmore named the "Nakoruru & Terry Club". The organization supports children to guide them to a better future. David Leitch portrays Terry in the live-action 2010 film The King of Fighters, where his role is that of a CIA agent who serves as the supporting side-kick and comic-relief of Iori, Kyo, and Mai's team.

Terry is also one of the characters featured in The King of Fighters: Destiny, an animated retelling of the first game in the series, voiced by his new voice actor in the games Takashi Kondo. In this story, Terry enters a tournament with Andy and Joe to avenge Jeff like the first Fatal Fury. He begins a romantic relationship with a woman named Angelina who is an agent from Geese. As Geese is about to kill Terry, Angelina sacrifices herself to protect him and he takes down Geese. After the battle, Heidern takes Terry and Kyo to meet the real mastermind behind Geese's power, Rugal Bernstein. Although Terry is defeated, Kyo manages to overpower Rugal. Terry plays a minor role in the manga The King of Fighters G where he faces Iori Yagami during the tournament and is nearly killed in combat by his enemy. However, when the tournament is interrupted, the Bogard brothers engage in a fight against Geese and Billy Kane.

== Cultural impact ==
=== Promotion ===
Terry is frequently used to represent the company in crossover games, merchandise and publicity. During the KOF Year-End Party in 2005, a fan event held by SNK, the character's cap was given to every fan in attendance. For the Japanese special endings in The King of Fighters '97, three video game publications, Gamest, Famitsu and Neo Geo Freak, had to create a team composed of three characters for a special illustration. Gamest created a team composed of Terry, Blue Mary and Joe Higashi. In late 2018, Terry and other characters created by SNK appeared as part of a collaboration between other companies in Harajuku Japan involving new merchandising.

=== Critical response ===
The character has received both praise and criticism from several media publications. GameSpot reviewer Frank Provo commented that one of Fatal Fury's biggest accomplishments is the creation of Terry Bogard and their use of him in later sequels. Den of Geek compared Terry to a "travelling hobo deal" similar to the ones from Street Fighter but more upbeat with a traditional focus on revenge. IGN regarded him as one of the most iconic fighting game characters of all time based on his design and moves. His design has often been praised, in particular for his red cap which improves his coolness. Den of Geek editor Harry Slater commented that "Bogard is a stark reminder of the glory days of the two dimensional fighter". GamesRadar called Terry "one of SNK's most memorable characters". His role in the story, for example his adoption of Rock Howard, was also praised. 4thletter listed Terry's ending in Real Bout Fatal Fury as the best one in gaming as it not only ends his rivalry with Geese but also shows more of his relationship with Rock Howard. Game Type magazine praised Rock and Terry's relationship as they really seem like son and father and wondered whether or not Terry's love interest Blue Mary would end up joining them. However, they lamented the game ending on a cliffhanger with Rock joining Kain and leaving Terry's side despite their bond. Prima Games listed his "Burn Knuckle" as one of the 50 greatest fighting moves in video game history because Terry dashes towards his enemies in the process. Capcom had complaints about Ryo Sakazaki's and Terry Bogard's projectile technique Ko-Ou Ken and Power Wave, respectively, were executed with the same input as Ryu and Ken Masters's Hadoken as both the companies had issues with SNK developing similar video games and characters following the change of staff members after the first Street Fighter. Terry was given a move known as the "Buster Wolf" which was listed as one of the best techniques in fighting games by Arcade Sushi not only because of its impact, but also before landing the attack, the character ironically says "Are you okay?"

The female portrayal of Terry in SNK Heroines: Tag Team Frenzy was met with surprise. Push Square joked about the implications of the developers changing Terry's gender while Nintendo Life wondered why they did not use Alice Nakata, a female fighter who has some of Terry's moves. Nevertheless, the site found Terry's fighting style in the crossover to be promising. Despite also finding the fighter's appearance confusing, Game Informer commented that every SNK game might need Terry regardless of gender. Destructoid noted that while Terry retained his original moves, most fans were unaware that the female Terry appeared for the first time in a Japanese mobile game. Daily World News agreed with Nintendo Life's questioning why SNK did not use Alice instead. They noted the most common response had been mixed and wondered if this was meant to be a joke similar to Iori Yagami's cross-dressing alter-ego, Miss X, from SNK Gals' Fighters. A commercial for the mobile phone game SNK Allstar generated disgust in social media for Terry being portrayed as a man sexually harassing women. This led to the game's cancellation when SNK's heard about it.

The character's inclusion in Street Fighter 6 was praised by Anime News Network for its level of attention to the detail despite noting negative backlash about his large chin, but still found it as a fanservice to SNK fans, most specifically gamers from Garou: Mark of the Wolves. Den of Geek positively compared him with Street Fighter characters Ryu and Ken Masters based on their personalities. Kotaku enjoyed Capcom's decision especially due to how Terry is the rival of Ken Masters from Street Fighter as highlighted in promotional artwork of previous crossovers, while praising how well made was Capcom's take of Terry's Garou: Mark of the Wolves outfit, thanking there is an additional way to unlock it besides paying for content. The similarities between Terry and Ken were noted to make them iconic rivals especially with their meeting in Street Fighter 6 as both characters suffer personal crisis as well as in City of the Wolves where Ken was selected as guest instead. Tyler Treese of GameRevolution has praised Terry's addition in Super Smash Bros. Ultimate by stating that "There are so many ridiculous possibilities for him to battle."

Anime News Network's Bamboo Dong praised Terry's character development in the Fatal Fury original video animations because they portrayed his insecurities, something rarely seen in other adaptations. Chris Beveridge of Mania Beyond Entertainment also praised the characters' development citing Terry's grief over the loss of his love interest. In contrast THEM Anime Reviews' Raphael criticized Terry's story for being told several times already in other series and also panned his final fight against Geese Howard because of the lack of regular martial arts and the use of chi-like energy instead. For The Motion Picture, Anime News Network found Terry's tragic characterization and fate sad enough to make him sensitive as it contrasted his views on fighting game characters in general with Terry losing for the second time a woman he loves despite having the power to defeat the villain. Although the live-action film of The King of Fighters has been panned, Beyond Hollywood said that KOF's "only saving grace ... is David Leitch, who is flat-out hilarious as world-weary CIA agent Terry Bogard. Yeah, the character doesn't make a lick of sense, but in this film, it borders on genius". Felix Vasquez of Cinema Crazed, however, criticized Terry's character in the movie calling him a "nuisance".
