= Fatal Fury: City of the Wolves =

- Developer: KOF Studio
- Publisher: SNK
- Director: Hayato Konya
- Designers: Kaito Soranaka; Kunihiro Ono; Shinya Tamaki
- Programmer: Kenichi Roppongi
- Artist: Tetsuya Yamamoto
- Writer: Kim-Ken
- Composers: Hideki "Sha-V" Asanaka; Naoki Kita; Minori Sasaki; Yu Shimoda; Mayuko Hino; Fuga Yamahata; Akira Sakamoto; Rei Wako
- Series: Fatal Fury
- Engine: Unreal Engine 4
- Platforms: Nintendo Switch 2; PlayStation 4; PlayStation 5; Windows; Xbox Series X/S
- Release: PlayStation 4, PlayStation 5, Windows, Xbox Series X: WW: April 24, 2025; Nintendo Switch 2: WW: October 22, 2026
- Genre: Fighting
- Modes: Single-player; multiplayer

Fatal Fury: City of the Wolves (Note: Japanese: 餓狼伝説 City of the Wolves, Hepburn: Garō Densetsu Shiti obu za Uruvusu; lit. "Legend of the Hungry Wolf City of the Wolves") is a 2025 fighting game developed by KOF Studio and published by SNK. It is the seventh main installment in the Fatal Fury series and the first new entry in over 25 years, following Garou: Mark of the Wolves (1999). The game was released for PlayStation 4, PlayStation 5, Windows, and Xbox Series X/S on April 24, 2025; a Nintendo Switch 2 version followed on October 22, 2026.

A sequel was in production immediately after the release of Garou: Mark of the Wolves, but was abandoned before completion due to a lack of demand. In 2022, SNK announced a new Fatal Fury game. SNK ran an extensive marketing campaign prior to release; the announcement of Cristiano Ronaldo and Salvatore Ganacci as playable characters was met with particular backlash from fans and critics. Upon release, it received generally positive reviews from critics.

== Gameplay ==
A match taking place between Rock Howard and Preecha, who is utilizing the “Hyper Defense” system to stop Howard’s multi-hit attack.

Gameplay in Fatal Fury: City of the Wolves is similar to that of its predecessor, Garou: Mark of the Wolves, with combat taking place on a two-dimensional movement plane, though one stage does allow the use of the two-lane system from earlier Fatal Fury games. Several mechanics from Mark of the Wolves are retained in City of the Wolves, including the T.O.P. system, renamed the "Selective Potential Gear" (S.P.G.) system; and the "Just Defense" mechanic, which features an expanded "Hyper Defense" variation designed to protect against attacks that hit multiple times. In addition to basic normal moves and special moves, players can also gain access to "Gear" super attacks by filling two meters at the bottom of their screen. Spending one meter will perform an Ignition Gear attack, while both meters can be spent to perform a more powerful Redline Gear attack. The most powerful super move, the Hidden Gear, requires both bars to be spent while the S.P.G. is active.

A new mechanic introduced in the game is the "Rev System". Players can perform multiple types of Rev abilities, including "Rev Arts", enhanced versions of a character's special moves; "Rev Blow", an attack that can help put distance between the two characters; "Rev Accel", which assists in chaining attacks together to create combos; and "Rev Guard", a defensive block which pushes opponents away as their attack connects. Using these techniques gradually causes the character's Rev Gauge to fill; when full, the character will enter an Overheat state and be unable to use any Rev abilities until it fully depletes. The affected player can drain their gauge more quickly by actively approaching and attacking their opponent. The game offers two control schemes for players to choose from: "Arcade Style", which features traditional controls akin to previous entries in the series, and "Smart Style", a simplified control scheme that allows players to perform attacks and combos using only basic directional inputs and single button presses, though certain abilities are inaccessible in Smart Style.

In addition to the standard arcade mode, the game features a single player mode called "Episodes of South Town". This mode features RPG mechanics and has players selecting challenge missions scattered around a South Town map to earn experience points and additional skills for their chosen character. Progressing in this mode will unlock new outfits, colors, and patterns with which to customize the characters in the "Color Edit" mode. Music from other Fatal Fury and Art of Fighting games can also be played during battles or using an in-game jukebox. The game supports online multiplayer, including rollback netcode and cross-platform play. An additional story mode, "Wolves' Destiny", was added to the game for its first anniversary.

=== Characters ===
Fatal Fury: City of the Wolves features 17 characters in its base roster, with an additional 18 as downloadable content. While the previous game, Mark of the Wolves, featured an almost entirely new roster of playable fighters, City of the Wolves marks the return of several characters from the earlier Fatal Fury games, along with characters originating from Fatal Fury's sister series, Art of Fighting. In addition, the game introduces Laocorn Gaudeamus from the 1994 anime film Fatal Fury: The Motion Picture as a playable character for the first time.

City of the Wolves is the first Fatal Fury game to feature guest characters not created by SNK. Real life professional footballer Cristiano Ronaldo and DJ Salvatore Ganacci appear as playable characters in the game's base roster. Each downloadable content season has added characters from other IPs, including Capcom's Street Fighter franchise in the first season, the Fist of the North Star manga series in the second, and the Tokyo Revengers manga series and Bandai Namco's Tekken franchise in the third.

Newcomers are marked in bold, while guest characters are marked in italics.

Base game roster

- B. Jenet
- Billy Kane
- **Cristiano Ronaldo**
- Gato
- Hokutomaru
- Hotaru Futaba
- Kain R. Heinlein
- Kevin Rian
- Kim Dong Hwan
- Mai Shiranui
- Marco Rodrigues
- **Preecha**
- Rock Howard (Note: Also appears as non-playable boss, "Fallen Rock")
- **Salvatore Ganacci**
- Terry Bogard (Note: Also appears as non-playable boss, "Kage Wolf")
- Tizoc
- **Vox Reaper**

DLC characters

- Andy Bogard
- Blue Mary
- **Chun-Li**
- Duck King
- Joe Higashi
- **Ken Masters**
- **Ken Ryūgūji**
- **Kenshiro**
- Kim Jae Hoon
- Kim Kaphwan
- **Laocorn**
- **Manjirō Sano**
- **Mr. Big**
- **Mr. Karate**
- **Reina**
- Rick Strowd
- Nightmare Geese (Note: Also appears as a boss in the base game)
- Wolfgang Krauser

== Plot ==
A year after the King of Fighters: Maximum Mayhem tournament, (Note: As depicted in Garou: Mark of the Wolves (1999)) Rock Howard and Kain R. Heinlein's investigations have determined the whereabouts of Marie Heinlein, Rock's mother and Kain's sister who was believed deceased. They learn that Mr. Big is holding her captive, demanding the legacy of Rock's deceased father Geese Howard as ransom. Rock goes to Geese's former right hand, Billy Kane, who reveals that among the items in Geese's legacy are the Sacred Scrolls of Jin, magic relics which he had preserved despite Geese ordering they be destroyed before his death. (Note: As depicted in Real Bout Fatal Fury (1995)) Billy agrees to give Rock the legacy, but it is stolen by an unknown figure.

Days later, an invitation is sent out by Franz Krauser von Stroheim, son of Wolfgang Krauser, for a new King of Fighters tournament in Second South Town, with the stolen legacy offered as the prize. During the tournament, Kain and Billy negotiate with Big for Marie's safe return and protect her from their enemies, such as Big's former underling Jack Turner, while Rock reunites with his adoptive father Terry Bogard and goes on to win the tournament. As the others return to Geese Tower with Marie, Jack appears and attacks Big, injuring Marie. Seeing this, Rock's intense emotions resonate with the scrolls, causing him to become possessed and forcing Terry and the others to fight him.

During the battle, Rock and Billy experience visions revealing that Geese left Marie and Rock to hide them from his enemies, and that a curse on the Sacred Scrolls of Jin allows those descended from the Jin family to be possessed by their ancestors; because Geese is descended from the Jins through his father Rudolph Krauser von Stroheim, he ordered the scrolls destroyed to protect Rock. Rock is defeated and returns to normal, and happily reunites with his mother while the others burn the scrolls. In the aftermath, Marie goes to live together with Kain, and Billy agrees to keep the rest of Geese's legacy safe. Terry, believing Rock is now strong enough to stand on his own, goes back to South Town, with Rock thanking Terry for raising him and promising to meet again.

=== Wolves' Destiny ===
Six months after the King of Fighters tournament, Wolfgang Krauser emerges from hiding, plotting to take over South Town before moving on to the rest of the world. He recruits Gao and Mr. Big to his cause, and begins manipulating Second South Town behind the scenes to draw out Kain. Kain, Vox, and Rock confront Krauser, who reveals that the Sacred Scrolls survived their burning and that he seeks their power. Krauser overpowers all three, who are forced to retreat. Kain explains that he knew Rock had been chosen as the scrolls' new vessel, and had hoped to use Rock's new power to aid in his goals. Rock, who has begun succumbing to the scrolls' influence, begins to doubt Kain's plans and chooses to go his own way. Kain defeats Krauser and begins exerting stronger control over South Town, turning it into a kratocracy. Rock is approached by Krauser's son Franz.

The Second South city hall is bombed, with surveillance footage identifying Hotaru and Gato as the culprits. Kevin asks Blue Mary to investigate, believing the footage may be fake. Mary eventually catches up with the siblings and offers to smuggle them out of town, but they refuse to leave until they track down their father, Gao. Kevin is ordered by his superiors to arrest them, but allows them to escape. Mary finds evidence of the footage being doctored, allowing the siblings to clear their names. Vox reveals that Kain orchestrated the incident to try and lure out Gao.

== Development and marketing ==
In 2005, during the KOF Year-End Party fan event, SNK Playmore illustrator Falcoon mentioned that a sequel to Garou: Mark of the Wolves was around 70% complete for the Neo Geo by the SNK team. Falcoon also confirmed that one of the new characters meant to appear was a student of legacy Fatal Fury character Joe Higashi. In July 2006, SNK Playmore reported that they were still working on the sequel, saying that they would use modern high-resolution graphics instead of the resolution quality level seen in the original game. During an interview in March 2008, SNK Playmore USA developers commented that there was not any concrete schedule of demands for the game and that they planned to make the sequel with some new technology.

In June 2016, SNK revealed artwork and sprites of the cast of the cancelled Neo Geo version. Nobuyuki Kuroki stated in February 2020 that he was personally interested in 'reviving' the Fatal Fury series.

During EVO 2022, it was revealed that a new Fatal Fury game was officially in development at SNK. At EVO 2023, SNK announced the game's title to be Fatal Fury: City of the Wolves, and revealed a first look at the gameplay, demonstrating it would be a 2.5D fighting game similar to their other contemporary fighting games Samurai Shodown (2019) and The King of Fighters XV (2022). In March 2024, the game was officially announced for a 2025 release. Additionally, it was announced that City of the Wolves will be the first Fatal Fury game to feature an English-language voice track, and the first SNK game to do so since The King of Fighters XII (2009).

Following a teaser in September 2024, professional athlete Cristiano Ronaldo was announced as a playable character in March 2025. Ronaldo's announcement was followed by confirmation of musician Salvatore Ganacci as a playable character in April 2025, who also worked with SNK to incorporate music from several different DJs into the game's soundtrack. Both announcements were met with backlash from fans and critics, with multiple outlets claiming the two felt out of place in the game, particularly given a history of controversies surrounding Ronaldo. Several believed their inclusion to be the result of influence from the Saudi Arabian government, as SNK is owned by the Misk Foundation operated by Crown Prince of Saudi Arabia Mohammed bin Salman.

The game was promoted as part of a boxing match between Chris Eubank Jr. and Conor Benn in April 2025; a trailer featuring the two boxers battling the game's cast was released to advertise the match, also featuring iShowSpeed and KSI. In addition, the game was also promoted at WWE's WrestleMania 41 event in Las Vegas on April 19, 2025, as Ganacci appeared on the stage performing an entrance for Jey Uso's match against Gunther for Raw's World Heavyweight Championship. The game features an animated opening cinematic directed by Masami Obari, who previously directed Fatal Fury: The Motion Picture (1994), with music by Ganacci.

When releasing characters, SNK aimed to have the same number of characters as the PS5 and PC versions and runs at 60 frames per second. Mai originally wore heels in this game. Fans told SNK they wanted to use or see Mai in her old, classic red outfit. They gave her a new design for the game’s launch, but demand for her ninja outfit was strong. The staff felt that people had become familiar with Mai's new look, so they decided to release her classic outfit as an additional costume. The inclusion of Tokyo Revengers DLC was meant to appeal to a younger audience and sport tournaments. They also wanted to collaborate with Tekken, as Geese Howard had previously appeared in Tekken 7, so they selected a character by thinking about that kind of synergy and who people would enjoy. However, the director was against collaborating with Samurai Showdown due to their usage of weapons or The King of Fighters to base their own image of Fatal Fury regardless of their previous inclusion of Mr. Karate from Art of Fighting. As Obari had been promoting the game through multiple animations, SNK came up with the idea of using Laocorn from Obari's previous work Fatal Fury: The Motion Picture especially since Fatal Fury does not have too many boss characters. In order to appeal to newcomers, City of the Wolves game has a control option called Smart Style, which lets them defeat opponents by simply repeatedly pressing buttons. From there, the player can explore the systems further. Konya aims to release more Fatal Fury characters like Tsugumi Sendo and Li Xiangfei despite demand for The King of Fighters characters. The main game continued to develop alongside the Switch 2 version. There were major changes to the UI during that time, and SNK repeatedly found that progress we had made needed to be revisited. Konya aims to release as many DLC characters as possible without a established goal, leading to fix multiple balancing issues; In particular Geese and Krauser caused SNK multiple problems.

== Release ==
Fatal Fury: City of the Wolves was released for PlayStation 4, PlayStation 5, Windows, and Xbox Series X/S on April 24, 2025. It is only available in a "Special Edition" format, which includes the base game and the first season pass. Players who pre-ordered the game received an additional costume for Terry based on his appearance in Fatal Fury 2 (1992), along with three days of early access. At the 2024 Tokyo Game Show, it was announced that Ken and Chun-Li from Capcom's Street Fighter series would be added to City of the Wolves as part of the first season of downloadable content, following Terry and Mai's similar appearance as DLC in Street Fighter 6 that year. The remaining three characters for the season were announced during the 2025 Evo Awards. The second DLC season began in January 2026, with a new character releasing each month, though the announcement trailer was heavily criticized for its use of generative AI. Following the June 2026 release of the second season's final character, Kenshiro from Fist of the North Star, a third season was confirmed at Evo 2026, with monthly character releases resuming the following month.

A Nintendo Switch 2 port was announced during a September 2026 Nintendo Direct broadcast; it was released on October 22, 2026.

== Reception ==
Reception

Aggregate scores
Aggregator	Score
Metacritic	80/100 (PS5); 79/100 (XSX); 80/100 (PC)
OpenCritic	84% recommend (Note: Based on 103 reviews)

Review scores
Publication	Score
Digital Trends	3.5/5
Eurogamer	4/5
Famitsu	33/40
HobbyConsolas	85%
IGN	8/10
Jeuxvideo.com	16/20
MeriStation	8/10
PCMag	4/5
Push Square	7/10
Shacknews	8/10
TechRadar	8/10

Fatal Fury: City of the Wolves received "generally favorable" reviews from critics, according to review aggregator website Metacritic. OpenCritic determined that 84% of critics recommended the game. In Japan, four critics from Famitsu gave the game a total score of 33 out of 40.

During its first week of sales in Japan, Fatal Fury: City of the Wolves sold 5,067 physical units on PlayStation 5 and 2,599 on PlayStation 4. An additional 1,235 units were sold during the second week, resulting in initial physical sales of 8,901 units.

=== Accolades ===
The game won "Best Fighting Game" at The Game Awards 2025, and was nominated for "Fighting Game of the Year" at the 29th Annual D.I.C.E. Awards.
