= The King of Fighters XIV =

2016 video game

- Publishers: JP: SNK; NA: Atlus USA; EU: Deep Silver
- Directors: Yasuyuki Oda, Nobuyuki Kuroki (art director)
- Artist: Eisuke Ogura
- Series: The King of Fighters
- Platforms: PlayStation 4; Windows; Arcade
- Release: PlayStation 4: NA: August 23, 2016; JP: August 25, 2016; PAL: August 26, 2016; Windows: WW: June 15, 2017; Arcade: JP: June 29, 2017
- Genre: Fighting
- Modes: Single-player, multiplayer
- Arcade system: Taito Type X3 (NESiCAxLive2)

The King of Fighters XIV (Note: Japanese: ザ・キング・オブ・ファイターズ XIV, Hepburn: Za Kingu Obu Faitāzu Fōtīn) is a 2016 fighting game developed by KOF Studio and published by SNK. It is the fourteenth main installment in The King of Fighters series. It is the first game in the series to be rendered entirely in 3D, although gameplay is restricted to a 2D plane. The game was released worldwide for the PlayStation 4 in August 2016 and ported to Windows and Japanese arcade cabinets in June 2017.

The development of The King of Fighters XIV began in April 2014, after SNK's CEO Eikichi Kawasaki who reoriented the company toward traditional video games after several years of focus on Pachinko-style slot machines and mobile apps. Yasuyuki Oda, who previously worked on Capcom's Street Fighter IV and other titles by SNK, directed the game. It retains the series' system of teams composed of three fighters while introducing "Rush Combo", an automatic combo system designed to make the series more accessible for new players. The game received post-release downloadable content support through new characters, alternative outfits and patches to improve the game's visuals. Kyōtarō Azuma wrote a spin-off manga series, The King of Fighters: A New Beginning, published from 2018 to 2020.

The King of Fighters XIV received generally favorable reviews. Critics praised the game's fighting system as enjoyable for both new players and fighting game experts, but criticized its graphics as inferior to other fighting games released for the eighth generation of video game consoles. The game was a commercial success by according to Oda as SNK was remade thanks to its achievements, reaching 920,000 copies sold by combining the PS4 port and the Steam port. A sequel, The King of Fighters XV, was released in 2022.

== Gameplay ==
A fight between Terry Bogard (left) and Geese Howard (right)

The King of Fighters XIV features full 3D models like its spin-off The King of Fighters: Maximum Impact against a 2D background. The player can select a three-character team. In the game's story, the characters often interact depending on their relationships. After eight rounds, the player fights two bosses.

The game introduced a system known as the Max Mode. While in Max Mode, the player can perform an unlimited amount of named EX, special moves superior than the regular moves for a short time, with the timer changing in response to the character's position. The characters use three types of Supers: Super Special Moves, Max Super Special Moves, and a new type called Climax Super Special Moves. Max Super Special Moves require two power bars (located in the screen's bottom), in to execute—one if Max Mode is activated. Climax Super Special Moves are the strongest in the game, requiring three power gauges, or two while Max Mode is active. The game also features the Just Defend mechanic which allows the players to parry enemies' moves.

For beginners, there is an automatic feature called Rush Combo. When performing a Rush, the player can create combos of special attacks as well as Desperation Moves if the energy bar is filled. Techniques created by the Rush system produce less damage than ones performed manually. The online lobby has modes called team VS, single VS, and party VS; up to 12 players can enter and spectate.

== Plot ==
The King of Fighters XIV takes place four years after the 2010 events of The King of Fighters XIII. A Russian billionaire named Antonov buys the rights to the King of Fighters competitions to host a new tournament in which veterans and newcomers compete. Following the competition, the chosen faces Antonov. In the aftermath, the winning team must confront a strange, threatening entity named Verse. This anomaly attracts characters from other dimensions, timelines and universes. Following Verse's defeat, some characters take missions to confront people revived through this mysterious enemy.

== Characters ==
The King of Fighters XIV includes 16 teams of three fighters, a sub-boss, a final boss, and eight downloadable fighters, totaling 58 fighters:

Team Japan

- Kyo Kusanagi
- Benimaru Nikaido
- Goro Daimon

Official Invitation Team

- Sylvie Paula Paula
- Kukri
- Mian

Team South America

- Nelson
- Zarina
- Bandeiras Hattori

Team Yagami

- Iori Yagami
- Mature
- Vice

Team Kim

- Kim Kaphwan
- Gang-Il
- Luong

Team Mexico

- Ramón
- Ángel
- King of Dinosaurs

Another World Team

- Nakoruru
- Mui Mui
- Love Heart

Villains Team

- Xanadu
- Chang Koehan
- Choi Bounge

Team China

- Shun'ei
- Tung Fu Rue
- Meitenkun

K' Team

- K'
- Kula Diamond
- Maxima

Ikari Warriors

- Ralf Jones
- Clark Still
- Leona Heidern

Team South Town

- Geese Howard
- Billy Kane
- Hein

Fatal Fury Team

- Terry Bogard
- Andy Bogard
- Joe Higashi

Women Fighters

- King
- Mai Shiranui
- Alice

Psycho Soldiers

- Athena Asamiya
- Sie Kensou
- Chin Gentsai

Art of Fighting Team

- Ryo Sakazaki
- Robert Garcia
- Yuri Sakazaki

Single Entry/Sub Boss

- Antonov

Boss

- Verse

DLC

Season 1

- Whip
- Ryuji Yamazaki
- Vanessa
- Rock Howard

Season 2

- Heidern
- Oswald
- Najd
- Blue Mary

== Development ==
The King of Fighters XIV was made when SNK's then-CEO Eikichi Kawasaki decided the company should return to producing appealing fighting games rather than Pachinko-style slot machines and mobile apps. The game began full production in April 2014 using staff from Esaka. The development team wanted the game to be easy to play and as popular as The King of Fighters '98 and KOF 2002. While The King of Fighters XIII was a success, the staff said it was challenging to new players. Accordingly, they intended to combine the simplicity of KOF '98 with the Quick Max features of KOF 2002 and the method used to manage meters in KOF XIII.

The King of Fighters XIV was first announced at the Sony Computer Entertainment press conference for the 2015 Tokyo Game Show and was present at the PlayStation Experience 2015. SNK chose to develop the game for the PlayStation 4 because of the console's high worldwide sales. The company did not want to add a new system to the game, but made some changes in response to The King of Fighters XIII; they had yet to decide whether they would update the game or leave it as a single release followed by sequels. In August 2016, their staff decided to advance the new plot through a sequel.

=== Engine ===
In October 2015, it was confirmed Yasuyuki Oda, the battle designer of Street Fighter IV, would direct The King of Fighters XIV. This was his first contribution to the franchise, leading a younger staff. Oda claimed the KOF franchise was unique for its fast-paced combat and how players have to react to the game's mechanics. During Oda's first employment at SNK, games like Virtua Fighter motivated him to make a 3D game after his departure. When he returned, he transitioned the King of Fighters series from 2D to 3D, though the adaption of some characters was more difficult than others. 3D models for characters like Leona Heidern were more difficult than those for Chang Koehan.

SNK developed the game engine internally. They considered using Unreal Engine 4, but decided against using the version at the time since it did not fit with SNK's budget and goals. Rather than using cel-shaded graphic, the staff adhered to Oda and Kuroki's vision for the King of Fighters series to follow the '94's style. According to the developer Neo_G, Neo Geo games of that vintage have a look that tried to imitate reality using pixels. According to Oda, the series always had tall, realistic characters until XIII, which uses a style similar to anime. The original game has realistic visuals which clash with character models like Kula Diamond and Athena Asamiya, so they chose the current look. The team, however, received negative feedback about the game's visuals due to being too different from the original ones. As a result, the company worked in order to make the cast look like usual.

The development team found running the game at 60 frames per second (fps) in full HD challenging. The demand for 60 fps over more detailed graphics was made to ensure the game would perform well online. To save production time and budget, Oda allowed three characters to have obscured faces so they would not require facial animations. Sound director Hideki Asanaka had problems incorporating all the sound effects for the 3D game. The team used camerawork in every Max Super Desperation Move and Climax Super Special Move to make them look stylish. Hayato Watanabe created the battle design; Eisuke Ogura was the main artist.

=== Cast ===
The King of Fighters (KOF) is known for its large character roster. On December 5, 2015, at PlayStation Experience, SNK confirmed a 50-character roster for the game. Oda said while researching for the game's new characters, they avoided stereotypes like Japanese sumo wrestlers to produce more diversity in the cast which includes characters of various nationalities. Oda coined the term "Kyo-ify" based on the series' main character Kyo Kusanagi in regards to the stylishness presented in the cast. As a result, Oda wanted the fighters to look as appealing as Kyo. Art director Nobuyuki Kuroki found it unfair that only a few designers were included on the staff. Oda created Antonov by mixing traits SNK founding owner, Chairman Kawasaki, and Mr. T, an executive at the time, and divides it by the cosmological constant.

Keisuke Ogura created newcomers Shun'ei and Sylvie, distancing them from previous veterans. He was also in charge of Athena's look as the character always wears different clothing. Kuroki regarded Shun'ei as important to the narrative, desiring his personality to contrast previous leads. Main characters Kyo Kusanagi and Iori Yagami underwent a major redesign to fit the series' new story arc while at the same time the development team tried to keep their appeal intact. Kuroki said he made this move despite fearing a negative response based on the rivals' popularity.

SNK was satisfied with the way the Chinese market received the game even though it was slightly censored in the country. One roster is composed entirely of returning characters, while another has mostly new characters, so the staff selected from all of them, wanting to give the roster some regional colors, grouping teams by countries and concepts, such as a female fighters team. They also confirmed the game was 70% completed by December 2015.

Ogura denied speculation that King of Dinosaurs was a redesign of Tizoc from Garou: Mark of the Wolves, and said they just had similar fighting styles. However, upon the game's release, fans found out that King of Dinosaurs and Tizoc were the same character. In the Neo Geo era of the series, developers could not add Nakoruru from Samurai Shodown because of the KOF engine's limitations. When the character was revealed in KOF XIV, her popularity surprised the developers who indicated that in spite of the Orochi clan members' deaths in the series' first story arc, they might consider adding them depending on the storyline.

Before being added as DLC characters, SNK also considered Blue Mary and Ryuji Yamazaki from the Fatal Fury series for the base roster, but they wanted the game to feel more like The King of Fighters. They noted the game lacked characters from Art of Fighting and attempted to add Jack Turner and John Crawley. However, Oda declined to do this because of their lack of popularity. The developers considered Rock Howard from Garou: Mark of the Wolves for inclusion but found it complicated due to chronology issues: Rock had appeared in previous KOF as a child rather than a teenager so it was not possible to incorporate him to the cast.

== Release ==
To promote The King of Fighters XIV in Japan, SNK released an arcade game build containing 36 playable characters. On July 13, 2016, SNK announced "The King of Fighters XIV World Premiere Tour". The development team would visit other countries to let fans play the release build with 48 characters from the game. The demo was available from July 15 to August 21, 2016. They were used to balance the cast based on feedback. SNK released The King of Fighters XIV in Japan and through Atlus USA in North America; Deep Silver published it in Europe. Demos of the game were shown in Japan, Korea, the United States and other countries.

A comparison of the graphics before and after update (Sylvie Paula Paula is shown)

In the Americas, some copies of the game were shipped earlier than the official release date and SNK asked players not to spoil the game. Kyo Kusanagi's classic high-school outfit appeared as a pre-order bonus and downloadable content, while Iori Yagami's classic outfit appeared as a pre-order bonus for the Chinese version and was later released as DLC worldwide. A new design of "Nightmare Geese" also appeared as DLC. In Japan, SNK sold the game with an artbook. Atlus USA announced its limited edition of the game would include a three-CD soundtrack and an artbook.

Shortly after its debut, SNK released a patch to fix problems with the game's online mode. That November, SNK announced another patch that boosted the game's visuals. This free patch became available on January 11, 2017, along with alternative colors for the characters. Athena Asamiya's The King of Fighters '98 outfit was also available as DLC later that month; Kula Diamond was given a sundress outfit in April.

A patch with enhanced graphics was demonstrated in late December 2016. It was announced the DLC characters Whip, Ryuji Yamazaki, Vanessa and Rock Howard, along with two free DLC update patch stages—Terry Bogard's Fatal Fury 2 stage and the Monaco stage from The King of Fighters '97—would be released on April 5, 2017. Fans leaked Rock's inclusion as DLC; this angered Oda, who wanted to surprise the fans with the official trailer. Other DLC characters included the returning Heidern and Oswald.

Besides regular DLC characters, in November 2017, SNK added a character based on a sketch by Saudi Arabian artist Mashael Al-Barrak, who won a contest organized by Manga Productions in Saudi Arabia, Bahrain, Oman, Iraq, and the United Arab Emirates. SNK used the winning design in the game. The character, Najd, became available with a new stage designed by Zainab Al-Lawaty from Oman. Pleased with the result, SNK chairman, Zhihui Ge, said he wanted to incorporate more content from Middle-Eastern fans and developers to increase the series' appeal in the region.

In May 2017, SNK confirmed The King of Fighters XIV would be ported to Windows, offering as few requirements as possible for the PC platform to run the game. SNK released the Windows port was on June 15 of the same year in two versions—one identical to the original PlayStation 4 game and the other including all the DLC provided by the company. A Japanese arcade port was released shortly afterwards; this was tested at Taito Station arcades. On January 6, 2021, SNK announced a new version of the game, Ultimate Edition, which includes the entire original installment alongside all the downloadable content.

== Reception ==
=== Critical response ===
Reception

Aggregate score
Aggregator	Score
Metacritic	79/100 (PS4)

Review scores
Publication	Score
Destructoid	8/10
Electronic Gaming Monthly	8.5/10
Famitsu	31/40
Game Informer	7.25/10
GameRevolution	8/10
GameSpot	8/10
GamesRadar+	4.5/5
IGN	8/10
Gaming Age	A+
Metro GameCentral	8/10
IGN (Spanish)	8.2/10
Hobby Consolas	89/100

The King of Fighters XIV received generally positive reviews in video game media; on Metacritic it holds an average score of 79 out of 100. Gaming Age's Chris Dunlap gave it a perfect score, saying it is the best of The King of Fighters games. He recommended it to fans of the fighting game genre because of its appealing features such as the Rush System which makes fights easier for newcomers and the possibilities for rematches against the artificial intelligence. Many reviewers commented on the fighting system; GameSpot praised its appeal to newcomers, while EGM praised the game's core mechanics and the use of the Rush System to appeal to a wider audience. Despite the difficulties of mastering characters' moves without the Rush system, Game Informer felt the game's online mode was well executed despite some slowdowns during the game's launch. While also enjoying the multiple mechanics, Hobby Consolas considered the online gaming modes among the most fun in the genre. Metro liked it for appealing to skilled fighting game fans while still being a good starting point for players unhappy with Street Fighter V. GameRevolution said the gameplay remains true to earlier KOF games, most notably The King of Fighters XIII, and was pleased that it retained the challenge needed to execute special moves. IGN praised the large number of modes, characters and unlockable material, GamesRadar and Destructoid appreciated the multiple game mechanics which made the game unique within the franchise.

Reviewers also commented on the narrative and its cast. GamesRadar thought the story mode too simple. Destructoid felt it not reach the appeal of its predecessor due to its lack of narrative. Despite issues with the graphics, Gaming Age found the characters interesting, noting each has a unique fighting style and theme songs that are played when facing rivals. Like Gaming Age, PCMRace found the arcade mode fitting for the series due to how rivals interact before their matches and enjoyed the art behind endings unlocked through a main team. IGN saw the story as appealing but not noteworthy until the clash between rivals which the reviewer felt were few.

The game's 3D characters received negative comments for their poor designs compared to other games of the same generation. Hobby Consolas judged the designs in general to be up to the series' high standards, but described Andy Bogard's model as overly stylized and lacking in grace. Destructoid lamented that the 3D models did not do justice to the excellent character designs, which suffered from bland coloring and lack of detail. Juan Garcia of IGN's Spanish site praised the redesigns of Robert Garcia and Kyo Kusanagi, which he found visually striking in contrast with the other characters, something which Destructoid agreed favoring the redesign of veteran character Maxima and newcomer Kukri. IGN said the game looks poor despite running at 60 fps, but enjoyed the large number of characters and the detailed backgrounds. EGMNOW shared similar comments about the graphics and the surprisingly large number of characters, stating that despite problems with the visuals, there is a large amount of content to entertain players. GameRevolution enjoyed the interactions between the characters when engaging in a rival fight, citing Kyo and Iori Yagami's interactions, but was disappointed there was not as much of it as in previous titles, like Joe Higashi competing with King.

The Steam version of The King of Fighters XIV received mixed reviews. Despite giving it a positive review, PCMrace said the port could have benefited from a cross-platform play with PlayStation 4 players and that the cast still needed to be more balanced in terms of move sets. ONE37pm listed XIV it as the 18th best SNK game due to the new crossovers the series featured besides retaining classic characters thanks to its massive roster.

=== Legacy ===
The King of Fighters XIV reached number 20 on the UK physical sales chart. The game's Japanese release sold 25,819 units in its first ten days. By August it sold 28,083 and by September 11,707. By November 2017, SNK announced the period from mid-2016 to mid-2017 was very profitable, attributing it to the release of The King of Fighters XIV and its DLC characters. The King of Fighters XIV was nominated for the Best Fighting Game Award at The Game Awards of 2016 but lost to Street Fighter V. According to FightersGeneration, it sold over 100,000 copies. By 2018, full estimated sales of the game involve a total of 760,000 copies sold for the PlayStation 4. The Steam port sold 200,000.

Despite initial issues with the online mode and other game features, Yasuyuki Oda said fan response to The King of Fighters XIV was positive, especially after fixing some technical issues. As a result, he thinks The King of Fighters XV is possible, but the company also wants to focus on other franchises. Oda instead worked in a spin-off, SNK Heroines: Tag Team Frenzy, a female character-driven fighting game. Oda spoke about the possibility of porting KOF XIV to the Nintendo Switch, but said there are unspecified technical hurdles. In December 2018, SNK revealed the company was working on The King of Fighters XV, aiming to release it during 2020. Feeling the game's graphics were outdated for a 2016 game, SNK chairman Zhihui GE said the XV will use the Unreal Engine 4 to provide a better presentation. In retrospect, Oda said the SNK game studio was revived with KOFXIV, resulting in the company finally making more Samurai Shodowns, Fatal Fury and Art of Fighting games in future years. Oda wishes the company could keep doing this.

The King of Fighters XIV also inspired two printed adaptations. The first one is a manhua with the same name released in January 2017. The second one is a manga titled The King of Fighters: A New Beginning written by Kyōtarō Azuma. Kodansha published the series Magazine Pocket beginning in January 2018. Seven Seas Entertainment licensed the manga for a North-American edition for volumes to be released across 2020.
