= Silver Nina =

Japanese Manga Series

- Cover of the first volume

銀のニーナ (Shirogane no Nina)
- Genre: Drama, slice of life
- Manga
- Written by: Itokatsu
- Published by: Futabasha
- English publisher: NA: Crunchyroll Manga
- Imprint: Action Comics
- Magazine: Manga Action
- Original run: April 17, 2012 – August 6, 2019
- Volumes: 15

Silver Nina (銀のニーナ, Shirogane no Nina) is a Japanese manga series both written and illustrated by Itokatsu. The series was serialized in Futabasha's seinen manga magazine Manga Action from April 2012 to August 2019.

== Characters ==
Nina Shimazaki (志摩崎 ニーナ, Shimazaki Nina)
Voiced by: Ayaka Ōhashi (drama CD)
A young girl from Finland who moved to Japan in order to become an Akiba Idol.
Shuutarou Shimazaki (志摩崎 修太郎, Shimazaki Shuutarou)
Voiced by: Tomoaki Maeno (drama CD)
Nina's uncle who lost his job in Tokyo and therefore moved back home to live with his family in Tsumagoi, Gunma.
Tomomi Shinjō (新城巴, Shinjō Tomomi)
Voiced by: Aya Suzaki (drama CD)

== Publication ==
Written and illustrated by Itokatsu, Silver Nina was serialized in Futabasha's seinen manga magazine Manga Action from April 17, 2012, to August 6, 2019. Futabasha has compiled the chapters into fifteen tankōbon volumes from October 27, 2012, to November 28, 2019.

The series' chapters were published in English by Crunchyroll Manga as they were published in Japan.

=== Volume list ===
No.	Release date	ISBN
1	October 27, 2012	978-4-575-84148-0
1-8
2	March 28, 2013	978-4-575-84212-8
9-17
3	September 28, 2013	978-4-575-84291-3
18-26
4	March 28, 2014	978-4-575-84374-3
27-35
5	September 27, 2014	978-4-575-84490-0
36-44
6	March 27, 2015	978-4-575-84595-2
45-53
7	September 28, 2015	978-4-575-84688-1
54-62
8	March 28, 2016	978-4-575-84775-8
63-71
9	October 28, 2016	978-4-575-84872-4
72-80
10	April 28, 2017	978-4-575-84965-3
81-89
11	October 28, 2017	978-4-575-85052-9
90-98
12	May 28, 2018	978-4-575-85161-8
99-107
13	October 25, 2018	978-4-575-85226-4
14	April 26, 2019	978-4-575-85303-2
15	November 28, 2019	978-4-575-85380-3
