= Geese Howard =

- Fatal Fury, Art of Fighting and The King of Fighters character
- Geese Howard in Neo Geo Battle Coliseum by Eisuke Ogura
- First game: Fatal Fury: King of Fighters (1991)
- Created by: Takashi Nishiyama
- Voiced by: English: Ward Perry (Fatal Fury: Legend of the Hungry Wolf, Fatal Fury 2: The New Battle); Richard Epcar (Tekken 7, City of the Wolves); Japanese: Katsuhisa Namase (Fatal Fury Special); Kong Kuwata (all video games beginning with Fatal Fury 3, The King of Fighters: Destiny, Tekken 7 (special moves and grunts)); Hidekatsu Shibata (Fatal Fury: Legend of the Hungry Wolf, Fatal Fury: The Motion Picture); Masaaki Ōkura (Fatal Fury: Legend of the Hungry Wolf 2 (young)); Katsuji Mori (Dengeki Bunko CD drama: Garō Densetsu); Ryoko Gi (New Geese; The King of Fighters All Star)

In-universe information
- Fighting style: Ancient Martial Arts
- Origin: United States
- Nationality: American

Geese Howard (Japanese: ギース・ハワード, Hepburn: Gīsu Hawādo) is a fictional character and the main antagonist of SNK's Fatal Fury series. Debuting in Fatal Fury: King of Fighters, Geese is the local crime boss of the fictional city of South Town. Geese created and hosts a fighting tournament named "The King of Fighters", in which he faces the brothers Terry and Andy Bogard who want to take revenge for their father's death. Despite his apparent death in Real Bout Fatal Fury, he continues to appear in subsequent games as a "ghost" named Nightmare Geese (Japanese: ナイトメア・ギース, Hepburn: Naitomea Gīsu) as in The King of Fighters series, in which he seeks to get the power from the creature Orochi and often sends teams representing him. His young self makes an appearance in Art of Fighting 2 as a secret final boss character. He also appears as downloadable content in Bandai Namco's fighting game Tekken 7. Outside video games, Geese has appeared in the Fatal Fury animated adaptations as well as the CGI series The King of Fighters: Destiny.

Geese Howard was created by Takashi Nishiyama who was inspired by the The Godfather while his design often mixes Western and Eastern aspects. His popularity is one of the reason he often appears in The King of Fighters and Fatal Fury games following his death. When it came to gameplay, SNK created Geese to have special moves that makes him hard to defeat, most notably his ability to counter techniques. Tekken producer Katsuhiro Harada believed the character would fit in Tekken 7.

Video game journalists have given Geese popular response due to how overpowered Geese acts in his boss appearances across most of his story. Geese's reveal as guest character in Tekken 7 was met with acclaim due to how well he fit within the series' cast.

== Creation and development ==
=== Characterization ===
First appearing in an original video animation, the younger Geese Howard and was one of the few cases of the character wearing Western clothing.

Although Geese was not modeled after any famous person or fictional character, SNK based him on Italian mafia. Geese became famous for his special moves which allows him to interrupt the player's attacks and counterattack in a grab. Sub-boss Billy Kane obtained similar fame with both Geese and him having The Godfather-like influences that were expanded on later games. SNK was surprised by Geese's popularity in the Fatal Fury series, topping Terry Bogard in terms of fan response in regard to what players wanted as playable character. Real Bout Fatal Fury was originally created with the goal of putting an end to the series' story with Geese Howard's death in the ending, but Geese's high popularity resulted in Real Bout Special having him again.

According to writer Akihiko Ureshino, Geese's life as a fighter originally began with him being thoroughly beaten by Wolfgang, who was younger than him. Geese is said to have a genius sense for fighting arts, but he is not just a genius. Geese had obtained everything and reached the top, but regardless of the outcome, he put up the best fight with Terry. Calling as an arrogant ruler Geese never have considered the possibility of losing to Terry. However, the moment he actually lost to Terry, he felt strangely satisfied. Ureshino believes Terry had no intention of killing Geese and getting revenge, and at most he just wanted to defeat Geese and make Jeff apologize after he died. Ureshino thinks Terry's feelings were expressed when he instinctively reached out his hand to Geese as he was falling off the building. However, Geese refused even that, and selfishly ended his life, abandoning the future of Billy and the connections he had built up. Ureshino said there are many people who don't want to see Geese as an emaciated old man with gray hair, but perhaps the person who least wants to see him is Geese himself. In response to rumors that Geese was a hidden character in Garou, the Neo Geo staff denied it.

Geese was first added to franchise The King of Fighters in The King of Fighters '96. His inclusion highly awaited by developers and fans, as he was originally meant to appear in the previous game. Geese was partnered with two other SNK bosses, Mr. Big and Krauser. Even throughout the game, this boss team received special treatment. Leitmotif music were prepared for each member and at the time of this title's release, enthusiasm for this game reached a feverish pitch. Numerous special moves were prepared for Geese, but in view of the memory capacity and time required for adjustments, a number of moves had to be left out. He returned in The King of Fighters '98 Ultimate Match as one of the most played characters in early tests of the arcade. The alternate Geese was simply called "Ura" despite having new moves. In The King of Fighters 2002 Unlimited Match, Geese Howard carries his Real Bout Fatal Fury and the enhanced Nightmare Geese from Real Bout Fatal Fury Special. The character was meant to return in The King of Fighters XII and The King of Fighters XIII but the developers did not have the time to add him. Due to the importance of Geese's character to SNK, the company decided to include quickly in The King of Fighters XIV. This gave the team pressure in regards to adding his son Rock Howard as the character came from a game where Geese had been dead for a decade.

Katsuhiro Harada said that if he could add a guest character into Tekken 7 it would be Geese, praising the characters as he would fit into the cast. He added that both he and an interviewer liked the character which led to the idea of casting him into Tekken 7. While remaining true to Geese's character, Harada stated his movements and design were completely remade so that fans from other series will try to play Tekken 7 and learn its different mechanics. The King of Fighters XIV producer Yasuyuki Oda was pleased with Geese's inclusion in Tekken 7 and celebrated it by taking a picture with Harada.

=== Design ===
In the making of Fatal Fury: The King of Fighters, SNK had multiple doubts how his design should be until it was decided he would wear a gi based on martial arts, as well as his overall name, likeness, and appearance being references to the three boss characters Black Gallop, Geese, and King from SNK's previous Neo Geo game The Super Spy (1990). Despite being American, SNK wanted him to be a man inspired by Japanese culture resulting in his final look. The character's popularity in Fatal Fury and his younger look from the first original video animation influenced his appearance in Art of Fighting 2 as a hidden boss. The appearance of Geese in Art of Fighting 2 was of a younger man with long blond hair wearing a light purple and blue suit with red necktie. In the Fatal Fury and The King of Fighters, Geese appears as a middle-aged German American man with blond short, slicked hair, wearing a gi with red hakama and white uwagi without sandals. In most games of the Fatal Fury and The King of Fighters series - except Fatal Fury: King of Fighters and The King of Fighters '96 - Geese only wears the red hakama pants with the white uwagi either not present or hanging off the back/sides.

Dominated Mind, the PlayStation version of Real Bout Special, features Geese sporting a halo over his head as a reference to his passing, while the arcade version of Real Bout Special and The King of Fighters 2002: Unlimited Match features Geese sporting an aura of chi surrounding his feet, which would later be canonized in Maximum Impact 2 as "Nightmare Geese". If he was a completely bonus character who didn't interact with other characters, a living Geese instead of a Nightmare, but the Maximum Impact series has a grown-up Rock, and Billy is also participating this time, so the writer Akihiko Ureshino thinks they deliberately chose to have him appear in this form. For Urenshino, it was fun to think about the reactions of Rock, or Billy, who faced Geese's nightmare. Of course, players should also pay attention to how Terry and the other Garou characters, or Southtown characters like Alsowa and Ryo, react when they come face to face with the revived nightmare.

The development team behind The King of Fighters XIV found his design as one of the most challenging ones to make alongside Terry Bogard's. In the end, he kept his original look but topless. For his "Nightmare Geese", an alternate look was given to the character, making Geese look like a zombie with silver hair, rotten skin and purple flames. For The King of Fighters XV, Tomohiro Nakata designed Geese with his business suit but with an emphasis on the black color, believing it fits his evil personality and reinforces his connection with the Howard Connection. Nakata also claimed that Geese's classic gi was still available to select, finding his hakama iconic.

== Appearances ==
=== In video games ===
Geese first appears as the final boss of Fatal Fury: King of Fighters. Backstory material reveals that he and fellow martial artist Jeff Bogard trained together under Tung Fu Rue, but he became jealous when Tung chose Jeff as his successor, leading him to murder Jeff in front of his adopted sons Terry and Andy. The central plot of the game centers around the Bogard brothers returning ten years later to avenge their father by defeating Geese in his "King of Fighters" tournament. After the player defeats Geese, he falls from the top of the building, being declared dead during the game's ending. While Geese does not appear in Fatal Fury 2, the plot revolves around his half brother Wolfgang Krauser seeking out the Bogard brothers to test himself against Geese's killers. Geese returns in the revised version of the game, Fatal Fury Special, where it is revealed that he survived his fall at the end of the first game. Fatal Fury 3: Road to the Final Victory centers around Geese's attempt to return to power by collecting the "Sacred Scrolls of Jin", which is said to give their holder great power.

In the next game, Real Bout Fatal Fury, Geese is once again the final boss in the single-player tournament, confronting the player atop Geese Tower. In either, Terry's or Andy's ending, Geese falls off his tower once again, refusing to accept help from either of the Bogard brothers, leaving Terry to later raise Geese's young son, Rock Howard. Although this game was developed with the intention of featuring the character's death, Geese's popularity resulted in him still appearing in the next titles. Geese appears in the subsequent game which does not feature a plot, Real Bout Fatal Fury Special, as a hidden final boss named Nightmare Geese. He also appears as a regular character in Real Bout Fatal Fury 2, as well as Wild Ambition, a remake of the first Fatal Fury game. In Fatal Fury: City of the Wolves, Nightmare Geese initially appeared as non-playable boss character before being made playable via downloadable content. The story reveals that before his death, Geese ordered the Sacred Scrolls destroyed due to being descended from the Jin family through the Stroheims, hoping to prevent himself and Rock from inheriting the scrolls' curse, and willingly distanced himself from his wife and son to protect them from his enemies.

Geese also makes an appearance in the second game in the Art of Fighting series. Art of Fighting 2, which is set a decade before the first Fatal Fury, features a younger Geese Howard as the corrupt police commissioner of Southtown. Geese is revealed to be Mr. Big's boss and the mastermind behind the events of the previous game such as the kidnapping of Yuri Sakazaki. If the player wins every match against all the previous computer-controlled opponents without losing a round, the player's character will face Geese Howard as a hidden final boss. In the non-canon crossover video games NeoGeo Battle Coliseum and the SNK vs. Capcom series, Geese appears as a playable character; in the latter he commonly appears as a boss character.

Geese also appears in a few games in The King of Fighters series, which does not follow the continuity established by the Fatal Fury and Art of Fighting games, despite sharing many characters and plot elements. In The King of Fighters '96, Geese serves as the leader of the "Boss Team" along with former subordinate Mr. Big and rival Wolfgang Krauser, seeking to find the Orochi power. Geese would appear again in a non-playable role as the sponsor of the "Special Team" in The King of Fighters '97, which is composed of Billy Kane, Blue Mary, and Ryuji Yamazaki. The team would reappear in The King of Fighters 2003 renamed "Outlaw Team", with Mary (now part of the Women Fighters Team) replaced by Gato from Mark of the Wolves. Geese also appears in The King of Fighters 2000 as a striker, in the Xbox version of The King of Fighters 2002 and The King of Fighters XI as a selectable character, as well as in The King of Fighters '98: Ultimate Match, which brings back the Boss Team from '96. He is also a playable character in The King of Fighters 2002 Unlimited Match, alongside his "Nightmare" variant. The younger version of Geese from Art of Fighting 2 also appears as a boss in The King of Fighters Neowave. He also returned in The King of Fighters XIV as a playable character alongside Billy and his butler, Hein. In the ending, Geese reveals he has not unlocked the secrets of the Jin scrolls yet but these scrolls predicted the events of the tournament.

Outside the main The King of Fighters game, he has been present in the spin-offs. In The King of Fighters Kyo he appears in South Town where he antagonizes the Bogard brothers as well as the protagonist, Kyo Kusanagi. In The King of Fighters EX: Neo Blood Geese organizes a new tournament in order to obtain the power from the participant Iori Yagami. After Iori is defeated, Geese will act as a boss character. In KOF: Maximum Impact 2 and Regulation A, Geese is playable under the name of Nightmare Geese. His normal persona appears in the mobile phone game The King of Fighters All Star as well as '98 Ultimate Match Online. His Art of Fighting persona is also available in Kimi wa Hero.

Geese appears as a playable guest fighter in Tekken 7 as downloadable character. He also appeared in Nintendo's Super Smash Bros. Ultimate as a background character in the King of Fighters Stadium stage and a spirit.

=== In other media ===
Geese Howard also appears in a trilogy of animated films based on the Fatal Fury video games, where his voice is provided by Hidekatsu Shibata in the original Japanese versions and Ward Perry in the English dubs. The first two installments, 1992's Fatal Fury: Legend of the Hungry Wolf and 1993's Fatal Fury 2: The New Battle, both aired in Japan as TV specials on Fuji TV, while the third film, 1994's Fatal Fury: The Motion Picture, was a theatrical film. The English adaptations of all three films were released on home video by Viz Communications. The first two films loosely follows the storyline of the games and both feature Geese as a major character, establishing him and Wolfgang Krauser as half-brothers who share the same father, a plot element which was used in the video game series with Fatal Fury Special. Geese makes a cameo appearance in the third film.

In addition to appearing in manga adaptations of the Fatal Fury, Art of Fighting and The King of Fighters games published in Japan, Geese Howard was also the subject of a single-volume manga published in 1996 titled The Geese Howard Story by Etsuya Amajishi, adapting the character's fictional history from the Art of Fighting and Fatal Fury games. It was followed by a single-volume sequel in 1997 titled Geese in the Dark, by the same author. Geese also appears in many CD dramas and stars in his own character image album. He also sings in a number of image songs. In the CGI adaptation of The King of Fighters, Geese reprises his role from Fatal Fury with one episode showing his background and how he met Jeff Bogard, Terry and Andy's father.

== Critical reception ==
While interviewing Shane Bettenhausen, Ignition Entertainment's Director of Business Development, Alex Lucard from Diehardgamefan.com mentioned that one of the characters he wanted to be playable in The King of Fighters XII was Geese. Video games publications have added praise and criticism on Geese's character. Den of Geek listed him as the fifth best The King of Fighters character commenting he is likable despite being an antagonist as well his moves that allow him to counter enemies' attacks. GameAxis Unwired found the character as one of the most challenging ones, comparing him with other SNK bosses Wolfgang Krauser and Rugal Bernstein, finding the latter more difficult to beat though. Complex listed him as one of the most challenging bosses in gaming, citing the focus of his fights as well as how the character is hated by many other ones in the story.

GameSpot reviewer Frank Provo comments that Geese's introduction in Fatal Fury is one of the biggest accomplishments from the game as he notes how Geese continues appearing in other games. Avi Krebs from Gamingexcellence.com noted that Geese was the hardest character of the series to defeat and jokingly commented that even though he fights "while wearing a wristwatch, he pulls out all the tricks possible". IGN writer Ryan Clements agreed with Avi Krebs saying that Geese is "almost physically impossible to beat". He also mentioned that due to how difficult Geese is, almost twelve different IGN people had to help Clements to win, being only able to defeat him "resorting to the cheapest, most absurd tactics possible". Eric Bratcher from GamesRadar commented that Geese is "the big hook" from the series along with Terry Bogard, labelling Geese as "nearly un-killable". The Nightmare Geese version from The King of Fighters 2002: Unlimited Match was compared with Street Fighter's Shin Akuma in terms of difficulties by Eurogamer writer Matt Edwards who described him as one of the strongest opponents in the game. Greg Kasavin from the same site listed his "Knockdown Throw" special move as the third best move in fighting games commenting that it was one of the first reversal moves ever made in video games way before they became popular. For this reason, Kasavin stated that Geese became "one of the greatest fighting game characters of all time". TheGamer commented that while Geese dies in Real Bout Fatal Fury, his returns in The King of Fighters with XV retaining scrolls with potential for immortality have potential to revive him like other villains in gaming who die several times like Dracula from Castlevania. Red Bull regarded Geese as one of the "cheapest" fighting game characters for the challenges he gives the players enough to annoy them. KOF XIV featured father and son, thus earning praised for providing this desire encounter. TJ Denzer from ShackNews praised the handling of Nightmare Geese in City of the Wolves for his handling "rekka" special moves, demanding patience for gamers who aim to control him.

Raphael See criticized Geese's final fight against Terry Bogard in the series' first original video animation as due to the chi-like techniques performed by the two fighters rather than actual regular martial arts. Upon his addition to Tekken 7 as downloadable content, Suriel Vazquez from Game Informer said Geese would be a good addition despite not being his "favorite Howard". Gavin Jasper from Den of Geek found Geese's reveal as surprising due to lack of possibilities the character would appear as a guest. Nevertheless, he found Geese would fit into the cast as various Tekken are poor parents, specifically comparing him with Tekken's character Heihachi Mishima due to their actions across their respective series. Similarly, Polygon found Geese "legendary" and found this crossover between SNK and Namco as this was the first time a character from the SNK's games appeared into one of Namco. VideoGamer.com said that while Geese is "a bit of a horrible bastard really, but in a game like this [Tekken 7], that means fun". HardcoreGamer praised the translation of Geese's techniques into the trailer as well as his design as provided by the Unreal Engine 4 commenting that they are "really shining when it comes to his facial expressions and extensive body scarring". Game Axis shared similar comments and liked how Tekken gathered villains from the other games with the first one being Akuma.
