= The King of Fighters All Star =

2018 video game

- Promotional cover of The King of Fighters All Star
- Developer: Netmarble Neo
- Publisher: Netmarble
- Engine: Unity
- Platforms: Android, iOS, Microsoft Windows
- Release: Mobile: JP: July 26, 2018; KR: May 9, 2019; WW: October 22, 2019; Microsoft Windows: WW: February 10, 2022
- Genres: Beat 'em up, action role-playing
- Mode: Single-player

The King of Fighters All Star (Note: Stylized as The King of Fighters ALLSTAR) (KOFAS) was a beat 'em up action role-playing game developed by Netmarble Neo and published by Netmarble. It was first released in Japan on July 26, 2018, for the iOS and Android.

The game is a retelling of SNK's The King of Fighters games with the player being able to create their own team as they battle across multiple annual tournaments. It was released in English regions on October 22, 2019.

A Microsoft Windows version is also available, starting from its beta version on February 10, 2022. The game ended service on October 30, 2024.

== Gameplay ==
Gameplay featuring Kyo Kusanagi as playable character and Benimaru Nikaido as Striker. The bottom right options indicate what special moves he can perform.

The King of Fighters All Star is a beat 'em up with elements of an action role-playing game, similar to River City Ransom and its spiritual successors River City Ransom: Underground and River City Girls. The player controls one character as he engages multiple enemies until reaching the boss of the stage. The character possesses normal techniques and special moves as well as Desperation Moves. The last two cannot be used consecutively as the player is given time to prepare for the next usage of the move. When first playing, the game offers the player a choice of the characters Kyo Kusanagi, Terry Bogard and Ryo Sakazaki. However, upon passing the first stage, the player can select randomly new characters developed by SNK. All characters carry a number of stars depending on how strong they can become and from what title they originate. For example, the first Kyo is his incarnation from The King of Fighters '94 but can be replaced by other incarnations of Kyo who possess more stars. Every time a stage is cleared, the player obtains different types of objects for multiple purposes such as increasing experience and raising stats, as well as rubies to summon more characters or restore their health.

The game often offers alternative versions of the characters that can only be obtained through events such as Halloween versions of Yashiro Nanakase or Kula Diamond.

== Development ==
The game was first announced in Chokaigi 2017 where the developers stated they would bring the franchise composed of fighting games to role-playing games. The first teaser was released in May 2018. Global version manager Ying Chen states that the developers aimed for players to make their own types of teams per preference. In regards to the timing between the original Eastern and Western versions, Chen said that the developers wanted Westerns to receive the same treatment. SNK wanted to create a mobile game offering fun of control. They focused on letting players to enjoy multiple combination and powerful sense of hitting through simple moves. The cards were added in order to provide a sort of strategic feeling. It was developed be appealed by a wide range of players. In order to make the game stand within other mobile phone games, the team added multiplayer options, something rare in the market. SNK stated that Netmarble already had a large experience within mobile phone games worldwidely and wanted them to continue with this tradition.

The translation from the fighting game system to a side-scrolling game was felt be well executed by the developers. The game was created with the Unity engine with SNK wishing to create appealing graphics in the process. While the game offers the player the idea of buying different features, the company wanted to still give them freedom in regards to what they could do. The development team worked to make everything seem unique, that the basic attacks seem like signature moves. Writer Akihiko Ureshino stated SNK will not use characters from the EX spin-off games from the Game Boy Advance and instead Maximum Impact characters from the PlayStation 2 as the former were noted to be less popular than the latter.

All Star has added many guest characters in collaboration with other franchises, including SNK's Samurai Shodown series; Hideaki Sorachi's Shueisha manga series Gin Tama; Bandai Namco's Tekken and Soulcalibur series; Netmarble's Seven Knights game; Nakaba Suzuki's Kodansha manga series The Seven Deadly Sins; Koei Tecmo's Dead or Alive series; Arc System Works's Guilty Gear series; Capcom's Street Fighter series; Sega's Virtua Fighter series; and several WWE professional wrestlers. To promote the addition of Samurai Shodown characters, Kyo was portrayed by Yuichi Nakamura for a commercial alongside Hiroshi Fujioka as Haohmaru. Nakamura reflects enjoying this work due to admiring his superiors, most notably Fujioka. Shin Hwa Cho from Netmarble expressed excitement in regards to the WWE collaboration as it would appeal to newcomers to the series. Brian Flinn from WWE shared similar feelings as it would popularize the wrestlers throughout the game.

== Release ==
The King of Fighters All Star was released in Japan on 26 July 2018 and South Korea on 9 May 2019. On 27 June 2024, Netmarble announced the service would shut down between October 30 and 31, 2024.

== Reception ==
All Star got a 16 out of 20 by Jeux Video. Multiplayer scored it a 7.3 out of 10. Kotaku praised the presentation and gameplay but noted that the usage of microtransactions might leave players with mixed thoughts in regards to the need of collecting as many fighters they want.

All Star also made it to Apple's Best of 2019.
