= SNK Heroines: Tag Team Frenzy =

2018 video game

- Nintendo Switch cover art
- Developers: KOF Studio; Abstraction Games (Switch, Steam); Taito (Arcade)
- Publishers: Nintendo Switch, PlayStation 4: JP: SNK Corporation; AS: SEGA; WW: NIS America; Arcade: JP: Taito; Windows: WW: SNK Corporation; AS: Sega
- Directors: Kaito Soranaka; Tatsuya Hayashi
- Producer: Yasuyuki Oda
- Designers: Hiroya Kobayashi; Hayato Konya; Misa Hirayama
- Artists: Yusuke Amono; Naoto Abe; Eisuke Ogura
- Composers: Mayuko Hino; Minori Sasaki; Naoki Kita
- Platforms: Nintendo Switch; PlayStation 4 Arcade; Microsoft Windows
- Release: Nintendo Switch, PlayStation 4: JP: September 6, 2018; WW: September 7, 2018; Arcade: JP: October 11, 2018; Windows; February 21, 2019
- Genre: Fighting
- Modes: Single-player, multiplayer

SNK Heroines: Tag Team Frenzy (Note: Japanese: SNKヒロインズ 〜Tag Team Frenzy〜, Hepburn: SNK Hiroinzu Taggu Chīmu Furenjī) is a fighting game developed for PS4 by KOF Studio and for Nintendo Switch and PC by Abstraction Games. The game was released for the Nintendo Switch and PlayStation 4 in September 2018 and was published in Japan and Asia by SNK and SEGA and in International version by NIS America. An arcade version was released the following October and the Microsoft Windows version arrived in February 2019. It is a spiritual successor to SNK Gals' Fighters and features a 2v2 tag-team gameplay system, which was also used in Kizuna Encounter: Super Tag Battle.

== Gameplay ==
A fight between Mai Shiranui and Kula Diamond. The top health bars belong to the characters fighting, the others to the assistants.

As the game's title suggests, SNK Heroines: Tag Team Frenzy is a versus fighting game where each player uses two characters per fight but the players also choose an "Attacker" that serves as the playable character as well as a "Supporter" that assist the former. In contrast to other fighting games, it is impossible to defeat the enemy with a normal move, necessitating the use of a finishing move called the "Dream Finish". A move button can protect the character, while items are included for further gameplay features.

The game offers a story with different dialogues occurring depending on the characters fighting. Each character has additional costumes; cosmetic items are available to the players if they wish to change their characters' visual appearances. There is an online mode alongside an Spectator Mode where players can see other people's fights.

== Plot ==
The story takes place between the events of The King of Fighters XIV and XV. Following the previous King of Fighters tournament, several female fighters suddenly fall unconscious. Upon waking, they find themselves in a strange mansion, along with some male fighters who have been changed into women. The mastermind, Kukri, announces that he has trapped them in his castle in a pocket dimension, and they must battle each other for a chance to return home. He secretly plans to use the energy generated from their fights to empower an ancient statue in the castle that will merge his pocket dimension with the real world, allowing him to gather more women into his collection. When only two fighters remain, Kukri confronts them directly to obtain the last bit of energy needed, but is defeated by the two heroines. Kukri has a mental breakdown and escapes as the pocket dimension collapses, and all the fighters are returned to their dreams shortly before reawakening.

== Characters ==
Characters listed in bold are post-release downloadable content characters, characters listed in italics are guest characters.

- Athena Asamiya
- Kukri (Note: Non-playable boss character)
- Kula Diamond
- Leona Heidern
- Love Heart
- Luong
- Mai Shiranui
- Mian
- **Miss X** (Note: Male-to-female genderbend version of character)
- **Jeanne D'Arc**
- Mui Mui
- Nakoruru
- Shermie
- **Skullo Mania**
- Sylvie Paula Paula
- Terry Bogard
- **Thief Arthur**
- Yuri Sakazaki
- Zarina

== Development ==
Following the success of SNK's The King of Fighters XIV fighting game, SNK already had plans to make a sequel, The King of Fighters XV. However, they instead decided to develop a more light-hearted game solely focused on female fighters. Producer Yasuyuki Oda stated that while initial mentions of the game made the mechanics sound more simplified than previous games, the team also worked highly in a complex system which would attract experts in the genre. The game is one of SNK's first projects for a Nintendo console in several years; however, the game was also developed for Sony's PlayStation 4.

The gameplay was designed to be completely different from that of The King of Fighters XIV due to its distinctive features. In order to promote the game outside Japan, SNK made a partnership with NIS America to gather attention in the West. The sexualization of female characters was made on purpose, although Oda stated that characters like Mai Shiranui have received this reaction in many other games. Nevertheless, the team worked in order to make members of the cast retain their original characterization despite the change in looks. Due to negative feedback from BlazBlue: Cross Tag Battle's use of downloadable content, the company intends to avoid having these types of marketing for the released game that will be released on stores. The game is similar to a previous SNK title, SNK Gals' Fighters, which used only female characters with the exception of the male crossdressing fighter Iori Yagami as "Miss X". The SNK staff received feedback from many fans who wanted Miss X within the game, but could not confirm whether Miss X would make an appearance; Miss X was later announced as downloadable content. SNK also stated one of the playable characters would surprise the fans. Producer Alan Costa stated the team is confident in how the game will be localized for Westerns following issues with the localization of Ys VIII: Lacrimosa of Dana. As part of cross-promotional collaborations with Arika and Square Enix, Thief Arthur from Million Arthur and a female version of Skullomania from Fighting EX Layer appear as downloadable guest characters, in exchange for Terry Bogard and Iori Yagami appearing in Fighting EX Layer and Million Arthur: Arcana Blood respectively.

The game was released for PlayStation 4 and Nintendo Switch in mid-2018, with SNK aiming for equivalent graphics and performance across the two platforms. The limited edition for both consoles includes extra material, including an artbook, a two-CD original soundtrack, a shirt and a "Fatal Cutie" cap. An arcade version of the game was released in October 2018.

== Reception ==
Reception

Aggregate score
Aggregator	Score
Metacritic	PS4: 60/100; Switch: 60/100

Review scores
Publication	Score
Destructoid	7/10
Famitsu	31/40
Hardcore Gamer	3/5
Nintendo Life	7/10
Nintendo World Report	6.5/10
Pocket Gamer	2.5/5

SNK Heroines: Tag Team Frenzy received a mixed critical reception upon release. Ben MacRae from outlet Crash Landed rated the title a 3/5, praising the art and animation but criticized the "empty stage design" and "lack of unlockables". Chris DeVisser from PlayStation Universe awarded the title 4/10, critical of the "simple combat system" and considering it a "weak entry" in the SNK fighting game history.

As of April 2019, the game has sold 300,000 units.
