= List of Neo Geo Pocket games =

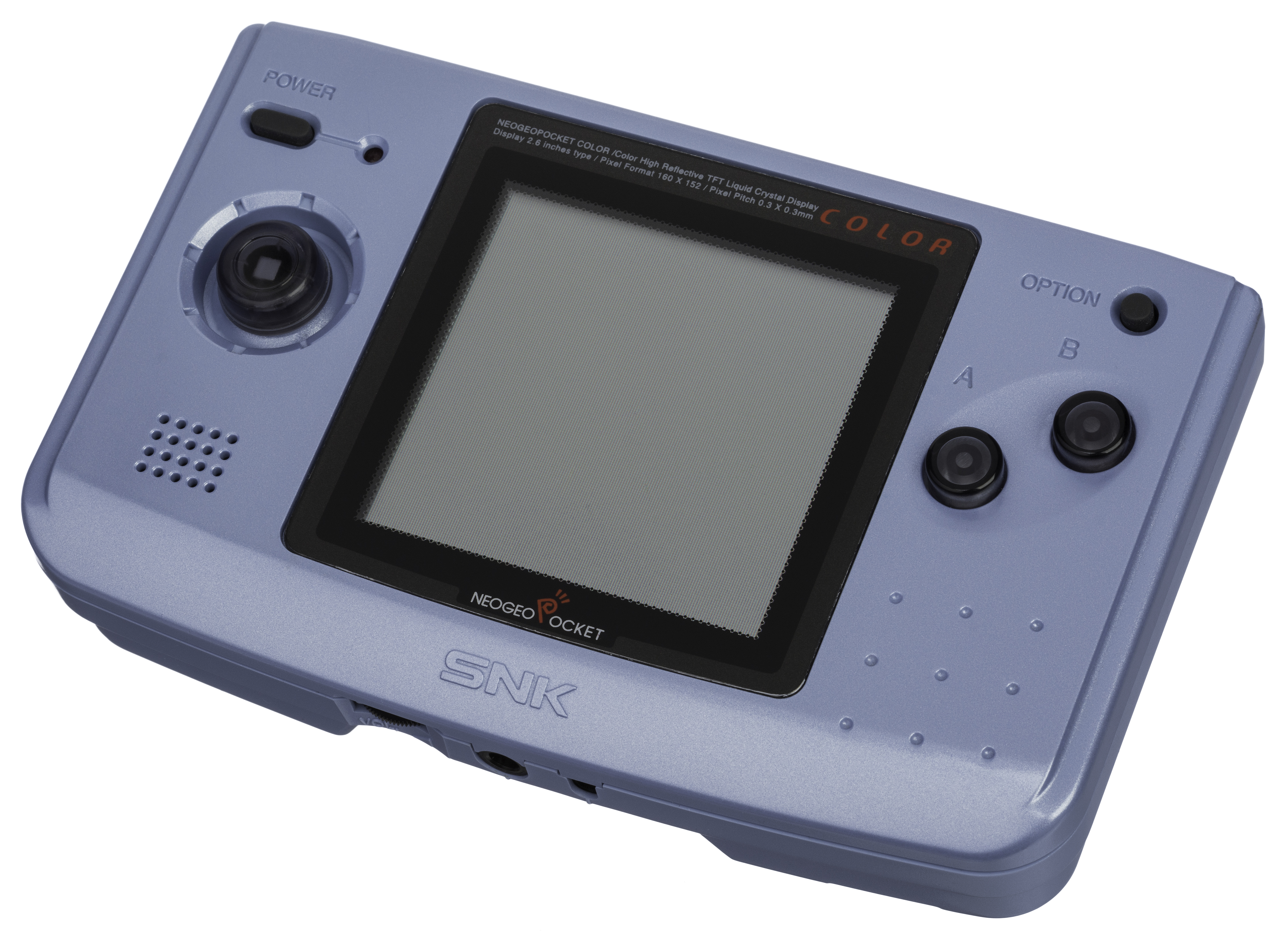
The Neo Geo Pocket Color

The Neo Geo Pocket is a handheld video game console released by SNK in 1998. A total of nine games were released for the original monochrome model, and 73 games were released for the Neo Geo Pocket Color, which was released in 1999.

== Games ==
=== Neo Geo Pocket ===
A total of 9 games were released for the original Neo Geo Pocket, all of which remain playable on the Neo Geo Pocket Color. Games that later received color re-releases are noted accordingly.

Title	Developer(s)	Publisher(s)	Color re‑release	Release date
Baseball Stars	Saurus, SNK	SNK	Yes	October 28, 1998
King of Fighters R-1	SNK	SNK	No	October 28, 1998
Master of Syougi	ADK	SNK	Yes	November 20, 1998
Melon-chan's Growth Diary	ADK	SNK	No	October 28, 1998
Neo Cherry Master	DYNA	SNK	Yes	December 25, 1998
Neo Geo Cup '98 Plus	SNK	SNK	Yes	October 28, 1998
Pocket Tennis	Yumekobo	SNK	Yes	October 28, 1998
Puzzle Link	Yumekobo	SNK	Yes	October 28, 1998
Samurai Shodown!	Saurus, SNK	SNK	No	December 25, 1998

=== Neo Geo Pocket Color ===
There are currently 73 (Note: This number is always up to date by this script.) games on this list. Games that can be played on the monochrome Neo Geo Pocket are noted as backwards compatible.

Region code guide
Region	Description
NA	North America and NTSC territories besides Japan. 31 games.
JP	Japanese (NTSC-J) formatted release. All 73 games.
EU	PAL region release, includes much of Europe, Australia, and parts of Asia. 39 games.

Title	Developer(s)	Publisher(s)	Backwards compatible	Release date		
Title	Developer(s)	Publisher(s)	Backwards compatible	NA	JP	EU
Baseball Stars Color	Saurus, SNK	SNK	Yes	May 31, 1999	March 19, 1999	December 11, 1999
Big Bang Pro Wrestling	S-Neo, SNK	SNK	No	Unreleased	November 23, 2000	Unreleased
Bikkuriman 2000 Viva! Pocket Festival	Sega Toys	Sega Toys	No	Unreleased	March 16, 2000	Unreleased
Biomotor Unitron	Yumekobo	SNK	Yes	July 31, 1999	April 15, 1999	1999
Bust-a-Move Pocket Puzzle Bobble Mini^{JP}	Ukiyotei, Taito	SNK	Yes	April 30, 1999	March 26, 1999	1999
Cool Boarders Pocket	UEP Systems	UEP Systems (JP), SNK (EU)	No	Unreleased	February 24, 2000	2000
Cool Cool Jam	SNK	SNK	No	Unreleased	October 8, 2000	Unreleased
Crush Roller	ADK	SNK	Yes	April 30, 1999	April 15, 1999	1999
Dark Arms: Beast Buster	Noise Factory, SNK	SNK	Yes	November 23, 1999	October 21, 1999	December 11, 1999
Delta Warp	Iosys	Iosys	No	Unreleased	October 8, 2000	Unreleased
Densha de Go! 2	Taito	SNK	Yes	Unreleased	October 21, 1999	Unreleased
Dive Alert: Becky's Version	Sacnoth	SNK	Yes	April 16, 2000	August 19, 1999	2000
Dive Alert: Matt's Version	Sacnoth	SNK	Yes	April 16, 2000	August 19, 1999	2000
Doko Demo Mahjong	ADK	SNK	Yes	Unreleased	April 29, 1999	Unreleased
Dynamite Slugger	ADK	SNK	No	Unreleased	May 25, 2000	2000
Evolution: Eternal Dungeons	Sting, ESP	SNK	No	Unreleased	October 2, 2000	2000
Fantastic Night Dreams: Cotton	Success	Success (JP), SNK (EU)	Yes	Unreleased	March 23, 2000	June 16, 2000
Faselei!	Sacnoth	SNK	Yes	Unreleased	December 22, 1999	2000
Fatal Fury: First Contact	Yumekobo, SNK	SNK	Yes	April 30, 1999	May 27, 1999	October 1, 1999
Ganbare Neo Poke-Kun	SNK	SNK	No	Unreleased	June 6, 2000	Unreleased
Infinity Cure	KID	KID	No	Unreleased	November 23, 2000	Unreleased
Kikou Seiki Unitron	Yumekobo	SNK	No	Unreleased	January 20, 2000	Unreleased
The King of Fighters: Battle de Paradise	SNK	SNK	No (Note: When inserted in a Neo Geo Pocket, a hidden remake of the 1979 SNK arcade game Yosaku can be played.)	Unreleased	June 7, 2000	Unreleased
King of Fighters R-2	SNK	SNK	Yes	April 30, 1999	March 19, 1999	October 1, 1999
Koi Koi Mahjong	Visco	Visco	No	Unreleased	September 3, 2000	Unreleased
The Last Blade: Beyond the Destiny	Saurus, SNK	SNK	No	March 31, 2000	March 16, 2000	2000
Magical Drop Pocket	SAS Sakata, Data East	Data East (JP), SNK (INT)	Yes	May 12, 1999	June 24, 1999	April 3, 2000
Master of Syougi Color	ADK	SNK	Yes	Unreleased	March 19, 1999	Unreleased
Memories Off Pure	KID	KID	No	Unreleased	April 27, 2000	Unreleased
Metal Slug 1st Mission	Ukiyotei, SNK	SNK	Yes	1999	May 27, 1999	2000
Metal Slug 2nd Mission	Ukiyotei, SNK	SNK	No	May 22, 2000	September 3, 2000	April 28, 2000
Mezase! Kanji-Ō	SNK	SNK	No	Unreleased	January 20, 2000	Unreleased
Mizuki Shigeru Yōkai Shashinkan	Ukiyotei, SNK	SNK	No	Unreleased	December 29, 1999	Unreleased
Neo 21	DYNA	SNK	Yes	January 31, 2000	December 29, 1999	November 2, 2000
Neo Baccarat	DYNA	SNK	Yes	Unreleased	June 22, 2000	June 16, 2000
Neo Cherry Master Color	DYNA	SNK	Yes	April 30, 1999	March 19, 1999	October 1, 1999
Neo Derby Champ Dayosō	DYNA	SNK	Yes	Unreleased	April 22, 1999	Unreleased
Neo Dragon's Wild	DYNA	SNK	Yes	April 30, 1999	March 19, 1999	October 1, 1999
Neo Geo Cup '98 Plus Color	SNK	SNK	Yes	1999	April 15, 1999	October 10, 1999
Neo Mystery Bonus	DYNA	SNK	Yes	April 30, 1999	March 19, 1999	October 1, 1999
Neo Poke Pro Yakyū	ADK	SNK	Yes	Unreleased	May 27, 1999	Unreleased
Neo Turf Masters	Saurus, SNK	SNK	Yes	July 31, 1999	July 29, 1999	October 1, 1999
Nige-ron-pa	Dennou Club	Dennou Club	No	Unreleased	November 23, 2000	Unreleased
Ogre Battle Gaiden: Prince of Zenobia	SNK	SNK	No	Unreleased	June 22, 2000	Unreleased
Pac-Man	Namco	Namco, SNK	Yes	July 31, 1999	August 26, 1999	October 1, 1999
PachiSlot Aruze Kingdom - Azteca	Aruze	Aruze	No	Unreleased	October 2, 2000	Unreleased
PachiSlot Aruze Kingdom - Dekahel	Aruze	Aruze	No	Unreleased	January 15, 2001	Unreleased
PachiSlot Aruze Kingdom - Del Sol 2	Aruze	Aruze	No	Unreleased	October 26, 2000	Unreleased
PachiSlot Aruze Kingdom - e-CUP	Aruze	Aruze	No	Unreleased	March 29, 2001	Unreleased
PachiSlot Aruze Kingdom - Hanabi	Aruze	Aruze	Yes	Unreleased	October 21, 1999	Unreleased
PachiSlot Aruze Kingdom - Ōhanabi	Aruze	Aruze	No	Unreleased	December 14, 2000	Unreleased
PachiSlot Aruze Kingdom - Porcano 2	Aruze	Aruze	No	Unreleased	July 20, 2000	Unreleased
PachiSlot Aruze Kingdom - Ward of Lights	Aruze	Aruze	No	Unreleased	March 16, 2000	Unreleased
Pachinko Hisshō Guide: Pocket Parlor	Japan Vistec	Japan Vistec	Yes	Unreleased	November 25, 1999	Unreleased
Party Mail	ADK	SNK	Yes	Unreleased	December 22, 1999	Unreleased
Picture Puzzle	Success	Success (JP), SNK (EU)	No	Unreleased	April 27, 2000	June 16, 2000
Pocket Love: If	KID	KID	Yes	Unreleased	October 21, 1999	Unreleased
Pocket Reversi	Success	Success (JP), SNK (EU)	No	Unreleased	January 27, 2000	2000
Pocket Tennis Color	Yumekobo	SNK	Yes	March 19, 1999	April 30, 1999	October 1, 1999
Puyo Pop	Compile, Sega	SNK	Yes	July 22, 1999	September 30, 1999	November 26, 1999
Puzzle Link Renketsu Puzzle Tsunagete Pon! Color^{JP}	Yumekobo	SNK	Yes	September 30, 1999	March 19, 1999	1999
Puzzle Link 2 Tsunagete Pon! 2^{JP}	Yumekobo	SNK	No	January 4, 2000	November 11, 1999	March 24, 2000
Rockman Battle & Fighters	Capcom	Capcom	Yes	Unreleased	June 7, 2000	Unreleased
Samurai Shodown! 2	Saurus, SNK	SNK	Yes	April 30, 1999	October 6, 1999	2000
Shanghai Mini	SNK	SNK	Yes	2000	July 29, 1999	2000
SNK Gals' Fighters	Yumekobo	SNK	No	February 19, 2000	January 27, 2000	2000
SNK vs. Capcom: Card Fighters' Clash - Capcom Version	SNK	SNK	Yes	November 30, 1999	October 21, 1999	1999
SNK vs. Capcom: Card Fighters' Clash - SNK Version	SNK	SNK	Yes	1999	October 21, 1999	1999
SNK vs. Capcom: Card Fighters 2 Expand Edition	SNK	SNK	No	Unreleased	September 13, 2001	Unreleased
SNK vs. Capcom: Match of the Millennium	SNK	SNK	No	November 30, 1999	December 22, 1999	1999
Sonic the Hedgehog Pocket Adventure	SNK	SNK	No	December 4, 1999	December 16, 1999	February 25, 2000
Soreike! Hanafuda Dōjō	DYNA	DYNA	Yes	Unreleased	December 16, 1999	Unreleased
Super Real Mahjong Premium Collection	SETA	SNK	No	Unreleased	March 29, 2001	Unreleased
