= Daiki Nakamura (actor) =

Japanese voice actor (born 1962)

- 中村 大樹
- Born: December 25, 1962 (age 63); Tokyo, Japan
- Occupation: Voice actor
- Years active: 1981–2024

Daiki Nakamura (中村 大樹, Nakamura Daiki; born December 25, 1962 in Tokyo) is a Japanese former voice actor. Some of his best-known work includes Gaine in The Brave Express Might Gaine, Grandpa in Grandpa Danger, and Haohmaru from SNK Corporation's Samurai Shodown series.

Nakamura used to belong to 81 Produce, but 81 Produce interviewed Nakamura after there were complaints about power and sexual harassment, financial troubles, etc. at Yume Kobo, a private school for aspiring voice actors that he was the representative of. As he acknowledged this, the contract was terminated on March 21, 2024.

== Filmography ==
=== Anime ===
- After War Gundam X (Shingo Mori)
- Aoki Densetsu Shoot! (Junji Iwagami)
- Brave Exkaiser (Sky Max, God Max)
- The Brave Express Might Gaine (Gaine, Might Gaine, Great Might Gaine, Great Might Gaine Perfect Mode)
- Colorful (Kariya)
- Cromartie High School (Friend of Pootan)
- Dragon Ball Z (Bun)
- Fatal Fury: Legend of the Hungry Wolf (Billy Kane)
- Fatal Fury 2: The New Battle (Kim Kaphwan)
- Flame of Recca (Mokuren Nagai)
- Grandpa Danger (Grandpa)
- Gurren Lagann (Dayakka)
- Hunter × Hunter (2011) (Welfin)
- Initial D Fourth Stage (Toru Suetsugu)
- InuYasha (Orochidayu)
- Monster Rancher (Gray Wolf)
- Mahojin Guru Guru (Gatari (ep. 8–10))
- Naruto (Inoichi Yamanaka)
- Naruto Shippuden (Inoichi Yamanaka)
- Pokémon (Gentleman, Yas Gym Leader)
- Rockman EXE (Thunderman)
- Rockman EXE Axess (Thunderman)
- Rockman EXE Stream (Thunderman)
- Rockman EXE Beast+ (Thunderman, Phantom Thunderman)
- Yoroiden-Samurai Troopers (Seiji Date)
- Sailor Moon S (Ukon Katakuri)
- Slayers (Rahanimu)
- Shooting Star Rockman (Cancer)
- Shooting Star Rockman Tribe (Cancer)
- Yaiba (Tsukikage)
- Yu-Gi-Oh! Duel Monsters GX (Kosuke Kunisaki)

=== Original video animation (OVA) ===
- Bio Hunter (Police Officer)
- Birdy the Mighty (Salamander)
- Samurai Spirits 2: Asura Zanmaeden (Haohmaru)
- Sohryuden: Legend of the Dragon Kings (Owaru Ryudo)
- Mutant Turtles: Superman Legend (Leonardo)
- Arslan Senki (Kishuard)
- Iron Virgin Jun from 1992 (Kurata (Daiba) Ohnami)

=== Films ===
- Fatal Fury: The Motion Picture (Kim Kaphwan)
- My Neighbor Totoro (Tractor driver)

=== Video games ===
- Capcom vs. SNK 2: Mark of the Millennium 2001 (Haohmaru)
- Initial D Arcade Stage (Toru Suetsugu)
- Shadow Hearts: From The New World (Killer)
- Ace Combat 3: electrosphere (JPN version) (Keith Bryan)
- Mega Man Network Transmission (SwordMan)
- Samurai Shodown series
  - Samurai Shodown 64 (Haohmaru)
  - Samurai Shodown 64: Warriors Rage (Haohmaru)
  - Samurai Shodown: Warriors Rage (Haohmaru)
  - Samurai Shodown (2019 video game) (Haohmaru)
- Soulcalibur VI (Haohmaru)
- The King of Fighters series
  - The King of Fighters All Star (Haohmaru)
  - The King of Fighters XV (Haohmaru)
- Tales of series
  - Tales of Graces (Barry)
  - Tales of Graces f (Barry)
  - Tales of Xillia (Efreet)
  - Tales of Crestoria (Efreet)

=== Drama CDs ===
- Gohan wo Tabeyou series 3 and 6 (Yasuhiko Kuga)
- Gouka Kyakusen de Koi wa Hajimaru series 4

=== Tokusatsu ===
- B-Robo Kabutack (Kuwagiro)
- Kyuukyuu Sentai GoGo-V (Dark King Zylpheeza (eps. 2 - 22, 47 - 49))
- Kyuukyuu Sentai GoGoFive: Sudden Shock! A New Warrior (Dark King Zylpheeza)
- Ressha Sentai ToQger (Bucket Shadow (ep. 5))

=== Dubbing ===
==== Live-action ====
- The Alamo (William Barret Travis (Patrick Wilson))
- Coherence (Kevin (Maury Sterling))
- El tiempo entre costuras (Félix Aranda (Carlos Santos))
- Enter the Phoenix (Kin (Chapman To))
- From Vegas to Macau (Ngau-Ngau (Chapman To))
- The Hitchhiker's Guide to the Galaxy (Arthur Dent (Martin Freeman))
- Machine Gun Preacher (Donnie (Michael Shannon))
- Mighty Morphin Power Rangers (Jason Lee Scott (Austin St. John))
- Teenage Mutant Ninja Turtles III (Leonardo)
- Touching the Void (Richard Hawking)
- VR Troopers (JB Reese (Michael Bacon))

==== Animation ====
- Beast Machines (Tankor)
- Beast Wars (Rhinox)
- Biker Mice from Mars (Modo)
- Donkey Kong Country (Bluster Kong)
- Teenage Mutant Ninja Turtles (Leonardo)
- Teenage Mutant Ninja Turtles ('87 Leonardo)
- Thomas the Tank Engine and Friends (Rheneas (Season 9 onwards, succeeding Ryōtarō Okiayu) and Farmer McColl (Season 10 onwards, succeeding Yasuhiko Kawazu))
- Transformers Animated (Mixmaster)
