= Samurai Shodown Sen =

2008 video game

- Developers: K2 LLC; SNK Playmore
- Publishers: JP: Taito (Arcade); JP: SNK Playmore; NA: Xseed Games; EU: Rising Star Games
- Director: Mitsuo Kodama
- Designer: Masahito Inoue
- Programmer: Takahiro Inoue
- Artist: Senri Kita
- Writer: Katsuhiro Mitsuyasu
- Composer: NECOS
- Series: Samurai Shodown
- Platforms: Arcade; Xbox 360
- Release: Arcade: JP: April 17, 2008; Xbox 360: JP: December 10, 2009; NA: March 30, 2010; EU: April 16, 2010
- Genre: Versus fighting
- Mode: Up to 2 players simultaneously
- Arcade system: Taito Type X²

Samurai Shodown Sen (Note: Known in Japan as Samurai Spirits Sen (サムライスピリッツ閃, Samurai Supirittsu Sen; lit. Samurai Spirits Flash)) is the fourth 3D game in SNK Playmore's Samurai Shodown series of fighting games, and the seventh overall main title in the series. The arcade version was released in most countries as Samurai Shodown: Edge of Destiny, and Shi Hun: Mingyun zhi Ren (侍魂 -命運之刃-, lit. Samurai Spirits: Edge of Destiny) in China. The Xbox 360 version was released as Samurai Shodown Sen.

== Plot ==
The game takes place between the events of Samurai Shodown 64: Warriors Rage and Samurai Shodown: Warriors Rage.

=== Characters ===
The game features 24 playable characters, plus two boss characters made playable in the console release. New characters to the series are marked in bold.

- **Angelica**
- **Black Hawk**
- Charlotte Christine de Colde
- **Claude**
- **Draco** (Note: Boss character; playable in console version)
- Galford D. Weller
- **Garros**
- Genjuro Kibagami
- **Golba**
- Hanzo Hattori
- Haohmaru
- **J.**
- **Jinbei Sugamata**
- Jubei Yagyu
- Kazuki Kazama
- **Kim Hae-Ryeong**
- **Kirian**
- Kyoshiro Senryo
- Nakoruru
- Rimururu
- Sogetsu Kazama
- **Suzuhime**
- **Takechiyo**
- Ukyo Tachibana
- **Walter**
- Wan-Fu

== Development ==
Development of this game was announced publicly at All Nippon Amusement Machine Operator's Union (AOU). A tentative release date was set for the end of 2007. However, at the 2007 Tokyo Game Show, the date was pushed back, although it was suggested that it was almost ready for release in Japanese arcades.

After late October 2007, the game was subjected to rigorous beta testing around arcades in Japan.

On December 13, 2007, the official website to accompany the game was created, along with a bulletin of four locations sites: Tokyo, Kanagawa, Osaka, and Chiba. Testing began on December 20 and ended on December 24. The official website also confirmed an eventual release in 2008. The first overseas location testing took place in Hong Kong during December 20–21. Along with this announcement came the game's international title. Aoi Nanase, character designer to the series' first original video animation, reported in her personal blog that the official staff intended to make a great departure from the Makai and were aiming for a Sengoku period effect.

On February 9, 2008 the third location testing ad was listed on the Japanese official site at four locations. Testing began February 14 and ended on February 19, intended to be the final round of testing. Also at this time, a tentative release date was listed as "Spring 2008" (later than the previously stated release date) in Japanese arcades on the Hong Kong SNK Playmore site.

On March 3, 2008 an English location test was announced for the US. The test was a one-day event from noon until 6:00 on March 8. Director of SNK Neogeo USA Consumer's Marketing Department, Mark Rudolph, said eventual home release was anticipated to be made on current next gen consoles. Similar beta testing was also performed in Mexico on March 14.

The main artist for the Samurai Shodown 64 series and Samurai Shodown: Warriors Rage, Senri Kita, is the official illustrator for this game.

The American Xbox 360 release was originally set for November 2009 in North America.

== Reception ==
GameZone's Dakota Grabowski gave the game a 4.5 out of 10, opining that "after hours upon hours of competitive gameplay, Samurai Shodown: Sen didn't serve enough entertainment value to satisfy my tastes. It's a shame since the series has long been one of the most popular franchises among hardcore fighting fans."
