= Shanghai Mini =

1999 video game

- Developer: SNK
- Publisher: SNK
- Platform: Neo Geo Pocket Color
- Mode: Single player

Shanghai Mini was released in 1999 in Japan by SNK for the Neo Geo Pocket Color. Shanghai Mini was also released in the United States.

This game is a Mahjong/Taipei/Shanghai game for the system.
