= Puzzle Link 2 =

1999 video game

- North American box art
- Developer(s): Yumekobo
- Publisher(s): SNK
- Producer(s): Shuuji Takaoka
- Designer(s): Kenji Nakajima; Kyuta
- Programmer(s): Amo (Elen)
- Artist(s): Yumi Futagawa; Tsuyoshi Sugitani; Masanobu Yamagata; Raitaroh Huruki; Kamekichi Kameda; Fiy
- Composer(s): Paon Inc. Takafumi Wada
- Platform(s): Neo-Geo Pocket Color
- Release: JP: November 11, 1999; EU: March 24, 2000; NA: April 1, 2000
- Genre(s): Arcade, Puzzle
- Mode(s): Single-player, Multiplayer

Puzzle Link 2 (Japanese: つなげてポンッ！2 Hepburn: Tsunagete Pon! 2) is a 1999 Arcade-style puzzle video game for the Neo-Geo Pocket Color. Like 1998's Puzzle Link, to which it is the direct sequel, Puzzle Link 2 was developed by Yumekobo and published by SNK. The game was later re-released as part of Neo Geo Pocket Color Selection Vol. 2 in 2022.

== Gameplay ==
Just like its predecessor, Puzzle Link 2 is a tile-matching game in which the player must clear away blocks which occupy some of a 9x10 block grid. New to the sequel, there are three tile skins that the player can choose for the standard blocks (a default set styled like the symbols for the French suits in a deck of playing cards; the set of shapes used for the blocks in the first game; and a set resembling small rounded creatures with eyes).

Puzzle Link 2 once again features the Normal (now called 'Card Game'), Clear (now called 'All Clear'), and Battle modes from the original. Puzzle Link 2 also features two new modes: an Endless mode and a Card mode.

=== Card Game ===
While All Clear and Battle are functionally identical to their iterations from the original, the Card Game (i.e. Normal mode) campaign is structured somewhat differently.

Rather than a linear progression like in its predecessor, Puzzle Link 2's primary campaign features 50 rounds evenly split among five levels, any of which the player can access immediately, and a further 10 rounds in a final level that unlocks after beating the other five. This makes for a total of 60 rounds in Puzzle Link 2's entire campaign, compared to 46 in Puzzle Link's campaign. Also unlike the original, Puzzle Link 2 features minor thematic elements conveyed through short cutscenes—all centering around the protagonist (Ace) acquiring collectible cards from other characters. Further differences from the campaign of Puzzle Link include the addition of a gameplay tutorial and the removal of difficulty options.

Three visual differences from the original are visible here: the changed sidebar character, the changed card timer, and the new card-suit-themed block skins.

The gameplay screen features two noticeable visual differences from the original. First, rather than the sidebar character being the animal-like sidekick character Moomy as in the original, the sidebar sprite portrait now depicts the protagonist Ace. And second, the timer, which determines whether or not a player unlocks an in-game collectible card in a given round, has changed from a rounded hourglass into a horizontal bar with the letter 'c' next to it.

There is also an alteration to the primary gameplay and controls: the player can now manually advance the blocks down the screen in order to heighten the difficulty and pace of a level, and thereby increase the likelihood that they will acquire a card.

=== Endless ===
Endless mode features a continuous stream of randomized blocks with no level-ending 'c' blocks. This stream of play continues indefinitely and periodically speeds up until the player fails. The player can choose to play this mode with two, three, or four block types prior to beginning.

The sidebar of this mode features a charge meter for a power-up that is only featured in Endless. Once fully charged, the power-up allows the player to fire three shots which clear every visible block of the type hit by the shot.

=== Card ===
Puzzle Link 2 maintains the presence of in-game collectible cards from the first game, and adds this full mode built around using the cards in a minigame of their own. This minigame can be played against an AI opponent, or against another person. Playing against another person requires an additional Neo-Geo Pocket Color, an additional copy of the game, and a link cable—just like Battle mode.

The object of the minigame is to acquire six points, which are awarded based on a one-on-one competitive card selection game similar in some respects to the card game War.

First, the player antes up with one of their own collected cards, and the opposing entity bets a card of their own. Next, the two participants choose a class of cards from which to draw and play a card (10, J, Q, K, or A). Some classes are relatively weak but award high points upon winning a round (10 cards beat only A cards, but award five points upon doing so), whereas others are relatively strong but award low points upon winning a round (A cards beat K, Q, and J cards, but award only two points upon doing so). The choices are revealed and players are awarded points based on whose card won. If both players select the same class, then the card with the higher power statistic wins. Rounds continue until one player wins by being the first to accumulate six points in total. The victor then gets to keep the card bet by their opponent at the outset.

== Development ==
By releasing in November 1999, Puzzle Link 2 released in Japan within the same calendar year as the Neo-Geo Pocket Color version of Puzzle Link.

Puzzle Link 2's North American release in April 2000 preceded the North American discontinuation of the Neo-Geo Pocket Color by only two months.

== Reception ==
Puzzle Link 2 received favorable reviews upon release:

IGN gave the game a 9.0 out of 10, subtitled 'Amazing.' IGN's Craig Harris wrote the review and—despite noting its similarity to the original—concludes, "It's one of the NeoGeo's best puzzlers, and if you haven't picked up the original I highly recommend Puzzle Link 2."

Game Informer Magazine gave the game an 8 out of 10.

In 2023, Time Extension identified Puzzle Link 2 as one of the best games for the NGPC.
