= Kikou Seiki Unitron =

2000 video game

- Developer: Yumekobo
- Publisher: SNK
- Platform: Neo Geo Pocket Color
- Release: JP: January 20, 2000
- Genre: Role-playing game
- Modes: Single-player, multiplayer

Kikou Seiki Unitron (機甲世紀ユニトロン) (English: Armor Chronicles Unitron) is a role-playing video game developed by Yumekobo and published by SNK. It was released in 2000 for the Neo Geo Pocket Color handheld game console only in Japan. It is the sequel to Biomotor Unitron.

== Gameplay ==
The game takes place 400 years after Biomotor Unitron. Kikou Seiki Unitron plays similar to Biomotor Unitron, with top down dungeons and menu-based combat. The game requires the player to upgrade their Unitron robot with various weapons and accessories to compete against various enemies within the dungeon areas.

Using a link cable, two players can pit their unitrons against each other in a head-to-head battle.
