= Biomotor Unitron =

1999 video game

- North American cover art
- Developer: Yumekobo
- Publisher: SNK
- Director: Masaaki Umekawa
- Producer: Hajime H.
- Designer: Takahiro Oku
- Programmer: Masaru Miyashita
- Artist: Mayumi Takeuchi
- Writer: Kouya Sakugami
- Composer: Takuya Hanaoka
- Series: Unitron
- Platforms: Neo Geo Pocket Color, Nintendo Switch
- Release: Neo Geo Pocket Color: JP: April 15, 1999; NA: August, 1999; Nintendo Switch: WW: May 26, 2022
- Genre: Role-playing game
- Mode: Single-player

Biomotor Unitron (Note: Japanese: バイオモーター ユニトロン, Hepburn: Baiomōtā Yunitoron) is a role-playing video game developed by Yumekobo for the Neo Geo Pocket Color. Released in Japan and North America in 1999 by publisher SNK, making Biomotor Unitron the first role-playing game in the system, few weeks after the console's launch. A sequel, Kikou Seiki Unitron, was released in Japan; though, because of SNK's bankruptcy the title never saw a release in the United States or other regions.

A Nintendo Switch port was released on May 26, 2022. Followed by a re-release as part of Neo Geo Pocket Color Selection Vol. 2 the same year.

== Gameplay ==
Biomotor Unitron is a "dungeon crawler" RPG with pseudorandom dungeons. The player controls a robot called a Unitron, and walks through the dungeons fighting battles to earn money and experience. The experience boosts stats for the player character, and their "control" of the Unitron, but not the Unitron itself. There is rather a system of parts upgrades. The upgraded parts can be purchased, or "developed" using existing items, "tools", and "materials". The game has a fairly standard HP system. Instead of MP, there is EP, and EP is consumed with every action in battle. EP regenerates with every battle.

In the game, there are initially four dungeons and a town. Each of the four dungeons that are initially available has an elemental affinity, and seven floors. Each dungeon's layout, rather than being truly random, is selected from multiple pre-programmed layouts. The town is menu-driven, with access to "Works", where you equip parts, develop parts, and save data. There is also a shop, and there are multiple areas you can visit to talk to the townspeople. Some of the townspeople provide stat boosts, or will sell items to you. Finally, there is an arena in town, where you can fight other Unitrons for money, prizes, and many levels of advancing rank.

The game has two main goals. The first goal is to build your Unitron up as much as possible. The second is to clear the first four elemental affinity dungeons, and then clear the final dungeon.

== Reception ==
Reception

Review scores
Publication	Score
AllGame	3.5/5
GameSpot	8.5/10
IGN	7.0/10
RPGamer	7.0/10
Pocket Gamer	C+
Pocket Videogames	4/5

Biomotor Unitron received positive reception from critics since its release.

In 2014, HobbyConsolas's Álvaro Alonso identified Biomotor Unitron as one of the twenty best games for the Neo Geo Pocket Color. Likewise, Time Extension listed it as one of the best games for the NGPC.
