= Samurai Shodown! 2 =

1999 video game

- Developer: Saurus
- Publishers: SNK; Code Mystics (NS)
- Platforms: Neo Geo Pocket Color; Nintendo Switch
- Release: Neo Geo Pocket Color: NA: May 1999; JP: June 10, 1999; Nintendo Switch: JP: December 12, 2019; WW: February 25, 2020
- Genre: Fighting
- Modes: Single-player, multiplayer

Samurai Shodown! 2 (Note: Known in Japan as Samurai Spirits! 2 (サムライスピリッツ! 2, Samurai Supirittsu! Tsu)) is a handheld game in SNK's Samurai Shodown series of fighting games, released on the Neo-Geo Pocket Color in 1999. Unlike its predecessor, which was released for the monochrome Neo Geo Pocket, it features full color graphics. It was designed as a conversion from the most recent game in the Samurai Shodown series, Samurai Shodown 64: Warriors Rage, and almost all of its story events, endings and cutscenes are derived from its arcade cousin. Almost all of the characters from Samurai Shodown 64: Warriors Rage are included (the sole exception being Hanma Yagyu). It also re-added two series favorites who were not in the arcade release, Charlotte and Yagyu Jubei.

The game was ported to the Nintendo Switch, and was offered as a digital pre-order bonus for Samurai Shodown (2019). This version was later released as part of Neo Geo Pocket Color Selection Vol. 1 in 2021.

== Gameplay ==
Samurai Shodown! 2 retains most of the gameplay elements of its source game, albeit modified to work within a 2D setting.

The Slash and Bust modes for each character were retained, with all of the moves from the arcade kept intact (except for Yuga, who had a third form in the arcade, which was mostly excised). The original "CD combo", first introduced in Samurai Shodown IV, was also retained, but simplified and streamlined from its origins.

Being a game on a handheld platform, versus play was not a primary focus, so SNK added in a "Collection" mode, to extend the game's longevity. This came in the form of virtual cards, which could be traded with other people who owned the game, by linking up systems. There are eight per character (four for Slash, four for Bust). Each card contains a different piece of art, drawn in the game's cartoonish art style, and a bonus that can be equipped on characters. The bonuses come in four types:

- Power Up - Increases the damage done by the character's attacks.
- Defense Up - Decreases the damage taken when the character is hit.
- Special Move - Enables the player to do a special move which is not otherwise available.
- Power Up Special - Makes a particular existing special move do more damage, usually accompanied by additional animations.

=== Characters ===
Samurai Shodown! 2 features 16 playable characters; this includes the majority of the roster from Samurai Shodown!, with the exception of Shiro Tokisada Amakusa, Shizumaru Hisame, and Zankuro Minazuki. New characters are marked below in bold.

- **Asura**
- **Charlotte**
- Galford
- **Gandara** (Note: Non-playable boss character)
- Genjuro Kibagami
- Hattori Hanzo
- Haohmaru
- Jubei Yagyu
- Kazuki Kazama
- **Kuroko**
- Nakoruru
- Rimururu
- Shiki
- Sogetsu Kazama
- **Taizan Morosumi**
- Ukyo Tachibana
- **Yuga the Destroyer** (Note: Boss character; playable via cheat code)

== Plot ==
Since it follows the same story as Samurai Shodown 64: Warriors Rage, the setup is the same. In an unknown land an eerie disturbance disrupts the sky, leading a dark mass to the land. It is the ultimate evil-it is the reincarnation of Yuga the Destroyer. The objective of this being who once more alights to earth is the unification of this world and the Netherworld using the hermaphrodite male and female-that is, the construction of a utopia to become the foundation for the resurrection of the Dark God. As he resumes his search for the hermaphrodites, those turned into puppets by Yuga's magic unleash their carnage to gather the sacrifices necessary for the ritual of utopian construction. These puppets then employ various means to increase the dead and provide sacrifices. Some, for example, become leaders of the Shogunate to carry out ruthless policies, some became common murderers, and still others deliberately incite revolt against the government. Through the influence of the devilish reincarnation, outbreaks of famine and plagues further increase the dead, providing the evil with yet more strength and delight. The mountain of dead gathered by these means is subsequently heaped up on the altar of the Netherworld and fashioned into two pillars in which the hermaphroditic male and female are to be subsequently imprisoned. At this time one man returns to the Netherworld. The name of this warrior who stands directly before these literal pillars of the dead in the darkness is Asura. Master of magic, he is the dark swordsman appearing in this realm to wreak his revenge on Yuga. Regardless, his enemy steadily proceeds with the construction of his utopia. The curtain now rises on this drama of revenge that will engulf both our world and the land of the dead.

== Reception ==
=== Reviews ===
- Archaic.fr
- Pocket Magazine / Pockett Videogames
- Defunct Games
- Portable Review
- Video Chums
- The Video Game Critic
