= Puzzle Link =

1998 video game

- North American box art
- Developer: Yumekobo (Note: Production by Yumekobo; Sound by Warm Jets.)
- Publisher: SNK
- Producer: Akira Matsuoka
- Designers: Kenji Nakajima; Masahiro Sato
- Programmer: Amo (Elen)
- Artists: Yasuko Okada; Yumi Futagawa; Tsuyoshi Sugitani; Fumi Ishibashi
- Composers: Warm Jets Inc. Yuichiro Ohkawa
- Platforms: Neo Geo Pocket, Neo Geo Pocket Color
- Release: Neo Geo Pocket: JP: October 28, 1998; Neo Geo Pocket Color: JP: March 19, 1999; NA: September 30, 1999; EU: 1999
- Genre: Puzzle
- Modes: Single-player, multiplayer

Puzzle Link (Japanese: 連結パズル つなげてポンッ！ Hepburn: Renketsu Puzzle Tsunagete Pon!) is a puzzle video game for the Neo Geo Pocket and Neo Geo Pocket Color. It was developed by Yumekobo and published by SNK. It was first released as a black-and-white Japanese exclusive for the Neo Geo Pocket in 1998, and then later as a worldwide launch title for the Neo Geo Pocket Color in March 1999. A sequel, Puzzle Link 2, was released in Japan in November 1999.

== Gameplay ==
Puzzle Link is a tile-matching game in which the player must clear away blocks which occupy some of a 9x10 block grid. The player clears these blocks by linking together two or more discrete sections of each block type. This linking is accomplished by firing one-block-width units of pipe from a player-controlled launcher at the bottom of the screen, which the player can only move left or right.

The pipes have as many varieties as the number of block types in a given level, and the type of pipe being fired is determined by the first block hit by the first fired unit of a new pipe. An existing pipe can be canceled.

There are three modes:

=== Normal ===
In the main game mode of Puzzle Link, the field of play is vertically scrolling so that the blocks to be cleared descend down the screen, one row at a time. If any block or blocks pass the line near the bottom of the screen which separates the launcher from the field of play, the player fails the level. A warning sound will play when any block comes within two block-widths of the line, and the character in the sidebar will become visibly distressed.

The player is about to complete a red connection to clear an immediate total of six red blocks. All four normal blocks, the round-ending 'c' blocks, the sidebar distress animation, and the card hourglass timer are all also visible.

There will be between two and four varieties of standard blocks filling up any given level, not counting two unique blocks marked with the letter 'c'. In order to complete a level in the main game mode, the player must clear enough standard blocks to find the two unique 'c' blocks and link them together.

If the 'c' blocks are linked before an hourglass-shaped timer on the left side of the screen depletes, the player is awarded with an in-game collectible "char. card" featuring a fictional creature. These collectible cards can then be viewed via the option menu, but are otherwise without use.

Blocks left loose after a connection clears other nearby blocks will fall directly upward, and may clear additional blocks if they land adjacent to previously separate blocks of the same type.

Normal mode has three difficulties: easy, ave, and hard. Easy mode contains five slow-paced training levels (0–1 to 0–5), after which the player is expected to move up to ave mode—short for 'average mode'—in order to begin the campaign at level 1-1. Hard mode also starts at level 1-1, but the blocks descend down the screen at a higher rate than in easy or average mode.

There are 46 rounds in the normal mode campaign. This includes one easy-mode training level with five rounds, seven levels with five rounds each, and a final eighth level with six rounds.

Normal mode features an arcade-style scoreboard that tracks the highest number of points attained by a player in one sitting without a game over. These rankings can be viewed at any time from the option menu.

=== Clear ===
The clear mode of Puzzle Link features static block patterns which have to be one hundred percent cleared in order to complete each level. Unlike the normal mode—which has both the card bonus timer and the primary mechanic of time-sensitive clearing—clear mode features no time limit. A player can only fail a stage by exhausting all possible moves without fully clearing the playing grid. Points are awarded based on how few moves were required to clear the board.

Clear mode has two modes of its own: fixed and random. In fixed levels, each pattern of blocks to be cleared was arranged precisely by the developers, and features a suggested move count. In random levels, a nearly-full grid of random blocks (similar to what a player might encounter in normal mode levels) is generated for the player to clear, with no suggested move count provided.

Clear mode features an arcade-style in-game scoreboard, distinct from the one in normal mode, to keep track of the highest number of points accumulated by a player in one play session without a game over.

=== Battle ===
The battle mode is Puzzle Link's multiplayer mode. It can be played if two people in possession of the game and the console connect their systems via a link cable.

The mode features a one-on-one competition of the normal mode gameplay, with the participants racing each other to beat each level. Causing chain reactions of block clearance in battle mode sends rows of blocks to one's opponent. The first player to win three rounds is the victor.

== Development ==
Puzzle Link was first released in Japan only, as a black-and-white game for the Neo Geo Pocket on October 28, 1998. A version of the game was then made for the Neo Geo Pocket Color, which was made available the following year in Japan, the US, and Europe.

Puzzle Link's colorful variant was one of the Neo Geo Pocket Color's launch titles, coming out on March 19, 1999, in Japan, just three days after the release of the console.

== Reception ==
Puzzle Link received favorable reviews upon release:

IGN gave the game a 9.0 out of 10, subtitled 'Amazing.' IGN's Craig Harris wrote the review, saying, "Sure, it has the elements of games like Bust-a-Move and Tetris, but this is by far one of the most original takes on the genre I've seen so far. And it's a heckuva lot of fun to play, too".

GameSpot gave the game a 7.3 out of 10, subtitled 'Good.' Jeff Gerstmann wrote the review, saying, "Puzzle Link is one of the more unique puzzle games to come along in a long time, but it still delivers the same hectic puzzle game thrill".

== Legacy ==
A sequel to Puzzle Link was released in Japan toward the end of 1999; it was released in the US and Europe as Puzzle Link 2 the following year.
