= Sonic the Hedgehog Pocket Adventure =

1999 platform video game

- European cover art
- Developer: SNK
- Publishers: SNK; Sega
- Designer: Yukihiro Higashi
- Programmer: Yasuyuki Nakatsuka
- Composers: Takushi Hiyamuta; Maiko Iuchi
- Series: Sonic the Hedgehog
- Platform: Neo Geo Pocket Color
- Release: NA: December 4, 1999; EU: February 2000; JP: May 25, 2000
- Genre: Platform
- Modes: Single-player, multiplayer

Sonic the Hedgehog Pocket Adventure (Note: Japanese: ソニック・ザ・ヘッジホッグ ポケットアドベンチャー, Hepburn: Sonikku za Hejjihoggu Poketto Adobenchā) (also known as Sonic Pocket Adventure) is a platform game developed and published by SNK for the Neo Geo Pocket Color in 1999. The game is based on Sonic the Hedgehog 2 (1992) for the Sega Genesis, borrowing much of the stage themes and gameplay elements, but featuring unique stage layouts, elements from other Genesis Sonic the Hedgehog games, and extra game modes. Sega's Yuji Naka and the rest of Sonic Team supervised over production.

The game was released in December 1999 to positive reviews. Critics felt Sonic Pocket Adventure was a faithful adaptation of the traditional Sonic game formula, most importantly not making any sacrifices to the game's speed. Reviewers praised the game as one of the best among the Neo Geo Pocket Color's library and commended the quality of SNK's hardware. Several members of the SNK development team later formed Dimps which went on to develop several more Sonic games for handheld devices.

== Gameplay ==
Sonic in the game's first stage, Neo South Island Zone

Sonic the Hedgehog Pocket Adventure is a platform game in the style of the classic Sonic the Hedgehog games for the Sega Genesis. The game is heavily based on Sonic the Hedgehog 2 (1992) for the Genesis, while also using concepts from Sonic the Hedgehog (1991) and Sonic the Hedgehog 3 (1994). Sonic 2's stage themes are featured throughout, but the stage layouts are unique to the game. The bonus stages are also borrowed from Sonic 2. AllGame called the game "a slightly dumbed down port" of Sonic 2 and Official Dreamcast Magazine called it "essentially an adaptation of Sonic 2."

Unlike Sonic 2, Sonic Pocket Adventure features some exclusive modes. The game includes a save feature so the player can replay any level they have previously completed. There is also a time trial mode which ranks the player based on how quickly they finish each level. Another time trial mode requires the player to finish with 50 or more rings for the time to count, as well as stricter rank requirements. Sonic Pocket Adventure also supports two competitive two-player modes with the use of a Neo Geo Pocket link cable. One mode has the players racing each other to finish the stage first, while the other is a race to collect a target amount of rings. The second player controls Tails. There is also a puzzle mode where the player assembles portraits of Sonic characters using hidden puzzle pieces found within the levels. Completing the puzzles unlocks a sound test mode.

== Development and release ==
In August 1999, SNK announced that they were collaborating with Sega to develop a Sonic the Hedgehog game for their Neo Geo Pocket Color handheld system. The game was developed by SNK, with supervision from Yuji Naka and Sonic Team at Sega. This marked the first time Sega was directly involved in the development of a Sonic game for a non-Sega platform. (Note: The game was not the first time a Sonic game was released on a non-Sega platform, only the first time Sega was involved in its development. Tiger Electronics previously licensed Sonic Jam for the Game.com.) The team planned for Sonic Pocket Adventure to be a return to the classic 2D gameplay style found in the Sonic games on the Sega Genesis. In particular, many game design and visual elements are borrowed from Sonic 2. The game's background music tracks are also 8-bit renditions of music from Sonic 3 and Sonic & Knuckles. Sonic Pocket Adventure was released first in North America on December 4, 1999. SNK released a system bundle with the game included for the holiday season. The game was released in Europe in February 2000, and in Japan on May 25, 2000.

Several of the SNK staff members who developed Sonic Pocket Adventure went on to form Dimps in 2000—a new team funded by Sega, Sony, and Bandai. The new company went on to develop Sonic Advance (2001) for the Game Boy Advance and several more Sonic games for handheld systems in the following years.

== Reception ==
Reception

Review scores
Publication	Score
AllGame	4/5
Computer and Video Games	5/5
Electronic Gaming Monthly	8.5/10, 9/10, 7.5/10, 8/10
Game Informer	8.5/10
GameFan	97%
GameSpot	8.3/10
IGN	10/10
Official Dreamcast Magazine (US)	9/10
Gamers' Republic	B

Sonic the Hedgehog Pocket Adventure was positively received. Critics generally believed that despite being on a handheld system, the game successfully captured the same high speed thrills and sharp graphics as in the original Genesis games. The most common complaints were occasional frame rate slowdown and the lack of parallax scrolling, but most agreed these problems were not intrusive enough to detract from the otherwise high quality of the game. (Note: Attributed to multiple references:)

Some critics highlighted how well the system's hardware performed in their reviews. Official Dreamcast Magazine praised the joystick on the handheld as controlling better than the Genesis controllers. Daily Radar thanked SNK for developing a good enough screen to prevent any unwanted motion blur. IGN believed the game was a killer app for the Neo Geo Pocket Color, giving the game a 10, and that it filled the platform game role the system's library was so desperately missing. Official Dreamcast Magazine called it SNK's raison d'être for the Neo Geo Pocket Color. Andrew Reiner of Game Informer regarded the game as a classic, saying that it mimicked the Sega Genesis titles better than any of the Game Gear entries. AllGame disagreed that it was a killer app, but felt it showcased the system's processing prowess well. Chris Johnston of Electronic Gaming Monthly (EGM) praised the sense of speed and large levels, though he noted that lost rings go through walls, potentially making boss battles difficult. He was also slightly disappointed by the casino level, which he described as "a hodgepodge 'let's throw everything we can in here' level" that lacked enemies and was less enjoyable to play.

In retrospect, IGN called Sonic Pocket Adventure a system seller and a proving ground for the development team, as many members of the staff would go on to develop several more Sonic games for handheld systems as Dimps. IGN included Sonic Pocket Adventure on their wishlist of games for the Virtual Console on the Nintendo DSi. Although the Neo Geo Pocket Color was not commercially successful, Retro Gamer still called it a "fantastically playable" machine with Sonic Pocket Adventure being one of the best games in the system's library and the Sonic catalog. GamesRadar listed the game at number six among their list of top 25 Sonic games of all time. In 2023, Time Extension identified Sonic Pocket Adventure as the 17th best game for the NGPC.
