= Samurai Shodown: Warriors Rage =

1999 video game

- PlayStation cover art
- Developer: SNK
- Publisher: SNK
- Artist: Senri Kita
- Platforms: PlayStation, PlayStation Network
- Release: PlayStation: JP: December 22, 1999; NA: April 18, 2000; PlayStation Network: JP: April 25, 2007
- Genre: Fighting game
- Mode: Up to 2 players simultaneously

Samurai Shodown: Warriors Rage (Note: Known in Japan as ~Samurai Spirits Shinshō~ Kenkaku Ibunroku: Yomigaerishi Sōkō no Yaiba (～サムライスピリッツ新章～剣客異聞録 甦りし蒼紅の刃, ~Samurai Supirittsu Shinshō~ Kenkaku Ibunroku: Yomigaerishi Sōkō no Yaiba; lit. New Chapter of Samurai Spirits, Strange Tale of the Swordsman: Revival of the Blue and Red Blade)) is the seventh game in SNK's Samurai Shodown series of fighting games, and the third 3D game. It was designed for the original Sony PlayStation console.

== Gameplay ==
The game introduces a new life bar system, which is subdivided into three sections. Each time a player's life bar is depleted, one less section is restored at the start of the next round. The match ends when a player loses three rounds.

Though the game still features 3D graphics, movement is restricted to a 2D plane beyond a basic dodge. Two buttons control weak and strong slashes, a third performs a kick attack, and the fourth is used for dodges.

=== Characters ===
Warriors Rage features 23 characters, the vast majority of which are new to the series; the only returning playable characters are Haohmaru and Hanzo Hattori, though the Hanzo featured in this game is revealed to be the son of the original. Other returning characters such as Nakoruru and Rimururu appear only in a non-playable capacity. The new characters include the following:

- Seishiro Kuki – protagonist who has been ordered by the government to stop his brother, Tohma. Wields a blue katana.
- Jin-Emon Hanafusa – partner to Seishiro who has also been sent by the government to capture Jushiro. Wields a jumonji-yari.
- Jushiro Sakaki – the leader of the anti-government group "Atom Rebels". Wields a katana with a gun concealed in its hilt.
- Rinka Yoshino – a member of the "Atom Rebels" who wants to restore her family name. Wields a nodachi.
- Saya – the final member of the "Atom Rebels" who wants to avenge the death of her family. Wields a pair of sickles.
- Haito Kanakura – a freelance bodyguard from Ritenkyo who fights in order to gain his freedom. Wields an unsheathed swordstick in reverse grip.
- Yaci Izanagi – a man from Ritenkyo who fights to rescue his lover, Namino. Wields a saw blade.
- Garyo the Whirlwind – a bandit leader who wants revenge for his comrades and also wants the hand of Mikoto in marriage. Wields a short sword that remains concealed in its sheath to use as a club.
- Ran Po – a young orphan who is searching for his younger sister, Minto. Wields a giant hammer.
- Mikoto – the daughter of Asura who sides with Oboro. She fights because she wants to be her own woman. Wields a nagayari.
- Tohma Kuki – adopted brother to Seishiro who wants his brother's sword for more power. Wields an orange katana.
- Oboro – the final boss of the game. He is the leader of the "Three Blades of Domination". Wields either a blue sword or a red spear by magic.
- Tashon Mao – a Chinese warrior who "protects" Nakoruru from strangers. Wields a giant gauntlet with a talon.
- Daruma – a wandering veteran swordsman who wants to stop Oboro. Wields a cane with a sword concealed in it.
- Minto – a young girl who wants to find her friend, Mario. Wields a hammer shaped like a cat's paw.
- Mugenji – a serial murderer who wants to be reborn as a butterfly. Wields a spiked nata.
- Yuda – a fusion product of both Asuras who appeared in Samurai Shodown 64: Warriors Rage. Wields a red katana.
- Samurai – a common swordsman who longs to return to his home. Wields a suyari.
- Iga ninjas – loyal warriors under the command of Hanzo. Wield a ninjato.
- Oboro's amazons – servant maidens who fight for Oboro. Wield a pair of ninja swords.
- Brute – a rebellious grunt who cares only for money. Wields a katana called a dosu.

== Plot ==
Taking place 20 years after the events of the original games, Samurai Shodown: Warriors Rage has the player take the role of a warrior for hire who must stop an evil gang and rescue Rimururu.

== Release ==
SNK gave the game an extremely similar English title to that of its predecessor, Samurai Shodown 64: Warriors Rage. This generated considerable confusion, and led many to the assumption that it was a port of the second Hyper Neo Geo 64 game. It was also released in relatively limited numbers outside Japan, as the gaming market was gearing up for the release of the PlayStation 2. This meant that few people had actually seen either game, therefore the title was the factor they were aware of. Even a cursory comparison between the two games reveals that they are two very different entities. To help eliminate confusion, Samurai Shodown: Warriors Rage is now frequently referred to in English-speaking circles as Warriors Rage 2, or SSWR2 for short.

== Reception ==
Reception

Aggregate score
Aggregator	Score
GameRankings	42.40%

Review scores
Publication	Score
Electronic Gaming Monthly	2/10
GameSpot	3.7/10
IGN	6/10

The game received mixed to negative reception.
