= Hyper Neo Geo 64 =

Arcade system

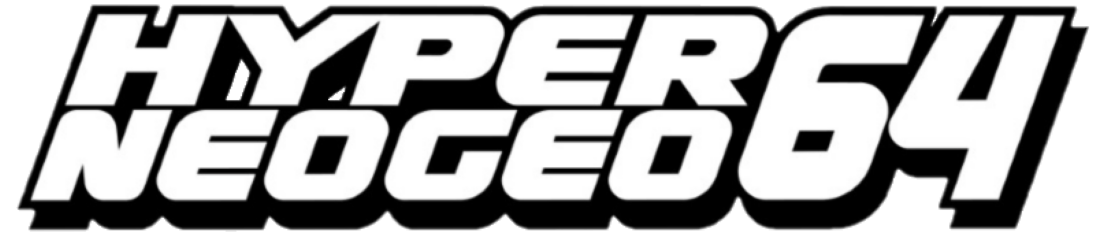

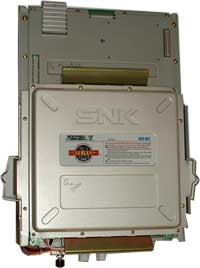
- Hyper Neo Geo 64 system board and software
- Manufacturer: SNK Corporation
- Product family: Neo Geo
- Type: Arcade system board
- Generation: Fifth
- Released: September 1997
- Lifespan: 1997–1999
- Discontinued: 1999
- Media: ROM cartridge
- CPU: NEC VR4300 @ 100 MHz
- Storage: Memory card
- Predecessor: Neo Geo MVS

The Hyper Neo Geo 64 is an arcade system board created by SNK and released in 1997. Planned as a successor of the popular Neo Geo, it never managed to match its success. Only seven games were produced, none of which proved particularly popular. It was the only SNK arcade board capable of 3D rendering, conceived to bring SNK into the 3D era that had arisen during the mid-1990s.

== History ==
The system was first announced in late 1995, and planned for release in late 1996. It was officially unveiled at the February 1997 AOU show, though all that was demonstrated at the show was a videotape containing a few seconds of footage of Samurai Shodown 64, which SNK announced would be the first game for the system. By mid-1997 test units were on display in Japan.

The system was released, only in arcade form, in September 1997, featuring a custom 64-bit RISC processor, 4 megabytes of program memory, 64 megabytes of 3D and texture memory, and 128 megabytes of memory for 2D characters and backgrounds. The first title released for the system was Road's Edge, with Samurai Shodown 64 following soon after. Neither was particularly well received. The system was a failure and by 1999 was discontinued, with only seven games released in total. SNK resumed releasing games on their older Neo Geo system.

A home console version was rumored to be in production, but was never confirmed by SNK.

== Specifications ==
- Processors:
  - CPU #1 (main): 100 MHz NEC VR4300 (64-bit MIPS III)
  - CPU #2 (auxiliary, handles audio I/O): NEC V53@16 MHz 16-bit microcontroller (V33 superset)
  - CPU #3 (auxiliary, handles communications I/O): KL5C80A12CFP@12.5 MHz 8-bit microcontroller (Z80 compatible)
- Memory layout:
  - 0x00000000..0x00FFFFFF: mainboard RAM (16 MiB)
  - 0x04000000..0x05FFFFFF: cartridge RAM (16 MiB)
  - 0x1FC00000..0x1FC7FFFF: ROM (512 KiB)
  - Cartridge ROM mapping is variable.
- Sound chip:
  - L7A1045 L6028 DSP-A: 32-channel PCM audio, with maximum sampling frequency of 44.1 kHz (CD-quality) and 32 MB of sample RAM
- Display:
  - Color palette: 16.7 million
  - Maximum onscreen color palette: 4,096
  - 3D branch: 96 MB vertex memory, 16 MB maximum texture memory
  - 2D sprite branch: 60 frames per second animation, 128 MB character memory
    - Main functions: scaling, montage, chain, mosaic, mesh, action, up/down, right/left reverse
    - Sprites per frame: 1,536 sprites
  - 2D scrolling branch: Up to 4 game planes, 64 MB character memory
    - Main functions: scaling, revolution, morphing; horizontal/vertical screen partitioning and line scrolling

== List of games ==
Title	Genre	Release date	Notes
Beast Busters: Second Nightmare	Rail Shooter	September 11, 1998	The only third-party game on the platform, developed by ADK
Buriki One	Fighting	May 21, 1999	
Fatal Fury: Wild Ambition	Fighting	January 28, 1999	Ported to Sony's PlayStation in 1999
Road's Edge	Racing	September 10, 1997	
Samurai Shodown 64	Fighting	December 19, 1997	
Samurai Shodown 64: Warriors Rage	Fighting	October 16, 1998	
Xtreme Rally	Racing	May 13, 1998	

== See also ==
- Aleck 64
