= Pocket Tennis Color =

1999 video game

- Developer(s): Yumekobo
- Publisher(s): SNK
- Platform(s): Neo-Geo Pocket Color
- Release: JP: March 19, 1999; NA: April 30, 1999; EU: October 1, 1999
- Genre(s): Tennis
- Mode(s): Single player, Multiplayer

Pocket Tennis Color is a game from the Pocket Sports series for the Neo-Geo Pocket as Pocket Tennis in 1998 and re-released on the Neo Geo Pocket Color handheld game system. It features eight main characters with two secret, unlockable tennis pros. The game was later re-released as part of Neo Geo Pocket Color Selection Vol. 2 in 2022.

== Reception ==
Reception

Review scores
Publication	Score
IGN	8/10
GameSpot	6/10

IGN gave the game a rating of 8.0/10. GameSpot thought it was an effective way to kill a bit of time. Hardcore Gamer thought that the mechanics of the game were so " basic, solid and simple" that they would always be appealing to players.

In 2023, Time Extension identified Pocket Tennis Color as one of the best games for the NGPC.
