= Samurai Shodown 64: Warriors Rage =

1998 video game

Samurai Shodown 64: Warrior's Rage
- Developer: SNK
- Publisher: SNK
- Designer: Galapagos Team
- Series: Samurai Shodown
- Platform: Arcade
- Release: October 16, 1998
- Genre: Fighting
- Mode: Up to 2 players simultaneously
- Arcade system: Hyper Neo Geo 64

Samurai Shodown 64: Warriors Rage (Note: Known in Japan as Samurai Spirits 2: Asura Zanmaden (SAMURAI SPIRITS 2 アスラ斬魔伝)) is a 3D fighting game produced by SNK for its Hyper Neo Geo 64 system. It is the follow-up to the original Samurai Shodown 64 on the same platform. A PlayStation game was released as part of the same series; despite using the Warriors Rage subtitle in America, it is a different game than 64: Warriors Rage. Samurai Shodown! 2 on the Neo Geo Pocket Color is a 2D adaptation of this game, and a sequel to Samurai Shodown! on the Neo Geo Pocket which was a monochrome adaptation of Samurai Shodown IV.

== Characters ==
All 11 of the base playable characters from 64 return in Warriors Rage, as do the boss characters Gandara and Yuga. The game also adds seven new characters: Asura, Taizan Morozumi, Karakuri Hanma, Enja Kazuki, Suija Sogetsu, and the variant characters Shadow Asura and Half-Shaded Shiki.

== Reception ==
In Japan, Game Machine listed Samurai Shodown 64: Warriors Rage on their November 15, 1998 issue as being the second most-successful arcade game of the month.
