= Samurai Shodown 64 =

1997 video game

- Developer: SNK
- Publisher: SNK
- Series: Samurai Shodown
- Platform: Arcade
- Release: December 19, 1997
- Genre: Fighting
- Modes: Single player, multiplayer
- Arcade system: Hyper Neo Geo 64

Samurai Shodown 64 (Note: Known in Japan as Samurai Spirits (SAMURAI SPIRITS ～侍魂～, Samurai Supirittsu)) is a 1997 fighting game produced by SNK for its Hyper Neo Geo 64 arcade system. It was SNK's first 3D fighting game. After having released four Samurai Shodown games on the Neo Geo, SNK announced that they would be producing a new arcade hardware platform, this one 64-bit and with extensive 3D capabilities. Although it was never ported to home consoles, it was followed by a second 3D installment titled Samurai Shodown 64: Warriors Rage.

== Plot ==
Twenty years ago a certain process was done over the years. Yuga would take out babies from their mother's wombs for a few days. She would put a certain spell on them and return them to the mother's womb. The baby would be born as if nothing happened. The child would show talent in different fields. These children were called "Shindou" or "Kidou". Twenty years later, the children would become adults who have a high status or are well known. Yuga would appear before these people and would show them a mysterious puppet show. This causes them to remember why they were born in this world and would follow orders given by Yuga.

== Gameplay ==
The player can move in any direction, and the stages are multi-tiered. It is possible to knock an opponent through a wall or floor into a different section of the same arena, or out of the fighting area entirely, thus resulting in a victory by "ring out."

Each character has a "stamina bar" which decreases with excessive movement and attacks, and replenishes while inactive. There is also a "POW meter", which, once it reaches maximum, gives the player unlimited stamina for a period of time, and the ability to execute a super move.

== Characters ==
Samurai Shodown 64 features 10 returning characters from previous games: Haohmaru, Nakoruru, Genjuro Kibagami, Rimururu, Ukyo Tachibana, Hanzo Hattori, Sogetsu Kazama, Kazuki Kazama, Galford D. Weller, and the hidden character Kuroko. The game also introduces two new playable characters:

- Yagyu Hanma, a muscular man with a metallic, gigantic arm.
- Shiki, a swordswoman proficient in fighting with dual katana. She would go on to appear in later SNK crossover games such as SNK vs. Capcom: SVC Chaos, SNK Gals' Fighters, and Neo Geo Battle Coliseum.

Each character's story features sub-boss battles against the monster Gandara and the living dolls Deku and Dekuina, culminating in a final battle against Yuga the Destroyer.

As in Samurai Shodown III, each character has "Slash" and "Bust" versions.

== Development ==
The game was officially unveiled at the February 1997 AOU show, with a videotape containing a few seconds of footage of Samurai Shodown 64 serving as the first public demonstration of the Neo Geo 64. An 85% complete version was shown at the September 1997 JAMMA show.

== Reception ==
In Japan, Game Machine listed Samurai Shodown 64 on their February 15, 1998 issue as being the second most-successful arcade game of the month.

Super GamePower gave it 3/5.
