= Samurai Shodown =

Video game series

- Samurai Shodown logo
- Genre: Fighting
- Developers: SNK; Yuki Enterprise (V, V Special); KOF Studio (2019)
- Publishers: SNK; Sega (VI in U.S.)
- Creator: Yasushi Adachi
- Composer: Yasuo Yamate (Tate Norio)
- Platform: List: Arcade, Neo Geo AES, Neo Geo CD, Neo Geo Pocket, Neo Geo Pocket Color, Neo Geo X, 3DO, FM Towns, Game Gear, Mega Drive/Genesis, Saturn, Sega CD, Dreamcast, Super NES, Game Boy, Nintendo Switch, Wii, Virtual Console, PlayStation, PlayStation 2, PlayStation 4, PlayStation Portable, PlayStation Network, Xbox, Xbox 360, Xbox One, Xbox Series X/S, Xbox Live Arcade, iOS, Android, Stadia, Windows
- First release: Samurai Shodown; July 7, 1993
- Latest release: Samurai Shodown Neo Geo Collection; June 11, 2020

Samurai Shodown, known in Japan as Samurai Spirits, (Note: Japanese: 侍魂 (Kanji) / サムライスピリッツ (Kana), Hepburn: Samurai Supirittsu) is a fighting game series by SNK. The series began in 1993 and is known for being one of the earliest in the genre with a primary focus on weapon-based combat.

== Plot ==
The stories in the series take place in 18th-century Japan, during the Sakoku or seclusion period of Japan (the first four games run across 1788 and 1789) with great artistic license so that foreign-born characters (including some from places that did not exist as such in 1788) and fictional monsters can also be part of the story. The plot of each game is quite different, but they circle a central group of characters and a region in Japan.

Samurai Shodown consequently portrays snippets of the Japanese culture and Japanese language internationally with little edits. For instance, unlike most fighting games made in Japan, the characters in the series (including the announcer) generally speak only in Japanese, with dialects ranging from archaic formalities and theatricalism to modern-day slang, something that has been preserved for overseas releases. Win quotes and other cut scenes provide subtitles in several languages, including but not limited to English, Portuguese, and German. Much of the music includes traditional Japanese instruments (predominantly the shakuhachi, shamisen, koto and taiko) and later enka. Several characters are loosely based on real figures from Japanese history.

== Development ==
There are two primary artists responsible for the character designs and illustrations. For the early games (Part 1 to 4), the characters are created and illustrated by Eiji Shiroi. His illustrations featured a distinctive, traditional Japanese calligraphy style. While he continues to design for a few of the later games, they are illustrated by another artist named Senri Kita until the fifth title.

The Samurai Shodown games are most famous for their "Rage" (怒) gauge, a meter that only increases as a player receives damage, and which when fully activated has numerous effects depending on game. Earlier games also have a referee in the background, officiating the match.

== Characters ==
Base character roster of Samurai Shodown (2019)

Over the course of years since the first game, the Samurai Shodown games (excluding spin-offs) have come to feature over 80 playable warriors. The most famous among them include Haohmaru and Nakoruru, who are both considered the series' flagship characters. Characters directly inspired from historical figures and keeping their names, like Hattori Hanzō and Yagyū Jūbei, are present as well.

== Games ==
Main series games in bold.

English title	Japanese title	Platforms	Release date
**Samurai Shodown**	Samurai Spirits (サムライスピリッツ)	Arcade, Neo Geo, Neo Geo CD, 3DO, FM Towns, Game Gear, Game Boy, Mega Drive/Genesis, Sega CD, Super NES, PlayStation, Virtual Console, PlayStation Network	July 7, 1993
**Samurai Shodown II**	Shin Samurai Spirits Haōmaru Jigokuhen (真サムライスピリッツ 覇王丸地獄変)	Arcade, Neo Geo, Neo Geo CD, Microsoft Windows, PlayStation, Virtual Console, Xbox Live Arcade, Neo Geo X, iOS, Android, PlayStation Network	October 28, 1994
**Samurai Shodown III: Blades of Blood**	Samurai Spirits Zankurō Musōken (サムライスピリッツ 斬紅郎無双剣)	Arcade, Neo Geo, Neo Geo CD, PlayStation, Sega Saturn, PlayStation Network, Virtual Console, Neo Geo X	November 15, 1995
**Samurai Shodown IV: Amakusa's Revenge**	Samurai Spirits Amakusa Kōrin (サムライスピリッツ 天草降臨)	Arcade, Neo Geo, Neo Geo CD, PlayStation, Sega Saturn, PlayStation Network, Virtual Console	October 2, 1996
Samurai Shodown RPG	Shinsetsu Samurai Spirits Bushidō Retsuden (真説サムライスピリッツ 武士道列伝)	Neo Geo CD, PlayStation, Sega Saturn	June 26, 1997
**Samurai Shodown 64**	Samurai Spirits (侍魂 ~SAMURAI SPIRITS~)	Arcade	December 19, 1997
**Samurai Shodown 64: Warriors Rage**	Samurai Spirits 2 Asura Zanmaden (SAMURAI SPIRITS 2 アスラ斬魔伝)	Arcade	October 16, 1998
Samurai Shodown!	Samurai Spirits! (サムライスピリッツ!)	Neo Geo Pocket	December 25, 1998
Samurai Shodown! 2	Samurai Spirits! 2 (サムライスピリッツ! 2)	Neo Geo Pocket Color	April 30, 1999
**Samurai Shodown: Warriors Rage**	Kenkaku Ibunroku Yomigaerishi Sōkō no Yaiba Samurai Spirits Shinshō (剣客異聞録 甦りし蒼紅の刃 サムライスピリッツ新章)	PlayStation, PlayStation Network	December 22, 1999
—N/a	Nakoruru ~Ano Hito kara no Okurimono~ (ナコルル～あのひとからのおくりもの～)	Microsoft Windows, Dreamcast	July 6, 2001
**Samurai Shodown V**	Samurai Spirits Zero (サムライスピリッツ零)	Arcade, Neo Geo, PlayStation 2, Xbox	October 10, 2003
**Samurai Shodown V Special**	Samurai Spirits Zero Special (サムライスピリッツ零SPECIAL)	Arcade, Neo Geo, Microsoft Windows, PlayStation Network, Nintendo Switch, Xbox One	April 22, 2004
Samurai Shodown Mobile	Samurai Spirits -Makai Rinne Ki- (サムライスピリッツ－魔界輪廻記－)	iMode Mobile	July 4, 2005
**Samurai Shodown VI**	Samurai Spirits Tenkaichi Kenkakuden (サムライスピリッツ 天下一剣客伝)	Arcade, PlayStation 2, PlayStation Network	September 14, 2005
Samurai Shodown Mobile II	Samurai Spirits ~Shimensoka~ (侍魂～四面楚歌～)	iMode Mobile	November 21, 2005
Samurai Shodown Mobile III	Samurai Spirits Tenka Musō Typing ~Makai Tenshō no Shō~ (侍魂天下無双タイピング～魔界転生の章～)	EZweb Mobile	January 12, 2006
**Samurai Shodown Sen**	Samurai Spirits Sen (サムライスピリッツ閃)	Arcade, Xbox 360	April 17, 2008
Samurai Shodown Anthology	Samurai Spirits Rokuban Shōbu (サムライスピリッツ 六番勝負)	PlayStation 2, PlayStation Portable, Wii	July 24, 2008
Samurai Shodown Slash	—N/a	iOS, Android	October 14, 2014
Samurai Shodown: The Legend of Samurai	Samurai Spirits: Oborozuki Densetsu (サムライスピリッツ：朧月伝説)	iOS, Android	December 3, 2018
**Samurai Shodown**	Samurai Spirits (サムライスピリッツ)	PlayStation 4, Xbox One, Nintendo Switch, Stadia, Microsoft Windows, Arcade, Xbox Series X/S	June 25, 2019
Samurai Shodown Neo Geo Collection	Samurai Spirits Neo Geo Collection (サムライスピリッツ ネオジオコレクション)	PlayStation 4, Xbox One, Nintendo Switch, Microsoft Windows	June 11, 2020

== Adaptations ==
A television special loosely based on the first game, internationally titled Samurai Shodown: The Motion Picture (SAMURAI SPIRITS 〜破天降魔の章〜, Samurai Spirits: Haten Gōma no Shō), aired in Japan in 1994. An English dub was produced by ADV Films, released on VHS in 1995 and on DVD in 2005. The plot is an altered retelling of the original Samurai Shodown, with such changes as switching Amakusa's gender from male to female and the inclusion of the “Seven Holy Warriors”, skilled warriors who were resurrected to specifically fight Ambrosia; the latter were never featured in any other Samurai Shodown story.

Several manga adaptations of Samurai Spirits were produced in Japan. One of them, titled Makai Bukei Jō Samurai Spirits (魔界武芸帖 サムライスピリッツ, Samurai Spirits: Scrolls of the Demonic Arts), written by Kyoichi Nanatsuki and illustrated by Yuki Miyoshi, was serialized in the Weekly Shonen Sunday in 1994. It was later adapted into English under the simplified titled Samurai Shodown by Viz Media in 1996, where it was serialized in the short-lived Game On! USA magazine and concluded in Animerica. The story is meant to be a prequel to Samurai Shodown II, establishing an original character, Yui Minbunosuke Shosetsu, as the main antagonist. Game characters Haohmaru, Nakoruru, Hanzo, Charlotte, and Genan remain the focal characters to the plot. They often interacted with several original characters in the story; the most prominent perhaps is the Koga kunoichi, Nagiri, who believed Haohmaru had killed her father during his travels and sought to avenge him.

The first OVA, the two-part Spirits 2: Asura Zanmaeden, serves as a preface to the events of Samurai Shodown 64: Warriors Rage. Character designs were done by Aoi Nanase, a longtime fan of SNK. Unlike most game-based anime, the voices were supplied by the same actors as in the game. It is relatively obscure, never having been released overseas, and the prospect of licensing is dim at best, as it offers no introduction to any of the characters, assuming (not unreasonably) that anyone watching it is likely to be familiar with the series and its cast already. The story mainly revolves on Nakoruru and her humanistic ideals: she believes that anyone with a heart has the right to live peacefully. Shiki, though apparently free from Yuga's influence, is recognized as a threat for the sorcerer's return and it was through Nakoruru's reasonings that previously saved her life from Haohmaru. Nakoruru finds her and then struggles to peacefully defend her from her pursuers, which include Haohmaru, Galford, and Asura. Though torn because of her morals and pacifistic nature, Nakoruru eventually agrees to draw her blade and fight for those who need protecting. Despite being wounded in his final skirmish with Nakoruru, Asura stabs Shiki and they both sink into a portal to the underworld. Making peace with her blood-thirsty alter ego, the Ainu priestess leaves Kamui Kotan, hoping to find news of Shiki's safety.

The second 30-minute OVA, Nakoruru ~Ano hito kara no okurimono~, centers around the Nakoruru ADV game (released only in Japan), again using Nakoruru as the main heroine. Character designs were done by Yasuomi Umetsu, who is best known for his work in Mezzo Forte and Kite. The events of the story are meant to take place during the time of peace between the first and second games of the series. The story introduces her childhood friends, Yamtamu and Manari, along with her younger sister, Rimururu, and the relentless enigma, Rera. Nakoruru, though glad that there is serenity, experiences several premonitions of devastation and is haunted by the thought of further bloodshed. The climax of the episode has Nakoruru protecting a deer from a rock slide, implied to be caused by evil entities. For undisclosed reasons, the OVA never released another episode and the story remains unfinished.

In 2006, Sabertooth Games released a Samurai Shodown V collectible card game set along with The King of Fighters 2006 for its Universal Fighting System (UFS) collectible card game. Featured character starter decks were also released for Haohmaru and Ukyo Tachibana. STG staff favorites from the Samurai Shodown side tend to favor towards characters Nakoruru and Hanzo Hattori.

A film adaptation written by Laeta Kalogridis is in development.

== See also ==
- The Last Blade
- Neo Geo Battle Coliseum
- SNK vs. Capcom
