= Neo Geo Pocket =

Line of handheld video game consoles

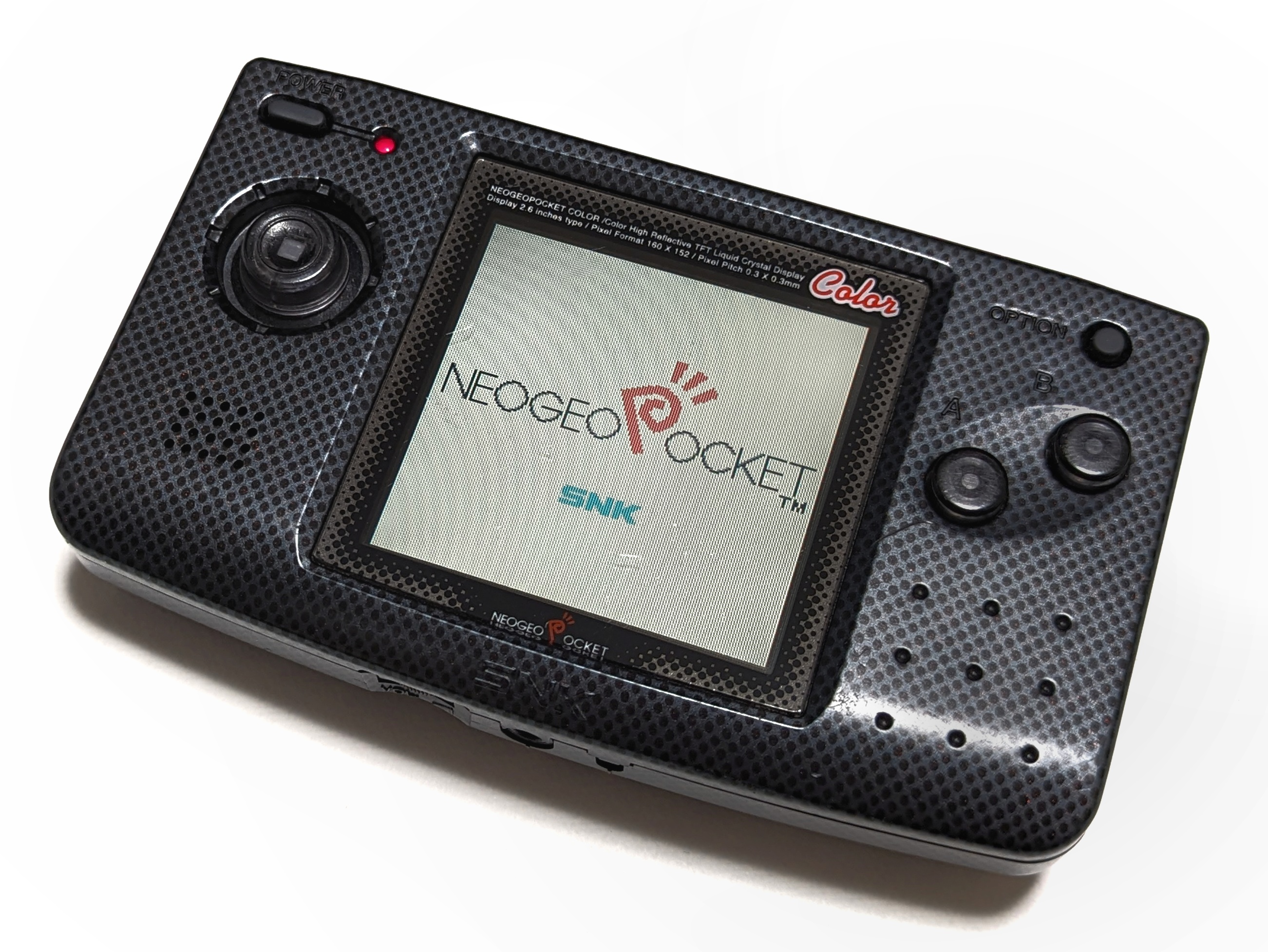
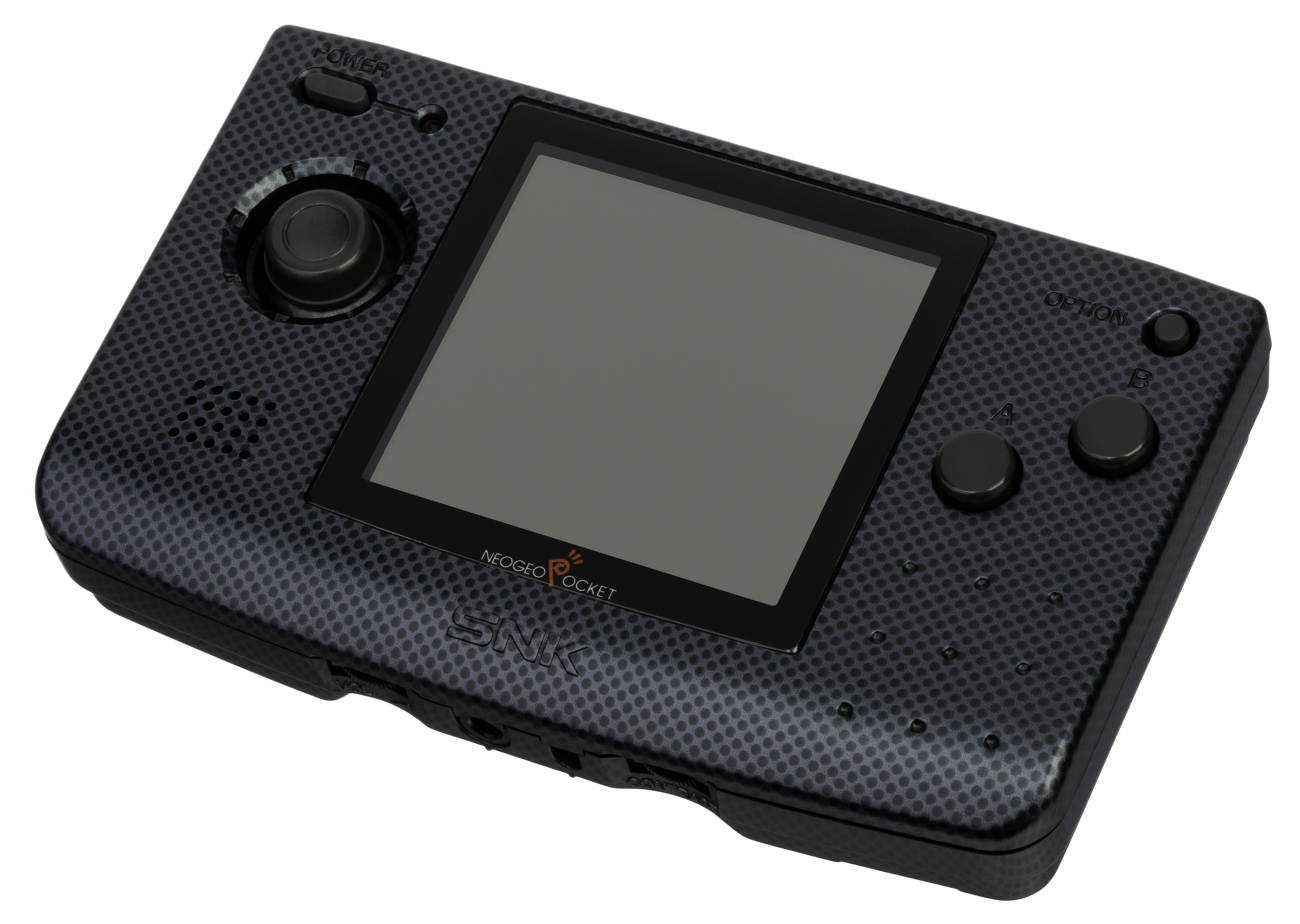
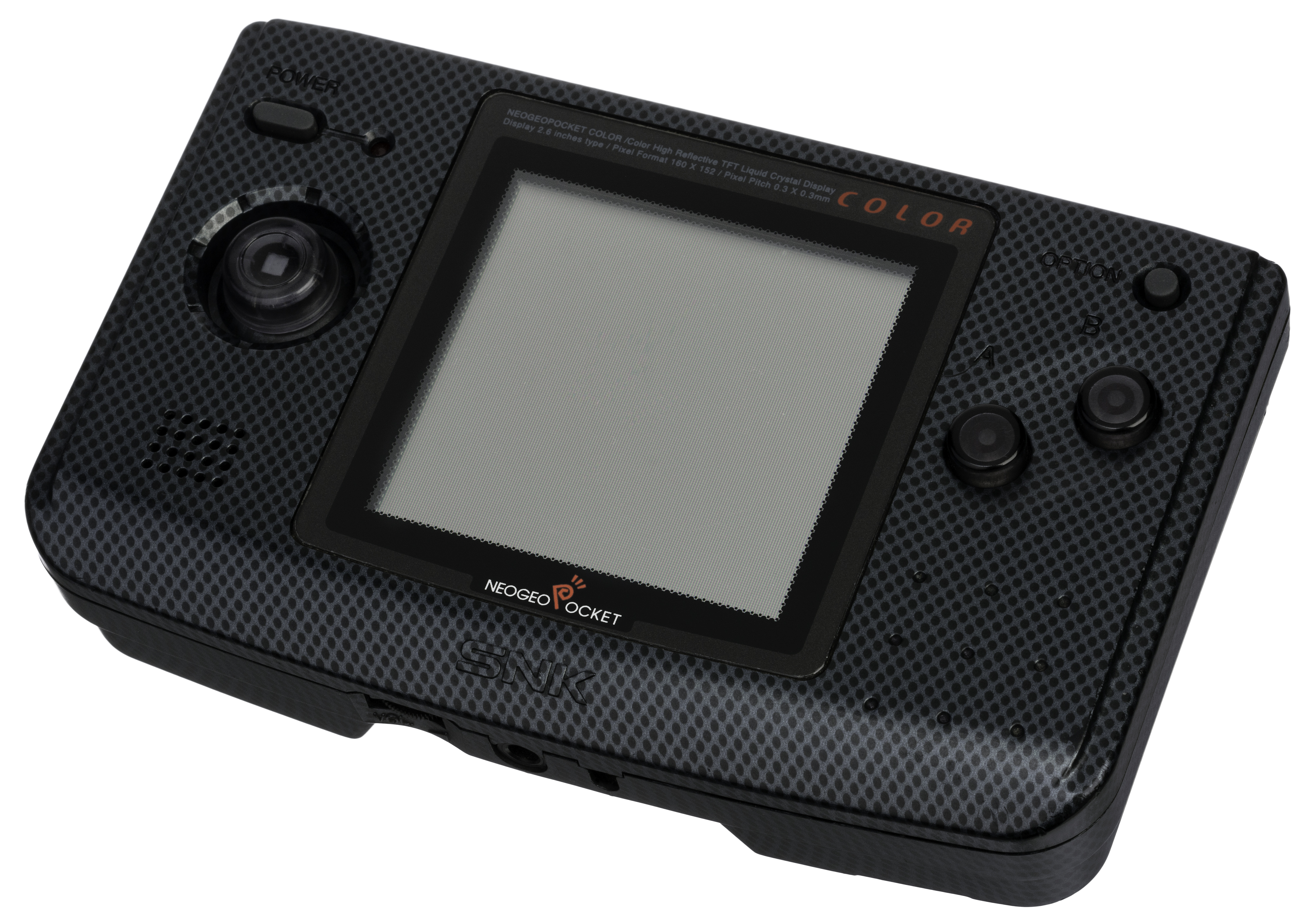
- : Top Left: Neo Geo Pocket; Top Right: Neo Geo Pocket Color; Bottom: New Neo Geo Pocket Color
- Manufacturer: SNK
- Product family: Neo Geo
- Type: Handheld game console
- Generation: Fifth
- Released: Neo Geo Pocket: JP: October 28, 1998; Neo Geo Pocket Color: JP: March 19, 1999; NA: August 6, 1999; EU: October 1, 1999; New Neo Geo Pocket Color: JP: October 21, 1999
- Introductory price: Neo Geo Pocket: ¥7,800; Neo Geo Pocket Color: ¥8,900 · US$69.95; New Neo Geo Pocket Color: ¥6,800
- Discontinued: NA/EU: June 13, 2000; JP: October 30, 2001
- Media: ROM cartridge
- CPU: Toshiba TLCS900H core (16-bit) @ 6.144 MHz; Zilog Z80 @ 3.072 MHz for sound
- Memory: 12 KB RAM for 900/H; 4 KB RAM for Z80; 64 KB ROM
- Display: 2.7", 160×152 resolution, 146 colors on screen out of a palette of 4,096
- Sound: T6W28 (enhanced SN76489), 6-bit DACs

The Neo Geo Pocket (Note: Japanese: ネオジオポケット) is a series of handheld game consoles developed and manufactured by Japanese video game company SNK between 1998 and 2001. The first model, the monochrome Neo Geo Pocket, was released in Japan in October 1998, marking SNK's entry into the handheld gaming market and competing with Nintendo's long-running Game Boy line. It was quickly superseded by the Neo Geo Pocket Color (Note: Japanese: ネオジオポケットカラー) in 1999, a more widely produced model featuring a color display and full backward compatibility with the games for the original model.

The Neo Geo Pocket Color launched in Japan in March 1999, followed by releases in North America in August and parts of Europe in October. It received generally positive reviews for its microswitched joystick and a library of games featuring SNK franchises such as The King of Fighters, Samurai Shodown, and SNK vs. Capcom. A smaller and lighter revision, the New Neo Geo Pocket Color, was released exclusively in Japan in October 1999, offering improved ergonomics and minor technical refinements.

Despite its positive reception, the Neo Geo Pocket line struggled commercially due to limited third-party support, low retail visibility, and strong competition from the Game Boy Color and WonderSwan. Following SNK’s acquisition by Aruze and the company’s bankruptcy in October 2001, the Neo Geo Pocket series was discontinued, marking the end of SNK's involvement in hardware manufacturing.

== History ==
=== Monochrome system ===
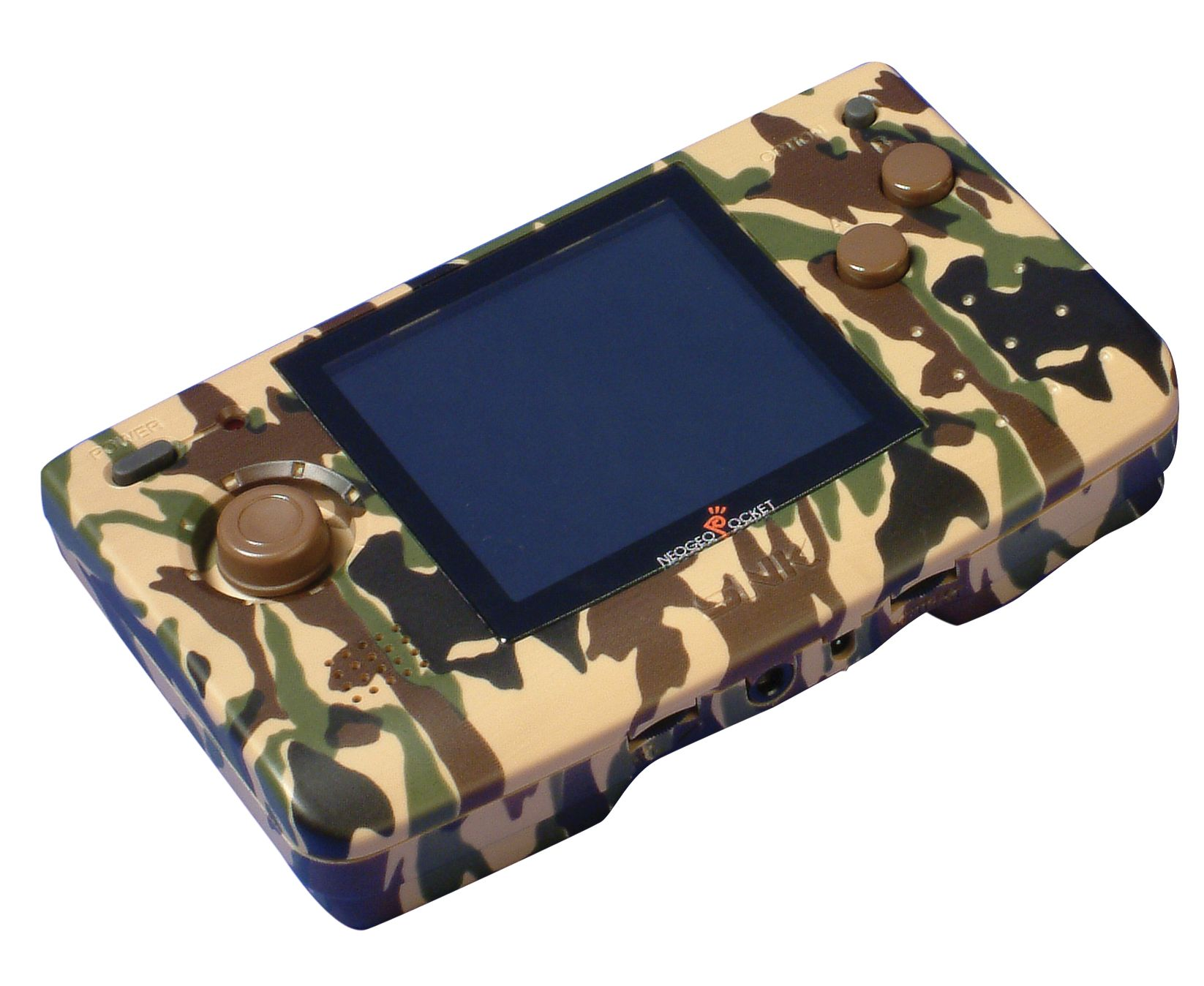
Neo Geo Pocket, in camouflage brown

SNK, known for its successful Neo Geo arcade and home console systems, entered the handheld gaming market for the first time with the release of the Neo Geo Pocket in 1998. The market had been dominated by Nintendo and its Game Boy, but SNK believed that the Pocket would target a "slightly different" audience.

The device featured a monochrome display and was primarily released in Japan and Hong Kong. It was sold along eight titles at launch, including Baseball Stars, a port of the 1989 game, and King of Fighters R-1.

SNK released the Neo Geo Pocket in various color variations, such as Platinum Blue, Platinum Silver, Platinum White, Carbon Black, Maple Blue, Camouflage Blue, Camouflage Brown, and Crystal White. The Neo Geo Pocket received the Good Design Award in 1998 from the Japan Institute of Design Promotion. The system experienced limited commercial success, leading SNK to discontinue it in favor of a color model.

=== Color model ===
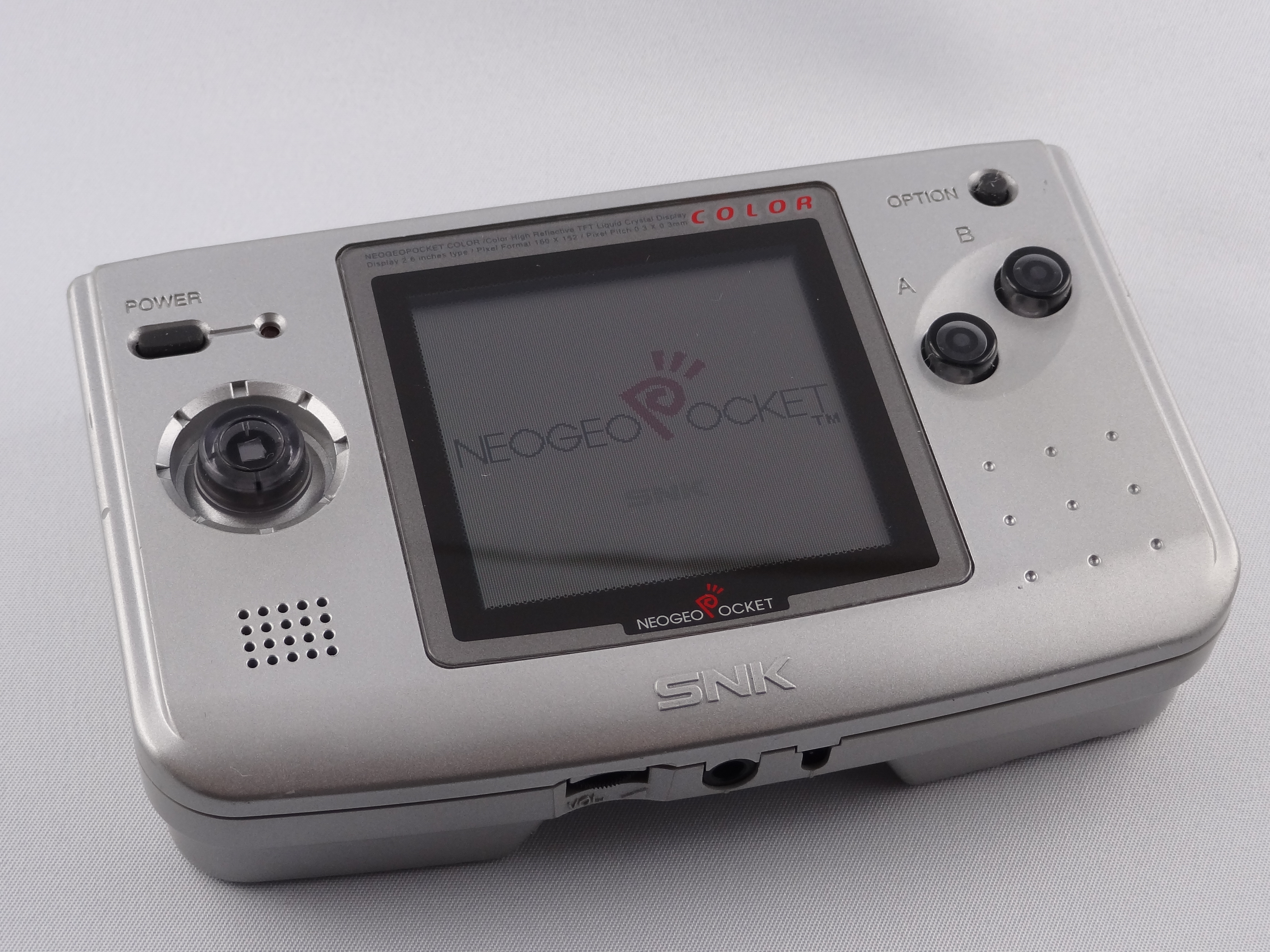
Neo Geo Pocket Color, in platinum silver

In response to the market's shift towards color displays, SNK announced the Neo Geo Pocket Color in January 1999. This upgraded handheld featured a non-backlit, full-color screen and was released in Japan in March 1999 with seven launch titles, including Puzzle Link and Samurai Shodown! 2. The Neo Geo Pocket Color was designed to compete with Nintendo's Game Boy Color and Bandai's WonderSwan.

=== American release and marketing ===
SNK never officially released the monochrome Neo Geo Pocket in North America or Europe, though customers in these regions could mail-order the system and its games through SNK's website beginning in April 1999. However, just two units were sold before the launch of the Neo Geo Pocket Color in the United States in August of 1999.

The Neo Geo Pocket Color debuted in the U.S. in August 1999, initially available exclusively through the online retailer eToys.com and carried an MSRP of $69.95. Console units came in six colorways: Anthracite, Blue, Clear, Ocean Blue, Platinum Silver, and Stone Blue. The system launched with six titles: Baseball Stars Color, King of Fighters R-2, Neo Geo Cup '98 Plus Color, Pocket Tennis Color, Puzzle Bobble Mini, and Samurai Shodown! 2 In its first two months, the Neo Geo Pocket Color sold 25,000 units. In the fall of 1999, distribution expanded to major retailers such as Wal-Mart, Best Buy, Toys "R" Us, and other national chains and followed with additional games: Biomotor Unitron, Crush Roller, Fatal Fury: First Contact, Gals' Fighters, Metal Slug: 1st Mission, and Neo Mystery Bonus. November saw the release of three more titles: SNK vs. Capcom: Card Fighters' Clash (Capcom and SNK Versions), and SNK vs. Capcom: The Match of the Millennium. In December of 1999 three Sonic The Hedgehog Pocket Adventure console bundles were released in Anthracite, Blue, and Platinum Silver.

SNK also spent $4 million on television ads airing on MTV, Comedy Central, Cartoon Network and Nickelodeon.

By May 2000, the system held a modest 2% share of the American handheld console market, tiny compared to Nintendo's dominant Game Boy and Game Boy Color, but enough to turn a profit for SNK USA.

=== Revision ===
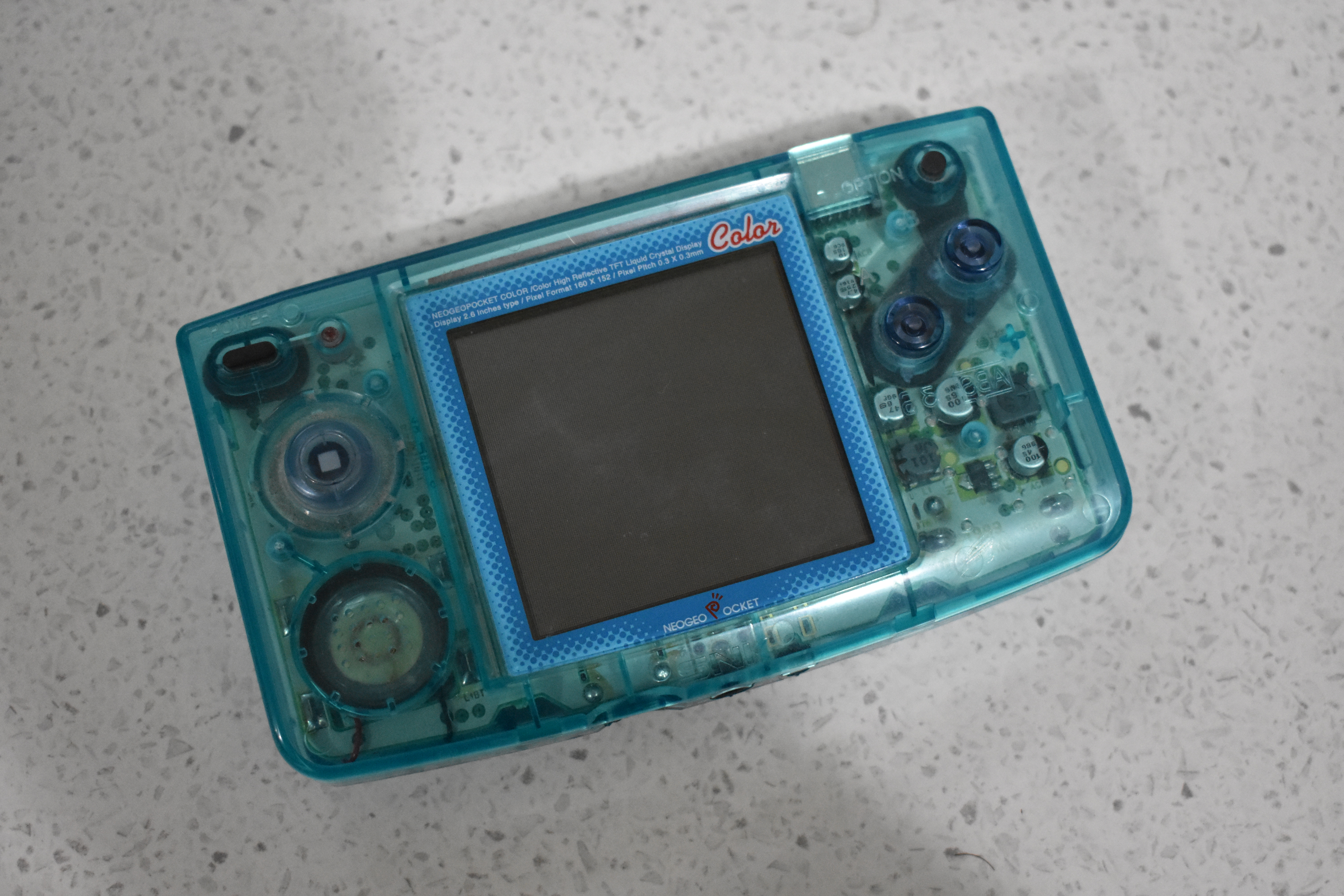
New Neo Geo Pocket Color, in translucent blue

On October 21, 1999, SNK released a redesigned, slimmer version of the handheld, known as the New Neo Geo Pocket Color, exclusively in Japan, selling at ¥6,800 (equivalent to ¥7,523 in 2024). This model was 13% smaller than the original and featured improved sound output.

=== Financial troubles ===
Despite a good start to sales in both the U.S. and Japan, the Neo Geo Pocket Color faced challenges. The console had low retail support in the U.S., limited third-party support due to a lack of communication with third-party developers by SNK's American management, and stiff competition from other handhelds, driven by the popularity of Nintendo's Pokémon franchise, and strong competition from Bandai's WonderSwan in Japan.

Meanwhile, SNK had been in financial trouble for at least a year, and in January 2000, the company was acquired by pachinko manufacturer Aruze. Conflicts with the new Aruze leadership led to the departure of SNK's founder and several employees, who formed a new company, BrezzaSoft. On June 13, 2000, Aruze ceased SNK's operations in North America and Europe. The handheld continued to be sold in Japan until SNK declared bankruptcy on October 30, 2001. After emerging from bankruptcy, the company did not pursue further development of handheld consoles.

== Features ==
The Neo Geo Pocket is a horizontally oriented handheld console, similar in form factor to the Sega's Game Gear, in contrast to Nintendo's vertically oriented Game Boy. The device features a finger groove on the back for improved grip, and game cartridges are inserted into a rear slot. Both models include two action buttons, along with "Power" and "Option" buttons. A notable feature is the microswitched thumb pad, which offers joystick-style eight-directional input and was generally regarded as more precise than conventional d-pads.

The original Neo Geo Pocket featured a monochrome liquid-crystal display capable of displaying eight shades of grey. It offered approximately 20 hours of battery life using two AA batteries, with a CR2032 battery used to retain saved data and maintain the internal real-time clock. The Neo Geo Pocket Color introduced a reflective color TFT screen and extended battery life to around 40 hours. Both systems include a stereo headphone jack and, like other non-backlit handhelds of the era—including the Game Boy line—require adequate external lighting for optimal visibility.

In addition to gaming functions, the Neo Geo Pocket and Pocket Color include basic PDA-style utilities such as a clock, calendar, and a horoscope generator.

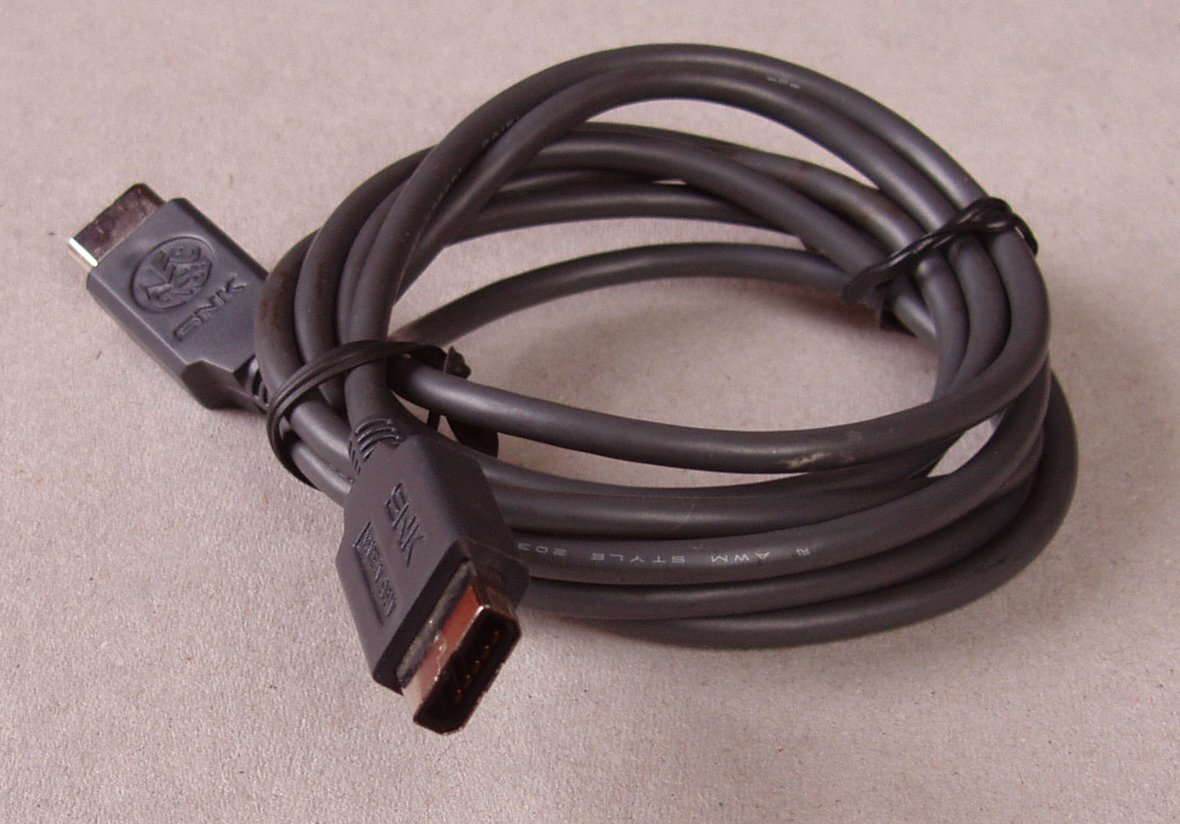
The link cable for linking systems together

Cables for linking multiple Neo Geo Pocket systems were available, as well as a cable to connect the Neo Geo Pocket Color and the Dreamcast, as part of a partnership between SNK and Sega. Supported Neo Geo Pocket Color games include King of Fighters R-2 (which links with The King of Fighters: Dream Match 1999 and The King of Fighters' 99: Evolution), SNK vs. Capcom: The Match of the Millennium (links with Capcom vs. SNK: Millennium Fight 2000), SNK vs. Capcom: Card Fighters' Clash (links with The King of Fighters' 99: Evolution), SNK vs. Capcom: Card Fighters 2 Expand Edition (links with Capcom vs. SNK: Millennium Fight 2000), and Cool Cool Jam (links with Cool Cool Toon).

At the September 1999 Tokyo Game Show, SNK unveiled a wireless adapter for Neo Geo Pocket Color units, designed to enable wireless communication between systems.

== Technical specifications ==
Model	Neo Geo Pocket	Neo Geo Pocket Color	New Neo Geo Pocket Color
CPUs	Toshiba TLCS-900/H core (16/32-bit CISC based on Z80) @ up to 6.144 MHz		
RAM	12 KB for 900/H, 4 KB for Z80 (shared with the 900/H), 4 KB of tilemap RAM, 8 KB of character RAM		
ROM	64 KB BIOS		
Interfaces	SIO 1 channel 19200 bit/s, 5-pin serial port		
Display	2.6-inch (diagonal) reflective monochrome liquid-crystal display (LCD)	2.6-inch reflective thin-film transistor (TFT) LCD	
Resolution	160 × 152		
DMA	4 channels, integrated in TLCS-900/H core		
Colors	8 shades of grey	146 (or 20 in monochrome mode) on-screen out of 4096	
Palettes	2 for sprites, 2 per scrolling plane	16 for sprites, 16 per scrolling plane, additional 8 sets of 8 colors each assigned to the 6 monochrome-mode palettes (2 for sprites, 2 per scrolling plane), backdrop, and window	
Characters	512 8 × 8 characters, transparency + 3 colors per character		
Sprites	64 8 × 8 sprites, each can be placed behind, in-between, or above the scrolling planes, no arbitrary scanline limitation		
Scrolling	2 scrolling planes, 32 × 32 tilemaps with 8 × 8 character tiles		
Special effects	Character flipping, sprite chaining, sprite coordinate offsetting, windowing, color inversion		
Sound	T6W28 (enhanced SN76489 with 3 square-wave tone generators + 1 noise generator, stereo capability), dual 6-bit digital-to-analog converters. Sound system controlled by a Z80 processor @ 3.072 MHz.		
Cartridges	Up to 4 MB ROM and 0.5–2 MB of RAM		
Batteries	2 × AAA batteries for 40 hours of gameplay, CR2032 battery for backup memory and clock	2 × AA batteries for 40 hours of gameplay, CR2032 battery for backup memory and clock	
Width	122 mm (4.8 in)	130 mm (5.1 in)	126 mm (5.0 in)
Height	74 mm (2.9 in)	80 mm (3.1 in)	74 mm (2.9 in)
Depth	24 mm (0.94 in)	30 mm (1.2 in)	30 mm (1.2 in)
Weight	130 g (4.6 oz)	145 g (5.1 oz)	120 g (4.2 oz) without battery

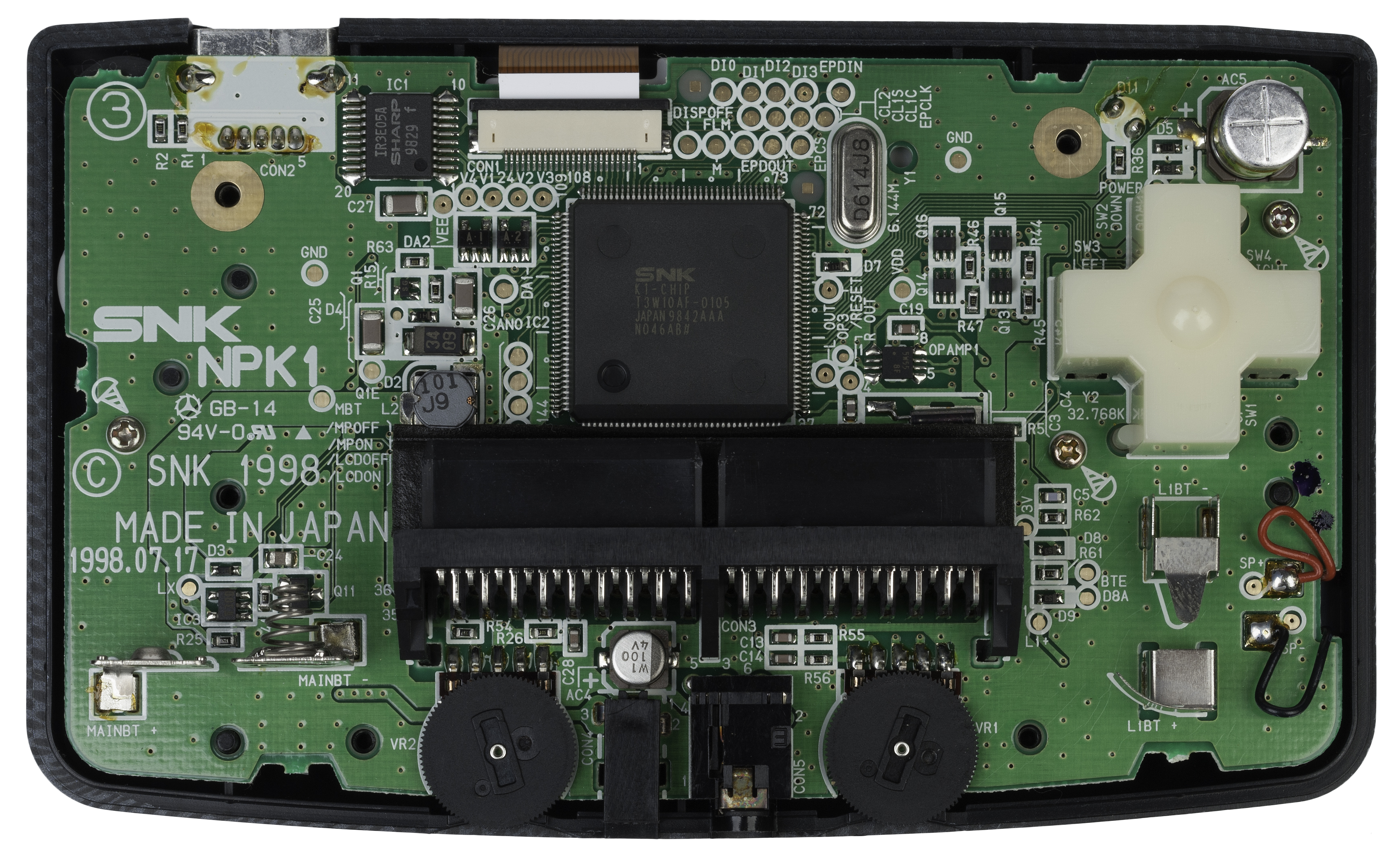
Neo Geo Pocket motherboard

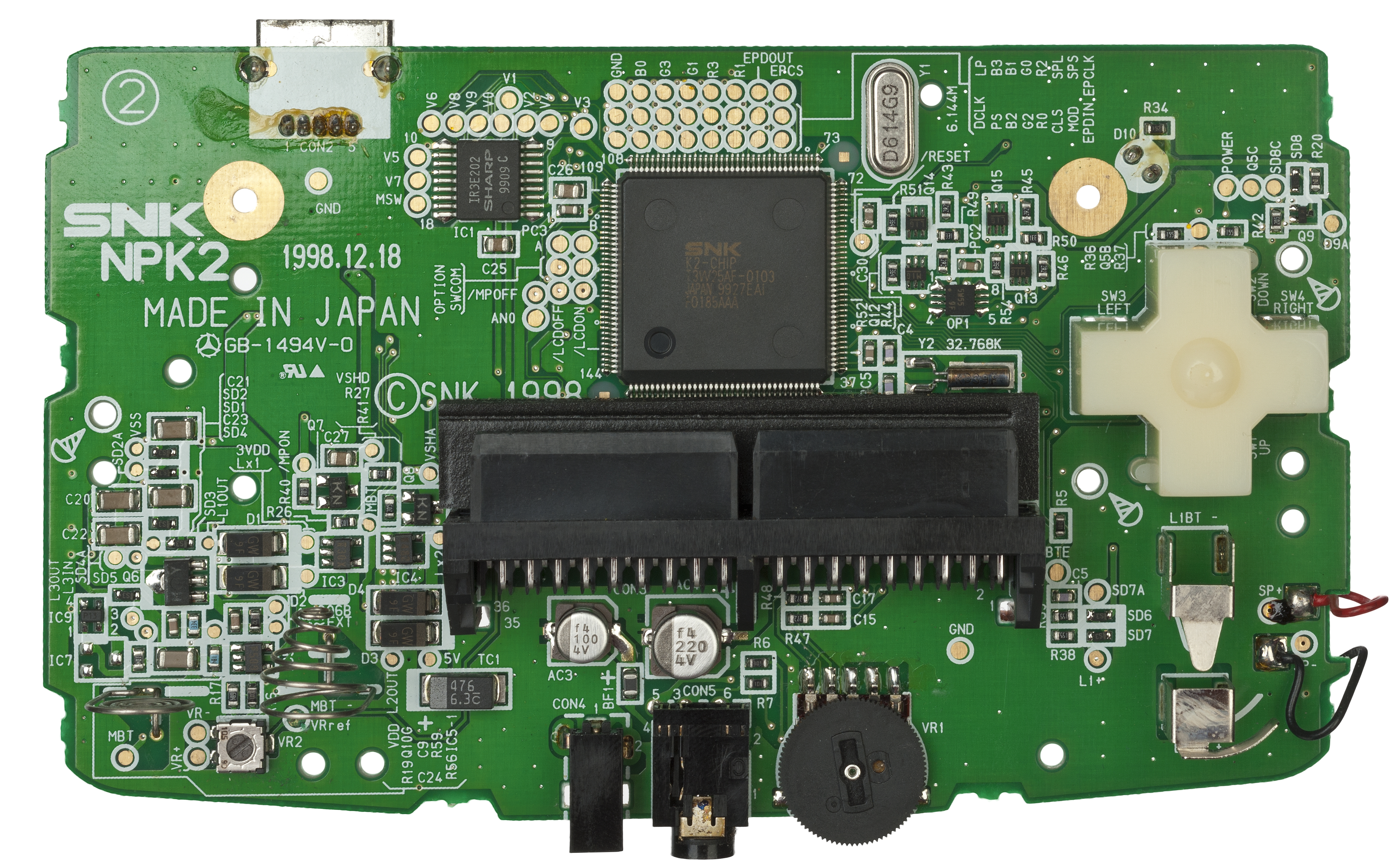
Neo Geo Pocket Color motherboard

== Game library ==
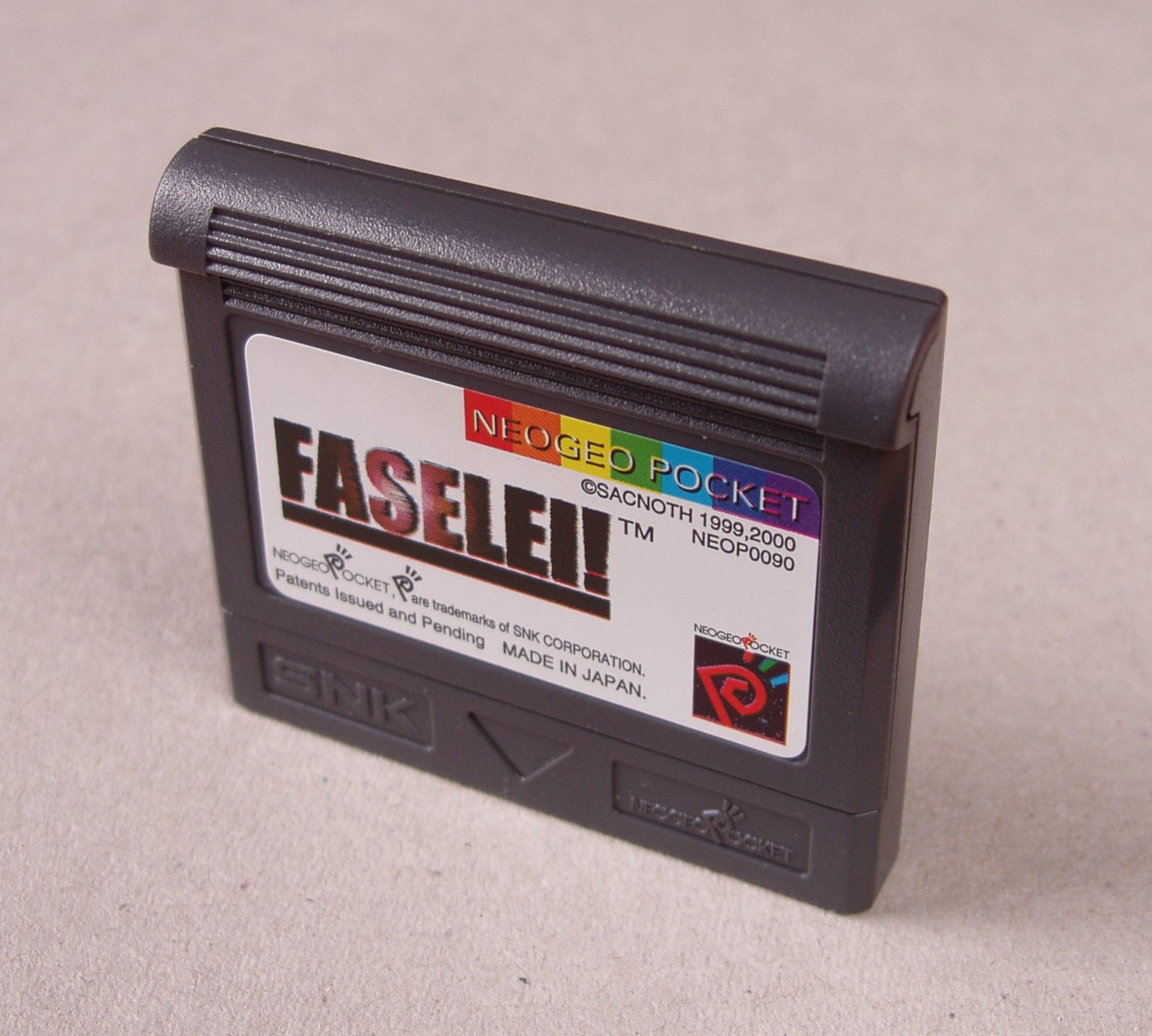
Neo Geo Pocket Color game cartridge

Only nine games were released for the original monochrome Neo Geo Pocket, all of which are backward compatible using the Neo Geo Pocket Color. Six of these nine games were later re-released in updated color versions for the Pocket Color. Some Pocket Color titles can also be played in monochrome on the original system.

A total of 73 games were released for the Neo Geo Pocket Color. Most were developed by SNK, including entries from its established franchises such as Fatal Fury, Metal Slug and The King of Fighters.

Some major third-party developers contributed to the library, including Sega with Sonic the Hedgehog Pocket Adventure, a title based on Sonic the Hedgehog 2 that has been cited as one of the best games produced for the system. Capcom collaborated with SNK on several crossover titles, including SNK vs. Capcom: Match of the Millennium and the SNK vs. Capcom: Card Fighters series. Namco published a version of Pac-Man that included a plastic cross ring designed to restrict the system's microswitched joystick to four directions; this version has been regarded as one of the best home ports of the game.

=== Cartridges ===
Neo Geo Pocket cartridges are smaller than Game Boy cartridges. Games were initially packaged in small, clamshell-style plastic cases with colorful cover art, resembling the packaging of Neo Geo AES games. These cases were regarded by some fans as particularly distinctive. In an effort to reduce costs, SNK USA adopted cardboard packaging for the North American market, a decision that reportedly angered SNK's leadership in Japan. Japanese releases later shifted to cardboard boxes as well, while European titles continued to be sold in clamshell cases until the system was discontinued in that region. Toward the end of the system's lifespan in North America, games were frequently bundled in blister packs to clear remaining inventory, sometimes including previously unreleased titles such as Faselei!.

=== Re-releases ===
Several Neo Geo Pocket Color games were re-released via emulation on the Nintendo Switch, beginning with Samurai Shodown! 2 as a pre-order incentive for the 2019 Samurai Shodown reboot. These re-releases were later compiled into Neo Geo Pocket Color Selection Vol. 1 (2021) and Vol. 2 (2022), which were also released for Windows.

== Reception ==
SNK sold over 25,000 Neo Geo Pocket Color units in Japan and more than 100,000 in Europe by the end of 1999. By May 2000, the system held a 2% share of the North American handheld market.

Retrospective reviews of the Neo Geo Pocket have been largely positive.

Jeremy Parish of USGamer called it an influential handheld, describing it as a "technological bridge" between the 8-bit portable era and the Game Boy Advance, commended its robust build quality, and noting that its distinctive "clicky stick" was a precursor to features in later consoles. He praised the system's diverse library, highlighting titles like SNK vs. Capcom: Card Fighters' Clash, Sonic Pocket Adventure, Magical Drop, and Pac-Man. Parish attributed its commercial failure to SNK's limited retail presence and the acquisition by Aruze in 2000, concluding, "Neo Geo Pocket Color's life may have been painfully brief, but it was nevertheless memorable for those who experienced it."

Ryan Lambie of Den of Geek called the Neo Geo Pocket one of Nintendo's strongest competitors, praising its "brilliant" game library, design, and quality. He lamented its early market exit, writing, "It was a premature end for a system that, although doomed to remain a distant second to the Game Boy, could have forged a great little niche of its own."

Damien McFerran of Nintendo Life called the Neo Geo Pocket, alongside the WonderSwan, one of the most "interesting challengers" to Nintendo. He praised its library, clamshell packaging, hardware, and battery life, writing, "The Neo Geo Pocket Color may not have succeeded in its goal of wrestling market share away from Nintendo, but that doesn't automatically mean it was a failure. Many fans will argue that the quality of the software available was far in advance of that on the Game Boy Color, and the fantastic controls, amazing battery life, cool PDA features and excellent screen combine to make a system which is still hard to put down, even today."

== See also ==
- List of Neo Geo Pocket games
