= Yamashita =

Yamashita (written: 山下 lit. "under the mountain") is the 29th most common Japanese surname. Notable people with the surname include:

- Akihiko Yamashita (born 1966), Japanese animator
- Ayaka Yamashita (disambiguation), multiple people
- Bruce Yamashita, U.S. military lawyer
- Emiko Yamashita (山下 恵美子; born 1953), Japanese handball player
- Yamashita Gentarō (Gentarō Yamashita) (1863–1931), Japanese admiral
- Gota Yamashita (born 1989), Japanese mixed martial artist
- Haruhiro Yamashita (born 1938), Japanese gymnast
- Haruka Yamashita (山下 晴加; born 1995), Japanese model and beauty pageant winner
- Hikaru Yamashita (山下 光; born 2000), Japanese ice hockey player
- Hiroko Yamashita (disambiguation), multiple people
- Iris Yamashita, U.S. screenwriter
- Jun Yamashita (山下 潤; born 1997), Japanese sprinter
- Karen Tei Yamashita (born 1951), Japanese-American writer
- Kazuhito Yamashita (1961–2026), Japanese classical guitarist
- Keigo Yamashita (born 1978), Japanese Go player
- Kinuyo Yamashita, Japanese composer
- Kumi Yamashita (born 1968), artist
- Kyle Yamashita (born 1959), American politician
- Maki Yamashita (born 1974), Japanese pop musician
- Mayuko Yamashita (山下 真由子), Japanese mathematician
- Michinori Yamashita (born 1953), Japanese mathematician
- Miyu Yamashita (山下 実優; born 1995), Japanese professional wrestler
- Miyuki Yamashita (山下 美幸; born 1971), Japanese rower
- Mizuki Yamashita (born 1999), Japanese idol and actress
- Norifumi Yamashita (born 1962), Japanese triple jumper
- Reiko Yamashita (born 1973), Japanese pop musician
- Yamashita Rin (山下 りん; 1857–1939), Japanese painter
- Rina Yamashita (山下 リナ; born 1989), Japanese professional wrestler
- Ryoji Yamashita (山下 諒時; born 2000), Japanese footballer
- Sachiko Yamashita (born 1964), Japanese long-distance runner
- Sachio Yamashita (1933–2009), Japanese-American artist, abstract painter and muralist
- Sadako Yamashita (山下 貞子; born 1932), Japanese swimmer
- Shiori Yamashita (山下 栞; born 2002), Japanese ice hockey player
- Yamashita Shintaro (山下新太郎, 1881–1966), Japanese painter
- Stomu Yamashta or Yamashita Tsutomu (born 1947), Japanese percussionist, keyboardist and composer
- Tadashi Yamashita (born 1942), Japanese-born American martial artist
- Takuji Yamashita (1874–1959), Japanese-American civil rights pioneer
- Tatsuro Yamashita (born 1953), Japanese musician and record producer
- Tokuo Yamashita (1919–2014), Japanese politician
- Tomohisa Yamashita (born 1985), Japanese pop musician
- Tomoya Yamashita (山下 友也; born 1946), Japanese sport shooter
- Tomoyuki Yamashita (1885–1946), Japanese general
- Toru Yamashita (born 1988), Japanese guitarist
- Yasuhiro Yamashita (born 1957), Japanese judoka
- Yoshiteru Yamashita (born 1977), Japanese footballer
- Yamashita Yoshitsugu (1865–1935), Japanese Judo exponent
- Yosuke Yamashita (born 1942), Japanese jazz musician

== Fictional characters ==
- Mari Yamashita
- Majime Yamashita

== See also ==
- Yamashita Cave Man, human fossils found in Okinawa
- Yamashita Station (disambiguation), several Japanese train stations
- Yamashita's gold, a World War II treasure trove
- The Yamashita Standard, a threshold for command responsibility in war crimes proceedings
