= Days of Memories =

Japanese video game series

Days of Memories logo

Days of Memories is a series of dating sims from SNK for cell phones, beginning in 2005. SNK released a compilation of the first three games for the Nintendo DS in 2007, with new graphics and an extra viewing mode.

== Summary ==
The games are dating sims starring SNK and ADK characters that take place in a parallel world to their own. In each game, the player is given the month of July to start a relationship with one of the girls featured in the game, in order to finish the game with the beginnings of a workable relationship.

== Games ==
- Days of Memories ~Boku to Kanojo no Atsui Natsu~ (Days of Memories 〜僕と彼女の熱い夏〜)

The game was originally released on October 17, 2005. On April 16, 2006, it was announced that the game would be ported to the Nintendo DS, and the game was released on June 14, 2007.
The cast of this game is considered to be fan favorites from their respective debut games.
Features - Athena Asamiya, Kasumi Todoh, B. Jenet, King, Mai Shiranui, Yuri Sakazaki, Leona Heidern, Kula Diamond.
Male characters - Kyoya Kaido (original)

- Days of Memories 2 ~Boku no Ichiban Taisetsu na Kimi e~ (Days of Memories 2 〜僕の一番大切な君へ〜)

Released on February 1, 2006.
Debuted the first unique Days Of Memories character.
Features - Hotaru Futaba, Kisarah Westfield, Fiolina "Fio" Germi, Chizuru Kagura, Mature, Blue Mary.
Male characters - Kyo Kusanagi, Iori Yagami
Exclusive character - Shizuku Misawa.

- Days of Memories ~Ōedo Ren'ai Emaki~ (Days of Memories 〜大江戸恋愛絵巻〜)

Released on May 15, 2006.
Is set during the era of Feudal Japan.
It is the first game in the series to show where the girls are.
Features - Nakoruru, Mina Majikina, Rinka Yoshino, Saya, Mikoto, Shiki, Iroha.
Male characters - Haohmaru, Genjuro Kibagami, Ukyo Tachibana, Kyouemon (original)
Exclusive characters - Shino, Chiyo.
This game features only Samurai Shodown characters, rather than the normal cast of The King of Fighters characters.

- Days of Memories ~Kare to Watashi no Atsui Natsu~ (Days of Memories 〜彼と私の熱い夏〜)

Released on November 1, 2006.
This game is marketed as a dating game for girls, rather than the normal male perspective.
Features - Kyo Kusanagi, Iori Yagami, K', Ash Crimson, Terry Bogard, Rock Howard, Alba Meira, Ryo Sakazaki.

- Days of Memories ~Koi wa Good Job!~ (Days of Memories 〜恋はグッジョブ!〜)

Released on April 3, 2007.
This game focuses on characters at work in various jobs, related to their normal game appearances.
Features - Kisarah Westfield, King, Kasumi Todoh, Mai Shiranui, Ai, Athena Asamiya.
Male characters - Geese Howard, Wolfgang Krauser, Konoe Hideki (original)
Exclusive character - Karen Ōkain.
All characters except Ai and Karen appeared first in the original two games.

- Days of Memories

Released on June 14, 2007.
Compilation of the first three Days of Memories games for the Nintendo DS.

- Days of Memories ~Junpaku no Tenshitachi~ (Days of Memories 〜純白の天使たち〜)

Released on June 19, 2007.
The character roster is taken from The King of Fighters XI and KOF: Maximum Impact 2
Features - Ninon Beart, Elisabeth Blanctorche, Luise Meyrink, Momoko, Malin, Vanessa, Kaoru Watabe (Athena Asamiya's fan and friend), Alice Garnet Nakata (from the Fatal Fury slot machine, Alice would later appear in The King of Fighters XIV).
Side characters - Mignon Beart
Male characters - Magaki, Shion
Exclusive characters - Ayame Ichitsuka, Tsugumi Ichitsuka.

- Days of Memories 2

Released on April 24, 2008.
Compilation of the fourth to sixth Days of Memories games for the Nintendo DS.

- Days of Memories ~Boku to Kanojo to Koto no Koi~ (Days of Memories 〜僕と彼女と古都の恋〜)

Released on May 5, 2008.
This game focuses on characters at work in various jobs, related to their normal game appearances. This is the first game in the series to include characters from The Last Blade series.
Features - Athena Asamiya, Leona Heidern, Kula Diamond, Angel, Whip
Side characters - Rimururu, Tsunami (from the exclusive Iroha game)
Male characters - Kyo Kusanagi, K', Ash Crimson, Haohmaru, Genjuro Kibagami, Setsuna, Kojiroh Sanada
Exclusive character - Kamisaki Misato

== See also ==
- The King of Fighters series
- KOF: Maximum Impact 2
- Samurai Shodown series
