= Samurai Shodown III =

1995 video game

Samurai Shodown III: Blades of Blood
- Developer: SNK: Be Top (Game Boy) Ukiyotei (PlayStation) SIMS (Saturn)
- Publishers: SNK: Takara (Game Boy) PlayStation; JP: SNK; WW: Sony Computer Entertainment
- Producer: Eikichi Kawasaki
- Series: Samurai Shodown
- Platform: Arcade: Game Boy, Neo Geo AES, Neo Geo CD, PlayStation, Sega Saturn
- Release: November 15, 1995: Arcade; WW: November 15, 1995 Neo Geo AES; WW: December 1, 1995 Neo Geo CD; JP/EU: December 29, 1995 Game Boy; JP: August 23, 1996 PlayStation; JP: August 30, 1996; NA: November 30, 1996; EU: 1996 Saturn; JP: November 8, 1996
- Genre: Fighting
- Modes: Single-player, multiplayer
- Arcade system: Neo Geo MVS

Samurai Shodown III: Blades of Blood (Note: Also known as Samurai Spirits: Peerless Blade of Zankuro (Japanese: サムライスピリッツ: 斬紅郎無双剣, Hepburn: Samurai Supirittsu: Zankurō Musōken) in Japan and Fighters Swords in Korea.) is a 1995 fighting game developed and published by SNK for the Neo Geo arcade and home platforms. While it is the third game in the main Samurai Shodown series, it is the first part of a two-chapter story that is chronologically set between the events of Samurai Shodown and Samurai Shodown II.

The game has a darker aesthetic compared to its predecessors. Gameplay is significantly changed introduction of two selectable versions of each character: "Slash" (chivalry) and "Bust" (treachery). Each version comes with its own moves and fighting styles; Slash is closer to the first two games, while Bust is a more aggressive style that introduces new moves. Controls were also updated; a new layout dedicates three of four buttons to weapon attacks and one for kicking attacks, as opposed to two buttons for weapons and kicks each. Tactical changes include priority for special moves as well as replacing the free movement system with a more restrained parry system.

Samurai Shodown III was released on SNK's Neo Geo AES and Neo Geo CD consoles as well as the PlayStation and Saturn systems. A Game Boy version with a slightly different roster and features was released only in Japan by Takara, a team responsible for the porting of several other SNK arcade games to consoles and handhelds.

== Gameplay ==
Gameplay screenshot showcasing a match between Nakoruru and Haohmaru.

Compared to the others in the series, the game has a darker aesthetic. The more light-hearted characters (Earthquake, Cham Cham, and Gen-an) from the previous games have been excised, and the kabuki master, Kyoshiro Senryo, received a redesign, transforming him from a flamboyant stage performer into a grim-faced, muscular man. All of the characters have been completely redrawn.

Also, the button layout was changed, mapping the first three of the four available buttons to weak, medium and strong slash attacks, respectively. The fourth button is used for kick attacks.

The pace of the game shifted somewhat, as many basic attacks can be canceled into special moves, something which is extremely rare in the first two installments. Most of Samurai Shodown 2's movement options were removed, in favor of the ability to dodge attacks by pressing the A and B buttons simultaneously. When close, performing this command results in a quick switch-around to the opponent's back, which can then be followed up by other attacks. It is also possible to block attacks in mid-air. Items are also thrown onto the battlefield from off-screen as opposed from a delivery man running in the background.

Along with the aesthetic overhaul came significant changes in the gameplay, such as the addition of two selectable versions of each character.

- Slash: Known to the Japanese as Shura (修羅), from the Sanskrit word asura. Originally, in Brahmanism and Hinduism, a devil who loves to fight by nature. It is occasionally mistranslated as "Chivalry", and implies a regular fighter (compare a face in professional wrestling). This version tends to be the closest in style and moves to the Samurai Shodown II version of the character.
- Bust: Known to the Japanese as Rasetsu (羅刹), which is a derivation of the Sanskrit word, rakshasa, in reference to a type of demon of black body (hence, the darker skin of bust characters). It is occasionally mistranslated as "Treachery", implying a rulebreaking heel version of the character. This version typically differs considerably from its Slash counterpart in gameplay, though it visually does not look different beyond its color palette. The fighter Nakoruru is the only notable exception to this. The "Slash" version of her character is accompanied by her pet hawk, Mamahaha, as in the two previous SS games. Her "Bust" version, however, is accompanied by her pet wolf, Shikuru. (Like with Mamahaha, she is able to hop onto Shikuruu's back and perform modified attacks.) Galford in his "Bust" version fights without his dog, Poppy for the first time in the series.

== Characters ==
Haohmaru's role in the story is diminished, in favor of the new main character, and the overall story is smaller in scope. Eight characters return from previous games, including Shiro Tokisada Amakusa, who had previously only appeared as a boss character.

- Haohmaru
- Genjuro Kibagami
- Galford
- Kyoshiro Senryo
- Ukyo Tachibana
- Nakoruru
- Hanzo Hattori
- Shiro Tokisada Amakusa

New warriors added to the series include the following:

- Shizumaru Hisame, the semi-amnesiac, umbrella-wielding young boy, who is the main protagonist of this game. His goal is to slay Zankuro Minazuki because Shizumaru believes that Zankuro murdered his family.
- Rimururu, Nakoruru's cheerful younger sister, who wields the power of ice.
- Gaira Caffeine, the large, brash and overbearing monk who happens to be the nephew of Nicotine Caffeine. In the Korean language setting, Gaira's name is changed to "Kim Ung Che"; Kim would later become a separate character in Samurai Shodown VI.
- Basara Kubikiri, an undead spirit, seeking revenge for his own murder, and that of his lover.
- Zankuro Minazuki, the final boss of the game. He is a giant of a man, and a callous swordsman driven insane by his quest to perfect his swordsmanship. His murderous rampage sets the stage for everything else that occurs.

The Game Boy version omits Kyoshiro and Gaira, but adds Jubei Yagyu as a special boss and secret character.

== Plot ==
The first part of a two-chapter story that is chronologically set between the events of Samurai Shodown and Samurai Shodown II, Samurai Shodown III follows the journey of a young semi-amnesic boy named Shizumaru Hisame as he and many other warriors seek out a powerful and dangerous swordsman named Zankuro Minazuki for their own personal reasons.

== Release ==
Like Samurai Shodown, Samurai Shodown III was released on multiple consoles other than the Neo Geo and Neo Geo CD such as the Sega Saturn, PlayStation, and even a Game Boy version known as "Nettou Samurai Spirits: Zankuro Musouken" with Super Game Boy support capabilities. Unlike the arcade and console versions, the Game Boy version lacks Kyoshiro Senryo and Gaira Caffeine but adds Jubei Yagyu back to the roster as a hidden final boss exclusively for the game. The handheld version also builds on adding three exclusive Samurai Shodown III borders for Super Game Boy users, one being the default border, the second shown after the two bosses are unlocked and the third one used for the endings. Like the first Game Boy version of Samurai Shodown, the GB version of Samurai Shodown III also features full color art via SGB, new victory speeches, story intro for all characters, new POW super moves similar to the console versions, Bust and Slash versions of all characters, cutscenes in between matches, a Kuroko mirror match, and a two-player vs. mode via link cable or Super Game Boy. For the first time in a portable Samurai Shodown game, blood was also featured (but only in black dripping color). The Game Boy port was released only in Japan by developers Takara, the same team responsible for the porting of several other SNK arcade games to multiple consoles and handhelds.

The game was also released in Japan on the Wii Virtual Console on April 27, 2010, followed by PAL regions on September 3 and North America on September 6. Hamster Corporation re-released the game as part of their ACA Neo Geo series for the PlayStation 4, Xbox One, Nintendo Switch, Windows, Android and iOS.

== Reception ==
Reception

Review scores
Publication	Score
Electronic Gaming Monthly	7.25/10 (Neo Geo)
GameSpot	6.7/10 (PS1)
Next Generation	3/5 (Neo Geo); 2/5 (PS1)
Maximum	4/5 (Neo Geo CD)

In Japan, Game Machine listed Samurai Shodown III as the most-popular arcade game of the year. According to Famitsu, the AES version sold over 48,757 copies in its first week on the market.

Samurai Shodown III received moderately positive reviews. Reviewing the Neo Geo AES version, Electronic Gaming Monthly remarked that the graphics are not as good as the first two games in the series and that the Neo Geo controller makes it difficult to pull off some moves, but they greatly praised the large number of characters and the two different personas for each character, and in general rated the gameplay as superior to the first two Samurai Shodowns. Major Mike of GamePro commented that impressive innovations such as the multiple personas and the sidestep ability are to an extent countered by the omission on some of the best characters from the previous games and the less impressive backgrounds. He concluded that "While Shodown III won't disappoint fans of the series, it isn't the jump that Shodown II was over I." A brief review in Next Generation similarly said that "Fans of the first two won't be let down by III, but there should be a much larger jump in quality in the sequel." Maximum assessed the Neo Geo CD version as "an excellently detailed and extremely playable beat 'em up, maintaining SNK's usual high standards." They particularly praised the fact that character alignment affects the gameplay instead of just cosmetic differences, the much improved balance of the characters, the constantly moving backgrounds, and the highly experimental soundtrack. They remarked that the game's one major problem is that it is irritatingly difficult.

Scary Larry of GamePro described the PlayStation version as "a lousy port of an equally bad NeoGeo game", citing missing frames of animation, slowdown, and overly drawn-out fights. He scored it a 1.0 out of 5 in both control and funfactor, giving a 2.5 out of 5 to graphics and sound. GameSpot also commented on the missing frames of animation and slowdown in the PlayStation version, and additionally criticized the "excruciatingly long" loading times, but nonetheless concluded that "Those who loved the arcade game version of Samurai Shodown III will be happy with this conversion." A review in Next Generation assessed it as a faithful port (and in particular a superior effort to the PlayStation version of The King of Fighters '95) but, consistent with their review of the Neo Geo version, criticized the game itself as "nearly indistinguishable" from Samurai Shodown II.
