= Fatal Fury: The Motion Picture =

1994 animated film by Masami Ōbari

- Theatrical release poster
- Directed by: Masami Ōbari
- Written by: Takashi Yamada
- Based on: Fatal Fury by SNK
- Produced by: Hiromichi Mogaki; Susumu Nakajima; Yumiko Shigeoka; Yoshihiro Suzuki; Tatsuji Yamazaki
- Starring: Kazukiyo Nishikiori; Keiichi Nanba; Nobuyuki Hiyama; Kotono Mitsuishi; Tomo Sakurai; Shinichiro Miki; Yō Inoue; Shō Hayami; Kenji Utsumi
- Cinematography: Seiichi Morishita
- Edited by: Hajime Okayasu
- Music by: Toshihiko Sahashi
- Production company: Studio Comet
- Distributed by: Shochiku
- Release date: July 16, 1994
- Running time: 96 minutes
- Country: Japan
- Language: Japanese

Fatal Fury: The Motion Picture (Note: Known in Japan as Garō Densetsu The Motion Picture (餓狼伝説 THE MOTION PICTURE, Garō Densetsu Za Mōshon Pikuchā; lit. Legend of the Hungry Wolf: The Motion Picture)) is a 1994 Japanese animated feature film based on the 1993 video game by SNK titled Fatal Fury Special, originally released in Japan on July 16, 1994. It was directed by character designer Masami Ōbari and follows the same continuity as the preceding two TV specials, Fatal Fury: Legend of the Hungry Wolf and Fatal Fury 2: The New Battle, but this movie shifts from arcade canon to an all-new storyline centering on original characters, although many of the characters from the first two Fatal Fury specials make extensive cameo appearances through the film.

The original ending theme in Japanese is "Yoake no Legend" ("Dawn of a Legend") by Kazukiyo Nishikiori of Shonentai. For the North American film release, the song was given the title "Oh Angel", and re-recorded with English lyrics by Canadian singer Warren Stanyer.

== Plot ==
While exploring a cave in Egypt, Cheng Sinzan discovers a leg armor plate, one of six pieces of the legendary Armor of Mars. He is defeated by Laocorn Gaudeamus and his henchmen—Panni, Hauer, and Jamin—who claim the piece. In Japan, Joe Higashi celebrates a Muay Thai victory and reunites with Terry and Andy Bogard, along with Mai Shiranui. The group encounters Sulia, Laocorn's younger twin sister, who is fleeing from Cheng (now under Laocorn's influence). Sulia explains that she is seeking Terry's help to stop her brother.

Sulia reveals that she is descended from Gaudeamus, an ancient warrior whose mystical armor brought destruction until it was split into six pieces to prevent its misuse. Laocorn intends to reassemble the armor to gain ultimate power. The heroes—Terry, Andy, Joe, Mai, and Sulia—travel to Rhodes, where cave paintings link Gaudeamus' techniques to legendary martial arts moves such as Tung Fu Rue's Hurricane Punch and Wolfgang Krauser's Blitz Ball. Sulia, who shares a psychic bond with her brother, uses her powers to determine the locations of the remaining armor pieces, prompting the group to split up.

Terry, Joe, and Sulia search for the breastplate, tracing it from Turkey to Krauser's Stroheim Castle in Germany, while Andy and Mai pursue the leg armor in Baghdad. Andy learns that the piece was taken to China centuries ago, and their only lead is Jubei Yamada, a friend of Tung Fu Rue. After a skirmish with Billy Kane and an encounter with Hauer, Andy learns the armor's location but loses it to Hauer, who defeats him and Mai.

Meanwhile, Terry and Sulia battle Laocorn and Jamin. Terry is badly injured but saved by Sulia, who uses part of her life force to heal him. She recounts how their father was killed by a business partner during an expedition to find the Armor of Mars, an event that fueled Laocorn's obsession. Terry vows to protect Sulia and stop her brother. Panni defeats Laurence Blood and secures the breastplate for Laocorn.

Reunited in Rhodes, the heroes learn that the final piece—the crown—remains unfound. Using Sulia's pendant, they locate it at the Dead Sea in Israel. In Jerusalem, Laocorn's forces ambush the group. Sulia surrenders to her brother to protect her friends, while Andy and Mai defeat Panni and Hauer.

At the Dead Sea, Laocorn raises an ancient temple and claims the crown, completing the armor, which encases him in vermeil and greatly amplifies his power. Terry, Andy, Joe, and Mai fight Laocorn but are overpowered. Sulia, knowing their psychic bond can weaken him, injures herself, and finally stabs herself in the chest. As she dies, she urges Terry to strike Laocorn's breastplate. Terry shatters it, reducing the armor into coins. The group mourns Sulia's death as Terry kisses her farewell. The armor merge with a statue of Mars, reviving the god.

Realizing that the armor used him as a vessel for Mars' resurrection, Laocorn redeems himself by sacrificing his life to protect Andy and Mai from Mars' attack. Terry, in a desperate rage defeats Mars alone in a final battle. As the temple collapses, the surviving heroes—Terry, Andy, Mai, and Joe—escape, with Terry casting his cap into the air as they leave.

== Voice cast ==
Character	Japanese voice actor	English dubbing actor
Terry Bogard	Kazukiyo Nishikiori	Mark Hildreth
Andy Bogard	Keiichi Nanba	Peter Wilds
Joe Higashi	Nobuyuki Hiyama	Jason Gray-Stanford
Mai Shiranui	Kotono Mitsuishi	Lisa Ann Beley
Sulia Gaudeamus	Tomo Sakurai	Myriam Sirois
Laocorn Gaudeamus	Shin-ichiro Miki	Matt Hill
Panni	Yō Inoue	Janyse Jaud
Hauer	Shō Hayami	Paul Dobson
Jamin	Kenji Utsumi	John Payne
Kim Kaphwan	Daiki Nakamura	David Kaye
Kim Myonsaku (Kim's wife)	Shiho Niiyama	Janyse Jaud
Kim Dong Hwan	Kaoru Fujino	n/a
Cheng Sinzan	Chafurin	Robert O. Smith
Big Bear	Hisao Egawa	Robert O. Smith
Billy Kane	Tomohiro Nishimura	Paul Dobson
Duck King	Yūji Mitsuya	Matt Hill
Lily McGuire	Kikuko Inoue	Willow Johnson
Jubei Yamada	Jōji Yanami	French Tickner
Richard Meyer	Masaharu Satō	Ward Perry
Laurence Blood	Kōji Totani	Ward Perry
Geese Howard	Hidekatsu Shibata	Ward Perry
Mayor	Ikuya Sawaki	Robert O. Smith
Show Girl	Junko Hagimori	Lisa Ann Beley
Reiko Chiba	Reiko Chiba	Trish Ledoux

== Production ==
For the theatrical film, director and character designer Masami Ōbari substantially redesigned the appearance of the characters compared with the two preceding Fatal Fury television specials.

== Release ==
Fatal Fury: The Motion Picture was theatrically released in Japan by Shochiku on July 16, 1994. Viz Video subsequently released an English-dubbed VHS edition in North America in September 1995. Discotek Media released the film on Blu-ray in North America on July 25, 2017.

== Cameo appearances ==
- Reiko Chiba, a singer and voice actress who posed as Nakoruru in SNK's Samurai Shodown advertising campaign has two speaking roles in the original Japanese version of the film. She is best known for playing Mei in the Japanese Super Sentai series, Kyōryū Sentai Zyuranger.
  - The first is right after Joe's bout with Hwa Jai in which she congratulates him. He instantly recognizes her as "THAT Reiko Chiba" (in the English version of the same scene, Reiko's character is not named and Joe simply asks if it is "really her").
  - The second is during a scene in Duck King's "King of Dancing" nightclub, when she, dressed as her character Nakoruru, switches places with Mai, who has disappeared in order to get ready for a surprise stage performance. This can be considered somewhat of a double in-joke, as Reiko once performed an image song for Mai on the arranged soundtrack to Fatal Fury Special.

== Reception ==
Contemporary English-language reviews included highly positive assessments from ''Hyper'' and ''GameFan''. In 1997, Max Autohead of Hyper magazine gave it a highly positive review, scoring it 10 out of 10 and calling it "without a doubt the best animated martial arts slug fest movie I have seen." In 1998, Shidoshi of GameFan magazine gave it a B+ rating and considered it the best game-based anime to date, better than adaptations of Street Fighter and Samurai Shodown.

In his review for Anime News Network's "Shelf Life" column, Bamboo Dong called Discotek Media's release of the film "one of the most enjoyable, and the easiest to consume as a standalone property". Dong praised the storyline and character designs, and would later go on to say "those who are into this kind of thing will be pleased with how it's presented, and how lovingly it's been preserved". Conversely, Raphael See of THEM Anime Reviews gave the film two out of five stars. She praised the film's artwork but criticized the storyline, saying it "wasn't enough to save this flick from my boredom".

== In other media ==
In 2026, Laocorn Gaudeamus was added as a playable character in the video game Fatal Fury: City of the Wolves.
