= List of Yume no Crayon Oukoku characters =

Yume no Crayon Oukoku characters

This is a list of fictional characters appearing in the anime and manga series Yume no Crayon Oukoku.

== Main and supporting characters ==
Princess Silver (シルバー王女, Shiruba Ōjo)
Voiced by: Yuka Tokumitsu
Princess Silver is the princess of the Crayon Kingdom. Direct ancestor to the legendary Queen who defeated the Grim Reaper, she is his primary target.
As an only child, Silver is spoiled, greedy, selfish and vain: which are only a few of her "Twelve bad habits".
When her parents are changed into statues, Silver is determined to free them herself and she goes after the boy who she believes is the Grim Reaper. She truly cares for those who are close to her, including Araessa and Stonston and the twelve magic vegetables.
She has a love/hate relationship with Prince Cloud. When she first meets him, she describes him to be "handsome" and that he has "the King's blond hair and the Queen's blue eyes". She gets extremely angry at him for constantly reproaching her about her "twelve bad habits" and often tells him that she hates him. However, she shares many "romantic moments" with him, which usually consists of her mistaking an insult for a compliment, and gazing at him blushingly, only to be brought back to her senses once she realizes that he had insulted her. She once tells Araessa that she had "fallen in love once, but decided never to do so again", after which an illusion of Prince Cloud is seen in her mind. She asks Prince Cloud to dance with her at the end of Episode 49, to which he accepts. In French, Silver is known as "Princesse Diamant" (Princess Diamond) and in Italian, "Luna Argentata" (Silver Moon).
Stonston (ストンストン)
Voiced by: Junko Takeuchi
A pig that goes with Silver to find the grim reaper. Stonston is a lowly castle guard who gets sent along with the princess because he had nothing better to do. As befitting his species, Stonston is constantly hungry and thinks about almost nothing else but food during the group's adventures, which sometimes lands them in trouble. While his appetite can be a problem, he does try to do his best. In Episode 44, it is revealed that Stonston's mother passed away shortly after he was born. In French, he is known as "Patachon".
Araessa (アラエッサ)
Voiced by: Osamu Sakata
A rooster that goes with Silver. He is an orphan and was bought up by a tigress. Like Stonston, he is a lowly castle guard who gets sent along with the princess because he had nothing better to do. Along with assisting the princess, Araessa is also given the additional task of photographing flowers and other scenic imagery for the Crayon Kingdom's hanafuda production. In French, he is known as "Nicorico".
Prince Cloud (クラウド, Kuraudo)
Voiced by: Nanaho Katsuragi
The boy who travels with Princess Silver. He is quite conceited and, like Princess Silver, is quick to anger. He specializes in swordsmanship. He has blond hair, blue eyes, and is dressed in white tights, a blue tunic, and wears a crown. Princess Silver has a crush on him and in some episodes, he seems to return her feelings. In the first series, he is 13 years old. In French, he is known as "Prince Theo" and in Italian, "Principe Claude".
The Grim Reaper (死神, Shinigami)
Voiced by: Ken Yamaguchi
He is the object of Silver's quest, as only he can remove the curse on her parents. Despite his history and status as the one who fought Queen Buretsu in the past, most of his present day schemes in trying to dispose of the princess amount to nothing more than harebrained ideas. Toward the middle of the story, he tends to frequently interfere in the group's travels, but often ends up humiliated. His personality and behavior are both rather silly, despite his intimidating appearance. In French, he is known as "Le Roi des Ombres" (The King of Shadows).
Prime Minister Chameleon (カメレオン総理)
Voiced by: Kenji Nomura
Prime Minister in the Crayon Kingdom. He regularly calls to check up on Princess Silver. He tends to be a nervous wreck and has to deal with a lot of the kingdom's problems in the absence of the king and queen. When he was younger, he tried to give a love letter to a chameleon lady he was enamored with, but after she heartlessly tore it up and gave it back to him, he decided that pursuing love was nothing but a waste of time and completely engrossed himself in his studies to become the Prime Minister.

=== Vegetable Spirits ===
Spirits encased in perfume bottles that are summoned when Princess Silver needs help.
Tomorokofusuki (トモロコフスキー)
Voiced by: Yūta Mochizuki
Tofumon (トーフモン)
Voiced by: Ginzou Matsuo
Umekero (ウメケロ)
Voiced by: Yayoi Nakazawa
Tomatomato (トマトマト)
Voiced by: Chihiro Sakurai
Sososonasu (ソソソナス)
Voiced by: Yoji Ietomi
Kyabetta (キャーベッタ)
Voiced by: Megumi Takamura
Negikku (ネギック)
Voiced by: Kouki Miyata
Nobiruja (ノビルジャー)
Voiced by: Yoshihiko Akaida
Horesore (ホーレソレ)
Voiced by: Hiroko Konishi
Gomata (ゴマータ)
Voiced by: Rumi Shishido
Ninjippi (ニンジッピ)
Voiced by: Miwa Matsumoto
Renkopocchi (レンコポッチ)
Voiced by: unknown

== Other characters ==
Punya (プーニャ, Pūnya)
Voiced by: Yukiko Hanioka
A cat who became the caretaker of Princess Silver after the Grim Reaper's sealing. She felt responsible for the angels escaping from the clock.
Shakatick (シャカチック, Shakachikku)
Voiced by: Yuki Matsuoka
Debuted in episode 50. A mischievous angel who tends to be rough and short-tempered and cause mischief with Yukutac by shooting an arrow.
Yukutac (ユックタック, Yukkutakku)
Voiced by: Nami Miyahara
Debuted in episode 50. A mischievous angel who is calm and quiet and causes mischief with Shakatick.
Silver-go (シルバー号, Shirubā-gō)
Voiced by: Megumi Takamura
Debuted in episode 50. A pink train that runs through a railway in the Crayon Kingdom.
Bell Conductor (ベル車掌, Beru-shashō)
Voiced by: Kyosei Tsukui
Debuted in episode 50. The clock-shaped conductor of the Silver-go train.
