= Reiko Chiba =

Japanese actress, voice actress, gravure idol and singer (born 1975)

- 千葉 麗子
- Born: January 8, 1975 (age 51); Tennōji Ward, Osaka, Japan
- Occupations: Actress; voice actress; singer; gravure idol; political activist
- Years active: 1991–present
- Spouse: Tetsuhito Kirihara (m. 1998)
- Children: 1

Reiko Chiba (千葉 麗子, Chiba Reiko; born January 8, 1975) is a Japanese actress, voice actress, gravure idol, occasional J-pop singer, and political activist.

== Biography ==
Reiko Chiba was born on January 8, 1975, in Osaka Prefecture, and raised in Fukushima Prefecture. She started her career as a model in 1991 before making her acting debut in the 1992 Super Sentai series Kyōryū Sentai Zyuranger as Mei/Ptera Ranger. When the series was adapted into the US version Mighty Morphin Power Rangers, it aired in Japan where Chiba, herself, re-dubbed both Ptera Ranger and the US footage of actress Amy Jo Johnson who played her character, now known as Kimberly Ann Hart/Pink Ranger. After the end of the series, Chiba made her J-Pop debut on April 7, 1993, as a member of Aurora Gonin Musume. She provided the vocals for the main theme song of Fatal Fury Special titled "Non Stop! One Way Love" and participated in the game's first image album, released in April 1994. She also did a cameo voice appearance as herself in the anime movie Fatal Fury: The Motion Picture, performed the voice of Cham Cham in the Samurai Shodown video game series, and had a spot in the nightly radio show Akihabara Young Denkikan. Chiba retired from the entertainment industry in 1995. However, she has made several public appearances in recent years at comic and anime conventions in the United States to help promote the official US release of Zyuranger on DVD.

== Personal life ==
When she married Tetsuhito Kirihara in 1998, her legal name became Reiko Kirihara (桐原 麗子, Kirihara Reiko). However, she continues to be known by either her maiden name or "Chibarei" in business and other public contexts. Since her marriage and the birth of a son in 1999, Chiba has adopted a more mature public persona. She is currently active as a certified yoga instructor, teaching yoga classes and issuing a series of instructional books and videos. She also continues to pose for publications such as Weekly Playboy. Chiba is also the public face of the corporation Cherrybabe, Inc.

In 2011, Chiba spoke out about enduring years of depression and has become an advocate of Kokoro no Mimi (こころの耳), the Ministry of Health, Labour and Welfare's mental health portal website.

Chiba currently resides in Itoshima, Fukuoka.

== Filmography ==
=== TV series ===
- Kyōryū Sentai Zyuranger – Mei/Ptera Ranger (1992–1993)
  - Mighty Morphin Power Rangers (Kimberly Ann Hart/Pink Ranger via Kyōryū Sentai Zyuranger footage)
- Under the Same Roof (1993)
- Minami-kun no Koibito (1994) (Risako Nomura)
- Ninja Sentai Kakuranger – episode 25 guest appearance Reika (1994)

=== TV special ===
- Samurai Shodown: The Motion Picture – Nakoruru (1994)

=== Film ===
- Fatal Fury: The Motion Picture – Herself / Nakoruru (1994, voice only)
- Super Sentai World – Ptera Ranger (1994, voice only)
- Zyuden Sentai Kyoryuger vs. Go-Busters: The Great Dinosaur Battle! Farewell Our Eternal Friends – Ptera Ranger (2014, voice only)

=== Anime OVA ===
- Wild 7 – Iko (1994)

=== Video games ===
- Samurai Shodown II – Cham Cham (1994)
- The King of Fighters EX: Neo Blood – Moe Habana (2002)
