= Michinori =

- Gender: Male

Origin
- Origin: Japanese
- Meaning: Different meanings depending on the kanji used

Michinori (written: 道教, 通教, 通憲 or 倫範) is a masculine Japanese given name. Notable people with the name include:

- Fujiwara no Michinori (藤原 通憲) (1106–1160), Japanese scholar and Buddhist monk
- Kujō Michinori (九条 道教) (1315–1349), Japanese kugyō
- Michinori Shiraishi (白石 通教) (1910–1945), Japanese military officer
- Michinori Tanaka (田中 路教) (born 1990), Japanese mixed martial artist
- Michinori Yamashita (山下 倫範) (born 1953), Japanese mathematician
