= Ami Kawai =

Japanese television and theater actress (born 1967)

- 河合 亞美
- Born: Aya Fujima; December 15, 1967 (age 58); Tokyo, Japan
- Occupation: Actress
- Website: http://www1.ocn.ne.jp/~amipage/

Ami Kawai (河合 亞美 (亜美), Kawai Ami; born December 15, 1967) is a Japanese television and theater actress, best known in Japan for her role as Marsha in Kidou Keiji Jiban and Lamy in Kyōryū Sentai Zyuranger (the latter known as Scorpina in Mighty Morphin Power Rangers).

== Biography ==
Kawai was born to a restaurant manager and actress Rie Kawai in Tokyo. She comes from a lineage of actors, including her grandmother and great-grandfather. Her older sister is Katsumi Fujita, who is an environmental planning designer, most recently contributing to the sign for Park Hyatt in Seoul, Korea. Her mother has been managing a small bar in Takadanobaba, an area close to Waseda University in Shinjuku, Tokyo.

Kawai attended Jissen Women's Academy Junior High School and High School. She majored in English literature at the Department of Literature in Jissen Women's College. While attending elementary school, she belonged to Gekidan Komadori, a theater company. Her achievements there include television, soap operas, educational programs, commercials, radio soap operas, and foreign films. She temporarily stopped her activities because her middle school and high school outlawed outside activities relating to the entertainment industry. While attending college, she was scouted by a production company, resuming her show biz career.

== Career ==
Her first drama feature role was in FNN's Onna mo Otoko mo naze Korinai (Neither Man Nor Woman Inexplicably Do Not Learn). Her other major achievements as an actress include movies and theaters while also serving as reporter, newscaster, and host of various television programs.

Kawai is best known for her role as Lamy in the 1992 Super Sentai series Kyōryū Sentai Zyuranger. While some people have distanced themselves from their role in the Super Sentai series, she appears to have fond memories of her role. As she appeared towards the middle of the series, she had a tough learning curve to overcome, but overcame it well. Kawai's official websites mentions several behind-the-scene experiences playing the role. These include confronting her fear of heights when she had to stand from the tip of a tall building the first time she appeared on screen and her embarrassment of turning into a monster when her character became a giant.

For the Power Rangers series in the North America, Scorpina was credited as "Ami Kawai" the first time she appeared, but later credited to American voice actress, Wendee Lee (Because Ami Kawai was not fluent in English and her voice are dubbed by Wendee Lee). Scorpina was immensely popular among public viewers that when the production ran out of her footage, much speculation emerged as to her fate.

Before the Power Rangers popularity she was already known in Europe and Latin America for her role in Kidou Keiji Jiban, although her role there was shared with Akemi Furukawa who played a similar secondary character.

In recent years, Kawai has undergone a major image change. She does not have long black hair; instead, she has lightly dyed brown, short hair. She is not in the forefront of the entertainment industry in Japan, choosing to focus her time learning and teaching Japanese traditional dance, buyo. In late 2006, for her efforts, she was given the name Aya Fujima (藤間 絢也, Fujima Aya).

== Filmography ==
=== Television ===
- NHK- Hivision de Konnichiwa (Hello in High Vision)
- NTV- Keijikizoku 3 (Officer Aristocracy 3)
- NTV- Kasetsu no Yukue (Whereabouts of Hypothesis)
- TBS- Kabegiwazoku ni Hanataba wo (Flower bundles for Those by the Wall)
- TBS- Toshiba Sunday Theater: Sentimental Journey
- TBS- Toshiba Sunday Theater- Moo Itido, Haru (Spring, Once More)
- TBS- Business Zoomup
- TBS- Just
- FNN- Onna mo Otoko mo naze Korinai (Neither Man Nor Woman Inexplicably Do Not Learn)
- FNN- Kyoto Misu Eigamura Satsujin Jiken (Kyoto Movie Village Murder Incident) FNN- Ghoster Hunter Saki
- FNN- Saishu no Sairetsu (Funeral line of a Buddhist Priest)
- FNN- Koojyo no Reikyuu (The Coffin of an Imperial Princess)
- FNN- Tsugaru satsujin jiken (Tsugaru Murder Incident )
- FNN (Skyperfect TV)- Science Channel: Jun-san no Omosiro Testudoo Kenkyuujyo (Jun's Interesting Railroad Research Laboratory)
- TV Asahi- Mitsushitsu no Yonjyuusoo (Quartet in a Secret Room)
- TV Asahi- Kidookeiji Jiban (Machine Police Jiban)
- TV Asahi- Prestage: Jyoohoo Saizenretsu Frontrow (Information Upfront Frontrow)
- TV Asahi- Noto Hantoo Onna no Satsujin Fuukei (Noto Peninsula: the Scenery of a Woman's Murder)
- TV Asahi- Tokyuu Shirei Solbrain 1991-1992 (Super Rescue Solbrain)
- TV Asahi- Kyōryū Sentai Zyuranger (Dinosaur Squadron Zyuranger)
- TV Asahi- Hotel Doctor
- TV Asahi- Sasurai Keiji Ryojyoo Hen
- TV Asahi- Hagure keiji Jyunyjoo Ha
- TV Asahi- Ninja Sentai Kakuranger (Ninja Squadron Kakuranger)
- TV Asahi- Juukou B-Fighter
- TV Asahi- Munetani Honsen Satsujin Jiken
- TV Tokyo- Abunai Syoonen (Dangerous Teen)
- TV Tokyo- Abunai Syoonen 2 (Dangerous Teen 2)
- TV Tokyo- Abunai Syoonen 3 (Dangerous Teen 3)
- TV Tokyo- Fureai Deai Tabi
- TV Tokyo- Doyoo Special: Honobono Ressya no Tabi (Saturday Special: Train Journey)
- TV Tokyo- Happy Relay Concert

=== Theater ===
- Pasta to Kakesoba (Pasta and Noodles), Aoyama Round Theater
- Maborosi no Mati (The Visionary City)

=== Film ===
- Kidoo Keiji Jiban Eigahen (Machine Officer Jiban: The Movie)
- Funky Monty Teacher 2 Buruburu
- Tensiteki Kyuujitsu (Burburu: Angelic Holiday)
- Purogorufa Sikibe Kinjiroo 3 (Professional golfer Kinjiro Shikibe 3)
- Jinzoo Ningen Hakaida (Artificial Human Hakaida)
