= Samurai Shodown: The Motion Picture =

- Based on: Samurai Shodown by SNK
- Written by: Nobuaki Kishima
- Directed by: Hiroshi Ishiodori
- Music by: Kaoru Wada
- Country of origin: Japan
- Original language: Japanese

Production
- Producers: Hiromichi Mogaki; Tatsuji Yamazaki; Yoshihiro Suzuki
- Cinematography: Seiichi Morishita
- Editor: Hajime Okayasu
- Running time: 68 minutes
- Production company: Studio Comet

Original release
- Network: Fuji TV
- Release: September 8, 1994

Samurai Shodown: The Motion Picture (Note: Known in Japan as Samurai Spirits: Haten Gōma no Shō (SAMURAI SPIRITS 〜破天降魔の章〜, Samurai Supirittsu Haten Gōma no Shō)) is a Japanese animated television special based upon the 1993 SNK video game Samurai Shodown. It was released by SNK in association with Fuji TV and NAS and animated by both Studio Comet and Studio Gazelle, Co., Ltd..

An unrelated 2-episode OVA based on the same series was later released based on Samurai Spirits 2: Asura Zanmaden, which has never been adapted into English.

== Story ==
During a bloody war in the Warring States period of Japan, an earthquake erupts and six respective warriors around the globe take heed of the events. As the dark god, Ambrosia, is resurrected, the battlefield is set ablaze. In the ashes, Haohmaru searches for the traitor, Shiro Tokisada Amakusa. He is upset that she betrayed her vows as one of the "Holy Warriors", destined fighters who keep the seal over Ambrosia from being broken. Though she tempts him to join her, Haohmaru resists and is eventually backed up by the remaining Holy Warriors: Charlotte, Wan-fu, Nakoruru, Tam Tam, and Galford. Their assault is halted when Amakusa effortlessly defeats them and burns them alive. Though their bodies die, she is unable to destroy their souls.

A hundred years pass and Amakusa has manipulated the shogunate to serve her so she can raise her army of Jashin soldiers and Ambrosia unharmed. Well informed of the Holy Warriors' presences, she issues a private manhunt for them, hoping to kill them off before they can fully assemble. Her actions raise the suspicions of Hanzo Hattori, Jubei Yagyu, and Kyoshiro Senryo; all three plot to overthrow Amakusa's reign of tyranny though lack the manpower to do so. Hanzo tells the other two Amakusa's weakness, which appears to be the Six Holy Warriors. They agree to search for them as they are the only hope of freeing the Tokugawa clan from Ambrosia.

Meanwhile, all of the Holy Warriors have been reincarnated and are searching for their missing members. All of them remember their past lives and mission save Haohmaru, a rambunctious youth who lives with his mother in a remote village. While away to slay a wild bear, Amakusa's army—led by Earthquake—attacks his village. One of the residents sold his home out for information regarding Haohmaru. Several people are killed or wounded during the attack, including Haohmaru's mother. Enraged, Haohmaru slays many soldiers and Earthquake, partially invoking his lost memories and powers. After the attack, he runs to his dying mother. She reveals to him that she isn't her birth mother: she found him as an infant with his sword in the mountains. His divine arrival convinced her that he is ordained for a greater destiny and encourages him to follow it. She dies, leaving a grief-stricken Haohmaru to bury her and the other victims.

He is then approached by the other Holy Warriors who try to get him to join them. More concerned for getting revenge for his home, Haohmaru races towards Amakusa's castle. During their pursuit of Haohmaru, Galford holds off one of Amakusa's minions, Genan Shiranui, so the others can try to stop him. There, the ninja meets Jubei who informs him of the growing resistance against Amakusa.

At the castle, Haohmaru charges through the courtyard calling for Amakusa. The other Holy Warriors search for him with Charlotte finding him first. By then, they fall into Amakusa's trap. She taunts the inexperienced Haohmaru, again trying to tempt him to join Ambrosia's forces. His anger fuels the dark god and the other Holy Warriors eventually fall into a sealing entrapment. The Warriors combine their powers to break the evil barrier surrounding the castle, allowing Charlotte a chance to flee with Haohmaru.

The two arrive near Haohmaru's village. A group of the village's children -the lone survivors of the massacre- help the then incapacitated Haohmaru to find shelter. A week passes but his condition has yet to improve. Charlotte recognizes that the problem lies in Haohmaru's spirit and dives her spirit into his soul. Unfortunately, his mind is in Amakusa's hands. She reveals to him the reason why she betrayed her mission: her commanding officer had struck her down, attempting to kill her. With her dying breath, she broke the seal over Ambrosia and was revived as a servant for the dark god. Charlotte pleads with Haohmaru to remember his destiny, her words echoing the same message from his mother. He finally remembers his role as a Holy Warrior and frees his spirit. Awakened, he quickly defeats Genan, who was ordered to find and kill them. Hanzo greets the two and requests for their aid in the revolt against Amakusa.

They join forces and attack the castle once more, freeing the other Holy Warriors and charging with a moralized peasant army—led by Hanzo and company—to counter the Jashin forces. Haohmaru delivers the final blow to Amakusa, who is freed from Ambrosia's grasp, dying as a Holy Warrior. Ambrosia uses her body to materialize himself, forcing them to somehow create a new seal without Amakusa's help. Her spirit entreats Haohmaru to use her sword, ensuring that it will use both their powers to defeat the god. He uses it and decimates Ambrosia. The story ends with the implication that the shogunate will rebuild the country with the people's help. The Holy Warriors' fate from then on is left open to interpretation.

== Cast ==
Character	Japanese voice actor	English voice actor
Haohmaru	Shingo Katori	Milton Lawrence
Amakusa Shiro Tokisada	Yū Daiki	Marcy Rae
Nakoruru	Reiko Chiba	Carol Amerson
Charlotte	Sakiko Tamagawa	Tiffany Grant
Wan-Fu	Tesshō Genda	Rob Mungle
Galford D. Weller	Wataru Takagi	Kurt Stoll
Tam Tam	Takehito Koyasu	Drew Scroggins
Hattori Hanzō	Takeshi Aono	Rob Mungle
Earthquake	Shigezō Sasaoka	Matt Greenfield
Shiranui Genan	Kōichi Kitamura	Neal Ford
Senryo Kyoshiro	Yūji Mitsuya	Aaron Krohn
Tokugawa Yoshimune	Kazuhiko Kishino	Aaron Krohn
Chiyo (Haohmaru's mother)	Kyoko Terase	Kathleen Jenkins
Otami (Goro's mother)	Seiko Tomoe	Tiffany Grant
Child A	Tsutomu Kashiwakura	Wendee Lee Curtis
Child B	Tomoko Maruo	Kimberly Yates
Child C	Miyuki Matsushita	Carol Amerson
Goro	Tomohisa Aso	Christopher Isaac
Attendant	Tōru Senrui	Steve Bosco
Child D	Fujiko Takimoto	Lorriane Reyes
Yagyu Jubei	Takeo Chii	Brian Matthews

== Reception ==
EGM2 called it a "ridiculously overblown anime," noting that "the story is as believable as some of the more ludicrous moves pulled off by the characters."
