= Nakoruru =

- Samurai Shodown and The King of Fighters character
- Nakoruru with Mamahaha the hawk in NeoGeo Battle Coliseum
- First appearance: Samurai Shodown (1993)
- Portrayed by: English: Carol Amerson (Samurai Shodown: The Motion Picture); Risa Mei (Honor of Kings); Japanese: Nakoruru: Harumi Ikoma (Samurai Shodown - V, Neo Geo Battle Coliseum); Mikako Takahashi (Samurai Shodown VI); Reiko Chiba (Samurai Shodown: The Motion Picture, "Koko ni Oide" image song); Mai Nakahara (Samurai Spirits Oni, Samurai Spirits Kengou, The King of Fighters XIV, SNK Heroines: Tag Team Frenzy, Granblue Fantasy, The King of Fighters All Star, Samurai Shodown 2019, The King of Fighters XV); Mariko Kouda (drama CDs); Rera: Harumi Ikoma (Nakoruru ADV); Kyōko Hikami (Samurai Shodown V, Samurai Shodown V Special, Nakoruru OVA); Mikako Takahashi (Samurai Shodown VI)
- Portrayed by: Spokesmodels: Reiko Chiba (Samurai Shodown II commercials); Harumi Ikoma (Shinsetsu Samurai Spirits commercials); Sakuya Aine (The King of Fighters XIV promotion)

In-universe information
- Fighting style: Dancing Sword Arts of the Shikanna-Kamui
- Weapon: Makiri short sword
- Origin: Kamuikotan, Ainu-Moshiri (the Ainu Lands) Hokkaido (1771)
- Nationality: Japanese (Ainu)

Nakoruru (ナコルル, Nakoruru) is a fictional character in the Samurai Shodown (Samurai Spirits in Japan) series of fighting games by SNK. She is one of the series' best known and most popular characters alongside its main protagonist Haohmaru, and was introduced in the original Samurai Shodown in 1993. Nakoruru is a good-hearted, young Ainu shrine maiden who loves nature and fights evil with the help of her hawk sidekick Mamahaha. She has a younger sister named Rimururu and an aggressive, and bloodthirsty darker side alter-ego known as Rera. As one of SNK's popular mascot characters, Nakoruru has also appeared in many other games and other media.

== Conception and design ==
The series' creator Yasushi Adachi chose "the two flagship characters" Haohmaru and Nakoruru as the characters that best sum up the series, with Nakoruru being "a main character in the storyline who has to fight for her life and her destiny, and sacrifices herself in the end to preserve an important cause," and thus representing "some of the most important Samurai Shodown themes." The idea for the character came from a modern Japanese perception of the indigenous Ainu people of Hokkaido, being depicted as revering nature and peacefully coexisting with it. Before the Samurai Spirit project began, one of Nakoruru's creators had thought that "one day Ainu women should have a first-class appearance" in a video game as he thought they have had received too little attention and representation in modern media.

Her costume design was based on Ainu clothing (in two main versions depending on the length of her skirt) and she was supposed to mix a concept of a "petite girl with a lovely appearance and personality" with an "innovative" character performance of commanding a hawk companion in battle. Although Nakoruru was not directly modeled after any particular existing character, Hilda from The Great Adventure of Horus, Prince of the Sun and Kamui from The Dagger of Kamui helped her conception process. The girl that appears during Nakoruru's entrances in Capcom vs. SNK is one of her childhood friends introduced in Nakoruru: Ano Hito kara no Okurimono, Manari. Nakoruru was notably the first fighting game character brought back to life following her demise and one of the first who used a sidekick character in gameplay.

Both forms of Nakoruru appearing as separate characters in the 1999 anime film Samurai Spirits 2: Asura Zanmaden

Nakoruru is a rather petite girl that is 153 cm tall. An alternate, palette swap version of her with tanned skin, different colors of hair and eyes, and a bigger chest is the Bust Nakoruru (羅刹ナコルル, Rasetsu Nakoruru) or EX Nakoruru, a recurring "Easter egg" type character that eventually evolved into Rera. Popularly known as Purple Nakoruru (紫ナコルル, Murasaki Nakoruru), she is a crueler and cockier version of Nakoruru, more violent about fulfilling her mission to protect nature, and her companion is Shikuru the wolf. In the 1999 anime film Samurai Spirits 2: Asura Zanmaden, Rera tries to support her host in giving up fighting for a while, but eventually she understands Nakoruru in what has to be done to help Shiki. Nakoruru leaves to help Shiki, but not before Rera warns her that if she doesn't succeed, she will kill her host. Rera later appears at the end of the film telling Nakoruru to be safe on her journey. In the fan service oriented fighting game SNK Heroines: Tag Team Frenzy, Nakoruru appears as default in a "sexy vampire" costume with a bat as her animal, while in The King of Fighters XIV she can be dressed up in a modern schoolgirl uniform of the "Kamuikotan Private High School".

== Appearances ==
=== Samurai Shodown games ===
Nakoruru is featured as a player character in most game entries in the Samurai Shodown series. She is also playable in various mobile spin-off titles, such as endless runner Samurai Shodown Slash, action game Samurai: Rougetsuki Densetsu, and rising simulation Maid by Iroha. In the series, Nakoruru is a gentle and shy teenage girl serving Mother Nature as a shamanic priestess of the Ainu religion, born on Hokkaido island in 1771. Despite her usually pacifistic ways, she became a Kamui warrior of her peaceful village Kamuikotan (神居古潭) after the death of her idolized father, and continues to fulfill this role throughout the series, fighting evil, often alongside the character Haohmaru. She is killed in the second game in the series, sacrificing herself to restore the balance of nature. She eventually merges her soul with Gaia and becomes "the holy spirit who wanders through time" in a form that resembles a koro-pok-guru.

In Samurai Shodown: Warriors Rage, the spirit of Nakoruru is an unplayable story mode character, but its PocketStation mini game is centered around her. She also featured as a non-player character mentor to the protagonist in the spin-off game, Nakoruru: Ano Hito kara no Okurimono, a 2001 visual novel adventure game which takes place between the first two games in the series.

Nakoruru fights with a treasured ceremonial makiri (a type of Ainu dagger or short sword sometimes known as "Ainu kodachi") called the Chichi-ushi (チチウシ, Father Bull). Depending on the form, she is aided by either a mountain hawk-eagle named Mamahaha (ママハハ, in her "Slash" form) or a cross between Hokkaido wolf and Siberian wolf named Shikuru (シクルゥ, in her "Bust" form), also having other animal friends. Her powers include communicating with nature, fueling her blade with ki energy, ability to reflect a projectile back to its sender using her cloak, and healing wounds with the power of nature. American ninja Galford D. Weller is in love with her. The endings for Samurai Shodown VI revealed that Nakoruru and an alter-ego of Galford traveled the world together.

=== The King of Fighters games ===
In The King of Fighters series, Nakoruru has appeared in a playable capacity in multiple games in the series in various non-canon roles. She also appeared as a non-playable character in The King of Fighters '94 Re-Bout, The King of Fighters 2000 (as a Special Striker for Yuri Sakazaki), The King of Fighters 2002: Unlimited Match, and The King of Fighters XIII (in the Japan stage and in the Android/iOS versions as a tutorial instructor).

Nakoruru made her canonical playable debut in The King of Fighters XIV, as the leader of the "Another World Team." Nakoruru senses a new terrible evil known as Verse arriving through rifts in space and time. Nakoruru travels to the present and teams up with other characters to defeat Verse. Nakoruru returns as a playable character in SNK All-Star, in which she and other characters from games set in the past awaken in the modern world and must team up with character Kyo Kusanagi in a fight to seal away the King of Fighters series antagonist Orochi.

=== Other video games ===
Nakoruru is playable in the fighting games Capcom vs. SNK: Millennium Fight 2000 (as an unlockable secret character), Capcom vs. SNK 2, SNK vs. Capcom: The Match of the Millennium (as rival of Capcom's Morrigan Aensland), Neo Geo Battle Coliseum, SNK Gals' Fighters, and SNK Heroines: Tag Team Frenzy. She is also playable in various SNK games such as Neo Geo Tennis Coliseum, Quiz King of Fighters, and The Rhythm of Fighters.

Nakoruru has also made collaboration event appearances in many portable and mobile games, including AFK Arena, Dai Shingeki RPG! Sister Quest, Dark Avenger X, Granblue Fantasy, The King of Fighters All Star, Kingdom Story: Brave Legion, Kal Kal Kal All Together, Kotatsu Mikuni Kansai Senki, Might & Magic: Elemental Guardians, The Samurai Kingdom, Honor of Kings (Wangzhe Rongyao), Yamato Chronicle, and You Are the Hero!. In Blade Smash she was redesigned as a ninja, while in Lost Saga she was made optionally male as well female.

Nakoruru is furthermore a non-player character in the dating sims Days of Memories: Oedo Love Scroll and Kaze Maiu Miyako de Tsukamaete!, and has a cameo of Rera as Nakoruru in Sekai de Ichiban Atsui Fuyu. She appears in cards in SNK Dream Battle and SNK vs. Capcom Card Fighters DS. She also appears as a spirit in Nintendo's Super Smash Bros. Ultimate, where a Mii Fighter costume based on her is available as downloadable content.

=== Other appearances ===
Nakoruru appears in an anime film Samurai Shodown: The Motion Picture and in an anime OVA miniseries Nakoruru: Ano Hito kara no Okurimono (as titular lead character) and Samurai Spirits 2: Asura-Zanmaden (appearing along with Rera in both OVAs), also making a cameo in Fatal Fury: The Motion Picture (in a cosplay of Reiko Chiba), as well as in a number of manga releases (including as a co-protagonist of Kyoichi Nanatsuki and Yuki Miyoshi's adaptation of the first Samurai Shodown, which was serialized in the West in an American magazine Game On!). She is also featured in several of the series' drama CDs and is a member in SNK's character image band, Band of Fighters, starring in her own character image CD.

Nakoruru further shows up in pachinko slot machine systems, including prominently in "Samurai Spirits" and especially "Samurai Spirits Oni (Nakoruru)". She has dozens of figurines made in her image, and even a life-size figure, also being featured in various other merchandise such as T-shirts, and in an American collectible card game Universal Fighting System. Keeping in key with her nature-loving persona, Nakoruru was used as a mascot for SNK's environmental awareness campaigns conducted together with city administrations in Mitaka and Kyoto in 1994. In 2007, SNK Playmore also created a social action program for children using Nakoruru and the Fatal Fury star Terry Bogard as their mascots. An image of praying Nakoruru was used to support the 2011 Tōhoku earthquake and tsunami relief fund-raising.

=== Gameplay ===
To compensate for Nakoruru's short weapon range, players must rely on her speed to punish their opponents' mistakes. Nakoruru's strengths lie in her air supremacy (including aerial throws) and ability to jump around the sides of the screen. She can also recover from her moves a little quicker than other characters, making it easier for her to hit-and-run during fights. To balance her out with the rest of the cast, her attack strength is slightly weaker than most fighters. Her move set usually incorporates slightly longer ranged attacks that project her or her animal companions to her foes so her attack range is not limited to her sword. Since Samurai Shodown II, she can also reflect projectiles with the move "Kamui Ryusei". Mamahaha can be used by the player to attack opponents in a diagonal aerial attack, acting as Nakoruru's projectile and anti-air defense. The player may also command Nakoruru to use him as a mount for a limited time. Whilst she is in the air, players can command the pair to hover higher, drop, or use Nakoruru to attack foes; she may do so normally from Mamahaha's height or players may choose to drop her in a swirl attacking motion or use a diagonal nosedive attack. Her moves' names are written in Hokkaido Ainu.

Prior to Samurai Shodown V Special, Nakoruru and Rimururu have been the series' two characters notable for being immune to the Fatality-like bloody killing moves. In Samurai Shodown: Edge of Destiny, Mamahaha does not appear in fights except in special moves. The presence of monkeys in Nakoruru's stage in the original Samurai Shodown was a mistake of the background designer Tomoaki Fukui which confused many fans as there are no monkeys on Hokkaido. There have been attempts to add Nakoruru into The King of Fighters series during the 1990s: a "Samurai Shodown Team" was originally scheduled to participate in The King of Fighters '95 and The King of Fighters '96 as Nakoruru was intended to team up with Haohmaru and Galford.

== Critical reception ==
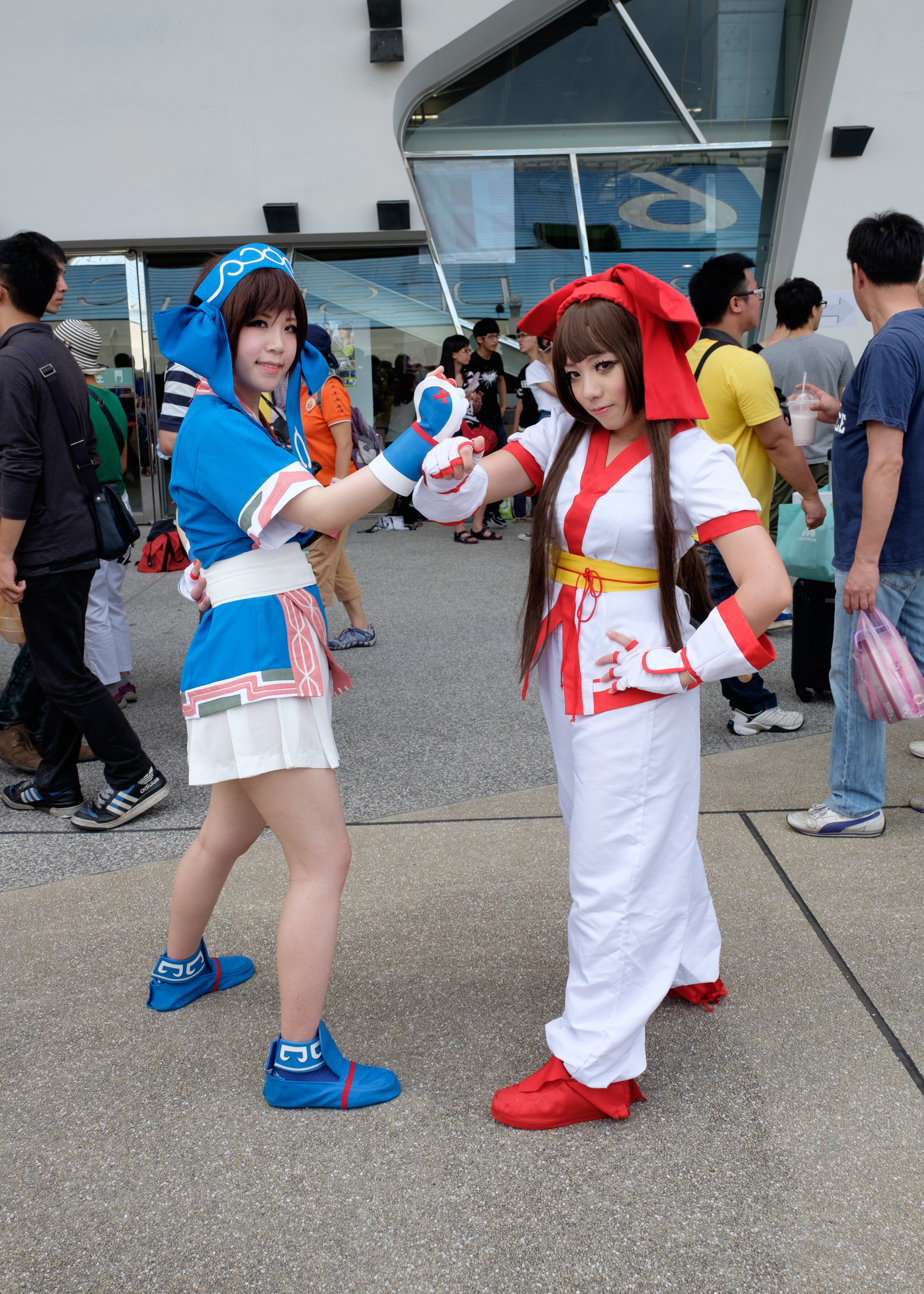
Cosplayers of Nakoruru (right) and Rimururu (left) in 2016

Nakoruru has frequently been described as being among the most popular characters associated with SNK since her debut, with her popularity stemming from her design, motifs, and her Ainu heritage. Variations of the character have been introduced in the series since, which has caused many debates over which one is the most popular. The character has been well-received worldwide, becoming especially popular in Japan. According to The King of Fighters XIV producer Yasuyuki Oda, this was a surprise, as no one at SNK had expected her to be as popular as she was. Nakoruru was added to 2016's KOF XIV due to her enduring popularity. Her popularity also resulted in some people in Japan becoming more interested in the modern Ainu people. She was named the best character of 1993 by the magazine Gamest, and she was also voted the most popular female character by male readers of Neo Geo Freak in 1997. Nakoruru became particularly popular among cosplayers, and in doujinshi fan-works. Nakoruru's hawk, Mamahaha, was regarded as a "defining moment" of Samurai Shodown, with staff citing it as an early example of a "satellite character," which they considered innovative in fighting games.

Nakoruru's ties to the culture of the Ainu people were described by the book as being an example of appropriation, with Nakoruru's popularity among fans being at odds with the struggles the Ainu people face. They additionally criticized Nakoruru as an example of how the Ainu were characterized as "something permanently located in the past," as well as how she was repeatedly "fetishized" in multiple forms of media, such as doujinshi. Christina M. Spiker, in the Journal of Anime and Manga Studies, analyzed Nakoruru's role in shaping the image of the Ainu people in popular culture. She argued that Nakoruru's popularity led to the spread of misinformation about the Ainu, especially through her portrayal in the shôjo genre, which distanced her from her Ainu roots. Spiker also critiqued the character's fetishization in doujinshi productions, emphasizing that while Nakoruru introduced Ainu culture to a broader audience, her depiction reinforced harmful stereotypes.
