= Yamashita Station =

Yamashita Station is the name of multiple railway stations in Japan.

1. Yamashita Station (Hyogo) - (山下駅) in Hyogo Prefecture
2. Yamashita Station (Miyagi) - (山下駅) in Miyagi Prefecture
3. Yamashita Station (Tokyo) - (山下駅) in Tokyo
