= Otaku no Seiza: An Adventure in the Otaku Galaxy =

1991 video game

- Box art
- Video game
- Developer: Advance Communications; Pack-In-Video
- Publisher: M&M
- Music by: Osamu Kasai; Masaaki Harada
- Genre: Role-playing video game
- Platform: Famicom
- Released: July 31, 1991
- Original video animation
- Directed by: Akira Nishimori
- Released: October 7, 1994 – November 23, 1994
- Episodes: 2

Otaku no Seiza: An Adventure in the Otaku Galaxy (おたくの星座; lit. 'Constellation of the Geeks') is a role-playing video game developed by Advance Communications and published by M&M for the Famicom in 1991. Aurora Quest: Otaku no Seiza in Another World (オーロラクエスト おたくの星座) is a remake of the Famicom version for the PC Engine Super CD-ROM by Pack-In-Video in December 1993–which featured updated graphics. Neither version was released outside of Japan. An OVA adaptation of this was also released in Japan in 1994.

The game combines science fiction and comedy. In it, an unnamed hero arrives in the city where women stole the rights of men. The player controls a man as he tries to free other men around the city. Otaku no Seiza features turn-based battles, similar to those of the Dragon Quest series.

== Gameplay ==
Otaku no Seiza features standard role-playing video gameplay. Players control a party of characters through overhead environments, including towns, dungeons, and a world map. While on the world map or in a dungeon, the party will randomly encounter enemies. The perspective switches to a first-person mode and the enemies and party members take turns attacking or healing.

== Plot ==
Otaku no Seiza tells the story of Fuyuu City, a place built in space far in the future. Aurora, a group of five attractive and powerful women, control the city. Men in the city are treated poorly compared to women, until the protagonist finds himself in the middle of the city with amnesia. Outraged, the protagonist decides to defeat Aurora and gain rights for the oppressed men of the city.

== Aurora Gonin Musume ==
Aurora Gonin Musume (オーロラ五人娘, Aurora's Five Daughters) was a short-lived J-Pop group, that made their debut on 7 April 1993 with the single "Cool Love" (クールな恋). The group was based on or represented the characters in the game. The group's members were Chiemi Chiba, Reiko Chiba, Ichiko Hashimoto, Maki Yamashita and Reiko Yamashita.
