= Ayaka Yamashita =

Ayaka Yamashita may refer to:

- Ayaka Yamashita (footballer) (born 1995), Japanese footballer
- Ayaka Yamashita (voice actress), Japanese voice actress
- Ayaka Yamashita, victim of the Kobe child murders
