= Yūta Mochizuki =

Japanese actor and voice actor (born 1967)

- 望月 祐多
- Born: 14 March 1967 (age 59); Yokohama, Kanagawa, Japan
- Occupations: Actor; voice actor
- Years active: 1991–2003; 2014
- Notable work: Ashita no Nadja as Thierry Rothschild; Boys Over Flowers as Akira Mimasaka; Kamen Rider J as Kouji Segawa/Kamen Rider J; Kyōryū Sentai Zyuranger as Geki/TyrannoRanger; Ojamajo Doremi as Keisuke Harukaze
- Height: 178 cm (5 ft 10 in)

Yūta Mochizuki (望月 祐多, Mochizuki Yūta; born 14 March 1967) is a Japanese former actor and voice actor. He is best known for playing Geki/TyrannoRanger in Kyōryū Sentai Zyuranger and the titular character of Kamen Rider J. He also voiced Keisuke Harukaze in the Ojamajo Doremi franchise, Thierry Rothschild in Ashita no Nadja, and Akira Mimasaka in Boys Over Flowers.

== Biography ==
Yūta Mochizuki was born Manabu Matsukawa (松川学, Matsukawa Manabu) on 14 March 1967 in Kanagawa Prefecture. He came from the Japan Action Club, and he joined the Japan Action Club Training School in 1984.

In 1991, he appeared in episodes 40 and 41 as one of the Neo-Jetman in Chōjin Sentai Jetman. In 1992, he starred as Geki/TyrannoRanger in Kyōryū Sentai Zyuranger. Mochizuki said that, having only known about Himitsu Sentai Gorenger at the time, when he saw the name Zyuranger he thought there would be ten people in it. Mochizuki reprised his role as Geki in the 2014 film Zyuden Sentai Kyoryuger vs. Go-Busters: The Great Dinosaur Battle! Farewell Our Eternal Friends.

Mochizuki auditioned for Kamen Rider Black, but said "I didn't hesitate". In 1994, he starred in Kamen Rider J as Kōji Segawa, the titular character. Mochizuki said in an interview that wanted the director to make a difference between Geki, a warrior from the beginning, and Segawa, an ordinary human involved in an incident, transformed, and strengthened after being remodeled.

In anime, Mochizuki voiced Keisuke Harukaze, the father of the titular character of Ojamajo Doremi, Thierry Rothschild in Ashita no Nadja, Tomorokofusuki in Yume no Crayon Oukoku, and Akira Mimasaka in Boys Over Flowers.

Mochizuki has made appearances at the 2015 Lexington Comic & Toy Convention, Power Morphicons 2014 and 2015, and attended the Japanese premiere of the Power Rangers franchise's self-titled film adaptation alongside Takumi Kizu.

=== Personal life ===
As of 2012, Mochizuki was living in Okayama Prefecture.

His special skills include karate and soccer.

== Filmography ==
=== Live-action ===
1991

- Chōjin Sentai Jetman, Neo-Jetman

1992-1993

- Kyōryū Sentai Zyuranger, Geki/TyrannoRanger

2014

- Zyuden Sentai Kyoryuger vs. Go-Busters: The Great Dinosaur Battle! Farewell Our Eternal Friends, Geki/TyrannoRanger

=== Anime ===
1996

- Boys Over Flowers, Akira Mimasaka

1997

- Yume no Crayon Oukoku, Tomorokofusuki

1999

- Ojamajo Doremi, Keisuke Harukaze

2000

- Ojamajo Doremi, Keisuke Harukaze

2001

- Ojamajo Doremi, Keisuke Harukaze

2002

- Ojamajo Doremi, Keisuke Harukaze

2003

- Ashita no Nadja, Thierry Rothschild
