= Hiroko Yamashita =

Hiroko Yamashita may refer to:

- Hiroko Yamashita (actress) (born 1963), Japanese actress
- Hiroko Yamashita (athlete) (born 1951), Japanese long jumper
