= Kyōryū Sentai Zyuranger =

Japanese television series (1992–1993)

- Title screen
- Genre: Tokusatsu; Superhero fiction Action-adventure; Science fantasy
- Created by: Toei Company
- Developed by: Noboru Sugimura
- Directed by: Shōhei Tōjō; Takeshi Ogasawara; Taro Sakamoto; Katsuya Watanabe
- Starring: Yūta Mochizuki; Seiju Umon; Hideki Fujiwara; Takumi Hashimoto; Reiko Chiba; Shiro Izumi; Machiko Soga; Ami Kawai; Jun Tatara
- Narrated by: Tōru Ōhira
- Music by: Akihiko Yoshida
- Opening theme: "Kyōryū Sentai Zyuranger" by Kenta Satou
- Ending theme: "Bouken Shite Rappapiiya!" by Gōji Tsuno and Pythagoras
- Country of origin: Japan
- Original language: Japanese
- No. of episodes: 50 (list of episodes)

Production
- Producers: Kyōzō Utsunomiya; Atsushi Kaji (TV Asahi); Takeyuki Suzuki; Shinichirō Shirakura (Toei)
- Production location: Tokyo, Japan (Greater Tokyo Area)
- Running time: approx. 25 minutes
- Production companies: TV Asahi; Toei Company; Toei Agency

Original release
- Network: ANN (TV Asahi)
- Release: February 21, 1992 – February 12, 1993

Related
- Chōjin Sentai Jetman; Gosei Sentai Dairanger

Kyōryū Sentai Zyuranger (Japanese: 恐竜戦隊ジュウレンジャー, Hepburn: Kyōryū Sentai Jūrenjā; Dinosaur Squadron Beast Ranger) (Note: "Zyu" is the Nihon-shiki and Kunrei-shiki style of romanizing what would be written in the Hepburn style as "Jū", in this case meaning "beast". An alternate kanji spelling of the word "Zyuranger" is given in the title logo as 獣連者.) is a Japanese television tokusatsu series broadcast by TV Asahi. The series is the 16th installment of Super Sentai. Directed by Shōhei Tōjō, Takeshi Ogasawara, Taro Sakamoto and Katsuya Watanabe, it stars Yūta Mochizuki, Seiju Umon, Hideki Fujiwara, Takumi Hashimoto, Reiko Chiba, Shiro Izumi, Machiko Soga, Ami Kawai and Jun Tatara. It aired from February 21, 1992 to February 12, 1993, replacing Chōjin Sentai Jetman and was replaced by Gosei Sentai Dairanger. It was the first Sentai series to have a regular Sixth Ranger, and the first to introduce the concept of sentient, living mecha, a theme that has been used frequently in the franchise ever since. It was also the first Sentai series to be adapted into an installment of the American Power Rangers series. Footage from all 50 episodes was extensively used for the first season of Mighty Morphin Power Rangers. The core Zyuranger costumes were used in all three seasons of Mighty Morphin Power Rangers and were used as the original Power Rangers costumes while the Dragon Ranger costume was adapted into the Green Ranger's costume and was used throughout Season 1 and in early Season 2. The title Toei gives this series for international distribution is Galaxy Rangers.

Cast members from the series reprised their roles for the 2014 film, Zyuden Sentai Kyoryuger vs. Go-Busters: The Great Dinosaur Battle! Farewell Our Eternal Friends.

At the 2014 San Diego Comic-Con, Shout! Factory announced that they would be releasing the entire Zyuranger series with English subtitles on DVD in North America. On February 17, 2015, Super Sentai Zyuranger: The Complete Series was released on DVD in North America. This is the first Super Sentai series to be released in North America. In addition on January 23, 2016, Shout Factory streamed the series on their website.

== Plot ==
Five young warriors from an ancient civilization of dinosaur-evolved humans (恐竜人類, Kyōryū Jinrui) are awakened during the present day after 170 million years of suspended animation when their sworn enemy Bandora the Witch is inadvertently released from her magical container on Planet Nemesis by two astronauts. The five warriors, the Zyurangers, must summon the power of mechanical-looking deities known as Guardian Beasts, each modeled after a different prehistoric beast, in order to protect mankind from Bandora's evil forces. A sixth warrior, Burai the Dragon Ranger, later becomes involved with the conflict between the Zyurangers and Bandora's forces.

== Cast ==
- Geki (ゲキ): Yūta Mochizuki (望月 祐多, Mochizuki Yūta)
- Goushi (ゴウシ, Gōshi): Seiju Umon (右門 青寿, Umon Seiju), played as Aohisa Takayasu (高安 青寿, Takayasu Aohisa)
- Dan (ダン): Hideki Fujiwara (藤原 秀樹, Fujiwara Hideki)
- Boi (ボーイ, Bōi): Takumi Hashimoto (橋本 巧, Hashimoto Takumi)
- Mei (メイ): Reiko Chiba (千葉 麗子, Chiba Reiko)
- Burai (ブライ): Shiro Izumi (和泉 史郎, Izumi Shirō)
  - Burai (young): Hisashi Sakai (酒井 寿, Sakai Hisashi)
- Bandora the Witch (魔女バンドーラ, Majo Bandōra): Machiko Soga (曽我 町子, Soga Machiko)
- Mysterious Sage Barza (不思議仙人バーザ, Fushigi Sennin Bāza): Jun Tatara (多々良 純, Tatara Jun)
- Spirit of Life Clotho (命の精霊クロト, Inochi no Seirei Kuroto): Mayumi Sakai (酒井 麻由美, Sakai Mayumi)
- Secret Scorpion Agent Lamy (秘密蠍官ラミイ, Himitsu Sasorikan Ramii): Ami Kawai (河合 亜美, Kawai Ami)
- Great Satan (大サタン, Dai Satan): Masahiko Urano (浦野 眞彦, Urano Masahiko)
- Kai (カイ, Kai): Issey Takahashi (高橋 一生, Takahashi Issei)
- Satoshi (サトシ): Yuya Tajima (手島 佑弥, Tajima Yuya)
- Satoshi's friends: Hayato Kikuchi (菊地 隼人, Kikuchi Hayato), Masashi Mikami (三上 雅士, Mikami Masashi), Hayato Seideki (青出来 隼人, Seideki Hayato)

=== Voice cast ===
- Totpat (トットパット, Tottopatto): Kaoru Shinoda (篠田 薫, Shinoda Kaoru)
- Bookback (ブックバック, Bukkubakku): Takeshi Watabe (渡部 猛, Watabe Takeshi)
- Grifforzar (グリフォーザー, Guriffōzā): Kan Tokumaru (徳丸 完, Tokumaru Kan)
- Pleprechuan (プリプリカン, Puripurikan): Yutaka Ōyama (大山 豊, Ōyama Yutaka)
- Golem Soldiers (ゴーレム兵, Gōremu Hei), Dokiita Golems (ドキータゴーレム兵, Dokīta Gōremu), Dora Cockatrice (ドーラコカトリス, Dōra Kokatorisu), Dora Cockatrice 2 (ドーラコカトリス2号, Dōra Kokatorisu Nigō), Dora Silkis (ドーラシルキス, Dōra Shirukisu): Kazuhiko Kishino (岸野 一彦, Kishino Kazuhiko)
- Great Satan (大サタン, Dai Satan): Seizō Katō (加藤 精三, Katō Seizō)
- Guardian Beast Tyrannosaurus (守護獣ティラノザウルス, Shugojū Tiranozaurusu), Daizyuzin (大獣神, Daijūjin), Gouryuzin (剛竜神, Gōryūjin): Eiji Maruyama (丸山 詠二, Maruyama Eiji)
- Guardian Beast Saber Tiger (守護獣サーベルタイガー, Shugojū Sāberu Taigā), Dora Narcissus (ドーラナルシス, Dōra Narushisu): Masaki Terasoma (寺杣 昌紀, Terasoma Masaki)
- Dora Franke (ドーラフランケ, Dōra Furanke), Zombie Franke (ゾンビフランケ, Zonbi Furanke), Satan Franke (サタンフランケ, Satan Furanke): Maroshi Tamura (田村 円, Tamura Maroshi)
- Dora Goldhorn (ドーラ金角, Dōra Kinkaku): Shōzō Iizuka (飯塚 昭三, Iizuka Shōzō)
- Narrator: Tōru Ōhira (大平 透, Ōhira Tōru)

== Episodes ==
No.	Title	Directed by	Written by	Original release date
1	"The Birth"; Transliteration: "Tanjō" (Japanese: 誕生)	Shohei Tojo	Noboru Sugimura	February 21, 1992
A Japanese space shuttle is sent to explore the planet Nemesis. The Astronauts inadvertently release the evil witch Bandora who was sealed away 170 million years ago. With Bandora released, the sage Barza summons the legendary heroes known as the Zyurangers to defeat her.
2	"The Revival"; Transliteration: "Fukkatsu" (Japanese: 復活)	Shohei Tojo	Noboru Sugimura	February 28, 1992
Bandora returns to Earth and holds the children astronauts captive.
3	"Fight in the Land of Despair"; Transliteration: "Tatakae Zetsubō no Daichi" (Japanese: 戦え絶望の大地)	Takeshi Ogasawara	Noboru Sugimura	March 6, 1992
With their weapons having been destroyed in the previous battle, the Zyurangers travel to the Land of Despair to obtain the Legendary Weapons, but must obtain them in a day or be turned into stone statues. To prevent the team from accomplishing their task, Bandora traps a mother and her son in the realm.
4	"Reawaken, Legendary Weapons"; Transliteration: "Yomigaere Densetsu no Buki" (Japanese: 甦れ伝説の武器)	Takeshi Ogasawara	Noboru Sugimura	March 13, 1992
With time running out, the Zyurangers must finish their trials to gain the Legendary Weapons.
5	"Scary Riddles"; Transliteration: "Kowāi Nazonazo" (Japanese: 怖～いナゾナゾ)	Taro Sakamoto	Noboru Sugimura	March 27, 1992
The Zyurangers struggle to fight as a team as the new Dora Monster, Dora Sphinx, punishes anyone who fails to solve his riddles. Meanwhile, Geki has a reoccurring nightmare of a post-apocalyptic Tokyo.
6	"Arise, Daizyuzin!"; Transliteration: "Tate!! Daijūjin" (Japanese: 立て!! 大獣神)	Taro Sakamoto	Noboru Sugimura	April 3, 1992
The Guardian Beasts show Geki a vision of the future where the Zyurangers failed to stop Bandora, the same vision from his nightmare. Geki solves Dora Sphinx's riddles and saves the other rangers. Having proved his leadership abilities, Geki receives the Dino Crystals and the team are able to combine their Guardian Beasts into the giant robot Daizyuzin.
7	"I Can See! I Can See!"; Transliteration: "Mieru, Mieru" (Japanese: みえる、みえる)	Shohei Tojo	Noboru Sugimura, Kenichi Araki	April 10, 1992
A new Dora Monster, Dora Goblin, steals the minds of children. Dora Goblin can only be seen by children, so the Zyurangers recruit help from a young boy to stop the monster.
8	"Terror! Eaten In An Instant"; Transliteration: "Kyōfu! Shunkan Kui" (Japanese: 恐怖! 瞬間喰い)	Shohei Tojo	Noboru Sugimura	April 17, 1992
A Dora Monster steals food, causing people to turn on one another.
9	"Run! Prince of The Eggs"; Transliteration: "Hashire Tamago Ōji" (Japanese: 走れタマゴ王子)	Takeshi Ogasawara	Noboru Sugimura	April 24, 1992
Prince Euro, a prince from an ancient kingdom, seeks out the Zyurangers to help him recover the last two dinosaur eggs in existence.
10	"Monkeys No More!"; Transliteration: "Saru wa Mō Iya!" (Japanese: 猿はもうイヤ!)	Takeshi Ogasawara	Noboru Sugimura	May 1, 1992
The Zyurangers travel to Daros Island to obtain the dinosaur eggs. However, Bandora is also seeking out the eggs.
11	"My Master!"; Transliteration: "Goshujin-sama!" (Japanese: ご主人さま!)	Katsuya Watanabe	Noboru Sugimura, Kenichi Araki	May 8, 1992
Totpat and Bookback recover an ancient lamp and use the genie inside, Gin, to defeat the Zyurangers. However, the two lose the lamp and its recovered by a group of children. Bandora destroys Gin's lamp and creates a new lamp, turning Gin into a Dora Monster. To free Gin from Bandora's control, the Zyurangers and children must put his old lamp back together.
12	"Papa's a Vampire!?"; Transliteration: "Papa wa Kyūketsuki!?" (Japanese: パパは吸血鬼!?)	Shohei Tojo	Susumu Takaku	May 15, 1992
Dan befriends a young tomboy, Michi, who wants her policeman father to become a detective. Bandora's newest monster, Dora Argus, makes Michi think her father is a vampire through hallucinations.
13	"Fire! The Golden Arrow"; Transliteration: "Ute! Ōgon no Ya" (Japanese: 射て! 黄金の矢)	Shohei Tojo	Naruhisa Arakawa	May 22, 1992
Bandora uses a monster that will turn children into apples so she can gain their youth. Mei's arrow is the only thing that can destroy the monster, but she is placed under a sleep spell by the witch.
14	"Become Small!"; Transliteration: "Chiisaku Naare!" (Japanese: 小さくなァれ!)	Shohei Tojo	Noboru Sugimura	May 29, 1992
A young boy that is constantly scolded by his mother and teacher teams up with a dwarf that uses magic bottles to shrink things.
15	"Destroy! The Dark Super Sword"; Transliteration: "Yabure! Ankoku Chō Ken" (Japanese: 破れ! 暗黒超剣)	Taro Sakamoto	Noboru Sugimura	June 5, 1992
Goushi mentors a cowardly young boy to teach him courage. Bandora kidnaps the boy to help her create the legendary sword Durandal.
16	"The Great Sneeze Plot"; Transliteration: "Kushami Dai Sakusen" (Japanese: クシャミ大作戦)	Taro Sakamoto	Susumu Takaku	June 12, 1992
A boy named Isamu becomes frustrated after being kicked off his soccer team. A Dora Monster disguised as a clown tricks the boy into kicking soccer balls that are filled with a virus that causes people to sneeze uncontrollably.
17	"The Sixth Hero!"; Transliteration: "Rokuninme no Hīrō" (Japanese: 六人目の英雄(ヒーロー))	Shohei Tojo	Noboru Sugimura	June 19, 1992
Gnome's grandson, Ryota, steals a green key that will unlock the tomb of Burai, a legendary warrior from the time of the Zyurangers. Gnome and Barza do not want Burai to be reawakened and try to stop Ryota. Ryota successfully unlocks the tomb and sets Burai free. Burai transforms into the Dragon Ranger and enters Daizyuzin, but forces the Zyurangers out and starts to fight them.
18	"The Hate-Filled Brother's Sword"; Transliteration: "Nikushimi no Kyōdai Ken" (Japanese: 憎しみの兄弟剣)	Shohei Tojo	Noboru Sugimura	June 26, 1992
Geki learns that Burai is his older brother, with the former having been adopted by the king and queen of the Yamato Tribe. Their birth father led a rebellion against the king but was killed, causing Burai to become resentful of Geki. Bandora suggests Burai team up with her to defeat the Zyurangers and gives him access to the sword Hellfriede. Geki confronts Burai, but refuses to fight his brother. Burai is about to kill Geki, but Daizyuzin appears and drives Burai off.
19	"Female Warrior Scorpion!"; Transliteration: "Onna Senshi Sasori!" (Japanese: 女戦士サソリ!)	Takeshi Ogasawara	Noboru Sugimura	July 3, 1992
Bandora summons Grifforzar's wife Lamy to retrieve the dinosaur eggs after two brothers discover them in the ocean. With help from Lamy and Burai, Bandora steals the eggs and claims she has everything she needs in order to destroy Daizyuzin.
20	"Daizyuzin's Last Day"; Transliteration: "Daijūjin Saigo no Hi" (Japanese: 大獣神最期の日)	Takeshi Ogasawara	Noboru Sugimura	July 10, 1992
A giant Grifforzar attacks Tokyo in order to force the Zyurangers to use Daizyuzin. The Zyurangers eventually summon Daizyuzin after Bandora's forces threaten to destroy the eggs using a bus filled with children. Barza reveals that a total eclipse is approaching and that Daizyuzin will be weakened as it draws its power from the sun. Daizyuzin tries to fight off Grifforzar, Lamy and Burai all at once, but is ultimately defeated.
21	"The Guardian Beast's Great Riot"; Transliteration: "Shugojū Ōabare" (Japanese: 守護獣大あばれ)	Shohei Tojo	Noboru Sugimura	July 17, 1992
Burai is driven out of Bandora's palace after he turns on her. Burai meets the Spirit of Life, Clotho, who takes him to a chamber where he will not age, but can only live outside of the room for 30 hours. Clotho gives Burai the dagger Zyusouken, which also acts as a flute that summons the Guardian Beast Dragon Caesar. Burai summons Dragon Caesar and has it attack the city, with Geki finding the resolve to finally fight his brother. Seeing the destruction, Bandora summons Grifforzar and Lamy to fight Dragon Caesar, fearing that Burai will take control of Earth for himself.
22	"Combine! Gouryuzin"; Transliteration: "Gattai! Gōryūjin" (Japanese: 合体! 剛龍神)	Shohei Tojo	Noboru Sugimura	July 24, 1992
Barza prays to the gods of the Guardian Beasts to stop Dragon Caesar and Bandora's forces. The Guardian Beasts are resurrected and Grifforzar and Lamy retreat as Tyrannosaurus fights Dragon Caesar one on one. Geki and Burai fight, with Geki emerging victorious. The Guardian Beasts then form Daizyuzin on their own, who tells Geki he must kill Burai. Geki refuses and Burai apologizes for his hatred towards his brother, which causes Hellfriede to turn into dust. With the evil in his heart gone, Burai joins the Zyurangers and Daizyuzin reveals that Dragon Caesar can combine with the other Guardian Beasts to form Gouryuzin.
23	"The Knuckleball of Infatuation"; Transliteration: "Suki Suki Chō Makyū" (Japanese: 好きすき超魔球)	Taro Sakamoto	Noboru Sugimura	July 31, 1992
A Dora Monster causes people to fall in love with the first thing they see.
24	"Hope Springs A-Turtle"; Transliteration: "Kame de Mannen" (Japanese: カメでまんねん)	Taro Sakamoto	Naruhisa Arakawa	August 7, 1992
Totpat and Bookback create a Dora Monster that causes Boi to be stuck in an endless run.
25	"The Park Where Demons Dwell"; Transliteration: "Akuma no Sumu Kōen" (Japanese: 悪魔のすむ公園)	Keita Amemiya	Susumu Takaku	August 14, 1992
Bandora creates a Dora Monster disguised as a statue that causes children to be stricken with a sleep disease.
26	"Be Careful of Shaved Ice"; Transliteration: "Kakigōri ni Goyōjin" (Japanese: カキ氷にご用心)	Keita Amemiya	Toshiki Inoue	August 21, 1992
Totpat creates a poison and puts it into the rangers' shaved ice. Mei and Dan eat the poisoned shaved ice and turn into delinquents.
27	"I Want to Eat Mei"; Transliteration: "Mei o Tabetai" (Japanese: メイを食べたい)	Shohei Tojo	Kyoko Sagiyama	August 28, 1992
The Zyurangers must fight a monster called DoraGuzzler who loves to eat flowers. Only Mei holds the key to defeating him.
28	"Great Upgrade! Clay Monsters"; Transliteration: "Dai Kaizō! Nengo Jū" (Japanese: 大改造! 粘土獣)	Shohei Tojo	Noboru Sugimura	September 4, 1992
Dan gets a part-time job working at a noodle restaurant, but strange incidents including earthquakes, a cockroach infestation and a strange red gas threaten everything.
29	"A Mystery!? The Attacking Beast Knight God"; Transliteration: "Nazo!? Osou Jūkishin" (Japanese: 謎!? 襲う獣騎神)	Shohei Tojo	Noboru Sugimura	September 11, 1992
Burai is mysteriously released and is sent with Geki to open a secret chest that may help the Zyurangers defeat Bandora's new powerful monsters.
30	"Satan Comes!!"; Transliteration: "Satan ga Kuru!!" (Japanese: サタンが来る!!)	Takeshi Ogasawara	Noboru Sugimura	September 18, 1992
Bandora's minions erect a mysterious white pillar in the city, but the Zyurangers don't know what it is for. Meanwhile, Bandora herself is busy trying to summon the great monster Satan. For this, she needs to kidnap a number of children to be sacrificed. During the night, Lamy and her soldiers place special cards on local residents houses. This allows Bandora to appear in reflections of water and mirrors to take the children. The Zyurangers must find a way to stop her plan.
31	"Reborn! The Ultimate God"; Transliteration: "Fukkatsu! Kyūkyoku no Kami" (Japanese: 復活! 究極の神)	Takeshi Ogasawara	Noboru Sugimura	September 25, 1992
Great Satan has been revived and merges with Franken to form a new monster, SatanFranken. Burai again returns with Dragon Caesar to help the Zyurangers and DaiZyuJin. However, SatanFranken defeats them easily with a 'metal-dissolving acid'. All six rangers are then mysteriously teleported away to Burai's home world, where 'time stands still'. A ghostly, child-like entity calling itself 'Clotho, the Spirit of Life' appears, telling them Burai only has 15 hours left to live. Clotho sends them to resurrect Ultimate DaiZyuJin, a more complete form of DaiZyuJin, who fought Great Satan before and may be to able to defeat him again.
32	"Geki! Kill Your Tears"; Transliteration: "Geki yo Namida o Kire" (Japanese: ゲキよ涙を斬れ)	Katsuya Watanabe	Naruhisa Arakawa	October 2, 1992
33	"Teach Me! The Jewel of Bravery"; Transliteration: "Oshiete! Yūkidama" (Japanese: 教えて! 勇気玉)	Katsuya Watanabe	Kyoko Sagiyama	October 9, 1992
34	"Stay Alive, Burai!"; Transliteration: "Burai Ikite!" (Japanese: ブライ生きて!)	Taro Sakamoto	Noboru Sugimura	October 16, 1992
35	"Ninja Warrior, Boi"; Transliteration: "Ninja Senshi Bōi" (Japanese: 忍者戦士ボーイ)	Taro Sakamoto	Susumu Takaku	October 23, 1992
36	"Smash It! The Mirror of Death"; Transliteration: "Kudake! Shi no Kagami" (Japanese: くだけ! 死の鏡)	Shohei Tojo	Noboru Sugimura	October 30, 1992
37	"A Dinosaur is Born"; Transliteration: "Kyōryū ga Umareru" (Japanese: 恐竜が生まれる)	Takeshi Ogasawara	Noboru Sugimura	November 6, 1992
38	"Princess Mei's Seven Metamorphoses!!"; Transliteration: "Mei-hime Shichihenge!!" (Japanese: メイ姫七変化!!)	Shohei Tojo	Naruhisa Arakawa	November 13, 1992
39	"Tears of a Subterranean Beast"; Transliteration: "Chitei Jū no Namida..." (Japanese: 地底獣の涙…)	Takeshi Ogasawara	Susumu Takaku	November 20, 1992
40	"Burai's Deathly Departure"; Transliteration: "Burai Shi no Tabidachi" (Japanese: ブライ死の出発(たびだち))	Shohei Tojo	Noboru Sugimura	November 27, 1992
41	"Blaze, Burai!!"; Transliteration: "Moe yo Burai!" (Japanese: 燃えよブライ!)	Shohei Tojo	Noboru Sugimura	December 4, 1992
42	"Burai Dies!"; Transliteration: "Burai Shisu..." (Japanese: ブライ死す…)	Shohei Tojo	Noboru Sugimura	December 11, 1992
43	"Live Again, Zyusouken!"; Transliteration: "Yomigaere! Jūsōken" (Japanese: 甦れ! 獣奏剣)	Taro Sakamoto	Naruhisa Arakawa	December 18, 1992
44	"Japan's Best Swordswoman"; Transliteration: "Onna Kenshi! Nippon Ichi" (Japanese: 女剣士! 日本一)	Taro Sakamoto	Naruhisa Arakawa	December 25, 1992
45	"The Foolish Boy"; Transliteration: "Bakayarō Shōnen" (Japanese: バカヤロー少年)	Takeshi Ogasawara	Susumu Takaku	January 8, 1993
46	"Presenting the Vicious Squadron!"; Transliteration: "Sanjō! Kyōaku Sentai" (Japanese: 参上! 凶悪戦隊)	Takeshi Ogasawara	Naruhisa Arakawa	January 15, 1993
47	"Break In! The Final Deciding Battle"; Transliteration: "Totsunyū! Saishū Kessen" (Japanese: 突入! 最終決戦)	Katsuya Watanabe	Noboru Sugimura	January 22, 1993
48	"The Son from Darkness"; Transliteration: "Yami Kara no Musuko" (Japanese: 闇からの息子)	Katsuya Watanabe	Noboru Sugimura	January 29, 1993
49	"The Gods Lost!!"; Transliteration: "Kami ga Maketa!!" (Japanese: 神が負けた!!)	Shohei Tojo	Noboru Sugimura	February 5, 1993
50	"Long Live the Dinosaurs!!"; Transliteration: "Kyōryū Banzai!" (Japanese: 恐竜万歳!)	Shohei Tojo	Noboru Sugimura	February 12, 1993

== Songs ==
Opening theme

- "Kyōryū Sentai Zyuranger" (恐竜戦隊ジュウレンジャー, Kyōryū Sentai Jūrenjā)
  - Lyrics: Gōji Tsuno & Reo Rinozuka
  - Composition: Gōji Tsuno
  - Arrangement: Kenji Yamamoto
  - Artist: Kenta Satō

Ending theme

- "Bōken-shite Rappa-peeya!" (冒険してラッパピーヤ!, Bōken-shite Rappapīya; "Let's Go On Adventures, Rappa-peeya!")
  - Lyrics & Composition: Gōji Tsuno
  - Arrangement: Kenji Yamamoto
  - Artist: Pythagoras (ピタゴラス, Pitagorasu)
    Mecha themes
    - "Daizyuzin No Uta" (大獣神のうた "Daizyuzin's Song")
      - Artist: Ju-project
    - "Dragon Caesar No Uta" (ドラゴンシーザーのうた Doragon Shīzā no uta, "Dragon Caesar's Song")
      - Artist: Funky Y.K.
    Insert themes
    - "Kibou No Tsurugi" (希望の剣 Kibō No Tsurugi, "Sword of Hope")
      - Artist: Tomomi Hiraishi (平石豊 茂美 Hiraishi Tomomi)
    - "Tyrannoranger ~Akaki Yuushi~" (ティラノレンジャー・「赤き勇姿」 Tiranorenjā "Akaki Yūshi", "Tyrannoranger -The Crimson Hero-")
      - Artist: Tomomi Hiraishi (平石豊 茂美 Hiraishi Tomomi)
    - "Yumemiru Otome No Chikara Kobu" (夢見る乙女の力こぶ "The Strength of a Dreaming Maiden")
      - Artist: Sayuri Saito (斉藤 小百合 Saitō Sayuri)
    - "Shippo Piki Piki" (しっぽ Piki Piki)
      - Artist: Kenta Satou (佐藤 健太 Satō Kenta)
    - "Pop Up Night" (ポップアップナイト Poppu Appu Naito)
      - Artist: Takeshi Ike (池 毅 Ike Takeshi)
    Character theme
    - "Dolla! ~Majo Bandora Theme~" (Dolla!~魔女バンドーラのテーマ~ Dora! !Majo Bandōra no Tēma~, "Dolla! ~Witch Bandora's Theme~")
      - Artist: Bandora / Machiko Soga (曽我町子 Soga Machiko)

== International broadcast and home video ==
- In its home country of Japan, this was the next series in the franchise to be given a full home video release after the success of Chōjin Sentai Jetman. It was released on VHS (both Sale/Rental) from April 1993 until February 1994 and spread across 11 volumes. The first seven volumes contain four episodes each. Volumes 8 and 9 contain 5 episodes, and the final two volumes contain 6 episodes. It was also released on Laserdisc from November 25, 1993 until January 25, 1994, as it was cancelled after two volumes were released, with each having four episodes. From September 21, 2010 until January 21, 2011, the series was released on DVD for the first time spreading through five volumes, with each one containing ten episodes each. On November 9, 2022, to commemorate the 30th anniversary of the series' premiere, a collection set to spread through two volumes was released with the both volumes having 25 episodes.
- International distribution towards all future Super Sentai seasons would be limited to a few neighboring Asian regions starting with this series since then, as most regions around the world would receive foreign language dubs of the American adaptation based on this series, which was Mighty Morphin Power Rangers. Although, Japan did release the first 100 episodes of the Power Rangers adaptation dubbed, but despite high ratings the rest was not dubbed. South Korea only aired a dub of the first season due to the belief that the attention span of Korean kids was too short to keep up with a multiseason show. Thailand, Taiwan, Hong Kong, Indonesia, Malaysia and The Philippines also aired the Power Rangers adaptation dubbed in their languages as well.
  - In Thailand, four different Thai dubs have been confirmed to exist for Zyuranger. The original Thai dub was licensed by Toon Town Entertainment for Channel 9 (now 9MCOT) in 1994, a second dub was licensed by Video Square, A third dub was released around 2006/2007 by Cartoon Inter Company Limited for VCD release and spread across 25 VCDs, and a fourth dub was released by the Cartoon Club Channel for YouTube.
  - In Hong Kong, the series aired as Dinosaur Team (恐龙战队, Kǒnglóng Zhànduì) with a Cantonese Chinese dub on TVB Jade from July 9, 1994 to July 1, 1995, with all 50 episodes dubbed. The Cantonese dub of the Power Rangers adaptation would be released as New Dinosaur Team (新恐龙战队, Xin Kǒnglóng Zhànduì).
  - In Indonesia, Zyuranger did not air at all. But its American adaptation Mighty Morphin Power Rangers did air with an Indonesian dub in its place. However, the next series Dairanger would air afterwards with a dub there, under "Star Ranger." (Not to be confused with the English title for Gorenger's release in the Philippines).
- In North America, the series was released on DVD by Shout! Factory presented with the original Japanese audio with English subtitles on February 17, 2015. This was the very first Super Sentai series to get an official release in its unadapted Power Rangers form. The series is also available for streaming on Tubi along with many other Sentai series until 2026.

== Video game ==
A Kyōryū Sentai Zyuranger video game was released in Japan for the Family Computer by Angel (a subsidiary of Bandai) on November 6, 1992. It is a side-scrolling action game in which the player takes control of a different Zyuranger in each of the game's five stages. The game includes two difficulty settings and a password feature.

The player begins the game as Boi in the first stage, followed by Mei, Dan, Goushi, and Geki in subsequent stages. Each Zyuranger begins his or her stage wielding the standard Ranger Gun, which can be replaced with the character's corresponding Legendary Weapon by finding the entrance to Barza's room in each stage. Each stage also contains ten scattered coins which will replenish the player's life gauge completely when fully collected, as well as display a still of the character's mecha and its specifications. At the end of each stage, the player will confront one of the main villains from the show. The villains faced are Pleprechuan, Bookback, Totpat, Grifforzar and Bandora herself.

Between stages, the player will be challenged to one of three possible minigames by Burai the Dragonranger. These consist of a trivia game where Bandora will ask the player a question related to the TV series, a Pong-style game between Daizyuzin and the Dragon Caesar, and a hot potato-style game between Gouryuzin and Lamy. These minigames are also accessible from the main menu and can be played with a second player.

The series itself is also included in the Mobile game Super Robot Wars X-Ω as a limited-time event, making it the first Tokusatsu series to debut in a Super Robot Wars game.
