= Sachio Yamashita =

Japanese-American artist

Sachio Yamashita (1933–2009) was a Japanese-American artist primarily known as the creator of more than 100 public murals throughout the Midwest between 1968 and 1982, and later as an abstract painter and muralist in the San Francisco Bay Area. As a muralist, Yamashita identified as an "environmental" artist "who creates, or alters environments." Chicago art historian Rebecca Zorach observes that Yamashita "showed how murals could be understood not just as community-based art but as huge environmental installations, breaking free from the gallery, changing city dweller's consciousness."

== Early life ==
Yamashita was born in Kagoshima, Kagoshima Prefecture, Japan in 1933 and immigrated to the United States in 1968. Living in Japan during World War II, he attended elementary school in a bomb shelter as warplanes could be heard overhead. He began drawing at an early age, covering the walls of his childhood home. As a young man, he was a cartoonist for local publications like the Nishinippon Shimbun newspaper, where he often expressed his political views. In a 1976 interview with People Magazine, he claimed to have first traveled to the U.S. as a journalist covering the 1968 Democratic Convention. Earlier newspaper profiles of Yamashita, however, state that the initial purpose of his visit was to teach East Asian spatial design at Prairie State College. Accounts of his life in Japan and his initial months in the U.S. vary, depending on the information he gave reporters. Rebecca Zorach notes that he received advanced training in art while living in Tokyo. He eventually settled in Chicago and quickly became part of a tight-knit circle of artists who sought to beautify the city with public art.

== Midwest murals ==
=== Chicago ===
When Yamashita arrived in Chicago in the late 1960s, he was struck by the vast potential of the city for public art. "The whole city is my canvas," he told Time Magazine in 1976. Within a year of arriving from Japan, Yamashita worked alongside an activist group known as CVL, Inc ("Conservative Vice Lords), a former street gang from Chicago's West Side, at a community-focused non-profit art center called Art & Soul in the North Lawndale neighborhood of the city. The art space was affiliated with Chicago's Museum of Contemporary Art. Enlisting volunteers from the neighborhood, Yamashita painted his "Rainbow" mural (1969), which covered the front and side exterior walls of its one-story storefront building.

According to Rebecca Zorach, rainbow stripes were his signature motif in the late 1960s and early 1970s. For example, he painted the exterior of Chicago's famed Billy Goat's Tavern, located at 430 North Michigan Ave, in thin rainbow stripes after agreeing to produce the mural in exchange for beer and food. The Billy Goat Tavern mural was removed with the exception of small sections in the shape of leaping goats near the entrance of the building. On Michigan Ave, he painted the exteriors of seven underground storefronts in his rainbow color scheme. In addition to his stated goal of transforming Chicago's urban landscape with color, he proposed converting the city's elevated train tracks into sprawling bike paths.

In addition to covering the walls of playgrounds, commercial buildings, parking garages, and other public spaces he sought to cover every water tower in Chicago with his bright palette, each painted in a single hue and numbered in sequential order. Although he intended to paint 1,000 water towers in the city, upon leaving the Midwest for the San Francisco Bay Area, he had covered no more than a dozen. According to Chicago historian Tim Samuelson, Yamashita's stated goal was to paint a public work every day. He would regularly approach the owners of buildings with water towers, sometimes convincing them to pay for the supplies. On hot days, Samuelson notes, Yamashita would swim in the water towers to cool down. The first towers in his series were painted red and royal blue over Piper's Alley and numbered 1 and 2. Other towers were painted vibrant colors such as purple, blue-green, yellow, and bright orange. The water tower series was part of his broader "Environment Art for Everywhere" project and was partially funded by a grant from the National Endowment for the Arts in cooperation with the Museum of Contemporary Art, Chicago. When interviewed by the Chicago Tribune in 1971 during the initial stage of his project, Yamashita declared, "The whole city is my studio, where I paint only bright, peaceful things." Although he received institutional and municipal support, at times he would act without permission and cover additional surfaces such as stop signs and no parking signs, much to the dismay of city officials.

One of his most well-known murals is based on a Japanese woodblock print by ukiyo-e artist Hiroshige depicting Mount Fuji and massive waves, which he painted on the facade of a three story hardware store at the corner of North Avenue and Wieland Street. "The Wave" (1971) mural has since been removed.

By 1980, it was estimated that Yamashita had painted more than 20 large-scale murals in Chicago, largely focusing on the lower Michigan Ave area of the city In addition to his signature rainbow patterns, he created "super graphic" works, large-scale illusionist murals that appear to transform space with geometric compositions. His celebrated super graphic work "Balance of Power," which was located along lower Wacker Drive, appears as the backdrop in a portion of the iconic final car chase scene in the 1980 film The Blues Brothers. More recently, "Balance of Power" and other notable Chicago murals by Yamashita were discussed on the WTTW segment "Ask Geoffrey" in the episode "What Became of Artist Behind These 1970s Murals," which first aired on December 12, 2018.

=== Greater Midwest ===
Profiles in Time and People magazines in the mid 1970s in addition to regular coverage of his work in the Chicago Tribune and other regional newspapers inspired more municipalities and businesses to commission Yamashita for murals across the Midwest. In Neligh, Nebraska he was invited to propose a mural design for the town auditorium. Completed in 1977, "The Good Earth" occupied two walls of the building and was sponsored by the Neligh Arts Council. Dubbed "the Blue Cow" mural, it depicted a cow and calf in a prairie scene flanked by a vertical rainbow and a plow, sun, and ear of corner on another side of the building. Only a portion of the mural remains, having been painted over despite the fact that it was restored in 1994. In 1980, the Neligh City Council and Park Board commissioned him to paint a mural on the exterior of its new community swimming pool. Working with a local team, Yamashita painted a rainbow colored whale on the southern wall and a corresponding hardedge pattern on the eastern side of the aquatic center building. The swimming pool mural remains intact.

While Yamashita was a widely popular public artist in the Midwest, many of his murals later suffered at the hands of developers who painted over or covered his designs in the process of renovations or expansions. In 1981, for example, he was invited to Salina, Kansas as an artist-in-residence in order to create a mural for the south side of the First National Bank and Company building. The project was sponsored by the Salina Arts Commission and received much local fanfare, including the praise of the bank president, who favorably cited his homage to local farmers. "Golden Wave" was inspired by the surrounding Kansas landscape and depicted an abstracted scene of wheat fields and grain elevators under a vivid blue sky and radiant sun. Only six years later, the mural was covered by the bank when it sought to replace the facade of the building for "aesthetic purposes". Yamashita's residency also included his participation in the town's annual Smoky Hill River Festival, during which he painted a giant abstract sunflower on a municipal pool turned ice skating rink in Oakdale Park. The mural covered an area of about 7,000 square feet. Locals were invited to assist the painter with his project. The mural fell into disrepair and by 2012 a new commissioned work by Brooklyn based artist Molly Dilworth was installed.

== Public collections ==
- Sacramento Convention Center
- Fine Arts Museums of San Francisco
- Hallie Ford Museum of Art, Willamette University, Salem, Oregon
- Oakland Museum of California
- University of Oregon, Eugene
