= Samurai Shodown II =

1994 video game

- Developers: SNK; Kinesoft (Note: Additional work by NuFX) (Windows)
- Publishers: SNK: Windows; JP: GameBank; NA: Interplay Entertainment; PAL: Gamesload; BRA: Digerati Games
- Producer: Eikichi Kawasaki
- Designer: Yasushi Adachi (K. Y. Hayate)
- Composers: Yasumasa Yamada; Yasuo Yamate
- Series: Samurai Shodown
- Platform: Arcade: Microsoft Windows, Neo Geo AES, Neo Geo CD, PlayStation
- Release: October 28, 1994: Arcade; WW: October 28, 1994 Neo Geo AES; WW: December 2, 1994 Neo Geo CD; JP/NA: December 15, 1994 Windows; JP: 1996; NA: May 14, 1999; BRA: 1999 PlayStation; JP: March 26, 1998
- Genre: Fighting
- Modes: Single-player, multiplayer
- Arcade system: Neo Geo MVS

Samurai Shodown II (Note: Known in Japan as Shin Samurai Spirits: Haohmaru Jigokuhen (真サムライスピリッツ覇王丸地獄変, Shin Samurai Supirittsu: Haōmaru Jigokuhen; lit. True Samurai Spirits - Haohmaru's Portrait of Hell)) is a 1994 fighting game developed and published by SNK for the Neo Geo arcade and home platforms. It is the second entry in the Samurai Shodown series. It was ported to a series of home consoles.

Samurai Shodown II was well received and is considered one of the best fighting games of all time.

== Gameplay ==
Gameplay screenshot showcasing a match between Cham Cham and Genjuro Kibagami

Following up on the extremely enthusiastic fan reception of the first Samurai Shodown game, SNK rebuilt the sequel from the ground up, including almost all of its predecessor's cast, adding several new characters, and refining the overall gameplay with more responsive control, more moves (particularly the use of the POW meter as a super special move meter; these moves not only cause severe damage to the opponents but also break their weapons, forcing them to fight unarmed for a short interval before a replacement weapon is issued), and a substantial number of Easter eggs.

The overall gameplay was expanded to include several movement options, such as being able to roll forward and backward, ducking to avoid high attacks, or doing small hops to avoid low strikes. This game was also the first game to incorporate an offensive blocking technique or "parry", via a command issued at the last second, a player would be able to deflect the incoming attack and leave their adversary open to attack by a split second. Such a technique was later also used in Namco's Weaponlord and later popularized by Capcom's Street Fighter III. There are also cameo appearances from other SNK characters, a hidden boss who would occasionally come out to challenge players, and several other treats for fans to uncover.

== Plot ==
One year after the defeat of Amakusa from within the first Samurai Shodown, a new threat soon emerges in the form of Mizuki Rashojin: a vengeful spirit who possess a local shrine priestess named Mizuki and seeks to bring forth chaos and destruction to the world in the name of the dark god Ambrosia's will. Those who had fought before in the past during Amakusa's reign of terror now find themselves, along with a few new faces, battling against Mizuki and her loyal forces in order to determine the fate of the entire world itself.

== Characters ==
With the exception of Tam Tam and Amakusa, the remaining cast of the original Samurai Shodown return for the sequel, being joined by six new warriors:

- Genjuro Kibagami - a cruel and merciless swordsman who is Haohmaru's greatest rival.
- Cham Cham - a young cat-like girl who is the younger sister of Tam Tam (who was transformed into her pet chimpanzee Paku Paku as divine punishment for losing and failing to protect his village's two sacred stones from Mizuki and her loyal forces).
- Neinhalt Sieger - a noble and valiant knight from Prussia who fights with a giant gun-containing gauntlet.
- Nicotine Caffeine - an old diminutive monk who serves as the wise master of Haohmaru and Genjuro.
- Kuroko - the background referee who serves as a hidden boss of the game. Kuroko's move-list is interesting as he uses moves that are used by some of the characters in the game as well as characters from other SNK fighters such as Ryo Sakazaki and Tung Fu Rue. His super move in the game is a comical version of Ryo's Ryuko Ranbu.
- Mizuki Rashojin - a vengeful spirit who desires to carry out Ambrosia's will in bringing forth chaos and destruction to the world. Mizuki is the first female final boss in the series and the only boss to have assistance from an animal (a dog-like demon named Maju who serves as both Mizuki's personal pet and guardian).

== Release ==
Samurai Shodown II was originally released for the Neo Geo arcades and home consoles in 1994. In spite of its considerable popularity, the game went for several years without being released on any other system in the west except for PC. In 1996, a port of the Neo Geo CD version for Windows-based PCs was released in Japan. The North American version of this was released in 1999. It was ported to the PlayStation only for the Japanese market in 1998, in the form of the Samurai Spirits Kenkaku Shinan Pack (Note: Japanese: (サムライスピリッツ剣客指南パック)) (combines the first two games into one package). As with the original Samurai Shodown, the Neo Geo AES version censors all blood in the game. However, Samurai Shodown II also includes a "blood code" to enable all blood; SNK provided this code to gaming magazines for publication and to those who called their customer service department.

However, later, an official Xbox Live Arcade port and a PlayStation 2/Wii anthology containing every Samurai Shodown game was announced at the Tokyo Game Show 2007. It was released on Xbox Live Arcade for Xbox 360 on September 10, 2008, and on the Wii's Virtual Console in Europe on August 8, 2008, and in North America on August 25, 2008. On December 18, 2012, SNK Playmore released the game on the onboard memory of the Neo Geo X portable console. It was also ported for iOS and Android platforms and released on iOS App Store and Google Play in June 2013.

A digital PC version of Samurai Shodown II with Neo Geo emulation was bundled with many other SNK Playmore Neo Geo emulated ports and released on the Humble Bundle store on December 8, 2015. Though the browser version of some of these games including this one played a bit too fast in the emulated software window, they had Steam client versions available. This game and many others in the Neo Geo 25th Anniversary bundle that were on Humble Bundle were later released for DRM-free download on GOG.com on May 31, 2017. Hamster Corporation re-released the game as part of their ACA Neo Geo series for the PlayStation 4, Xbox One, Nintendo Switch, Windows, Android and iOS.

== Reception ==
Reception

Aggregate score
Aggregator	Score
Metacritic	X360: 72/100 iOS: 57/100

Review scores
Publication	Score
Electronic Gaming Monthly	Neo Geo: 36/40
Famitsu	Neo Geo: 34/40
GamePro	Neo Geo: 5/5
IGN	Wii: 8.5/10; X360: 8/10
Next Generation	Arcade: 4/5; Neo Geo: 3/5
TouchArcade	iOS: 2.5/5

=== Commercial ===
In North America, RePlay reported it to be the 12th most-popular arcade game in October 1994, despite only being available for location testing at the time. In Japan, Game Machine listed it on their December 1, 1994 issue as being the most-successful table arcade unit of the month. It went on to be Japan's eighth highest-grossing arcade game of 1995.

According to Famitsu, both the Neo Geo AES and Neo Geo CD versions sold over 75,066 and 20,487 copies during their first week on the Japanese market, respectively. The AES version went on to sell 205,554 units and the CD version 129,951 units, for a total of 335,505 units sold in Japan.

=== Critical ===
Samurai Shodown II was well received by critics and considered an improvement over the original. The four reviewers of EGM gave the Neo Geo home version unanimous scores of 9/10 each and the "Game of the Month" title, saying that the game improved in every aspect over its already excellent predecessor. They later ranked it #4 in the 1995 EGM's "Hot 50", higher than any other fighting game. GamePro praised improvements such as the revised POW meter and secret moves as well as "the best graphics ever seen in a hand-drawn animated fighting game" but said the combos are still unbalanced, with some characters able to do far more damage than others. They remarked that, in combination with other recent releases such as Fatal Fury Special, SNK was close to overtaking Capcom as the premier maker of fighting games. A reviewer for Next Generation said that the game was the same as its predecessor aside from some "minor improvements", but that "that's what makes it so darn good."

Samurai Shodown II made GameSpot's list of the greatest games of all time and EGM's list of top ten cult classics. It was also ranked as the 18th best arcade game of the 1990s by Complex. Retro Gamer included it among top ten Neo Geo games: "With its beautiful graphics, silky smooth animation and eclectic character roster, the second part of SNKs Samurai Shodown series is easily its best. The 202-meg cart featured new fighters, glorious backdrops and even slicker controls than the impressive original. A massive arcade success, Samurai Shodown II was a fantastic two-fingered salute to Capcom and proved that SNKs style and ambition knew no bounds. It certainly lacks the depth of later games in the series, but for sheer fun and accessibility Samurai Shodown II is without equal. A truly monumental fighter that still plays brilliantly today." In 2008, they gave the XBLA re-release a review score of 91%. In 2019, Game Informer ranked it as the 9th best fighting game of all time.

According to Retro Gamer, "this incredible game proved that SNK was willing and able to challenge genre conventions and go toe to toe with Capcom in the fighting game arena. The heated competition between the two companies would last through the decade and beyond as both companies tried to out-innovate each other with each new release." The game's awkward Engrish text intro has often been commented on. Chad Okada (Game Lord) stated that efforts to localize the text were stunted as the small profit earned from Neo Geo home versions was not considered worth the time and money needed to fix translation errors.

Next Generation reviewed the Neo-Geo version of the game and stated that "Unfortunately, even in its full arcade reproduction, Samurai Showdown II is still just another fighting game. It's definitely a game every Neo-Geo owner should invest in, but not a reason to buy a machine if you don't own one."
