= Michinori Yamashita =

Japanese mathematician (born 1953)

Michinori Yamashita (born 1953 in Japan) is a Japanese mathematician and professor at Rissho University. He studied at Sophia University under Yukiyoshi Kawada and Kiiti Morita.
