= Samurai Shodown (1993 video game) =

1993 video game

- Arcade flyer
- Developer: SNK (Note: Game Boy and Game Gear versions developed by Takara; SNES version developed by Monolith Corp.; Mega Drive/Genesis versions developed by Saurus and System Vision; Sega CD version developed by Funcom; 3DO version developed by Crystal Dynamics.)
- Publishers: SNK: Game Boy, Game Gear, Super NES Takara Sega CD; NA/EU: JVC Musical Industries; BRA: Tectoy 3DO; JP/EU: BMG Interactive; NA: Crystal Dynamics Mega Drive/Genesis; JP/EU: Sega; NA: Takara FM Towns; JP: Japan Home Video
- Producers: Eikichi Kawasaki; Tomoaki Fukui
- Designer: Yasushi Adachi
- Artists: Erina Makino; Keisen Yamaguchi; Kenji Shintani
- Composers: Masahiko Hataya; Yasuo Yamate
- Series: Samurai Shodown
- Platform: Arcade: Neo Geo AES, 3DO, Game Boy, Neo Geo CD, Super NES, Game Gear, Mega Drive/Genesis, Sega CD, FM Towns, PlayStation
- Release: July 7, 1993: Arcade; JP: July 7, 1993; NA: July 1993 Neo Geo AES; JP/NA: August 11, 1993 3DO; NA/EU: 1994; JP: 1995 Game Boy; JP: June 30, 1994; NA: November 1994; EU: 1994 Neo Geo CD; JP: September 9, 1994; NA: October 1996 Super NES; NA: September 14, 1994; JP: September 22, 1994; EU: 1994 Game Gear; NA: November 6, 1994; JP: December 9, 1994 Mega Drive/Genesis; JP: November 19, 1994; NA: November 1994; EU: February 1995 Sega CD; NA: January 1995; PAL/BRA: June 1996 FM Towns; JP: September 1995 PlayStation; JP: March 26, 1998
- Genre: Fighting
- Modes: Single-player, multiplayer
- Arcade system: Neo Geo MVS

Samurai Shodown (Note: Known in Japan as Samurai Spirits (サムライスピリッツ, Samurai Supirittsu)) is a 1993 fighting game developed and published by SNK for the Neo Geo arcade and home platforms. It is the first installment in the Samurai Shodown series. In contrast to most fighting games at the time, which were set in the modern age and focused primarily on hand-to-hand combat, Samurai Shodown takes place in feudal-era Japan (similar to Kaneko's Shogun Warriors that was released the year prior). It was SNK's first arcade fighting game to focus primarily on weapon-based combat.

Samurai Shodown was a commercial success, becoming Japan's sixth highest-grossing arcade game of 1993 and one of America's top five highest-grossing arcade conversion kits of 1994. It won several Game of the Year awards from Gamest, Electronic Gaming Monthly and the European Computer Trade Show. Samurai Shodown then appeared on other platforms, including the Takara-published Super NES, Sega Genesis, Game Boy and Game Gear versions in 1994. It has since been re-released for various modern platforms as part of the SNK Arcade Classics Vol. 1 (2008), Samurai Shodown Anthology (2008) and Samurai Shodown NeoGeo Collection (2020) compilations, and on the Wii Virtual Console. Hamster Corporation re-released the game as part of their ACA Neo Geo series for the PlayStation 4, Xbox One, Nintendo Switch, Windows, Android and iOS.

== Gameplay ==
Gameplay screenshot showcasing a match between Haohmaru and Galford D. Weller in San Francisco

The game is set in the late 1780s, and all the characters wield weapons. The game uses music from the time period, with sounds of traditional Japanese instruments, such as the shakuhachi and shamisen. A refined version of the camera zoom first found in Art of Fighting is used in Samurai Shodown. The game includes the portrayal of blood.

The game became renowned for its fast pace. Focusing more on quick, powerful strikes than combos, the slow motion was added to intensify the damage dealt from hard hits. During a match, a referee holds flags representing each player (Player 1 is white; Player 2 is red). When a player lands a successful hit, the referee lifts the corresponding flag, indicating who dealt the blow.

A delivery man occasionally appears in the background and throws items such as bombs or health-restoring chicken, which can change the outcome.

== Plot and characters ==
Shiro Tokisada Amakusa, slain in Japan of 1638 by the forces of the Tokugawa Shogunate for his part in the Shimabara Rebellion, was resurrected in 1787 as an akuma from making a deal with the dark god Ambrosia by bringing the evil entity into the world with the Palenke stone and its energy. Driven by hatred for the Shogunate and having a nihilistic streak towards the world, he unleashes his dark powers to bring chaos to all of existence in 1788. A variety of warriors—some historic, some fictional—converge upon the source of the chaos, each driven by their own reasons.

- Haohmaru - A wandering samurai who is searching for strong opponents to hone his skills.
- Nakoruru - A young girl aided by her pet eagle, Mamahaha, who strives to protect nature.
- Ukyo Tachibana - An ailing samurai warrior who is fighting to gain a flower for his beloved; Kei Odagiri.
- Charlotte Christine de Colde - A French noblewoman who vows to protect France from Amakusa's evil.
- Galford D. Weller - An American who traveled to Japan to become a ninja. He is aided by his pet dog, Poppy.
- Jubei Yagyu - A Ronin who strives to protect Japan from its enemies.
- Earthquake - A large Texan thief who studied the art of Ninjutsu. He wishes to steal as much treasure as he can.
- Hanzo Hattori - An Iga Ninja who fights to save his son; Shinzo from Amakusa's control.
- Kyoshiro Senryo - A kabuki performer who uses his art to entertain and perfect his own fighting skills.
- Tam Tam - A warrior from the Mayan city of Green Hell, charged with retrieving the stolen Palenke stone back from Amakusa.
- Wan-Fu - A warrior from China, serving the Qing Emperor. He searches Japan for worthy fighters to help him unify his homeland.
- Genan Shiranui - A member of the Shiranui clan, killing anyone who gets in his way as he progresses through the path of evil.

Non playable characters that appear are Kuroko; a man dressed in all black who judges each match during the game and Hikyaku; a delivery man working for Amakusa who disrupts fights.

== Development ==
Samurai Shodown evolved from what was originally planned to be a traditional side-scrolling beat 'em up, featuring monsters as the dark heroes (similar to Data East's Night Slashers). However, after considering what would sell to a global audience, series-creator and director Yasushi Adachi decided that a fighting game with distinctly Japanese characters, such as samurai and ninjas, would do better. The only hold-over from the original concept was Genan Shiranui, the hunchbacked claw-handed creature that was inspired by Adachi's interest in Tim Burton's Edward Scissorhands.

The programming team for Samurai Shodown consisted of a combination of veteran SNK programmers and former Capcom employees.

The idea to spell the English title as "Shodown" rather than "Showdown" came from SNK's U.S. distributor. They felt the Japanese title "Samurai Spirits" did not adequately explain the game, and believed the spelling could be a play on the word shogun, based on the lingering popularity of the Shogun miniseries.

== Release ==
The Neo Geo AES version of the game was released for the Wii Virtual Console on October 16, 2007, in Japan; May 30, 2008, in Europe; and June 16, 2008, in North America. However, before the Virtual Console version was released in North America, the game was released as part of SNK Arcade Classics Vol. 1.

Mostly due to the negative publicity surrounding the use of violence in video games, the game was edited when it was first released for the AES as it featured blood and graphic fatal attacks that kill opponents by slicing them in half. As a result, it was decided to censor the game for most platforms by changing the blood from red to white and disabling the fatal attack animations. The win quotes were also censored, and references to death or blood were altered.

In the Super NES version, the blood was recolored orange and the fatal attacks were removed in accordance with Nintendo's guidelines.

The 3DO version was first released in 1994 in North America, then in Japan and Europe the following year, with all blood and fatality graphics intact. As a result, some retailers did not carry this edition of the game.

The censoring of the Neo Geo console version was unusual in that it was tied to the specific system. For instance, a North American cartridge running on a North American Neo Geo would display white sweat, but the same cartridge, when plugged into a Japanese Neo Geo, would run the uncensored game with blood. Neo Geo console modifications would enable users to set the system's region to Japan, or play in arcade mode, either of which would cause the game to be played with all of the blood and death animations intact, even on a North American/PAL console.

=== Version differences ===
In addition to the Neo Geo system, the AES, Samurai Shodown was ported to multiple other platforms, including the Super NES, Game Boy, Mega Drive/Genesis, Game Gear, Sega CD, Sega Saturn, 3DO, FM Towns, PlayStation and PlayStation 2. All of the cartridge versions were handled by Takara, while Crystal Dynamics ported the 3DO version, and Funcom handled the Sega CD port.

The Mega Drive/Genesis and Sega CD versions omit the character Earthquake and his stage. Both versions lack the camera zoom, and the camera is locked in a close zoom. This gives better detail to the characters, but the fighting area is smaller. In addition, some attacks were altered or removed entirely from the Mega Drive/Genesis version of the game. The final boss is playable in the two-player mode without the use of a code. The Mega Drive/Genesis version lacks the arcade introduction, instead showing the arcade version's text with no background graphics or speech. The character artwork shown after beating an opponent is also missing, and portions of some characters' endings are not present. The announcer no longer says the names of the characters before a fight or after winning a fight. The Sega CD version retains the arcade introduction and is only missing portions of some characters' endings. The Sega CD version also includes the attacks that were removed or altered in the Mega Drive/Genesis version, and the music is the same as the arcade version.

The SNES version has the character line-up intact, but with the camera zoomed out, which makes the character sprites smaller compared to the other ports. This version has all of the stages from the arcade version, and they are less restricted compared to the Mega Drive/Genesis and Sega CD ports. This version also supports Dolby Surround sound. The SNES version includes the arcade intro sequence, although the voice accompanying the text is missing. The character artwork shown after beating an opponent is present, as are the arcade endings. The announcer, like the Sega CD version, says the names of the characters before a fight and after winning a fight. The SNES version has no blood, being replaced by sweat. An exclusive mode, count down, is included in this port. Players can also use the final boss in two-player mode with a secret code.

The Game Boy version includes all the characters, stages, and most of the special moves, but has no combos, fatalities, or voices. All the music tracks are included, albeit in scaled-down form.

The Game Gear port offered only nine fighting characters to choose from (Gen-An, Galford, Haohmaru, Ukyo, Charlotte, Nakoruru, Jubei, Hanzo, and Kyoshiro), while the original (SNK arcades) version offered 12.

Unlike most early home versions, the 3DO version includes the camera zoom, as well as all the characters, special moves, and fatalities.

== Reception ==
Reception

Review scores
Publication	Score
AllGame	4/5 (SNES); 3.5/5 (Neo Geo)
Computer and Video Games	90% (Neo Geo)
Electronic Gaming Monthly	37/50 (SNES); 38/50 (3DO); 30/40 (Sega CD)
Famitsu	25/40 (3DO); 6/10, 5/10, 5/10, 5/10 (Game Boy); 8/10 (Super Famicom)
GamePro	17.5/20 (Genesis); 14/20 (SNES); 15/20 (Game Boy); 15/20 (3DO); 13.5/20 (Sega CD)
Next Generation	3/5 (Genesis); 3/5 (3DO)
Player One	94% (Mega Drive)

Awards
Publication	Award
Gamest; Grand Prize	Game of the Year, Best Fighting Game, Best Direction, Best VGM, Best Album, Best Character (Nakoruru)
Electronic Gaming Monthly	Game of the Year, Best Neo-Geo Game, Best Fighting Game
European Computer Trade Show	Game of the Year
AMOA Awards	Most Played Conversion Kit (nominee)

=== Neo Geo ===
In Japan, Game Machine listed Samurai Spirits as the most popular table arcade game of August 1993. It went on to be Japan's sixth highest-grossing arcade game of 1993. In North America, RePlay reported Samurai Shodown to be the top-performing arcade software kit from August to October 1993, and then again in December. Play Meter listed it as America's third most popular arcade game of October 1993. It went on to be one of the top five highest-grossing arcade conversion kits of 1994 in the United States.

In the February 1994 issue of Japanese magazine Gamest, Samurai Shodown was awarded Best Game of 1993 in the Seventh Annual Gamest Grand Prize; it was also the first to win in the category of Best Fighting Game (Street Fighter II Dash, the previous Game of the Year, won Best Action Game). Samurai Shodown also placed first in Best VGM, Best Album and Best Direction, and second place in Best Graphics. In the Best Characters list, Nakoruru placed No. 1, Haohmaru at No. 6, Jubei Yagyu at No. 8, a tie between Ukyo Tachibana, Galford, and Poppy at No. 11, Charlotte at No. 16 (tied with Duck King from Fatal Fury Special), Kuroko at No. 18, Tam Tam and Hanzo Hattori tied for No. 22, Gen-an Shiranui at No. 29, and Wan-Fu tied at No. 45 with five other characters.

Samurai Shodown won multiple awards from Electronic Gaming Monthly in their 1993 video game awards, including Best Neo-Geo Game, Best Fighting Game, and Game of the Year. It was awarded "Game of the Year" at the April 1994 European Computer Trade Show (ECTS).

In 1997, Electronic Gaming Monthly ranked the Neo Geo AES version number 99 on their list of the "100 Best Games of All Time", citing the solid fighting engine, realistic use of blood, and easy to execute moves.

=== Ports ===
Famicom Tsūshin gave the Super Famicom version an 8 out of 10 in their Reader Cross Review. Electronic Gaming Monthly gave the Super NES version a 37 out of 50, commenting that despite the lack of scaling, it is still a very good port.

GamePro considered the Genesis version to be superior to the Super NES version, citing the Genesis version's better scale (zoomed-in versus the zoomed-out graphics of the Super NES version) and the awkward control configuration on the Super NES version. They held the Game Boy version to be surprisingly good given the hardware, but ultimately unsatisfying, and concluded that hardcore fans should pass on even the Genesis version in favor of the upcoming 3DO and Sega CD versions. Next Generation reviewed the Genesis version of the game, rating it three stars out of five, and stated that "fans of the arcade game won't be disappointed with this solid translation, complete with blood and all the varied endings of the original."

Famicom Tsūshin scored the 3DO version of the game a 25 out of 40. Electronic Gaming Monthly scored the 3DO version 38 out of 50, calling it "A very faithful home version of the arcade fighter". A reviewer for Next Generation remarked that "The 3DO conversion is nearly identical to the arcade version, much more faithful than the previous SNES, Genesis, and Sega CD versions. The load time between rounds is noticeable, but acceptable." He gave it three out of five stars. GamePro praised the general gameplay, but criticized the quality of the conversion, complaining that the scaling is not as smooth as the arcade version, the animations are slower, the load times are interminably long, and the gameplay is crippled by a poor control configuration, which the player is not given the option to change.

GamePro named the Sega CD port the best game for the add-on at the 1994 Consumer Electronics Show. Their eventual review, however, was largely mixed, criticizing the slowdown, lack of scaling, frequent load times, and low-quality reproduction of the arcade version's sounds. They added that since Samurai Shodown was by then a three-year-old game, it made the faults of the Sega CD version stand out more. Electronic Gaming Monthly scored it 30 out of 40 and called it "the best conversion of the game that made the Neo Geo the system of choice for fighting games." They praised the accurate graphics, short load times, and ease of pulling off special moves. In 2018, Complex ranked the SNES version of Samurai Shodown 40th on their list of "The Best Super Nintendo Games of All Time", praising the graphics and controls and saying everything is "on point" in the game. In 1995, Flux magazine ranked Samurai Shodown 80th on their list of the "Top 100 Video Games". In 1996, Super Play ranked the SNES version 99th on its list of the "Top 100 SNES Games of All Time".

== Legacy ==
Three anime adaptations based on the game have been made. Samurai Spirits: Haten Gouma no Shou in 1994, which is a full-length film; Samurai Spirits 2: Asura Zanmaden in 1999, with two episodes and Nakoruru ~Ano hito kara no okurimono~ in 2002, a one-episode OVA.
