= Plok! =

1993 video game

- North American cover art
- Developer: Software Creations
- Publishers: EU: Nintendo; NA: Tradewest; JP: Activision Japan
- Designer: Ste Pickford; John Pickford
- Programmer: John Buckley
- Artist: Lyndon Brooke
- Composers: Tim Follin; Geoff Follin
- Platform: Super Nintendo Entertainment System
- Release: NA: September 1993; EU: 1 December 1993; JP: 10 December 1993
- Genre: Platform
- Mode: Single-player

Plok! is a 1993 platform game developed by Software Creations and published by Nintendo for the Super Nintendo Entertainment System (SNES). The player controls the hood-headed titular protagonist, the king of the island Akrillic, who is defending it from fleas spawned by the Flea Queen, hidden beneath the island's surface, as well as other bosses attempting to usurp Plok's power. Plok's versatility lies in his four detachable limbs, which can be used to attack targets and enemies, along with various power-ups scattered throughout the game's colorful stages, referred to as "presents".

The history of Plok! began in the late 1980s as a self-funded coin-op project by Ste and John Pickford called Fleapit. They developed it while working at Zippo Games and programmed it for Rare's 'Razz Board' hardware. The project was canceled in 1990 following the closure of Zippo Games, but was later revived as an SNES game developed at Software Creations after the Pickfords were promoted to higher positions, with Ste becoming an art director and John a producer. Software Creations self-funded the game, with the Pickfords retaining ownership of its intellectual property rights. A port for the Mega Drive was planned, but was canceled for unknown reasons.

Plok! received positive reviews from critics, who praised its innovative ideas, variety, music, presentation, versatile protagonist, and level design. However, some noted skepticism about its similarity to other colorful platform games of the era. The Pickfords attributed the game's underwhelming sales to the market saturation of mascot-driven platformers.

== Gameplay ==
The first level of Cotton Island

Plok! offers two difficulty modes: "Normal," which includes the entire game, and "Child's Play," which removes the harder stages and reduces both the speed and hit points of enemies. Players can earn "Plokontinues" by collecting four P-L-O-K tokens, with one token awarded for completing a level without losing a life. If a Game Over occurs, the player restarts with a score of 0, three lives, and at the most recent Plokontinue checkpoint. Saving is limited to two "Permanent Continue Positions," which are unlocked after defeating the Bobbins Brothers and Rockyfella bosses. These allow the player to resume from specific points even after resetting the game. The game does not include a password feature.

Plok can launch any of his four limbs—two arms and two legs—as projectiles to attack enemies. If a limb hits an enemy, it returns immediately to Plok, but if it misses, it takes longer to come back. Limbs can pass through specific obstacles, such as rock pillars. However, Plok cannot fire limbs while somersaulting. In later levels, certain puzzles require Plok to "sacrifice" a limb to activate scenery-changing switches. When a limb strikes a target, it is placed on a hanger near the switch. Some targets require specific limbs, and when Plok loses all his limbs, he moves by bouncing, which makes him harder to control.

Plok's secondary attack, the "Speed Blade," is a buzzsaw-like move that enhances his speed and delivers maximum damage to enemies. He can collect shells, which grant extra lives and serve as ammunition for a special amulet obtained partway through the game. The amulet converts shells into energy for his secondary attack. Players can also find "Magic Fruits," which heal Plok's health. The more he punches a fruit, the larger it grows, restoring additional health. Rare "Golden Fruits" fully replenish his energy. In certain stages, some fruits transport Plok to bonus areas where he must complete timed challenges or collect all shells to progress. Successfully completing these sections may allow Plok to skip certain levels or boss fights.

"Presents" temporarily transform Plok into characters inspired by his favorite movies, such as "Plocky," which equips him with boxing gloves; "Vigilante Plok," a flamethrower-wielding character resembling the "Ploxterminator"; the Deerstalker-wearing "Squire Plok," armed with a blunderbuss; "Cowboy Plok," a gun-slinging character inspired by westerns; and "Rocket Plok," equipped with multiple rocket launchers. Presents found in the Fleapit grant access to high-tech, futuristic vehicles equipped with weapons. These include a unicycle with a water cannon, an "off-road truck" with a rocket launcher, a jetpack with lasers, a motorbike armed with grenades, a tank, a bomb-dropping helicopter, a flying saucer with plasma cannons, and a pair of spring pogo shoes.

Players face various enemies throughout the game, including the recurring fleas. In most levels (excluding Cotton Island, Legacy Island, and Fleapit), Plok must eliminate all fleas to complete the stage. The final flea in each level drops a flag, which levitates to its flagpole, signaling that the player can proceed.

== Plot ==
As king, Plok resides on Akrillic, a large island in the fictional archipelago of Polyesta. One morning, Plok discovers that the big square flag atop the pole on his house's rooftop has been stolen, prompting him to set out in search of it. He spots the flag on Cotton Island from afar and sails there to retrieve it. However, during his search, Plok encounters several impostor flags, including a pair of underpants and a striped scarf, which only frustrate him further.

Eventually, Plok encounters the culprits responsible for the fake flags—the Bobbins Brothers, two giant creatures his grandpappy had warned him about. Plok battles the brothers to retrieve his flag.

After defeating the Bobbins Brothers and reclaiming his big square flag, Plok sails back to Akrillic, only to find the island overrun by "fleas"—two-legged blue insects that hatch from eggs and hop around. He learns that the flag theft was merely a ruse to lure him away from his island. Determined to reclaim his home, Plok travels across Akrillic, defeating every flea on the island's surface to restore his kingdom.

Partway through the game, Plok places the big square flag back where it belongs outside his home and takes a break, sitting on the foot of a statue of his grandfather, Grandpappy Plok. Reflecting on the situation, Plok wishes he had found an amulet to help him deal with the fleas. He falls asleep and dreams of his grandfather's quest for an amulet 50 years earlier.

In the dream, the player assumes the role of Grandpappy Plok, who sails from Akrillic to Legacy Island. Much like his grandson, Grandpappy faces bizarre obstacles, discovers artifacts (including Rockyfella), and encounters the Bobbin Brothers along with their third sibling, Irving.

After defeating the Bobbin Brothers and Irving, Grandpappy finally uncovers the amulet he had been seeking. He returns triumphantly to Akrillic. Back in the present, Plok wakes up and discovers that the amulet is hidden at the base of Grandpappy's statue.

Equipped with the amulet, Plok gains the ability to "charge" his buzzsaw jump attack by sacrificing the shells he has collected. With his newfound power, Plok's mission to reclaim Akrillic from the fleas resumes with greater determination.

Plok then ventures into various locations around the island, confronting creatures attempting to overthrow Akrillic: Penkinos, a group of inflatable, floating magicians of mysterious origin living in the northern part of the island; Womack, a spider residing in the island's center whose long legs serve as its weak points; and Rockyfella, the spirit of the island's soil, who resides beneath the mountains in the island's southeast and harbors resentment toward Plok for planting flagpoles in the ground.

After eliminating all the enemies on the island, Plok journeys to the Fleapit, the source of the fleas, where he utilizes various weaponized vehicles. He confronts the Flea Queen, the leader who hatched the fleas, using a high-tech "secret Super-Vehicle" equipped with bug spray to defeat her. Following the battle, Plok returns home to rest on his green chair.

== Development ==
=== 1988: Rare hires Zippo Games ===
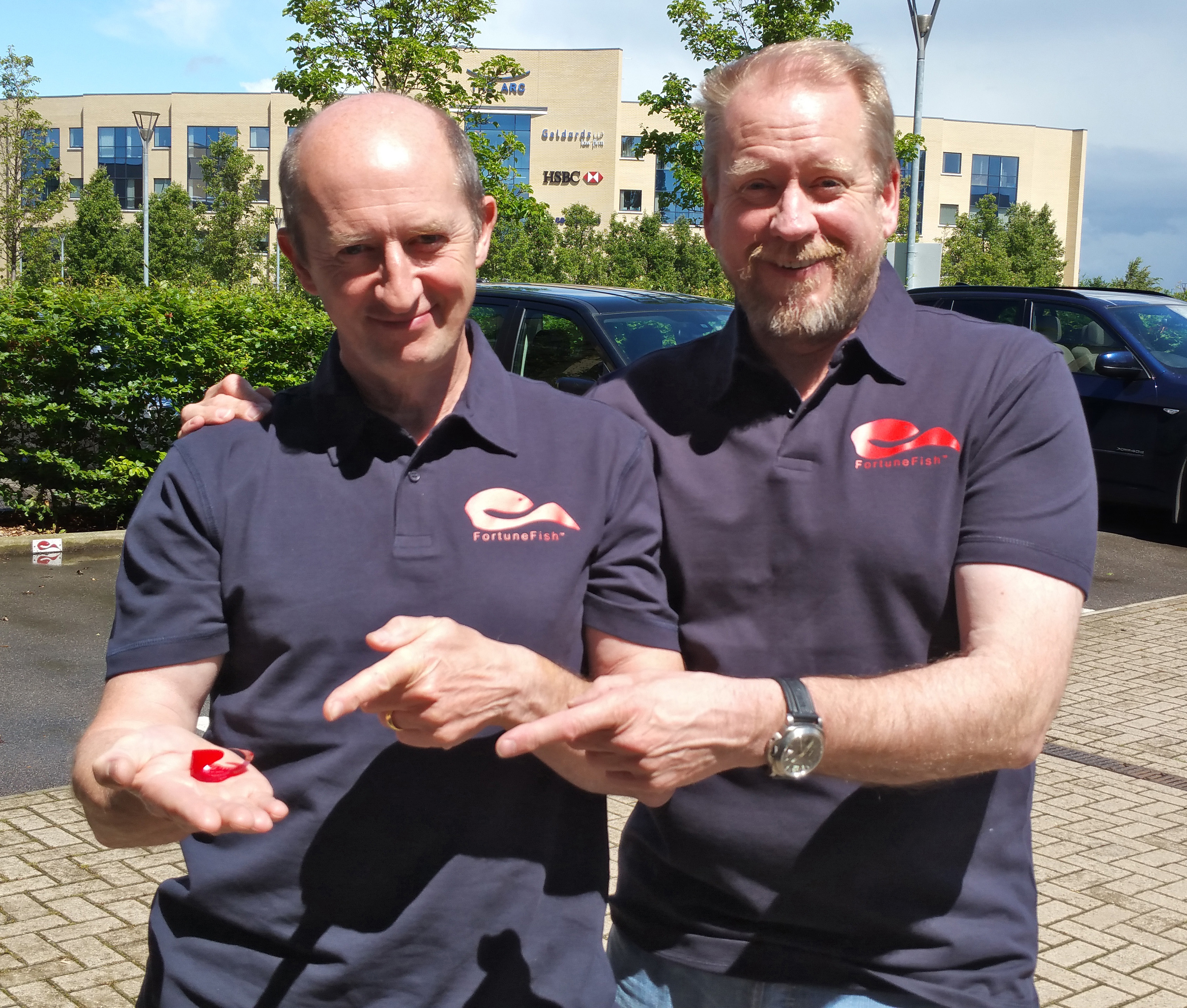
Rare founders Tim and Chris Stamper in 2015. They required Ste and John Pickford to play Mario and Zelda games on the Nintendo Entertainment System, which shifted the Pickfords' perspective on game development.

In the summer of 1988, Ste and John Pickford, employees at Zippo Games—owned by John and their friend Steve Hughes—were struggling to complete games for 16-bit Atari ST and Amiga computers, with many projects being canceled. They learned that Rare was seeking developers for Nintendo Entertainment System (NES) titles. At the time, the console had yet to gain popularity in the United Kingdom. Despite viewing the 8-bit system as "horribly overpriced and terribly underpowered," the Pickfords accepted the offer due to financial necessity and their admiration for the work of Rare founders Tim and Chris Stamper during their time at Ultimate Play the Game. Zippo Games became the only company Rare consulted for NES development.

Although initially skeptical of the NES, the Pickfords' experience working on Ironsword—along with the Stamper brothers’ requirement that they play Mario and Zelda games on the console—gave them a newfound appreciation for the system. This shifted their development priorities from focusing on technical sophistication to emphasizing the player's experience. This design philosophy ultimately shaped their approach to Plok!.

=== 1988–1989: Fleapit ===
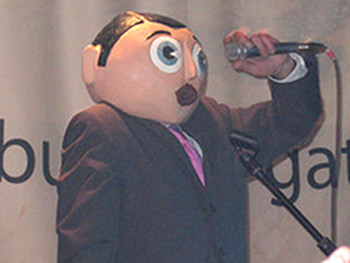
Chris Sievey as Frank Sidebottom in 2006. He was slated to voice the playable character of Fleapit before its cancellation.

While Ste was designing the shop screen for Ironsword, John conceived a character with a hangman's hood. Ste sketched the concept in the margin of the layout. The idea of detachable limbs also emerged in this sketch, depicted with an arrow pointing to a pile of the character's parts below it. John then envisioned a game where players captured jumping fleas, deciding to make the hangman character the protagonist. The name "Plok" was spontaneously coined when John placed letters from a cassette tape cover on his computer mouse. His full name, "Plok the Exploding Man," highlighted his separable limbs. With John's encouragement, Ste moved to clean sheets of paper to develop further sketches, where he refined Plok's colors, poses, size (32x40), and expressive features, such as his wide-open mouth.

After these ideas were formed, Chris Stamper visited Zippo Games to introduce the Razz Board, a coin-op hardware system he had designed. The Pickfords were impressed by the hardware's advanced graphics capabilities and saw an opportunity to create a "real arcade game," akin to those they had admired in their youth. While they had previously worked on an Amiga-based coin-op system for World Darts, they had never developed a "true" arcade title. They struck a deal with Rare to use the Razz Board for their dream project, with ownership of the game property and a significant share of board sales revenue. However, the agreement also required the brothers to self-fund the project. The game was titled Fleapit.

Ste vaguely recalled Fleapit in a 2014 interview, comparing its gameplay to Excitebots: Trick Racing (2009), where the player had to catch one of several flying footballs to score a touchdown in the middle of a level. He described the game as only slightly more "primitive" than Plok!, with stages that scrolled horizontally and vertically, featuring more "set pieces or one-off levels." The backgrounds included food items like sausages and doughnuts, along with a space level.

As development continued, Rare was primarily profiting from selling NES titles, which led them to focus less on Razz Board games like Fleapit. In 1989, Rare became the first company outside of Japan to obtain a Game Boy, instructing Zippo Games to develop a game for the handheld console. This shift in focus meant that Fleapit's development had to be halted. The relationship between Rare and Zippo Games deteriorated after Zippo failed to complete a Game Boy title as directed, and in 1990, Rare bought out Zippo Games, renaming it Rare Manchester, which was subsequently shut down. As a result of Zippo Games' closure and dwindling funds, Fleapit was canceled half-completed in 1990. Ste admitted in 2014 that their desire to produce a coin-op led to poor business decisions, including rejecting more financially lucrative console projects.

Late in Fleapit's development, the Pickfords secured comedian Chris Sievey to voice Plok. They contacted him in 1990 through the number listed on one of his songs, "969 1909." The Pickfords met Sievey in his Frank Sidebottom costume at The Ritz venue, offering to work for free. However, shortly after, Fleapit was canceled, and Sievey never voiced the character.

=== 1990–1993: From Zippo to Software Creations ===
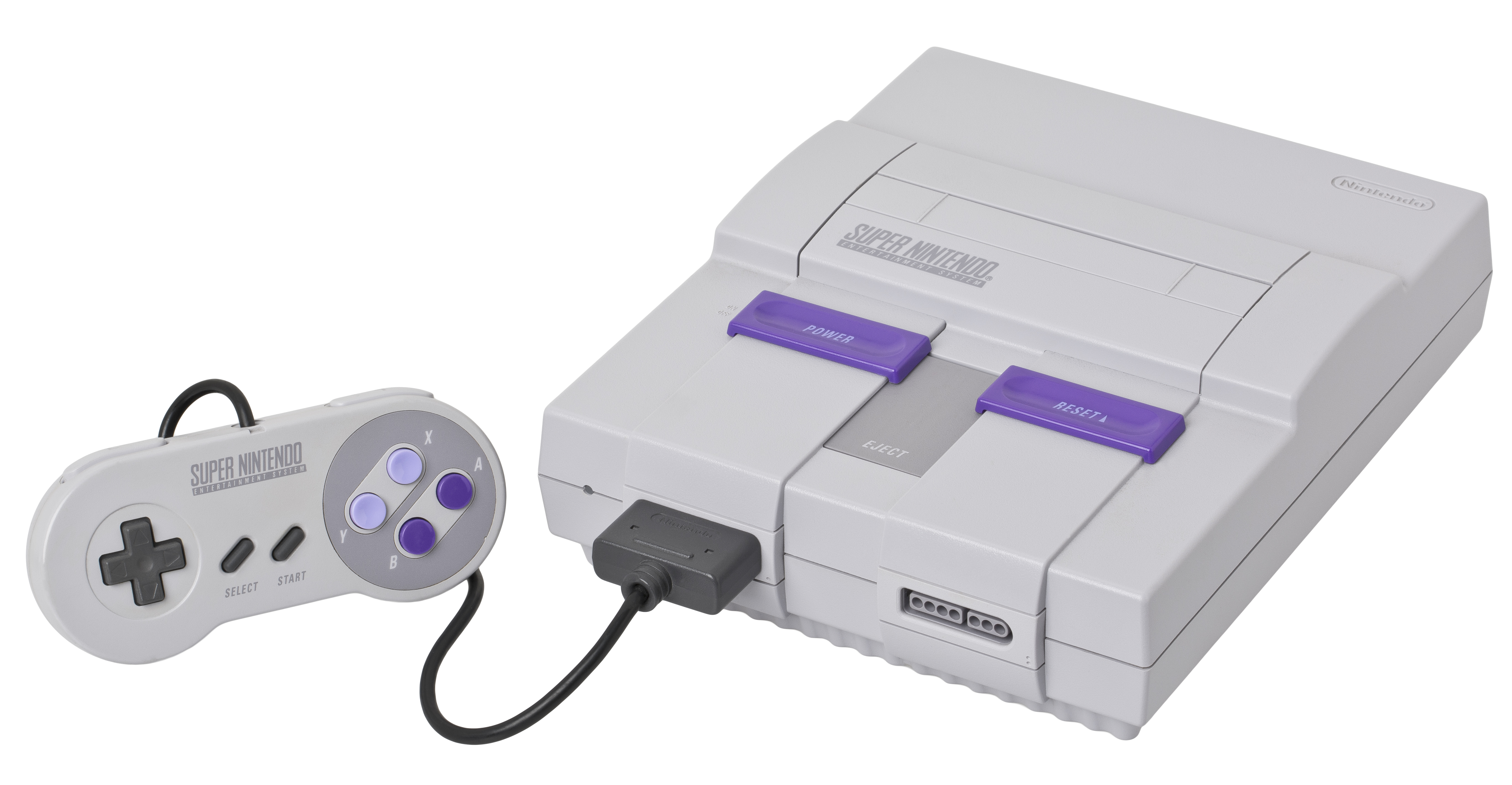
Plok! developer Software Creations was the first non-Japanese company to have a development kit for the Super Nintendo Entertainment System.

After leaving Zippo, John contacted Richard Hay, the head of Software Creations, the first company outside of Japan to possess a development kit for the Super Nintendo Entertainment System (SNES). Hay hired the Pickfords immediately to use the kit to design and program Equinox (1993), a sequel to the NES title Solstice (1990). The Pickfords were eventually promoted to higher positions, with Ste becoming an art director and John a producer.

Meanwhile, the Pickfords continued working on Fleapit, developing new characters and locations, and creating additional pitch illustrations. Near the completion of Equinox, the Pickfords presented Fleapit to Hay, pitching it under a new name: Plok! Although the brothers and Hay considered several consoles, including the NES, Super NES, and Game Boy, only a Super NES version of the game came to fruition. Development once again required self-funding, but this time it was provided by Software Creations rather than just the Pickfords.

The Plok! team included the two brothers as producers, art directors, and designers; John Buckley as programmer; Lyndon Brooke as graphic artist; Tim and Geoff Follin as music and sound developers; Kevin Edwards and Stephen Ruddy as compressors; Dan Whitworth, who created additional graphics; and 18-year-old Chun Wah Kong, who joined in spring 1993 as a tester. Software Creations hired animators recently laid off from a Manchester studio for some of their games, including Whitworth. He animated the title screen (where Plok plays a harmonica to the theme song) while Ste was on a two-week holiday, and Whitworth's work was enthusiastically received by the staff.

Plok! was the Pickford brothers' first experience as project managers, as well as the first time they collaborated with other developers to turn their ideas into a finished product. Buckley later admitted that Plok! was his most "proud" work. Kong also admitted that his experience as the game's tester prepared him for his role as lead designer on Team Soho's PlayStation 2 title The Getaway (2002): "QA is great grounding for designers. It makes you think critically about how players approach your level; how to reward curiosity if the player wanders off the beaten track; how different approaches could break the game."

Although the Pickfords allowed Buckley and Brooke to contribute many ideas, development was not without conflict. The biggest argument occurred late in development over the game's difficulty. While Buckley and Brooks felt the difficulty was appropriate, the Pickfords found it too overbearing. To settle the dispute, the first eight stages, originally meant for Cotton Island, were moved to the later Grandpappy Plok dream stages, and eight new, easier Cotton Island stages were created. According to Buckley, the dream levels were conceived to vary the pacing, particularly with the Amulet. Kong also reported that one of the publishers wanted the difficulty of the first level decreased, so the staff reduced the bouncing sprouts' hit points from two to one. However, in the tutorial segment of the final game, the sprouts take two hits as Plok fires an extra arm. While Software Creations did include collectible continues (called "Plokontinues") for Plok!, it did not include a save battery due to the cost, and passwords were scrapped out of fear that gaming magazines would spread them.

Kong recalled that most of the game was completed near the end of Equinox's testing.

=== Graphics and art ===
During Fleapit's development, Ste created his black-and-white concept art with Letratone to make it look professional.

Many of Plok!'s visuals were formulated during its Fleapit stage, when it was being programmed for the Razz Board. The hardware had an unusual system that executed higher-depth graphics and performed better with fewer data. Unlike other hardware that used bitmap grids to encode colors and transparency through binary numbers, the Razz Board hardware stored pixels as bytes, with the first six bits determining color, the seventh bit setting its vertical position relative to its predecessor, and the eighth determining its horizontal position. For instance, using a bitmap system to create a 32-pixel line requires a grid of 1,024 pixels (32x32) with 992 of them being transparent, whereas making the same line took only 32 bytes in Razz Board. This meant sprites weren't restricted to perfectly square sizes, which Ste took advantage of when creating the text font, although he set an arbitrary limit of 22x29. For the SNES game, Brooke designed two new fonts for 16x16 and 8x8 bitmap grids: one based on Ste's font for Fleapit, which in turn was based on his lettering in concept drawings, and another for the silent movie-esque screens in the Legacy Island levels. Software Creations' leader and Plok! executive producer Mike Webb reported compressing 50% of the game's 16-megabit graphics data (equivalent to Street Fighter II) down to eight megabits.

Fleapit was the Pickfords' first game in which Ste created concept art, aiming to appear more professional and adapt to an increased focus on presentation for buyers in the industry. According to Ste, this shift changed the process of green-lighting a game, moving beyond simply starting programming: "Everyone in the industry was self-taught, and there were no standards or expectations of how a new game should progress. I remember it being a struggle to justify spending work time drawing pretty pictures which wouldn't actually contribute to the game." Ste added shades to the concept art using Letratone as an easy method to achieve a businesslike aesthetic. He drew the illustrations in black and white, focusing more on shape than on color, as photocopying technology at the time only allowed monochrome prints. The color scheme was initially designed for an 8-bit arcade title; to achieve a "natural" look, colors were concentrated into extreme areas of the RGB color wheel. When the project evolved into a 16-bit SNES game, the color scheme—though generally the same—became more detailed with a wider palette, and Ste used magic markers to color the concept art. This art was used not only for the game but also for other titles and potential franchise products, as well as illustrations for the instruction manual.

John's first plan for maximizing the use of the Razz Board was through Plok's animation; since he had separable limbs, all six parts were animated as independently-moving static sprites. The separated limbs made Plok easier to animate and reduced the graphical data required, as static parts could be coded to move and rotate instead of creating multiple frames. Ste also designed Plok's boots and gloves to be oversized, maximizing the potential of the detachable-limb design. The fleas, though animated traditionally with frames, had only two legs to simplify animating extreme poses and prevent the sprite from becoming too busy. Ste reported using "5 or 6" frames for all of the fleas' movements. For the SNES console, Brooke only slightly altered the design of Plok and the fleas, but Plok's animation method was transformed. The SNES, using the traditional bitmap method to execute pixels, required Brooke to animate Plok frame-by-frame.

=== Concepts and design ===
Fleapit characters not included in Plok! include Armstrong, a "mini-version" of Rockyfella; and Suki, a manga-style character who ran an item shop. The Bobbins Brothers and Womack were carried over from Fleapit (although Womack underwent a major redesign by Brooke, which Ste appreciated) while the Penkinos were originally conceived for Plok!.

The "floating" limb movements were coded in John's first prototype of Fleapit, with the idea of removing limbs incorporated later as the Pickfords experimented. The concept of costume and vehicle power-ups also originated in Fleapit, although the set of power-ups changed, with only the helicopter carrying over; Fleapit-exclusive power-ups included "Robo Plok," a robot form that improved maneuverability and was inspired by Ro-Jaws from the 2000 AD comics; "Ninja Plok," which armed him with an endless supply of throwing stars; and "Super Plok," a superhero form with flying abilities. Plok also had the "smart bomb," an ability in which he enraged himself to the point of exploding and wiping out all enemies on screen (as well as his own limbs).

By the time development of the SNES game began, the code for Fleapit had been lost. As a result, Buckley started programming based on what he saw in VHS footage of the game, including Plok attacking fleas with his limbs and skidding down slanted platforms. Brooke conceived the idea of triggering parts of the scenery with limbs, reasoning that the scenery "looked a bit rough" when constantly looping. However, executing this idea proved difficult, as it affected the collision detection and caused Plok's movements to be jerky. He came up with the limb-holding coat hangers two weeks later. The vehicles were left for the final stages, as incorporating them into earlier levels would have required too much work to "balance" them with the other aspects of those stages.

=== Audio ===
"A Line in the Sand"
A 30-second sample of "A Line in the Sand" (also referred to as "Beach"), involving a change in both time signature (from 7/8 to 4/4) and tempo

Samples
Some of Plok!'s instruments: single-sample guitar chords (0:00–0:05; title theme), simple-waveform lead instruments like harmonicas (0:05–0:11; title theme) and guitars (0:11–0:21; "A Line in the Sand"), and a breathing noise (0:21–0:29; boss theme)

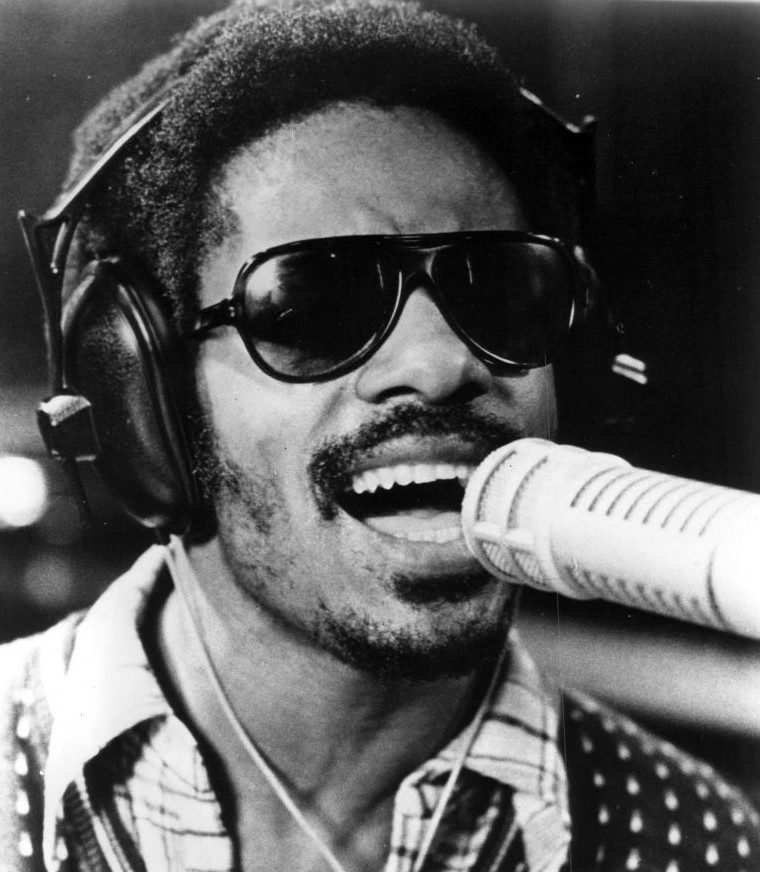
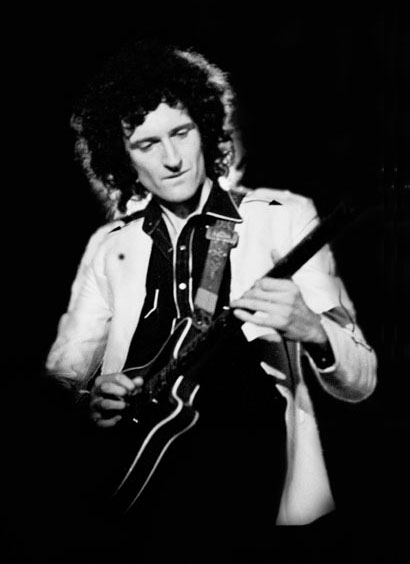
"A Line in the Sand" was inspired by the works of Stevie Wonder (left in 1973) and Brian May (right in 1979).

When it came to NES and SNES titles, Software Creations was notable for pushing the limits of a hardware's sound, including with Plok!. Work on Plok!'s soundtrack, composed by Tim and Geoff Follin, began halfway through development. It was categorized by Nintendo World Report as typical of other kid-friendly platform games, though "a bit manic, deceptively bombastic, and diverse in tone". Ste reported that Geoff did around 75% of the work and was far more open to discussion with the team, while Tim was more "elusive".

Plok! continues the Follin brothers' incorporation of old rock music influences. For instance, "A Line in the Sand" was inspired by the works of Stevie Wonder, with its guitar solo influenced by Queen guitarist Brian May. Tim Follin composed the title song using a two-chord progression from "Tequila" by rock and roll group The Champs, as two guitar chord samples could fit within the memory limitations. Lead instruments, such as an electric guitar and harmonicas, were made from simple waveforms, with the guitar's waveform being identical to a square. A breathing sample in the boss theme was also used in Equinox and Spider-Man and the X-Men in Arcade's Revenge (1992).

The soundtrack has been released on physical formats twice. On July 27, 2019, it was issued on cassette by CANVAS Ltd. It was also released as a limited-edition 500-copy double vinyl on Record Store Day (April 18) 2020 by Respawned Records; Respawned's release featured official song titles, liner notes, and artwork by the Pickfords, with both 180-gram vinyl records colored red and yellow. Rare composer David Wise has expressed admiration for Plok!, claiming his work on Donkey Kong Country was inspired by the Follin brothers' soundtrack.

== Release ==
=== Publishing ===
Software Creations was so confident in Plok! that the developer tried to persuade Nintendo to publish it. Reception from the corporation's Japan and American branches was positive. Shigeru Miyamoto expressed strong interest in working on the game; when Plok! was only half-finished. Hay said that Miyamoto wrote a letter to Hay claiming it was the third-best platform game, below Sonic and Mario, and that he would make it the second-greatest in the genre, above Sonic but below Mario. Tony Harman, product acquisitions and development manager at Nintendo of America, also visited the studio to play Plok! four weeks into its development, and told Kay that Miyamoto was amazed by the game's audio, to the point of analyzing it. However, Nintendo only published Plok! in Europe, while Tradewest and Activision published it in North America and Japan, respectively. While Nintendo's reasons for this remain undisclosed, Ste believes that Miyamoto found the game, particularly its mini-race levels, too similar to the then-in-development first-party title Super Mario World 2: Yoshi's Island.

A port for the Mega Drive was planned but ultimately cancelled for unknown reasons.

=== Promotion ===
The Pickfords, despite owning the IP and developing Plok!, were never consulted on its promotion. Tradewest set Plok!'s primary demographic at gamers aged six to fourteen. Although published by Tradewest in the United States, Plok! still received promotion from Nintendo of America; a complete guide and review was published in the October 1993 issue of its magazine Nintendo Power, and a two-page section in a Nintendo Player's Guide book for Mario Paint (1993) included templates of body part stamps to animate Plok and the flea enemies, along with a background painting based on one of the Cotton Island levels. In the United Kingdom, Nintendo released a VHS tape, Super Mario All-Stars Video (1993); hosted by Craig Charles, the video features a segment of testers at Nintendo UK promoting upcoming games, including Plok! Club Nintendo, Germany's official Nintendo magazine, ran a comic strip where Plok races with Mario at an Olympic match in space.

Some print advertising was later criticized by Ste for not showcasing enough of the game itself. Tradewest's US print advertisement depicted the top half taken up by Double Dragon and Battletoads, with the bottom half showing an image of the Plok character; the only information revealed was that Plok! was published by the two other franchises. Nintendo's UK print ad depicted a faux desktop screenshot with an image of an angry old lady in the house as the wallpaper; the only Plok! visual depicted was its box art, placed in the bottom right and very small-sized.

However, other print advertisements were much more true to the game, such as Tradewest's series of comic book panel ads named The Adventures of Plok, which explored Plok's origins within the storyline.

Plok! was first announced in June 1993; upon its announcement, an N-Force journalist called it one of the most "surreal" games in the September 1993 line-up. Tradewest presented Plok! at the summer 1993 Consumer Electronics Show; a GameFan writer called Tradewest "one of the [show's] most impressive third-party line-ups," highlighting Plok! as "a colorful new action title with a lead character that hurls his arms and legs at attackers."

== Reception ==
=== Contemporaneous reviews ===
Contemporaneous and retrospective reviews (SNES)

Review scores
Publication	Score
AllGame	3.5/5
Aktueller Software Markt	10/12
Consoles +	70%
Computer and Video Games	80/100
Electronic Gaming Monthly	8/10 (Note: In Electronic Gaming Monthly's review, four critics gave Plok! different ratings: two scored it 8/10, one 7/10, and another 9/10.)
Famitsu	6/10, 7/10, 5/10, 4/10
GamePro	4.125/5 (Note: GamePro gave Plok! three 4/5 scores for graphics, control and fun factor, and a 4.5/5 for sound.)
GameStar	70% (Note: While GameStar's review was mainly by Steve Polak that rated it 86%, it featured a second opinion from another critic that scored it 55%.)
GameZone	60/100
HobbyConsolas	88/100
Hyper	84%
Jeuxvideo.com	15/20
Mega Fun	80%
Nintendo Life	8/10
Official Nintendo Magazine	81/100
Superjuegos	94/100
Super Play	90%
Total!	80% (UK); 5/6 (Germany)
Video Games (DE)	76%
VideoGames & Computer Entertainment	9/10
Cubed3	8/10
Electronic Games	81%
Game Power	87/100
Nintendo Acción	82/100
Play Time	80/100
Super Action	80%
Super Pro	87/100

Upon release, some critics declared Plok! the best Nintendo release of 1993, as well as another classic by the company, the best platform game of the year, and one of the all-time best in the genre. However, Plok! was often compared to many other games of its kind, and even the most favorable reviewers expressed skepticism about playing yet another average, colorful, cutesy platform game. Some critics ultimately thought it was and criticized its lack of depth. A frequent comparison was made to Sonic the Hedgehog (1991), particularly in its "sugary" tone and Plok's speed ball attack; GameStar's FI derogatorily labeled the titular character as "a puny version" of the Sega franchise's blue hedgehog, criticizing his weird design and calling him names such as "hot pink reddy coloured duck penguin thing" and "freaky pork chop."

However, other reviewers opined that Plok! was distinguished in the genre, noting innovative aspects such as the costume and weapon power-ups and limb mechanics. Reviews also enjoyed its humor, such as with Plok's limbless movements, his power-ups, and nonsensical story; Humphreys felt it would help the game be enjoyed by even the biggest detractors of kid-friendly platformers. The hero was applauded for being charming, more lovable than other mascots of its kind, and versatile, particularly with his limbs and his costume and weapon power-ups. Trenton Webb found the limb mechanic "quite fun to mess around with uselessly," and an Electronic Gaming Monthly critic called it "catchy" with "plenty of situations to test it." Superjuegos writer The Elf called his vehicle power-ups "fantastic and fun," and Hyper magazine's Jason Humphreys claimed the cowboy power-up was his favorite.

Some critics were addicted to Plok!s gameplay and eulogized its playability, perfect control, and variety. Super Plays Jonathan Davies felt it kept adding new concepts as the game went on, and praised some of them, such as patterns of item placements directing the player to off-camera platforms and bouncing off water instead of drowning to death.

Plok!'s difficulty was also highlighted, mostly attributed to the lack of a password system, save feature, and the requirement for continues to be earned. Other contributors to the challenge included long stage lengths and sudden obstacles such as rolling logs. One Total! journalist reported being confused about what action to take next in some stages, and another from HobbyConsolas disclosed getting lost in levels and being unable to locate targets and fleas required to complete levels. While some reviewers approved of the game's difficulty, others disliked not being able to save or use passwords, reasoning it was annoying to replay earlier stages repeatedly.

The cartoony graphics were praised as colorful, surreal, adorable, and featuring "vivid backgrounds";. One reviewer called them some of the best on the Super Nintendo, while another compared them to Equinox. FI appreciated the detail, such as Plok's breathing animation when standing still and the many "little colored flowers everywhere, looking like real flower power stuff." The music was highlighted (by one critic as the game's best aspect) and noted for pushing the hardware limitations, and sound effects were praised.

=== Commercial performance and plans for a franchise ===
John Pickford and Kay had faith in Plok! being commercially successful. The Pickford brothers secured IP ownership of the Plok character, a practice common in other media industries but rare in the video game industry; and they planned a franchise around it, including sequels, ports, and merchandise. A Mega Drive version was planned using software created by a Software Creations employee to automatically convert SNES titles into Mega Drive games; 80% of the code was automatically converted, according to Ste, with the remaining 20% requiring manual work. However, despite Webb announcing the port's completion in an April 1994 interview, it was never released for unknown reasons.

Ste, using magic markers, created artwork for future sequels and merchandise, such as style guides for the characters and illustrations of scenes. The Pickfords planned for sequels to involve Plok searching for the fleas' home, introducing a setting named Tower Island, and making Plok's comfy chair (which he sleeps on in the end credits of Plok!) a more significant part of the gameplay. The Pickfords also created concepts for toys used to pitch the SNES game, including a doll where limbs were attached and detached with velcro. During marketing, a Plok model was created in 3D Studio 4 for a promotional photo by Software Creations.

However, in 1992, late in Plok!'s development, the market saw a saturation of colorful platform games starring cute mascots, such as Bubsy and Zool. Ste, in 2004, publicly stated that developers and producers with more financial backing were aware of previews of the Fleapit coin-op, which may have influenced them to produce similar games; though there are no other reports verifying this. Although the game sold decently over time, none of the revenue went to the Pickfords, and Ste suggested that the market saturation significantly hindered its commercial performance; this, combined with Software Creations constantly changing publishers between projects, made the Plok! franchise impossible for several years.

== Legacy ==
In 2009, North American company Super Fighter Team released Zaku, a horizontal shooter for the Atari Lynx, which features a special guest appearance by Plok.

The Pickfords later launched a Plok webcomic. The webcomic takes place 20 years after the game, featuring new characters as well as returning ones like Rockyfella. The comic occasionally used pop-culture references from other games and media, along with in-jokes and commentaries on the game's development and future.

In later years, Plok was ranked the 26th best SNES title of all time (and the best platformer produced in the United Kingdom) in 1996, the 19th best platform game by Gamereactor in 2014, and was listed in Edge editor Tony Mott's 1001 Video Games You Must Play Before You Die in its 2013 edition. Video game elements introduced in Plok! were noted by retrospective journalists as being present in more popular platformers released in later years. Games starring characters with floating body parts used as weapons, such as Dynamite Headdy (1994) and Rayman (1995), were released shortly afterward and garnered much wider exposure. When listing Plok! on a list of "The Most Unappreciated Platformers of the '90s" for Kotaku, Ben Bertoli wrote it was "influential for portraying a world, named Akrill[ic], based on craft supplies and cloth, a concept that Nintendo itself has come to rely on for many games. The game also provided players with power-ups and vehicles, such as flamethrowers and jetpacks, the likes of which had not been seen in a single game." Sepia-toned flashback stages also featured prominently in Mickey Mania (1994).
