= Altered Space =

1991 video game

- North American cover art
- Developer: Software Creations
- Publishers: NA: Sony Imagesoft; JP: Epic/Sony Records; EU: Hi Tech Expressions
- Programmer: Mike Follin
- Artist: Anthony Anderson
- Composer: Geoff Follin
- Platform: Game Boy
- Release: NA: September 1991; JP: November 29, 1991; EU: 1991
- Genres: Puzzle; Adventure
- Mode: Single-player

Altered Space is a 1991 video game produced for the Nintendo Game Boy.

== Gameplay ==
The player is an astronaut named Humphrey trapped on a spaceship of an alien race known as the Zaks. In addition to avoiding the Zaks, the player must also avoid wardenlike spherical creatures known as Garffs. Humphrey cannot breathe the Zaks' air, so he needs to constantly replenish his own oxygen supply. The Zaks will take half of Humphrey's air should they capture him and send him to a detaining point to be reset like a checkpoint. The object of the game is for Humphrey to reach his own impounded spacecraft and flee back to Earth.

This was the first isometric view game on the Game Boy.

== Development ==
Altered Space was developed by Software Creations. It was published by Sony Imagesoft in the United States and by Epic/Sony Records in Japan.

== Release and reception ==
Reception

Review scores
Publication	Score
Famitsu	6/10, 5/10, 4/10, 4/10
Games-X	4/5
GB Action	84%

Altered Space was released for the Game Boy in Japan on November 29, 1991.

Reviewers in Famitsu compared the game to Solstice (1990) due to its isometric view point. They found this led to confusion in controls initially as they often moved in unintended directions. One reviewer said the game was cruel as it often led them to die in ways they deemed unfair. A reviewer in Games-X found the game similar to older British computer games like Knight Lore (1984) for the ZX Spectrum finding it as impressive as the older classics but lacking in terms of its music quality.

In a retrospective review in GB Action from 1994, a reviewer said the game had a considerable emphasis on playability and adventure which are both absent in many contemporary Game Boy games, but found it less polished than the similar game Monster Max.
