= Gauntlet III: The Final Quest =

1991 video game

- Gauntlet III Commodore 64 box art
- Developers: Tengen; Software Creations (Amiga, Atari ST)
- Publisher: U.S. Gold
- Director: David Broadhurst
- Designers: Michael Delves; Paul Salmon
- Programmers: Bill Barna (Atari ST); Michael Delves (Amiga)
- Artists: Paul Salmon; Chris Collins
- Composers: Timothy Follin; Geoffrey Follin
- Series: Gauntlet
- Platforms: Amiga, Amstrad CPC, Atari ST, Commodore 64, ZX Spectrum
- Release: 1991; Amiga & Atari ST; Spring 1991
- Genres: Hack and slash, dungeon crawl
- Modes: Single-player, multiplayer

Gauntlet III: The Final Quest is a home computer game by U.S. Gold and Tengen. It was released in 1991 for the Amiga, Atari ST, Commodore 64, ZX Spectrum, and Amstrad CPC. Besides the standard four main Gauntlet characters, Thor, Thyra, Merlin, and Questor, four new playable characters were available: Petras, a rock man; Dracolis, a lizard man; Blizzard, an ice man; and Neptune, a Merman. The game is viewed from an isometric perspective and the cooperative multiplayer mode supports two-players.

== Plot ==
A land called Capra was having many wars among its kingdoms; peace would come but then another war would start. Then one day a wizard named Magnus came and brought peace, but to make sure there would never be another war he created a door to the dark dimensions from which evil things would come, if there was ever another war: "This be the Final Peace for if it is broken, all Capra will be at the mercy of the devourers". Then the Velcrons came to these kingdoms. They were servants of the things behind the door. They took over the magic kingdom and their king, Capricorn, held the wizard as his captive. Evil slowly came from this magic kingdom, bringing plagues, and even poisoning the food. The people of these lands begin to hate, and the peace was threatened. Eight champions have come to try and put an end to the darkness covering their land.

The backside of the box has the tagline, "The Gates of Hell are Open..." The cover illustration is by Peter Andrew Jones.

== Gameplay ==
Unlike most other games in the Gauntlet series, Gauntlet III is played from a 3D isometric perspective.

Gauntlet III differs from previous games due to the perspective change from a top-down view to an isometric projection, type view that would later be used in Gauntlet Legends and other Gauntlet games made after Legends. Its view is much like that of Solstice and games made with the Filmation engine. The player walks around various areas of each kingdom using mainly projectiles to kill enemies and also completing tasks that involve getting items that need to be carried from one area to another in order to complete the level. Each of the eight kingdoms have five areas giving a total of 40 areas, and the locations can be traversed from one area to the next. The enemies in this title, as in other Gauntlet games, come mostly from generators that keep producing the enemies until the generators are destroyed. Other elements from the series also make an appearance, such as potions that make enemies disappear or weaken them, food (both good and poisonous), invincibility amulets, and treasure chests, some of which can contain traps or other items the player would need.

Places like the forest and castle dungeons have obstacles such as logs and tables blocking the player's path, creating a maze-like area. Each area has at least one doorway or pathway to the next. At times certain things must be done in order to advance into the next area. To avoid the player being lost the programmers created a hand that appears from time to time, holding a note to remind the player what they are supposed to do; this clue feature is also an option to call up the clues. Another feature programmed into the game is a combination lock key code for which the player must consult a code wheel packaged with the game, needed to open certain doors; if someone made a pirated version of the game they wouldn't be able to get past that portion of the game without the Combination Key.

== Development ==
The Amiga and Atari ST versions of Gauntlet III: The Final Quest, as developed by Software Creations, began development in the Summer of 1990, and were released in the Spring of 1991 for the Amiga and Atari ST; an MS-DOS version was in development and announced for Spring 1991, but never released. Software Creations's development team originally conceived Gauntlet III as a 2D maze game like its arcade predecessors, but the team wanted something more original. David Broadhearst, Gauntlet III's development manager, said that Gauntlet III became a 3D game because "we'd never seen anybody do a really good 3D scrolling game with masking before - most of them are just static screens, generated one after the other - so we decided to do one which scrolls around like one big map".

Development first began on the Atari ST version, with this version planned to be ported to the Amiga, but this was soon reversed, due to the Amiga's hardware scrolling capabilities. Both the Amiga and Atari ST versions use a 16-color palette, although the introduction uses 32-colors. Gauntlet III is rendered in 16 colors due to the game's sprite masking.

Keeping track of items in the player's inventory was a difficult due to memory restrictions; because of this, the collectible potions in the original arcade games are cut, they are instead automatically used upon being collected. Gauntlet III's graphics were illustrated using OCP Art Studio by Paul Salmon and Chris Collins; Salmon predominantly worked on sprites, while Collins did backdrops.

== Reception ==
Reception

Review scores
Publication	Score
Sinclair User	85%
Your Sinclair	89%
The One	87% (Amiga)
Amiga Action	84% (Amiga)
CU Amiga	80% (Amiga)
Amiga Power	67% (Amiga)
Amiga Format	63% (Amiga)

Award
Publication	Award
Crash	Crash Smash

Most reviews praised the games graphics, but some found they were over used in many places with very little variation. And that the isometric perspective could result in the player's view being blocked. One of the games' main attractions was the well received music by video game composer Tim Follin.

British gaming magazine The One gave the Amiga version of Gauntlet III an overall score of 87%, praising the game's 3D perspective, graphic design, and soundtrack, but criticized it as unoriginal, but very fun.
