= Software Creations =

British video game developer

Acclaim Studios Manchester
- Formerly: Software Creations (1985–2002)
- Type: Subsidiary
- Industry: Video games
- Founded: 1985; 41 years ago
- Founder: Richard Kay
- Defunct: 27 August 2004; 22 years ago
- Fate: Dissolved
- Headquarters: Manchester, England
- Parent: Acclaim Entertainment (2002–2004)

Acclaim Studios Manchester (formerly Software Creations) was a British video game developer based in Manchester, England. The company was established in 1985 by Richard Kay. They were primarily known for their video games based on movie and comic licences like Marvel Comics, Cutthroat Island, Disney's Beauty and the Beast and the original titles Plok!, Solstice, and its sequel Equinox.

== History ==
According to Richard Kay, Software Creations began in 1986 when Steve Ruddy responded to an advertisement he had placed in the Manchester Evening News:

Steve and I hit it off right away. He worked from home, and he did a boxing game called The Big KO. We worked very closely with each other for about 12 months. I hired Mike Ager and Andrew Threlfall, and we were the first four at Software Creations. I got an office on Oxford Road and it was above a computer shop directly opposite the BBC. We did a lot of games for Firebird - they were all for about three or four hundred pounds.

— Richard Kay, Retro Gamer

Most of these early games were ports of budget titles to other platforms such as the Commodore 64, ZX Spectrum, Amiga, Atari ST, NES and the Game Boy. The company's breakthrough game was the Commodore 64 version of the arcade hit Bubble Bobble, a conversion which won critical acclaim and commercial success, and led to Software Creations being asked to do many more ports of popular arcade games. By this time the company had grown to include brothers Mike, Tim, and Geoff Follin, and artist Mark Wilson.

An early demo of Solstice won Software Creations a contract with Nintendo, leading to some high-profile NES and Super NES games.

During the mid-1990s, Software Creations was responsible for the development of sound tools used in the creation of music for the Nintendo 64 and its development systems, which was first created in 1995 for inclusion on Nintendo's development kit, and ended up being the standard sound driver used on most Nintendo 64 games.

In 1994, the company was sold to Bristol Coin Equipment, which was later renamed to Rage Software, and sold again in 1997 to Sweeplink Ltd.

On 1 May 2002, Acclaim announced that they had acquired Software Creations, which was renamed Acclaim Studios Manchester. At the time, Software Creations had approximately 70 employees. Acclaim Studios Manchester was closed as part of Acclaim Studios and all of its development facilities on 27 August 2004.

Rod Cousens and Barry Jafrato, who were chief executive officer and head of publishing for Acclaim, respectively, announced in September 2004 that they were planning to create Exclaim as a new video game publisher with the help of Europlay Capital Advisers. Exclaim was set to acquire and reinstantiate Acclaim's two UK studios, namely Manchester and Cheltenham, and re-employ their roughly 160 previous members. Exclaim's opening was expected on 11 October, however, Cousen's ownership over the two studios was challenged by Acclaim's liquidator, Allan Mendelsohn, leaving the UK staff in a state of limbo. A successor to Acclaim Studios Manchester, SilverBack Studios, was founded by Jon Oldham in April 2005 and employed 15 former Acclaim Studios Manchester staff.

== Games ==
As Software Creations
Year	Title	Platforms
1988	Aigina's Prophecy	Commodore 64
1988	Bionic Commando	Amiga, Amstrad CPC, Atari ST, Commodore 64, ZX Spectrum
1989	Ghouls 'n Ghosts	Amiga, Amstrad CPC, Atari ST, Commodore 64, ZX Spectrum
1989	Plotting	Amiga, Atari ST
1989	World Games	NES
1989	Sky Shark	NES
1990	Magic Johnson's Fast Break	NES
1990	Target: Renegade	NES
1990	Solstice	NES
1990	Pictionary	NES
1990	Silver Surfer	NES
1991	Indiana Jones and the Last Crusade	NES
1991	The NewZealand Story	NES
1991	Wolverine	NES
1991	Tom and Jerry (and Tuffy)	NES
1991	Altered Space	Game Boy
1991	Gauntlet III: The Final Quest	Amiga, Atari ST
1991	Treasure Master	NES
1992	Terminator 2: Judgment Day	NES
1992	Spider-Man and the X-Men in Arcade's Revenge	Super NES, Genesis, Game Gear
1992	Double Dragon 3: The Arcade Game	Genesis
1993	Blaster Master 2	Genesis
1993	Disney's Beauty and the Beast: Belle's Quest	Genesis
1993	Disney's Beauty and the Beast: Roar of the Beast	Genesis
1993	Plok!	Genesis (cancelled), Super NES
1993	The Incredible Crash Dummies	NES, Game Boy
1993	Thomas the Tank Engine & Friends	NES (cancelled), Super NES
1993	Equinox (Solstice 2)	Super NES
1994	Spider-Man and Venom: Maximum Carnage	Genesis, Super NES
1994	The Tick	Genesis, Super NES
1994	Ken Griffey Jr. Presents Major League Baseball	Super NES
1994	The Simpsons: Bart and the Beanstalk	Game Boy
1994	Tin Star	Super NES
1995	Venom/Spider-Man: Separation Anxiety	Genesis, Super NES
1995	Foreman for Real	Super NES
1995	Mortal Kombat 3	Game Boy, Game Gear, Master System
1996	Cutthroat Island	Super NES, Genesis, Game Boy, Game Gear
1997	Hexen: Beyond Heretic	Nintendo 64
1997	Wayne Gretzky's 3D Hockey '98	Nintendo 64, PlayStation
1998	The Rugrats Movie	Game Boy, Game Boy Color
1999	Carmageddon 64	Nintendo 64
1999	NASCAR 2000	Game Boy Color
1999	Boarder Zone	Game Boy Color
1999	Rugrats: Time Travelers	Game Boy Color
1999	Ken Griffey Jr.'s Slugfest	Game Boy Color
2000	Nicktoons Racing	Windows, PlayStation, Arcade
2000	NASCAR Racers	Windows
2000	Rugrats in Paris: The Movie	Game Boy Color
2001	The Simpsons: Night of the Living Treehouse of Horror	Game Boy Color
2001	Scooby-Doo and the Cyber Chase	Game Boy Advance
2001	Rugrats: Castle Capers	Game Boy Advance
2023	Moto-X	Super NES
Cancelled	Barbie: Vacation Adventure	Super NES, Genesis
Cancelled	Spiral Saga	PlayStation

As Creations
Year	Title	Platforms
2002	The Ripping Friends	Game Boy Advance
2002	All-Star Baseball 2003	Game Boy Advance
2002	2002 FIFA World Cup	GameCube, PlayStation, PlayStation 2, Windows, Xbox
2002	Stuart Little 2	Game Boy Advance
2002	Super Monkey Ball Jr.	Game Boy Advance

As Acclaim Studios Manchester
Year	Title	Platforms
2003	Gladiator: Sword of Vengeance	PlayStation 2, Windows, Xbox
2003	All-Star Baseball 2004	Game Boy Advance
Cancelled	Interview with a Made Man	PlayStation 2, Windows, Xbox
Cancelled	ATV Quad Power Racing 3	PlayStation 2, Xbox
