= Starsky & Hutch (disambiguation) =

Starsky & Hutch is an American action television series that originally aired from 1975 to 1979.

Starsky & Hutch also refers to:

- Starsky & Hutch (film), 2004 film starring Ben Stiller and Owen Wilson
- Starsky & Hutch (video game) based on the TV series
- "Starsky & Hutch", song by LL Cool J from the album Phenomenon (1997)
