= Pictionary (video game) =

1990 video game

- Cover art of Pictionary
- Developer: Software Creations
- Publisher: LJN
- Programmer: Tony Pomfret
- Artist: Craig Houston
- Composer: Tim Follin
- Platform: NES
- Release: NA: July 1990
- Genre: Board game
- Modes: Single-player, multiplayer

Pictionary: The Game of Video Quick Draw is a video game developed by Software Creations and published by LJN for the Nintendo Entertainment System.

Based on the board game of the same name, Pictionary has been noted in retrospect for its uncharacteristically enthusiastic soundtrack composed by Tim Follin, which was considered both high quality and unusual for a game of its type.

== Gameplay ==
The game can be played by either solo players, against the CPU, or in teams; correctly identifying drawings allows the player to roll a die to advance spaces on a game board.

If played against the CPU or with two players, the game utilizes predetermined drawings, and timed minigames are played to reveal segments of the drawing. If played in teams of two or more, then a "designated drawer" is chosen, which draws an image of a randomly-selected subject using the controller for their partner to guess. If it is correctly guessed, the user must use the honor system to tell the game whether or not the answer was guessed correctly.

When played in the "Alternate" mode, the designated drawer provides a subject of their own, and both teams may guess instead of just the drawer's team. At the end of a round, the game asks which team was successful in guessing, or if no one guessed correctly at all. If no one wins, then play moves on to the other team's designated drawer, and a new round begins. If a team guesses correctly, they may roll the virtual die and proceed down the board.

== Reception ==
Nintendo Power gave Pictionary a score of 3.5/5 for graphics and sound, 2.7/5 for play control, 3.1/5 for challenge, and 3/5 for theme and fun.

The soundtrack, composed by Tim Follin, has been the subject of retrospective commentary because of its unusually intense nature for a board game. Den of Geek called it "one of the greatest and strangest soundtracks in video game history", feeling it was more appropriate in a beat 'em up or a nightclub. Sonicstate praised Follin for his "outstanding use of limited musical resources" in creating the music.
