= Aighina no Yogen: From the Legend of Balubalouk =

1986 video game

- Family Computer cover art
- Developers: Vic Tokai; Software Creations (Commodore 64)
- Publisher: Vic Tokai
- Composers: Tim Follin (C64); Michiharu Hasuya (Famicom)
- Platforms: Family Computer; Commodore 64
- Release: Family Computer: JP: November 21, 1986; Commodore 64: NA: 1988; EU: 1988
- Genre: 2D action platformer
- Mode: Single-player

Aighina no Yogen: From the Legend of Balubalouk (アイギーナの予言 バルバルークの伝説より, Aigīna no yogen barubarūku no densetsu yori; lit. "Aighina's Prophecy: From the Legend of Balubalouk") is a Japan-exclusive video game for multiple platforms in 1986. This video game is the spiritual sequel to an arcade game known as Baluba-Louk No Densetsu, which was also only released in Japan.

== Gameplay ==
Gameplay screenshot

Jason, the game's main protagonist is sent to rescue Princess Laira, the daughter of Aighina (Aigiina). She is the only one knows how to use Aura Stars; which must be collected in five dungeons and re-united in the sixth. Players have to kill enough enemies to uncover a ladder in order to progress. Some stages also contain secrets and additional methods to continue in the game.

Passwords are available; allowing players the option of skipping the earlier portions.

A very early version of a partial English patch for a NES version was released before the translation project was completed, but the project never came to fruition. However, the game was eventually ported onto the Commodore 64 in all regions outside Japan.

A North American NES release was planned for 1988 and a fully translated prototype exists.
