= Magic Johnson's Fast Break =

1988 video game

- US Amiga release
- Developers: Arcadia Systems; Software Creations (NES)
- Publishers: Arcadia Systems; DRO Soft (Amstrad, Spectrum, MSX); Tradewest (NES); Melbourne House (Amiga, C64)
- Artist: Joe Hitchens
- Composers: NES version Tim Follin
- Platforms: Arcade, Amiga, Amstrad CPC, Commodore 64, MS-DOS, MSX, NES, ZX Spectrum
- Release: NA: 1988
- Genre: Sports (basketball)
- Modes: Single-player, multiplayer

Magic Johnson's Fast Break (alternatively titled Magic Johnson's Basketball) is a side-scrolling basketball sports game developed by Arcadia Systems and published in 1988. The game features the name and likeness of Los Angeles Lakers point guard Earvin "Magic" Johnson Jr., and was endorsed by PepsiCo.

In 1990 Tradewest published Software Creations' adaptation of the game for the Nintendo Entertainment System (NES). It was one of several celebrity-endorsed sports games published by Tradewest, and was promoted with a television advertisement campaign. An adaptation to the Apple IIGS was cancelled.

== Gameplay ==
The game features two generic basketball teams. Most versions of the game have one- and two-player modes. The NES version is one of a handful of NES software titles to support three- and four-player simultaneous play using either the NES Satellite or NES Four Score console accessories. The multiplayer modes allow competition in single games, but there is no tournament play.

== See also ==
- Double Dribble (1986)
- Super Slam Dunk (1993)
