= Chronos (1987 video game) =

Chronos: A Tapestry of Time
- Developer: The Radical Tubes
- Publisher: Mastertronic
- Composer: Tim Follin
- Platforms: ZX Spectrum, Amstrad CPC
- Release: 1987
- Genre: Shoot 'em up
- Mode: Single-player

Chronos (also known as Chronos: A Tapestry of Time) is a shoot 'em up developed by The Radical Tubes and published by Mastertronic for the ZX Spectrum and Amstrad CPC in 1987. The music was scored by Tim Follin. The game received mixed reviews upon release.

== Plot ==
Seven Ruling Lords create their own races, with Wodan creating man and Chronos creating the "Mystical Dimension Weavers".

== Development ==
The game was scored by the then fifteen-year old Tim Follin.

== Reception ==
Reception

Review scores
| Publication | Score |
|---|---|
| Amstrad Action | 45% |
| Crash | 55% |
| Sinclair User | 3/5 |
| Your Sinclair | 8/10 |

Chronos received mixed reviews.
