= Indiana Jones and the Last Crusade (1991 video game) =

- Developer: Software Creations
- Publisher: Taito America
- Designer: Michael Crick
- Programmers: John Seghers; Michael Crick
- Artist: Michael Crick
- Composers: Geoff Follin; Tim Follin
- Series: Indiana Jones
- Platform: Nintendo Entertainment System
- Release: NA: March 1991
- Genre: Action
- Mode: Single-player

Indiana Jones and the Last Crusade is a 1991 action video game for the NES, developed by Software Creations and published by Taito. The game is based on the 1989 film of the same name.

== Plot and gameplay ==
In the game, the player controls the protagonist, Indiana Jones, navigating through levels taken directly from the film. The game begins in the year 1938, with Jones receiving a package from Venice, Italy, which turns out to be his father's Grail diary. At the same time, he receives a telegram from Marcus Brody telling him the Cross of Coronado is on a ship off the coast of Portugal. The player can then choose between recovering the Cross of Coronado or going to Venice first.

If the player goes to recover the Cross, Jones must board a ship and defeat a certain number of Panama Hat's henchmen before fighting the boss himself. The player can also head to Venice where they are presented with a sliding puzzle challenge, which must be completed before a fire engulfs the room they are in. By solving the puzzle in time, the player receives a sketch showing the true Holy Grail. Jones then receives a telegram from Sallah telling him that Henry Jones, Sr. was taken captive by the Nazis and is being held at Castle Brunwald and that Marcus Brody has gone missing. After finishing the next mission, Jones receives another telegraph telling him the location of the Holy Grail.

Saving Marcus takes place on top of a German tank in Iskenderun, where the player has to kill Nazis before the tank plunges over a cliff. At Castle Brunwald, the player must navigate a dense maze to find Henry Jones Sr.

In several missions, if the player fails, it causes the Nazis to steal Henry's diary, and Jones must travel to Berlin to recover it via a motorcycle riding sequence.

The final level of the game takes place in the Lost Temple. The player must carefully navigate the floor to spell out the word 'Jehovah'; stepping on the wrong tile will fail the puzzle, and if the player takes too long, the torch goes out. Afterward, Jones will reach the final sanctum containing the Knight and several 'grails'. If the player has the sketch from Venice, it will help identify the correct Grail. Choosing the correct Grail will trigger the game's ending.

The game presents bitmapped pictures of the actors from the film of the same name, including Harrison Ford, Sean Connery, and Alison Doody.

== Reception ==
Robert Swan of Computer and Video Games gave the game an 89% rating. Swan commended the graphics, music, and sound effects, considering it to be among the best NES games released at the time. Similarly, Nintendo Power observed that the action scenes from the film were effectively adapted into the game. However, Skyler Miller of AllGame, while appreciating the graphics, music, and cutscenes expressed criticism towards the gameplay; resulting in a rating of two and a half out of five stars for the game.
