= Contradiction: Spot the Liar! =

2015 video game

- Developer: Baggy Cat
- Publisher: Baggy Cat
- Designer: Tim Follin
- Composer: Tim Follin
- Platforms: iOS, OS X, Windows, Amazon Fire TV
- Release: iOS: WW: 14 January 2015; OS X, Windows: WW: 10 July 2015; Amazon Fire: WW: 19 February 2017
- Genre: Adventure
- Mode: Single-player

Contradiction: Spot the Liar!, also known as Contradiction: The All-Video Murder Mystery Adventure, is an FMV game created by video game music composer Tim Follin and published by his company Baggy Cat. The game follows the investigation of Detective Inspector Frederick Jenks into the apparent suicide of Kate Vine in the small British village of Edenton. Its gameplay involves interviewing people and finding contradictions in their answers. Crowdfunded through Kickstarter with a total budget of just £6,000, the game was released for the iPad on 14 January 2015 and for Windows and Mac OS X on Steam on 10 July 2015. It was later released for Amazon Fire TV on 19 February 2017.

The concept for the game originated in the mid-1990s, when Follin and his brother Geoff had an idea for an audio-only investigative game, which evolved into a game concept incorporating live action video. However, the idea was abandoned when they realised the technology did not exist to execute it. With the release of the iPad, Follin realised it would be the perfect format for the game and he began working on it again in 2012. The script was written throughout 2013 and the main filming occurred within just 11 days in 2014. Roles were cast by John Guilor, most significant of which were Rupert Booth as the main character Detective Jenks and Blake's 7 star Paul Darrow as Paul Rand. Due to the game's low budget, Follin did all the post-production work himself and taught himself how to code so he could program the game.

The game received mixed reviews from critics upon release. Reviews generally praised the contradiction game mechanic, production value, and acting, although some critics did not enjoy the more campy performances. Criticism centred on poorly designed menus and other technical issues, as well as the ending which many found to be unsatisfying. Despite its mixed critical reception, Contradiction was a surprise success commercially and has since been credited as one of the factors behind the resurgence of FMV games. It has also been named among the best FMV games ever made.

== Gameplay ==
Contradiction is a murder mystery adventure game, played single-player, in which the player takes control of Detective Jenks while he investigates a death in the small village of Edenton. It is a full motion video (FMV) game, which means all of the scenes and locations are displayed using live action video instead of computer graphics. The main gameplay mechanic consists in interviewing characters and finding contradictions in their responses. The player has a list of subjects to ask interviewees about, each of which will play a cutscene when selected. Characters' answers are recorded as small snippets of information, and the player can pair conflicting statements to catch characters in lies and have Jenks question them further. This results in new pieces of information that can be used to question other characters. There is also a hint system if the player gets stuck, and clues are sometimes available by phoning the police chief from a phone box in the game.

The player can visit different characters by moving around the village using arrows onscreen to navigate or by selecting where to go on a map. A magnifying glass icon will sometimes appear in certain locations, which indicates an area can be searched for additional clues. When selected, Jenks will search the area and find items or additional pieces of information, which he can ask about in interviews. Some objects found by Jenks are used to advance the story, such as using a key found on the ground to unlock a padlocked door. Time advances when key points in the story are reached, beginning at 5pm and ending at midnight. At each hour, new locations, characters and events unlock. For example, new events can be found by exploring the village and will trigger when the player enters the right area, like unexpectedly encountering another person when Jenks explores the woods.

The interface for interviews: at the top are items and discussion topics, below are summaries of the response and a box for pairing contradictory statements

An example of navigation in the game: arrows allow the player to move location. At the bottom right is a magnifying glass icon indicating that the area can be searched for clues.

== Story ==
=== Setting and characters ===
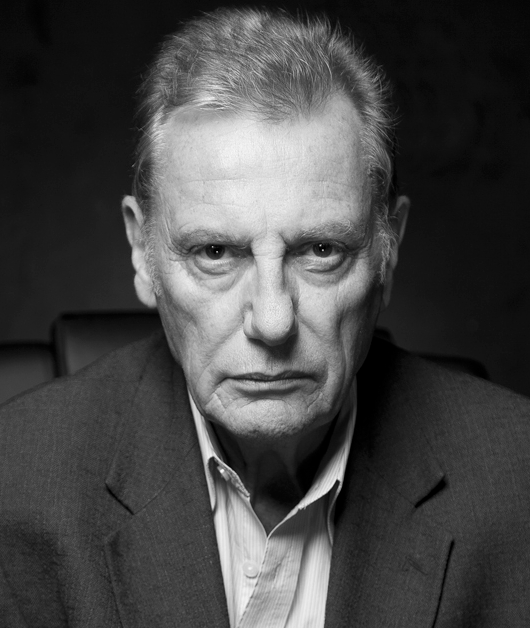
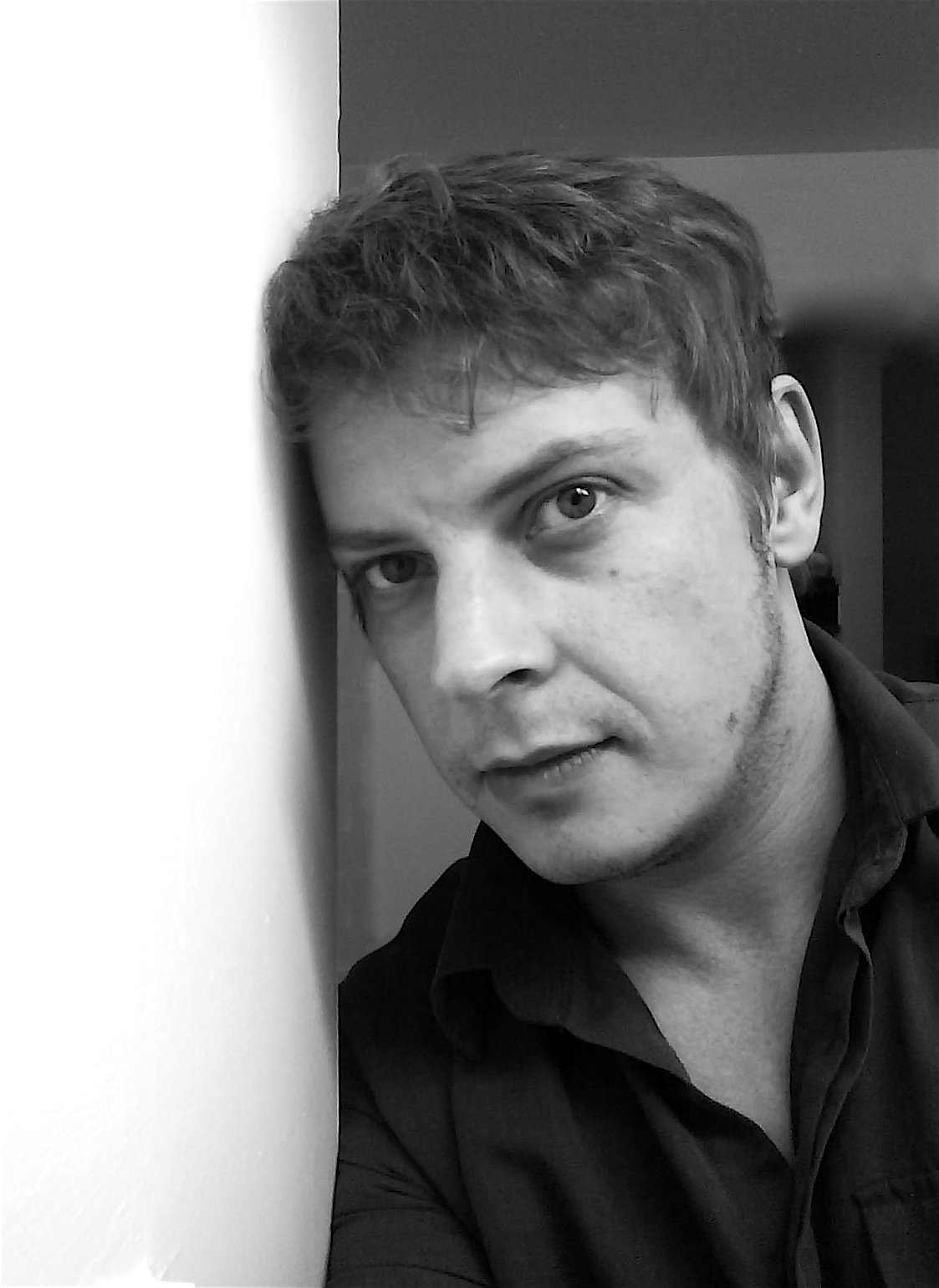
Cast members include Paul Darrow and John Guilor as Paul and Ryan Rand

Contradiction is set in the small British village of Edenton, where Detective Inspector Frederick Jenks (played by Rupert Booth) has been sent to investigate the death of a young woman named Kate Vine (Yvonne West). Initial evidence suggests suicide by drowning, but the presence of morphine in Kate's blood and her driver's licence being found on the other side of the lake to her body suggest foul play.

Kate had been attending a controversial business course known as ATLAS prior to her death, run by Ryan Rand (John Guilor) and his father Paul Rand (Paul Darrow). The course was also attended by Simon Thompson (Huld Martha). Simon's girlfriend Emma Bowman (Anarosa Butler) was a friend of Kate's. Ryan's wife is Rebecca Rand (Melanie Gray), who also owns the local pub. Conspiracy theorist James Wilson (Stephen Mosley) is a college friend of Simon. Additional characters include former ATLAS student Lisa Blint (Ellen Chivers), a local drunk (Chris Jackson), and an ATLAS student called Kyle (Daniel Alfieri).

=== Plot summary ===
Jenks arrives in the village of Edenton and interviews Simon Thompson about Kate's death. Simon tells Jenks he saw Kate at an ATLAS meeting last Friday, on the night of her death, but did not see her after the meeting. After discovering that Simon had known Kate for longer than he initially admitted, Jenks decides to visit the local pub. There he finds out about an argument on the night of Kate's death. Jenks discovers that Emma Bowman had been having an affair with Ryan Rand, and the argument in the pub was between Emma and Kate because Kate was blackmailing Ryan. Rebecca Rand claims not to know who had been arguing that night, which Jenks finds suspicious.

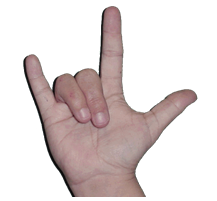
One of the cultish aspects of the ATLAS course discovered by Jenks is its use of a sign similar to the devil horns

Alongside investigating the pub argument, Jenks explores Edenton and meets James Wilson, who introduces him to scrying mirrors, which can supposedly be used to communicate with the dead. Jenks also uncovers strange elements of the ATLAS course, including its use of pagan masks and the sign of the horns. He meets a local drunk who tells him about a student, Liam, who drowned the previous year. James later claims Liam was killed by a cult called Third Eye, which had been creating and selling slaves under the guise of a life course.

Jenks meets Ryan Rand at ATLAS, who discusses ATLAS's philosophy of being free from guilt and his interest in satanism as a youth. Ryan admits ATLAS was formerly Third Eye but denies James' allegations. Ryan introduces Jenks to his father, Paul Rand, the formidable patriarch of the Rand family, before returning to ATLAS to run a class. However, when Jenks goes to investigate the class, he observes a doll-burning ceremony. He also finds a DVD of a pickpocketing stunt at ATLAS, but it is later stolen by a mugger. When Jenks confronts Paul, he confirms the DVD was part of an ATLAS risk-taking demonstration but denies involvement in the mugging.

While searching the pub's out building, Jenks finds photos of Ryan's car vandalised with the words "devil worshipers". Ryan attributes the vandalism to former ATLAS student Lisa Blint. Jenks finds Lisa in a rundown cottage on the other side of the village, where she tells him that ATLAS is possessing its students with demons. Jenks later discovers morphine prescriptions at the pub, which Rebecca says are for Ryan's arthritis. Though Ryan insists Kate could not have accessed them, Jenks learns she and Simon had access to the room where they were stored. He also learns Simon had been instructed to test Kate by pushing her to her limits and he had given her the morphine. Jenks gains access to the storeroom, but finds a bizarre mirror room with a CD about losing one's identity and the concept of extreme threshold testing.

At first Paul denies ATLAS's use of threshold testing, but is later pushed to admit it is used to create ruthless employees for big corporations. As Jenks leaves the Rand house, he overhears Paul telling Ryan to "get rid of" Jenks. Jenks witnesses what appears to be an attempted ritual sacrifice in the woods led by Ryan, but Ryan tells him it is a physical endurance test and accuses Simon of Kate's murder. Jenks confronts Simon, who tells him there is tape on Kate's driving license that belongs to Ryan, before running away. Jenks realises that the tape is the same as the tape used to cover the broken window at the pub and confronts Rebecca. Rebecca—who it is revealed had previously misheard the argument at the pub—confesses to murdering Kate due to the belief that Kate had been having an affair with Ryan, leading to her arrest.

== Development and release ==
Contradiction was written and developed by Tim Follin, who originally got into the video game industry by writing chiptune soundtracks to games in the 1980s and 90s. In the mid-1990s, Follin and his older brother Geoff conceived an idea for an investigative video game inspired by 1970s horror films produced by Hammer Films and the work of Stanley Kubrick. It was first envisioned as an audio-only game, but the concept later came to include video. However, due to limitations in technology that existed at the time, the project was abandoned. Follin eventually left the video game industry to work as a director of photography on independent short films and advertisements, founding his own video production company Baggy Cat.

It was only when Follin rediscovered the investigative game concept that he realised it was suited for a game on the iPad and he decided to pursue the idea again, beginning to seriously work on the central game mechanic in late 2012. Follin wanted to distance Contradiction from the linear gameplay of previous FMV games, which tended to revolve around a "choose what to do next" mechanic. Instead, Follin imagined the gameplay for Contradiction as combining statements like puzzle pieces, which evolved into the idea of pairing contradictory statements. Once he had solidified the concept, Follin wrote the script throughout 2013 and taught himself how to code so he would not have to pay a programmer to program the game. Based on previous script ideas he had, influences included the ideology of Ayn Rand, the idea of psychological conditioning, and the cult in The Wicker Man. Follin initially thought the game would be a demo but later decided that making a full game would not involve too much extra work, although the final game remained a shortened version of his original story idea.

Contradiction was successfully crowdfunded via Kickstarter in January 2014, gaining £4,010 in funding (around £3,400 after Kickstarter took their fees), but failed to reach the full amount Follin had aimed for. Additional funds, including money contributed by Follin himself, made up a total budget of £6,000. Follin stated that the low budget would limit the actors he could hire for the project and elements of the game had to be cut, including key plot points and more involved puzzles. As a result, Follin had to rework some aspects of the script to avoid plot holes. Follin had already cast John Guilor for the role of Ryan Rand and following the Kickstarter, Guilor cast the majority of the remaining roles. Although Chris Jackson played Jenks in the Kickstarter trailer, the role was given to Rupert Booth for the full game due to Jackson having other commitments. The cast was officially announced in February 2014. According to Bitpulse, the most significant actor announced was Paul Darrow, who had previously starred in Blake's 7 and appeared in shows such as Doctor Who.

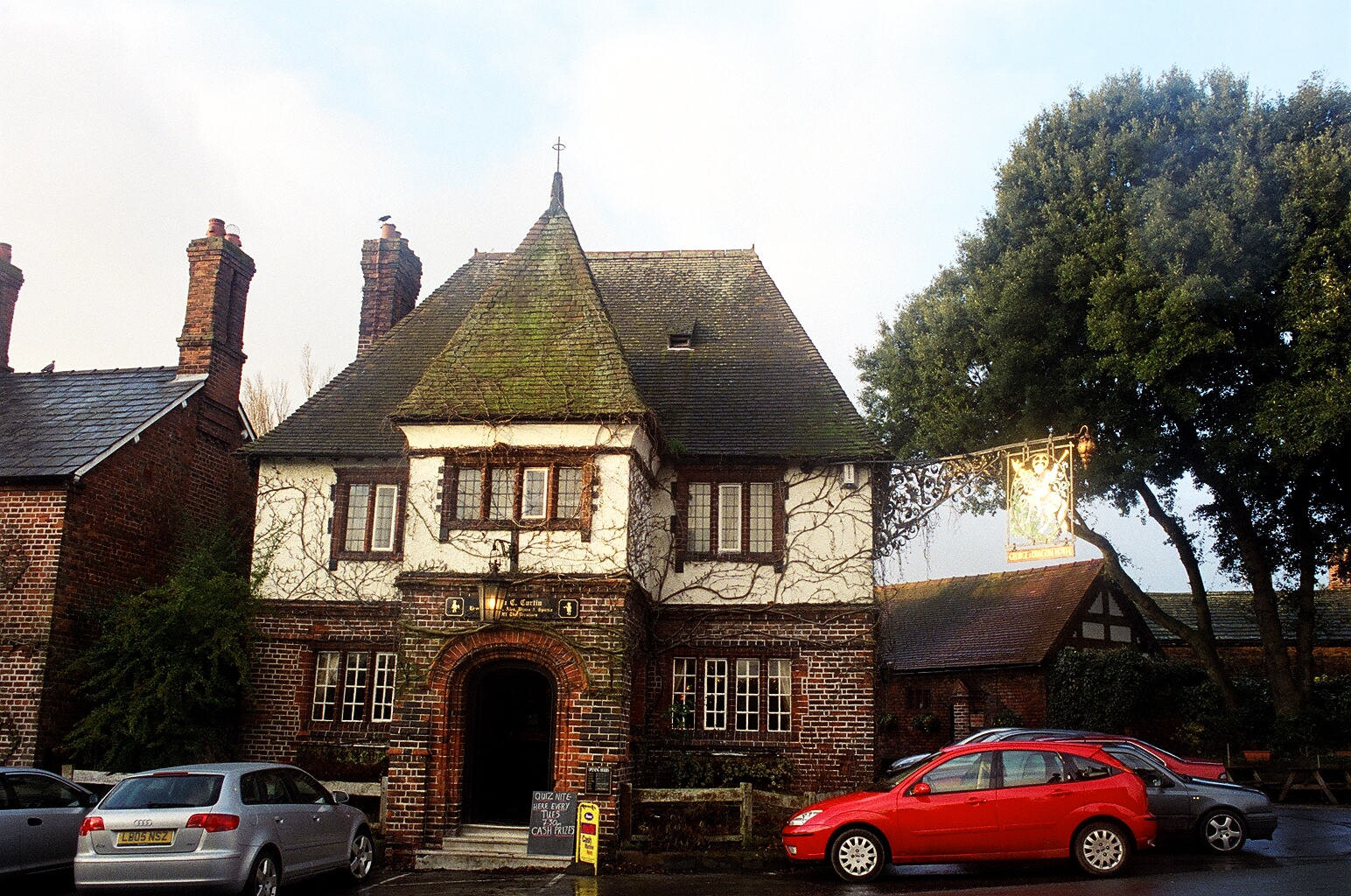
The game was filmed in the village of Great Budworth in Cheshire, North West England

The bulk of the game was shot on location in the village of Great Budworth in Cheshire in just 11 days, with additional scenes shot in St Helens and Mawdesley in Lancashire, United Kingdom throughout 2014. Follin encouraged actors to play roles in the way they thought was best, leading to a mix of straight and campy performances. According to Guilor, he intentionally acted over the top for his performance as Ryan and encouraged Booth to do the same for Jenks, particularly in their shared scenes. For Guilor, the campness of the performance was needed to retain interest for the player during some of the purely functional dialogue.

Once the filming was completed, Follin post-produced the footage, including editing scenes that were filmed during the day to look as if they were shot at night. According to Follin, one of the biggest challenges during post-production was the removal of background sound from the audio as there had been no sound recordist on set. He also created the soundtrack and programmed the game. The game was programmed in JavaScript and Titanium SDK was used to create the app for the iPad version. Follin had initially aimed to code the game within six months but it ended up taking over a year to complete. The game was released on 14 January 2015 for iPad on the Apple AppStore and on 10 July 2015 for Windows PC and Mac OS X on Steam. A version for Amazon Fire TV was released to the Amazon Appstore on 19 February 2017. The game was a surprise success for Baggy Cat, which Follin attributed to the game doing well on streaming websites like YouTube and Twitch, particularly due to a stream from the gaming site Giant Bomb.

== Critical reception ==
Reception

Aggregate score
| Aggregator | Score |
|---|---|
| Metacritic | 72/100 |

Review scores
| Publication | Score |
|---|---|
| Adventure Gamers | 3.5/5 (original release); 4/5 (QoL updates) |
| PC Gamer | 58/100 |
| 148Apps | 4/5 |
| Multiplayer.it (Italian) | 8.5/10 |
| Gamer.nl (Dutch) | 8/10 |

The PC version of Contradiction received "mixed or average" reviews according to review aggregator website Metacritic, with a weighted average score of 72/100 based on four critic reviews.

Reviewers generally found the contradiction mechanic rewarding; Tre Lawrence of 148Apps, for example, described the feeling of correctly identifying contradictory statements as "a rush". Steve Brown, writing for Adventure Gamers, agreed that finding contradictions could be satisfying, but felt the game could be disrupted if he could not identify a contradiction and felt the hints were often not helpful. In a more negative appraisal for Rock Paper Shotgun, John Walker described the mechanic as "deeply flawed" because it did not recognise many seemingly legitimate contradictions, which he felt led to guesswork when pairing statements. A few reviews complained about other aspects of the gameplay, such as the magnifying glass icon being used to search a scene, which some reviewers found unengaging.

The footage was broadly described as professional and high quality, (Note: Reception for the audio quality was more mixed. Rock Paper Shotgun claimed some scenes were "very poorly recorded" while Adventure Gamers said there was "clear, crisp audio" throughout the game.) and Justin McElroy of Polygon praised the "seeping, atmospheric score". Reviews also largely praised the calibre of acting, with descriptions varying from "credible" and "decent" to "enjoyably cheesy" and "generally excellent". McElroy compared the performances to the "schmaltzy" acting present in soap operas, describing them as fun and more difficult to pull off than they at first appear. He praised the performances of John Guilor and Paul Darrow in particular, finding them to be "deliciously campy and smarmy villains". However, Rupert Booth's performance as Detective Jenks had a more mixed reception. McElroy described Booth's performance as "whimsically idiosyncratic" while Leigh Alexander of Offworld called it "inescapably glib, funny and gleeful" and Christopher Livingston of PC Gamer called it "delightfully overly-expressive". But Rock Paper Shotgun's review argued it was out of place with the tone of the game and Adventure Gamers' called it "hammy" and "overenthusiastic". Although some reviewers enjoyed the overall story, the ending was generally seen as underwhelming.

A number of reviews complained about technical issues or badly designed interfaces. Complaints included strange button mappings, poor controls for PC (one reviewer felt the game had been "hastily ported to PC"), and a lack of autosaves leading to progress being lost. Justin McElroy for Polygon, for instance, found the keyboard controls on the original PC release hard to use, but felt mouse controls added in a later version were a big improvement. Reviewers also felt that the interface for interviews could get cluttered as more pieces of evidence were found and there were more statements to look through. Some reviews also found the navigation disorienting as some locations in the game are shown from different angles depending on where they are entered from. Christopher Livingston of PC Gamer felt this was worsened by the need to re-investigate areas once new events had unlocked, and John Walker of Rock Paper Shotgun complained of the need to "endlessly traipse back and forth through the village". However, other reviews were more positive, such as 148Apps' review which enjoyed how the game expanded over time, and Offworld's which felt this aspect of the game encouraged inventive gameplay.

== Legacy and possible sequel ==
On its release, some reviews for Contradiction described it as a new step for FMV games. Polygon stated that with Contradiction's release, the FMV genre, that had largely never worked before, was "beginning to find its place". 148Apps similarly claimed that "murder mystery point and click adventures won't be the same". At the 2016 Independent Games Festival, Contradiction received an honourable mention for the Excellence in Narrative award. The game has since come to be cited as one of the games that spurred on the resurgence of FMV games, alongside Her Story. It has also been described as one of the best FMV games ever made by outlets such as TheGamer and VG247, and as one of the best games of 2015 by Giant Bomb.

After the release of Contradiction in 2015, Follin expressed interest in making a sequel to the game but noted it would depend on how much money Contradiction made. In particular, Follin worried about the potential work that would have to go into a sequel, particularly since Contradiction had relied on him working strenuously on almost every aspect of the game. He felt that for a sequel to ever happen, he would need to amass a suitable budget to hire people to work on the game so he could spread the workload. Since Contradiction had to make sacrifices to its story and gameplay due to its low budget, Follin also wanted to make sure the budget for a sequel would allow it to be more ambitious. As of 2023, Follin stated he was still interested in making a sequel but did not know how to resolve the story in a satisfying way.
