= Black Lamp (video game) =

1988 video game

- Publishers: Firebird Software; Atari Corporation
- Platforms: Amiga, Atari 8-bit, Atari ST, Commodore 64, ZX Spectrum
- Release: February 1988
- Genre: Platform
- Mode: Single-player

Black Lamp is a platform game, originally published by Firebird Software for the Amiga, Atari ST, Commodore 64 and ZX Spectrum computers in 1988, and later published by Atari Corporation for the Atari 8-bit computers in 1989.

The Atari ST version was included in the Atari ST Power Pack, a collection of 20 games which came with some editions of the computer system.

== Plot ==
The game casts the player as Jack The Jester in the fictional kingdom of Allegoria. According to the story, Jack has fallen in love with the Princess Grizelda, but knows the king would never allow his daughter to marry a lowly court jester.

Unless, of course, he were to perform some kind of noble and heroic act.

That chance comes for Jack the day a gang of dragons attack the kingdom, stealing the magical black lamp which protects the kingdom from harm.

Without the lamp's protection the kingdom is soon overrun by monsters, so Jack sets off to recover the black lamp, save the kingdom, and hopefully win the hand of the fair princess.

== Gameplay ==
Black Lamp gameplay (Atari ST)

The game is viewed from the side-on perspective typical of platform games. Jack, under the player's control, has to run, jump, climb and shoot his way through the kingdom of Allegoria in search of nine different coloured lamps, while under constant assault by all manner of creatures.

Eight of the nine lamps may be found randomly scattered around the kingdom (in locations which change with each new game), but the ninth lamp, the black lamp, is guarded by a dragon which must be defeated before the lamp can be recovered.

Each lamp must be returned to one of several lamp racks in the kingdom. As the player can only carry a single lamp at a time, this can mean a lot of traveling back and forth. Once all the lamps have been returned to the rack, the level is complete, and the player advances to the next level.

The game takes place across a series of static and scrolling rooms, which are connected by doorways leading into the foreground or background, as well as up down, left and right.

Several items can be picked up to assist the player

- Food replenishes the player's health
- Collecting five weapons gives the player temporarily increased firepower.
- Collecting five musical instruments temporarily allows the player to fall from heights without being hurt.
- Collecting five jewels gives the player temporary invincibility.

Controlling Jack can be difficult, as unlike many more modern platform games like Mario or Sonic where the character responds immediately to joystick input, Black Lamp moves the player in set increments of distance, so if the player starts walking in one direction, Jack cannot stop or turn around until he has taken a full step in that direction.

== Music ==
In the Atari ST and Amiga versions of Black Lamp, the title screen music is a version of Elizabethan Serenade by Ronald Binge, while the in-game music is a rendition of the English folk song Greensleeves. In the ZX Spectrum and C64 versions, the title screen music is an original piece by Tim Follin.

== Reception ==
Black Lamp was generally well received by reviewers, with many praising the game's graphics and animation. Main criticisms of the game were its high difficulty level, and difficult control system.

Computer and Video Games, issue 77 awarded the ST version 5/5 stating that "each screen is beautifully illustrated and populated with some really amazing creatures, all brilliantly animated".

Commodore User, August 1988, gave the Amiga version 7/10, and described the scenery as "beautifully detailed".

Zzap!64 issue 36 gave the Commodore 64 version 78/100, citing "startlingly good graphics", but "high difficulty level and awkward control".
