= Tim Follin =

English video game music composer

- Born: Timothy John Follin; 19 December 1970 (age 55); St Helens, Lancashire, England
- Genres: Electronic, new age, orchestral, rock, progressive rock, chiptune, video game music
- Occupations: Composer arranger programmer
- Instruments: Piano/keyboard, guitar, violin
- Years active: 1985–2006, 2015–present
- Labels: C64Audio.com (formerly High Technology Publishing)
- Spouse: Clare Follin (m. 2003)
- Website: Baggy Cat LTD

Timothy John Follin (born 19 December 1970) is an English video game music composer, cinematographer, visual effects artist and game developer, who has written tracks for a variety of titles and home gaming systems, including the ZX Spectrum, Commodore 64, Amiga, Atari ST, Nintendo Entertainment System, Mega Drive, Super Nintendo Entertainment System, Game Boy, Dreamcast, and PlayStation.

Among Follin's works are the soundtracks to Solstice, Silver Surfer, Spider-Man/X-Men: Arcade's Revenge, Plok!, and Ecco the Dolphin: Defender of the Future.

Follin has also co-founded a TV advertising company called ABF Pictures and a general-purpose media company called Baggy Cat Ltd, which to date has produced two video games, Contradiction and At Dead of Night.

== Video game career ==
=== Insight Studios ===
As a child, Follin had no significant music training. Leaving Liverpool's Sandown Music College after one year of studies, Follin's career began at the age of 15 working at Insight Studios. Follin ended up in video games due to his older brother Mike Follin learning how to program for the ZX Spectrum and obtaining professional work at Insight. After developing a pulse-width modulation effect Tim wrote the music driver and soundtrack for their first professional game, Subterranean Stryker, followed by an arrangement of Stravinsky's "The Firebird", used for the game Star Firebirds. Follin then developed a three-channel sound routine which he used to create the music for his third soundtrack, Vectron. He then went on to create 4- and 5-channel music for games such as Chronos and Agent X. In his early career, Follin's music was praised in magazine game reviews.

Follin's sole game programming credit (not counting music drivers) came with his fourth title, Future Games, where he created one minigame of the several featured.

=== Software Creations ===
Hired by Richard Kay, Tim followed brother Mike in moving to Software Creations in 1987, his first full-time job, where he spent a significant portion of his career. Follin's arranged soundtrack to Bubble Bobble was his first written for a soundchip, the AY-3-8910.

Follin wrote the music for Black Lamp in one night after a bout of writer's block.

Within the level 1 music of Ghouls'n Ghosts for the Amiga is a voice sample played backwards saying "secret authority", considered nothing more than a joke by Follin. Alongside Ghouls'n Ghosts, two other Amiga soundtracks, Sly Spy and Puzznic, were presented in the Amiga music format "Follin Player II". To arcade soundtrack arrangements like Bionic Commando and Ghouls'n Ghosts, Follin added richer sound palette and occasionally composed some new songs (the title music of Ghouls'n Ghosts).

Follin described the NES title Solstice as "a very inspiring game to do music for," demanding atmospheric music within the game's dark castle environment, as well as powerful music choreographed with the title sequence. Follin did not use a keyboard or any instruments for the Solstice soundtrack, composing while "thinking along the lines of the computer and not [...] a keyboard." Follin felt the programming-only approach allowed him to work with "a more open mind".

In a 1990 interview, Follin expressed "a bit of desolation" over the prospect of no longer composing for the Commodore 64, stating "I don't see myself staying with this machine," perhaps sensing the transition occurring in the European gaming marketplace as the third generation of video and computer game platforms reached its end. Follin's final Commodore 64 release came with 1991's Gauntlet III.

Beside contributing the soundtrack with brother Geoff, Follin recorded live sound effects for 1993 SNES title Thomas the Tank Engine & Friends.

Citing a declining work environment, Follin departed Software Creations in 1993 (with his final title there being Rock N' Roll Racing).

=== Malibu Interactive and freelancing ===
After leaving Software Creations, Follin joined Malibu Interactive for 18 months. While working for Malibu, Follin provided the soundtrack for Time Trax on the Sega Mega Drive and (along with brother Geoff) Prime for the Sega CD, doing "virtually nothing and getting paid" for the following year before winding up out of work. Another title composed alongside brother Geoff, Firearm, went unpublished. Follin would spend the remainder of his video game career as a freelancer. Following Malibu Interactive's collapse, Follin then worked with groups that made unsuccessful game pitches to Psygnosis and the BBC. Follin provided part of the soundtrack for Batman & Robin, developed by Probe.

Follin joined the development team of Ecco the Dolphin: Defender of the Future as the title's lead composer around mid-1998, leaving Attila Heger no longer responsible for providing the entirety of the soundtrack. (Heger was made primarily responsible for scoring the game's cutscenes.) Follin had been offered the composer position by Sega UK producer David Nulty, who was a fan of Follin's Commodore 64 work. The soundtrack received very favourable reviews from Edge, DC-UK, and Official Dreamcast Magazine.

The 2003 multiplatform release Starsky & Hutch was given a funk-style score by Follin, who said at the time, "This is the project I had hoped I would get one day. I've always loved Starsky & Hutch and it's [sic] original title music." While with Software Creations, Follin had previously arranged the Starsky & Hutch television series' theme as the title music to the 1991 NES release Treasure Master.

=== End of video game career and return ===
Around August 2005, Follin announced on his website "with much delight" that he had chosen to stop composing music for video games, citing its irregular work not providing a substantial income, light-heartedly adding that the situation caused him "distress and illness". The tenuous nature of game development caused several instances of Follin being hired and subsequently having the project shelved. Follin noted that Starsky & Hutch had been in development for around three years before eventually being released.

Towards the end of 2012 Follin decided to dust off an idea originally conceived as an interactive audio adventure game and reworked the concept as a video-based adventure game called Contradiction, which he designed and scripted, then filmed and programmed, also composing the game's soundtrack. The game was subsequently released on iPad and later on Steam. Follin then worked on another game, At Dead of Night, again using the FMV format but this time in the horror game genre, which was released at the end of 2020. In mid-2021, a playthrough of At Dead of Night was created by gaming YouTuber Markiplier, leading to a surge in popularity. A sequel is now in the works.

His brothers Geoff Follin and Mike Follin also worked in the video game industry as musician and programmer respectively, with both having moved on to other careers. Much like his brothers, Follin has changed careers, choosing to pursue films, television advertising, graphic design, visual effects and game design. Follin never considered himself a gamer as much as a musician or developer.

=== Game credits ===
Game	Release date	Platform(s)	Notes
At Dead of Night	2020	Windows	
Contradiction: Spot the Liar!	2015	iOS, Windows, OS X	
Lemmings	2006	PlayStation Portable, PlayStation 2, PlayStation 3	
Ford Racing 3	2005	PlayStation 2, Xbox, Windows, Nintendo DS	co-composers: Muddy Funkers, Paul Stroud
Future Tactics: The Uprising	2004	PlayStation 2, GameCube, Xbox, Windows	
Ford Racing 2	2003	PlayStation 2, Xbox, Macintosh, Windows	co-composer: Bjørn Lynne
Starsky & Hutch	2003	PlayStation 2, Xbox, Windows, GameCube	sound, additional storyline; co-composers: Dave Sullivan, Matthew Costello
Ecco the Dolphin: Defender of the Future	2000 (2002: PS2)	Dreamcast, PlayStation 2	co-composer: Attila Heger (cutscenes)
Bust-A-Move 4	1999	Game Boy Color	arranger, co-arranger: Andy Brock
South Park (cancelled)	1998	Game Boy Color	arranger, co-composers/co-arrangers: Andy Brock, Steve Rockett
Batman & Robin	1998	PlayStation	film score arrangements (no compositions)
WWF War Zone	1998	Game Boy	
Firearm (cancelled)	1995	PC	co-composer: Geoff Follin
Ultraverse Prime	1995	Sega CD	co-composer: Geoff Follin
Batman Forever	1995	Mega Drive/Genesis, Super NES	co-composer: Geoff Follin (Super NES)
Ken Griffey Jr. Presents Major League Baseball	1994	SNES	arranger; co-composers/co-arrangers: Geoff Follin, Chris Jojo, Paul Tonge, Matthew Cannon
Moto-X (completed, unreleased)	1994	SNES	co-composer: Geoff Follin
Time Trax	1993	Sega Mega Drive	music driver designer, game never released
Thomas the Tank Engine & Friends	1993	SNES	arranger; co-composer/co-arranger: Geoff Follin
Rock N' Roll Racing	1993	SNES	music driver designer, arranger; co-composer/co-arranger: Geoff Follin
Equinox	1993	SNES	co-composer: Geoff Follin
Plok!	1993	SNES	co-composer: Geoff Follin
Super Off Road	1992	SNES	co-composer: Geoff Follin
Spider-Man/X-Men: Arcade's Revenge	1992	Super NES, Genesis	co-composer: Geoff Follin
The Incredible Crash Dummies	1992	Game Boy, Game Gear, Master System	co-composer: Geoff Follin, music conversion: Matt Furniss (GG, SMS)
Gauntlet III	1991	Commodore 64, Amiga, ZX Spectrum	co-composer: Geoff Follin (C64, Spectrum)
Indiana Jones and the Last Crusade (Taito version)	1991	NES	
Treasure Master	1991	NES	
The New Zealand Story (known in America as Kiwi Kraze)	1991	NES	co-composer: Geoff Follin
Tom & Jerry (and Tuffy)	1991	NES	co-composer: Geoff Follin
Pictionary	1990	NES	
Silver Surfer	1990	NES	co-composer: Geoff Follin
Solstice	1990	NES	
Sky Shark	1989	NES	
Ghouls'n Ghosts	Dec 1989	Amiga, Commodore 64, Atari ST	arranger, composer
Qix	1989	Commodore 64, Amiga	
Magic Johnson's Fast Break	1989	Commodore 64, NES	
Chester Field	1989	Commodore 64	
Missile Ground Zero	1989	ZX Spectrum	
Solar Invasion	1989	ZX Spectrum	
L.E.D. Storm	Feb 1989	Amiga, Commodore 64, Atari ST, ZX Spectrum	
Bionic Commando	June 1988	Amiga, Commodore 64, ZX Spectrum, Atari ST	arranger
Target: Renegade	1988	NES	arranger
Sky Shark	1988	Commodore 64, NES	arranger
Peter Pack Rat	1988	Commodore 64, ZX Spectrum	arranger
Bodyslam	1988	Commodore 64	
Psycho Pigs UXB	1988	Commodore 64, ZX Spectrum	co-composer: Geoff Follin (C64)
Aigina's Prophecy	1988	Commodore 64	
Star Paws	1988	ZX Spectrum	arranger
Raw Recruit	1988	Commodore 64, ZX Spectrum	
Black Lamp	Apr 1988	Commodore 64, ZX Spectrum	
Bubble Bobble	Oct 1987	ZX Spectrum, Atari ST	arranger
Renegade	1987	Amiga, Atari ST	arranger
Scumball	1987	Commodore 64	
Agent X II: The Mad Prof's Back	1987	Commodore 64, ZX Spectrum	
Chronos	1987	ZX Spectrum	
The Sentinel	Mar 1987	ZX Spectrum	
Agent X	1986	ZX Spectrum	
Future Games	June 1986	ZX Spectrum	
Vectron	Oct–Dec 1985	ZX Spectrum	
Star Firebirds	Oct 1985	ZX Spectrum	arranger
Subterranean Stryker	Mar 1985	ZX Spectrum	

== Thoughts on video game music ==
Follin's methodology of music was that music is "basically an unconscious experience" that does not and should not "engage your intellect". Rather, Follin believed game music was "more of a sort of atmospheric thing" and had "always written music to be part of something else", intending for the video game (or other media the music is composed for) to provide the image or scene of context.

Within his personal experience, Follin always found the hardest part of creating music to be the concept phase, saying "I probably tear my hair out more over arrangement than over anything else." The easiest part was the execution of the solidified concepts.

Follin felt the idea of computer music was "a silly one to begin with", as soundchips from the earliest platforms (e.g. ZX Spectrum) were only meant to produce sound effects. As early as 1994, Follin expressed his desire to move away from scoring video games and transition to films, stating that he preferred never to work with chip-generated music again along with his hopes that the games industry would not move backwards from the emerging standard of CD audio. Whether dealing with the audio limitations of older consoles or a game's narrow style guidelines when composing for modern soundtracks, Follin regarded the challenge of creating music within constraints to be an interesting part of working in video game music.

During his game music career, Follin never had the mood or interest to join any demoscene groups. Though Follin knew few fellow video game composers, he highly respected Richard Jacques for the amount of work put into his music.

=== Influences ===
Follin cited progressive rock as well as many musicians (including Quincy Jones, Jethro Tull, Led Zeppelin, and John Martyn) as having had some casual or subconscious influence on his music, and has also enjoyed music by Deep Purple and Guns N' Roses. However, he did not feel that any specific artist or style had been a primary inspiration during his career. Follin acknowledged that in one instance he went for a more contemporary style when scoring the award-winning soundtrack to Bionic Commando, actively choosing to mimic other people's music for fear of potentially losing his job.

The soundtrack to Ecco the Dolphin: Defender of the Future may have been influenced by the works of American minimalist composer John Adams, whom Follin explicitly acknowledged as a current influence during the time he was completing the soundtrack, citing Adams' work as "the only minimalist stuff I've heard which struck a chord with me."

Follin did not have much time to listen to the work of his musical contemporaries while in the video games industry, a situation he implied as having been a benefit to his career. Follin speculated that in actively listening to those works, he likely ran the risk of encountering ideas he had not thought of and subsequently becoming discouraged and/or prone to copycatting.

=== Personal view of work ===
Particularly in the earlier days of his career, Follin often composed game soundtracks while the games themselves were still in the writing stages, meaning that there was usually no frame of reference or genre objective in mind. Follin himself humorously felt these situations created many instances where the soundtrack was unsuited to the game, though at the time neither he nor any game developers had any issues. Given another chance, Follin said he would have given more effort toward making his earlier soundtracks better suited to the games, feeling that his failure to do so (despite the compositional quality) likely cost him future work. Back then, Follin instead focused on exploring the various consoles' audio limitations. The technical limitations of the most primitive video game system soundchips made Follin's primary goals to create original sounds as well as not allow the resulting music to sound poor.

Follin also never had the interest to join a demoscene group, though, near the end of his time working with Commodore platforms, he claimed he enjoyed himself when he made music. Outside of Ghouls'n Ghosts however, Follin later described his Commodore 64 work as nonsense that he was not particularly happy with.

Follin noted Ghouls'n Ghosts on the Commodore 64 as his favourite work, though the game was a known entity, unlike many of Follin's early projects. Software Creations programmer Steve Ruddy, who created the music driver for the game (with design input from Follin) recalled Follin describing a wide array of imagery for the title theme. For the Ghouls'n Ghosts soundtrack, Follin retained parts of Tamayo Kawamoto's original arcade soundtrack within most tracks, only to transition into his own ideas for other portions of those tracks. Similar circumstances resulted in Follin's soundtrack for Bionic Commando.

Follin has found it difficult to listen to works he created, feeling them to be outdated by the time they were completed. Follin disliked working with the Atari ST and the ZX Spectrum's AY chip, feeling the NES had more character. While not feeling very successful composing music for the Amiga, Follin enjoyed working on soundtracks for the SNES and Commodore 64. He described writing for the C64's SID chip as "playing an instrument in its own right", appreciating the analogue sound it produced, despite having only three channels to work with. Follin also recalled the SNES's Spider-Man/X-Men: Arcade's Revenge being fun due to the inclusion of cheesy '70s guitar synths and brass synths.

Despite not considering himself adept at any live instruments, and composing several soundtracks beyond the fifth generation of video game consoles using samples, Follin disliked sampled music. Instead, Follin strove to make his music sound as close to live instrumentation as possible. His most notable work using sampled instruments was the soundtrack to Ecco the Dolphin: Defender of the Future, an experience he enjoyed, but also felt frustrated with on account of "a lack of equipment and resources – such as a string orchestra and choir!" Follin finds orchestral music inherently more human-sounding and listenable.

=== Fandom ===
Several contemporaries of Follin's have cited him as an inspiration or top composer including Richard Jacques, Jesper Kyd, David Wise, Frédéric Motte, Markus Schneider, Matt "Gasman" Westcott, Ramiro "Extremer" Vaca, graphic artist Haydn Dalton, and programmer Dean Belfield. Frequent Software Creations collaborator Steve Ruddy, who programmed music drivers used by Follin with Follin's design input, marvelled "I had no idea how he made it do what it did," and described his music as "astonishing".

Regarding fan communities dedicated to arranging video game music, including his own, Follin remarked, "It's really good. A lot of the stuff, you just think 'Well, that's much better than what I would have done... could do now.'" Follin is consistently mentioned as a favourite composer among European musicians within the Commodore arrangement scene.

Alongside the music of fellow video game music composer Rob Hubbard, Follin's musical work in games was spotlighted in listening stations of the worldwide Game On exhibition, organised by the Barbican Art Gallery.

== Media production career ==
Follin has written, directed, produced, and composed for two short films: Body Counting and The Sun Circle. Body Counting won the Best Short Film under £5,000 award at the Salford Film Festival in November 2004.

Since semi-retiring from video game music composition, Follin has gone on to work in the television industry, working as director of photography for TV ads and dramas, as well as creating graphics, CGI, and music for commercials. In April 2010, Follin joined Matt Barraclough and Paul Ambler to form ABF Pictures Ltd., a company making TV commercials, web videos, and music promos. In 2013, he started a company to embrace his various interests and skills, called Baggy Cat Ltd.

== Personal life ==
Follin has expressed that he does not use recreational drugs, perhaps counter to inferences made by fans of his music.

Follin considers writing therapeutic.

=== Family ===
Tim is married and has two school-age children. Tim, son of Marjorie Follin, was the youngest of three brothers, all of whom had careers in the video game industry. Oldest brother Michael Stuart (Mike) moved on after 16 years as a programmer to become an ordained minister in the Church of England. Middle brother Geoffrey Mark (Geoff), a fellow game composer who was proficient in several instruments, MIDI software, and reading sheet music, later went on to become a primary school teacher and later a part-time maths tutor while occasionally composing music; he died of pancreatic cancer in May 2024.
