= The Simpsons: Night of the Living Treehouse of Horror =

2001 video game

- North American box art
- Developer: Software Creations
- Publisher: THQ
- Producer: Trevor B
- Programmers: Matt Green; James McKay; Danny Whelan
- Artist: Martin Holland
- Writer: Jamie Angell
- Composer: Suddi Raval
- Series: The Simpsons
- Platform: Game Boy Color
- Release: NA: March 19, 2001; PAL: April 20, 2001
- Genre: Platform
- Mode: Single player

The Simpsons: Night of the Living Treehouse of Horror is a platform game published by THQ on March 19, 2001, for the Game Boy Color. Developed by Software Creations, it is based on the Treehouse of Horror episodes of the animated television series The Simpsons. The game features seven side-scrolling levels in which the player controls the members of the Simpson family. Night of the Living Treehouse of Horror has received average reviews from critics, with praise directed at the design.

== Gameplay ==
The Simpsons: Night of the Living Treehouse of Horror is a side-scrolling platformer. The game features seven levels, each one of which re-creates a tale from the annual Treehouse of Horror episodes of the American animated television series The Simpsons. All five members of the Simpson family have their own level, with the exception of Homer, who has three. The levels include Marge in a zombie tale, Maggie as a fly, Lisa fighting cannibalistic teachers, Bart rescuing Santa's Little Helper in a haunted house, and Homer as a vampire killer, a robot, and the large ape King Homer.

== Development ==
Night of the Living Treehouse of Horror was developed by Software Creations and published by THQ. Software Creations began developing the game before the May 2000 Electronic Entertainment Expo (E3), but since it was only in its early stages when the expo took place, it was not displayed there.

== Reception ==
Reception

Aggregate score
Aggregator	Score
GameRankings	74%

Review scores
Publication	Score
Game Informer	7.5/10
GameSpot	7.8/10
GameZone	8/10
Hyper	4/10
IGN	6/10

Night of the Living Treehouse of Horror received generally positive reviews according to the review aggregation website GameRankings with an average score of 74%.

IGN's Craig Harris said that it "is a better-than-average platformer for the Game Boy Color" and has "some decent design elements". He added, however, that he thought the game got boring towards the end: "The difficulty is certainly there — it's not an easy game to play, and you won't be whisking through this title in an afternoon. It starts out clever and decent enough, as the first few levels are a good and fun challenge. Most of the levels, though, are based on the first level's side-scroller, and by the time I got to the first Homer level, I was getting quite bored." Cam Shea of Hyper, more unfavorably, also felt players would quickly grow disinterested by its overuse of recycled elements of other games. Frank Provo of GameSpot, on the other hand, wrote that "each level [...] is a game unto itself, which makes for a rather pleasing and varied experience." He praised the game for being "colorfully drawn, highly detailed, and smoothly animated," and for the video game references featured in it. He disliked, however, that it "uses an unwieldy password system, making it unnecessarily tedious to continue a game."
