= Barbie: Vacation Adventure =

1994 video game

- Sega Genesis cover art
- Developer: Software Creations
- Publisher: Hi Tech Entertainment
- Designer: Neil Raine
- Series: Barbie
- Platforms: Sega Genesis, Super NES
- Release: WW: November 12, 2026 (Note: Via the Barbie Rewind compilation)
- Genres: Sports, minigame compilation
- Modes: Single-player, multiplayer

Barbie: Vacation Adventure is minigame compilation sports video game that takes Barbie on educational field trips throughout the United States. Originally planned to launch in 1994 on Sega Genesis and Super Nintendo Entertainment System, the game went unreleased. The game was officially released for the first time as part of the Barbie Rewind (2026) compilation.

== Gameplay ==
Barbie and Midge compete in the volleyball minigame.

The game is played using a side-scroller view similar to those found in most platformers. The game is framed as a series of trips Barbie takes across the United States. On most of her trips, she travels with her best friend Midge Hadley, who the second player controls in two-player games.

In Wyoming, Barbie spends her time going on a camping trip. In her California home, she spends her days lounging in her apartment building. In Iowa, she goes to the local county carnival to help find an escaped pig. In Florida, she goes to the beach and plays volleyball and scuba diving. In Texas, Barbie plays with horseshoes. Barbie also has the option while enjoying the sights of Wyoming to ride on three different kinds of horses; each horse provides up to 23 frames of animation.

== Development ==
This game was planned to be part of the Sega Club collection; it is designed for younger female gamers. Paul Tonge composed the music for the Super NES version. According to Software Creations founder Richard Kay, the game cost the company a net loss of £10,000.

In June 2026, Digital Eclipse and Atari announced Barbie Rewind, a compilation of older Barbie video games released the following November. Both the SNES and Genesis versions were included in the collection, marking their first official release.

== Reception ==
Reception

Review scores
Publication	Score
VideoGames & Computer Entertainment	Gen: 6/10
Sega Power	Gen: 11%

Reviewing the Genesis version, GamePro commented that the graphics and sound effects are below average, but that the game is fun and educational for younger gamers.

== See also ==
- List of Barbie video games
