= Cutthroat Island (video game) =

1995 video game

- Super NES cover art
- Developer: Software Creations
- Publisher: Acclaim Entertainment
- Composers: SNES; Chris Jojo (title music); James Hannigan; Martin Goodall; Genesis; Suddi Raval
- Platforms: Game Boy, Game Gear, Genesis, Super NES
- Release: NA: 1995; EU: February 23, 1996
- Genre: Platform
- Modes: Single-player, multiplayer

Cutthroat Island is a platform game based on 1995 film of the same name that was developed by Software Creations and published by Acclaim Entertainment in 1995 for the Game Boy, Game Gear, Genesis, and Super Nintendo Entertainment System. When the game was first released, it featured a promotion by which players could find hidden treasure chests in the game and enter a contest to win real world prizes.

== Gameplay ==
Based on the feature film of the same title, the game casts players in the role of renegade treasure hunters. The player is able to choose between two characters: Morgan Adams, a female character who wields a rapier; or William Shaw, a buccaneer who is armed with a sword. The game features single-player and two-player action modes and features two different gameplay styles to choose from: Swordplay and Brawling.

The player's character must battle through 10 levels, encountering various foes such as pirates, redcoats and harbour masters. In addition to all the swordplay, level two requires players to flee from prison guards in a quarry cart, and level five puts player atop a runaway horse-drawn carriage. As the player progresses through the game several items such as knives, bombs, bottles, torches, hammers, pistols, and other weapons are collectable.

== Plot ==
In 1619, a pirate cutter, the Sea Devil, captured a Spanish cargo ship called Santa Susanna. Before reaching its destination the Sea Devil was caught in a storm and wrecked on the uncharted Cutthroat Island. Only one member of the crew managed to get off of the island alive, Fingers Adams. Before dying he made a map and tore it into three pieces which he gave to his legitimate heirs.

In year 1688, as the pirate Morgan Adams who currently has one piece of the map, the player has begun a quest for the other pieces of the map in hopes of eventually finding the treasure. Already a wanted woman, Morgan will need to fight the law as well as those who hold the pieces of the map.

== Reception ==
GamePro's Sir Garnabus panned the Game Gear version, calling it "A sword fight through monotonous levels with no finale". He criticized the repetitive gameplay, controls, graphics, and glitchy sound effects.

Reviewing the Genesis version, a Next Generation critic opined, "Cutthroat Island doesn't suffer from any one blatant shortcoming, instead it suffers from a lack of anything that sets it apart from an action game three years ago. There's the Final Fight gameplay, the 8-bit NES quality graphics, and finally the obligatory mine-cart level that all together make Cutthroat Island one of the more generic title available." He gave it one out of five stars. Johnny Ballgame of GamePro similarly compared the graphics to the 8-bit Master System, and also lambasted the "button pounding" sword fights, the way the mine cart level doesn't give the player enough time to react to obstacles, the tinny sound, and the music. He concluded the game "has no business in the library of any sane Genesis owner."

GamePro's Grease Monkey gave a more mixed review of the SNES version. While he repeated most of Johnny Ballgame's criticisms, and added that enemies and allies confusingly make the same grunting sound when hit, he found the character artwork and music to at least be decent.

== Legacy ==
In October of 2018, the game's rights were acquired by Canadian production company Liquid Media Group along with other titles originally owned by Acclaim Entertainment.
