= Mike Follin =

British video game programmer

The Revd. Michael Stuart Follin is a former video game programmer, working until the late 1990s. Among other companies, he worked at Software Creations and, while there, worked on ZX Spectrum. The titles included highly rated arcade conversions of Bubble Bobble and Ghouls 'n Ghosts, as well as the innovative The Sentinel, one of the first games on the Spectrum with true 3D graphics. The music for these games was often written by his younger brother Tim Follin.

In CRASH issue 59, Follin cited Knight Lore, Codename MAT and Pentagram as video game classics, with Jonathan Smith as his favorite programmer. Follin's Spectrum conversion of The Sentinel was considered by fellow programmers as one of the top five classic games on that platform.

After sixteen years in the computer games industry, Follin left the industry to train as a priest in the Church of England. He was subsequently ordained at Liverpool Cathedral, and as of 2010 is the vicar at St Peter's, a small Anglican church in Maghull, Merseyside. He married his wife, Lynn Follin, in 1994.
