= Equinox (1993 video game) =

1993 video game

- North American cover art
- Developer: Software Creations
- Publishers: NA/EU: Sony Imagesoft; JP: Epic/Sony Records
- Designer: Ste and John Pickford
- Programmers: Ste and John Pickford
- Artists: Ste and John Pickford; Neal Sutton; Martin Holland
- Composers: Tim Follin; Geoff Follin
- Platform: Super NES
- Release: JP: 12 November 1993; NA: March 1994; EU: 25 March 1994
- Genres: Action adventure, puzzle
- Mode: Single-player

Equinox (Note: Known in Japan as Solstice II (ソルスティスII).) is an action adventure puzzle video game developed by Software Creations and published by Sony Imagesoft for the Super NES. A sequel to Solstice (1990) for the Nintendo Entertainment System, Equinox depicts Glendaal saving his father Shadax, the previous game's playable character, from the imprisonment of Sonia, Shadax's apprentice. The player acts as Glendaal, exploring 458 rooms in eight underground dungeons. The player collects 12 blue orb tokens while solving puzzles, killing enemies, collecting keys, navigating platforms and blocks, and battling bosses. It continues Solstice's isometric puzzle game style, with a greater emphasis on action adventure and the Mode 7 overworld map.

Development of Equinox lasted from 1990 to 1993 and beyond the game's completion, due to difficulty running the graphics on all minor variations of SNES consoles. Brothers Ste and John Pickford were responsible for the programming, design, and visuals, and Solstice composer Tim Follin returned to work on the music with his brother Geoff. The game was released in November 1993 in Japan, in January 1994 in Australia, and in March in North America and Europe. It was critically acclaimed for its graphics, sound, atmosphere, gameplay, potential lifespan, and for the extremely high challenge level of its puzzles. The isometric perspective however, garnered a more mixed response. Some critics found it an intentional puzzle design aspect, and some dismissed it as a technical flaw, while others said the puzzles created from it were cheap.

== Gameplay ==
Glendaal in a Galedonia room attacking ghosts, with two collectable tokens on a pile of wooden log platforms. Equinox has the isometric arcade adventure style of Solstice.

Similar to its predecessor, Solstice (1990), Equinox is an isometric arcade adventure puzzle video game featuring elements of platform and RPG, such as using a menu screen to swap items and weapons. The game has a greater emphasis on action and adventure than its predecessor. The player acts as Glendaal, who traverses through eight dungeons to rescue his father Shadax from the imprisonment of Sonia, Shadax's apprentice. The dungeons traversed are Glendaal's home Galadonia, the forest kingdom south of Galadonia named Tori, a desert with ancient remains east of Galadonia named Deesa, the underwater Athena, the swampy Quagmire, a sea-surrounded kingdom with a large tomb named Afralona, a pirate ship, and Sonia's resting place the Ice Palace of Death Island.

From smoke-puffing huts on the overworld, Glendaal enters the dungeons which contain an increasing number of rooms. The first has 16 rooms, the second 34, third 45, fourth 47, fifth 63, sixth 75, seventh 71, and the last 107. There are 458 rooms in total, much more than Solstice. Many of the rooms are barred by coloured doors that must be unlocked with matching keys, except red herring keys. Apples provide extra lives, and progress can be saved by simply exiting a dungeon.

In a dungeon, Glendaal moves at right angles looking for tokens shaped as blue orbs. Twelve must be collected to summon a boss, all physical manifestations of the spirits guarding the bridges to other lands in the overworld. The bosses include a Bone Head that shoots ghosts; Dung Dung, a chunk of soil which pops out of the ground and shoots boulders; Pincha, a giant crab; Dollop, a blob of slime; Quetzalcoatl, a sentient pole-shaped statue made up of multiple blocks; Eyesis, a spinning pyramid; Billy Bones, a ghost pirate captain who shoots cannonballs; and Sonia, a sorceress shooting plasma projectiles as the final boss of the game. Getting to the tokens requires navigating platforms, moving blocks, dodging spikes, killing enemies, and solving increasingly complex puzzles. The isometric perspective optical illusions form puzzles, based on determining the position of platforms. The rooms all have a single objective, and in some cases rooms must be completed in a specific order.

Glendaal starts with nothing, but obtains tools to attack foes in his quest. Every dungeon contains one magical spell Glendaal can perform, including those for healing, freezing, slowing down and decreasing the energy of enemies, unlocking doors, destroying enemies, and viewing invisible blocks. The magic is powered by collecting potions in the dungeons or by defeating vampire bats in the overworld. Defeating trolls in the overworld will provide extra health points. By defeating the dungeon bosses health and magic will be increased. Glendaal collects weapons, including daggers, swords, axes, twin daggers, swords, scimitars, maces, and twin swords. Killing the bosses of the first five dungeons will provide one of five strings for a harp that can be played in the Overworld to teleport.

Foes in rooms will respawn as long as not all of them are defeated and not all item in that room are collected. Since Glendaal is killed in one hit, learning how to destroy all enemies in rooms is a puzzle. Enemies must be defeated to collect keys, potions, and tokens. Foes include ghosts, spinning devils that can only be harmed while stationary, bouncing blobs with random movement patterns, and plate-armored knights which are vulnerable on their back. Most follow a set pattern, but take several hits.

== Development and release ==
Released in 1990 for the 8-bit Nintendo Entertainment System, Solstice was the first original product of Manchester-based developer Software Creations, after conversions to 8-bit consoles. Programmer and company co-founder Mike Webb conceived Solstice, with the intention of being a Knight Lore-style isometric game for the NES. Published by CSG Imagesoft and in other regions by Nintendo, Solstice was released to a favourable critical reception and became a cult classic for its unique mixture of action, adventure, and RPG elements. Software Creations started the development of a sequel, Equinox in March 1990, four months before Solstice's July release, and finished in mid-1993.

As the first non-Japanese developer to have a Super Nintendo Entertainment System (SNES) development kit, Software Creations began by creating Equinox's engine, which involved analysis of the Super Famicom. The project was produced by Ryoji Akagawa and Allan Becker, and executive produced by Sony's Shigeo Maruyama and Olaf Olafsson. Hiroshi Goto, Jeff Benjamin, Yuji Takahashi, Richard Robinson, and Software Creations founder Richard Kay were chief development executives, and Arthur Bangall was the chief game tester. Programming was initiated by Software Creations founder Mike Webb, and was mostly completed by Ste and John Pickford with contributions from Kevin Edwards and Stephen Ruddy. Whereas Solstice is a single-map puzzle game in which the player can only use magic, the Pickfords and Akagawa intended Equinox to be more of an action game by adding weapons, larger bosses, and RPG elements like discovery through multiple maps. In addition to Webb, Tim Follin, composer for Solstice, returned for Equinox to work on the music and sound, alongside his brother Geoff.

The Pickfords were mainly responsible for the graphics, with additional visuals from Martin Holland and Neal Sutton. The visuals took more than one year to complete and unexpectedly prolonged development. Webb reported in April 1994 that Equinox was completed 18 months prior, but its release was delayed due to technical problems running on minor variations of SNES consoles. Blocks were made as sprites and overlapped to work within available processing power, but the picture processing unit (PPU) was unable to process sprites on the same layer properly, resulting in glitches like the foreground sprites disappearing. To fix the problem, rooms were redesigned, and sprites that disappeared were removed. Another major challenge was the isometric perspective, because 3D shadowing to indicate depth was impossible due to limited processing power. For animation and character design, Glendaal took the longest due to having many movements, and the bosses were done in a week. After the graphics were finished, the final part of development was altering the difficulty of Quagmire by removing a non-player character.

== Reception ==
Reception

Review scores
Publication	Score
Aktueller Software Markt	8/12
Computer and Video Games	88%
Dragon	3/5
Electronic Gaming Monthly	8/10; 8/10; 7/10; 8/10; 7/10
Famitsu	29/40
GameFan	90% 96% 83/100
GamePro	5/5; 5/5; 5/5; 5/5
GameZone	87%
Hyper	83%
Jeuxvideo.com	17/20
Mega Fun	79%
Nintendo Power	4/5; 3.1/5; 3.7/5; 3.6/5
Official Nintendo Magazine	87/100
Player One	93%
Superjuegos	93%
Super Game Power	4/5; 4.1/5; 5/5; 5/5
Super Play	90%
Total!	91%
Video Games (DE)	74%
Electronic Games	92%
Game Power	18/20
Games World	87%
NMS (AU)	88/100
SNES Force	84%
Super Action	91%
Super Console	87/100
Super Control	85%
Super Gamer	89%

Awards
Publication	Award
VideoGames	Best Strategy Game, Best Cartridge Music (runner-up), Best Gameplay (runner-up)
Electronic Games	Best Adventure/RPG Video Game (nominee)

Equinox garnered critical acclaim upon release. GamePro gave four perfect 5/5 scores for graphics, sound, control and fun factor, describing it as the combination of the best tropes of several genres into one original game. VideoGames magazine awarded Equinox the Best Strategy Game of 1994, and nominated it Best Cartridge Music and Best Gameplay. Equinox was nominated Best Adventure/RPG Video Game by Electronic Games and awarded Best Ad of 1994 by Electronic Gaming Monthly. In 1995, Total! ranked it 97th on its list of the "Top 100 SNES Games".

Reviewers exclaimed Equinox stood out in the SNES library of mostly platformers and shoot-em-ups. In addition to a slower pace, atmosphere, and requiring a mixture of critical thinking and quick wits, the biggest reason was its 3D isometric perspective. Critics in the European specialist press, mostly the UK, were reminded of 1980s computer games where the isometric puzzle game genre was the most prominent, such as Knight Lore (1984), Alien 8 (1985), Head over Heels (1987), and Batman (1986). The isometric view also led to comparisons to another adventure RPG, Landstalker (1992), released around the same time on the Sega Mega Drive. The isometric perspective results in artifacts in terms of distances between sprites. Some critics viewed this as optical illusions intended to test the player, but others criticized it as a technical flaw. Detractors wrote the issue was especially noticeable with the collision detection of enemies, joking that the foes were surrounded by a big invisible forcefield of death.

Game World's Adrian exclaimed Equinox "has the most beautiful backdrops and sprites that have been produced for ages", and Butcher stated it was some of the greatest for the SNES. The visuals were praised for their character sprites, colours, detail, and sense of hugeness in the environments. A frequent positive was the game's Mode 7 map and overworld sections, especially the "smooth" and "breathtaking" rotation feature. Keith of Super Gamer and Frank of Super Action, however, argued it was to hard to map where Glendaal was on the overworld, attributed to the removal of an auto-map that was in the predecessor.

Reviewers called the soundtrack the SNES library's best, "most engaging", and "atmospheric". Brookes praised the sound effects as "amazingly realistic", citing Glendaal's pushing of a block. Hyper's Andrew Humphreys noted the soundtrack's "ethereal" and "otherworldly" tone, comparing its new age style to the score of Ecco the Dolphin (1992). He claimed it was unique from other RPG games which "bombard you with a monotonous Medieval theme that loops over and over again". The graphics and sound were complimented for making the game atmospheric and suspenseful, and some critics admitted to being spooked by the music and sound effects and recommended to play the game in stereo.

Critics reported being heavily absorbed, involved, and addicted to Equinox. The motivation to keep exploring all parts of the game's world was attributed to the graphics, music, huge spaces, high amount of rooms, and the design, such as the puzzles and mysterious placement of objects. The puzzles were frequently described as very difficult. Journalists such as Bud D. of GameFan and Sandy Petersen of Dragon confessed to being stuck for hours on some puzzles, and a Player One writer reported that he played the last dungeons as long as the prior seven combined.
