= Starsky & Hutch (video game) =

2003 video game

- European PS2 cover art
- Developers: Mind's Eye Productions (Windows/PS2); Supersonic Software (GCN/Xbox); Spellbound (GBA)
- Publisher: Empire Interactive: NA: Gotham Games (Windows/PS2/Xbox)
- Composer: Tim Follin
- Engine: RenderWare
- Platforms: Windows, PlayStation 2, Xbox, Game Boy Advance, GameCube
- Release: Windows, PlayStation 2, Xbox: EU: 20 June 2003; NA: 9 September 2003; Game Boy Advance: EU: 26 September 2003; NA: 2004; GameCube: EU: 26 September 2003; NA: 31 August 2004
- Genre: Vehicular combat
- Modes: Single-player, multiplayer

Starsky & Hutch is a 2003 vehicular combat video game by British studio Mind's Eye Productions and published by Empire Interactive based on the television series of the same name created by William Blinn. The game was released for Microsoft Windows, PlayStation 2, Xbox, Game Boy Advance and GameCube.

== Plot and gameplay ==
The game follows the adventures of David Michael Starsky and Kenneth 'Hutch' Hutchinson as they clean up Bay City in their Gran Torino.

The game features asymmetric multiplayer gameplay, in which one player controls Starsky as he drives the car whilst another controls Hutch as he shoots enemies and obstacles. These can be performed with various steering wheel and light gun peripherals, such as the GunCon. In single player, players can drive as Starsky with shooting either set to free or auto aim.

The game consists of three 'seasons' consisting of several 'episodes'. In each episode, players need to complete objectives, such as chasing down criminals or escorting other vehicles, whilst also keeping Viewer Ratings high. Throughout the game there are various icons the player can either shoot or drive through, offering bonuses such as increased grip, higher viewer ratings and more powerful weapons, as well as special events such as jumping off ramps.

The game has a 70s style presentation and features the original voice of Huggy Bear, Antonio Fargas as the games narrator.

== Development and release ==
The game was first announced to be in development by Empire Interactive on 24 April 2001, as a title for the PlayStation 2 and PC. In July, it was announced that Vivendi Universal Interactive Publishing would distribute and publish fifteen of their titles in North America, including Starsky & Hutch.

An Xbox version was later announced for release, and on 16 July 2002, Empire announced a GameCube port and Game Boy Advance version would also be released although it was unsure if they would be released in the United States,

Vivendi Universal soon dropped out of the publishing and distribution deal, and during E3 2003, Empire announced that Take-Two Interactive subsidiary Gotham Games would publish the title in North America except on Nintendo systems, where no publisher was confirmed, or if those versions would be released in North America.

On 9 March 2004, The GameCube and Game Boy Advance versions finally saw North American releases when BAM! Entertainment announced they would distribute the two versions for Empire. The company soon announced that the GCN version would be released on August 31, 2004, two weeks prior to the date.

== Reception ==
Reception

Aggregate score
Aggregator	Score				
Aggregator	GBA	GameCube	PC	PS2	Xbox
Metacritic	49/100	59/100	56/100	60/100	58/100

Review scores
Publication	Score				
Publication	GBA	GameCube	PC	PS2	Xbox
Edge	N/A	N/A	7/10	7/10	7/10
Electronic Gaming Monthly	N/A	N/A	N/A	4.83/10	4.83/10
Eurogamer	N/A	N/A	N/A	6/10	N/A
Game Informer	N/A	N/A	N/A	5.75/10	5.75/10
GamePro	N/A	N/A	N/A	N/A	3/5
GameRevolution	N/A	N/A	N/A	C	N/A
GameSpot	N/A	6.4/10	6.8/10	6.8/10	6.8/10
GameSpy	N/A	N/A	N/A	3/5	3/5
GameZone	N/A	5.7/10	7/10	N/A	6.3/10
IGN	N/A	5.5/10	5.5/10	5.5/10	5.4/10
Nintendo Power	2.4/5	2.9/5	N/A	N/A	N/A
Official U.S. PlayStation Magazine	N/A	N/A	N/A	2/5	N/A
Official Xbox Magazine (US)	N/A	N/A	N/A	N/A	7.6/10
PC Gamer (US)	N/A	N/A	67%	N/A	N/A
Entertainment Weekly	N/A	N/A	N/A	B	B
Playboy	N/A	N/A	N/A	75%	75%

Starsky & Hutch received "mixed" reviews on all platforms except the Game Boy Advance version, which received "generally unfavorable reviews", according to video game review aggregator Metacritic.
