= The Sentinel (video game) =

- Cover art by David John Rowe
- Publisher: Firebird
- Designer: Geoff Crammond
- Programmers: BBC Micro, C64; Geoff Crammond; ZX Spectrum; Mike Follin; Atari ST, Amiga; Steve Bak; MS-DOS; Mark Roll
- Platforms: BBC Micro, Commodore 64, Amstrad CPC, ZX Spectrum, Atari ST, Amiga, MS-DOS
- Release: 1986, 1987
- Genre: Puzzle
- Mode: Single-player

The Sentinel, released in the United States as The Sentry, is a puzzle video game created by Geoff Crammond, published by Firebird in 1986 for the BBC Micro. It was converted to the Commodore 64 (by Crammond himself), Amstrad CPC (with a cross-compiler written by Crammond), ZX Spectrum (by Mike Follin), Atari ST, Amiga (both by Steve Bak), and IBM PC compatibles (by Mark Roll). The Sentinel was among the first games to use solid-filled 3D graphics on home computers. It won numerous awards upon release and has since appeared on several "best video games of all time" lists.

The IBM PC port supports VGA graphics, with an additional lighting effect: objects and terrain become darker the further away they are from the point of view. The Amiga port has a sampled soundtrack by David Whittaker.

== Gameplay ==
Atari ST screenshot

In The Sentinel, the player takes the role of a Synthoid (called just "robot" in the US version), a telepathic robot who has to take control of a number of surreal, checkered landscapes of hills and valleys, by climbing from the lowest spot, where the hunt begins, to the highest platform, over which the Sentinel looms.

The Synthoid itself cannot move across the level; instead it can look around, accumulate energy by absorbing the objects that are scattered across the landscape, create stacks of boulders, generate inert Synthoid shells and transfer its consciousness from one of these clones to another.

List of executable actions:

- Looking around by moving the pointer on the screen
- Toggle cursor on/off, turning faster with it off
- Absorbing an object to gain its energy
- Creating trees in empty squares
- Creating one or more boulders in empty squares
- Absorbing one or more boulders
- Creating a new Synthoid shell in an empty square or on a boulder
- Transferring consciousness to another Synthoid
- Hyperspace to a random part of the level of equal and lower height at the expense of 3 units of energy

Controlling Synthoids that are standing at a higher level is fundamental to the game, because only the objects which occupy a visible square can be interacted with (the player may absorb or create objects on a boulder if the sides can be seen). While doing so, the player must watch for the rotation of the Sentinel and be careful not to stand in an area which the Sentinel can see, or else it will start absorbing energy from the Synthoid, and when the energy is gone, the game is over.

Height is gained by placing a boulder on any visible square, and putting a Synthoid on the boulder. The player may then transfer consciousness to the new Synthoid, and absorb the old one. Stacks of boulders of any height may be created, if the player has enough energy. In order to absorb the Sentinel, the player must create a stack of boulders of sufficient height that the Synthoid on top can look down on the Sentinel's platform. When the Sentinel has been absorbed, the player may no longer absorb any energy from the landscape, although objects may be created as normal.

In later levels, the Sentinel is assisted by a number of Sentries. They behave exactly like the Sentinel, but absorbing them is not necessary to complete the level. Unlike the Sentinel, the Sentries do not stand on a platform, but on ordinary squares. If the Sentinel or Sentry cannot see the square the Synthoid is standing on, but its head is visible and there are trees in the vicinity, it may transform one of them into a Meanie, that will force the Synthoid to hyperspace and lose 3 units of energy. If the Meanie cannot see the player's square after a full rotation, it will turn back into a tree and the Sentinel or Sentry will resume rotation.

The rotation of the Sentinel and the Sentries is slow and predictable. However, if there are many Sentries, there will be few safe locations anywhere on the landscape. If either the Sentinel or the Sentries come across a source of energy (boulders or a synthoid), their rotation stops while they absorb the energy, one unit at a time. To keep the total energy constant, a tree is created randomly on the landscape for each absorbed unit of energy.

A level is won by absorbing the Sentinel off its platform, creating a new Synthoid in the place of the Sentinel, transferring the consciousness to it and hyperspacing to a new level. Progress is saved via a password system.

The more energy the player has accumulated before jumping into hyperspace, the more levels will be skipped. Sometimes (depending on the individual skill of the player), it is necessary to replay a level in order to beat it with less energy than the last time, since the difficulty is not incremental.

== Development ==
The Sentinel has no ending sequence; upon completion of the last level, the player is looped back to level 1. When questioned about this, Crammond said he never thought anyone would go so far as to finish the game.

== Reception ==
Reception

Award
Publication	Award
Crash	Smash

Computer Gaming World called the Commodore 64 version of The Sentinel "outstanding and addictive ... I highly recommend it for many absorbing hours". It received a Gold Medal award by Zzap!64 magazine, describing it as an exceptional piece of software in a class of its own, and refusing to give it a numbered rating as a result.

The ZX Spectrum version received a CRASH Smash award, the magazine praising its originality, atmosphere and tension. It was also placed at number 7 in the Your Sinclair official top 100. It was also voted Best Original Game of the Year at the Golden Joystick Awards.

The Amiga version was ranked the 20th best game of all time by Amiga Power; one of the 50 best computer games ever by PC Format, who called it "straight out of left field" and "inspired"; and the 53rd best game of all time by Next Generation, who cited the "Absolute, paranoid, scrambling tension" experienced by the players as they try to avoid the sentinel's gaze.

== Legacy ==
A preview of a nonexistent sequel called Monolith appeared in 1995 in Italian magazine The Games Machine as an April Fool's Day prank. In 1998, the real sequel called Sentinel Returns was released for Windows and PlayStation. In December 2020, a freeware game named Monolith, based on that hoax, actually came out and was reviewed in issue 1/86 of Zzap! published by the Airons association in Vigevano.

A number of unofficial remakes and variants of The Sentinel have been written, such as Sentry (1998, Windows freeware), Zenith (2005, Windows freeware), Augmentinel (2019, Windows freeware) and Pinnacle (2023, Linux, Mac and Windows freeware).

Annwn: The Otherworld (2019) has similar gameplay with a Celtic motif and several changes to user interface and level structure.
