= Solstice (1990 video game) =

1990 video game

- North American box art by Mike Winterbauer
- Developer: Software Creations
- Publishers: NA: CSG Imagesoft; JP: Epic/Sony Records; EU: Nintendo
- Director: Richard Kay
- Designers: Mike Webb; Mark Wilson
- Programmer: Mike Webb
- Artist: Mark Wilson
- Composer: Tim Follin
- Platform: Nintendo Entertainment System
- Release: NA: July 1990; JP: July 20, 1990; EU: July 1991
- Genre: Puzzle
- Mode: Single-player

Solstice: The Quest for the Staff of Demnos, or simply Solstice, is a 1990 puzzle video game developed by Software Creations. It was published by CSG Imagesoft in North America and Nintendo in Europe, for the Nintendo Entertainment System. The game focuses on the wizard Shadax's bid to defeat the evil baron Morbius and rescue Princess Eleanor, whom Morbius plans to sacrifice. Shadax aims to gather the six pieces of the titular Staff of Demnos hidden within the fortress of Kâstleröck. The setting is non-linear, and consists of 250 rooms, each with a particular puzzle to solve.

Solstice is the first original game to be developed by Software Creations, which had previously only worked on converted titles between 8-bit consoles. The game features a musical score by Tim Follin, who has named the title track as his favourite among his compositions. Solstice was received positively by critics for its puzzles and graphics, and the audio was also praised. A sequel, titled Equinox, was released for the Super NES in 1993.

== Gameplay ==
An example of gameplay in Solstice. One of the many hazards is the large translucent tiles pictured here, which vanish quickly after being jumped on and risk sending the player character Shadax plummeting to the floor of spikes below.

Solstice is an isometric-perspective puzzle game in which the player controls the wizard Shadax, who must navigate 250 rooms within the fortress Kâstleröck and assemble the six pieces of the Staff of Demnos to defeat the baron Morbius and rescue the princess Eleanor. Shadax's basic abilities consist of jumping, and picking up and dropping objects. Early in the game, Shadax can obtain a pair of magic elfin boots that augment his jumping height. He is additionally equipped with a few beakers that can be used to store four different varieties of potions. These potions can either grant temporary invincibility, destroy all moving objects in a room, freeze time, or make invisible objects visible. At the beginning of the game, the beakers hold two doses of a potion each, though refills can be obtained later on. Any number of potions can be cast simultaneously in a given room, but the spell(s) will only last as long as Shadax remains within that room. Any effects from the potion(s) will disappear when the player departs from the room.

Many of the fortress's rooms feature hazards such as floors covered in spikes, conveyor belts, vanishing bridges and tiles, and floating mines, and may also be inhabited by antagonistic creatures like trolls, giant spiders and demons. The rooms often include movable blocks that can be found either lying on the floor or falling from above. These blocks can be used to move safely around the rooms and bypass enemies and hazards. Falling blocks can be frozen in mid-air with the time-freezing potion and be used as steps. There are also hovering crystal balls that can be pushed through the air and ridden as transportation, but cannot be picked up and carried. In some rooms, bombs can be detonated to create an entrance to a previously blocked-off passageway, though the detonators are hidden within nearby rooms. Other rooms contain portals that provide the only access to certain rooms within the fortress. Some rooms can only be cleared or accessed after finding and using one of four hidden magic keys.

Extra lives can be obtained by collecting blue pointed hats scattered throughout the fortress. Although the screen only registers ten lives at one time, the player can continue to accumulate more lives from that point. The player can also collect coins that allow them to return to a certain room when all lives are lost instead of having to restart the game from the beginning. At any point in the game, the player can access a map which chronicles every room that they have entered and indicates all possible exits. Some of these exits appear on the map, but will not appear in-game until a certain task is performed. Aside from the map, the player can view an inventory listing a percentage of the total number of rooms they have visited, as well as the total number of magic items they have found.

== Plot ==
On the eve of the winter solstice, Morbius the Malevolent kidnaps Eleanor, Princess of Arcadia, to sacrifice her ritually and become the Evil Baron of Darkness. Shadax the wizard, after witnessing the kidnapping, heads to Morbius' stronghold, the fortress Kâstleröck, to rescue Eleanor. Once while researching Kâstleröck in the Library of Arcadia to find a way to overthrow Morbius, Shadax learned of a secret entrance into Kâstleröck and the whereabouts of the Staff of Demnos, an ancient weapon with the power to defeat Morbius. The staff was hidden in Kâstleröck because that was where Morbius would least expect to find it. Morbius' spies searched for the Staff, but did not find it because it was broken into six pieces and made invisible. However, every one hundred years on the winter solstice, all six pieces become visible. Knowing a way in, Shadax enters Kâstleröck to reassemble the Staff of Demnos, overthrow Morbius' forces of darkness, and save Princess Eleanor. Upon restoring the Staff of Demnos, Shadax seeks out and frees Eleanor from imprisonment and destroys Morbius with the Staff.

== Development and release ==
=== Conception and design ===
The development of Solstice was initiated by the programmer Mike Webb of Software Creations, who desired to create a Knight Lore-style isometric title for the NES. Solstice is the first original game to be developed within the company, which had previously only developed converted titles between 8-bit consoles. Mark Wilson, having previously worked as a programmer and a graphics artist for the company, saw Webb's proposal as an opportunity to attempt the role of a video game designer.

In spite of his personal dislike of isometric games up to that point, Wilson thought it was sensible to create an isometric title as the company's first original work, as no such format had previously been attempted on the NES. Over the course of four weeks, Wilson designed the entire game as sketches and notes on paper, often within a McDonald's on Oxford Road. All of the game's item positions and events were placed on a "master map" hand-drawn on a very large sheet of graph paper, and were based on Wilson's understanding of what the player might think or need at any particular point. This detailed approach put Wilson at odds with Webb, who failed to see why such an amount of time would be taken to design a game as opposed to expediently inserting rooms into a map at random. At one point, Webb presented Wilson with an alternate map created by his girlfriend the previous night, which consisted of 255 randomly-connected empty rooms. Out of guilt for their furious arguments and pleasure with the final product, Wilson would ultimately give Webb a co-designer credit in the game's attract mode screens. Wilson would later regret this action. During a subsequent interview with Wilson at MicroProse, one of the interviewers falsely identified Webb as the game's sole designer.

=== Visuals and audio ===
During the game's early stages of development, the player character Shadax appeared as an undistinguished purple rectangle; the Shadax sprite was eventually designed by Wilson. In creating the game's setting and aesthetic, Wilson acknowledged the slim capacity for storytelling on Nintendo's cheapest available cartridge, and thus focused on the atmosphere, which he says "traded on the simplest and most basic of fantasy ideas". On stylistic influences, Wilson cited "all of the usual suspects [...] from The Lord of the Rings to Excalibur".

A sample of the opening theme of Solstice, composed by Tim Follin.

The game's music was composed by Tim Follin. The primary background music was made to be atmospheric and dark, while the opening theme was made to be powerful. On his approach to the score, Follin commented that the "folk" melody style he had previously used for Ghouls 'n Ghosts was particularly suited for Solstice due to the game's fantasy-oriented title and setting. The title theme's changing moods and phases were an attempt by Follin to keep the track interesting; Follin felt that the constant evolution required to keep music generally interesting was imperative in video game music due to its lack of vocals and performance at the time. During development, a colleague of Follin played for him several works of game composer Rob Hubbard, which convinced Follin that the technical boundaries of the contemporary generation of hardware have been reached, and refocused his attention from the score's technique to the composition. While Follin retrospectively identified the title theme to be his favourite among his own compositions, he felt that his work on the in-game music could have been improved to be "a lot more spacious and interesting", as it "looped too short and became irritating quite quickly".

=== Publishing and release ===
The game's development spanned the course of 20 months. While Solstice was given an early demonstration to Nintendo, Software Creations owner Richard Kay grew impatient and quickly sold the game's North American publishing rights to CSG Imagesoft. After a response from Nintendo stating their desire to publish the title, Nintendo was given the publishing rights for all other regions, and the resulting contract with Nintendo would lead to other high-profile NES and SNES games. Upon receiving the game's publishing rights, CSG demanded that Shadax be changed from a wizard to a bodybuilder in a loincloth. When Wilson refused to make the change, CSG then requested that Shadax's beard in the cutscenes be shortened, and the alteration was implemented against Wilson's protest.

The cover art and encased poster were created by Mike Winterbauer, who credited the job with getting him more high-profile work. Upon observing Shadax's small appearance in the game, Winterbauer decided to create an impressive and muscular wizard for the cover art. He considered posing for the painting himself, but decided that a bodybuilder would be a more suitable model, and called upon one he had met while grocery shopping in Pasadena. The poster depicts a cutaway view of the castle with different levels and creatures in several rooms. To Winterbauer's disappointment, a princess perched in the castle's tower was covered by the Solstice logo in the final printed poster. The cover art was lambasted by Wilson as having nothing to do with the game that was written. He deemed it inferior to a proposed cover created by Neal Sutton that had already been supplied to CSG. He also derided the instruction booklet written by CSG as "a mass of illiterate and asinine drivel".

Wilson spent the game's development time attempting to obtain a contract from Software Creations covering his work on Solstice, only to be given verbal promises about the percentage of the profits he would receive. Following the game's completion, these promises were casually broken, and Wilson would not receive any monetary gain from the title's sales. Wilson left Software Creations following this development, and struggled to obtain work for the next two years.

Solstice was announced in April 1990, and was released that July in North America, and then a full year later in Europe. It was also published by Epic/Sony Records in Japan on July 20 of the same year under the subtitle Sanjigen Meikyū no Kyō Jū. CSG's advertisement campaign for Solstice in North America consisted of a photograph of what Wilson described as "an oiled-up bodybuilder with long hair wearing dayglo pink posing trunks", which he called "embarrassingly bad". The first 5,000 customers to order Solstice from CSG Imagesoft received a free "Player's Pak", consisting of an 8 mm video tape on the making of Solstice, a player's score card, trading cards and coloured stickers. Solstice was featured in the 1990 Nintendo World Championships, with the first press coverage in March by The Dallas Morning News as part of the Championships.

== Reception ==
Reception

Review scores
Publication	Score
Computer and Video Games	93/100
Electronic Gaming Monthly	7/10, 8/10, 7/10, 8/10
Famitsu	26/40
Nintendo Power	3.75/5 (Note: Nintendo Power rated Solstice 4.6/5 for graphics/sound, 2.7/5 for play control, 3.7/5 for challenge, and 4/5 for theme/fun.)
Raze	71/100
Total!	90%
Mean Machines	85%

Solstice was met with a positive critical reception upon release. Richard Leadbetter of Computer and Video Games described the gameplay as "excellent, with some brain-bending puzzles and nice power-ups for Shadax's abilities". Paul Glancey, also of Computer and Video Games, described Solstice as "a BIG game with an awful lot of secrets to discover", and compared the puzzles to those of Knight Lore. Julian Rignall of Mean Machines also made a positive comparison to Knight Lore and noted that some of the puzzles were "very devious". Matt Regan, also of Mean Machines, stated that while Solstice is a challenging game which "puzzle fans should find interesting", "the excitement fades" as "shifting blocks to stand on or to prevent the attacks of a nasty becomes boring".

While Marc Camron and Ed Semrad of Electronic Gaming Monthly respectively considered the game to be "unique" and "a refreshing change of pace from all of the me-too type puzzle games", the publication's four reviewers collectively found the controls difficult and awkward. Robin Wyles of Raze compared the visuals and gameplay to those of Cadaver, and saw Solstice as "an admirable attempt to relive the Knight Lore days" that was "quite refreshing" in the face of the NES's lack of isometric-perspective titles. However, he argued the quantity of puzzles negatively impacted their variety, and felt that the puzzles were "a bit too easy to solve, which reduces its long-term appeal". Leadbetter described the graphics as "excellent throughout, with some of the best backdrops and sprites ever seen in this type of game", and Glancey also felt that the graphics were "really lovely". Rignall, Regan and Semrad described the graphics as "great", and Steve Harris and Ken "Sushi-X" Williams of EGM said the game was "beautiful". While Wyles appreciated the game's isometric perspective, he saw the colour schemes as "unimaginative".

The game's score was singled out for praise. Leadbetter proclaimed that "the renowned Tim Follin comes up trumps yet again with some brilliant atmospheric scores", and both he and Glancey, along with Rignall, considered the soundtrack to be some of the best they had heard on the NES. Regan described the game's soundtrack as "moody and atmospheric", and Semrad called the music "fantastic". Wyles, however, described the sound effects as "ropey" and the in-game background music as "mediocre". The title theme in particular became one of Follin's best-known tracks in retrospect. Brett Elston of GamesRadar+ proclaimed that "if any 8-bit song could take you on a journey, this is it. From its modest, almost hobbit-like opening to its soaring jig halfway through, the title screen music tramples over all other NES music". He additionally described the primary background track as "considerably more mellow but no less proficient and listenable", and preferred its presence as in-game music "because there's no way I could play ANYTHING with that title screen going nuts". Nate Andrews of Nintendo World Report said that "the regality of the opening track provides a fantastic build up for the ensuing blast, which nearly forces you to take a knee under its spectacle before dropping into extended, kicking jig, then moving into the rest of the prog-y soundtrack". Layton Shumway of VentureBeat remarked that the theme "sounds like a lost track from a Yes album" and it "psyches you out with its single-note fanfare intro, instantly kicks into high gear with cascading synth lines, then settles into a propulsive 6/8 rock beat".

== Legacy ==
A sequel to Solstice, titled Equinox, was announced in January 1992, initially for a summer release that year, and was released for the Super NES in November 1993. The plot centers on Shadax's son Glendaal, who must rescue Shadax from his treacherous apprentice Sonia. The game consists of 450 rooms split between eight dungeons, and also features an isometric perspective, but includes a rotatable camera that incorporates Mode 7 effects. Tim Follin reprised his role as composer and was joined in this duty by his brother Geoff. Equinox was released to generally positive critical reception. Hiroshi Minagawa enjoyed Solstice and its quarter-view perspective served as inspiration for a prototype design he showcased to Yasumi Matsuno, which formed the technical foundation for Tactics Ogre: Let Us Cling Together.
