= Sony Music Entertainment Japan =

Japanese entertainment conglomerate

Sony Music Entertainment (Japan) Inc.
- Logo used since 2001

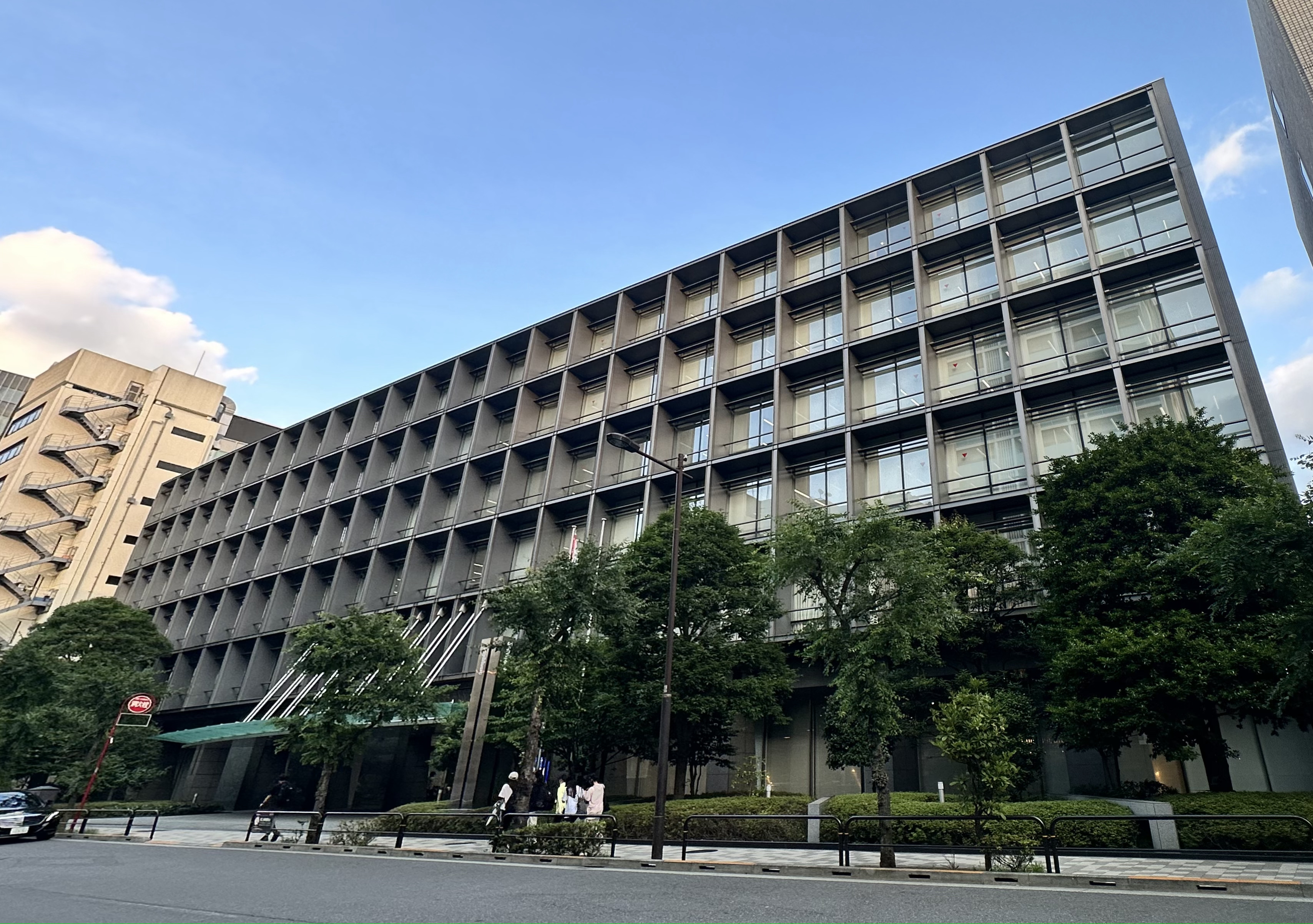
- Headquarters of SMEJ in Rokubanchō, Chiyoda, Tokyo
- Native name: 株式会社ソニー・ミュージックエンタテインメント
- Romanized name: Kabushiki gaisha Sonī Myūjikku Entateinmento
- Formerly: CBS/Sony Records Inc. (1968–1983); CBS/Sony Group, Inc. (1983–1991)
- Type: Subsidiary
- Industry: Entertainment
- Founded: 11 March 1968; 58 years ago
- Headquarters: 4–5 Rokubanchō, Chiyoda, Tokyo, Japan
- Area served: Japan
- Key people: Atsuhiro Iwakami (president and CEO)
- Products: Music; Anime; Motion pictures Video games Video production
- Revenue: ▲¥531,4 billion (FY25)
- Number of employees: 5.000
- Parent: CBS Records Group (1968–1988); Sony Group Corporation
- Subsidiaries: See § Subsidiaries
- Website: sme.co.jp; sonymusic.co.jp

Sony Music Entertainment (Japan) Inc. (SMEJ), also known as Sony Music Japan, is a Japanese entertainment company wholly owned by Sony Group Corporation. SMEJ's extensive operations encompass record labels, music publishing, anime production, and event organization. Founded in 1968 as CBS/Sony, the company operates independently from the United States–based Sony Music Entertainment due to its diversity and strength in the Japanese market. Its prominent subsidiaries include Sony Music Labels, which manages and operates its various record labels; Sony Music Solutions, which provides comprehensive support services like physical distribution, merchandise sales, and event planning; and the animation production company, Aniplex.

The company holds a dominant position in the Anime song market, with its artists providing songs for several series per year. Sony Music Japan has long utilized anime productions as a major platform for its artists, particularly through its subsidiary Aniplex. The establishment of the Sacra Music label in 2017 further cemented this focus, dedicated specifically to managing artists prominent in the anisong genre, such as LiSA and Aimer. This strategy leverages the global popularity of anime titles to propel Japanese artists to international audiences.

Sony Music does not hold the trademark rights to the Columbia name in Japan; therefore, releases from Columbia Records (outside of Japan) are issued under the Sony Records label in Japan, though it retains the usage of the "walking eye" logo. The rights to the Columbia name and trademark are instead controlled by Nippon Columbia, which served as the licensee for the American Columbia Records until 1968.

With Sony Corporation of America's buyout of Bertelsmann's stake in Sony BMG, Sony Music Entertainment Japan stepped in to acquire outstanding shares of BMG Japan from Sony BMG, making it a wholly owned subsidiary of Sony Music Japan.

== History ==
=== Beginnings as CBS joint venture ===
The idea for a CBS/Sony joint venture came in 1967 from Harvey Schein, then President of Columbia Records International, who had spent a decade traveling the world building CBS's international company. In 1972, Schein would leave CBS to become the president of Sony Corporation of America.

Sony Music Entertainment Japan was officially incorporated in March 1968 as a Tokyo-based 50/50 joint venture between Sony and U.S. conglomerate CBS to distribute the latter's music releases in Japan. The company was incorporated as CBS/Sony Records and with Sony co-founder Akio Morita as president.

Norio Ohga, who himself was a musician, was part of the management team from the formation of the company and served as president and representative director since April 1970. In 1972, when CBS/Sony was generating robust profits, Ohga was named chairman and, at the same time, gained further responsibility and influence within Sony. He would continue to work for the music company one morning a week. In 1980, Toshio Ozawa succeeded Ohga as president.

In 1983, the company was renamed CBS/Sony Group.

=== Sony acquires The CBS Records Group in 1988 ===
In January 1988, after more than a year of negotiations, Sony acquired the CBS Records Group and the 50% of CBS/Sony Group that it did not already own.

In March 1988, four wholly owned subsidiaries were folded into CBS/Sony Group: CBS/Sony Inc., Epic/Sony Records Inc., CBS/Sony Records Inc. and Sony Video Software International. The company was renamed Sony Music Entertainment (Japan), Inc.

On November 22, 1991, Sony Music began trading on the Tokyo Stock Exchange, initially offered at its 6,800 yen per share subscription price, but fell to 5,700 yen due to no buyers.

Shugo Matsuo was named new president in January 1992, replacing Toshio Ozawa, who was appointed to the post of chairman. Overall sales for the fiscal year ending March 31, 1991, were 83.8 billion yen with a pretax profit of 9.2 billion yen. In June 1996, Ryokichi Kunugi became the new president. Shugo Matsuo was named chairman. Shigeo Maruyama was appointed to the new post of CEO on October 1, 1997, and replaced Kunugi as president in February 1998.

In August 1998, the logo was changed from the original "Walking Eye" to the current one.

As of 2019, Mizuno Michinori is the official CEO of the company. In May 2018, SMEJ, through its Sony Creative Products division, acquired a 39% stake in the Peanuts comic strip franchise from DHX Media.

=== Video games ===
The company entered the video game industry in 1986 when CBS/Sony Records started making games for the Famicom with Seikima II Akuma no Gyakushū!, and it was followed it in 1987 with the Epic/Sony Records label delivering Famicom games. This is not Sony's first entry into the video game industry, the company previously published games for MSX under the Hit Bit line.

The company expanded in Western publishing in late 1988 when the group founded CSG Imagesoft to localize its titles for the North American market. The company was renamed to Sony Imagesoft in 1991, nearly two years after Sony acquired Columbia Pictures, with the Imagesoft division moving to the new Sony Electronic Publishing subsidiary.

During this time, producers seeking out creative talent and nurturing them to help develop new games, a strategy that was later used by Sony Computer Entertainment during its early years. The company churned out hits like Hook and Skyblazer for the SNES. The company also brought Western-developed titles like Solstice to the Japanese market, and the success led a sequel Equinox, which was commissioned by SMEJ for a Western market release by Sony Imagesoft. In 1993, the company released The Seven Colors: Legend of PSY・S City, which marked the debut of video game designer Masaya Matsuura, who go on to develop PaRappa the Rapper.

The company formed Sony Computer Entertainment in 1993, forcing SME Japan to stop publishing Nintendo games under the Epic/Sony Records name, and started publish video games with the SME Japan name. SME Japan however makes games autonomously from SCEI, like Psygnosis later did for SCEE and 989 Studios for SCEA. In 1998, the company signed a deal with Activision to publish games for Western territories, previously its games were localized by Sony Imagesoft, then SCEA/SCEE. In 2000, most of the functions were in the progress of transferring of SCEI, finally phasing it out in 2004 following the release of wordimagesoundplay for PlayStation 2. Also in 2000, the Tenchu IP was sold to Activision.

==== List of games published and/or licensed ====
Year	Title	Developer	Platform	Notes
as CBS/Sony Group
1986	Seikima II Akuma no Gyakushū!	ISCO	Famicom	
1987	Seikima II Special	ISCO	MSX	published by Sony Corporation
1988	Paris-Dakar Rally Special!	ISCO	Famicom	
1989	Kyuukyoku Tiger	Micronics	Famicom	published in North America by American Sammy as Twin Cobra
1989	Captain Ed	Graphic Research	Famicom	
1989	Famicom Doubutsu Seitai Zukan! Katte ni Shirokuma: Mori o Sukue no Maki!	Graphic Research	Famicom	
1989	TM Network: Live in Power Bowl	CBS/Sony Group	Famicom	
1989	Tashiro Masashi no Princess ga Ippai	Soft VIsion	MSX	published by HAL Laboratory
1989	Pachipro Densetsu	Coconuts Japan	MSX	published by HAL Laboratory
as Epic/Sony Records
1987	Tokoro-san no Mamoru mo Semeru mo	HAL Laboratory	Famicom	
1988	Vegas Dream	HAL Laboratory	Famicom	published by HAL America in North America
1989	Flying Hero	Aicom	Famicom	
1989	Tashiro Masashi no Princess ga Ippai	TOSE	Famicom	
1990	Soccer Boy	Kitty Group	Game Boy	known as Soccer Mania in North America
1990	Solstice: The Quest for the Staff of Demnos	Software Creations	Famicom	Japanese release
1991	RoboCop	Ocean Software	Game Boy	Japanese release
1991	Hakunetsu Pro Yakyuu Ganba League	Sting	Super Famicom	known as Extra Innings in North America
1991	Drakkhen	Bandit Inc.	PC-98	Japanese adaptation
1991	Drakkhen	Bandit Inc.	Sharp X68000	Japanese adaptation
1991	Jerry Boy	Game Freak	Super Famicom	known as Smart Ball in North America
1991	Dragon's Lair	Motivetime	Famicom	Japanese release
1991	Dragon's Lair: The Legend	Motivetime	Game Boy	Japanese release
1991	Altered Space	Software Creations	Game Boy	Japanese release
1991	Xenon 2: Megablast	System Sacom	PC-98	Japanese adaptation
1991	Xenon 2: Megablast	System Sacom	Sharp X68000	Japanese adaptation
1991	Hudson Hawk	Special FX Software	Famicom	Japanese release
1992	Hudson Hawk	Special FX Software	Game Boy	Japanese release
1992	RoboCop 2	Painting by Numbers	Game Boy	Japanese release
1992	Hook	Painting by Numbers	Famicom	Japanese release
1992	Hook	Painting by Numbers	Game Boy	Japanese release
1992	Hook	Ukiyotei	Super Famicom	
1992	Hakunetsu Pro Yakyuu Ganba League '93	Sting	Super Famicom	
1993	Utopia: The Creation of a Nation	Gremlin Graphics	Super Famicom	Japanese release
1993	Solstice II	Software Creations	Super Famicom	known as Equinox in the Western markets
1993	Hakunetsu Pro Yakyuu Ganba League '94	Sting	Super Famicom	
1994	Karau Ou	Ukiyotei	Super Famicom	known as Skyblazer in the Western markets
as Sony Music Entertainment Japan
1993	The Seven Colors: Legend of PSY・S City	Virtual East Corporation	Macintosh	
1994	Bakuden Unbalance Zone	Kogado Studio	Mega CD	
1994	Bakuden Unbalance Zone	Kogado Studio	PC Engine CD	
1994	Eastern Mind: The Lost Souls of Tong Nou	OutSide Director's Company	Microsoft Windows	
1994	Eastern Mind: The Lost Souls of Tong Nou	OutSide Director's Company	Macintosh	
1994	Ginga no Uo: Ursa Minor Blue	Au ga areba Daijobu Ltd.	Microsoft Windows	
1994	Ginga no Uo: Ursa Minor Blue	Au ga areba Daijobu Ltd.	Macintosh	
1995	Kileak: The Blood	Genki	PlayStation	known as Kileak: The DNA Imperative in North America
1995	Chu-Teng	OutSide Directors Company	Microsoft Windows	
1995	Chu-Teng	OutSide Directors Company	Macintosh	
1995	Kileak: The Blood 2	Genki	PlayStation	known as Epidemic in North America
1995	Two-Tenkaku	Energy Corporation	PlayStation	
1996	AirAssault	SingleTrac	Microsoft Windows	Japanese release
1996	Twisted Metal	SingleTrac	Microsoft Windows	Japanese release
1996	eexy life: East End X Yuri	Cosmo Technology	PlayStation	
1997	Kowloon's Gate	Zeque	PlayStation	
1997	Naniwa no Akindo: Futte Nanbo no Saikoro Jinsei	OeRSTED	PlayStation	
1997	Lagnacure	Art System	PlayStation	
1997	DamDam StompLand	Atelier Double	PlayStation	
1998	Denki Groove Jigoku V	Opus	PlayStation	
1998	Ritti Ninja Katsugeki Tenchu	Acquire	PlayStation	published in Western markets by Activision as Tenchu: Stealth Assassins
1998	Iceman: Digital Playstage	Sony Music Entertainment (Japan)	PlayStation	
1998	Kahen Soukou Gunbike: Speed Power Gunbike	Inti Creates	PlayStation	
1998	Jingle Cats: Love Para Daisakusen no Maki	Vantan International Co., Ltd.	PlayStation	
1998	Jingle Cats: Love Para Daisakusen no Maki	Vantan International Co., Ltd.	Microsoft Windows	
1998	Jingle Cats: Love Para Daisakusen no Maki	Vantan International Co., Ltd.	Macintosh	
1998	Robots: Video Academy	Sony Music Entertainment (Japan)	PlayStation	
1998	Gangway Monsters	Sony Music Entertainment (Japan)	PlayStation	
1999	Click Medic	Game Freak	PlayStation	
1999	Ritta Ninja Katsugeki Tenchu: Shinobi-Gaisen	Acquire	PlayStation	
1999	Meguri Aishite	Sony Music Entertainment (Japan)	PlayStation	
1999	Puffy no P.S. I Love You	Sony Music Entertainment (Japan)	PlayStation	
1999	Itsuka, Kasanariau Ashita e: Shirou-hen	MBA International	PlayStation	
1999	Itsuka, Kasanariau Ashita e: Sayuri-hen	MBA International	PlayStation	
1999	Yoshimoto Muchicco Daikessen: Minami no Umi no Gorongo Shima	Polygon Magic	PlayStation	
1999	Rittai Ninja Katsugeki Tenchu: Shinobi-Hyakusen	Acquire	PlayStation	
1999	Fun! Fun! Pingu	CAPS Inc.	PlayStation	
2000	Lagnacure Legend	Art System	PlayStation	publishing rights sold to Artdink Corporation before release
2000	Ritti Ninja Katsugeki Tenchu 2	Acquire	PlayStation	publishing rights sold to Acquire before release; known as Tenchu 2: Birth of the Stealth Assassins in the Western markets by Activision
2000	Kickboy	Sony Music Entertainment (Japan)	Microsoft Windows	
2001	Space Venus Starring Morning Musume	Sony Music Entertainment (Japan)	PlayStation 2	
2001	Visual Mix Ayumi Hamasaki Dome Tour 2001	Avex	PlayStation 2	
2003	Over the Monochrome Rainbow	Opera House	PlayStation 2	
2003	Motion Gravure Series: Nemoto Harumi	Sony Music Entertainment (Japan)	PlayStation 2	
2003	Motion Gravure Series: Kitagawa Tomomi	Sony Music Entertainment (Japan)	PlayStation 2	
2003	Motion Gravure Series: Mori Hiroko	Sony Music Entertainment (Japan)	PlayStation 2	
2003	Motion Gravure Series: Megumi	Sony Music Entertainment (Japan)	PlayStation 2	
2003	Dice Fantasy	Sony Music Entertainment (Japan)	Microsoft Windows	
2004	wordimagesoundplay	Tomato	PlayStation 2	

=== Unties ===
Sony Music Entertainment announced the launch of its first video game publishing label, Unties, in October 2017. Unties will publish indie games for the PlayStation 4, PlayStation VR, Nintendo Switch, and PC. The name was selected by Sony as representative of helping to "unleash" the power of independent video game development and "unshackle" such developers from the traditional video game publishing process.

Unties' first release was Tiny Metal, a turn-based tactics video game developed by Area 35, for the Nintendo Switch, PS4, and PC. The game was first premiered at PAX West Indie Megabooth. Published Azure Reflections, a side-scrolling bullet hell developed by Souvenir Circ., on May 15, 2018, for the PS4. Published Touhou Gensou Wanderers Reloaded, a roguelike rpg developed by Aqua Style, for the PS4, Nintendo Switch, and PC. Published Necrosphere, a platformer developed by Cat Nigiri, for the PS4, Nintendo Switch, PC, and PSVita. Published Midnight Sanctuary, a VR/3D Novel game developed by CAVYHOUSE, for the PS4, Nintendo Switch and PC. Published Tokyo Dark, a visual novel mystery adventure hybrid developed by Cherrymochi, for the PC. Published Chiki-Chiki Boxy Racers, an arcade racing game developed by Pocket, for the Nintendo Switch on August 30, 2018. Scheduled to publish on Last Standard, a 3d action game developed by I From Japan, intended for PC. Scheduled to publish The Good Life, a daily-life rpg developed by White Owls Inc., for the PS4 and PC. Scheduled to publish Merkava Avalanche, a 3d cavalry warfare action game developed by WinterCrownWorks, for the PC. Scheduled to publish Olija, an action adventure game developed by Skeleton Crew Studio, for the PC. Scheduled to publish Deemo Reborn, a music rhythm and urban fantasy game developed by Taiwanese studio Rayak, for the PS4 with PSVR support. Scheduled to publish Giraffe and Anika, a 3d adventure game developed by Atelier Mimina, for the PS4, Nintendo Switch and PC. Scheduled to publish 3rd Eye, a 2d horror exploration game, based on the Touhou franchise, for the PS4, Nintendo Switch, and PC. Scheduled to publish Gensokyo Defenders, a tower-defense game developed by Neetpia, for the PS4 and Nintendo Switch. In 2019, Unties was dropped from the Sony group and became the new company Phoenixx.

=== Increased competition ===
The company's leading role on the Japanese market was increasingly challenged by labels such as Avex (where SMEJ formerly owned 5 percent of shares). Net sales for the fiscal year ending March 31, 1997, were down 10% to 103 billion yen, while net income fell 41% to 7.7 billion yen. The market share at that time was less than 18%. In August 1997, Dreams Come True, until that point Sony Music Entertainment Japan's best-selling act, signed a worldwide multi-album deal with competing U.S. label Virgin Records America.

Since then, it was said that SMEJ ceded to Avex's challenge, but SMEJ bounced back and regained leadership from its indie rival until 2012. SMEJ netted 22.4 billion yen for 1H 2012 and 14.3% of the market, second behind Avex (24.95 B yen, 15.9%).

In May 2017, SMEJ, through subsidiary Sony Music Marketing (now Sony Music Solutions), acquired the physical retail and distribution rights to releases of another rival, Warner Music Japan.

On June 11, 2025, SMEJ, via Sony Music Labels, acquired the rights to the Spookiz series, including its characters from Keyring.

On April 1, 2026, SMEJ and Universal Music Japan launched a joint venture company Nine by Nine, aiming to operating music festivals in Asia.

== Group companies ==
=== Aniplex ===
Aniplex logo since 2003

Aniplex Inc. is the SMEJ subsidiary responsible for the production, distribution and licensing of Japanese animation and related media. Established in September 1995, it became a wholly owned subsidiary of Sony Music Japan in 2001. Aniplex has been involved in various major anime franchises like Fullmetal Alchemist, Puella Magi Madoka Magica, and Demon Slayer. The company also produces stage plays and publishes video games, notably the highly successful mobile game Fate/Grand Order.

=== Sony Music Labels ===
Sony Music (Japan) Logo

Sony Music Labels Inc. (SML) is the primary subsidiary of SMEJ's music division, tasked with the consolidated management and operation of the company's many record labels and large musical artist roster. SML was established to create a unified strategy across various genres and market segments. Its high-profile imprints include Sony Music Records, Epic Records Japan, Ki/oon Music, and Sacra Music. It also holds 50% ownership of the talent agencies of the Sakamichi Series idol groups: Nogizaka46, LLC, which manages Nogizaka46, and Seed & Flower, which manages Hinatazaka46 and Sakurazaka46.

=== Sony Music Solutions ===
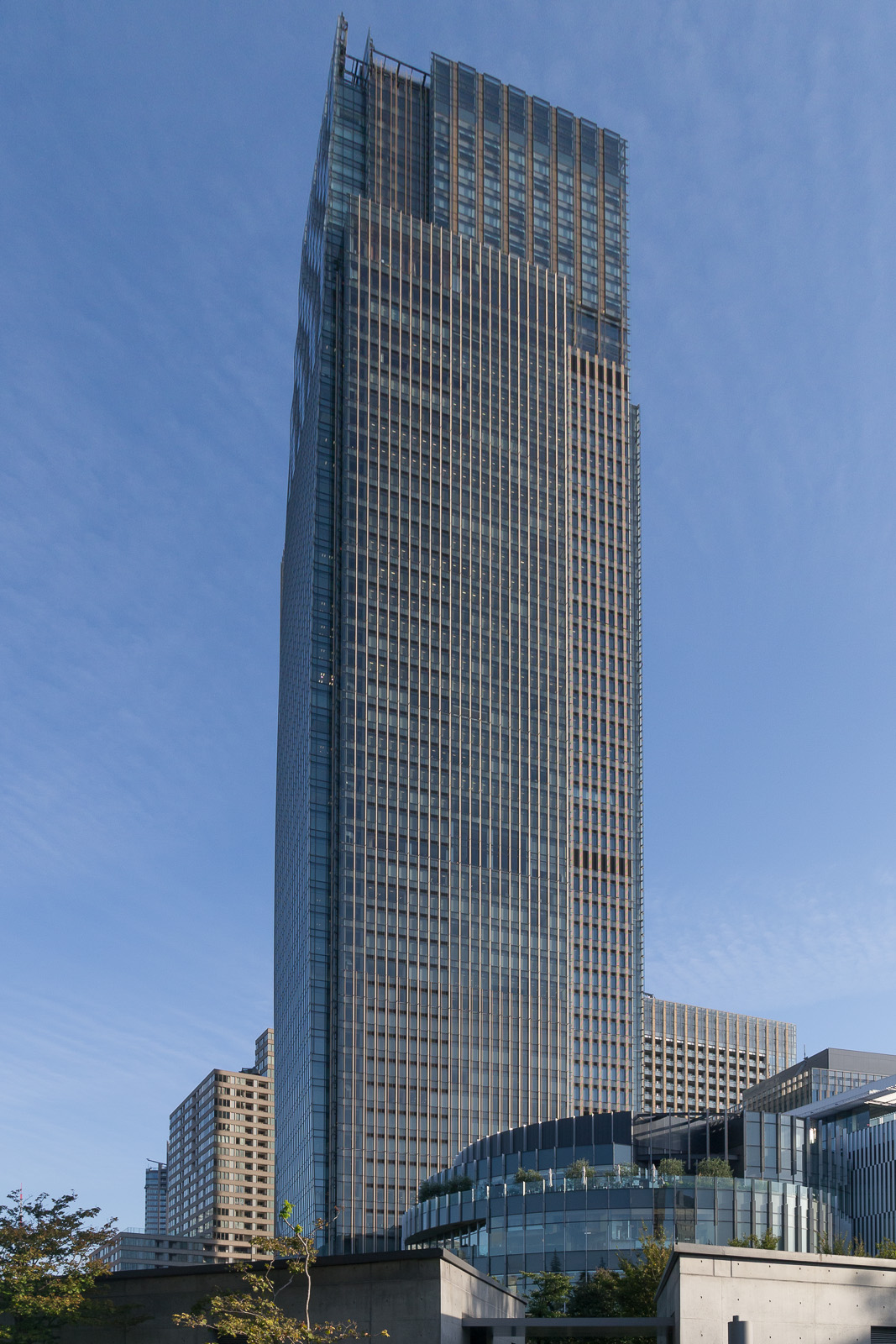
The headquarters of Sony Music Solutions is located in the Tokyo Midtown Tower.

Sony Music Solutions Inc. (SMS) serves as the comprehensive services and infrastructure arm of SMEJ. Its extensive responsibilities include the manufacturing, packaging, and physical distribution of music and video content for all group labels. Beyond logistics, SMS is the key provider for fan-facing activities, managing concert and live event production, organizing 2.5D musicals and exhibitions, overseeing the planning and sales of merchandise, and operating official fan clubs. The subsidiary also develops various digital and technology-based solutions to support the group's entertainment businesses.

=== Sony Music Artists ===
Sony Music Artists Inc. (SMA) is the major talent and artist management agency within the SMEJ group. It handles the careers of numerous Japanese musicians, actors, voice actors, and tarento. SMA provides management, booking, and promotional services, operating as a crucial link between the artists and the recording labels and production houses.

=== MusicRay'n Inc. ===
MusicRay'n Inc. is a talent management agency specializing in voice acting and music. It focuses on the discovery and development of Seiyū.

=== Other services ===
- Antinos Management America Inc. – Overseas marketing and promotion of SMEJ artists
- Monogatary.com – Named after a stylized romanization of monogatari (物語, 'story'), a social networking service about creative writing and illustrations founded in October 2017. Has collaborated with SMEJ artists, most notably Yoasobi, which was initially formed to create music based on selected stories on the site.
- Sony Creative Products – Character & Franchise licensing/distribution in the Japanese market, usually working with overseas characters, such as the Peanuts franchise (Note: SCP held the licensing rights of Peanuts in Japan since 2010. Later in 2018, SMEJ bought 39% of DHX Media's stake in Peanuts Worldwide LLC.) and Pingu.
- Zepp Hall Network Inc. – Operates 11 concert halls in Japan, Taiwan and Malaysia

== Labels ==
=== Active labels ===
- Sony Music Labels
  - Sony Music Records
    - Sony Records – formerly known as CBS/Sony since 1968
    - GR8! Records (read "G-R-eight") – founded April 2003
    - Mastersix Foundation
      - No Label Music – vanity label founded by Chanmina
    - 22/7
    - Niagara Records – private label of Eiichi Ohtaki
    - Sony Music Japan International – distribution label for music from international version of Sony Music
  - Echoes
  - Epic Records Japan – formerly known as Epic/Sony since 1971
  - Kioon Music – launched as Kioon Sony Records on April 1, 1992
  - SME Records – founded in 1998 and took over the Japanese anime television series "Pocket Monsters" since 2013.
  - Sony Music Associated Records – given this name in 2001.
    - Onenation – joint venture with LDH Japan
  - Ariola Japan – formerly known as BMG Japan until October 2009.
  - Sacra Music – anison label since 2017
  - Sony Music Direct – founded as Sony Music House in 1996. Continues to use "Walking Eye" logo. Became part of Sony Music Labels in 2022.
- Nogizaka46 LLC – label of Nogizaka46 (joint venture with KeyHolder)

=== Defunct labels ===
- Dohb Discs (1994–2000)
- Antinos Records – launched in 1994 with Sony Music director Shigeo Maruyama as its president. The first releases on August 21 were a mini-album by indie group Confusion and singles by the groups Aniss, Neverending Story, and Ginji Itoh. (1994–2004, merged into Epic Records Japan)
- Studioseven Recordings (2006–2010, merged into Gr8! Records)
- Tofu Records (US sub-label, 2003–2007)
- Defstar Records – (2000–2015, merged into SME Records)
- Pikachu Records – (1997–2012, merged into SME Records and Sony Music Labels)
- VVV records
- Okeh – launched in 1994 and headed by Sony Music deputy president Hiroshi Inagaki.
- Former sub-labels of Sony Music Associated Records
  - True Kiss Disc – private label of Tetsuya Komuro
  - Tributelink – Temporary label in 2001
  - Terry Dollar Records – formerly private label of Oreskaband
  - Yeah! Yeah! Yeah! Records – (2005–2010)
- Former sub-labels of Ki/oon Music
  - Fitz Beat
  - Haunted Records
  - Ki/oon Records2
  - Neosite
  - Siren Song – formerly private label of X Japan
  - Trefort
- Quatro A

== Notable artists ==
- 2AM
- 2PM
- 9nine
- 9Lana
- Abingdon Boys School
- Access
- Aco
- Adieu
- Aimer
- AKB48 (2006–2008)
- Aki Toyosaki
- ALI
- Alpha Drive One
- Ami Suzuki (1998–2001)
- An Cafe
- And2ble
- Angela Aki
- Aoi Eir
- Aqua Timez
- Asian Kung-Fu Generation
- Automatic Loveletter
- Ayahi Takagaki
- Babymonster
- Beat Crusaders
- Boom Boom Satellites
- The Boss
- The Boyz
- The Brilliant Green
- Buckethead
- Chai
- Chara (1990–2004, 2012–present)
- Chemistry
- Chiaki Kuriyama
- Cinder Road
- ClariS
- Coldrain
- Cool Joke
- The Cro-Magnons
- Creepy Nuts
- Crossfaith
- Crystal Kay (1999–2011)
- Dancing Dolls
- Dead or Alive
- Debbie Gibson
- Depapepe
- Denki Groove
- Dir En Grey
- Does
- Dreams Come True
- Egoist
- Eric Martin
- Fight Like Apes
- Flow
- Galileo Galilei
- Garnidelia (2014–2021)
- The Gazette
- Got7 (2014–2021)
- Halcali
- Hajime Chitose
- Haruka Tomatsu
- Harumi Tsuyuzaki
- Hikaru Utada
- Himeka (2009–2012)
- Hinatazaka46
- Hitorie
- Home Made Kazoku
- Hyde
- I Am Ghost
- I Wish
- Ikimono Gakari
- Ikue Ōtani
- Ive
- Jasmine
- Jinn
- Joe Inoue
- Judy Ongg
- Jay Sean
- Judy and Mary (1991–2001)
- June
- JY
- K
- Kalafina (2007–2019)
- Kana Hanazawa (2012–2021)
- Kana Nishino
- Kelun
- Ken Hirai
- Kenshi Yonezu
- Kep1er
- King Gnu
- Konomi Suzuki
- Kotaro Oshio
- Kung Faux
- L'Arc-en-Ciel
- Lama
- Led Zepagain
- Little by Little
- Ling Tosite Sigure
- LiSA
- Loick Essien
- Long Shot Party
- Luna Haruna
- Maboroshi
- Mai Hoshimura
- Man with a Mission
- Masahiko Kondō
- Masakazu Morita
- Mayu Watanabe
- MBLAQ
- Meisa Kuroki
- Michi/michimemoir
- MiChi
- Miho Fukuhara
- Mika Nakashima
- Milet
- Miliyah Kato
- Minako Kotobuki
- Minami Kuribayashi
- Miwa
- Miyu Nagase
- Mucc (2011–2017)
- Nami Tamaki
- Nana Kitade
- Naniwa Express
- Natsume Mito
- Nexz
- Nico Touches the Walls
- NiziU
- No3b (2008–2013)
- Nobodyknows
- Nogizaka46
- Nothing's Carved in Stone
- NU'EST
- Oh My Girl
- Orange Range
- Oreskaband
- Piko
- Polysics
- Porno Graffitti
- Prague
- Puffy AmiYumi (1996–2015)
- Rei Yasuda
- Reol
- ReoNa
- Rie Fu
- Rina Chinen
- Rica Matsumoto
- Rize
- Rythem
- Sachiko Kobayashi
- Kyōko Saitō
- Saki Kubota (1979–1984)
- Sakurazaka46
- Sambomaster
- SawanoHiroyuki[nZk]
- Sayaka Kanda
- Scandal
- School Food Punishment
- Seamo (2002–2011; 2019–)
- Secret (2011–2013)
- Seiko Matsuda
- Siam Shade
- Shinichi Osawa
- Shion Tsuji
- Shoko Nakagawa
- SID
- SixTones
- Soul'd Out
- Soulhead
- Sowelu
- Spyair
- Stance Punks
- Stephanie
- Stereopony
- Stray Kids
- SunSet Swish
- Supercell
- T.M.Revolution
- Tamio Okuda
- TFN
- TiA
- TripleS
- TK from Ling tosite sigure
- Totalfat
- Tomoko Kawase
- Tomohisa Sako
- Tomohisa Yamashita
- Toshinobu Kubota
- Tube
- Uri Nakayama
- Uverworld
- Vaundy
- Whitesnake (1982–1994)
- Wonder Girls
- X Japan
- Yellow Generation
- Yoasobi
- Yoshida Brothers
- Younha
- Yui
- Yuna Ito
- Yuya Matsushita
- Zebrahead
- Zerobaseone
- Zone

=== Actors ===
- Ken Ishiguro
- Satoshi Ichijo
- Yuki Ito
- Shota Inoue
- Shutaro Kadoshi
- Kyôhei Kanomi
- Yuki Kura
- Ryo Takasugi
- Ryo Narita
- Nishikiori Gekidan
- Kazuhiko Nishimura
- Rio Masuzawa
- Meguro-eup
- Yuki Morinaga
- Yuma Yamoto
- Daichi Watanabe
- Yutaro Watanabe

=== Actress ===
- Misato Aoyama
- Haruka Echigo
- Maya Okano
- Ririka Kato
- Miho Kitagawa
- Yuki Kimoto
- Sayu Kubota
- Kana Kurashina
- Kokusho Sayuri
- Yuki Saso
- Saki Sato
- Hakusan Himeashi
- Riho Takada
- Rina Takeda
- Tao Tsuchiya
- Eriko Tomiyama
- Riko Nagase
- Natsukawa Asa
- Fumi Nikaido
- Tomoko Nozaki
- Ai Hashimoto
- Mayumi Hasegawa
- Kaoru Hirata
- Kiyo Matsumoto
- Misato Morita
- Nana Mori
- Kanna Mori
- Ririka
- Misako Renbutsu

== Other people ==
- Norio Ohga
- Akio Morita
- Toshio Ozawa
- Shugo Matsuo
- Ryokichi Kunugi
- Shigeo Maruyama
- Takashi Yoshida† (died 2010, transferred to Warner Music before death)
- Vivid
- Hiroshi Inagaki (now on Avex Group)
- Naoki Kitagawa
- Kazutomo Enomoto
- Yaz Noya (Tofu Records founder)
- Nozomi Sasaki
- Masatoshi Sakai† (record producer from 1968, died 2021)

== See also ==
- Sony Music Entertainment
- BMG Japan
- Music On! TV – SMEJ-owned cable TV network

=== Key rivals ===
- Avex Group (once an affiliate of Sony Music, also the second biggest record label in Japan)
- Universal Music Japan
- Warner Music Japan
