= Yasuaki Fujita =

Yasuaki Fujita 藤田 靖明
- Also known as: Bun Bun
- Born: Fukuyama, Hiroshima Prefecture, Japan
- Genres: Video game music, chiptune
- Occupations: Composer, sound designer
- Instrument: Keyboards
- Years active: 1989–2000, 2010
- Website: yasuaki-fujita.sakura.ne.jp/first_circle/

Yasuaki Fujita (藤田 靖明, Fujita Yasuaki) is a video game composer and sound designer. Best known for his work with Capcom, he normally went by the alias of Bun Bun.

During the NES era, he worked on the music for Mega Man 3 (in lieu of Harumi Fujita), Tenchi wo Kurau II, The Little Mermaid, and Darkwing Duck for Capcom. After the NES era, he created the majority of the music for Breath of Fire (video game), while doing a few pieces for Final Fight 2, along with a few other projects. He was also one of the keyboardists for the Capcom house band, Alph Lyla, before they disbanded in the late 1990s. He also designed the well known 16-bit era Capcom logo jingle.

== Works ==
Year	Title	Role(s)	Notes
1989	Final Fight	Music composer	With various others
1990	Mega Man 3	Music composer	With Harumi Fujita
1991	Who Framed Roger Rabbit	Music composer	Game Boy version
1991	Mega Man 4	Sound designer	
1991	Buster Bros.	Sound designer	TurboGrafx-CD version
1991	Tenchi wo Kurau II: Shokatsu Kōmei Den	Music composer	
1991	The Little Mermaid	Music composer	
1992	Darkwing Duck	Music composer	
1993	The Shinri Game: Akuma no Kokoroji	Music composer	
1993	Skyblazer	Sound effects	
1993	Final Fight 2	Music composer	With various others
1993	Breath of Fire	Music composer	With various others
1994	Panic in Nakayoshi World	Music composer	With Harumi Fujita
1994	Bishōjo Senshi Sailor Moon S: Kondo wa Puzzle de Oshioki yo!!	Sound effects	
1994	Eye of the Beholder	Music composer	"Capcom Logo" jingle
1995	Tarot Mystery	Music composer	
1995	Todd McFarlane's Spawn: The Video Game	Sound effects	
1996	The King of Fighters '95	Music composer	Playstation version
1996	Punky Skunk	Music composer	With Harumi Fujita
1996	Cooly Skunk: Demo	Music composer	With Harumi Fujita
1997	Tomba!	Sound effects	
1998	Blazing Star	Sound designer	
1998	Real Bout Garō Densetsu Special: Dominated Mind	Sound designer	
1999	Bust-a-Move Pocket	Music composer	
1999	Metal Slug 1st Mission	Music composer	
2000	Metal Slug 2nd Mission	Music composer	
2000	Magical Tetris Challenge	Sound designer	Game Boy Color version
2010	Mega Man 10	Music composer	With various others
2015	Traced to Puzzle	Music composer	
2015	Water Flows	Music composer	
2016	Tap and Carry	Music composer	
2017	Explosion Slime	Music composer	
2018	Aztec Number	Music composer	
