= Punky Skunk =

1996 video game

- North American cover art
- Developer: Ukiyotei
- Publishers: JP: Visit; NA: Jaleco
- Director: Kaori Naruse
- Producer: Kazunobu Morimoto
- Designer: Kenshi Naruse
- Programmers: Norihiro Tokeshi; Satoshi Kuroda; Tadakatsu Makiuchi
- Artists: Midori Nasu; Michiyo Komura; Rika Ueno
- Composers: Harumi Fujita; Yasuaki Fujita
- Platform: PlayStation
- Release: JP: 1 November 1996; NA: February 1998
- Genres: Action, platform
- Mode: Single-player

Punky Skunk (Note: Also known as Cooly Skunk (Japanese: クーリースカンク, Hepburn: Kūrī Sukanku) in Japan.) is a side-scrolling action-platform video game developed by Ukiyotei and published by Visit in Japan on 1 November 1996 and by Jaleco in North America in 1998 for the PlayStation. It takes place on a set of island archipiélagos where the wolf Badler and his legion of mouse-like Chews are threatening to pollute the locations through industries and machinery. Players assume the role of the titular skunk in an attempt to overthrow Badler and his BB Brigade army with the help of his companions Nash and Kelly. Its gameplay mainly consists of platforming using a main three-button configuration.

Punky Skunk was conceived by Ukiyotei founder Kenshi Naruse during his time working at Ukiyotei, which began creating a mascot action game intended for younger audiences reminiscent of Sony's Skyblazer on the Super Famicom as a commission by Bullet-Proof Software; the company later settled on doing a new title directed towards western audiences with Visit using the same game engine after Bullet-Proof Software changed their direction. The arrival of the PlayStation in both eastern and western markets led Ukiyotei to suspend development of the project on the Super Famicom before deciding on making a different version for the PlayStation, while integrating some of their previously established ideas from the original version into the final release.

Upon its release, Punky Skunk was met with mostly negative reception, with critics panning its visual presentation, audio and gameplay.

== Gameplay ==
Gameplay screenshot

Punky Skunk is a side-scrolling action-platform game similar to Skyblazer where the player takes the role of an anthropomorphic skunk named Punky, who settles on saving the world with the aid of his friends Nash and Kelly from the evil BB Brigade army led by Badler as the main objective.

Throughout the stages, players may find a set of special tools for Punky via a "gear" icon, including a skunk spray, a parasail, a pogo stick, inline skates, digging claws and a snowboard. Besides the main stages in the game, minigames are also featured which can benefit Punky in his journey with items like extra lives.

Similar to Super Mario Bros. and Sonic the Hedgehog, there are collectible stars scattered on almost every stage and obtaining 100 of them grants Punky with an extra life. Punky loses a life if he sustains a number of hits or falls of the stage and once all lives are lost, the game is over. Progress in the game is saved via the PlayStation's memory card.

== Development and release ==
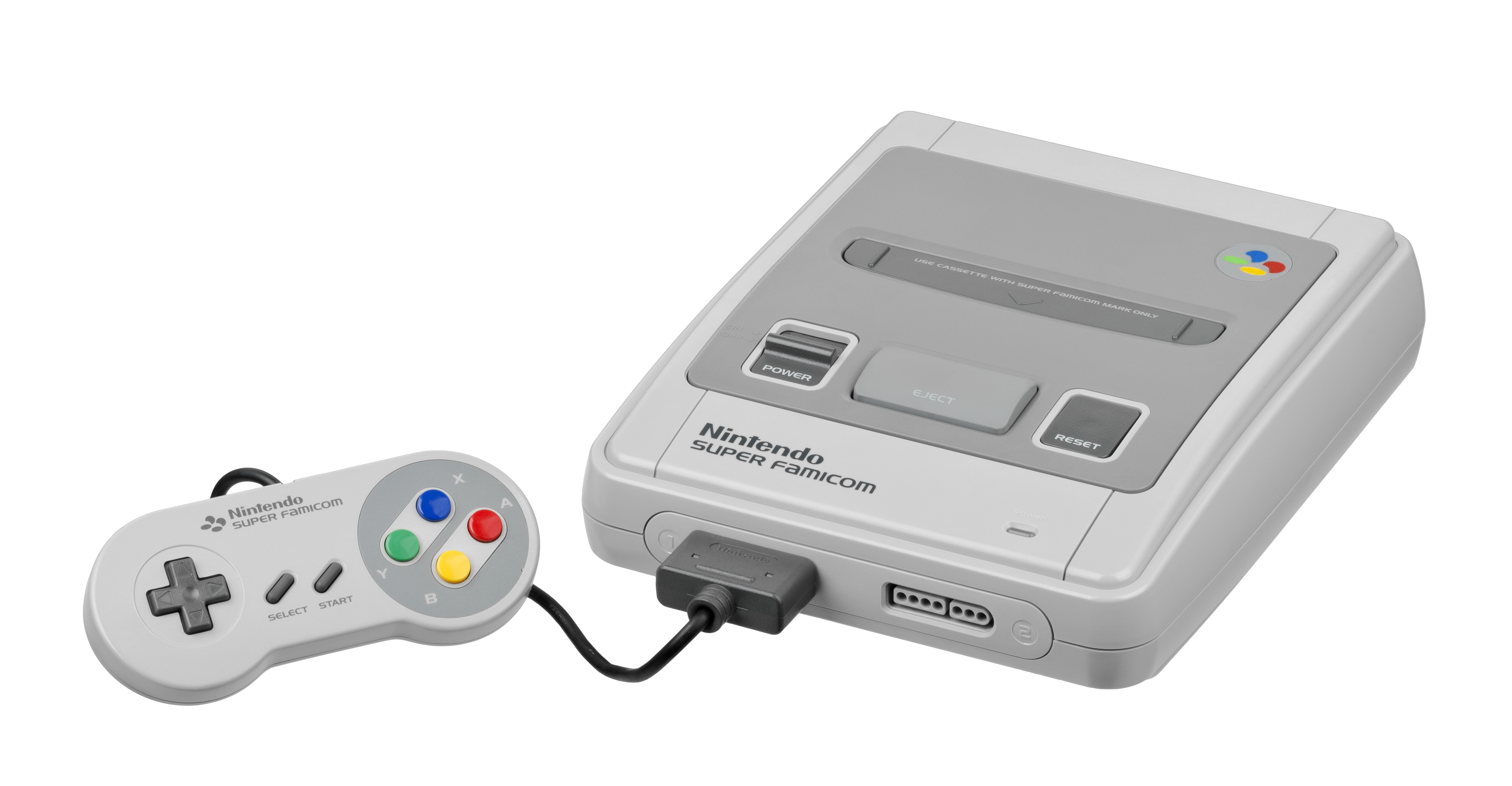
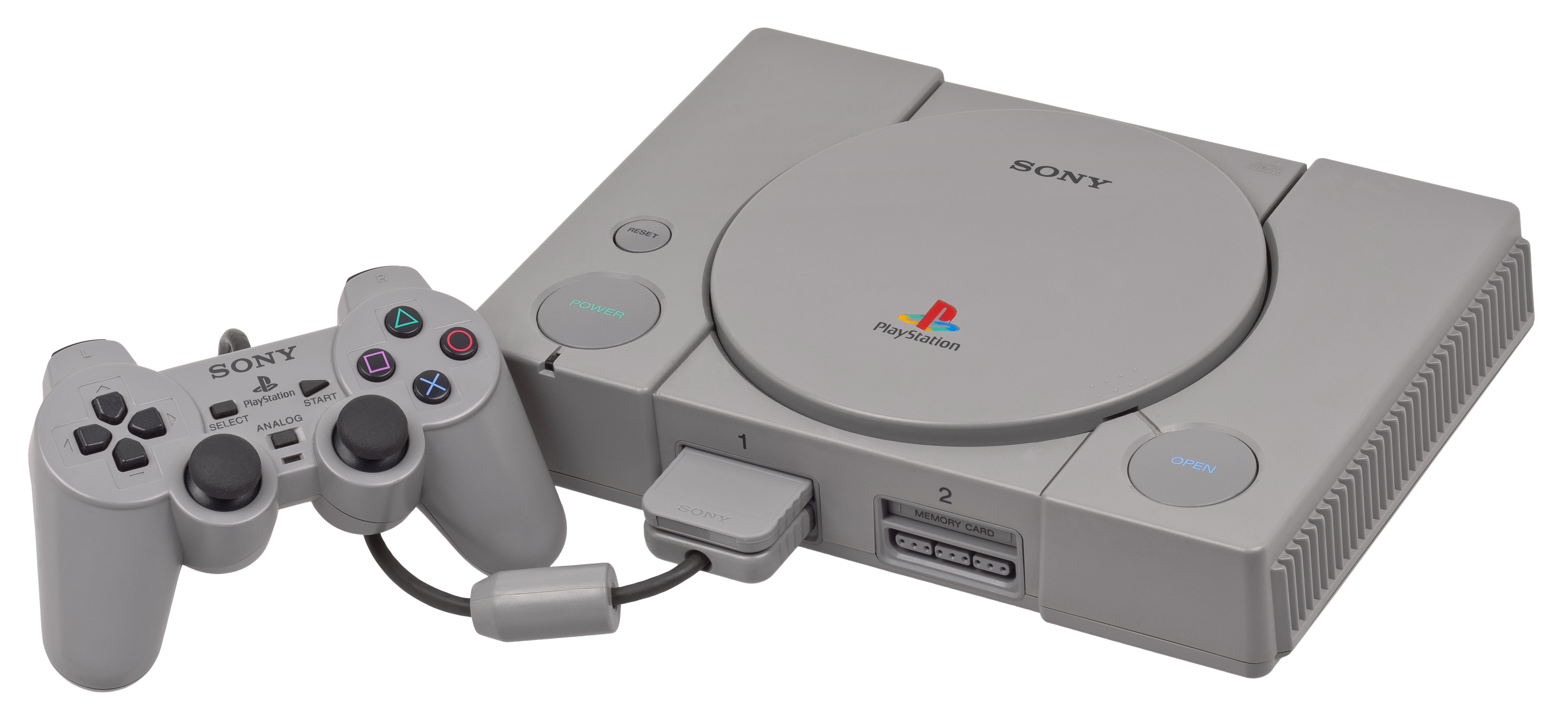
Punky Skunk was initially conceived as a mascot game commissioned by Bullet-Proof Software on Super Famicom, before development on the project restarted and was ultimately shifted by Ukiyotei and Visit towards the PlayStation.

Punky Skunk was the creation of Ukiyotei founder Kenshi Naruse, whose previous works at the company included Hook, Skyblazer and Todd McFarlane's Spawn: The Video Game. Kenshi recounted about the game's development process and history in a 2012 online interview. Kenshi stated that the title went through various circumstances before its eventual release to market, initially starring a different main protagonist on a mascot action game titled Metamoru Kid Gūmin for the Super Famicom as a commission by Bullet-Proof Software, who wanted a game intended for younger audiences while Ukiyotei settled on creating a concept reminiscent of Skyblazer but aimed at kids. Despite work on Metamoru Kid Gūmin being nearly complete, development was later halted due to Bullet-Proof Software changing their direction.

Afterwards, Ukiyotei started negotiations with Japanese publisher Visit, who proposed to the team with reusing the same game engine written for Metamoru Kid Gūmin on a new project but the arrival of PlayStation in Japanese markets led Ukiyotei focusing towards the western market of the Super Famicom instead. Kenshi claimed that Punky's design and main method of attack were a product of Visit, who told the team that "this incorporated the opinions of North American buyers". Although work on the Super Famicom version of Punky Skunk was nearly completed, the launch of the PlayStation in North America and the subsequent decrease in the 16-bit market for Super Famicom titles resulted in suspending its development.

Ukiyotei would later propose Visit in resuming Punky and continue development of Punky Skunk on PlayStation, to which the latter agreed at the request of elements such as the visuals matched the system's capabilities. The programming team used Punky as research in order to code previous techniques they were able to perform with Super Famicom on PlayStation such as character animation and parallax scrolling, as software development kits for the latter console were deemed to be not suitable for 2D titles, converting several elements from the former version while finishing level design and other aspects during the process.

Screenshot from the unreleased Super Famicom version

Punky Skunk was created by most of the same team that previously worked on Skyblazer for the Super Famicom at Ukiyotei. Development was helmed by Kaori and Kenshi Naruse acting as directors, with Kenshi also being its sole game designer. Artists Midori Nasu, Michiyo Komura, Rika Ueno, Sadaki Matsumoto, Tadashi Aoyama and Teruo Nagato were responsible for the character designs and pixel art respectively. Norihiro Tokeshi, Satoshi Kuroda, Tadakatsu Makiuchi, Takeru Yamada and Yasushi Kamiya acted as programmers. Former Capcom composers Harumi and Yasuaki Fujita co-wrote the soundtrack. Visit also collaborated on the project's making as well.

Punky Skunk was first showcased in a playable state on Super Famicom under its Japanese title, Cooly Skunk, at Shoshinkai 1995 and the 1995 Famimaga Earth World show. The game was later previewed in gaming magazine such as Famitsu, touting its launch with a 23 February 1996 release date. The original Super Famicom version of Punky Skunk was never released, due to an alleged decline of the 16-bit format and the launch of PlayStation in North America. Prior to its cancellation on Super Famicom, a playable demo was broadcast via Satellaview. In 2019, the demo was discovered on a 8M Memory Pak at the Japanese video game store Super Potato and a ROM image of said demo was later leaked online in January 2020. Punky Skunk was later moved and eventually published on PlayStation by Visit in Japan on 1 November 1996 under the name Cooly Skunk, and later in North America by Jaleco in February 1998. On 2 December 1999, the game was later re-released as budget title exclusively in Japan.

== Reception ==
Reception

Review scores
Publication	Score
AllGame	1.5/5
Electronic Gaming Monthly	4.5/10; 5.5/10; 6/10; 5/10 (Note: Four critics of Electronic Gaming Monthly each gave the game an individual score.)
Famitsu	6/10; 5/10; 5/10; 5/10 (Note: Four critics of Famitsu each gave the game an individual score.)
Game Informer	7/10
Next Generation	1/5
Official U.S. PlayStation Magazine	3/5
PlayStation: The Official Magazine	2/5
Dengeki PlayStation	60/100, 60/100
Game-X	2/5

Punky Skunk was met with mostly negative reviews from critics since its release. It earned a 21 out of 40 total score from Japanese magazine Famitsu based on individual scores of 6, 5, 5, and 5. Electronic Gaming Monthly's four reviewers remarked that the game is fun enough and colorful enough to appeal to young children, but the extremely short and easy levels, derivative and simplistic gameplay, excessively happy music, and dated graphics would utterly bore older gamers. Next Generation rated it one star out of five, stating "Nuts to this - you might as well hook up your SNES and play Zero the Kamikaze Squirrel." They cited the complete lack of PlayStation-specific effects and the dull, derivative gameplay. PSM similarly panned the game's graphics, stating that they did not take full advantage of the PlayStation's hardware. The editors felt its rudimentary design resembled something from the previous console generation and compared it unfavorably to 2D platformers such as Castlevania: Symphony of the Night and Klonoa: Door to Phantomile, remarking "it's like the game was programmed on the Yaroze." Although the magazine declared that its levels and bonus minigames did have enough variety to "squeeze a small iota of fun" from the title, they concluded that its simple gameplay meant it was targeted to a much younger audience than the average PlayStation user.

In 2006 Electronic Gaming Monthly criticized the game's marketing for claiming the titular character had attitude, stating Punky was "...a Generation X skunk with an attitude!". The titular character is ranked eighth on Game Informer's list of "the top 10 worst character names". Ryan Geddes of IGN considered the game and its English title to be equally bad. Screen Rant's Evan Hopkins stated that "by the time the game released in 1996, gamers were over colorful 2D platformers, and Punky Skunk landed with a resounding thud. Compound this failure with gameplay that stunk as bad as its protagonist, and you've got a mascot platformer that never stood a chance."

== Legacy ==
Licensed merchandise such as a shirt, sweater, mug, mask, and sticker were released in 2021.
