= Epic Records Japan =

Japanese record label

- Parent company: Sony Music Labels Inc. (2014–present); Previously; Sony Music Entertainment Japan (1978–1998, 2001–2014)
- Founded: 1978; 48 years ago (original); 2001; 25 years ago (relaunch)
- Founder: Shigeo Maruyama
- Defunct: 1998 (original)
- Distributor: Sony Music Solutions
- Genre: Various, mainly J-pop and J-rock, formerly video games
- Country of origin: Japan
- Official website: epic-jp.net

Epic Records Japan is a Japanese record label owned by Sony Music Labels Inc., a subsidiary of Sony Music Entertainment Japan. Its founder was Shigeo Maruyama.

Between 1978 and 1988 the label operated as a wholly owned subsidiary: Epic/Sony Inc. (株式会社EPIC・ソニー), established in August 1978 and was later folded back into CBS/Sony Group in March 1988.

In 2001, it was re-established as Epic Records Japan Inc. (株式会社エピックレコードジャパン, Kabushiki Gaisha Epikku Rekoodo Japan). In 2014, Sony Music Records Inc. absorbed Epic Records Japan Inc. alongside other Sony Japan subsidiaries, changing its name to Sony Music Labels. Since the absorption, Epic Records Japan has operated as an imprint of Sony Music Labels.

Notable music artists for this company have included Hikaru Utada, Tetsuya Komuro, and Kimiko Itoh.

== Games published ==
During the late 1980s and early 1990s they also published video games for Nintendo consoles.

- 1987 - Tokoro-san no Mamoru mo Semeru mo for Famicom – developed by HAL Laboratory
- 1988 - Vegas Dream for Famicom
- 1989 - 飛ing ヒーロー Flying Hero for Famicom – developed by Aicom
- 1989 - Tashiro Masashi no Princess ga Ippai for Famicom
- 1990 - サッカー・ボーイ Soccer Boy = Soccer Mania for Game Boy
- 1990 - Solstice for Famicom – developed by Software Creations (UK)
- 1991 - RoboCop for Game Boy
- 1991 - Hakunetsu Pro Yakyuu Ganba League = Extra Innings for Famicom – developed by Sting
- 1991 - Jerry Ball = Smart Ball for Super Famicom
- 1991 - Dragon's Lair for Famicom – developed by Motivetime
- 1991 - Dragon's Lair for Game Boy – developed by Motivetime
- 1991 - Altered Space for Game Boy
- 1991 - Xenon 2: Megablast for X68000 and PC-98 - developed by The Bitmap Brothers
- 1991 - Hudson Hawk for Famicom
- 1992 - Hudson Hawk for Game Boy
- 1992 - Robocop2 for Game Boy
- 1992 - Hook for Famicom – developed by Ocean
- 1992 - Hook for Game Boy – developed by Ocean
- 1992 - Hook for Super Famicom – developed by Ukiyotei
- 1992 - Ganba League '93 for Super Famicom – developed by Sting
- 1993 - ユートピア = Utopia: The Creation of a Nation for Super Famicom
- 1993 - Solstice II = Equinox for Super Famicom – developed by Software Creations
- 1993 - Ganba League '94
- 1994 - Karura Ou = Skyblazer for Super Famicom – developed by Ukiyotei

The video game name was dissolved shortly after the announcement of PlayStation, with all future titles went directly under the Sony Music Entertainment Japan banner.

== Former imprints ==
- Antinos
- Dohb Discs
- So What? Records
- Kowalski
- mf Records (joint venture with Motoharu Sano)
- Mint Age

== Current artists ==
- 2PM
- 7!!
- Abingdon Boys School
- Akeboshi, Yoshio
- And2ble
- Angela Aki
- Aqua Timez
- Kousuke Atari
- Aura
- Brian the Sun
- Centimillimental
- Cinemusica
- The Condors
- Daisuke
- Deen
- Dreams Come True
- Dustz
- Hajime, Chitose
- Got7
- Gyubin
- Halcali
- Hanabie.
- Haneyuri
- Hikaru Utada
- Ikimono-gakari
- Yuki
- Sawa
- LGMonkees (No Doubt Tracks/Epic)
- LMYK
- Lizabet
- Yui Makino
- Nao Matsushita
- Yuya Matsushita
- Yukie Nakama
- Nangi
- Naoto
- Nexz
- NiziU
- No3b
- Nodame Orchestra
- Nothing's Carved in Stone
- Pengin
- Motoharu Sano (Epic/mf)
- Shigi
- Solita
- Stance Punks (Epic/Kowalski/Dynamord)
- Stray Kids
- Sugaru, Matsutani (Epic/Informel)
- Masaki Suda
- Masayuki Suzuki
- Takachiya
- Yutaka Take
- Theatre Brook
- T.M.Revolution
- Uranino
- Anne Watanabe
- Misato Watanabe
- Yacht

== Former artists ==
- ViViD
- Crystal Kay
