= Hell night =

Hell night or hellnight may refer to:

- Hell Night, a 1981 horror film by Tom DeSimone
- Hellnight, a Japanese horror video game by Atlus Co

== See also ==
- Hazing, a ritualistic test used as a means of initiation into a social group
- Devil's Night, October 30, a night of vandalism and other mischief in some parts of the United States
- Hell Knights, creatures from the Doom video game series
