= Music On! TV =

Music On! TV M-On!
- Country: Japan

Programming
- Language: Japanese
- Picture format: 1080i HDTV

Ownership
- Owner: Sony Music Solutions

History
- Launched: July 1, 1998; 28 years ago
- Former names: Viewsic (1998–2004)

Links
- Website: www.m-on.jp

M-On Entertainment, Inc.
- Type: subsidiary
- Industry: music industry, television, publishing
- Founded: March 2, 1998 (as SME TV, Inc.); March 31, 2012 (merger with Sony Magazines)
- Founder: Shigeo Maruyama
- Headquarters: Roppongi, Minato, Tokyo, Japan
- Parent: Sony Music Entertainment Japan, Inc.
- Website: www.m-on-ent.jp

Music On! TV (ミュージック・オン・ティーヴィ, Myujikku On Tivi; typeset as MUSIC ON! TV), also known as M-On! (エムオン, Emu On!), is a Japanese music cable television network operated by Sony Music Solutions, a subsidiary of Sony Music Entertainment Japan, Inc. (SMEJ).

Its motto is We Believe in Music.

== History ==
Viewsic logo.

- March 2, 1998 - M-On Entertainment, Inc. was founded by the Sony Music management as SME TV, Inc. (株式会社エスエムイー・ティーヴィ, Kabushiki Gaisha Esu Emu I Tivi).
- July 1, 1998 - SME TV, Inc. launched Viewsic (ヴュージック, Viyujikku) (portmanteau of view and music).
- June 1, 2002 - Viewsic was launched on SKY PerfecTV! e2.
- May 1, 2004 - Viewsic was relaunched as Music On! TV.
- October 1, 2009 - Music On! TV was launched in high-definition television.
- March 31, 2012 - Music On! TV, Inc. was merged with sister company Sony Magazines Co., Ltd., becoming M-On Entertainment, Inc. and launched its own website, www.m-on-ent.jp/.

== Current Programming ==
=== Video Clips ===
- AniOn! World
- Visualism
- Aa, Itoshi no Kayōkyoku
- K-Pop Hits!
- Saishin Saikyō! Utaeru Hits
- M-On! Hits
- J-Pop Ketteihan! Rekidai Saikyō Million Hits
- Rekidai Karaoke Super Hits
- Anokoro Hits!
  - Anokoro Drama Hits!

=== Music Chart ===
- J-Pop Saikyō Countdown 20
  - J-Pop Saikyō Countdown 50
  - M-On! Countdown International
- M-On! Countdown K
- Kan-On! Countdown 10
- M-On! Karaoke Countdown 20
  - M-On! Karaoke Countdown 50
- Apple Music Countdown 20
- Line Music Countdown 20
- Tsutaya Rental CD Countdown 20
- Ninki Kashi 20 by UtaMap
- YouTube Japan Music Video Countdown 20

=== K-pop ===
- Music Bank
- Show Champion
- SBS Inkigayo

=== Others ===
- legato ~Tabisuru Ongaku Studio~

== See also ==
- Sony Music Entertainment Japan
- MTV Japan - rival of M-On!
