= Pulstar (video game) =

1995 video game

- Developer: Aicom
- Publisher: SNK
- Composers: Harumi Fujita; Yasuaki Fujita
- Platforms: Arcade, Neo Geo AES, Neo Geo CD
- Release: Arcade: JP: August 28, 1995; Neo Geo AES: JP: September 29, 1995; Neo Geo CD: NA/JP: October 27, 1995
- Genre: Scrolling shooter
- Modes: Single-player, multiplayer
- Arcade system: Neo Geo MVS

Pulstar (Note: Japanese: パルスター, Hepburn: Parusutā) is a 1995 horizontally scrolling shooter video game developed by Aicom and published by SNK for the Neo Geo arcade and home platforms. Players control a starship in its mission to eradicate the Solar System of a hostile race of aliens that threaten mankind. Its gameplay has been compared to the R-Type series for its similar premise and mechanics; players must complete each of the game's eight stages by destroying constantly-moving formations of enemies and avoiding their projectiles. There are power-ups that can be collected that provide additional abilities for the player. It runs on the Neo Geo MVS arcade system board.

Pulstar is the first Neo Geo game to incorporate 3D pre-rendered visuals. Its music was composed by Harumi Fujita and Yasuaki Fujita, both of whom previously worked for Capcom on the Ghosts 'n Goblins series. Pulstar has been ported and re-released several times, seeing conversions for systems like the Neo Geo CD and digital storefronts such as the Wii Virtual Console. The game and its re-releases have received mixed reviews from critics, who felt its gameplay and graphics were good but its difficulty was too high and it lacked originality. A sequel named Blazing Star was released in 1998, which aimed to correct the flaws present in the original.

== Gameplay ==
The player facing off against a boss

Pulstar is a horizontally scrolling shooter in the same vein as the R-Type series. The player controls a starship, the Dino246, in its mission to protect the entirety of the Solar System from a hostile race of aliens. There are eight stages total, which become progressively more difficult as the player progresses. They scroll automatically, and the player is given a free range of movement. In these levels, the player must destroy constantly-moving waves of enemies and avoiding their projectiles, as well as dodging moving obstacles. Levels conclude with a boss that must be defeated.

The player's main form of attack is a forward-moving projectile. The player can hold down the button to charge their attack, with its power indicated by a meter at the bottom of the screen; the blue half creates a powerful charge shot, while the red half creates a barrage of rapid blasts. Players can also acquire an auxiliary drone that acts as a shield by protecting them from enemy fire. It can also be used as a battering ram to destroy smaller enemies. The drone can also be destroyed to create a powerful bomb attack that can destroy anything in its radius. Destroying large carrier-like enemies drops a power-up item that grants different abilities. These include capsules that increase the player's speed and smaller ships that follow the player and provide additional firepower.

== Development and release ==
Pulstar was released for arcades on 28 August 1995. It was developed by Aicom and published by SNK. Produced for the Neo Geo AES arcade system, Pulstar was known under the codename of Project Dino during development, and was designed to be technologically impressive for the time period. It is the first Neo Geo game to incorporate pre-rendered graphics, which are 3D models converted into 2D images to create the illusion of a 3D environment. The soundtrack was composed by Harumi Fujita and Yasuaki Fujita, both of whom were previously employed at Capcom and worked on their Ghosts'n Goblins series. Harumi Fujita composed the music for Pulstar under the mindset of its freedom from sound chip limitations, allowing her to create music that corresponded to the game's environment and match her vision.

A version of Pulstar was released for the Neo Geo AES system in September, followed by a home release for the Neo Geo CD in October. In France, the AES version was distributed by Guillemot International. The Neo Geo CD version adds a higher-quality soundtrack and cutscenes between stages. In 2012, Pulstar was digitally re-released for the Japanese Wii Virtual Console service, courtesy of D4 Enterprise. Pulstar is included in the Neo Geo 25th Anniversary Humble Bundle, released in 2015. Hamster Corporation re-released Pulstar for the Xbox One, PlayStation 4, and Nintendo Switch in 2017 under their Arcade Archives series.

== Reception ==
Reception

Review scores
| Publication | Score |
|---|---|
| AllGame | 4.5/5 |
| Consoles + | 91% |
| GameFan | 277/300 |
| GamePro | 16/20 |
| Next Generation | 1/5 |
| Nintendo Life | 7/10 |
| Maximum | 4/5 |
| Neo Geo Freak | 18/20 |

In Japan, Game Machine listed Pulstar on their 1 October 1995 issue as being the seventh most-popular arcade game at the time. Harumi Fujita claims that the game was received positively by SNK and Neo Geo fans.

Pulstar drew a wide range of opinions from critics, many of which drew comparison with the R-Type series. Maximum gave the Neo Geo AES version a rave review, particularly applauding the impressive-looking bosses and the extremely high and intelligently designed challenge. They also regarded the game as a sign that SNK was branching out from one-on-one fighting games. Major Mike gave it a more mixed review in GamePro, describing it as an imperfect and unoriginal shooter which manages to distinguish itself through its high difficulty and rendered graphics. He criticized that objects often blend into the backgrounds, but like Maximum, he particularly noted the visually impressive bosses. A reviewer for Next Generation panned the game, contending that the gameplay mechanics fail to surpass even shooters of the early 1980s. He concluded, "If it weren't for the molasses like pace of the game, then Pulstar could've been another generic shooter. Instead, it's even worse".

In 2014, HobbyConsolas identified Pulstar as one of the twenty best games for the Neo Geo CD. Likewise, Time Extension also listed it as one of the best games for the Neo Geo.

== Legacy ==
A sequel named Blazing Star was released by SNK in 1998. Blazing Star features multiple additions to the core gameplay of its predecessor, such as a wide selection of playable ships and new power-up types. It was developed by Aicom, who had changed their name to Yumekobo during production. The development team noticed the stigma against Pulstar in arcades for its high difficulty, and wanted Blazing Star to have its own identity and improve on the original's flaws. Upon release, Blazing Star received far better reviews for its graphics, gameplay, and difficulty balance, and was described as being part of SNK's efforts in keeping older game genres alive.
