= Metal Slug 2nd Mission =

2000 video game

- Developer: Ukiyotei
- Publisher: SNK
- Composer: Yasuaki Fujita
- Series: Metal Slug
- Platform: Neo Geo Pocket Color
- Release: WW: 2000; NA: May 22, 2000
- Genre: Run and gun
- Mode: single-player

Metal Slug 2nd Mission is a 2000 run and gun video game developed by Ukiyotei and released by SNK for the Neo Geo Pocket Color. It is a direct sequel to 1999's 1st Mission. In 2021, the game was re-released together with 1st Mission, both as part of Metal Slug 1st & 2nd Mission Double Pack on Nintendo Switch and as part of Neo Geo Pocket Color Selection Vol. 1.

== Gameplay ==
Gameplay is similar to the rest of the Metal Slug series, but with noted improvements in graphics and controls from the original Neo Geo Pocket Color game, Metal Slug 1st Mission. Clearing all the missions of the game will unlock Tequila, a rebel soldier who has the ability to use the function of level selecting.

== Reception ==
In 2023, Time Extension identified Metal Slug 2nd Mission as one of the best games for the NGPC.
