= Denshattack! =

- Developer: Undercoders
- Publisher: Fireshine Games
- Composers: Tee Lopes; Andrew One; Sean Bialo (Note: Others composers who worked in the soundtrack are 2 Mello, Ryo Nagamatsu, Shoji Meguro, Richard Jacques, Kohta Takahashi, The Noble Demon, Harumi Fujita, Toni Leys, Daan Demmers, Hiro Harding, Lotus Juice, Ironmouse, Alice Peralta, milkyPRiSM, The DO DO DO'S, Yunosuke, Sumika Inoue, JUNKY58%, Liqid and Emma Rose Williamson)
- Engine: Unreal Engine 5
- Platforms: Nintendo Switch 2; PlayStation 5; Windows; Xbox Series X/S
- Release: 15 July 2026
- Genre: Platformer
- Mode: Single-player

Denshattack! (Note: Japanese: 電車アタック!; portmanteau of "densha" (electric train) and "attack") is a 2026 platform game by Undercoders and published by Fireshine Games. It follows Emi, a food delivery driver who delivers ramen via train in a near-future Japan devastated by climate change. Emi joins other train drivers who compete to perform tricks while racing their trains to their destinations.

Denshattack! was released on 15 July 2026 for Nintendo Switch 2, PlayStation 5, Windows, and Xbox Series X/S. It received mostly positive reviews.

== Gameplay ==
Denshattack! is a 3D platformer. The player controls a train in on-rail levels. While traversing the tracks, players aim to perform as many tricks as possible. Trains can jump, flip to different tracks, and perform tricks typically seen in skateboarding, including ollies and kickflips.

Each level varies, from racing through a course as fast as possible, a score attack, where you chain tricks to earn a high score in limited time, races against rival characters, and boss battles. After completing a level, the player is graded by a rank system for highest score, best completion time, and completing a set of challenges unique to every level, known as "dares".

The player can purchase different trains and decal art using paint cans or gear collectibles found in levels. Each train has unique perks and weaknesses, such doubled trick score, grinding maneuverability, among others. Additionally, by collecting film reels scattered in each level, the player can add sections to Fernando's fanzine.

== Plot ==
The story follows Emi, a train driver in Beppu, who delivers ramen via train in a dystopian Japan. Following the effects of climate change, the remaining population, if they can afford to, live in domed cities controlled by a megacorporation named Miraido. Miraido additionally controls the high-speed VACTRAIN system that runs between the domed cities.

After Emi meets with Fernando, an aspiring photographer, she gets involved in the sport of Denshattack, where drivers compete to perform tricks. Fernando joins Emi on her quest to become the best in the sport. Fernando also authors a zine covering the sport.

As Emi and Fernando travel through Japan, they meet and bond with other gang leaders who are equally skilled Denshattackers, joining them in their adventure to fight back against Miraido's iron hold on the country. After defeating the Yoneda clan, a yakuza dynasty following Miraido, Emi and the group discover that Miraido is powered solely by an AI-driven construct on the Moon, controlled through the company's mascot, a robotic mole named Molty, having spawned the company's tyrannical hold in an effort to control humanity.

After Emi manages to beat the VACTRAIN in a decisive race, Molty refuses to admit defeat, retreating to the Moon, where Emi and the other Denshattackers give chase; she manages to destroy the AI construct, stopping Miraido for good. However, Emi ends up stranded in space, her train totalled as she falls back to Earth. Some time later, Fernando and the other Denshattackers erect a statue in Emi's honor. Emi, now with a prosthetic right arm and one eye, runs a ramen joint, where she and her newfound friends spend time together.

== Development ==
Denshattack! was developed by Undercoders, an independent game studio based in Barcelona, Spain. According to director David Jaumandreu, the idea of Denshattack! was first conceived when he and his team were using a Japanese train toy, thinking about if it could perform tricks like a skateboard. When pitching the game, Jaumandreu described the concept as "Tony Hawk but you're a train". Unreal Engine 5 was used as Undercoders had experience with it.

Denshattack! was first announced on 19 August 2025 at Gamescom during its Opening Night Live. It was featured during an Indie World presentation on 3 March 2026, with an original release date of 17 June announced. It was delayed to 15 July for further refinement. It was a day-one release on Xbox Game Pass and GeForce Now.

== Reception ==
Reception

Aggregate scores
Aggregator	Score
Metacritic	NS2: 87/100; PC: 88/100; PS5: 88/100; XSXS: 84/100
OpenCritic	96% recommended (Note: Based on 140 reviews.)

Review scores
Publication	Score
IGN	9/10
PC Gamer (US)	63/100
Shacknews	9/10

Denshattack! received generally favourable reviews from critics. Review aggregator Metacritic recorded scores in the high 80s across its platforms, while OpenCritic reported that 96% of critics recommended the game.

Critics such as IGN and Shacknews frequently compared the game's trick-based movement and visual style to Tony Hawk's Pro Skater, Jet Set Radio and Crazy Taxi. The Guardian praised the game's unusual premise and its combination of trick-based mechanics with a stylised dystopian version of Japan, highlighting its varied levels, cultural references and boss encounters. Slant Magazine described the game as strongly evocative of the Dreamcast era, praising its unusual concept, visual design and fast-paced arcade structure.

PC Gamer scored the game 63/100, arguing that the train physics lacked a convincing sense of weight and that the game's scoring and movement rules could feel inconsistent. The review also criticised the way some of the game's anti-corporate and environmental themes were integrated into its mission design.

Other reviewers praised the game's soundtrack and presentation. Pitchfork highlighted the soundtrack's mixture of funk, hip-hop, rock and electronic music, as well as contributions from composers associated with Japanese games of the 1990s and 2000s.

=== Awards ===
Year	Award	Category	Result	Ref.
2026	Golden Joystick Awards 2026	Best Indie Game	Nominated	
2026	The Game Awards 2026	Best Independent Game	Pending	
