= Tarot Mystery =

1995 video game

- Cover art
- Developer: Ukiyotei
- Publisher: Visit
- Composer: Yasuaki Fujita
- Platform: Super Famicom
- Release: JP: April 28, 1995
- Genre: Non-game
- Mode: Single-player

Tarot Mystery (タロットミステリー) is a Super Famicom title that revolves around tarot divination and answering questions in Japanese. This video game would become Yasuaki Fujita's final project as a composer for Super Famicom video games.

== Features ==
A tarot reading; already in session.

The title is considered to be a simulation of a tarot reading. The title was not released in North America or Europe. Users ask questions and look at cards. The cards used in the game are from the classic Rider–Waite Tarot, illustrated by Pamela Colman Smith.

Each reading consists of a Celtic cross where 12 cards are picked by the person being read. These cards will tell about the player's past, present, and future via on-screen text. The game automatically reads the person's fortune. Once the cards are dealt, each card deals with different issues in the player's future. They are: current situation, issues, awareness, subconscious, past problems, future, present position, environment, hope, and result.

== Reception ==
Reception

Review score
Publication	Score
Famitsu	6/10, 6/10, 4/10, 4/10

Tarot Mystery was released in Japan for the Super Famicom on April 28, 1995. One reviewer complimented that it made Tarot card reading organization much easier and was free of gimmicky elements while another said that the tarot reading element was quite thorough. Another found it weak as it just went for meetings meant already found in books on the topic.

Three of the reviewers dismissed the zodiac compatibility section as being an afterthought, with one reviewer saying that anyone with a basic grasp of zodiac signs would already know the information.

== See also ==
- House of Tarot – 1991 video game
- Taboo: The Sixth Sense – 1989 video game
