= Taboo: The Sixth Sense =

Tarot card reading simulation

- Developer: Rare
- Publisher: Tradewest
- Designer: Julian Jameson
- Composer: David Wise
- Platform: Nintendo Entertainment System
- Release: NA: May 1989
- Genre: Non-game
- Mode: Single-player

Taboo: The Sixth Sense is a tarot card reading simulation developed by Rare and published by Tradewest for the Nintendo Entertainment System (NES) in 1989.

Taboo gives users a tarot reading where the "dealer" automatically shuffles the cards. It is the only NES game to carry two warnings: that it is for players ages fourteen and older and is also for entertainment purposes only. Taboo was marketed as a party game that multiple adults could enjoy simultaneously.

== Gameplay ==
Upon loading, the game requires input of the player's name, birth date, and gender. The game then asks the user to input a question, and shuffles the cards. The game then generates a tarot reading via the Celtic cross layout. These cards can be normal or reversed. Afterward, the player chooses a state from the United States and is given lottery numbers accordingly. The game uses the whole 78-card tarot deck, which consists of the Minor Arcana and Major Arcana.

The instruction booklet gives a brief history of the origins of the word "Tarot". The booklet also lists the arcana and cards, and goes into further detail of the layout, including what each position on the Celtic cross means. There is no actual game activity to be found apart from repeated readings. The game contains nudity and religious images, which were usually unacceptable under Nintendo of America's content guidelines.

== Reception ==
A review in Computer Entertainer found Taboo: The Sixth Sense to only be mildly interesting for a few rounds of gameplay. They ultimately described it as a novelty, only recommending it for audiences already interested in the occult or tarot reading.

== Legacy ==
An urban legend surrounding Taboo states that the game had accurately predicted the deaths of some of its young players.

== See also ==
- House of Tarot – 1991 video game
- Tarot Mystery – 1995 video game
