= House of Tarot =

1991 video game

- Developer(s): Japan System Supply
- Publisher(s): Sega
- Platform(s): Game Gear
- Release: JP: March 8, 1991
- Genre(s): Non-game
- Mode(s): Single-player

House of Tarot (タロットの館, Tarot no Yakata) is a tarot divination title for the Game Gear where the player gets a tarot reading in Japanese using the Rider–Waite Tarot. The game was published by Sega for a Japan-exclusive release.

== Summary ==
Only one person can use it at a time but the computer-controlled tarot reader (appearing as a fortune teller) can provide unlimited readings for the player and their friends. Players can choose between three characters, two female and one male, to provide the fortune telling.

Unlike most Japanese tarot reading simulations that use the Celtic cross, House of Tarot uses the hexagram method of reading tarot cards.

== See also ==
- Taboo: The Sixth Sense – 1989 video game
- Tarot Mystery – 1995 video game
