= The Little Mermaid (video game) =

1991 video game

- Developer: Capcom (Note: Ported to Game Boy by Great)
- Publisher: Capcom
- Producer: Tokuro Fujiwara
- Composers: Yasuaki Fujita (NES); Hitoshi Sakimoto (GB)
- Series: The Little Mermaid
- Platforms: Nintendo Entertainment System, Game Boy
- Release: JP: July 19, 1991; NA: July 1991
- Genre: Action
- Mode: Single-player

The Little Mermaid is an action video game released in 1991 by Capcom for the NES and Game Boy based on the 1989 Disney film of the same name.

== Gameplay ==
The game begins underwater, where Ariel can shoot bubbles to trap her foes and throw them. She can also dig through sand to find treasure and pick up sea shells to break open treasure chests. Treasure chests contain power-ups to increase her bubbles' power and range. Ariel can collect icons scattered throughout the levels to restore health, gain extra lives, or increase the range/power of her bubbles. There are six stages that Ariel must traverse to find Ursula. The stages are The Coral Sea, Sunken Ship, Sea of Ice, Undersea Volcano, and finally two battles at Ursula's Castle.

== NES and Game Boy differences ==
When a stage begins, Ariel descends from the top of the screen to the recommended starting point in the NES version, but just starts out in the recommended position in the Game Boy version. The featured SFX are different in both versions. The start of the stage's BGM can be heard only once in the NES version; although the whole BGM can be repeated in the Game Boy version. The stage backgrounds were more restricted in the Game Boy version than in the NES version. When the player loses a heart, the heart turns into a heart frame in the NES version, but disappears in the Game Boy version. The key scales of the Boss BGM are different in both versions. The BGM speed in the NES version is much faster than in the Game Boy version.

== Release ==
Both versions of the game released in 1991. In 1997, the Game Boy edition was re-released in North America as part of Nintendo's Player's Choice branding.

== Reception ==
Reception

Review scores
Publication	Score
Electronic Gaming Monthly	27/40
Mega Fun	57%
Nintendo Power	GB: 13.4/20; NES: 15.3/20
Electronic Games	84%
GB Action	68%
N-Force	59%
Play Time	73% (1993); 59% (1994)
VideoGame	7/10

=== Sales ===
The game sold 500,000 copies by December 1991. It was a major hit among female audiences, who accounted for the vast majority of the game's player base.

== See also ==
- List of Disney video games
