= Panic in Nakayoshi World =

1994 video game

- Cover art
- Developer: Tom Create
- Publisher: Bandai
- Composers: Harumi Fujita; Yasuaki Fujita
- Platform: Super Famicom
- Release: JP: November 18, 1994
- Genre: Action
- Modes: Single-player, multiplayer

Panic in Nakayoshi World (パニック イン なかよしワールド) is a 1994 video game that was released exclusively in Japan for the Super Famicom. It features the manga series that ran in the manga magazine Nakayoshi: Sailor Moon, Goldfish Warning!, Chō Kuse ni Narisō, and Kurumi to 7 Ninnokobitotachi.

== Summary ==
This title is about monsters that are attacking the World of Nakayoshi. The monsters are eating up the citizens. The more they eat, the hungrier they get. Four girls must stop the monsters and defeat Daima to save the World of Nakayoshi. The game is an overhead Adventures of Lolo-style puzzle game featuring characters from various Nakayoshi-printed manga. Sailor Moon and Chibi Moon are playable characters. There are also characters from Goldfish Warning!.
