= Harumi Fujita =

Japanese composer (born 1961)

Harumi Fujita 藤田 晴美
- Also known as: Mrs. Tarumi
- Born: 1961 (age 64–65); Tondabayashi, Osaka, Japan
- Genres: Video game music, chiptune
- Occupations: Composer, musician
- Instrument: Keyboards
- Years active: 1984–present
- Label: Brave Wave
- Website: otoyanoblog.ldblog.jp

Harumi Fujita (藤田 晴美, Fujita Harumi; born 1961) is a Japanese composer best known for her work at the video game company Capcom.

== Works ==
Video games
Year	Title	Role(s)
1984	Mad Crasher	Music
1985	Ghosts 'n Goblins	Sound effects
1986	The Speed Rumbler	Music with Tamayo Kawamoto
1987	Bionic Commando	Music
1987	Makai Island	Music
1987	Ide Yosuke Meijin no Jissen Mahjong	Music with Manami Matsumae
1987	Tiger Road	Music with Tamayo Kawamoto
1988	1943 Kai	Music with several others
1989	Final Fight	Music with several others
1989	Strider	Music
1989	Willow	Sound programming
1990	Chip 'n Dale: Rescue Rangers	Music
1990	Gargoyle's Quest	Music with Yoko Shimomura
1990	Mega Man 3	Music with Yasuaki Fujita
1994	Skyblazer	Music
1994	Bishōjo Senshi Sailor Moon S: Kondo wa Puzzle de Oshiokiyo!	Music with Yasuaki Fujita
1994	Panic in Nakayoshi World	Music with Yasuaki Fujita
1995	Tottemo! Lucky Man	Music with Yasuaki Fujita
1995	Todd McFarlane's Spawn: The Video Game	Music
1995	Zenkoku Juudan Ultra Shinri Game	Music
1995	Pulstar	Music
1996	Fuuun Gokuu Ninden	Music
1996	Punky Skunk	Music with Yasuaki Fujita
1997	Tomba!	Music
1997	Rabbit	Music with Atsuyoshi Isemura
1998	Blazing Star	Music with Seisuke Ito
1998	Hellnight	Music with several others
1999	Magical Tetris Challenge	Music; Game Boy Color version
2019	Spidersaurs	Music
2020	Streets of Rage 4	"Estel: Round 1" and "Estel: Round 2"
2022	Windjammers 2	Music with Seiichi Hamada
2024	Tomba! Special Edition	Arrangements
2026	Denshattack!	Guest Composer
