= Vegas Stakes =

1993 video game

- North American box art
- Developer: HAL Laboratory
- Publisher: Nintendo: JP: Imagineer
- Composers: Kimitaka Matsumae (SNES); Manami Matsumae
- Platforms: Super Nintendo Entertainment System, Game Boy
- Release: Super NES: NA: April 10, 1993; EU: 1993; JP: September 10, 1993; Game Boy: NA: December 1995; EU: 1995
- Genre: Casino
- Modes: Single-player, multiplayer

Vegas Stakes, known as Las Vegas Dream in Japan, is a 1993 gambling video game developed by HAL Laboratory and published by Nintendo for the Super Nintendo Entertainment System. It was released in North America in April 1993, in Europe the same year and in Japan by Imagineer in September 1993. A port for the Game Boy was released only in North America in December 1995. The Super NES version supports the Super NES Mouse, while the Game Boy version is compatible with the Super Game Boy, and features borders which use artwork from the Super NES version. It is the sequel to the NES game Vegas Dream.

The game sees the player go to Las Vegas to gamble with $1000. Using that $1000, the player must try to win $10 million at different casinos.

== Gameplay ==
In the Super NES version, the player can choose to play either a single-player or multiplayer game. The multiplayer mode is not included in the Game Boy version. In the single-player game, a computerized friend accompanies the player around various casinos. In the multiplayer game, poker cannot be played since everyone could see everyone else's cards. At the beginning of the single-player game, a car is seen driving to Las Vegas. The various "friends" of the player are introduced as Cliff, Maria, Isabelle and Richard. All are eager to begin gambling. The "friends" are not present in the Game Boy version.

The player is given $1,000. The player's goal is to win $10 million. If the player loses all the money, the game ends, and an image is shown of a man standing in front of the "Welcome To Fabulous Las Vegas" sign, showing his empty pockets.

The game features blackjack, poker, craps, roulette, and slot machines. When the player wins $100,000, the Laurel Palace casino is unlocked. A total of five casinos are featured in the Super NES version, while four are featured in the Game Boy version.

Aside from gambling, the player will also have interactions with the traveling party, and with random casino patrons. The player can make or lose money, depending on the response given to these patrons. In one example, a patron may attempt to pickpocket the player's character by pretending to wipe a spot off the character's shirt. There are no random encounters in multiplayer mode. Several additional patron interaction situations exist in the Game Boy version.

At the end of the Super NES version, the player gets to type in what they plan to do with their winnings. At the end of the game, a couple drive up to a casino with the player's name on it. Also at the end of the Super NES version, the game tells the player what they typed in came true.

== Reception ==
Reception

Review scores
| Publication | Score |
|---|---|
| AllGame | (SNES) 4/5 |
| Computer and Video Games | (SNES) 71/100 |
| Electronic Gaming Monthly | (SNES) 7/10, 8/10, 8/10, 8/10, 7/10 |
| Famitsu | (SNES) 8/10, 7/10, 7/10, 5/10 |
| IGN | (GB) 7.0/10 |
| Nintendo Power | (SNES) 7.2/10 (GB) 6.3/10 |
| Dengeki Super Famicom | (SNES) 7/10, 7/10, 7/10, 7/10 |
| Electronic Games | (SNES) 79% |
| Hippon Super! | (SNES) 7/10 |
| Marukatsu Super Famicom | (SNES) 7/10, 7/10, 8/10, 6/10 |
| ProGames | (SNES) 3/5 |
| The Super Famicom | (SNES) 69/100 |
| Super Pro | (SNES) 60/100 |

Vegas Stakes on the Super Nintendo Entertainment System garnered generally favorable reception from critics. Readers of Japanese publication Super Famicom Magazine voted to give the game a 19.2 out of 30 score in a public poll. Nintendo Power praised its realistic gambling games, four-player mode, and compatibility with the Super NES Mouse, but criticized the lack of variety in the games and live interactions with other opponents during multiplayer. A writer for Computer and Video Games commended the audiovisual presentation, but felt that its gameplay became dull after the first half hour.

Electronic Gaming Monthly's five reviewers stated that "Nintendo gives casino life a great video game feel". They noted that the game's recurring incidents at the casino added humor and variety. ProGames's Chu-Chi commented that the game was "very satisfying" for fans of the genre, highlighting the unique characteristics and dialogues of each character. He also gave positive remarks to the visuals, sound, challenge and overall fun factor. AllGame's Scott Alan Marriott regarded Vegas Stakes as "an excellent example of how to do a casino game on the console format", noting the inclusion of surrounding in-game characters, adventure element and diverse game selection. However, Marriott expressed disappointment with the game ending once the main goal is met.

The Game Boy version carried similar response as the original Super NES release. Nintendo Power's six editors praised it for being a solid recreation of the Super NES version, as well as its accessible controls and adventure element, but was criticized for featuring "only four games of chance". GamePro's brief review found it fun, giving positive remarks to its variety of games, "crisp and clean" visuals, and "cheesy" music for being fitting. IGN's Monica Wilbur commended its suitable graphical presentation, audio and replayability, writing "if playing classic games of chance with virtually no risk attached sounds like a good way to pass the time, Vegas Stakes offers a solid gameplay experience."

=== Retrospective coverage ===
Retrospective reviews for the title have been more mixed since its Virtual Console re-release. Nintendo Life's Marcel van Duyn recommended it for gambling fans, noting that the random character events and optional advise from the player's companion added variety and extra interaction to the game, while commending the detailed backgrounds but criticized the music for being "annoying". Eurogamer's Dan Whitehead found its multiplayer component more interesting than the main campaign, but he ultimately expressed that "if you peek over the fence at Xbox Live Arcade, and take a look at fully-featured online gambling games like Texas Hold 'em, you can't help feeling that games like this just highlight the shortcomings of the Virtual Console while adding little of value." IGN's Lucas M. Thomas commended the overall presentation, visuals, audio, gameplay and lasting appeal, but stated that more variety and different versions for some of the included casino games would have been welcomed. GameSpot's Frank Provo wrote that "When it originally came out for the Super Nintendo Entertainment System in 1993, this collection of five parlor classics was one of just a few gambling compilations available for home consoles. However, now that Nintendo has made Vegas Stakes available once again on the Wii's Virtual Console service, there are a near-infinite number of gambling collections out there for a multitude of platforms, and most of them provide a wider selection of casino staples than the ones included here."
