= Metal Slug 1st Mission =

1999 video game

- Developer(s): Ukiyotei
- Publisher(s): SNK
- Composer(s): Yasuaki Fujita
- Series: Metal Slug
- Platform(s): Neo Geo Pocket Color, Nintendo Switch, Microsoft Windows
- Release: WW: 1999; EU: 2000
- Genre(s): Run and gun
- Mode(s): single-player

Metal Slug 1st Mission is a run and gun video game developed by Ukiyotei and published by SNK. It was released in Japan in 1999 for the Neo Geo Pocket Color and in Europe in 2000.

In 2021, the game was re-released together with its sequel, Metal Slug 2nd Mission, both as part of Metal Slug 1st & 2nd Mission Double Pack on Nintendo Switch and as part of Neo Geo Pocket Color Selection Vol. 1 for Nintendo Switch and PC Steam.

== Gameplay ==
Metal Slug 1st Mission plays similarly to other Metal Slug games, but has toned down graphics for the Neo Geo Pocket Color hardware. Notably, grenades are thrown by pressing the option button to switch, then fire. This was changed in the sequel. When the game is completed once, another character becomes playable. There are five different difficulty levels: kids, easy, normal, hard, and very hard.
