= Hellnight =

1998 survival horror video game

- Developer: Dennou Eizou Seisakusho
- Publishers: JP: Atlus; EU: Konami
- Composers: Rick Hilman; Ryohei Tomoeda; Kinso; Minehiko Tanaka; Naoki Wato; Harumi Fujita; Masataka Kitaura
- Platform: PlayStation
- Release: JP: June 11, 1998; EU: December 30, 1999
- Genre: Survival horror
- Mode: Single-player

Hellnight, known as Dark Messiah (ダークメサイア, Dākumesaia) in Japan, is a first-person survival horror video game developed by Dennou Eizou Seisakusho and published by Atlus Co. in collaboration with Konami in 1998.

== Plot ==
Tokyo at the end of the millennium is a megapolis with a huge system of subway tunnels and sewers. The game opens with the protagonist fleeing from a group of notorious cult members through the city streets and escaping on a late-night subway train. As he contemplates why they want to kidnap him specifically, the scene changes to a secluded research station. There, a symbiotic lifeform breaks free of its confines and attacks a research scientist. He soon mutates into a zombie-like creature and makes a bloody exit towards the subway system.

Time passes and the protagonist's train is derailed by the creature roaming the tracks, as if purposely being drawn to that point. The only survivors of the crash are the protagonist and a schoolgirl named Naomi Sugiura. They both flee the train wreck when the creature starts systematically killing everyone left alive on board. They are soon confronted by a black-ops squad (secretly sent to destroy the creature from the lab), but the creature wipes the team out within seconds.

The protagonist and Naomi travel deeper into the sewers and find a place called "The Mesh", an underground area full of self-sufficient citizens who have given up their identities above ground to live a more peaceful life. Their lives are about to be disrupted by the pursuing creature, who has now evolved into a faster and more exoskeletal-like form. They attempt to find a way to the surface.

Along the way, the player can meet and recruit several people as companions: Naomi Sugiura is a 17-year-old schoolgirl who ended up in the sewers after being chased by a group of occultists. Kyoji Kamiya, a 28-year-old serial killer who carries a gun stolen from his first victim, who was a cop; Leroy Ivanoff is a 30-year-old veteran Russian soldier that follows the creature deeper into "The Mesh" in a quest for vengeance for destroying his team; Rene Lorraine is a French journalist intent on exposing the secret of the cult that are kidnapping people around Tokyo.

== Gameplay ==
The game uses a first-person perspective, very similar to first-person shooter games, only without any means of combat. Throughout the game, players must travel through different areas of The Mesh and beyond, and must solve puzzles to progress to the surface. The player encounters only one type of enemy, and that is the mutating monster called The Hybrid. The only possible way for players to survive is to run away. Any close contact with the enemy will result in the deaths of their companion (and finally themselves). Once the companions are attacked, they are killed off permanently.

Throughout the journey the player meets other characters that may replace their lost friends. Only one character may tag along at a time, each having a different ability. Although the game does not allow any physical force towards the enemy, players are still able to 'stun' them with the help of their companions; the number of possible stuns differs with each character. Players start with Naomi as the default. To replace her, Naomi has to die and the player must meet up with the new member. Having someone in their group negates the choice of another character to join; the character ultimately continues their journey without the player, with their fates being revealed towards the end.

There is no combat, as the primary "weapon" players possess is the ability to run fast. After a period of time the characters will get exhausted, and the screen shakes and later flashes red to warn the player that they have reached the characters' limits to run. Therefore, a strategic plan to move about the areas in the game must be considered. Most of the characters apart from Naomi are able to attack the monster and help players temporarily. Naomi helps by telling the players the position of an approaching monster, either by dialogue or by a symbol on the map.

The main objective of the characters is to reach the surface. Not everyone in the Mesh is friendly; some serve as antagonists to the player's goals, while others can help. The player must be able to interact, take note of clues and find alternative paths to avoid losing a member in the group or other negative phenomena.

Having different companion or the lack of thereof result in different story sequences and endings. For example, one of the latest stages will have different content for every character since it reveals the story of their past.

=== Presentation ===
The bulk of the game consists of 3D mazelike maps that all have their own look and feel. Some are set in one level, while others have several layers. Aside from the maps, the only other 3D representation is that of the monster. To some older gamers, Hellnight can be seen as a modern 3D Monster Maze. Other characters, including the player's companion, appear as static 2D renders, though they have been modeled in 3D. They are never physically present on the map until the player activates them through movement, a completion of a task or pressing the 'talk' button. It has never been made clear if this is intentional to scare the player with a 'pop-up' cast (the creature 'pops up' albeit animated) or if it is due to budget and time restraints.

When a player enters a room, rather than the exit to another maze, the game's stylistic presentation changes from 3D to 2D. The pre-rendered representations of each room is played out as a basic point and click. The player must click on certain areas that are already designated hotspots; eliminating any need for pixel hunting. By pressing left or right, these points of interest are cycled through accordingly. It is in these pre-rendered spaces that the majority of puzzles and conversations take place (some puzzles towards the end of the game take place in the 3D world). The monster never attacks the player in these rooms (except for one instance), so they can be seen as a quick safe haven before venturing out into the tunnels again.

The game's atmosphere relies on alternating between the puzzles and solutions in certain rooms (the 2D renders) and the dangerous legwork between each point of safety (the 3D world where the creature roams).

== Development and release ==
The game was first mentioned in December 1997. The game was shown off in the March 1998 Tokyo Game Show. The game was released in Japan on June 11, 1998. It was then released to most of Europe with the exception of the United Kingdom. The game, however, was never released in the United States.

== Reception ==
Reception

Review scores
Publication	Score
Consoles +	55 /100
Famitsu	28 /40
Hyper	55 /100
Joypad	6 /10
PlayStation Official Magazine – UK	6 /10
Video Games (DE)	7 /100
Gamers' Republic	A-
Maniac	19 /100

The game received polarized reviews with some giving it praise, while others being highly critical of it. German magazine Maniac gave the game a score of 19/100. German magazine Video Games gave it just 7%. French reviewers also gave mixed reviews. Consoles + gave it a 55 out of 100 score, and Joypad gave it 6/10. Japanese reviewers were more positive, with Famitsu giving it 28/40 score.

Tim Coleman of Hyper also gave it a 55 out of 100 saying that those who wished to have a game with action would be disappointed.

Gamers' Republic, however, praised the game saying "Dark Messiah accomplishes what it sets out to do—deliver a suspenseful experience", adding "I had a blast".

In 2013, GameSpot writer Jon Leo suggested that the game should be resurrected on the PlayStation 4.
