= Ukiyotei =

Japanese video game developer

Ukiyotei Company, Ltd.
- Native name: 有限会社 浮世亭
- Romanized name: Yūgengaisha Ukiyo-tei
- Type: Private
- Industry: Video games
- Founded: 15 March 1991; 35 years ago
- Founder: Kenshi Naruse
- Defunct: 2002
- Headquarters: Yodogawa-ku, Osaka, Japan
- Key people: Kenshi Naruse (representative director)
- Website: www5.plala.or.jp/ukiyotei/

Ukiyotei Company, Ltd. (Japanese: 有限会社 浮世亭, Hepburn: Yūgengaisha Ukiyo-tei) was a Japanese video game developer based in Yodogawa-ku. The company was founded on 15 March 1991 by Kenshi Naruse, who served as its representative director. The company is believed to have shut down in 2002 and most of the staff (including Naruse) went on to join SNK.

The company's first game they developed is Hook for the Super Famicom, which received critical acclaim from gaming press, like Famitsu, became a hit, and had a development deal with Sony Music Entertainment Japan.

The success led the company to develop a second game with the same engine, Skyblazer, also for Sony Music Entertainment Japan, and received critical acclaim. The company made another game under a contract with Sony, called Todd McFarlane's Spawn: The Video Game, which was sold to Acclaim Entertainment due to company restructuring, and it received mediocre reviews.

After producing mediocre Japanese-only games, the company shifted its attention to work for SNK, often producing PlayStation and Neo Geo Pocket ports. The company also developed the game concept of Cooly Skunk for Bullet-Proof Software, but shifted to PlayStation before release.

Two of its games for the PlayStation got Western releases, those being Samurai Showdown III: Blades of Blood and Punky Skunk. The company also developed the critically acclaimed portable Metal Slug games for the Neo Geo Pocket Color. The company also developed Bust-a-Move Pocket for the Neo Geo Pocket Color, which also had critical acclaim.

== Games developed ==
Year	Title
1992	Hook
1994	Skyblazer
1995	Tarot Mystery
1995	The Shinri Game 3
1995	Gekitou Burning Pro Wrestling
1995	Todd McFarlane's Spawn: The Video Game
1995	Zengoku Juudan Ultra Shinri Game
1996	Samurai Shodown III: Blades of Blood
1996	Punky Skunk
1997	Metal Slug
1998	The King of Fighters '97
1999	Metal Slug 1st Mission
1999	Bust-A-Move Pocket
1999	Puzzle Bobble 2 (Neo Geo)
2000	Metal Slug 2nd Mission
