= Bust-a-Move Pocket =

1999 video game

- North American box art
- Developer: Ukiyotei
- Publisher: SNK
- Series: Puzzle Bobble
- Platform: Neo Geo Pocket Color
- Release: JP: March 26, 1999; NA: April 30, 1999; EU: 1999
- Genre: Puzzle
- Modes: Single-player, multiplayer

Bust-A-Move Pocket, also called Puzzle Bobble Mini, is a Neo Geo Pocket Color version of the Puzzle Bobble (Bust-A-Move) series of puzzle video games. It was released on the Neo Geo Pocket Color by SNK in 1999.

The format is similar to Puzzle Bobble 2 for the PlayStation. The game's Puzzle mode includes a feature that saves initials of those who have completed the level in the fastest time. The game contains a survivor mode where the player has to burst the oncoming bubbles, making sure they don't reach the bottom line which spells the end of the game. Also present is a vs CPU mode, where the player can compete against a selection of eight characters.

== Reception ==
Reception

Review score
Publication	Score
GameSpot	6.6/10

Jeff Gerstmann of GameSpot said the game has well rendered colorful graphics, catchy music and overall a good portable puzzle game.

Time Extension placed the game on their list of the "Best Neo Geo Pocket Color Games", calling it one of the best puzzle games on the system.
