= Blazing Star =

1998 video game

- Arcade flyer
- Developer: Yumekobo
- Publisher: SNK
- Director: Michio Sato
- Producer: Takaya Ida
- Programmer: Minoru Yoshida
- Artist: Tomonori Nagakubo
- Composer: Harumi Fujita
- Platforms: Arcade, Neo Geo AES
- Release: Arcade: JP: January 19, 1998; Neo Geo AES: JP: February 26, 1998
- Genre: Scrolling shooter
- Modes: Single-player, multiplayer
- Arcade system: Neo Geo MVS

Blazing Star is a 1998 horizontally scrolling shooter video game developed by Yumekobo and published by SNK for the Neo Geo arcade and home platforms. It is a follow-up to Pulstar (1995), and features side-scrolling action similar to its predecessor and different ships with varying characteristics. It was made less challenging than its predecessor, and the graphic quality was improved upon.

The game was released to mixed reviews. It was commended for its graphics and boss design, and for keeping the Neo Geo shooter scene alive. It has received greater recognition in retrospective reviews when re-released on smartphones and home consoles through the ACA Neo Geo series. Critics continued to praise the boss battles and graphics, but criticized the uneven stage design.

== Gameplay ==
The player uses a charge shot against a boss.

Blazing Star is a horizontally scrolling shooter similar to its predecessor Pulstar (1995) and the classic shooter R-Type (1987). The story revolves around cyborgs that, remembering their humanity, team up to destroy artificial intelligence systems developing the cybernetic armies they were once a part of.

The player can choose from playing as one of these cyborgs, each piloting a ship equipped with different shot types, power, and speed. Tapping the fire button will unleash a standard shot, or it can be tapped rapidly for a different shot type, or held down for a charge attack. Upon releasing the fire button during a charge, it will unleash a powerful focused shot which can also be dispersed to cover a large area with smaller bullets. The effect and range of these attacks varies depending on the player's ship.

Power-ups are littered across each stage that boost the power of the ship's weaponry. There are also other items that will increase the player's score and count towards their ranking at the end of each stage. Some of these are only revealed if the player eliminates specific waves of enemies. Some of the later stages introduce more stage hazards like narrow passages. Each stage ends with a boss fight which the player must be completed in the allotted time to get bonus points added to their score. If not completed under the time limit, the player is forced to continue to the next stage without collecting additional points.

== Development ==
Blazing Star was the first game developed by Yumekobo, a company formerly known as Aicom but rebranded to mark their new direction of working closely with SNK. Initial discussions began with the concept for a follow-up to their shooter Pulstar, however they wanted their new game to maintain a degree of independence from the original. With significant changes made to the gameplay style and setting, the team treated their new game as a gaiden and did not want to use Pulstar in the title. Yumekobo's president at the time opposed this, wanting Pulstar in the title for business reasons. At some point the game was titled Pulstar Blast. The publisher SNK entered the dispute, saying they did not want Yumekobo's new shooter to be associated to Pulstar in the west because it received poor reception there due to its high difficulty. The team settled on the title Blazing Star for its western release, (Note: The team was unaware at the time of the plant known by the same name.) chosen among others including Zero Hour and The Zenith. Not wanting to keep the names different between regions, Yumekobo's president decided to make Blazing Star the title in all regions.

The team had trouble designing the attack patterns and enemy placements to establish the right level of difficulty. Interesting combat patterns made the game more difficult, but the game was boring otherwise. The director of Pulstar thought the original game was too difficult and wanted the new shooter to have a charge shot for an easier challenge. Although much of the game changed through development, the charge shot was one of the early concepts that was kept along with the goal to create impressive scenery. Yumekobo staff believed the game's best selling point was its detailed graphics. The artists had to overcome challenges creating the textures, animation, and reducing the sprites to 16 colors each due to Neo Geo hardware limitations. The system's sprite limit restricted the number of bullets they could place on-screen. There was still some sprite flickering in the final game due to crossing this threshold.

The character Leefa has a kogal personality and was modeled after Yuko Asahina from Tokimeki Memorial at the request of the game designers. JB was modeled after the actor Jean Reno, and Asayuki was based on a character for a previous game the character designer worked on that was never released. Unique endings were planned for each character but were later cut, the details of which were divulged in an issue of Neo Geo Freak.

== Release ==
Blazing Star was released for the Neo Geo MVS arcade system in Japan on January 19, 1998, and the Neo Geo AES home system on February 26, 1998. A Neo Geo CD release was planned but not released.

The game was re-released on iOS and Android in July 2012, and on the Wii via the Virtual Console in Japan on 21 August of that year. The smartphone versions include multiplayer support via Bluetooth and a practice mode that lets the player start from any stage they have cleared. Hamster Corporation re-released the game as part of their ACA Neo Geo series for the PlayStation 4, Xbox One, Nintendo Switch, Windows, Android and iOS. As with all games released under the ACA Neo Geo brand, the game includes Hamster's additional scoring modes, screen filter options, and difficulty settings. Blazing Star is also included in SNK's Neo Geo Mini dedicated console.

A port developed by DotEmu for Microsoft Windows, OS X, Linux and asm.js was released by SNK Playmore as part of the Humble NEOGEO 25th Anniversary Bundle on December 15, 2015. It was also released on GOG.com on May 30, 2017.

== Reception ==
Reception

Review scores
Publication	Score
Nintendo Life	9/10 (Switch)
Nintendo World Report	8/10 (Switch)
Pocket Gamer	9/10 (iOS/Android)
Player One	83% (AC); 81% (NG)
Super Game Power	5/5 (Neo Geo)
TouchArcade	4/5 (iOS/Android)
Video Games (DE)	72% (Neo Geo)

Critics commended Blazing Star as a testament to SNK's devotion to the Neo Geo hardware and keeping classic genres such as shoot 'em ups alive. Edge wrote that side-scrolling shooters were rare to find, but the game should satisfy fans of the genre. They praised the colorful backgrounds and 3D special effects. Video Games agreed that the graphics were nice, but felt some of the backgrounds were pale and it ultimately did not offer "The Ultimate in Neo Geo graphics", as was advertised on the game's packaging. Next Level argued that the game took better advantage of the Neo Geo hardware than Pulstar with its improved background and lighting effects. Journalists found the game similar to its predecessor, but Video Games in particular thought Pulstar was the better game. They gave Blazing Star a score of 72% and felt it was too short, not challenging enough, and lacking in sophisticated level design. They did however like the bosses, as did Next Level and Edge who both appreciated the game for carrying on the large boss trend from Pulstar. Edge ultimately felt that the "frenetic, old-school gameplay...will keep the Neo Geo's devotees happy." In 2014, HobbyConsolas identified it as one of the twenty best games for the Neo Geo AES.

The iOS and Android ports of Blazing Star were well-received. TouchArcade commended the strategic gameplay, impressive 2D backgrounds, and felt it featured "some of the most intricate shooter gameplay you can find in the vast pool of shmups available on the App Store." Their biggest criticisms were the touch screen controls which they felt were sluggish. Pocket Gamer agreed about the controls, writing that their finger would get in the way of action occasionally. They still thought the game was addictive and "the equivalent of the machine in the corner that the hardened veterans congregate around, dropping in coin after coin as they inch their way up the leaderboards."

Reviewing the Arcade Archives release, Nintendo Life called it a "perfect port", noting that it even retained the frame rate slowdown when the screen is filled with sprites. Their biggest complaints were the game's aged pre-rendered graphics and the sharp difficulty increase in the latter stages, but they felt these were minor issues. They felt Hamster Corporation's Hi-Score and Caravan modes were perfect complements to Blazing Star. Nintendo World Report felt that it had an uneven level design, wishing the earlier levels had more stage hazards. They did however appreciate the game for maintaining a degree of simplicity without sacrificing gameplay depth, and called it "one of the more accessible and fun shoot-em-ups out there".

== Legacy ==
Retro Gamer and Harcore Gaming 101 wrote that the game is sometimes remembered for its poorly-translated English text. Some articles, including one by linguist Ben Zimmer, have cited the game's game over message, "You fail it", as inspiring the popular interjection "Fail".
