= Magical Tetris Challenge =

1998 video game

- Arcade flyer
- Developer: Capcom
- Publishers: Capcom: EU: Sony Computer Entertainment (PS); EU: Activision (N64, GBC)
- Director: Hidemaro Fujibayashi
- Designer: Hidemaro Fujibayashi
- Composers: Masato Kouda (Consoles); Harumi Fujita (GBC)
- Series: Tetris
- Platforms: Arcade, Nintendo 64, PlayStation, Game Boy Color
- Release: Arcade: JP: November 1998; Nintendo 64: JP: November 20, 1998; NA: January 14, 1999; EU: September 1999; PlayStation: JP: March 18, 1999; EU: 1999; Game Boy Color: JP: November 12, 1999; NA: February 17, 2000; EU: March 24, 2000
- Genre: Puzzle
- Modes: Single-player, multiplayer

Magical Tetris Challenge (Note: Known in Japan as Magical Tetris Challenge Featuring Mickey (Japanese: マジカルテトリスチャレンジ featuring ミッキー, Hepburn: Majikaru Tetorisu Charenji Fīcharingu Mikkī)) is a 1998 puzzle video game developed and published by Capcom for arcades. It was ported to the Nintendo 64, Game Boy Color and PlayStation. It is a version of Tetris (Russian: Тетрис (Note: Pronounced [ˈtʲetrʲɪs] or [ˈtetrʲɪs])) featuring Disney characters.

It is one of the few Nintendo 64 games to be entirely in 2D, in addition to being Capcom's first game for the console. The Japanese arcade cabinet and cover art was done by Kenichi Sudo, while the North American cover art was done by Robert Griggs.

== Console version ==
This version is played as one of four characters: Mickey Mouse, Minnie Mouse, Donald Duck, or Goofy, Three game modes are available: Magical Tetris, Updown Tetris, and an Endless mode. Magical and Updown Tetris can be played under Story Mode or in Versus Multiplayer.

=== Magical Tetris ===
In Magical Tetris, the player is pitted against an opponent, which is either the A.I. in Story or Endless Modes or another player in Versus Mode. Players control the standard seven Tetris pieces, race to make lines (and consecutive line clears, called combos), and attack the other player. The attacked player receives a set of "magical" pieces, which range from pentomino pieces to square blocks and even very large (up to 5x5-block sized) pieces. Players can also counter one another by making multiple lines to send the pieces back to their opponent. Because of the pentomino pieces, it is possible for a player to clear five lines at once (called a Pentris) using a 5-block straight piece.

=== Updown and Classic Tetris ===
Updown Tetris can be considered as an extension of Classic Tetris; Updown Tetris is available in Story and Versus Modes, whereas Classic Tetris takes up what would be the Endless mode. The magical pieces are absent from this mode, and attacking the other player sends a number of lines to the other player; the lines rise from the bottom as filled lines with a one-block gap in a predetermined column and could be used as further lines to attack the opponent.

=== Common elements ===
During Magical and Updown Tetris, making lines and combos fills a special meter alongside the board called the Magic Meter, with the fill line initially set to the fourth row; when a player's meter is filled, all of the blocks drop, filling any gaps, and one predetermined column drops out; all the blocks above the meter are wiped clean, the meter resets, and play continues. The meter's fill level may or may not rise depending on the difficulty. If it does rise, it moves up two lines which makes it harder to fill and less effective. The meter can be reduced by two lines (to a minimum of two) by scoring an "All Clear" of completely clearing the board of pieces. In this way, the player is left with filled columns and one empty column, allowing either a Tetris or Pentris to be made easily using a straight piece.

Pieces spawn from the top one row at a time; column grids and a "ghost" piece are provided to aid the players in positioning and dropping pieces. Play stops when a piece entering the grid has to overlap a piece in the board. Players are scored according to the number of combos and counters they make in addition to any other points earned.

=== Story Mode ===
Players can choose to be one of four characters (Mickey, Donald, Goofy, or Minnie) to play out the story; each character has a different storyline. It can be played under Magical or Updown Tetris. The last three stages pit the player's character against a Weasel and the Big Bad Wolf before facing the game's main antagonist, Pete.

== Game Boy Color ==
The Game Boy Color version is vastly different from the console versions. Magical and Updown Tetris are present in the game, plus new gameplay styles were added. All four characters are playable, alongside Pete, who is unlocked in Quest Mode, which replaces the console version's Story Mode. Due to limitations of the Game Boy's screen, the player can't see the adversary's gameplay and it is represented with a flashing laser on the left side of the screen, which height represents how tall the adversary's tetris pieces are stacked, and like it, reaching the top of the screen calls for a game over. This version also has the special meter, but only for some Tetris variants.

The Game Boy Color version uses chiptune renditions of music tracks from the console version, and new tracks. Unlike the console versions, each track is used as the theme song for a Tetris variant rather than for a Disney character.

=== Quest Mode ===
This mode's main goal consists of a coin rally where the player has the goal of collecting coins that can be gathered by winning a match of Tetris; these are in the possession of certain characters or buildings, and each character has its unique way of playing Tetris. Once the player has all the coins that are needed to win the rally, he must get to the rally station before another player comes in with the coins collected. After beating Quest Mode four times, Pete can be unlocked as a playable character for all game modes. Tetris variants can also be unlocked to be played in single player mode by beating Quest Mode and waiting until the credits end, Updown and Standard Tetris are the only variants available in the start when playing single player.

=== Signal Tetris ===
In Signal Tetris, clearing a line will cause the floor blocks below the clearing standard seven Tetris pieces will change color. The objective is to get the floor blocks to match the colors of the line of blocks under the floor. As a result, the player has to be careful about the positioning Tetrominos when clearing lines. Easy and Normal use just red and blue for the floor blocks, but the Expert difficulty adds the color yellow.

=== Towering Tetris ===
Towering Tetris starts you with a pile of random garbage blocks that raises throughout the game. The objective is clear the garbage blocks faster than they can raise until you reach the bottom of the pile and clear the keyhole block on the bottom line. In addition to the standard pieces, this mode also features a special 1*2 Piece that shoots an endless supply of 1*1 blocks when you press A or B and then disappears when it locks into place.

=== Target Tetris ===
In this puzzle mode, you are given a preset sequence of Tetrominos with which you must clear all of the Target Blocks (represented by Acorns, Lightning Bolts, or Flames depending on mode) on the screen. Each difficulty level has its own set of puzzles, with over a hundred total puzzles.

== Reception ==
Reception

Aggregate score
Aggregator	Score		
Aggregator	GBC	N64	PS
GameRankings	85%	72%	N/A

Review scores
Publication	Score		
Publication	GBC	N64	PS
CNET Gamecenter	N/A	7/10	N/A
Consoles +	N/A	(US) 81% (EU) 65%	N/A
Electronic Gaming Monthly	N/A	7.5/10, 7.5/10, 7/10, 8/10	N/A
Famitsu	26/40	N/A	27/40
Game Informer	N/A	8/10	N/A
GameSpot	9.4/10	5.9/10	N/A
IGN	10/10	7.8/10	N/A
Jeuxvideo.com	N/A	N/A	15/20
N64 Magazine	N/A	51%	N/A
Nintendo Power	7.7/10	7.8/10	N/A

The Game Boy Color version received "favorable" reviews, and the Nintendo 64 version received "average" reviews, according to the review aggregation website GameRankings. In Japan, Famitsu gave the PlayStation version a score of 27 out of 40, and later gave the GBC version a score of 26 out of 40. Nintendo Power gave the Japanese Nintendo 64 version a favorable review over a month before the game was released in North America, and GameSpot gave it a mixed review, about two months prior to its North American release date. GamePro said of the Nintendo 64 version, "For older Disney and Tetris addicts, Magical Tetris Challenge is a blessing in disguise. Ironically, the merciless computer player will frustrate younger kids. Curious gamers, however, will be satisfied with a quick weekend rental." (Note: GamePro gave the Nintendo 64 version 3.5/5 for graphics, 3/5 for sound, 5/5 for control, and 4/5 for fun factor.)
