= Tashiro Masashi no Princess ga Ippai =

1989 video game

- Cover art of Famicom release
- Developers: Soft Vision (MSX2); Tose (Famicom)
- Publishers: MSX2: JP: HAL Laboratory; Family Computer: JP: Epic/Sony Records
- Directors: Ryotaro Hasegawa; Yukio Nagasaki
- Producers: Tetsuji Yamamoto; Masashi Tashiro
- Designer: Atsushi Kodama
- Composer: Daisuke Inoue
- Platforms: MSX2; Family Computer
- Release: MSX2: JP: May 29, 1989; Family Computer: JP: October 27, 1989
- Genre: 2D action platformer
- Mode: Single-player

Tashiro Masashi no Princess ga Ippai (田代まさしのプリンセスがいっぱい; Masashi Tashiro Has So Many Princesses) is a Japanese video game for the MSX2 home computer system and Family Computer featuring former comedian Masashi Tashiro released in 1989.

== Summary ==
The story is about the hero Masashi Tashiro who has to rescue the four princesses in distress. One happy ending and four unhappy endings were used in the game; becoming one of the first video games to have multiple endings. The game was not very successful, but it started appearing frequently and getting high prices on online auction sites like Yahoo! after 2000, when Masashi Tashiro was arrested and convicted several times in connection with voyeurism and drug abuse.
