= Extra Innings (video game) =

1991 video game

- North American cover art
- Developer: Sting
- Publishers: JP: Sony Music Entertainment Japan; NA: Sony Imagesoft
- Composer: Tetsuya Furumoto
- Platform: Super NES
- Release: JP: August 9, 1991; NA: March 1992
- Genre: Sports (baseball)
- Modes: Single-player, multiplayer

Extra Innings (Note: Japanese: 白熱プロ野球 ガンバリーグ, Hepburn: Hakunetsu Puro Yakyū Ganba Rīgu; Hakunetsu Pro Yakyuu Ganba League lit. Incandescent Professional Baseball Gamba League) is a 1991 baseball video game released for the Super NES. The game features 12 fictional teams composed of their own fictional players, drawn in an anime style. Players can also create two custom teams, the players of which can have their names and ratings edited any number of times. For the most part, the game adhered to realistic rules of baseball; it omitted some more complex strategies such as the double switch.

Extra Innings's controls were unlike many of the era, featuring pitches with vertical break, diving and sliding catches that could be assisted by the AI, and independent runner control (selecting the destination base with the D-pad and Y would advance the runner; the origin base on the D-pad and B would make an individual runner retreat).

This could be exploited in this and subsequent Japanese versions of the game with runners on first and third in single player. The AI will attempt to put out any runner advancing toward a base. With practice, the player can alternate between advancing and retreating both runners until the computer could not keep up with both, producing cheap runs.

Like most baseball video and computer games, either one or two players can join in for simultaneous play.

== Gameplay modes ==
Extra Innings features four different types of play within the game. Players can choose from these four options:

1P VS. Computer Game (Hitori de Battle) - player chooses a team (or creates and uses a Custom team), and plays a single game against the computer.

2P VS. Battle (Futari de Battle) - both players choose a team (or creates and uses one or both Custom teams), and play a single game.

All-Star Game (All-Star Battle) - a two-player option where players choose between the two league divisions: the "ALL A" League (ALL "P" League) and the "ALL N" League ("ALL C" League). Players can pick and choose team members from their respective league teams and face-off in an All-Star division league game.

Pennant Race - single player option where player chooses a home team, and five computer teams, to play for the pennant. Player can choose 10, 20, 30,... up to 130 games for the pennant season. Best overall season win average clinches the pennant.

== Teams ==
Players can choose between the 12 regular teams, and the two custom teams during game play.

Teams are as listed in their league divisions:

All "A" League (All "P" League)	All "N" League (All "C" League)
Surfers (Links)	Bees (Gibsons)
Valiants (Blazers)	Triplets (Carrots)
Petros (Buckles)	Rains (Whistles)
Metallics (Fines)	Condors (Drafts)
Stocks (Orphans)	Bunkers (Swingers)
Winds (Harpoons)	Motors (Timers)

=== Custom teams ===
Players can create two custom teams within the game. When creating a custom team, players can name all the members of the team. Players also have the ability to rearrange player ratings within the team. These stats control various team aspects such as hitting, pitching, speed, etc. Each of the two custom teams is allotted a certain number of points that can be allotted as the player chooses across the team's entire roster.

Custom teams can be played in all the gameplay areas except All-Star mode. In All-Star mode, only the regular pre-made teams can be used.

== Reviews ==
Famitsu gave the game a score of 30/40.
