= Vegas Dream =

1988 video game

- North American cover art
- Developer(s): HAL Laboratory
- Publisher(s): JP: Epic/Sony Records; NA: HAL America Inc.
- Director(s): Ryotaro Hasegawa; Yukio Nagasaki
- Programmer(s): Naoki Gotoh
- Composer(s): Kuni Kawachi
- Platform(s): NES
- Release: JP: September 30, 1988; NA: April 1990
- Genre(s): Casino
- Mode(s): Single-player; Multiplayer

Vegas Dream, released in Japan as Viva! Las Vegas (ビバ ラスベガス) is a gambling video game developed by HAL Laboratory for the Nintendo Entertainment System. A sequel, Vegas Stakes, was released for the Super Nintendo Entertainment System in 1993.

== Gameplay ==
Vegas Dream begins with graphics showing one of the players arriving at Las Vegas by airplane. Featuring a backdrop of old downtown Las Vegas, players choose which of the two game modes to play: "Vegas Dream" (storyline version) or "One Spot" (strictly gaming, no storyline).

Players then start with a bankroll of $700 at the fictional HAL Palace Hotel (or the Epic Palace in the Japanese version), to spend on four games: Keno, Blackjack, Roulette or Slot machines. Between rounds of play at the normal casino games, there are randomly occurring social interactions with various characters, such as business people, other patrons, or casino employees (in the "Vegas Dream" version of the game only). These interactions (and the player's responses to them) have different possible results: sometimes the unidentified man is a pickpocket; other times he is just down on his luck and will reward the player's kindness down the road. The results of interactions are reported on a local Las Vegas news station; music with a cheery tone plays for positive happenings, such as the player receiving cash, with more somber music playing for thefts, injuries, etc.

Vegas Dream also allows the player to date and marry as many members of the opposite sex as desired; men marry a woman named Ms. Sophie while women marry a man named Mr. James. Marriage results in increased cash flow for the player, or a loss of funds from theft in the event that the married person is crooked.

There is a password save feature built into the game. The passwords are twenty-six characters long and consist of letters, numbers and symbols. The Japanese version, with gameplay identical to the North American version, uses slightly stronger language in its script and mentions cigarettes. The text within the Japanese version is also entirely in English.

=== Endings ===
It is possible to win the game by earning over $10 million, at which point the player is seen reclining by a pool with their household staff (assuming the player has moved into a mansion and has hired servants), and then taking a limousine to a show with their partner.

Should the player lose all their money, the staff at the HAL Palace give the player one final pull on a slot machine in a last-ditch effort to win some more money. If the player wins, they get to resume their gaming; if not, the player is bid goodbye, and a screen appears showing persons heading towards a plane, ready to depart Las Vegas, ending the game.

== Music ==
At this time, Kazuo Sawa was writing music to some of Hal Laboratory's video games such as Tokoro-san no Mamoru mo Semeru mo. Instead, Hal hired professional keyboardist Kuni Kawachi to compose the game's soundtrack while Sawa worked on sound design and provided the sound driver. Vegas Dream is Kuni Kawachi's only video game to date.
