= Todd McFarlane's Spawn: The Video Game =

1995 video game

- North American version box art
- Developer: Ukiyotei
- Publishers: Sony Electronic Publishing; Acclaim Entertainment
- Designers: Mike Giam; Kenshi Naruse
- Programmer: Norihiro Tokeshi
- Artist: Michiyo Komura
- Writer: Mike Giam
- Composer: Harumi Fujita
- Platform: Super Nintendo Entertainment System
- Release: NA: October 1995; EU: November 1995
- Genres: Action, beat 'em up
- Mode: Single-player

Todd McFarlane's Spawn: The Video Game is a 1995 video game based on the Spawn comic book character. Developed by Ukiyotei and published by Acclaim Entertainment and Sony Electronic Publishing for the Super Nintendo Entertainment System in late 1995, it features Al Simmons, Spawn, trying to save the lives of thirteen children in a beat 'em up type of video game. The game received mixed reviews by critics; the graphics were praised while the unoriginality of the game was criticized.

When the video game was released, the Image Comics Spawn character was popular in the United States,^{[a]} and this is the first video game based on the Spawn comic books.

== Gameplay ==
Todd McFarlane's Spawn: The Video Game is an action-style side-scrolling beat 'em up video game with some platforming elements.^{[b]} The player controls the main character, named Al Simmons, who can walk, run, duck and jump throughout the seventeen levels of the game. In combat, Simmons can punch and kick in order to attack enemies. In addition to the melee attacks available, the main character has access to an arsenal of special powers that requires the input of a special button combination on the controller. Using a special power will drain his Necroplasm which is limited to a timer which starts at a value of 9:9:9:9 with different special powers using varying amounts of energy which decrement the timer. Fully depleting this timer means that Spawn's soul is lost to hell forever, and results in a Game Over. Several of Simmons' special powers will fire projectiles, but the main character can also teleport as well as use a special power that completely refills his life force meter. Also, the main character's health can be replenished by collecting a special item dropped by one of the end-of-level bosses when defeated. The game is over when the life meter is fully depleted, or the in-game timer runs out.

An unlimited continues system allows the player to keep playing the same level even if all lives are lost. Also, a password feature allows the player to stop playing a level and continue later. However, the amount of life left in the life force meter will not replenish by the use of a password.

== Story ==
The protagonist of the game is Al Simmons, an undead being. Simmons used to work as a secret agent for the U.S. government, but was betrayed and murdered by one of his own. Longing after his wife, a deal was made with the Lord of Darkness named Malebolgia to make Simmons return from the dead and thus become Malebolgia's Spawn. In the deal, Simmons would get access to infinite powers. Unfortunately, the powers, though infinite in force, were limited in supply. If Spawn's powers are used to their full extent, his soul will belong to Malebolgia and he will do Malebolgia's bidding for all time to come.

In the present time, a renegade crusader named The Mad One has kidnapped thirteen innocent children, including Simmons's stepdaughter, and locked their souls in a magical orb called Orb of Purity. The Mad One's long-term goal is to make use of the Orb of Purity to destroy Malebolgia once and for all, and he has already entered the area where Malebolgia resides. Al Simmons must now stop The Mad One in order to save his stepdaughter, the other children and himself.

== Development ==
Todd McFarlane's Spawn: The Video Game is based on Image Comics' Spawn comic book character. Ukiyotei developed the game on behalf of Sony, who published the game in the United States and Europe. Sony Imagesoft purchased the rights to the game and planned to publish the game by itself. Mike Giam elaborated the story and concept of the game. Together with Kenshi Narushe, the pair designed the core elements of the game. Comic book-style cutscenes were designed by C. Bradford Gorby and displayed between levels in order to move the story forward. The music in the game was composed by Harumi Fujita.

In mid 1995, Sony decided to sell the publishing rights to the game to Acclaim Entertainment as Sony is preparing to move to the PlayStation amid a company resturcturing at Sony Electronic Publishing. The company then tested the game for previews.

== Reception ==
Reception

Review scores
Publication	Score
AllGame	3.5/5
Electronic Gaming Monthly	6.5/10, 6.5/10, 6/10, 5.5/10
Game Informer	7/10, 6/10
Game Players	55%
GameFan	70/100, 79/100, 80/100
GamesMaster	50/100
Hyper	63/100
Next Generation	1/5
Official Nintendo Magazine	76/100
Super Play	56%
Total!	(UK) 71/100 (DE) 3+
Nintendo Magazine System	73/100
VideoGames	5/10

Todd McFarlane's Spawn: The Video Game received mixed reviews. The graphics, animations and music were praised by critics. Several reviewers thought that the gameplay neither was innovative nor varying enough. Also, some reviewers considered the special moves too difficult to perform. On the other hand, the special moves were also seen as one of the highlights of the game. In addition, GamePro liked that the game was faithful to the comics. Others, however, found the game unsatisfying even in this regard; Andrew Baran of Electronic Gaming Monthly said it "doesn't really have the feel of the comic", and all but one of the magazine's four-person review crew judged the game to be mediocre, citing a good variety of special moves but slow character movement and an excessive number of cheap hits, especially when fighting Anti-Spawn. A reviewer for Next Generation was even more condemning: "Suffering from problems with just about everything, a lack of speed, poor play control, and lousy graphics, this completely generic attempt at a videogame is less enjoyable than a skin rash." Still, most reviewers recommended the game for fans of the comic book series.

== Notes ==
"Since Spawn is one of the hottest comic book properties available ..."; "Spawn is the hottest-selling comic-book series since the X-Men"; "Hierzulande ist er eher unbekannt, in den Vereinigten Staaten hat "Spawn" eine große Fangemeinde."
