= Shigeo Maruyama =

Japanese businessman (born 1941)

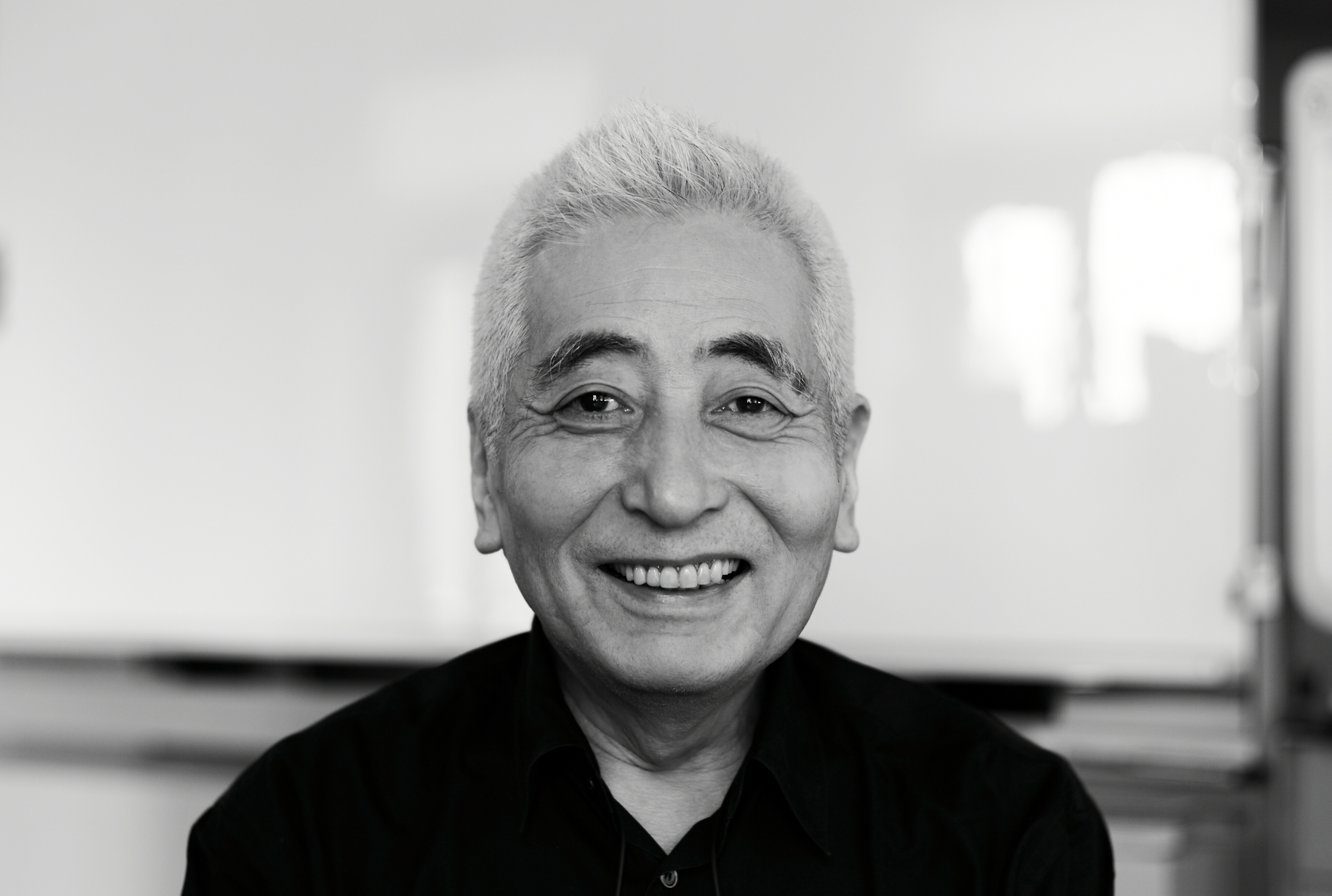
Shigeo Maruyama

Shigeo Maruyama (丸山 茂雄) (born August 8, 1941 in Tokyo, Japan) is a Japanese businessman. He is best known for being the founder of Epic/Sony Records, former chairman of Sony Computer Entertainment and former CEO of Sony Music Entertainment. He is known for discovering artists such as Motoharu Sano and Tetsuya Komuro. He is Chisato Maruyama's eldest son.
