= Hook (video game) =

Video game based on the eponymous 1991 film

- Super NES cover art
- Developers: Ukiyotei (SNES); Core Design (Sega CD, Genesis); Spidersoft (Game Gear)
- Publisher: Sony Imagesoft
- Director: Jeremy Smith (Game Gear)
- Producers: Allan Becker; Steve Marsden (Game Gear)
- Composers: Tetsuya Furumoto; Katsunori Ujiie (SNES, Genesis, Sega CD); Takafumi Fujisawa (SNES); Matt Furniss (Game Gear)
- Platforms: Super NES; Genesis; Sega CD; Game Gear
- Release: 1992-93: SNES; NA: October 1992; EU: November 26, 1993 Genesis; NA: 1993; EU: November 19, 1993 Sega CD; NA/EU: 1993 Game Gear; NA: 1993; EU: November 12, 1993
- Genre: Platform

Hook
- Developer: Irem
- Publisher: Irem
- Platform: Arcade
- Release: WW: 1992
- Genre: Beat 'em up

Hook
- Developers: Painting by Numbers (NES, Game Boy)
- Publisher: Sony Imagesoft
- Composers: Jonathan Dunn (C64, Game Boy); Matthew Cannon (NES)
- Platforms: NES; Game Boy; Commodore 64
- Release: WW: 1992
- Genre: Side-scrolling video game

Hook
- Developer: Ocean Software
- Publisher: Ocean Software
- Composer: Jonathan Dunn
- Platform: Amiga; Atari ST; DOS
- Release: WW: 1992; EU: 1993; (Amiga re-release)
- Genre: Point-and-click adventure

There have been several video games based on the 1991 film Hook. A side-scrolling platform game for the Nintendo Entertainment System and Game Boy was released in the United States in April 1992. Subsequent side-scrolling platform games were released for the Commodore 64 and Super NES and an arcade beat ‘em up by Irem later in 1992, followed by versions for the Sega CD, Genesis, and handheld Game Gear console in 1993.

A point-and-click graphic adventure, developed and published by Ocean Software, was released for Amiga, Atari ST, and MS-DOS in 1992.

== Gameplay ==
In each version of the game, the player plays as Peter Pan, who must go through Neverland to rescue his children after they are kidnapped by Captain Hook. Each version of the game is set in Neverland, and concludes with a sword fight between Peter Pan and Captain Hook.

=== Arcade version ===
The arcade version is a side-scrolling beat 'em up that supports up to four players. The player chooses to play as either Peter Pan or one of the Lost Boys: Ace, Pockets, Rufio, or Thudbutt. The game is played across six stages. It was handled by Irem, who is known for their other arcade games, like Kung Fu Master (known as Spartan-X in Japan) and the R-Type series.

=== PC version ===
The version for PC is a graphic adventure point-and-click game. As Peter Pan, the player must solve puzzles and problems to progress through the game. Each large problem cannot be solved without first solving several smaller problems first. Puzzles are solved by talking to characters and finding useful objects. Five icons are featured at the bottom of the screen, each one representing a different action that the player can take: "look at", "talk to", "pick up", "use", and "give". An inventory window, showing all the items the player has accumulated, is also located at the bottom of the screen. Also located at the bottom of the screen are two separate images, one depicting Captain Hook while the other shows Peter Pan. The characters' facial expressions change depending on the player's progress. Tinker Bell accompanies Peter Pan to provide hints and clues. The game has three main sections: Pirate Town, an encounter that Peter Pan has with the Lost Boys, and the confrontation with Hook.

=== Sega and Super NES versions ===
These versions are side-scrolling platform games. The Sega CD version utilizes the identical gameplay of the Genesis and Super NES versions. The Game Gear version has eight levels, while the Genesis, Sega CD, and Super NES versions all have 11 levels. Each version features various locations that include caves, forests, lagoons, and snowy mountains. Throughout the game, the player must defend against Hook's pirate henchmen, as well as spiders, snakes, and skeletons. Peter Pan's primary weapon is a dagger. After completing the first level, the player receives the golden sword as a weapon, capable of shooting balls of energy. If the player is attacked, Peter Pan drops the sword and must use the dagger, while the golden sword can sometimes be retrieved in the following level.

The player's health meter is measured as leaves. The player begins with two leaves, and loses one each time an enemy attacks. The player can collect additional leaves throughout the game to increase the health meter, for a maximum total of four leaves. Fruits that are scattered throughout each level can be collected to refill the player's health meter. After collecting pixie dust, Peter Pan has the ability to fly for short periods of time, until the Fly Meter becomes empty. Tinker Bell appears throughout the game to refill the Fly Meter. The game does not include a password feature.

The film's musical score was adapted for use in the Sega CD version, which also includes digitized graphical sequences from the film, and voice acting. Additionally, the Sega CD version includes a computer-generated scan of Captain Hook's ship, which is featured during the game's introduction.

=== Commodore 64/NES/Game Boy version ===
This version is a side-scrolling platform action game, in which Peter Pan can fly and swim. Enemies include Hook's henchmen, as well as ghosts, zombies, and monkeys that throw bananas at the player. A map of each level is provided to the player. The player must collect items in order to proceed to the next level. Instructions are provided to the player before each level, and Tinker Bell appears so she can provide the player with hints. Tinker Bell also has the ability to revive the player if all health is lost. The game includes a two-player option. The NES and Game Boy versions are nearly identical to each other. The NES version has 16 levels, while the Game Boy version has 27 levels.

== Development and release ==
The Super Nintendo version was in early development in January 1992. Ocean Software began working on the graphic adventure version in January 1992. For the graphic adventure game, the creative team read the film's script and were required to have the gameplay closely follow the film's story. It was Ocean Software's first graphic adventure game. The NES and Game Boy versions, developed by Painting by Numbers, were the first versions to be released; they were published by Sony Imagesoft, and were released in April 1992. The Amiga version had been published in Europe by July 1992.

The Super NES version, developed by Ukiyotei and published by Sony Imagesoft, had been released in the United States by September 1992. Ocean Software developed and published the Commodore 64 version, also released in 1992. By March 1993, Irem had released its arcade version of the game in the United States. The Sega CD and Genesis versions were developed by Core Design, while the Game Gear version was developed by Spidersoft; each version was published by Sony Imagesoft. The Sega CD version includes voice acting, but not from the film's actors, as licensing their voices was deemed too costly. In the United States, the Sega CD version was released in March or April 1993, while the Genesis and Game Gear versions were released in late 1993. In Europe, the Mega Drive version was released in November 1993. By December 1993, the Amiga version had been re-released in Europe by publisher Hit Squad.

== Reception ==
Reception

Review scores
Publication	Score				
Publication	Game Boy	NES	PC	Sega Genesis	SNES
AllGame				3/5	
Mean Machines					72%
Mean Machines Sega				69%	
Nintendo Power	11.2/20	11.2/20			13.8/20
Super Play					72%
Total!	88%	84%			
Commodore Force			73%		
Commodore Format			85% 55% (1993)		
Electronic Games					88%
N-Force		73%			81%

Nintendo Power considered the NES and Game Boy versions to be nearly identical, and criticized them for being "an average running and jumping game with a pretty weak character and sluggish play control. The movie is good, but the game falls short." N-Force criticized the music of the NES version and wrote that the film "doesn't translate very well to console. You occasionally get one that does the platform adventure game extremely well–but Hook just isn't one of them." Steve Jarratt of Total! praised the graphics of the NES version but wrote that the in-game music "is a bit annoying after a while". Andy Dyer of Total! praised the Game Boy version for its music and graphics, and wrote that it was "much faster to play" than the NES version and "therefore more fun", while noting that it was also harder than the NES version. GamePro praised the music of the NES version, but wrote that Peter Pan's "limited range of sword swinging motion and lethargic forward movement make gameplay a bit of a drag." GamePro reviewed the Game Boy version and wrote that it had an "enticing musical repertoire and superbly detailed graphics, although they are tiny and a bit eye straining. Overall, this is a fun Game Boy cart".

Marc Camron of Electronic Games praised the graphics of the Super NES version and wrote, "What makes this game different from most games based on movie licenses is that this game is good!" N-Force praised the graphics and music of the Super NES version, but criticized the standard gameplay. Nintendo Power praised the Super NES version for its graphics and considered it better than the NES and Game Boy versions, but noted the occasionally slow response times for the controls. Jason Brookes of Super Play praised the colorful graphics of the Super NES version, but criticized its short length and slow-moving gameplay.

Mean Machines Sega praised the graphics, music and "well planned" levels of the Sega CD version, and awarded it a 72% rating, but criticized the slow controls. The magazine concluded that the game was "a real waste" of the Sega CD's "enormous potential," stating, "Visually and aurally Hook is tremendous, but underneath there is a very average game bursting to get out." Camron, who gave the Sega CD version an 89% rating, praised the music, graphics, and gameplay, but criticized the quality of featured footage from the film and the limited amount of voice acting. Sega Visions, reviewing the Sega CD version, noted that the "outstanding quality of the music will give your gaming a lift."

Sega Visions wrote, "With the exception of the sound and music, the Genesis version of the Sega CD hit […] is every bit as good as the original." Sega Visions wrote about the Game Gear version: "The translation to Game Gear is superb. From great color to terrific game play and bouncy tunes, Hook Game Gear is a blast." GamePro wrote that the Genesis version does not have as good graphics or high quality sound as the preceding versions for the Super NES and Sega CD, but "it's just as fun to play." Mean Machines Sega praised the graphics and music of the Genesis version, but criticized its difficulty, while calling it, "Sort of reasonably playable, in a way." The magazine concluded, "Another mediocre film becomes a mediocre platform game. Hook isn't terrible, but it's not loaded with fun either." In a retrospective review of the Genesis version, Brett Alan Weiss of AllGame noted that Peter Pan "moves along at a dreadfully slow pace, even when jumping or running in wide open spaces. He can jump high and far and can even fly and swim, but the slow motion routine gets old almost as soon at begins." He praised the graphics despite occasional glitches, but wished that the game contained hidden items or areas. He concluded, "Hook is a flawed, but fun platformer that will keep your interest at least until you beat it."

James Leach of Commodore Format reviewed the Commodore 64 version. Leach praised the sound effects and music, the large levels, and the various gameplay styles, but criticized its main character for looking "a bit pasty." Leach also believed that the game was too easy, and criticized it for "Tons of boring loading" times. Commodore Format reviewed the game again in 1993, criticizing the game's repetitive gameplay and concluding, "It's got probably the most irritating multiload system in the history of gaming, making you wait while it loads a subscreen, then wait again while it loads the main level." Commodore Force praised the graphics but wrote, "Hook's multiload is possibly one of the worst I've come across", further stating, "It's a shame (and also ironic) that Hook's incredible amount of detail is also its downfall: all those admirable extras extend loading time." The magazine concluded, "It's a fun game to play, with lots to do and see, but can you stand the waiting? Basically, if you hate multiloads, avoid Hook like the plague."

Electronic Games nominated the Super NES version for its 1993 Electronic Gaming Awards, in the category of Best Electronic Game Graphics. The magazine stated, "Some of the finest game graphics can be found in Hook", writing that the game had a "unified visual appearance like no other game on the market."

=== PC version ===
Reviews (Amiga/Atari ST version)

Review scores
Publication	Score
Amiga Action	72% 80% (1993)
Amiga Format	48% 5/10 (1993)
Amiga Power	84% 80% (1993)
Amiga User International	87%
ST Format	79%
Amiga Mania	78%
CU Amiga	64% 56% (1993)
The One	82% 74% (1995)

Amiga Action praised the graphics and music, but criticized the gameplay. Tony Jones of Amiga Mania considered the game to be better than the film, and noted that it had a "much clearer storyline." Rik Haynes of CU Amiga wrote, "Sadly, despite aspiring to the heights achieved by Monkey Island, Hook has none of the finesse of rival productions from Virgin Games or Delphine."

Maff Evans of Amiga Format called the game a "tedious graphic adventure" and criticized its story and characters, writing that they "don't seem to evolve at all, leaving everything seeming rather flat." Evans also criticized the control system for being "far too limited and unwieldy," and wrote, "Occasionally nice graphics, but a bit too cartoon-like for this style of game." Andy Hutchinson of ST Format criticized the Atari ST version, calling it "terribly reminiscent of Monkey Island. However, where that game is hysterical and innovative, Hook is slightly amusing and derivative." Hutchinson concluded, "A polished but ultimately unsatisfying game. Buy Hook only if you're a massive fan of graphic adventures or have pleasant childhood memories of Peter Pan. Then expect to be disappointed."

Amiga User International praised the music and graphics, but wrote, "The only disappointments are that it is too short by far, and the puzzles are not really very tough. The game is pretty linear and will not let you stray very far off track." Mark Ramshaw of Amiga Power praised the music and sound effects, but criticized the game's puzzle aspect, calling it "occasionally a little predictable, sometimes a bit on the obtuse side, and just a tad too linear." The One praised the music and graphics, but criticized the short length.

Several publications reviewed the game again in December 1993, after it was re-released by Hit Squad. Cam Winstanley of Amiga Power praised the graphics but criticized the difficulty of the puzzles. Paul Roundell of Amiga Action wrote, "The graphics are colourful, but average, and the interface and interaction, while workable, are certainly no breakthrough, and as always in games of this kind, the humour is dire." CU Amiga praised the music and graphics, but criticized it for occasionally illogical puzzles, as well as confusing text responses given to the player out of order as the result of poor coding. Amiga Format criticized the game's repetitive character interactions.

In 1995, Matt Broughton of The One Amiga reviewed the game and wrote that it "offers enough locations and graphical treats to keep most people happy. The control system breaks no new ground, but why fix something that ain't broke?"

Entertainment Weekly gave the game a B− and wrote that "Peter Pan tries to rediscover his inner child by hacking his way through the usual assortment of bad guys. One plus: gorgeous green-and-gold backgrounds that are truer to real life than the movie's overstuffed sets."
