= Skyblazer =

1994 video game

- North American box art
- Developer: Ukiyotei
- Publishers: NA/EU: Sony Imagesoft; JP: Epic/Sony Records
- Producer: Hiroshi Gotō
- Designer: Kenshi Naruse
- Programmers: Norihiro Tokeshi; Tadakatsu Makiuchi
- Artists: Michiyo Komura; Midori Nasu; Sadaki Matsumoto
- Composer: Harumi Fujita
- Platform: Super Nintendo Entertainment System
- Release: NA: January 1994; JP: 18 February 1994; EU: 25 March 1994
- Genre: Platform
- Mode: Single-player

Skyblazer (Note: Also known as Karuraou (Japanese: 迦楼羅王(カルラオウ), Hepburn: Karuraō; lit. "King Garuda") in Japan.) is a platform video game published by Sony Imagesoft, released in early 1994 for the Super Nintendo Entertainment System. It involves Sky, the Skyblazer hero (Garuda in the Japanese version) searching for Ashura (Asura in the Japanese version), the Lord of War, who had kidnapped the sorceress Ariana (Vishnu in the Japanese version).

== Gameplay ==
Gameplay screenshot.

There are a total of 17 levels with a few more stops on the map where the elder (Brahma in the Japanese version) gives passwords to the player and ten bosses including the final boss, Raglan (Ravana in the Japanese version). Four of those must be fought twice, since they reappear immediately before Ashura, who appears before Raglan. An overhead map allows for movement between levels, including back to ones already completed, and its slight non-linearity allows the player to skip some levels (at the cost of the magic spells and other powerups obtainable in them).

Most of the levels are side-scrolling, but there are some levels involving flight, either automatically scrolling or in Mode 7, where the player can grab crystals towards extra lives but will exit the level upon touching a spike and falling. Also, some levels expand on the usual platform structure by including waterways whose paths can be varied with switches, and there are areas with rotating towers. Two of the bosses also use extensive Mode 7, expanding and rotating around the screen or coming in the form of rotating walls.

There are eight secondary attacks available beyond the basic punch and kick, but unlike those they require magic power. Magic powerups, signified by flasks of red liquid in either small or large sizes, can replenish the power needed to use these while flasks of green fluid restore health. There are gems of both small and large sizes; a large gem counts the same as 10 small ones, and obtaining 100 gems will give a player an extra life. There are also outright 1-ups.

== Reception ==
Reception

Review scores
Publication	Score
Computer and Video Games	86/100
Game Informer	7.75/10
Game Players	80%
Hyper	82%
Official Nintendo Magazine	82/100
Super Play	78%
Total!	(UK) 92% (DE) 2-
Nintendo Game Zone	47/100
Nintendo Magazine System	76/100
SNES Force	88/100
Super Action	79%
Super Control	90%
Super Gamer	85/100

Skyblazer received generally favorable reception from critics. GamePro's Manny LaMancha lauded it as "a great mix of side-scrolling action, puzzle solving, special powers, and tactics." He praised the game's high challenge, mythological setting, simple controls, and inventive use of Mode 7. Electronic Gaming Monthly's Mike Weigand commended the game's graphics and controls.
