= Blaster Master (disambiguation) =

Blaster Master is a video game released by Sunsoft for the Nintendo Entertainment System.

Blaster Master may also refer to:

- Blaster Master, a series of video games by Sunsoft
  - Blaster Master Jr., also known as Blaster Master Boy in North America, 1991 Game Boy video game
  - Blaster Master 2, sequel to Blaster Master, released on the Sega Genesis
  - Blaster Master: Enemy Below, 2000 Game Boy Color video game, fourth release in the Blaster Master series
  - Blaster Master: Blasting Again, 2000 PlayStation game
  - Blaster Master: Overdrive, 2010 WiiWare game
  - Blaster Master Zero, 2017 video game
  - Blaster Master Zero 2 2019 video game
  - Blaster Master Zero 3 2021 video game

== See also ==
- Master Blaster (disambiguation)
- Master Blasters
- Raster Blaster
- Gaster Blaster
