= Blaster Master (video game) =

1988 video game

- North American box art
- Developer: Sunsoft (Note: Developed under the shell corporation Tokai Engineering)
- Publisher: Sunsoft
- Directors: Hiroaki Higashiya; Koichi Kitazumi
- Designer: Kenji Sada
- Composer: Naoki Kodaka
- Series: Blaster Master
- Platform: Nintendo Entertainment System
- Release: JP: June 17, 1988; NA: November 1988; PAL: April 25, 1991
- Genres: Platform, run and gun, Metroidvania
- Mode: Single-player

Blaster Master, known in Japan as Super Planetary War Chronicle: Metafight (Note: Japanese: 超惑星戦記メタファイト, Hepburn: Chō Wakusei Senki Metafight) or simply Metafight, is a 1988 platform/run and gun video game developed and published by Sunsoft for the Nintendo Entertainment System. The game is the first in the Blaster Master series, and spawned two spin-off games as well as two sequels. The game follows Jason as he discovers a tank known as Sophia the 3rd, which he uses to battle radioactive mutants. The player controls Jason and the tank through eight levels of gameplay in order to find the whereabouts of Jason's pet frog Fred, and to defeat the mutants and their leader, the Plutonium Boss.

Blaster Master was praised for its smooth play control, level designs, detailed and clean graphics, and music, but was criticized for its high difficulty level and lack of passwords or save points. The game was novelized by Peter Lerangis as part of the Worlds of Power series by Scholastic Books.

== Plot ==
In the Japanese version of the game, the plot is only explained in the manual. The game takes place on the planet Sophia the 3rd, located near the center of the Epsilon Galaxy, in which an advanced civilization flourished. In the year 2052 of the space age calendar, the Invem Dark Star Army, led by the universe's most feared tyrant Goez, invade and conquer Sophia the 3rd. The Science Academy of NORA, a satellite orbiting near Sophia the 3rd that somehow managed to avoid the invasion, built a weapon, an all-purpose tank called the "Metal Attacker", in a last-ditch effort to defeat Goez's army. A young soldier named Kane Gardner is chosen as the pilot of this weapon. The game's opening sequence shows Metal Attacker being dropped into the battlefield.

The plot of the adapted Western release (Blaster Master) is shown at the beginning in a cinematic slideshow as ominous music plays in the background. The game starts with a person named Jason who has a pet frog named Fred who, one day, decides to leap out of his fish bowl, out the door, and down a hole in the back yard. Fred then touches a radioactive chest, and he grows to an enormous size; Fred and the chest then fall deeper into the hole in the earth. Jason chases Fred down the hole, which leads to a large cavern. While most sources say that Jason chased Fred down the hole, the game's instruction manual says that Jason fell into the hole while trying to reach for Fred. There, he finds an armored tank named SOPHIA THE 3RD – a vehicle designed to battle radioactive mutants that live inside the Earth. Jason mounts SOPHIA to find the whereabouts of Fred and to destroy the mutants and their leader – the Plutonium Boss.

== Gameplay ==
Blaster Master has two modes of gameplay that depend on the situation and location of the player: the first mode is where the player controls Jason; either on foot or piloting a tank named SOPHIA in a two–dimensional platform mode; the second mode is where the player controls Jason on foot in a top-down perspective. Gameplay in the top-down perspective consists of a series of labyrinths in which players navigate and defeat enemies along the way. Gameplay is non-linear, and players must return to earlier levels in order to advance to later levels in the game. The objective is to complete all eight levels and destroy the mutants and their bosses with various weaponry such as guns, grenades, and special weapons.

The vehicle jumps over chasms in the 2D platforming mode.

While Jason is inside SOPHIA in the 2D platforming mode, the player can attack the mutants with the main cannon (which can shoot up, left, and right determined by the orientation of the tank) or with one of three special weapons. Special weapons have limited ammunition which must be collected from exploring the game. They include the following: homing missiles that, when fired, shoot 1 missile at each enemy on screen up to 4; "Thunder Break", which fires a high-damage lightning bolt downward; and "Multi Warhead Missiles", which simultaneously fires a set of three missiles at enemies in front of and diagonally up and down. Players select their special weapon and monitor the amounts of each special weapon left by accessing the Menu Screen by pressing the Start button.

The player switches between the 2D platforming mode and the top-down perspective by leaving the tank and entering small doorways located throughout the game. While in the top-down perspective, players can move Jason in any direction and destroy mutants with a gun or with hand grenades. In this mode, players upgrade the gun by collecting gun capsules, but the gun degrades by one point if Jason receives damage from mutants or hazardous objects. Here players obtain additional vehicle functions by destroying bosses; these functions include weapon upgrades as well as abilities to swim freely underwater, drive on walls and ceilings, and hover above the ground. The game has a glitch – colloquially known as the "grenade glitch" – to easily defeat four of the game's underbosses. To exploit this glitch, the player throws a grenade at the boss, and while the grenade is exploding and causing damage on the boss, the player pauses the game. While the remainder of the action on the screen freezes, the grenade remains active, continuing to damage the boss. After fifteen seconds the player unpauses the game to find that the boss is destroyed.

Jason and SOPHIA have separate power meters, and they decrease whenever they sustain damage by an enemy or any other hazardous object or whenever Jason falls from a high place. Players can replenish these power meters by collecting power capsules that appear throughout the game. Also, the player can replenish Jason's health to full at any time by re-entering SOPHIA. The player loses a life if either power meter runs out, and the game ends when all lives are lost. Players get four continues that allow them to restart the game at the same level in which they have lost all their lives. A "hover gauge" monitors the amount of thrust remaining in SOPHIA and is located on the left side of the screen above the power meter; additional thrust can be obtained by collecting hover capsules.

== Development ==
The player fights enemies and collects power-ups in the game's top-down portions.

Blaster Master was created by Kenji Sada (credited as Senta), who also led the development of The Wing of Madoola and wrote its main code. The game was made by a part-time development team of about five people, which included team leader and main programmer Sada, sub-programmer Kenji Kajita (Kanz), character designer Hiroyuki Kagoya (Fanky), art designer Yoshiaki Iwata (PGM F-1), and sound programmer Naohisa Morota (Marumo). Iwata, who would later direct the reimagining Blaster Master: Overdrive, did the game's opening sequence and designed the map, overall layout, and bosses. In a 2010 interview, Iwata said: "We were trying to make the best action game to date, with all that entails. With SOPHIA (the game's vehicle), we wanted to bring to life a sense of action that incorporated all 360° of the environment in a way that players hadn't really experienced up to that point. Along with that, we wanted large, expansive maps so that we could support that vision".

The game's art design came from Iwata, who was able to translate his original ideas directly into the game as far as the NES's graphical capabilities could be taken at that time. He said: "The goal was really to try to pull off the best graphics on the NES to date. Simple graphics were more or less the standard on the NES at the time but I had this firm belief that it was possible to do something better, something prettier. I feel like we pulled it off and were able to show people what could be done [on the NES]. It left an impression around the office, and from what I've heard [the visuals] influenced the work of other games that were later made by other NES developers as well". The game's music and sound were designed in cooperation between Sunsoft's staff and an outside composer, Naoki Kodaka, who had previously worked on scores for many of the company's other games. Iwata credited him for giving the company a good reputation for video game music in the late 1980s and lamented that "none of those people are working together anymore since they've all separated from Sunsoft [over the years]".

Sada created the system of alternating between the 2D platforming and top-down modes. During the game's planning, he came up with the idea that SOPHIA would eventually be able to go anywhere in the game, including navigating on the ceilings and walls. He created the top-down portions to allow Jason to shoot in all directions and to enable the team to "express large bosses that really had an impact". He did not want to design the gameplay in a linear progression; instead he drew inspiration from and was influenced by Nintendo's Metroid to create a game that allowed players to freely move between levels. According to Iwata: "We wanted the player to experience the feeling of excitement that comes from discovering something after endeavoring through a difficult search, which is why we composed a map that allowed the player to move freely between different areas. We really put a great deal of thought into that element of the game design and, I mean this in the best possible way, but we wanted the player to have to struggle".

== Release ==
Chô Wakusei Senki Metafight (also simply called Metafight) was released for the Famicom in Japan on June 17, 1988. While Sunsoft's development team, headed by Iwata, were confident that they produced a great game, it did not sell well in Japan and, as a result, was not received well within Sunsoft. The game was localized as Blaster Master and released for the Nintendo Entertainment System in North America in November 1988, followed by Europe on April 25, 1991. At the time, plot elements normally present in anime (as featured in Metafight) were not yet popular; Sunsoft's American division asked the Japanese development team to change the game's original plot elements. As a result, the game's plot changed to that of Jason and his pet frog Fred, and name of the planet "Sophia the 3rd" in Metafight became the name of Jason's tank in Blaster Master. The original staff also omitted a portion of the map in the fourth level in which "the player was forced to control Jason and make a desperate suicide-leap for a ladder suspended in mid-air", after complaints from the American staff.

The game was featured on the cover of the premiere issue of VideoGames & Computer Entertainment in December 1988. Electronic Gaming Monthly listed the game at number one in its "Top Ten Games" list in the premiere issue. In Nintendo Power, the game debuted at number 12 in its "Top 30" NES games list in its March–April 1989 issue; it later climbed to number six from May to August 1989, before it peaked at number five in September, behind Zelda II: The Adventure of Link, Super Mario Bros. 2, Ninja Gaiden, and The Legend of Zelda.

Scholastic Books published a novelization of Blaster Master, written by Peter Lerangis under the pen name "A.L. Singer". The book was part of the Worlds of Power series, a collection of loose novelizations of various NES games. Lerangis had written similar novelizations for Ninja Gaiden, Infiltrator, and Bases Loaded II: Second Season. As with the other books in the series, all acts of violence portrayed in the games, including any death scenes, were removed. As a result, the bosses were portrayed in the book as "holographic projections placed over formless blobs". Shawn Struck and Scott Sharkey from 1UP.com said that Blaster Master was the hardest book for Lerangis to write because of the lack of a middle plot; he had to come up with details that were not in the game to connect the game's actual opening and conclusion. Sunsoft would use Lerangis' novel as the plot for the game's sequel, Blaster Master: Blasting Again, making the novel the only one in the Worlds of Power series to be canonized in a video game series.

Metafight, along with Ripple Island, was re-released for the PlayStation in Volume 4 of Sunsoft's Memorial Series in 2002. The game was released for the Wii's Virtual Console service in North America on December 14, 2009, followed by Japan on June 29, 2010. The Virtual Console release marked Sunsoft's first North American release since returning to developing video games for the Western market through its partnership with Gaijinworks. It was later re-released for the Nintendo 3DS Virtual Console in Japan on September 5, 2012, and in North America on July 24, 2014.

== Reception ==
Initial and retrospective reviews

Review scores
Publication	Score
AllGame	4.5/5
Famitsu	32/40
IGN	9/10
Nintendo Life	9/10
Total!	71%
Hardcore Gaming 101	8/10
Honest Gamers	4.5/5
Mean Machines	91%
Famicom Hisshoubon	3.5/5

Blaster Master received praise from reviewers for its gameplay. Steve Ryno, writing for Electronic Game Player (later known as Electronic Gaming Monthly), Steve Ryno lauded the concept of combining two "radically different" game genres into one continuous game. He added that the top-down portion contributes further to the depth of gameplay and said that "everything works well without the game becoming crowded or unbalanced". The game was featured as one of the "Truly Awesome" games in Game Players' 1988 buyer's guide. In a 1992 review in UK magazine Mean Machines, Julian Rignall praised the overall gameplay and the tank's control and movements, while co-reviewer Matt Regan enjoyed the game's fast-paced gameplay and abundance of rooms and bonus areas to explore. Jeremy Parish from 1UP.com praised the gameplay, saying that the player can explore the map "Metroidvania style" in a large, responsive tank while occasionally having to leave the tank to explore on foot, which he compared to the Warthog sequences in Halo: Combat Evolved. Nintendo Life's Corbie Dillard praised the game's responsive controls and non-linearity. In 2012, GamesRadar ranked it as the 21st best NES game ever made and felt that it was ahead of its time.

The game received positive reviews for its graphics and sound. Ryno praised the attention to detail in the graphics, adding that they transition well between levels as new and diverse environments are introduced. He also praised the fluid animation and movement of creatures in the top-down perspective and its music, which he found "pleasing" and noted that different tracks were scored for each separate level. Dillard praised the game's impressive graphics, saying that the graphics are varied, distinctive, and well-drawn; he adds that Sunsoft "did their homework" in this regard. He called the music in the game as one of the best chiptunes in the 8-bit era, noting the up-tempo tracks and high-quality sound effects. IGN's Mark Syan Sallee described the music "as memorable as anything from Nintendo", while Regan said that the game's sound effects and music bolster the gameplay and graphical atmosphere.

One of the main criticisms of Blaster Master has been its difficulty. IGN's Levi Buchanan mentioned the lack of passwords or save features as used in Metroid; the game had to be completed in one sitting. They added that some players need to exploit the "grenade glitch" to beat some of the bosses. Buchanan criticized the game for its difficulty in the on-foot portions, saying that the bosses are too difficult to beat, that the enemies regenerate upon re-entering a screen, and that players can lose a life from falling too far in the 2D platforming mode. IGN's Lucas Thomas agreed about the lack of passwords or save features, saying that because of the game's difficulty, dying near the end of the game and having to restart the game all over again without passwords or save points have caused much frustration for players. Parish criticized the game for having a limited number of continues and for the graphics in the top-down perspective, saying that the display is "incredibly cutesy compared to the tank sections, with the protagonist's head providing about 50% of his total body mass".

Some reviewers have found other criticisms in the gameplay. Buchanan mentioned that the character holds his gun in his right hand, requiring the player to compensate by moving left before shooting enemies (if the player can move left on the screen). Thomas echoed Buchanan's concerns in a later review, adding that this requires players to mentally adjust and to target enemies off-center. Thomas criticized the control of the tank, particularly the lack of traction, which he said may cause players to roll off a platform or cliff. Parish criticized the gameplay in the top-down perspective, saying that the gun the players use is too weak; he continued by adding that there are too few upgrades for it and that whenever the player takes damage, it downgrades from a "high-powered beam of death" to "a stupid unreliable peashooter of mild discomfort".

Nintendo Power reviewed the game in its February 1993 issue as part of an overview of NES games that the magazine felt were overlooked or otherwise did not sell well. The magazine said that Sunsoft should have used a licensed character to improve sales, but nonetheless praised the graphics and gameplay, saying that "the action switches between side-scrolling stages and stages that have a Zelda-ish view".

=== Legacy ===
Blaster Master has since appeared on many lists for the best games on the console. In its 100th issue in September 1997, Nintendo Power listed the game 63rd in its list of the "100 Best Games of All Time", citing its "fast and furious" gameplay. Electronic Gaming Monthly listed it at number 184 in its list of the "Top 200 Games of Their Time". IGN listed it as #22 in its "Top 100 NES Games" list. 1UP.com listed it at number 11 in its list of the "Top 25 NES Games", calling it "an action game that worked like a mishmash of every NES game before it", noting the expansive map like in Metroid. Paste magazine ranked Blaster Master as the second greatest NES game of all time, behind The Legend of Zelda; they cited the tank's additional abilities as a main reason behind its ranking.

In a 2010 interview, Iwata said that he was surprised about the game's positive reception outside Japan:

It's kind of funny that the first time I ever really had any sense of the game's success was about 10 years following the original release of Blaster Master, when a young staff member from the U.S. office said something to me like, "You'd definitely have become a super-famous game designer if you were an American".

Alex Neuse, creator of the Bit.Trip series, recalled playing Blaster Master as a child, and acknowledged that the game was a clone of Metroid that featured a tank that could jump and a corny storyline, but he said it was all "presented in a way that it felt meaningful". He also added that the game's soundtrack convinced him "that video game music could be high-quality, memorable, and evocative".

== Sequels and versions ==
At the 1992 Winter Consumer Electronics Show in Las Vegas, Sunsoft announced that they were planning to develop a sequel for the Super Nintendo Entertainment System, but it never came to be. Instead, Software Creations developed the North American-exclusive sequel Blaster Master 2 (1993) for the Sega Genesis. Other releases in the Blaster Master series include Blaster Master Boy (1991) for the Game Boy, Blaster Master: Enemy Below (2000) for the Game Boy Color, and Blaster Master: Blasting Again (2000) for the PlayStation.

A reimagining of the first game, Blaster Master: Overdrive, was released for Nintendo's WiiWare service in North America on February 8, 2010. Iwata incorporated many of the gameplay elements of the original in order "for players to recall and think back upon (the original) Blaster Master, and so my goal was to find a way to evoke that through this game".

On April 1, 2010, Sunsoft announced that a sequel to the game would be released on the Wii Virtual Console, titled Blaster Master: Destination Fred. According to their press release, the game was only purported to be tested on several PlayChoice-10 machines in the Los Angeles area between 1988 and 1989. However, Sunsoft later confirmed on their website that the sequel was an April Fools' Day hoax.

In November 2016, at the 20th Anniversary Fan Festa event in Ichikawa, Japan, Inti Creates acquired the license of the original Blaster Master game from Sunsoft. On March 9, 2017, Blaster Master Zero, a retro 8-bit style reboot of the original NES game, was released for the Nintendo 3DS eShop and Nintendo Switch. A sequel, Blaster Master Zero 2, was released on March 20, 2019, for the Switch. A second sequel, Blaster Master Zero 3, was released in 2021.

Sophia III appears as an unlockable transformation in Shantae: Half-Genie Hero, added as part of an update on July 31, 2018.

The NES version of the game was ported to the Evercade as part of the Sunsoft Collection 1 cartridge in September 2023.
