= Aicom =

Japanese video game developer (1988–2001)

Aicom/Yumekobo
- The Aicom Logo c. 1995
- Type: Video game developer
- Founded: 1988
- Defunct: 2001
- Successor: SNK
- Headquarters: Japan

The Yumekobo Logo c. 2000's

Aicom was a Japanese video game developer, founded in 1988. It was purchased by Sammy Corporation in 1992.

Its games include The Mafat Conspiracy, Totally Rad and Vice: Project Doom on the Nintendo Entertainment System, Blaster Master Boy for the Game Boy and Pulstar for Neo Geo.

Aicom broke off from Sammy in 1996 and, with funding from SNK, became Yumekobo, producing games mainly for SNK systems.

== List of games ==
This is a list of Aicom games arranged by release date, the order in regions specifies where it was released first. This list does not include Yumekobo label games.

Title	Date	Type	Platform(s)	Region(s)
RoboWarrior (Bonbā Kingu in Japan), co-developed with Hudson Soft	1987, 1988	Action	NES	Worldwide
Chuugoku Senseijutsu	1988	Miscellaneous	Famicom	JP
Amagon (Totsuzen! Macho Man in Japan)	1988, 1989	Action	NES	JP, NA
Hoops (Moero!! Junior Basket: Two on Two in Japan)	1988, 1989	Sports	NES	Worldwide
The Legendary Axe (Makyou Densetsu in Japan)	1988, 1989	Action	TurboGrafx-16	JP, NA
Flying Hero (BlazeBusters in USA)	1989	Action	Famicom	JP
P47 Thunderbolt	1989	Action	PC Engine	JP
All-Pro Basketball (Zenbei!! Pro Basketball in Japan)	1989	Sports	NES	NA, JP
Takeda Shingen	1989	Action	PC Engine	JP
Racing Hero	1989	Driving	Arcade	NA
The Astyanax (The Lord of King in Japan)	1989, 1990	Platform	Arcade, NES	Worldwide
Takin' It To The Hoop (USA Pro Basketball in Japan)	1989, 1990	Action	TurboGrafx-16	JP, NA
A.B. Cop	1990	Driving	Arcade	NA
The Mafat Conspiracy (Golgo 13 The Riddle of Icarus in Japan)	1990	Action	NES	JP, NA
Saint Dragon	1990	Action	PC Engine	JP
Ultimate Basketball (Taito Basketball in Japan)	1990, 1991	Sports game	NES	NA, JP
Totally Rad (Magic John in Japan)	1990, 1991	Action, Adventure	NES	JP, NA
Vice: Project Doom (Gun-Dec in Japan)	1991	Action, Racing / Driving	NES	JP, NA
Blaster Master Boy (Blaster Master Jr. in Europe, Bomber King: Scenario 2 in Japan)	1991	Action, Platform	Game Boy	Worldwide
Viewpoint	1992, 1995	Isometric shooter	Arcade, Neo Geo, Neo Geo CD	JP, NA
Football Fury (Ultimate Football in Japan)	1992, 1993	Sports	Super NES	JP, NA
Battle Blaze	1992, 1994	Fighter	Super NES	JP, NA
Jyanshin Densetsu: Quest of Jongmaster	1994	Puzzle	Arcade	JP
Pulstar	1995	Action	Neo Geo, Neo Geo CD, Arcade	JP, NA
Fuuun Gokuu Ninjin	1996	Action	PlayStation	JP
Dunk Star, co-developed with Sammy Corporation	Unreleased	Sports game	Neo Geo	JP

=== As Yumekobo ===
This is a list of Yumekobo games arranged by release date, the order in regions specifies where it was released first. This list does not include Aicom label games.

Title	Date	Type	Platform(s)	Region(s)
Blazing Star	1998	Shoot 'em up	Arcade, Neo Geo	NA, JP
Pocket Tennis	1998	Sport	Neo Geo Pocket	JP
Puzzle Link (Tsunagete Pon! Color in Japan)	1998	Puzzle	Neo Geo Pocket Color	Worldwide
Athena: Awakening from the Ordinary Life	1999	Adventure	PlayStation	JP
Pocket Tennis Color	1999	Sport	Neo Geo Pocket Color	Worldwide
Biomotor Unitron	1999	Role-playing video game, Strategy	Neo Geo Pocket Color	Worldwide
Fatal Fury: First Contact	1999	Fighter	Neo Geo Pocket Color	Worldwide
Prehistoric Isle 2 (Genshitou 2 in Japan; Jointly developed with Saurus)	1999	Shoot 'em up	Arcade, Neo Geo	NA, JP
Puzzle Link 2 (Tsunagete Pon! 2 in Japan)	1999	Puzzle	Neo Geo Pocket Color	JP, NA
Kikou Seiki Unitron	2000	Role-playing video game, Strategy	Neo Geo Pocket Color	JP
SNK Gals' Fighters	2000	Fighter	Neo Geo Pocket Color	Worldwide
