= Amagon =

1988 video game

- Amagon North American cover art
- Developer(s): Aicom Corporation
- Publisher(s): Vic Tokai Corporation; American Sammy
- Designer(s): Tokuhiro Takemori; Hiroshi Kazama
- Composer(s): Kiyoshi Yokoyama; Dōta Andō
- Platform(s): NES
- Release: JP: December 2, 1988; NA: April 1989
- Genre(s): 2D action platformer
- Mode(s): Single-player

Amagon, known in Japan as Totsuzen! Machoman (突然! マッチョマン, lit. Suddenly! Machoman), is a side-scrolling platform action game for the Nintendo Entertainment System developed by Aicom.

== Synopsis ==
In the game, players take the role of Amagon, a Marine who is trapped on an island after his plane crashed. Inconveniently, his rescue ship is on the other side of the island, which Amagon must now cross on foot.

The storyline used for the original Japanese release was somewhat different. The main character is a scientist named "Jackson" who transforms into his "Macho Man" form by using the special drug "Macho Max" that has been taken from his plane by the creatures of "Monster Island".

== Gameplay ==
Amagon confronting the final boss at the end of the game

Amagon encounters a variety of enemies which he can dispose of with his rifle. He also has the ability (upon collecting and then activating the Mega-Key) to transform into a larger, stronger version of himself called "Megagon". Upon transformation, Megagon is given 1 hit point for every 5,000 points he scored as Amagon (whereas a single hit from any enemy or hazard will kill Amagon). Megagon cannot use the machine gun, but instead has a punch which does eight times the damage and never runs out of ammo. At the cost of one hit point each, he can also fire waves of energy from his chest; these are much broader than machine gun shots, do 16 times the damage, and can hit multiple enemies in a single blast.

== Reception ==
Allgame gave Amagon a score of 2 stars of out of a possible 5. Just Games Retro assigned the video game a score of 40% (F) in their April 5, 2007 review of this game while Game Freaks 365 gave the video game a score of 78% (B+) in their 2005 overview of the game.
