= Viewpoint (video game) =

1992 video game

- Japanese arcade flyer
- Developers: Aicom; Nexus Interact (Sega Genesis)
- Publisher: Sammy
- Composers: Sizlla Okamura, Masaki Kase, Megumi Matsuura
- Platforms: Arcade, Neo Geo AES, Genesis, FM Towns, X68000, PlayStation
- Release: Arcade: WW: November 20, 1992; Genesis: NA: November 1994
- Genre: Scrolling shooter
- Modes: Single-player, multiplayer
- Arcade system: Neo Geo MVS

Viewpoint (Note: Japanese: ビューポイント, Hepburn: Byūpointo) is a scrolling shooter arcade game developed by Aicom and originally released in 1992 by Sammy and SNK for the Neo Geo hardware family. The arcade version was met with critical acclaim upon release for its cutting-edge visuals and hip hop-influenced soundtrack, though later ports for the Sega Genesis and Sony PlayStation saw much more mixed reviews.

== Gameplay ==
Arcade version screenshot

Viewpoint is Sammy's only game for the Neo-Geo Multi Video System hardware. By default, Player 1 and Player 2 can only play one after another; in the Service Mode though, simultaneous gameplay can be enabled. Along with the ship's primary weapons, the player also has access to three bombs: one that can make a wave of fire that starts from behind the player's ship and scrolls "up" the screen, one that makes a powerful circular, nova-like blast, and one that shoots several mini-missiles capable of homing in on multiple targets. The game has six stages.

== Development and release ==
Viewpoint was developed by Aicom, a small Japanese studio known for games such as The Legendary Axe and The Astyanax. It was published in November 1992 by Sammy Corporation, being their first foray into the market since the early 1980s. The game's isometric-scrolling gameplay was largely inspired by Sega's Zaxxon, with its overall aesthetic taking inspiration from games like Xevious and R-Type. Viewpoint ran on the Neo Geo MVS arcade system board, being Sammy's only game for the system. The game's 3D graphics were drawn entirely by hand, as opposed to using pre-rendering software or 3D hardware.

Viewpoint also saw release on a variety of home platforms, including the Genesis and PlayStation game consoles and the X68000 and FM Towns computers. The former port of the game made its international debut outside North America for the Genesis Mini 2 microconsole in late October 2022. A port for the Sega Saturn was due in 1996; however, it was cancelled. At one point, an 8-bit version for the Game Boy Color was planned, but it was cancelled as well.

== Reception ==
Reception

Review scores
Publication	Score
AllGame	4/5 (Arcade); 4/5 (Neo Geo); 2/5 (Playstation); 2/5 (Genesis)
Computer and Video Games	95% (Arcade)
Electronic Gaming Monthly	7/10 (Genesis); 7.625/10 (PlayStation)
Famitsu	30/40 (Neo Geo)
GameFan	198.5/200 (Neo Geo)
IGN	2/10 (PlayStation)
Next Generation	3/5 (Genesis)
Sinclair User	96% (Arcade)

In North America, RePlay reported Viewpoint to be the fifteenth most-popular arcade game in April 1993.

The Neo Geo version received critical acclaim. Viewpoint was awarded both Best Graphics and Best Music in a Video Game in Electronic Gaming Monthly's 1992 video game awards. On release, Famicom Tsūshin scored the Neo Geo version of the game a 30 out of 40. The Neo Geo arcade version received highly positive reviews from Computer and Video Games, which scored it 95%, and Sinclair User, which scored it 96%. GameFan's two reviewers scored the Neo Geo console version 99.5% and 99%, stating that it is "the best game on the system so far." GamePro gave it a full score of 5 in all four categories (graphics, sound, control, and fun factor). They noted similarities to Zaxxon, but praised Viewpoint's graphics, animated backgrounds, hip hop style funky dance music, and gameplay.

The later ports were much more divisive. Electronic Gaming Monthly's five reviewers scored the Genesis version 8, 6, 7, 7, and 7 out of 10 (average 7 out of 10). Though they noted that it has some severe slowdown and music which fails to approximate the original version's, they rated it as an overall good conversion. Next Generation similarly said that though the graphics and music fail to effectively recreate those of the Neo Geo version, it is an exceptionally good port given that it is for a less powerful system and on a cartridge a fraction of the size of the Neo Geo one. Their main criticism was with the game itself, which they said gets dull fairly quickly due to the redundancy of the level designs.

The four reviewers of Electronic Gaming Monthly scored the PlayStation version 30.5 out of 40 (average 7.625 out of 10). They praised the PlayStation version's improved visuals over the Neo Geo version, but most felt that the new soundtrack was inappropriate. All four reviewers concurred that the game is "unbelievably hard", but were divided on whether this was a good or bad thing. GamePro took the side of it being a bad thing; though they praised the "fresh, futuristic look" and enhanced audio of the PlayStation version, they felt the combination of overly high difficulty and "gummy" controls made the game not fun to play. Next Generation said that while the Neo Geo original is justifiably held in high esteem, the PlayStation conversion suffers from slow pacing, sluggish control, and most especially the excessively hard difficulty: "We have no idea what kind of sadist converted this, but unless you're also an equally extreme masochist, give it a wide berth." Maximum also held the PlayStation version to be inferior to the Neo Geo version, commenting that though the graphics were generally improved, some sections looked better on the Neo Geo, and the music and gameplay were much worse. However, they added: "Judging Viewpoint as a game on its own (as opposed to comparing it to the Neo Geo), it's not bad at all, offering plenty of blasting action and much entertainment."

== Legacy ==
Viewpoint 2064 was announced for the Nintendo 64 in 1999, but Sammy Corporation had development issues, so it was cancelled. A prototype resurfaced in October 2015 on an online auction. An apparently final version of the game was discovered in 2025.
