= Football Fury =

1992 video game

- North American cover art
- Developer(s): Aicom (merged into Sammy Studios)
- Publisher(s): JP: Sammy Studios; NA: American Sammy
- Composer(s): Megumi Maz-ura
- Platform(s): Super NES
- Release: JP: July 24, 1992; NA: October 1993
- Genre(s): Traditional football simulation
- Mode(s): Single-player, multiplayer

Football Fury (ウルティメイト フットボール; lit. "Ultimate Football") is a Super NES video game that was released in 1992. The game's full Japanese name is Ultimate Football: Try Formation!.

== Summary ==
A Stallions player stands in his own end zone in Football Fury (1992), appearing to face the wrong direction.

There are two conferences: the United States Football Conference (USFC) and the American All-Star Football Conference (AAFC). Even though the teams are fictional, they use the cities of the actual NFL teams of the early 1990s. Passwords allow saved games to be restored while a news report is made after each game through the fictional cable television network ZIFN.
