= Golgo 13 =

Japanese manga and media franchise

- First tankōbon volume cover, featuring Duke Togo

ゴルゴ13 (Gorugo Sātīn)
- Genre: Thriller
- Manga
- Written by: Takao Saito (1968–2021); Saito Production (2021–present)
- Published by: Shogakukan; Leed Publishing
- English publisher: NA: Viz Media
- Magazine: Big Comic
- Original run: October 1968 – present
- Volumes: 221
- Anime television series
- Produced by: Yutaka Saito; Haruyuki Kawajima
- Written by: Wada Yoshinori
- Music by: Takeo Yamashita
- Studio: Saito Production
- Original network: TBS
- Original run: 1971
- Episodes: 40
- Anime television series
- Directed by: Shunji Ōga
- Produced by: Susumu Matsuyama; Shunji Aoki
- Written by: Junichi Iioka
- Music by: Daisuke Ikeda
- Studio: The Answer Studio
- Licensed by: AUS: Siren Visual; NA: Sentai Filmworks
- Original network: TV Tokyo
- English network: NA: Anime Network
- Original run: April 11, 2008 – March 27, 2009
- Episodes: 50
- Manga

Gunsmith Dave
- Written by: Takao Saito; Saito Production
- Published by: Shogakukan
- Magazine: Big Comic Zōkan
- Original run: July 17, 2021 – present
- Volumes: 2
- Manga

Golgo Camp
- Written by: Yukio Miyama
- Published by: Shogakukan
- Magazine: MangaONE
- Original run: August 28, 2021 – November 26, 2022
- Volumes: 1
- Manga

G no Idenshi: Shōjo Fanette
- Written by: Takao Saito; Saito Production
- Published by: Shogakukan
- Magazine: Big Comic Zōkan
- Original run: July 15, 2022 – November 17, 2023
- Volumes: 2
- Films and original video animation
- Golgo 13 (1973 live-action film); Assignment Kowloon (1977 live-action film); The Professional (1983 anime film); Queen Bee (1998 OVA)
- Video games
- Top Secret Episode (1988); The Mafat Conspiracy (1990)
- icon

Golgo 13 (Japanese: ゴルゴ13, Hepburn: Gorugo Sātīn) is a Japanese manga series written and illustrated by Takao Saito, published in Shogakukan's seinen manga magazine Big Comic since October 1968. The series follows the title character, a professional hitman for hire. Golgo 13 is the oldest manga still in publication, and its tankōbon edition was certified by Guinness World Records as the highest number of volumes for a manga series. Before his death in 2021, Saito said that he wanted the manga to continue on without him; he had previously said that he was worried that the manga might be left unfinished. The Saito Production group of manga creators continue its publication with the assistance of the Big Comic's editorial department.

The series has been adapted into two live-action feature films, an anime film, an original video animation, an anime television series and six video games.

With a cumulative total of 300 million copies in circulation in various formats, including compilation books, it is one of the best-selling manga series. The manga won the 1975 Shogakukan Manga Award for general manga and the Grand Prize at the 2002 Japan Cartoonists Association Awards.

== Story ==
"Golgo 13" is a professional hitman with perfect 100% accuracy. His real name, nationality, permanent address and age are unknown and there is no record in any worldwide intelligence agencies as to his true identity. All of his assignments are completed with the use of a sniper rifle. His most frequently used alias is Duke Togo (デューク・東郷, Dyūku Tōgō).

Duke Togo shows no emotion when carrying out an assignment and is willing to kill anyone. He'll accept any assignment from anyone who can afford his services. Taking out terrorists has always brought on retaliations against Golgo 13, so he constantly watches out for assassins hired to kill him. Golgo 13 also works with people to assist him in his assignments, such as giving information on his targets, providing a vehicle, a secondary gun, or gadgets.

The nickname Golgo 13 is a reference to the death of Jesus Christ. Golgo is short for Golgotha, the place of Jesus' crucifixion, while the number 13 is considered an unlucky number. Also, Golgo 13's logo is a skeleton wearing a crown of thorns.

Duke Togo's past is a mystery. With respect to the character's age, all of the stories are centered around current events of the time. However, Golgo 13 himself has not aged significantly despite these events. He has however suffered multiple injuries throughout the series, leaving many different scars on his body.

== Production ==
Early on, Takao Saito developed a system where he created the page layout based on a script written by the editorial department. He also inked the main characters' faces, while assistants provided the backgrounds and other elements. He did extensive research to provide accuracy, especially when the plot dealt with technology. Kazuo Koike was one of the writers on the series in the beginning. Author Yoichi Funado wrote approximately 30 stories for Golgo 13, three of which he later novelized. Takashi Nagasaki was Saito's editor on the series in the mid-1980s, and later wrote two stories for the manga under the pen name "Keishi Edogawa".

According to Jason Thompson, several Golgo 13 stories have not been reprinted for being "offensive or libelous". Thompson lists one from 1986 because of complaints from the Iranian embassy in Japan, another from 1988 about money laundering in the Vatican, and one from 1989 about a Hollywood actor blackmailed when someone discovers he has AIDS.

In 2013, Saito stated that because he often worried about his manga being cancelled, he had an ending planned out that even included the panel layout. He said he had no idea when Golgo 13 would end, claiming "The manga has continued so long that it is no longer the property of the author; it belongs to the readers." Two years later, Big Comic's fourth issue of 2015 announced that the series was "heading towards its conclusion."

Due to difficulties that arose from the restrictions implemented by the government to combat the COVID-19 pandemic in Japan, Golgo 13 began its first hiatus in its 52-year history in May 2020. It returned on July 7, 2020.

Saito died of pancreatic cancer at 84 on September 24, 2021. According to Shogakukan, Saito said before his death that he wanted the manga to continue on without him. The Saito Production group of manga creators continues its publication with the assistance of Big Comic's editorial department.

== Media ==
=== Manga ===
Written and illustrated by Takao Saito, Golgo 13 has been serialized in the monthly manga magazine Big Comic since its January 1969 issue, published in October 1968. The chapters have been collected into tankōbon volumes by Shogakukan and Leed Publishing, a spinoff of the author's own Saito Production, since June 21, 1973. As of July 2026, 221 volumes of the tankōbon edition have been published, while the bunkoban edition has 177 volumes.

In 1986, Leed Publishing released four Golgo 13 stories translated by Patrick Connolly: "Into the Wolves' Lair", "Galinpero", "The Ice Lake Hit" and "The Ivory Connection".

In 1989 and 1990, Leed and Vic Tokai published two further Golgo 13 comic books, "The Impossible Hit" and "The Border Hopper", as part of the promotion for two Golgo 13 video games. The comics were released to the US public via a mail-in offer with the purchase of the games and were later even found packaged with the video games. Each issue contained one complete story and had nothing to do with the storylines of the video games themselves.

In 1991, Leed Publishing and Viz Media published The Professional: Golgo 13, a three-part mini-series. The Professional was a re-printing of "The Argentine Tiger", a story where Golgo is hired by the British Government to assassinate the reportedly dead ex-president of Argentina Juan Perón.

In 2006, Golgo 13 was brought back by Viz as part of their Viz Signature collection. The stories are picked from the forty-year history of the manga, and do not necessarily represent the original's order of publication. A total of thirteen volumes were published, with the thirteenth volume being published on February 19, 2008. Each volume ends with an editorial commentary on Golgo 13 as a cultural phenomenon in Japan.

==== Spin-offs ====
A spin-off manga titled Gunsmith Dave (銃器職人・デイブ) and focusing on the character Dave McCartney began serialization in the August special issue of Big Comic on July 17, 2021. The spin-off ended its "first season" on May 17, 2022, and resumed on February 17, 2024. Saito and Saito Production are credited with creating the manga. Its first volume was released on September 30, 2022. As of January 30, 2025, two volumes have been released.

A second spin-off, Golgo Camp (ゴルゴCAMP) created by Yukio Miyama, was launched on Shogakukan's MangaONE app on August 28, 2021. It is a gag comedy and follows Golgo 13 at a modern-day campsite.

A third spin-off, G no Idenshi: Shōjo Fanette (Gの遺伝子 少女ファネット), was serialized for eight chapters in Big Comic Zōkan from July 15, 2022, to November 17, 2023. It focuses on the French junior high school student Fanette, who has Golgo's genes. Its chapters were collected in two volumes, released on May 30, 2023, and February 29, 2024.

=== Live action ===
Toei Company produced a live-action film simply titled Golgo 13 in 1973, directed by Junya Sato and starring Ken Takakura as Duke Togo and Pouri Banayi as Catherine Morton. It was filmed entirely in the Imperial State of Iran with an entirely Persian supporting cast. It was followed by Golgo 13: Assignment Kowloon in 1977, directed by Yukio Noda, which replaced Takakura with Sonny Chiba. In 2011, production company Davis Film obtained the American film rights to Golgo.

=== Anime ===
==== 1971 television series ====
The first Golgo 13 anime series aired on TBS in 1971 for 40 episodes. In November 2023, it was reported that the series, allegedly lost for many years, was found and would be broadcast on television for the first time in over 50 years. Selected episodes were broadcast on BS-TBS, under the title Golgo 13 Selection, on December 10–17, 2023. The series' episodes started streaming on Amazon Prime and other streaming services in Japan on December 29, 2023, premiering the first ten episodes. Ten more episodes have been released at the end of each month, with all 40 episodes available by the end of March 2024.

==== Golgo 13: The Professional ====
Golgo 13: The Professional, known simply as Golgo 13 in Japan, is a 1983 animated featured film. Golgo 13's voice is provided by Tetsurō Sagawa in the Japanese version, and Gregory Snegoff in Streamline Pictures' English dub. It incorporates CGI animation, which was in its infancy at the time. This is most notable in the scene where army helicopters circle around Dawson Tower and attack Golgo as he climbs toward Dawson's office on the top floor.

==== Golgo 13: Queen Bee ====
Golgo 13: Queen Bee is an original video animation that was released in 1998. Tesshō Genda provides the voice of Golgo 13 in the Japanese version, while in the English version, he is voiced by John DiMaggio.

==== 2008 television series ====
A Golgo 13 anime television series was produced by The Answer Studio. The series aired on TV Tokyo and other stations from April 11, 2008, to March 27, 2009, for 50 episodes. Hiroshi Tachi provides the voice of Golgo 13. The series was licensed by Sentai Filmworks, with the first DVD released on July 13, 2010. In English, Golgo is voiced by David Wald.

The anime aired in North America on the Anime Network on Demand channel. It is also aired on television in the Philippines by TV5 and in South Korea by Animax Korea.

The first opening theme song is "Take the Wave" by Naifu for the first 25 episodes, and the second is "So Far Away" by Pinc Inc for the remaining. The first ending theme song for the first 12 episodes is "Garasu no Haiwei (Highway of Glass)" by doa, while "Yume no Hitotsu" by Garnet Crow is used for episodes 13–25. The third ending theme is "Sono Egao Yo Eien ni" by Aiko Kitahara for episodes 26 to 38, and the final ending song is "Mou Kimi wo Hitori ni Sasenai" by U-ka Saegusa in dB from 39 to 50.

=== Video games ===
Several video games based on Golgo 13 have been released:

- The first Golgo 13 video game was released for the Sega SG-1000 in 1984, followed by Golgo 13: Oi no Su for the MSX in 1985.
- Two games were released by Vic Tokai on the Nintendo Entertainment System: Golgo 13: Top Secret Episode (1988) and The Mafat Conspiracy (1990). Both are the only Golgo 13 games to receive official English releases, with the license intact.
- Two digital manga were released only in Japan for the PlayStation and Microsoft Windows in 1998; the digital manga features English text option, in addition to Japanese.
- Namco and Eighting/Raizing developed three lightgun arcade games, similar to the Silent Scope series, but with a few differences. The rifle only contained a magnifying lens, not a small monitor like Silent Scope. The screen itself would close up on the target only when the sensor on the underside of the rifle base was activated by the player leaning their shoulder into it. Each mission was preceded by an eight- to ten-panel manga briefing. The first two releases, Golgo 13 in 1999 and Golgo 13: Kiseki no Dandou (Golgo 13: Miraculous Trajectory) in 2000, ran on Namco System 12 hardware, with the third, Golgo 13: Juusei no Chinkonka (Golgo 13: Requiem of a Gunshot) in 2001, on Namco System 10 hardware.
- The most recent Golgo 13 game, Golgo 13: File G-13, was released for the Nintendo DS on June 18, 2009, by Marvelous Entertainment. The game consists of a large quiz mode, featuring questions spanning the forty-year history of Golgo 13, as well as several mini-games, including the "Don't Stand Behind Me" game, in which the player, as Golgo 13, must punch people who walk up behind him (a reference to the tagline shown at the end of each episode of the 2008 anime, "Do not stand behind him, if you value your life.") The game is played holding the DS on its side, also known as "book style".

There was also an LCD game based on Golgo 13 released only in Japan by Popy in 1982, as well as several pachinko and pachislot machines released in Japan between 2001 and 2017, one of which receiving a simulator port for the PlayStation in 2002.

A version of Golgo 13's signature weapon, the sniper rifle, was released in the Japanese version of Alliance of Valiant Arms as a usable weapon.

=== Other media ===
In addition, the title character has appeared in a number of TV commercials in Japan, including NEC and Lotte Black Black. There was also a radio drama featuring Masane Tsukayama as Golgo 13.

An Airsoft gun has been made by Tokyo Marui based on the rifle Golgo 13 uses. A figure based on Golgo 13 was released on August 25, 2009.

== Reception ==
Golgo 13 won the 21st Shogakukan Manga Award in the General category in 1975, the Grand Prize at the 2002 Japan Cartoonists Association Awards, and the Special Judges Award at the 50th Shogakukan Manga Awards in 2005. With the publication of volume 201 in July 2021, Golgo 13 was certified as holding the Guinness World Record for "Most volumes published for a single manga series." On TV Asahi's Manga Sōsenkyo 2021 poll, in which 150,000 people voted for their top 100 manga series, Golgo 13 ranked 36th. Golgo 13 is one of the works credited with popularizing the gekiga movement in Japanese comics, which strives for more realistic and dramatic works. Saito himself is surprised by his series' popularity overseas, because it is firmly rooted in Japanese culture and samurai. He cited the timing of when Golgo actually takes his shot as an example; "It evokes iaidō [the martial art of drawing one's sword and mimicking a deadly blow]. It is the same movement and the same shape. I love Japanese samurai stories and that is why, unconsciously, Golgo moves like a samurai. That is why I thought foreigners wouldn't understand the story."

By March 2021, Golgo 13 had over 300 million copies in circulation in various formats, including compilation books, it is the second-best-selling manga series and the top-selling seinen manga series in history.

Anime News Network's Carl Kimlinger compared Saito's work on the series to the novels of John le Carré and Frederick Forsyth, as the stories are "dark, meticulously constructed [and] painstakingly realistic". Leo Lewis of the Financial Times wrote that "Unsmiling, misogynist and inexorable, [the character] is a literary cousin of James Bond without the scene-softeners of Moneypenny, M, Q or exploding fountain pens." The Daily Vanguard called Duke "something like a cross between Dirty Harry and Metal Gear Solid's Solid Snake." JC DuBois of Dragon's Anime has criticized those who say that most of Golgo 13's hits are impossible to do since there are problems that would prevent him from shooting straight such as the wind or with the coriolis effect, saying that the "whole mystique of Golgo 13 is that he's just that damn good. He CAN make those shots—and he can do it with one shot."
