= GP Rider =

1990 video game

- Japanese flyer showing a two-player sit-down version of the arcade cabinet
- Developer: Sega AM2
- Publisher: Sega
- Producer: Yu Suzuki
- Composers: Hiroshi Kawaguchi; Takenobu Mitsuyoshi
- Platforms: Arcade, Master System, Game Gear
- Release: October 1990: Arcade; JP: October 1990; NA/EU: November 1990 Master System; EU: 1993 Game Gear; NA: March 1994; EU: 1994; JP: April 22, 1994
- Genre: Racing
- Modes: Single-player, multiplayer
- Arcade system: Sega X Board

GP Rider (Note: Japanese: GPライダー, Hepburn: Jī Pī raidā) is a 1990 racing game developed and published by Sega for arcades. It came in a two-player motion simulator cabinet and a standard upright cabinet. It was ported to the Master System in 1993 and the Game Gear in 1994.

== Ports ==
The Master System version is played in split-screen mode (similar to the Genesis port of OutRunners) regardless of if one or two players are playing. If only one player is racing then the second player is replaced by a computer opponent called "Wayne" (possibly a reference to Wayne Rainey), who plays like a human player in that his performance varies from race to race, in contrast to most racing games of the era, where the main opponent is programmed to always finish in the same position.

The Game Gear version is essentially a rebranded port of Super Hang-On, featuring assets and gameplay from that game.

== Reception ==
Reception

Review scores
Publication	Score		
Publication	Arcade	Game Gear	Master System
AllGame	3/5		
Computer and Video Games	90%		
Famitsu		19/40	
Sinclair User	88%		
Video Games (DE)			58%
CU Amiga	93%		
RePlay	Positive		
Sega Master Force			48%
The One	Positive		

In Japan, Game Machine listed GP Rider as the fourth most successful upright arcade unit of November 1990. It went on to be Japan's sixth highest-grossing dedicated arcade game of 1991.

The arcade game received positive reviews upon release. The One in 1991 called it a "realistic motorcycle simulation" and praised its graphics, expressing that GP Rider has "amazingly smooth scrolling" and "great new gradient effects". The One also praised GP Rider's motorcycle controller hardware as "realistic" and adding to the game's atmosphere. The One noted GP Rider was "the first motorcycle game that lets you race against another player", and expressed that this competitive "head-to-head excitement with a superb implementation and ultra realistic bike handling" made GP Rider a good major coin investment.

== See also ==
- Hang-On
- Racing Hero
