= Master Blaster =

Master Blaster may refer to:

== Film and television ==
- Masterblaster (film), a 1987 American movie
- Master Blaster, a pair of characters from the 1985 action adventure Mad Max Beyond Thunderdome
- "Master Blaster", the TV series Beast Wars episode (1999)
- Master Blaster, a character from the series Kidd Video
- Master Blasters, an American game show that debuted on July 27, 2005

== Music ==
- Master Blaster (band), a German dance band
- "Master Blaster (Jammin')", a 1980 song by Stevie Wonder
- "Masterblaster 2000", a hit cover of "Master Blaster (Jammin')" by DJ Luck & MC Neat
- "Master Blaster", a 1996 song by Nikka Costa from Butterfly Rocket
- "Master the Blaster", a song by Bjorn Surrao from the 2021 Indian film Master

== People ==
- Master Blaster (musician), former Ugandan dance-hall musician
- Sachin Tendulkar, Indian former cricketer
- Viv Richards, West Indian Cricketer
- Sanath Jayasuriya, Sri Lankan cricketer
- Joe Weider, Canadian bodybuilder and businessman
- Samir Jyoti Joshi, Realised Being

== Water park rides ==
- Master Blaster or MasterBlaster, a type of water coaster
- Master Blaster (Schlitterbahn), a water coaster at Schlitterbahn, New Braunfels, Texas, U.S.
- Master Blaster, a roller coaster at Sandcastle Waterworld, England

== Other uses ==
- Master Blaster, the job title of a senior explosives engineer working with materials such as Tovex
- The Master Blasters, a professional wrestling tag team

== See also ==
- Blaster Master (disambiguation)
- Raster Blaster
