= Vice: Project Doom =

1991 video game

- North American box art
- Developer: Aicom
- Publisher: Sammy Corporation
- Composer: Kiyoshi Yokoyama
- Platform: Nintendo Entertainment System
- Release: JP: April 26, 1991; NA: November 1991
- Genres: Platformer, driving, shooter
- Mode: Single-player

Vice: Project Doom (Note: known in Japan as Gun-Dec (ガンデック)) is a 1991 action video game developed by Aicom and published by Sammy Corporation for the Nintendo Entertainment System. The game was released in Japan on April 26, 1991, and in North America in November 1991. Vice: Project Doom is a side-scrolling platformer with noticeable similarities to the Ninja Gaiden series for the NES, with the addition of gun shooting and driving segments as well. The player assumes the role of a secret agent who must uncover a conspiracy involving a new kind of alien substance. A Sega Mega Drive conversion titled Deep Scanner was in development, but never released. It was released on the Nintendo Classics service in August 2019 by Sega, as Sammy had retained the rights to the game prior to merging with Sega.

== Gameplay ==
Stage 2-1 of Vice: Project Doom, the Waterfront & Construction Site

Vice: Project Doom consists of 11 stages. The very first level, as well as Stage 10, are driving stages, while Stage 4-2 and 11-1 are shooting stages; the rest are standard side-scrolling/parallax-scrolling stages. Each begins with a movie-style sequence which provides the game's narrative. As usual of the genre, the player has a health gauge and a limited number of lives. Unlimited continues are provided as well.

In the main stages, Hart can switch between one of three weapons: a Laser whip, a .44 Magnum revolver, and a supply of M-24 Stick grenades. The laser whip is a short-range weapon that can be used infinitely, while bullets and grenades are limited and must be replenished by picking additional supplies dropped by defeated enemies. Other power-ups include Meat and other health-restoring aids, and as well as coins that will give the player one extra life for every 100 collected. In the main segments, Hart can jump, attack, crouch, and climb ladders like in most other action games. He can also run while crouching.

In the vehicle stages, the action is viewed from an overhead perspective. Hart drives a Ferrari F-40 red; the player maneuvers the car through the road while shifting between three gears and shooting at enemy vehicles with the car's equipped gun. In the shooting segments, the action is viewed from Hart's perspective. The player moves the target indicator around the moving scenery, shooting the gun with one button and tossing grenades with the other. The game's stages are Route 246, Waterfront (Construction Site), Chinatown, Port, Ricardo Range, Warehouse 0001, Train and Sewers, Power Plant, Bio-Tech Laboratory, Harbor, and finally the BEDA Corporate Headquarters.

== Plot ==
The game has a large number of cut-scenes for its time, in which a full-fledged plot in the genres of anime, noir and biopunk is revealed.

In the distant future, the B.E.D.A. Corporation, a company involved in the development of electronic equipment and military weapons, is actually a front operated by a race of alien beings who have been living on the Earth for centuries in secrecy. The aliens have developed a substance named "Gel", which was initially intended to be used as food for their species, but also functions as an addictive substance to humans that results in terrible side-effects and is now being sold as an illegal drug within the underworld. The player takes the role of Detective Hart, a member of the Vice unit who is assigned to investigate the B.E.D.A. Corporation following the disappearance of his partner Reese during a previous case. During his mission, Hart is assisted by his lover and fellow Vice agent Christy, and Sophia, an acquaintance of the two.

Inspector Hart is ordered to stop a maniac on a road. After battling a high-tech, heavily armed truck, Hart discovers a monster, not a man, behind the wheel. His cargo is an unknown substance. Hart asks Christy and Sophia to find out its nature, and they report that the substance (probably a drug) leads to mafia and sorcerer Kim Long (in other translation – Kim Ron). Hart goes to China in search of him, and after breaking through mafia and monsters, he defeats Kim in battle. Christy determines that his clothes had soil particles from city of Ricardo (probably fictitious) in Central America. The information received leads Hart to a secret research base in the jungle, where he fights a certain flying cyborg. Defeating him, Hart recognizes his former friend, Captain Reese, whom he believed to be dead. He repents that he was once considered a war hero, because "there are no heroes in war." He tries to tell that a man with the face of Hart himself is behind the vice project, but at that moment he receives a bullet from an unknown sniper, but manages to say that Chris was kidnapped. The hero pursues the mercenaries on a train, fights the cyborgs in sewers and at the power plant, and finally Sofia says that Chris needs to be looked for in the biolaboratory. There he witnesses experiments on humans and animals and fights with a certain slimy mutant, but after defeating it, he realizes this is Chris, she confesses her love to him and dies in his arms, having managed to report that B.E.D.A. Corporation is behind everything (in Russian "beda" means "trouble", "doom"). Hart also sees his own clones in the flasks. To avenge his girlfriend, Hart breaks through an ambush on the road and enters the corporate headquarters, where director is waiting for him behind the security lines, and he looks like an aged Hart. He explains that he considers all of humanity to be pigs, and himself to be the one who can give them everything they deserve, the hero is a clone of the villain, and the corporation should be controlled by a dynasty of such clones, replacing each other. Hart refuses the offer to take over the board. A fight ensues between them, and Hart defeats the director of the corporation, first as a human, then as a monster. Dying, he says that fate cannot be avoided. Hart leaves, but another clone comes to life in the flask.

== Release ==
Vice: Project Doom was released on Nintendo Classics via Nintendo Switch Online subscription service on August 21, 2019. Sega served as the publisher.

== Reception ==
Allgame gave Vice: Project Doom an overall rating of 2.5 stars out of a possible 5 stars. The May 1991 issue of the North American gaming magazine Nintendo Power gave this game an overall rating of 3.8 out of 5.
