= A.B. Cop =

1991 video game

- Developer: Aicom
- Publisher: Sega
- Composer: Hikoshi Hashimoto
- Platform: Arcade
- Release: WW: January 1991
- Genres: Racing, vehicular combat
- Mode: Single-player
- Arcade system: Sega X Board

A.B. Cop, also known as Air Bike Cop, is a racing video game developed by Aicom and published by Sega in 1991 for arcades.

== Gameplay ==
Gameplay screenshot

Gameplay is similar to that of Chase H.Q.. The player takes on the role of the A.B. (Air Bike) Cop who must chase down and destroy the perpetrators of various crimes (which changes every level) before the time limit expires. A.B Cop introduced an element new to the racing genre: the end-of-level guardian.

== Development and release ==
A.B. Cop was developed by Aicom and released in arcades by Sega in 1991 using their X Board. The soundtrack was composed by Hikoshi Hashimoto. The game has not received any official port to home consoles.

== Reception ==
In Japan, Game Machine listed A.B. Cop on their March 1, 1991 issue as being the thirteenth most-successful upright/cockpit arcade unit of the month, outperforming titles such as Winning Run Suzuka GP and Special Criminal Investigation. Mark Caswell of Zzap!64 gave the game an overall mixed outlook. Spanish magazine Micromanía gave it a positive outlook. Kurt Kalata of Hardcore Gaming 101 gave it a positive retrospective outlook.
