= Golgo 13: Top Secret Episode =

1988 video game

- North American cover art
- Developer: Vic Tokai
- Publisher: Vic Tokai
- Director: Shoichi Yoshikawa
- Programmers: Tomiko Narusawa; Megumi Kudo; Tomohiko Kawamura
- Artists: Hiroyuki Sato; Tomomi Seki; Tomohiko Kawamura; Shoichi Yoshikawa
- Composer: Michiharu Hasuya
- Series: Golgo 13
- Platform: NES
- Release: JP: March 26, 1988; NA: September 1988
- Genre: Action adventure
- Mode: Single-player

Golgo 13: Top Secret Episode (ゴルゴ13 第一章神々の黄昏, Gorugo Sātīn Dai-Isshō Kamigami no Tasogare; Golgo 13 Episode 1: Twilight of the Gods) is an action video game for the Nintendo Entertainment System (NES); it was released in 1988.

In this game, based on a popular manga, the player takes on the role of Golgo 13 (also known as Duke Togo), a hitman whose assignment is to eliminate the leader of the Drek group. The story begins when a helicopter transporting a vial of a deadly bacillus known as "Cassandra G" is destroyed near the Statue of Liberty, but the vial is nowhere to be found in the wreckage. On the way, Golgo 13 must pass through several acts, including East Berlin, Athens, Rio de Janeiro, and Alexander Island, which is located off the coast of Antarctica.

== See also ==
- The Mafat Conspiracy
