= Blaster Master =

Video game franchise

- Logo of the first game in the series
- Genres: Action, platform, run and gun
- Developers: Sunsoft; Inti Creates
- Publishers: Sunsoft; Inti Creates
- First release: Blaster Master; June 17, 1988
- Latest release: Blaster Master Zero 3 July 29, 2021

Blaster Master is a video game series that was originally developed and published by Sunsoft. It began with the 1988 video game Blaster Master for the Nintendo Entertainment System, and the series has been rebooted twice. The first reboot, Blaster Master: Overdrive, was released in 2010 and intended to "rebuild the Sunsoft brand in North America", but it received mediocre reception from critics and did not see a follow-up.

After another hiatus, the series was rebooted again by developer Inti Creates with the 2017 video game Blaster Master Zero, which retained an 8-bit style of graphics alongside similar gameplay and level design to the original, serving as a sort of reimagining of the title. The game was a collaborative effort between Sunsoft and Inti Creates, with Sunsoft still owning the property but Inti Creates handling full development and publishing. Its success led to it receiving two fully original sequels, Blaster Master Zero 2 in 2019 and Blaster Master Zero 3 in 2021.

The premise of the series revolves around Jason, a young man who uses a special tank known as SOFIA to explore areas and battle radioactive mutants. The games feature both on-foot and tank sections with unique gameplay for each section.

== Games ==
Release timeline
1988	Blaster Master
1989–1990
1991	Blaster Master Boy
1992
1993	Blaster Master 2
1994–1999
2000	Blaster Master: Enemy Below; Blaster Master: Blasting Again
2001–2009
2010	Blaster Master: Overdrive
2011–2016
2017	Blaster Master Zero
2018
2019	Blaster Master Zero 2
2020
2021	Blaster Master Zero 3

=== Blaster Master ===
Blaster Master is a platform and run and gun video game released by Sunsoft for the Nintendo Entertainment System. It is a localized version of a Japanese Famicom game titled Chō Wakusei Senki Metafight (超惑星戦記メタファイト, lit. "Super Planetary War Records: Metafight", also simply called Metafight), which was released on Jun 17, 1988. The game was released in North America in November 1988 and in Europe on April 25, 1991.

=== Blaster Master Boy ===
Blaster Master Boy, known as Bomber King: Scenario 2 (ボンバーキング シナリオ2) in Japan and Blaster Master Jr. in Europe, is an action video game developed by Aicom and published by Sunsoft. The game was released in 1991 for Game Boy. It is a spin-off that has little in common with the main series, being a sequel to Robowarrior, a spin-off title in the Bomberman series by Hudson Soft. The game was marketed in Western territories as a game in the Blaster Master series.

=== Blaster Master Zero ===
Blaster Master Zero is an action-adventure platform video game developed and published by Inti Creates for the Nintendo 3DS and Nintendo Switch. The game is a reboot of the original Blaster Master, and was released worldwide in March 2017. It was subsequently ported to Microsoft Windows and PlayStation 4 in June 2019 and June 2020 respectively.

The game remains relatively close to the original, such that it can also be seen as a remake. Its story combines aspects of Blaster Master, Metafight, and the novelization of the game. The character Jason is changed to be an older and more experienced scientific genius, although the game retains the "absurd" frog subplot.

=== Blaster Master Zero 3 ===
Blaster Master Zero 3 was announced by Inti Creates on March 4, 2021, and then released on July 29, 2021, for Nintendo Switch, PlayStation 4, and Windows for both Steam and Epic Games Store.

== Other media ==
A short-lived comic loosely based on the premise of the original Blaster Master ran in the Sunsoft Game Times News newsletter in 1989. It was credited to Todd M. Papaleo and also featured characters from the arcade game Xenophobe. In 1990, the series received a novelization under the Worlds of Power series of children's books released by Scholastic. While heavy liberties were taken with the source material, elements of the novel would go on to become canon in later games, namely the character Eve, who went on to become a major character in the Blaster Master Zero series.
