= Totally Rad =

1990 video game

- North American box art
- Developer(s): Aicom
- Publisher(s): Jaleco
- Composer(s): Kazuo Sawa; Toshiko Tasaki
- Platform(s): Nintendo Entertainment System
- Release: JP: September 28, 1990; NA: March 1991; EU: 1991
- Genre(s): Action, platformer
- Mode(s): Single-player

Totally Rad, known in Japan as Magic John (マジック・ジョン, Majikku Jon), is an action-adventure game developed by Aicom and published by Jaleco for the Nintendo Entertainment System. The game was released in Japan on September 28, 1990, in North America in March 1991, and in Europe the same year.

== Gameplay ==
- Multiple boss fights ranging in complexity
- Special summoning abilities
- Side-scrolling platform game

== Plot ==
Jake is using an earth spell to defeat one of the major enemies in the game.

Jake (John in the Japanese version) is hired as an apprentice magician by Zebediah Pong (simply referred to as Pong in the Japanese version). He is training when some strange people attack and kidnap his girlfriend, Allison (Yuu in the Japanese version). Jake goes on a quest to find out where they came from and why they wanted Allison. Afterwards, Jake discovers Allison's kidnapping was a feint to force Allison's father, a renowned scientist, out of hiding. Jake must not only save Allison's father, but ultimately battle an evil king who plans to lead a subterranean army in a battle against the people of Jake's world.

The Japanese and North American versions of the game are mostly the same, except for the characters. In the original Magic John, the main characters are two preadolescent, Japanese-style cartoon friends. In Totally Rad, they are redesigned into becoming two Californian teens who talk in contemporary "surfer" lingo.

Magic John has unlimited continues. The player can run out of lives any number of times, and the only way to get a Game Over is by selecting No on the Continue screen.

In Totally Rad however, the player is limited to three continues -- the fourth time they run out of lives, it cuts straight to the Game Over screen and music.

== Manual ==
The instruction manual for Totally Rad is filled with surfer lingo, in addition to comical picture breaks and comments about the author's "babe" and how attractive she looks in the picture he put of her in the instruction manual.

== Reception ==
Mean Machines magazine gave the game a score of 63 out of 100 giving criticism to the lack of challenge in the first few levels, repetitive action, over simplistic gameplay and concluding “A reasonable game which misses out on brilliance due to over-simplification of the gameplay and unoriginal gameplay.”
