= RoboWarrior =

1987 video game

- Cover art
- Developers: Hudson Soft; EXA Planning
- Publishers: JP: Hudson Soft; NA/EU: Jaleco
- Composer: Takeaki Kunimoto
- Series: Bomberman
- Platforms: Nintendo Entertainment System, MSX
- Release: Nintendo Entertainment System: JP: August 7, 1987; NA: December 1988; EU: November 1989; MSX: JP: March 18, 1988
- Genre: Action
- Mode: Single-player

RoboWarrior (Note: Known in Japan as Bomber King (Japanese: ボンバーキング, Hepburn: Bonbā Kingu)) is an action video game developed by Hudson Soft and EXA Planning for the Nintendo Entertainment System. A follow-up to Bomberman (1985), it was released in Japan on August 7, 1987. Internationally, Jaleco published the game in North America in December 1988 and Europe in November 1989.

The player controls ZED, a cyborg on his mission to protect the planet Altile from the invasion of the Xantho Empire. The objective is to make way through the game's eight levels while overcoming enemies and obstacles. ZED uses his bombs and laser gun to create pathway and eliminate his foes. The player is able to utilize numerous items collected throughout the game, giving ZED additional tools and other beneficial effects.

RoboWarrior was released to mixed reception over its gameplay and difficulty. An MSX port was released in 1988. A sequel, Blaster Master Boy (1991), was developed by Sunsoft for the Game Boy, with the overseas versions localized as part of the Blaster Master series.

== Gameplay ==
ZED deploying his bombs in a level full of enemies and items

RoboWarrior is an action game with a focus on battling enemies and collecting items, similarly to The Legend of Zelda (1986). The player controls a cyborg named Z-Type Earth Defense (ZED). It takes place in the year 2395 on an artificial planet Altile, a colony constructed to help ease Earth's overpopulation. Altile is invaded by an alien race, the Xantho Empire, which takes over its weather-control stations and turns it into a barren wasteland, forcing citizens to flee underground. Sent by Earth in response to a distress call, ZED's mission is to fight the Xanthos and defeat its leader, Xur. In the Japanese version, the protagonist is known as Knight.

ZED is equipped with two types of weaponry, bombs and a laser gun. Two different buttons on the controller correspond to the two weapons. The bombs are automatically set off shortly after being deployed, and their explosion can hurt both the Xanthos and ZED himself. The laser gun rapidly fires bullets that can damage enemies. The bombs are used for clearing out blocks that hinder ZED's path, but are limited in number. They can be resupplied from the Xanthos, who drop bombs upon defeat.

Altile is made up of eight levels known as "Periods". Each Period contains one to three smaller stages. The objective of each stage is to reach the exit at the end while destroying blocks and enemies. To open the exit, the player has to acquire a key hidden under a block nearby. Certain stages also require the player to discover a chalice. If the player fails to secure the chalice, the stage will loop indefinitely until it is found. Throughout the Periods, ZED can access optional stages such as underground areas that hold a stockpile of items, or the Rooms of Idols where ZED can win rewards by bombing statues in correct order.

The player can accumulate numerous items throughout the mission. They are usually acquired by destroying blocks in the levels or purchasing them in shops. The items can be selected and expended through the sub-screen menu that displays all the collected ones. Each item serves to help ZED survive various challenges and situations in the game. For example, in the underground areas, ZED can use either candles or lamps as a light source to reveal the level layout. The candles are more common than the lamps, but they do not last as long and do not provide ZED as much light. In another example, ZED's energy meter functions as his health and decreases over time until its total depletion, which will kill him. It can be prevented by replenishing the meter with energy batteries. Other items include waterproof wellies that let ZED pass through water as well as missiles and super bombs.

Enemies of the Xantho Empire come in a variety of properties. Some are ground-based while others are able to fly. Certain adversaries can transform into other objects that disrupt ZED. Some stages contain bosses that must be defeated to continue. By accumulating enough points for the player's score from fighting enemies, ZED's defense permanently increases. Whenever ZED is killed, he restarts with all of the score and half of his items lost.

== Development and release ==
RoboWarrior is a follow-up to Hudson Soft's Bomberman (1985), and was developed for the Nintendo Entertainment System. It was co-produced by EXA Planning, Aicom's predecessor, and Hudson. RoboWarrior draws elements from Starship Hector (1987), which had a similar main theme and ZED as a secret playable character. The soundtrack was composed by Takeaki Kunimoto.

RoboWarrior was first released in Japan on August 7, 1987 under the title Bomber King. It was the first of the three video games Hudson published under the Marucho Series product line, followed by Faxanadu and Momotarō Densetsu. The international versions were published by Jaleco. It was released in North America in December 1988 and Europe in November 1989. The North American and European versions were made easier than the Japanese version: in Bomber King, the bomb explosion kills ZED in one hit, while in RoboWarrior, it reduces a significant amount of ZED's health but does not kill him instantly. The Japanese version has an exclusive Theme Song mode that displays lyrics for the game's main theme song. Tying to this feature, Hudson Soft hosted a karaoke contest that encouraged players to record their performances of the song and send them to the company, with the winners getting their enactments aired on television. An MSX port was released in Japan on March 18, 1988. This version has a save function for the player's progress.

== Reception and legacy ==
Critics of Computer Entertainer recommended RoboWarrior for its gameplay, finding that it encouraged the player to learn all the available powers and implement them correctly in battle. Mark Caswell from The Games Machine gave it a negative review, finding it tedious due to the repetitive gameplay and level layout. Computer and Video Games' Paul Rand likewise left an unfavorable review for its high difficulty. In the September 18, 1987 issue of Famicom Tsūshin, RoboWarrior debuted on the magazine's Top 30 list at number nine.

In retrospect, Hardcore Gaming 101 called the game "interesting but flawed" due to its frustrating game design, but found it fascinating for taking the concepts of the Bomberman series and inserting them into wildly different environments. A sequel, Bomber King: Scenario 2, was developed by Sunsoft for the Game Boy and released in Japan in 1991. It was localized for overseas release as part of Sunsoft's Blaster Master series, being published as Blaster Master Boy in North America and Blaster Master Jr. in Europe.
