= Hoops (1988 video game) =

- North American cover art
- Developer: Aicom
- Publisher: Jaleco
- Designers: Kenji Nakajima; Hiroshi Kazama
- Composers: Kiyoshi Yokoyama; Dōta Andō; Masaki Nagakura
- Series: Moero!!
- Platform: NES
- Release: JP: November 22, 1988; NA: June 1989; EU: 1989
- Genre: Half-court basketball
- Modes: Single-player, multiplayer

Hoops is an NES basketball video game that was released in 1988 for a Japanese audience and in 1989 for a North American audience. In Japan, the game is known as Moero!! Junior Basket - Two on Two (燃えろ！！ジュニアバスケット ツー オン ツー), which a part of "Moero!!" sports series.

The game is done in a half court style with the player having a choice to disable or enable winners outs. No fouls are called. There is also an around the world mode that allows players to focus on making baskets without worrying about the charging, pushing, and traveling fouls that are found in the standard mode of play. Similar to Double Dribble the game features slow-motion sequences when the player goes for a dunk, though these can be blocked.

== Reception ==
Contemporary reviews were broadly positive. Boy's Life magazine described it as offering "tough one-on-one or two-on-two action". A 1989 review for the Battle Creek Enquirer written by Matt Neapolitan praised the game as "one of the best basketball games" for NES platform.

Retrospective reviews have been more mixed. Writing in 2002, video games historian Andy Slaven described it as "boring with predictable opponent movements". Brett Weiss, writing in 2012, described it as "old fashioned [but] a lot of fun".
