= Shingen Samurai-Fighter =

1988 video game

- Developers: Jaleco; Aicom (PC Engine)
- Publishers: Jaleco; Aicom (PC Engine)
- Composer: Tsukasa Tawada
- Platforms: Arcade, PC Engine
- Release: JP: August 1988
- Genre: Hack and slash
- Modes: Single-player, multiplayer

Shingen Samurai-Fighter, released in Japan as Takeda Shingen (Note: Japanese: 武田信玄, Hepburn: Takeda Shingen), is a 1988 hack and slash video game developed and published by Jaleco for arcades. It was only released in Japan in November 1988. It was ported to the PC Engine in 1989 by Aicom. Hamster Corporation released the game outside Japan for the first time through their Arcade Archives series for the Nintendo Switch and PlayStation 4 in June 2021.

== Gameplay ==
The player controls the daimyo Takeda Shingen and his double (controlled by a second player) who embarks on a journey to defeat rival daimyo Uesugi Kenshin during the battles of Kawanakajima. He wields a katana to defeat enemy soldiers while on his way to reach enemy generals. Numerous power-ups, distinguishable by Chinese characters on them, are available to assist Takeda on his quest. Bonus stages where Takeda shoots down enemies while performing yabusame for extra points are available. At the end of every stage, Takeda defeats enemy soldiers in one-on-one combat.
