= The Mafat Conspiracy =

1990 video game

- North American cover art
- Developer: Aicom
- Publisher: Vic Tokai
- Composer: Toshiko Tasaki
- Series: Golgo 13
- Platform: Nintendo Entertainment System
- Release: NA: June 1990; JP: July 27, 1990
- Genre: Action-adventure
- Mode: Single-player

The Mafat Conspiracy (ゴルゴ13 第二章イカロスの謎, Gorugo Sātīn Dai-Nishou Ikarosu no Nazo; Golgo 13 Episode 2: The Riddle of Icarus) is a Nintendo Entertainment System video game released in 1990. It is the sequel to Golgo 13: Top Secret Episode. It was published by Vic Tokai, which went defunct in 1997.

The Mafat Conspiracy follows professional hitman Golgo 13, who is hired to stop the mysterious terrorist organization Mafat, an organization working to provoke war between the United States and Soviet Union.

== Plot ==
An American weapons satellite has mysteriously fallen out of orbit and crashed in the Alps, and threatening letters have been sent to the leaders of the United States and Soviet Union. The letters are from the mysterious terrorist organization known as the Mafat Revolutionary Group. Mafat plans to extort both the Americans and Soviets by threatening to make all their satellites fall from space. They demand the Soviets hand over their research on electromagnetic waves, and the Americans surrender the USS Los Angeles, a submarine equipped with nuclear warheads.

Professional hitman Golgo 13 is hired by a CIA operative named James to eliminate the leader of Mafat, destroy the Satellite Capture System, and free Dr. Barrows, the inventor of the Satellite Capture System. Golgo is sent to Paris to rescue Barrows. After discovering the Mafat hideout with assistance from a female CIA operative named Sylvia, Golgo infiltrates the hideout, only to run into a mysterious terrorist who calls himself Arm of Mafat. He tells Golgo that Barrows was taken to a different location, and attacks him. Golgo subdues Arm of Mafat, and escapes from the hideout before it self-destructs.

Shortly after escaping, Golgo is confronted by KGB Chief Gerbich, who tries to get Golgo to tell him what the Americans are planning, but to no avail. Gerbich departs, and James arrives with the next assignment. He tells Golgo that Barrows was likely taken to Venice. Golgo and Sylvia head to Venice by car, but are then ambushed by a helicopter piloted by Gerbich. Golgo snipes Gerbich from the car, causing the helicopter to crash with Gerbich inside, killing him instantly.

Golgo meets James at the Piazza San Marco in Venice, where he informs him that a Soviet satellite has crashed in the heart of Moscow, which has put the leaders of both the U.S. and USSR on edge. Golgo meets Sylvia back at his hotel room, where she shares intel with Golgo on Afghan terrorist Ahmad Kahn, who knows the location of Mafat's base. Golgo boards the Orient Express and confronts Kahn. He defeats Kahn, who tells him that Mafat's base is located in Afghanistan, but is killed before he can reveal anything else.

In Afghanistan, Golgo finally discovers and infiltrates the Mafat base, and discovers Dr. Barrows, who reveals himself to be the leader of Mafat. Barrows tells Golgo that he created Mafat to take revenge on both the Americans and Soviets, who dismissed his research. He then activates the base's self-destruct sequence to try and eliminate Golgo, but he narrowly escapes. After escaping, Golgo finds Barrows through his sniper scope and takes him out before he can escape. The United Nations forces then eliminates the remaining Mafat members, and the Satellite Capture System research is taken back by the Americans.

A few days later, a mortally wounded Sylvia arrives at Golgo's hotel room in Istanbul. She tells him that she was shot by James, who has stolen Dr. Barrows' research and is preparing to defect to the USSR. In her final moments, she asks Golgo to take out James before he leaves Turkey, even though she has no way to pay Golgo for the hit. Golgo accepts her request, and she dies shortly after. Golgo arrives at Atatürk Airport and discovers James as he is about to board the plane to Moscow. He kills him, then departs the scene as the research documents are scattered everywhere.

== Gameplay ==
Golgo 13 takes aim.

The action in this game takes place on five different types of screens: a timed horizontally scrolling screen, a timed stationary screen, a timed 3-D Honda NSX action screen, a 3-D maze screen, and a sniper screen. The horizontally scrolling stages pit Golgo against enemies armed with pistols, machine guns, scythes, boomerangs, grenades, and knives. Golgo will also face scorpions and dogs. Golgo is armed with a gun and can pick up ammo along the way. He can also kick enemies.

The stationary screens let the player punch and kick the enemies, which include Arm of Mafat, who is inside the Mafat hideout, Bodyguard, who protects Ahmad Khan, and Canine, who awaits Golgo at the Mafat base. In addition to fighting enemies in the scrolling and stationary levels, Golgo will also do a lot of running and jumping.

In the car, Golgo can change gears and throw hand grenades at KGB vehicles.

In the mazes, Golgo can fire upon pistol-shooting, grenade-throwing and machine gun-toting enemies while exploring the various hallways and rooms. Golgo can also find an infrared scope that allows night vision.

The sniper screen, which makes use of Golgo's experience as a hitman, features a close-up of him aiming a sniper rifle and in the background a close-up of the target site. When he is aiming the sniper rifle and preparing to fire, the wind speed and direction should be taken into consideration.

Throughout this game, CIA operatives James and Sylvia will provide Golgo with information on enemies and the location of Dr. Barrows, along with providing the necessary weapons.

== Reception ==
Reception

Review score
| Publication | Score |
|---|---|
| Electronic Gaming Monthly | 7/10, 9/10, 7/10, 7/10 |
