= Blaster Master Zero 2 =

2019 video game

- Developer: Inti Creates
- Publisher: Inti Creates
- Director: Satoru Nishizawa
- Producer: Takuya Aizu
- Designers: Tomokazu Ohnishi; Mio Yamaguchi
- Programmer: Ryoto Nakayama
- Artists: Yuji Natsume; Shin Nakamura
- Writer: Masato Okudaira
- Composers: Ippo Yamada; Hiroaki Sano; Aoi Tanaka; Kotaro Yamada
- Series: Blaster Master
- Platforms: Nintendo Switch; Windows; PlayStation 4; Xbox One; Xbox Series X/S
- Release: Switch: WW: March 20, 2019; JP: March 21, 2019; Windows: WW: November 29, 2019; PlayStation 4: WW: June 29, 2020; Xbox One, Series X/S: WW: July 15, 2021
- Genres: Action, Metroidvania
- Modes: Single-player, multiplayer

Blaster Master Zero 2 is a platform video game developed and published by Inti Creates. It was released in March 2019 for the Nintendo Switch, in November 2019 for Windows, and in June 2020 for PlayStation 4. Versions for the Xbox One and Xbox Series X/S were released on July 15, 2021. The game is a sequel to the Blaster Master Zero, which was a remake of Sunsoft's Blaster Master for the Nintendo Entertainment System. A sequel, Blaster Master Zero 3, was released in 2021.

== Gameplay ==
The game plays similarly to the previous game. Players control the SOPHIA vehicle in the side-scrolling levels, exploring environments and defeating enemies using the tank's various weapons. The player character Jason can also hop out of the tank to enter various passages and doors, where the view switches to an overhead perspective. Players can find various upgrades to the tank that may allow access to previously inaccessible areas. Throughout the game the player also encounters various boss characters that must be defeated to progress to later levels.

The levels of Blaster Master Zero 2 are now separated into a world map. Each sector consists of a single planet with an interconnected overworld similar to that of the previous game, though smaller in scale. There are also several planetoids which are unlocked by collecting map items. Though optional, the planetoids contain small levels where Jason can obtain new upgrades for G-SOPHIA and himself.

Jason's new vehicle, the G-SOPHIA, is functionally identical to its predecessor SOPHIA III, but has a new GAIA-System feature that allows it to recharge its subweapon energy from concussive impacts, like that of long falls or enemy attacks. If its subweapon energy is fully depleted, it will be severely weakened in power until it recharges. Jason is also given a new Blast Counter technique when in the overhead areas, which lets him immediately shoot or dash into enemies when crosshairs appear on them before they attack. Both Jason and G-SOPHIA are given new and different weapons from that of the previous game.

== Plot ==
The storyline continues several months after the events of Blaster Master Zero, in which a young inventor on Earth named Jason Frudnick encountered a frog-like creature which he named Fred. He was led underground by Fred to SOPHIA III, an armored tank known as a Metal Attacker. It was owned by the android girl Eve, who had traveled from the planet Sophia to destroy the evil Mutants, alien invaders that seek to consume planets and assimilate the native lifeforms. Together, Jason and Eve destroyed the Mutants and their Overlord, but the Overlord's core had infected Eve and SOPHIA III, forcing Jason to destroy the contaminated vehicle in order to save her.

In the months that follow, Jason creates GAIA-SOPHIA (G-SOPHIA), a new and improved version of SOPHIA III capable of space travel but the remaining Mutant cells in Eve's body have multiplied and are threatening to destroy her. Unable to find a cure on Earth, Jason, Eve, and Fred travel to Sophia to seek medical attention.

Their journey to Sophia takes them through several planets along the way, each protected by its own Metal Attacker, pilot, and support android. Jason assists and befriends them, and is given special emblems as tokens of their meeting. He is also attacked multiple times by Leibniz, a vengeful Metal Attacker pilot who tries to convince him that Eve should be left to die, seeing the androids as "useless dolls" after losing his own partner Lucia in battle.

As they approach the last sector, Jason and Eve discover an enormous planet-sized Mutant who guards the dimensional tunnel to Sophia within its surface. Using G-SOPHIA, Jason is able to drain the energy from this enormous mutant and destroy it. This causes a chain reaction that pulls the G-SOPHIA and its crew into a dimensional rift, scattering them in the process. If all the emblems are not collected, the game ends prematurely at this point.

If all the emblems are collected, Eve recovers and sets out alone to find Jason through the barren landscape, becoming the player character from this point on. In her search, she is attacked by Leibniz but ignores him as she finds an abandoned Metal Attacker dubbed ANDREIA. The ghost of its support android, Elfie, appears and tells Leibniz that he shouldn't blame Eve for what happened to Lucia. Conflicted, Leibniz shares with Eve that the emblems are tracking beacons and leaves, and Elfie gives Eve control of ANDREIA to help her find Jason.

Eve locates Fred and has him track Jason and G-SOPHIA, both having been turned to stone by a giant Mutant in a cocoon named Drolrevo. The emblems are activated and summons the other Metal Attackers from earlier in the journey, who assist Eve by distracting Drolrevo as she charges up ANDREIA's Acceleration Blast and fires it at the Mutant's cocoon. The blast destroys the cocoon, inadvertently heals Eve of her infection, and frees Jason and G-SOPHIA, allowing him to finish off Drolrevo as his true form emerges.

After leaving the dimensional rift and saying goodbye to their friends, Jason and Eve arrive at Sophia and share their feelings for each other. Meanwhile, Mutants have invaded Earth in Jason's absence, and Leibniz is enjoying the irony that he is going to be the hero instead of Jason as he flies into battle.

== Development ==
Developer Inti Creates was the team who created Blaster Master Zero, a reboot of the 1988 Sunsoft game Blaster Master. They went to work producing a sequel, using experienced staff from this game to finish development in nearly one year.

== Release ==
Blaster Master Zero 2 was released on March 20, 2019 for the Nintendo Switch and on November 29 for Windows. It was ported to the PlayStation 4 on June 29, 2020. Versions for the Xbox One and Xbox Series X/S were released on July 15, 2021.

== Reception ==
Reception

Aggregate scores
Aggregator	Score
Metacritic	NS: 85/100
OpenCritic	92% recommend

Review scores
Publication	Score
Destructoid	8/10
Nintendo Life	9/10
Nintendo World Report	9/10

The game received "generally favorably reviews" on Nintendo Switch according to review aggregator website Metacritic. Fellow review aggregator OpenCritic assessed that the game received strong approval, being recommended by 92% of critics.

Mitch Vogel of Nintendo Life rated the game 9/10, calling it a "masterclass in retro game design". He stated that while "few could’ve predicted the surprise release of an original sequel", it exceeded its predecessor in every way, and praised the game's addition of a limited open-world. He also praised the addition of counterattacks to top-down shooting segments that increase the degree of skill-based play required and allow the difficulty to go much higher while still being fair.

Perry Burkum of Nintendo World Report also rated the game 9/10, saying that it "does everything you’d hope the next entry would provide to fans of the series". Calling the game a "ton of fun", he goes on to state that the "very nature of what makes Blaster Master gameplay so excellent has never shone so bright and wonderful". He slightly criticized the counter mechanic, saying that it could feel "janky".

Peter Glagowski of Destructoid rated the game 8/10, calling it a "clear improvement on its predecessor". Stating that most aspects, such as the graphics, story and soundtrack, were superior, he called the game "well worth exploring for fans of Inti Creates and Blaster Master".
