= Worlds of Power =

Video game themed book series

- The complete Worlds of Power series
- Country: USA
- Language: English
- Genre: various
- Publisher: Scholastic

The Worlds of Power books are a series of novelizations of video games for the Nintendo Entertainment System released in the early 1990s by Scholastic. The series was created by Seth Godin and takes creative liberties with their source material. They usually include game hints written upside down at the end of chapters (some also had a tear-out "trading card" in the middle with a tip in mirror writing on the back) and are written in a simplistic, easy-to-read style.

== Books in the series ==
Books in the series consist of novelizations of:

1. Blaster Master by A. L. Singer
2. Metal Gear by Alexander Frost
3. Ninja Gaiden by A. L. Singer
4. Castlevania II: Simon's Quest by Christopher Howell
5. Wizards and Warriors by Ellen Miles
6. Bionic Commando by Judith Bauer Stamper
7. Infiltrator by A. L. Singer
8. Before Shadowgate by Ellen Miles

Junior Edition Books:

- Mega Man 2 by Ellen Miles
- Bases Loaded II: Second Season by A. L. Singer

== Production ==
The producer of the series, Seth Godin, used the pen name "F.X. Nine". Godin said one day that when he talked to his nephew he discovered that the boy did not read for pleasure. Instead the boy played NES games. Godin decided to create books that appealed to children who played video games. Godin, the head of a book packaging company, created the series idea, selected games to novelize, found writers for the books, and contacted the publisher for approval. Nintendo negotiated with Godin but negotiations failed. The other video game creators successfully negotiated and Scholastic Books approved the project. 1Up.com described Godin's role in publishing as similar to that of a film producer in the film industry.

The video game companies did not assist Godin as they were too busy. Godin set the production schedule, selected the video games, and selected the authors. Then he set to create one 40-page "bible" for each game outlining the plot, characters, and level layouts to assist the authors' creation of the dialog and narratives. 1Up.com stated that assembling the bibles was "quite a challenge". Godin and the authors played through the games without strategy guides in order to reverse-engineer the stories. All of the books were indexed by Godin's pen name; Godin said that he chose the pen name due to the way bookstores arrange books as children looking for books related to Nintendo would see Godin's books indexed by the letters "n-i-n". Godin said that his most serious frustration was playing video games for too long, as he would experience headaches. He added that the success of the Worlds of Power series outweighed the drawbacks; around one million copies of the books were sold. 1Up.com added that this was "especially remarkable" as the target audience, young boys, were not considered to be a large market for book series. Godin said: "We sold a million copies to kids that may not have read for fun before. That's a huge success (and) a home run!"

One author, Peter Lerangis, used the pen name "A.L. Singer" and wrote the novelizations of Bases Loaded II: Second Season, Blaster Master, Infiltrator, and Ninja Gaiden. Godin approached Lerangis when the project began and asked Lerangis to be a writer for the project. Lerangis, who admitted a lack of skill in playing video games, took the offer. Lerangis wrote each book in about four weeks. One of Lerangis's two favorite books, Ninja Gaiden, was one of the most popular books in the Worlds of Power series. He liked writing the book since he "was able to get into the character's head pretty quickly", especially while writing the beginning. Lerangis said that the book reveals Ryu's father to be alive at the end since he and Godin believed that the revised ending was consistent with the Worlds of Power character and as real-life fathers they felt reluctance to leave Ryu without a father. Bases Loaded II: Second Season, Lerangis's other favorite title, is considered to be more obscure. Lerangis liked baseball and, since the game had no plot, he created an original light comedy storyline; Lerangis said that Bases Loaded was the most fun book to write. Lerangis described Blaster Master as the most difficult book to write; since the game does not have a strong middle plot, Lerangis fleshed out the story and connected the beginning and ending of the game.

Godin said that he would have liked to novelize the game Myst, a personal computer game, into a book. He said that "I think that stories never go out of style. I think we need a series like this now more than ever & kids need to learn the habit of reading" and that "I think the lesson of each book was that there is a hero in everyone. You just have to set it free".

=== Editing of video game stories ===
The Worlds of Power series omitted violent elements in the video games. Video game covers were adapted into the book covers after weaponry was omitted. For instance in Ninja Gaiden's cover, the dagger that Ryu Hayabusa held in front of him is no longer visible. In Metal Gear's cover, Solid Snake no longer holds his gun; 1Up.com's Scott Sharkey said that without the gun, Snake was "making a vaguely masturbatory gesture". Within the texts, death and violence were not inflicted on humans. In the Blaster Master book, the bosses appearing like mutated animals are holographic projections placed on formless blobs. In the Metal Gear book, Snake—described as a "walking arsenal"—uses his guns only to pistol whip enemies. In the Ninja Gaiden book, Ryu Hayabusa's father—seemingly killed in the prologue of the game and said to be dead in earlier book chapters—is revealed as alive by the end of the book. In the Infiltrator book, an agent scheduled to be "voided" either has his memory wiped clean, receives exiling, or receives a demotion. In Bionic Commando, the protagonist's gun shoots "stun bullets" and the protagonist uses karate chops to disable enemies. Towards the end of that book, a clone of Adolf Hitler kills the enemy leader; the protagonist feels no sympathy since the leader was, as stated by 1Up.com, "an evil man being eliminated by an even more evil man".

Godin described the editing as "stylistic in nature" and that he intended to "minimize the death" in the adapted games. He added that Scholastic asked him to remove witchcraft several years before the release of Harry Potter's first book, Harry Potter and the Sorcerer's Stone (Harry Potter and the Philosopher's Stone in the United Kingdom), which was published by Scholastic in the United States.

== Legacy ==
The PlayStation game Blaster Master: Blasting Again, a sequel to the original Blaster Master, adapted some of the original elements from Peter Lerangis' novelization of Blaster Master, particularly the character Eve, who was written specifically for the book. Lerangis stated that he felt "honored" for the privilege. This change was carried over to Blaster Master Zero in 2017.
