= Black Black =

Japanese brand of chewing gum

- Product type: Chewing gum
- Current owner: Lotte Confectionery
- Country: Japan
- Introduced: 1983
- Website: http://www.lotte.co.jp/

Black Black (ブラックブラック, Burakku Burakku) is a brand of caffeinated chewing gum produced in Japan by Lotte that has been sold since 1983. It is popular in Japan, partially due to its television commercials that star Jean-Claude Van Damme. After being mentioned by Wired in 2003, which described its effect as "Sambuca spiked with Vicks VapoRub", Lotte Black Black became popular in the United States. The gum's name is derived from its charcoal-like color.

Ingredients include sugar, starch syrup, grape sugar, erythritol, oolong tea extract, ginkgo extract, chrysanthemum flower extract, gum base, flavorings, coloring agents (cacao, gardenia), caffeine, and nicotinamide. A persistent urban legend holds that the gum contains nicotine, the misconception stemming from confusion with nicotinamide, a different substance related to B vitamins.
