= Blaster Master 2 =

1993 video game

- Developer: Software Creations
- Publisher: Sunsoft
- Composer: Tony Williams
- Series: Blaster Master
- Platform: Sega Genesis
- Release: NA: June 1993
- Genre: Run and gun
- Mode: Single-player

Blaster Master 2 is a 1993 run and gun video game developed by Software Creations and published by Sunsoft for the Sega Genesis. The game is a sequel to the original Blaster Master for the Nintendo Entertainment System (NES), and was released specifically for the North American market following the first game's success in that region. The staff of the original Japanese version of Blaster Master, titled Chô Wakusei Senki Metafight, had nothing to do with Blaster Master 2, and Sunsoft Japan did not release the game in Japan. It was reported as being in development for the Super NES in the March 1992 issue of Nintendo Power. The game was also mentioned in August 1992 issue of Nintendo Power, but they stated that it was not close to completion.

== Plot ==
The game takes place four years after Jason's encounter with the Plutonium Boss and the radioactive mutants under the Earth. His only reminder of the incident is S.O.P.H.I.A., the vehicle he used to stop them, which he has hidden in an abandoned barn. One day, one bolt of lightning struck the house and caused the ceiling to crumble, knocking Jason unconscious. When Jason woke up, S.O.P.H.I.A. was in pieces and the parts he had collected from his first dealings with the Mutant Bosses were missing. Little does Jason know that there are more lightning beings where the first one came from and they are planning to destroy the Earth. The beings started digging towards the Earth's core in order to shift the planet's weight off its axis, leading to total annihilation. The parts from SOPHIA are being used to create a robotic army to assist the being in accomplishing their mission. Now, Jason must stop them, but he won't make it without the help of SOPHIA. Since he can't recover the parts, he decided to redesign it to better prepare himself for the ordeal facing him. After 29 days, SOPHIA was completely rebuilt and ready for battle. Remembering where he saw the being's footsteps, Jason jumped in his vehicle and headed towards the mountains where the challenge begins.

=== Characters ===
Jason Frudnick - He is the protagonist throughout the Blaster Master series. He is the character that accidentally discovered SOPHIA while trying to retrieve his pet frog Fred. In Blaster Master 2, Jason is young (age 19) and couldn't have been more prepared for battle. His job is to eliminate the Plutonium Boss once and for all. Jason's equipment is fairly simple in Blaster Master 2. He is wearing body armor that has moderate protection from heat and impact. Jason also comes with his usual blast cannon that is equipped onto his left arm brace. It does not overheat, and has unlimited energy. In Blaster Master 2, Jason is mostly seen inside SOPHIA's canopy, but can easily hop out at any time in the game when in the sidescroll view. Jason does not take impact from falling too well in BM2, but when in the "Jason view" he does not take damage from falling impact. Jason is more easily seen in detail when challenging a boss or even an underboss. He is approximately ten times larger in this view.

S.O.P.H.I.A. (sometimes referred to as SOPHIA) - The robotic, combat tank-like vehicle used throughout the Blaster Master series. SOPHIA comes in many different models, and the one that is seen in Blaster Master 2 is SOPHIA 4th (2000). The model has been rebuilt by Jason and has many new and helpful features from the previous models of SOPHIA (SOPHIA Nora MA-01, SOPHIA Nora MA-02).

== Gameplay ==
Under the development team of Software Creations and the marketing team at Sunsoft of America, several things were altered in the new Blaster Master 2 game, such as the name of the vehicle (now "S.O.P.H.I.A."), as well as significantly expanded gameplay. There are now 8 levels to play through, and each level containing a power-up or new obtainable weapon in which Jason or SOPHIA can use throughout the game. The platform-jumping characteristics that made the original NES game so popular among fans were preserved, while other viewpoints provided an additional level of gameplay unique to BM2 alone. There were now three ways to play: sidescroll view (S.O.P.H.I.A. and Jason), overhead view (S.O.P.H.I.A.), and Jason running through rooms (with a large view, and a small view with Jason running through certain parts of the stages).

=== Sidescroll view ===
Normal view of SOPHIA

In the sidescroll view, players battled through levels just like in Blaster Master, except in 16-bit graphics. Jason could get powerups such as homing missile, three-way missiles, bubble shield, and lightning spread.

=== Overhead view ===
Overhead view of SOPHIA

In the overhead view, S.O.P.H.I.A. can not use upgrades, but instead could rotate the turret 360 degrees while the player runs through obstacles and gunfire. S.O.P.H.I.A. rotates her turret differently than when in the sidescroll view. A tap of the B and C buttons on the Genesis controller will rotate left and right.

=== Jason view ===
Large view of Jason

During the course of the game, Jason could enter several rooms, one of which may contain a mini-boss (such as a giant bee or worm) that he must fight in order to gain a powerup or key that will let him enter the next stage. Sometimes these mini-bosses will give Jason or S.O.P.H.I.A. a powerup that enhances their abilities. For example, Jason can get a jetpack, or missile launcher. S.O.P.H.I.A. can get a hover module, or a drill that can break through stone.

== Reviews ==
Reception

Aggregate score
Aggregator	Score
GameRankings	46.67%(3 reviews)

Review scores
Publication	Score
MegaTech	81%
Power Unlimited	73/100

Electronic Gaming Monthly scored the game 7 out of 10. Their four reviewers were divided about the game; one hailed it as having "better graphics, better sounds, and better play" than the original Blaster Master, one expressed disappointment over the removal of some of the original's power-ups but judged it an overall solid sequel, and the remaining two felt the game to be merely average. Power Unlimited gave the game a score of 73% writing: "The graphics and sounds of Masterblaster 2 are both very good, but something is missing in this game. It is very unoriginal. So not really recommended.
