= Blaster Master Zero 3 =

- Developer: Inti Creates
- Publisher: Inti Creates
- Series: Blaster Master
- Platforms: Nintendo Switch; PlayStation 4; Windows
- Release: 29 July 2021
- Genre: Platformer

Blaster Master Zero 3 (Note: Japanese: ブラスターマスター ゼロ ３) is a 2021 platformer developed by Inti Creates. It is the third and final game in the Blaster Master Zero series. The game was released on 29 July 2021 for Nintendo Switch, PlayStation 4, and Windows.

== Gameplay ==
Blaster Master Zero 3 is a platformer with Metroidvania elements. Like the previous Blaster Master games, it consists of 2d side-scrolling platforming sections and top-down shooter action sections.

== Development and release ==
Blaster Master Zero 3 was released on 29 July 2021 for Nintendo Switch, PlayStation 4, and Windows. The game was also included in the compilation Blaster Master Zero: MetaFight Chronicle, which bundled the game with Blaster Master Zero and Blaster Master Zero 2. The compilation was also released on 29 July for Nintendo Switch and PlayStation 4.

== Reception ==
Reception

Aggregate scores
Aggregator	Score
Metacritic	NS: 80/100
OpenCritic	86%

Blaster Master Zero 3 received "generally favorably" reviews according to review aggregator platform Metacritic. 86% of the critics recommended the game according to OpenCritic.
