= The Astyanax =

1989 video game

- Arcade flyer
- Developer: Aicom
- Publisher: Jaleco
- Director: Tokuhiro Takemori
- Producer: Tokuhiro Takemori
- Designer: Tokuhiro Takemori
- Composers: Kiyoshi Yokoyama; Toshiko Tasaki (NES)
- Platforms: Arcade, NES
- Release: Arcade; 1989; NES: JP: December 21, 1989; NA: March 8, 1990; EU: 1990
- Genre: Platform
- Modes: Single-player, multiplayer
- Arcade system: Jaleco Mega System 1A

The Astyanax, known in Japan as The Lord of King (Note: Japanese: ザ・ロードオブキング, Hepburn: Za Rōdō Bu Kingu), is a 1989 platform video game developed by Aicom and released for arcades by Jaleco. A port to the Nintendo Entertainment System, simply titled Astyanax, was released in 1989 in Japan and in Western regions in 1990, shortly after the arcade version, but is decidedly different from its arcade predecessor in terms of story. Hamster Corporation released the game as part of their Arcade Archives series for the Nintendo Switch and PlayStation 4 in May 2021.

== Gameplay ==
=== Arcade version ===
Screenshot of the arcade version

The arcade version of Astyanax is set in a fantasy world populated by mythical creatures from Greek and Arab mythology. The game consists of six stages: a forest, a cave, a lake, a lift, a castle and the final battle. Up to two players can play simultaneously with continues allowed at any moment. The first player controls Roche (a blond-haired warrior in blue armor), while the second player controls an unnamed palette swap of Roche in red armor with black hair. The controls consist of an eight-way joystick and three buttons for attacking, jumping or using a thunder attack that covers the whole screen. The player has four health points per life.

The player's main weapon is an axe, with a power gauge that fills automatically when the player is not swinging it. When the gauge is filled, the player's axe will be lit on fire, allowing for a stronger attack. This allows the player a choice between faster weak swings or a slow strong one.

The player can obtain power-ups by destroying stone pillars such as crystals for points or red jewels for additional health. There is also a blue arrowhead that increases the strength of the player's thunder attack by up to four levels (the player must have at least one arrowhead in stock to perform a thunder attack) and a shield that allows the player to block enemy attacks until it breaks.

=== NES ===
Unlike the arcade version, the NES version can only be played by one player, who controls Astyanax. Like in the arcade version, the player has a life gauge, a strength gauge that fills automatically when Astyanax is not attacking, and a magic gauge for his spells. Also unlike the arcade version, the player can wield other weapons besides the default axe, as well as use different magic spells, which are selected by pausing the game.

By picking up a power-up, Astyanax's weapon, the Bash, changes shape from its default axe form into a spear, which can be upgraded again into a sword. The spear has the weakest attack strength, but allows Astyanax to use his magic spells more often by consuming less magic points, while the sword can deal the most damage to enemies, but consumes the most magic points when casting a spell. The player will revert to the previous weapon after losing a life.

The player's magic spells consist of a binding spell that temporarily freezes all enemies for a few seconds, a fire blast spell that damages all enemies within range and a thunderbolt spell that damages every enemy on-screen. Each spell consumes a different number of magic points, with the binding spell consuming the fewest points, while the thunderbolt consumes the most.

Other power-ups include a power supply that extends the length of Astyanax's power gauge (allowing for stronger axe swings), a wing that increases the refill speed of Astyanax's power gauge, potions that restore the player's health and magic and extra lives. Astyanax can also encounter Cutie throughout certain stages, who will offer to either change Astyanax's weapon or refill his magic points.

== Plot ==
=== Arcade ===
A long time ago, an ugly battle was being waged every day as the world was ruled by demons. The people trembled with fear, with nobody to stand up for them, until one day, a brave young man received a divine revelation from God and was granted the mythical Fire Axe. His name is Roche. Giving the people courage again, Roche embarks on a journey to the Castle of Algerine in order to defeat the demon overlord Argos and restore peace to the world.

=== NES ===
Astyanax is a 16-year-old student from Greenview High School who has been having a recurring dream in which a young woman is calling out for his name. One day, while on his way to class, Astyanax is suddenly transported into another dimension. Astyanax meets the fairy Cutie, who explains that he is in the kingdom of Remlia (either a possible mistranslation of Lemuria, or a pun on the sleep phase REM) and has been summoned to rescue its ruler, Princess Rosebud, who is being held captive by the evil wizard Blackhorn. Armed with the legendary axe Bash, Astyanax sets out on a journey to Blackhorn's lair with Cutie in order to rescue Rosebud. In Blackhorn's castle they fall into a trap and Cutie sacrifices her life to allow Astyanax to fight onward alone. Right before the final battle with Blackthorn, Rosebud warns Astyanax of Blackthorn's true identity, that he is Remlia's evil version of Astyanax. He eventually destroys Blackhorn, and is transported back to Earth by Rosebud. Astyanax wonders if he dreamed his entire adventure until he sees Cutie, who has been reborn as a human. As they embrace, he sees a vision of Rosebud saying this is a reward for their bravery.

== Reception ==
Reception

Review score
Publication	Score
Electronic Gaming Monthly	5/10, 4/10, 5/10, 5/10 (NES)

In Japan, Game Machine listed The Astyanax on their January 15, 1990 issue as being the twentieth most-successful table arcade unit of the month.
