= Blaster Master Boy =

1991 video game

- European cover art
- Developer: Aicom
- Publisher: Sunsoft
- Director: Akito Takeuchi
- Producer: Kiharu Yoshida
- Designer: Shigeyuki Asa
- Programmer: Michio Okasaka
- Composer: Shinichi Seya
- Series: Bomberman; Blaster Master
- Platform: Game Boy
- Release: EU: 1991; NA: February 1992; JP: August 23, 1991
- Genre: Action
- Mode: Single-player

Blaster Master Boy (Note: Known in Japan as Bomber King: Scenario 2 (ボンバーキング シナリオ2) and in Europe as Blaster Master Jr.) in Europe and in Japan, is an action video game developed by Aicom and published by Sunsoft. The game was released in 1991 for the Game Boy.

== Gameplay and premise ==
Players control Jason, the protagonist of Blaster Master, with his car Sophia not present. Players have various abilities, including making Jason fire a gun and plant bombs that can be used to damage enemies and environment. Players will encounter power-ups that will allow Jason to clear obstacles and get stronger and transform himself three times with new pieces of armor and change his appearance to different battle armor. Players can also upgrade their weapons with other power-ups. Each stage features an exit that requires a key and a boss behind that exit.

== Development and release ==
It is a sequel to Robowarrior, a spin-off title in the Bomberman series by Hudson Soft. However, the game was marketed in western territories as a game in the Blaster Master series by Sunsoft. Aside from the title change, the game is the same in all regions.

== Reception ==
Hardcore Gaming 101 felt that the game was decent for a Game Boy title, but that they would not replay it due to being unremarkable. They speculated that the name change was due to a similarity between Blaster Master's overhead stages and these.
