= Blaster Master Zero =

2017 action adventure video game

- Developer: Inti Creates
- Publisher: Inti Creates
- Director: Satoru Nishizawa
- Producer: Takuya Aizu
- Designers: Tomokazu Ohnishi; Mio Yamaguchi
- Programmer: Ryoto Nakayama
- Artists: Yuji Natsume; Hidemi Ohnishi; Shin Nakamura
- Writer: Masato Okudaira
- Composers: Ippo Yamada; Hiroaki Sano; Aoi Tanaka; Kotaro Yamada
- Series: Blaster Master
- Platforms: Nintendo 3DS; Nintendo Switch; Windows; PlayStation 4; Xbox One; Xbox Series X/S
- Release: Nintendo 3DS, Switch: JP: March 3, 2017; WW: March 9, 2017; Windows: WW: June 14, 2019; PlayStation 4: WW: June 29, 2020; Xbox One, Series X/S: WW: July 1, 2021
- Genre: Action-adventure
- Modes: Single-player, multiplayer

Blaster Master Zero is a 2017 action-adventure platform video game developed and published by Inti Creates for the Nintendo 3DS and Nintendo Switch. The game is the second reboot of Sunsoft's Blaster Master for the Nintendo Entertainment System (NES) and was released worldwide in March 2017. It was subsequently ported to Windows in June 2019, PlayStation 4 in June 2020 and Xbox One and Xbox Series X/S in July 2021. As in the NES original, the game's plot centers around Jason Frudnick, a young man who descends into a subterranean world to rescue a frog creature named Fred. Players control Jason behind the wheel of a tank vehicle called SOPHIA, exploring large environments and defeating various mutant enemies. Jason can also exit the tank to explore various areas into which the tank cannot venture. In addition to redone graphics and sound, Blaster Master Zero also adds various tweaks and features not seen in the NES game. A sequel, Blaster Master Zero 2, was released in 2019 with a third game Blaster Master Zero 3 in 2021.

== Gameplay ==
The game plays similarly to the NES original. Players control the SOPHIA vehicle in the side-scrolling levels, exploring environments and defeating enemies using the tank's various weapons. The player character Jason can also hop out of the tank to enter various passages and doors, where the view switches to an overhead perspective. Players can find various upgrades to the tank that may allow access to previously inaccessible areas. Throughout the game the player also encounters various boss characters that must be defeated to progress to later levels. A multiplayer mode allows a second player to take control of an aiming reticle to shoot at enemies.

== Plot and setting ==
The game serves as a sequel to Chō Wakusei Senki: Metafight, the original Japanese version of Blaster Master, as well as a reboot of the American plot, combining plot elements and character names from Metafight with Blaster Master and its Worlds of Power novelization.

In a distant future, Earth falls into an ice age, after countless wars and environmental disasters. Due to the ice age, the human race was forced to live underground. When the ice age came to an end, humanity began making methods they learned while living underground to restore the planet and the environment. During that time, a large, mysterious comet fell to the Earth, but that did not hinder their effort to restore the lost ecosystems, and humans were able to live on the Earth's surface once again.

Several hundred years later, Jason Frudnick, a young genius in the field of robotics, finds an unusual-looking and frog-like creature that he names Fred. His research is interrupted when Fred escapes into a wormhole that seemed to appear from nowhere, and Jason finds himself inside one of the underground environments from the past, where he encounters an armored tank named SOPHIA III, which he proceeds to use in order to fend off against the mutants that suddenly took over the underground and locate Fred.

During his quest, Jason finds an unconscious girl named Eve, who has a strange connection to SOPHIA III. Together, they find and rescue Fred, whereupon Jason finds out that both Eve and Fred are actually aliens. Fred is a probe sent by the inhabitants of Eve's planet to locate the Mutants, who are alien invaders that once attempted to conquer her planet, whereas Eve is an android created to serve as pilot and support of SOPHIA III. Together, they defeat the Underworld Lord, who was the leader of the Mutants.

In the basic ending, Eve thanks Jason and leaves Earth with the tank and, unbeknownst to Jason, somberly destroys herself along with it. If the player has collected all of SOPHIA III's weapon and upgrade chips, and all of the area maps, then an extended ending is unlocked. After the battle, Eve knocks Jason unconscious and leaves with SOPHIA III to defeat the true leader of the Mutants, the Mutant Core, alone. Fred uses his ability to create wormholes to take Jason to a base where he finds a new tank, the SOPHIA ZERO, a far more powerful version of the SOPHIA III.

Eventually, Jason finds the Mutant Core, which has taken over and corrupted the SOPHIA III with Eve trapped inside of it. Jason fights and disables the corrupted SOPHIA III long enough to rescue Eve and destroys the SOPHIA III and the Mutant Core along with it. In the end, Eve finds out that SOPHIA ZERO was created for her by Kane and Jennifer Gardner, Eve's parents/creators. Eve is truly thankful for Jason, who saved both her and the planet. The game ends with Jason watching the scenery, now filled with greenery, with Eve and Fred perched atop of SOPHIA ZERO.

== Development ==
Two months after the game's release, Inti Creates released a patch for the game that added a new "Destroyer Mode", a harder difficulty setting available after players beat the game. They also announced the release of two DLC characters, Gunvolt from the company's Azure Striker Gunvolt and Ekoro from Gal*Gun, another Inti Creates title. Guest characters Shantae and Shovel Knight were subsequently announced in July. An update released in October 2017 added a boss rush game mode.

=== Release ===
Blaster Master Zero was released as a digital-only title for the Nintendo 3DS and Nintendo Switch on March 3, 2017, in Japan, and on March 9, 2017, in North America and Europe. The game was later ported to Windows in June 2019 and PlayStation 4 in June 2020. Versions for the Xbox One and Xbox Series X/S were released on July 1, 2021.

== Reception ==
Reception

Aggregate scores
Aggregator	Score
Metacritic	(NS) 78/100 (3DS) 70/100
OpenCritic	74% recommend

Review scores
Publication	Score
Destructoid	8/10
IGN	7/10
Nintendo Life	8/10

The game has received largely positive reviews. It received praise for its retro art style and being largely faithful to the original game, with Destructoid calling it "a loving recreation that serves as both a companion and in some ways a replacement for the original". However, the game was also criticized for not improving enough over the original as well as being too easy. IGN's Tristan Ogilvie commented that the game "never offers an old-school level of adversity to match its charmingly chunky 8-bit aesthetic", while Game Informer called it "a blast from the past that feels like a bit of a relic". By October 2017, Inti Creates reported over 110,000 sales for the game.

A sequel, Blaster Master Zero 2, was released for Nintendo Switch in March 2019; for Windows in November 2019; for PlayStation 4 in June 2020; and for the Xbox One and Xbox Series X/S in July 2021.

The final game in the Blaster Master Zero trilogy, Blaster Master Zero 3, was released for Nintendo Switch, PlayStation 4, Windows, Xbox One, and Xbox Series X/S on July 29, 2021.
