= Master Blasters =

- Created by: Bradley Anderson; Mack Anderson
- Starring: Dan Stroud; Terry Stroud; Byrl Armel
- Country of origin: United States
- Original language: English

Production
- Executive producers: Bradley Anderson; Mack Anderson
- Running time: 60 minutes

Original release
- Release: July 27, 2005 – April 9, 2008

Master Blasters is an American game show that debuted on July 27, 2005. A team of challengers competes against the home team, the Master Blasters, each week to construct rocket-based machines in a timed competition. The series premiered on the Sci Fi Channel in 2005 but ran only four episodes of Master Blasters in 2005, then dropped the series. The Discovery Channel has picked it up and is currently being shown on the Science Channel. The show was filmed primarily at Northwest Regional Airport in Roanoke, Texas.

== Cast ==
- Dan Stroud as "Mad Scientist", Team Leader, Master Blasters Team
- Terry Stroud as "The Brain", Engineering and Design, Master Blasters Team

The remaining members of the Master Blasters Team are rotated each week.

== Episode list ==
No.	Title	Original release date
1	"The Blasters of Oz"	July 27, 2005
The teams must launch a small farm house and safely return it to the ground in this Wizard of Oz inspired challenge.
2	"Car Field Goal"	August 3, 2005
The teams attempt to turn sports cars into rocket-powered footballs.
3	"Killer Lawn Darts"	August 10, 2005
The teams battle each other in the world’s largest game of lawn darts.
4	"Missile-Launching Spy Cars"	August 17, 2005
The teams craft deadly missile-launching go-carts in a spy-style challenge.
5	"Fans of Fury"	March 13, 2008
The teams compete to build giant, rocket-powered whirlybird helicopters.
6	"Alien Recon"	March 19, 2008
The teams must build a spacecraft with the capability of reaching an altitude of 2000 feet.
7	"A Very Master Blasters Christmas"	March 26, 2008
The teams are challenged to fly Santa's sleigh and drop presents as close to a target as possible.
8	"Ballistic Couch Potatoes"	April 2, 2008
The teams launch a sofa.
9	"Best of Master Blasters"	April 9, 2008
