= Blaster Master: Overdrive =

2010 video game

- Developer: Sunsoft
- Publisher: Gaijinworks
- Series: Blaster Master
- Platform: Wii
- Release: NA: February 8, 2010; EU: June 18, 2010
- Genres: Run and gun, platform, Metroidvania
- Mode: Single player

Blaster Master: Overdrive is a 2010 platform and run and gun video game released by Sunsoft and Gaijinworks as a WiiWare title for the Wii. It is the first reboot of the formula and soundtrack of the original Blaster Master game, also produced by Sunsoft, in 1988.

== Plot ==
The game's plot is based on an Earth that has become infected with a virus that has caused animals to be transformed into monsters that threaten humanity. Alex, a world-leading biologist, takes the fight to the mutations to find the source of the virus, using an armored vehicle called S.O.P.H.I.A. to battle against the creatures.

== Gameplay ==
Blaster Master: Overdrive is a re-imagining of the original game's formula, featuring updated graphics and a combination of new and old gameplay elements.

The gameplay reuses much of the same concepts of the original Blaster Master title. In side-scrolling sections, the players controls S.O.P.H.I.A. to progress through terrain spaces, gaining power-ups needed to face tougher monsters and progress to new areas. At times, the player can have Alex leave S.O.P.H.I.A. and enter smaller caves, at which point the perspective is turned to a top-down run-and-gun game, where the player controls Alex directly, using weapons and gaining upgrades to explore the caves and defeat boss characters.

== Development ==
In December 2009, Sunsoft revealed that they wanted to rebuild the Sunsoft brand in North America, and teamed with United States publisher Gaijinworks to bring the original Blaster Master as a Virtual Console title for the Wii. At the time, Vic Ireland, owner of Gaijinworks, stated that:

This first Wii release is a great start, but there is one upcoming announcement in particular that will demonstrate just how serious Yoshida-san is about rebuilding the Sunsoft console gaming brand here. Game fans are going to be pretty happy when they hear about it -– I know I was.

— Vic Ireland, Gamasutra, December 2009.

Blaster Master: Overdrive was announced on February 6, 2010, only 2 days before its North America release on WiiWare. On release, the game was criticized only to support one controller configuration (using the Wii Remote in a horizontal alignment in the same manner as the original Nintendo Entertainment System controllers; Ireland stated that he was working with Sunsoft to help implement a patch to include alternative control schemes, including through use of the Classic Controller.

== Reception ==
Reception

Aggregate score
Aggregator	Score
Metacritic	58/100

Review scores
Publication	Score
1Up.com	B
GamesMaster	80%
GameTrailers	4.8/10
IGN	6.5/10
NGamer	40%
Nintendo Life	9/10
Official Nintendo Magazine	76%
The A.V. Club	C
Wired	7/10

Blaster Master: Overdrive received "mixed" reviews according to the review aggregation website Metacritic.

Critics praised the title as a modern upgrade to a classic Nintendo Entertainment System game, but identified faults with its controls and lack of progressive scan support that limited the graphics quality. John Meyer of Wired identified the game as the "most faithful to the original" of the other attempts to recapture the Blaster Master gameplay, improving on the original game by adding a map screen and tweaking the gameplay in the top-down sections, but noted the default, uncustomized controls, placing the strafing action button on the backside of the remote would lead to hand cramping. Bob Mackey of 1UP.com noted the game, while still remaining challenging, "manages to iron out a few unforgivable aspects" of the original Blaster Master, but also lamented that the improved gameplay in the top-down sections suffered from the choice of controls.
