= Blaster Master: Enemy Below =

2000 video game

- European box art
- Developers: JP: Outback Pty. Co.; NA: Sunsoft Games
- Publisher: Sunsoft
- Director: Hiroaki Higashiya
- Series: Blaster Master
- Platform: Game Boy Color
- Release: JP: February 24, 2000; NA: September 20, 2000; EU: October 27, 2000
- Genres: Run and gun, Metroidvania
- Mode: Single player

Blaster Master: Enemy Below, known in Japan as Metafight EX (メタファイトEX), is a 2000 run and gun video game released by Sunsoft for the Game Boy Color. It was also re-released for the Virtual Console on the Nintendo 3DS system in 2011, and on the Nintendo Classics service in 2023.

== Gameplay and premise ==
Blaster Master: Enemy Below is a run and gun game in which players control Jason and Sophia, a human and a vehicle respectively. It is set after the events of preceding titles in the series' timeline. It features areas with the same visual scheme as areas in the first Blaster Master game and also reuses sprites from it. The layouts of each area are different from the original. Enemy Below features both sidescrolling and overhead gameplay, the latter taking place in dungeons that players find while exploring the sidescrolling portion. These portions are typically put players in control of Sophia or Jason, though Jason can exit Sophia during the sidescrolling portion. In the overhead portions, players can only control Jason in four directions. Unlike Blaster Master where players could skip most dungeons, Enemy Below adds a key that is hidden in one of these dungeons that is required to fight the boss of the area. Players collect upgrades for both Jason and Sophia.

The premise of the Japanese version is entirely different than that of the English version. Players instead control Leonardo Gardner, who is tasked with eliminating invading monsters.

== Development ==
Blaster Master: Enemy Below was developed by Sunsoft's British development studio. It was released on February 24, 2000 in Japan, September 24, 2000 in North America and October 27, 2000 in Europe. It was re-released for the Nintendo 3DS' Virtual Console service in 2011, and for the Nintendo Classics service in 2023. In 2024, Blaster Master: Enemy Below was eventually re-released on the Sunsoft Collection 2 cartridge for the Evercade.

== Reception ==
Reception

Aggregate score
Aggregator	Score	
Aggregator	3DS	GBC
GameRankings	N/A	76%

Review scores
Publication	Score	
Publication	3DS	GBC
AllGame	N/A	4/5
Game Informer	N/A	8.25/10
GameSpot	N/A	8.6/10
IGN	8/10	8/10
Nintendo Power	N/A	7.6/10
Official Nintendo Magazine	70%	N/A

The game received favorable reviews according to the review aggregation website GameRankings. Game Informer praised it for how it brought the series back, noting its length and difficulty as positives. Both Hardcore Gaming 101 and IGN felt it was a solid entry in the series, but lamented that it did not offer much new for it. IGN also felt that fans of the series would enjoy it, though noted that it was difficult to the point of frustration. They added that it was "probably the game [they] were asked most about" after opening IGN Pocket. The 3DS release in particular was noted by IGN as the definitive version due to the presence of save states. Despite criticism for feeling too similar to the original game, Allgame felt that the additions were adequate to set it apart. However, they felt that the overhead portions were a downside of the game due to its controls. GameSpot praised the addition of a password save function and added weaponry. They also found the visuals to be of high quality, noting that it was "hard to believe" that these are Game Boy Color graphics. Official Nintendo Magazine felt that it would appeal to people who enjoy difficult games, but that many will be turned off by it. They also criticized the game for its overhead controls, finding them difficult and frustrating. Digitally Downloaded felt it was dull, stating that it copies Metroid without copying its charm. They also criticized it for a lacking story and soundtrack.
