= Racing Hero =

1989 video game

- Japanese flyer
- Developer: Sega
- Publisher: Sega
- Composer: Hikoshi Hashimoto
- Platform: Arcade
- Release: Arcade: WW: 1989
- Genre: Arcade-style racing
- Mode: Single-player
- Arcade system: Sega X Board

Racing Hero is a 1989 arcade racing game from Sega that runs on the Sega X Board hardware (the same hardware used for games such as After Burner and Power Drift). In Racing Hero, the player takes part in an international race aboard a motorcycle and races against time and other vehicles. It draws much inspiration from Sega's successful Hang-On and Out Run series.

== Gameplay ==
The player controls a motorcycle from behind the rider's own perspective, and must reach the checkpoints in each stage before time runs out. The player must also deal with other vehicles and obstacles, where collisions will result in an explosion and loss of time. The race starts in Australia and once the player reaches the end of each stage, they are taken to a fork in the road screen where they can choose the next country they wish to race in.

== Release ==
The game was exhibited at Japan's AOU show in February 1990.

== Reception ==
In Japan, Game Machine listed Racing Hero on their May 1, 1990 issue as being the second most-successful upright/cockpit arcade cabinet of the month.

Julian Rignall of Computer and Video Games reviewed the arcade game in 1990, giving it a 92% score.
