= Blaster Master: Blasting Again =

2000 video game

- North American box art
- Developer: Art System
- Publishers: JP/EU: Sunsoft; NA: Crave Entertainment
- Director: Kiyoshi Kitabayashi
- Producer: Naoki Matsunaga
- Programmer: Kiyoshi Kitabayashi
- Writers: Junji Miyoshi; Naoki Matsunaga
- Composer: Satoshi Asano
- Series: Blaster Master
- Platform: PlayStation
- Release: JP: July 13, 2000; EU: September 8, 2000; NA: November 21, 2001
- Genre: Action-adventure
- Mode: Single-player

Blaster Master: Blasting Again (known as Blaster Master in Japan) is a 2000 action-adventure video game developed by Art System and published by Sunsoft in Japan and Europe and Crave Entertainment in North America for the PlayStation. The fifth title in the Blaster Master series, it was released in Japan in July 2000, Europe in September 2000, and North America in November 2001.

== Gameplay ==
Blaster Master: Blasting Again is a third-person 3D platformer in which the player takes control of the high-tech, all-terrain combat vehicle SOPHIA J-7. The player navigates through several areas of caverns to uncover and ultimately stop the treacherous plans of a mysterious alien race of Lightning Beings. On some occasions the player's character must exit SOPHIA and go solo through alien complexes. As the game progresses, the player will earn upgrades for SOPHIA, and be able to salvage weapon upgrades for the pilot. The player views cut-scenes that convey the key elements in the story. The character will fight a boss at the end of each stage.

The player's character is Roddy, a sixteen-year-old boy at the helm of an all-terrain combat vehicle, SOPHIA. The player pilots SOPHIA through a labyrinth of 3D rooms in search of clues to the enemy's movements. Occasionally the player will encounter enemy installations or limiting topography that will force Roddy to leave Sophia, and advance on foot. As the game progresses, new equipment will be made available for SOPHIA, allowing access to new areas.

== Plot ==
In Blaster Master, Jason first encountered the Lightning Beings and their leader at the time, the Plutonium Boss. With the help of Eve and Sophia 3rd, the Plutonium Boss' plans were eliminated. However, the threat of the Lightning Beings persisted and Jason spent the next many years defeating them time and time again. Eventually, in between missions and prowling the underground keeping monsters at bay, Jason and Eve bore two children, Roddy and Elfie.

Several years after Eve's subsequent death, Jason met an untimely death at the hands of Lightning Beings. Five years after the death of Eve, the Earth is plagued by a mysterious geological phenomenon and natural disasters. Having rebuilt Sophia 4th into Sophia J-7 (to honor the name of their father, Jason), Roddy and Elfie take up the mantle of Earth's protectors at a very young age.

A suspicious bout of activity from the Lightning Beings prompts Roddy and Elfie to investigate. As Roddy takes Sophia underground to battle his foes, he learns that someone has resurrected the power of the Plutonium Boss and that the sequences of events are connected to the alien heritage of the siblings' mother.

== Development ==
Although the game is a sequel to the original Blaster Master for the NES, the writers of Blasting Again used elements from the Worlds of Power novelization of Blaster Master in the game's storyline. Particularly, the character of Eve, an original character from the novel who was not in the NES game, was introduced in Blasting Again as the wife of Jason and the mother of Roddy and Elfie. The game was initially meant to be published in North America by Sunsoft on November 7, 2000, before Crave Entertainment eventually released the game the following year on November 21, 2001.

== Reception ==
Reception

Aggregate score
Aggregator	Score
GameRankings	74%

Review scores
Publication	Score
Electronic Gaming Monthly	6.5/10
Game Informer	5/10
GameSpot	7.7/10
PlayStation Official Magazine – UK	3/10
Official U.S. PlayStation Magazine	3/5

The game received "average" reviews according to the review aggregation website GameRankings.
