= Sammy Corporation =

Developer and retailer of pachinko machines

- Logo used since 1997

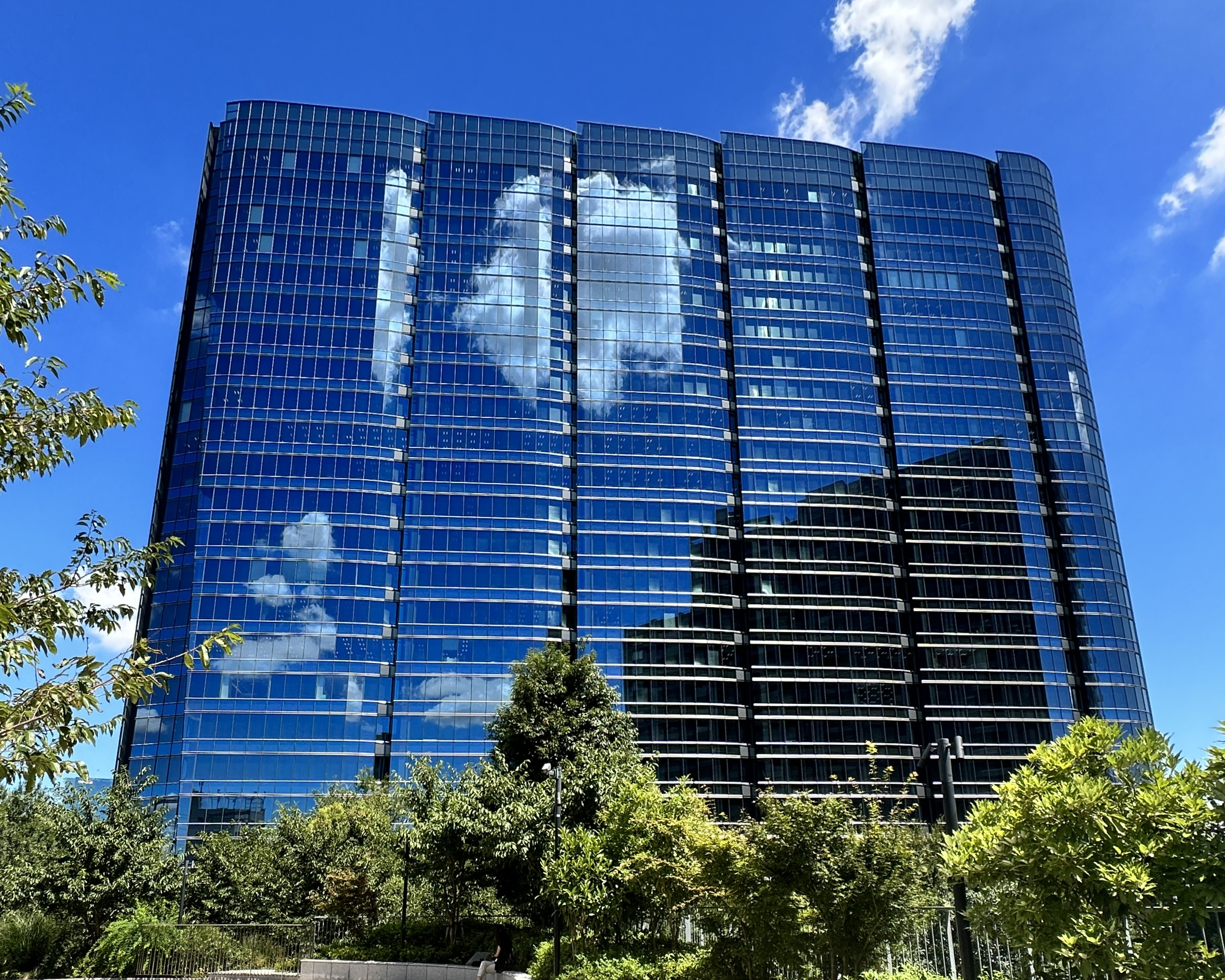
- Headquarters in Shinagawa, Tokyo
- Trade name: Sammy
- Native name: 株式会社サミー
- Romanized name: Kabushiki-gaisha Samī
- Formerly: Sammy Industry Co., Ltd (1975–1997)
- Type: Subsidiary
- Industry: Video games Gambling
- Founded: November 1, 1975; 50 years ago
- Founders: Hajime Satomi
- Headquarters: Nishi-Shinagawa, Shinagawa, Tokyo, Japan
- Key people: Haruki Satomi (Chairman and CEO); Ayumu Hoshino (president and COO)
- Products: Arcade games; Mobile games; Pachinko machines; Pachislot machines
- Number of employees: 832 (2023)
- Parent: Sega Sammy Holdings (2004–present)
- Divisions: Sammy Digital Security; Sammy Facility Service; Sammy Networks; Taiyo Elec; Rodeo; m2r; Galaxy Graphics
- Website: www.sammy.co.jp
- Footnotes "Sega Sammy Holdings Fiscal Year 2020 Full Results Appendix" (PDF). Sega Sammy Holdings. May 13, 2020. Archived from the original (PDF) on May 15, 2020. "Notice of Changes of Directors and Executive Officers at SEGA SAMMY HOLDINGS INC. and its Major Subsidiaries" (PDF). Sega Sammy Holdings. February 28, 2020. Archived from the original (PDF) on June 3, 2020.

Sammy Corporation (Note: Japanese: 株式会社サミー, Hepburn: Kabushiki-gaisha Samī) is a Japanese developer and retailer of video game and gambling products and subsidiary of Sega Sammy Holdings, headquartered in Shinagawa, Tokyo. Sammy manufactures pachinko and pachislot machines, and it expanded into video game development in the 1990s with games such as Viewpoint, Survival Arts, and The Rumble Fish.

Sammy was founded as Sammy Industry (Note: Japanese: 株式会社サミー産業, Hepburn: Kabushiki-gaisha Samī Sangyō) on November 1, 1975 as a spin-off of the arcade division of Satomi Corporation. The company primarily dealt with slot machines and arcade cabinets in Japan. Sammy largely left the video game industry by the late 1990s to focus on its pachinko and arcade management operations. In 2004, the company merged with video game developer and publisher Sega to form Sega Sammy Holdings.

== History ==
=== Company origins as Sammy Industry ===
Sammy Corporation started in 1975 as Sammy Industry Co., Ltd. from the split of Satomi Corporation's manufacturing and marketing divisions for amusement arcade machines. In 1978, Sammy Industry built a factory in Itabashi-ku, Tokyo in order to take advantage of the growing popularity of video games, specifically invader games. During this year, it began game machine development.

In 1981, Sammy joined a subsidiary called "Nippon Dendousiki Yuugiki Kougyou Kyoudou Kumiai" and established a subsidiary called Sammy Sales and Marketing Co., Ltd. located in Osaka City.

In 1982, Sammy Industry started to market and sell pachislot machines. During this time, it launched the Empire pachislot machine. In 1988, an American subsidiary of Sammy Industry was established in California, US. They would sell video games from other companies in the US, and eventually, release redemption games (some of which were originally released by Banpresto in Japan). In this year, Sammy Industry expanded its market by venturing into sales and marketing of video game software.

Former logo

In 1989, Sammy Industry relocated to Sayama City, Saitama Prefecture. At this time, it began selling its Aladdin single-bonus pachislot machine.

In 1990, Sammy Industry created a video game software and marketing division called Japan Soft Technology Co., Ltd. located in Nagoya City. Within this year, Sammy Industry created another gaming subsidiary called Nippon eicom Co., Ltd., established in Itabashi-ku, Tokyo. In 1991, Sammy absorbed its Sammy Marketing Co., Ltd. subsidiary and moved head office to Toshima-ku, Tokyo. In 1992, Sammy absorbed its Japan Soft Technology Co., Ltd. subsidiary. During this year, the American subsidiary was relocated to Illinois, US. In 1995, Sammy created a subsidiary called Techno Sammy Co., Ltd. for rationalization through expansion. This subsidiary was designed for sales and marketing for Pachinko machines. In this year, it launched the CR Gold pachinko machine. In 1996, Sammy created an American subsidiary called Sammy USA Corporation. It was established in Illinois, US. In 1997, Techno Sammy Co., Ltd. was absorbed into Sammy Industry. Sammy Industry formed a subsidiary called MAXBET Co., Ltd., established in Meguro-ku, Tokyo. Sammy opens an amusement arcade in Sagamihara city, Kanagawa.

=== Corporal changes as Sammy Corporation ===
During 1997, the corporate name of the company changed from Sammy Industry Co., Ltd. to Sammy Corporation. Within this year, Sammy Corporation launched Ultra Seven, the first pachinko machine to utilize characters. In 1998, Sammy Corporation created a Corporate-owned building which was used as a logistics centre in Sapporo city, Hokkaido in order to increase their market and distribution share. Sammy Corporation created a subsidiary called Sammy Amusement Service Co., Ltd., which was established in Toshima-ku, Tokyo, Japan & Hanwha Dongil Building, Myeongdong, Seoul, South Korea to increase sales for arcade game machines. Sammy Corporation also opened another amusement arcade called "Sammy's Street 118," in Oji Kita-ku, Tokyo. During this time, it also launched the Ultra Man Club 3, a pachislot machine with CT functions.

In 1999, Sammy Corporation went into a capital participation with Spike Co., Ltd. Vaill Co., Ltd. was created as a joint venture subsidiary with Spike Co., Ltd. Within this year, a subsidiary called Underground Liberation Force Inc., was established in Shibuya-ku, Tokyo as a means for Sammy Corporation to enter into the music industry. During this time, Sammy Corporation registered stock on the OTC market. Within this year, it also launched GeGeGe No Kitaro, the first pachislot machine that used an LCD screen.

In 2000, Sammy Corporation opened nine sales offices around Japan in order to increase the market share of pachinko and pachislot machines. In order to increase pachislot machine distribution, Sammy Corporation made a business alliance with K. K. Aristocrat Technologies for pachislot manufacturing distribution. Within this year, Sammy Corporation invested in further subsidiaries by making RODEO Co., Ltd. (formerly Barcrest Co., Ltd.), a subsidiary and placed a stake in video game developer Dimps Corp. In 2001, Sammy began OEM supply to K. K. Aristocrat Technologies. In this year, it was listed in the first section of the Tokyo Stock Exchange. Later that year, Sammy hired former Tradewest executive John Rowe to start out Sammy Entertainment to publish games for the niche American market, which later became Sammy Studios and now High Moon Studios.

Sammy Corporation aided in the establishment of Joyco Systems Corporation, a company dedicated in the development of equipment for pachinko and pachislot machines. During this time, Sammy Corporation also established subsidiaries outside Japan, Sammy Europe Limited was established in London, UK and Sammy Entertainment Inc., was established in Los Angeles, US. Within this year, Sammy Design Co., Ltd., was established as a subsidiary for Shuko Electronics Co., Ltd. During this time, it also began their operations in the official i-mode site, "Sammy 777 Town,". In this year, Sammy launched a pachislot machine called Juoh: the first with AT functions.

In 2002, Sammy developed 3D graphics display system for their pachinko and pachislot machines. Sammy's American subsidiary changed its name from Sammy Holding Co., Inc., to Sammy Studio, Inc., and relocated to San Diego, California, US.

During 2003, Sammy was in talks with gaming conglomerate Sega to be part of the Sammy company. Despite Sega publicly declining the offer because the two companies lacked synergies, a takeover occurred in which Sammy purchased a 22.4 per cent stake in Sega from the company's one-time parent company, CSK. Sammy CEO, Hajime Satomi stated in a public statement that "In the future, we may take an additional stake in Sega," and that Sammy would not "Rule out the possibility of making Sega a subsidiary".

During mid-2004, Sammy bought a controlling share in Sega Corporation at a cost of $1.1 billion, creating the new company Sega Sammy Holdings, an entertainment conglomerate. Since then, Sega and Sammy became subsidiaries of the aforementioned holding company, with both operating independently, while the executive departments merged. Sammy handed its video game and arcade business to Sega to focus on pachinkos and pachislots only. The copyright to the back catalogue of Sammy's video games is owned by Sega.

In 2018, Sammy's offices were relocated to Shinagawa, Tokyo.
