= ESPN NBA Hangtime '95 =

1995 video game

- Developer: Sony Imagesoft
- Publisher: Sony Imagesoft
- Platform: Sega CD
- Release: NA: March 1995
- Genres: Sports (Basketball)
- Modes: Single-player, multiplayer

ESPN NBA Hangtime '95 is a basketball video game developed and published by Sony Imagesoft for the Sega CD.

== Gameplay ==
ESPN NBA Hangtime '95 includes all 27 NBA teams which are represented by their top three players at the time as well as 12 International country teams represented by fictional athletes. Players choose a team and play two-on-two basketball matches in exhibition or season modes. Hangtime's gameplay has been compared to NBA Jam's, and features arcade-style moves like super spins and dunks. Hangtime also features full-motion video segments of ESPN's Dan Patrick and Stuart Scott covering the matches in its national and international modes respectively.

== Development and release ==
ESPN NBA Hangtime '95 was developed and published by Sony Imagesoft. It was announced alongside other Sony sports titles using the ESPN license slated for fall 1994 releases for Sega consoles including ESPN Baseball Tonight, ESPN National Hockey Night, ESPN SpeedWorld, and ESPN Sunday Night NFL. ESPN NBA Hangtime '95 was part of a buy-two-get-one-free promotion for Sega CD games from Sony that lasted from December 1994 to February 1995. The game was released exclusively for Sega CD in March 1995.

== Reception ==
Reception

Review scores
Publication	Score
Game Informer	4.75/10
GameFan	40/100
GamePro	3.75/5
Next Generation	1/5
Ação Games	4/5
Super GamePower	3.2/5
VideoGames	7/10

ESPN NBA Hangtime '95 drew a mixed response from critics with most publications comparing and contrasting the game with Midway's hugely popular NBA Jam. GameFan contributor Cal Cavalier largely discounted its graphics as "choppy and jerky" and felt it had even less gameplay depth than 1988's Jordan vs. Bird: One on One. Next Generation was very critical of the game, labeling it "possibly the worst basketball game of the year" due to tedious gameplay, poor control, and long load times. The review concluded by advising potential players not to "put other games near this one, it could be contagious." Game Informer vaguely described the game as "wretched" and "horrible", favoring Midway's similarly titled 1996 arcade release NBA Hangtime which the magazine conversely considered to be "quite good".

Both Geoff Higgins of VideoGames and Paul Curthoys of GamePro offered mostly positive assessments, complimenting its variety of dunks and combos and its ESPN2 World Tour mode. While Curthoys proclaimed it "couldn't have a prettier wrapping" with its inclusion of full-motion video commentary, he found the graphics during gameplay were hurt by small, sluggish sprites and lack of animation. Likewise, Higgins admitted that the "graphics aren't the best" and opined that some of the exaggerated moves could repel players looking for a more realistic experience. The Brazilian magazine Ação Games stated that the game stood out for having "cool" music during matches and for "mixing a bit of NBA realism with craziness".

== See also ==
- NBA ShootOut, Sony's successor for the PlayStation
