= Warlocked =

2000 real-time strategy video game

- Developer: Bits Studios
- Publisher: Nintendo of America
- Designer: Martin Wheeler
- Programmer: Steven Clark
- Artist: Martin Wheeler
- Composer: Jeroen Tel
- Platform: Game Boy Color
- Release: NA: July 24, 2000
- Genre: Real-time strategy
- Modes: Single-player, multiplayer

Warlocked is a real-time strategy video game developed by Bits Studios and published by Nintendo for the Game Boy Color. It was solely released in North America on July 24, 2000. Choosing between human and beast factions, the player plays through twelve scenarios from each faction, gathering resources, building fortresses, and managing troops to defeat the opposing force.

The music for Warlocked was composed by Jeroen Tel. Critical reception towards the game was positive, with some critics noting its status as the only real-time strategy game for the handheld. It received IGN's "Best Game Boy Strategy" award in 2000. Despite the accolades, sales were low. A sequel was planned for the Game Boy Advance titled Wizards but it was cancelled.

== Gameplay ==
Gameplay screenshot

Warlocked is a real-time strategy game. Split between two campaigns based on the human and beast factions, the player goes through their campaign to defeat the enemy. There are 24 missions, 12 for both campaigns. Played in an overhead perspective, locations range from forests to tundras. A fog of war covers the field, which can be revealed after sending out soldiers to their positions. Different soldiers such as archers and wizards can be used for both factions. Wizards unique for each side range from giving opposing soldiers the plague or turning them to chickens. Multiplayer can be played between two people with Game Boy Colors and the Game Link Cable. The Link Cable can also be used to trade wizards between players to collect them all.

== Development and release ==
Warlocked was developed by British company Bits Studios and published by Nintendo. Beginning development in early 1999, the game was programmed by Steven Clark, with Martin Wheeler being the graphics artist and game designer. The music was composed by Jeroen Tel. The game was showcased by Nintendo at the Kimpton Sir Francis Drake Hotel for games journalists to play. It was released on the Game Boy Color exclusively in the United States on July 24, 2000.

== Reception ==
Reception

Aggregate score
Aggregator	Score
GameRankings	85.62%

Review scores
Publication	Score
Electronic Gaming Monthly	9/8.5/8.5
Game Informer	8/10
GameSpot	6.6/10
IGN	9/10
Nintendo Power	8.2/10
Nintendojo	10/10

Warlocked received an aggregate score of 86% on GameRankings. Critics compared the game to the Warcraft and Command & Conquer franchises. Justin Whirledge of the Daily Radar noted that it was the only real-time strategy game for the Game Boy Color, calling it a "treat" and praising the game's depth and multiplayer options. He also called it so simple to pick up that it would even appeal to casual gamers. Nintendojo's Schuyler Lystad considered it the best game he ever played on the system, giving the game a perfect score. A reviewer for Nintendo Power thought it was a great introduction for people to the real-time strategy genre.

Andy McNamara for Game Informer, while criticizing the game for its slow movement, gave praise to its gameplay. Jeff Gerstmann for GameSpot was less positive, criticizing its control scheme and the difficulty of selecting and deselecting units. Gerstmann also believed that the game would be too simple and too much like Warcraft for RTS fans to play for long. Despite this, he called the game pretty good and commended it for overcoming the limitations of being on the Game Boy Color. IGN named the game as the "Best Game Boy Strategy" game of 2000.

Retrospective reviews were also positive. Digitally Downloaded's Matt Sainsbury gave praise towards its multiplayer. Joshua Jankiewicz at Hardcore Gaming 101 considered it a feat from Bits Studios making a great Game Boy Color title. In 2009, IGN listed the game as one they would like to see on a hypothetical Virtual Console platform for the Nintendo DSi, owing partially due to its real-time strategy interface. While receiving positive reception, sales for the game were low.

== Legacy ==
In spite of the game's low sales, Bits Studios attempted to make a sequel to the game, titled Wizards. It was in development for the Game Boy Advance and was to feature four-player multiplayer and gaming modes such as capture the flag. Originally slated for release in 2003, it was cancelled due to the lack of a publisher, despite screenshots of the sequel being shown. The studio continued to make unrelated games for other consoles, such as Die Hard: Vendetta and Constantine for the PS2 and Xbox, respectively, as well as Rogue Ops. Nevertheless, the lukewarm reception of these games caused the studio's parent company to sell them off in 2008.
