= No Escape (video game) =

1994 video game

- SNES box art
- Developer: Bits Studios
- Publishers: Psygnosis (Genesis); Sony Imagesoft (SNES)
- Platforms: Genesis, Super NES
- Release: Genesis: NA: 1994; SNES: NA: November 1994
- Genres: Action, platform
- Mode: Single-player

No Escape is a video game developed by Bits Studios and published by Psygnosis for the Sega Genesis and by Sony Imagesoft for the Super Nintendo Entertainment System, based on the 1994 film of the same name.

== Gameplay ==
No Escape is a game in which the player is the inmate Robbins trying to escape the Absolom penal colony island.

== Development and release ==
No Escape was developed by the British Bits Studios. Versions were made for the SNES and Sega Genesis. The game was programmed by Steve Howard, who also worked for the company on its SNES film tie-in games Terminator 2 and Mary Shelley's Frankenstein. The three games share Howard's source code. Frankenstein and the SNES edition of No Escape, which were produced simultaneously, were released by Sony Imagesoft. No Escape for the Genesis was published by Psygnosis.

A Sega CD port was announced and advertised for release by Sony Imagesoft but was cancelled. Former producer Mike Arkin stated that it did not ship due to Sony's realization that the console was a failure. He claimed to have been gifted quite possibly the only physical copy of the Sega CD version of the game, but that he had misplaced it.

== Reception ==
Reception

Review scores
Publication	Score
AllGame	2.5/5 (SNES/GEN)
GamePro	3.125/5 (GEN)
Next Generation	1/5 (GEN)
Electronic Games	C (GEN)
VideoGames	5/10 (GEN)

Next Generation reviewed the Genesis version of the game, rating it one star out of five, and stated that "the only way to escape the annoying gameplay, repetitive soundtrack, and frustrating control is to not get caught buying this game!"
