= Dream TV =

Dream TV may refer to:

- Dream TV (video game), a side-scrolling action video game for the Super NES
- Dream TV (Egypt), Arabic satellite television channel headquartered in Egypt
- Dream TV (Turkey), Turkish music channel
- Dream Satellite TV, television broadcasting service via satellite in the Philippines
