= Sony Imagesoft =

Former American video game publisher

Sony Imagesoft Inc.
- Formerly: CSG Imagesoft (1988–1991)
- Type: Subsidiary
- Industry: Video games
- Founded: December 15, 1988; 37 years ago
- Defunct: August 17, 1995; 31 years ago
- Fate: Divided into Sony Interactive Studios America and Sony Interactive PC Software America; Marketing folded into Sony Computer Entertainment
- Successors: Sony Computer Entertainment; 989 Studios
- Headquarters: Los Angeles, California
- Parent: CBS/Sony Group (1989–1991); Sony Electronic Publishing (1991–1995)

Sony Imagesoft Inc. was an American video game publisher that operated from 1988 to 1995 and was located in California. It was established and incorporated in December 1988 in Los Angeles, California, as a subsidiary of the Japan-based CBS/Sony Group (CSG) and initially named CSG Imagesoft Inc. Their focus at the beginning was on marketing games exclusively for Nintendo consoles, and the company's initial of slate was derived from Japanese-originated titles, mostly titles from Epic/Sony Records.

Its involvement in producing most video game adaptions of various movies at the time led to the company's poor reputation. According to then Sony Imagesoft President Kelly Flock, he noted the involvement of nongaming executives in the decision making process.

== History ==
=== Beginnings and early years ===
The company started and incorporated on December 15, 1988 in Los Angeles, California, as CSG Imagesoft Inc. as a unit of CBS/Sony Group to market games exclusively for Nintendo consoles. The company's trademark was first registered on October 17, 1989.

The first release was Super Dodge Ball in summer 1989. UK-developed games such as Solstice and Dragon's Lair followed in 1990. Both were also published in Japan through Epic/Sony Records. Both titles were massive critical and commercial successes, with Solstice being the most expensive NES game in the Western market ever produced and became the company's first big break and major hit.

In 1991, the company was reorganized, so Sony launched Sony Electronic Publishing, to capitalize on the acquisition of Columbia Pictures two years prior in an effort for new multimedia, and CSG Imagesoft itself was renamed to Sony Imagesoft to reflect the change, under the leadership of Olaf Olafsson.

=== Sega partnership ===
On May 20, 1992, Sega of America and Sony Electronic Publishing announced a partnership to create content for Sega's consoles under the direction of Imagesoft. Besides Sega's cartridge-based Genesis and Game Gear consoles the partnership targeted the upcoming Sega CD peripheral.

Among the first titles released for Sega's consoles after the announcement are Sewer Shark and Hook. Sewer Shark, initially released exclusively to Sega CD, is a rail-shooter that years earlier had been shelved as part of the ill-fated Control-Vision platform. The Hook video games are tie-ins to the Spielberg feature film Hook that premiered in December 1991 and was produced by Sony-owned TriStar Pictures. Ports of the video game for Sega platforms are based on the Super NES game published earlier by Imagesoft. The Sega CD version was enhanced with better cut scenes with voice actors and digital stills and featured music from the film soundtrack.

=== 1992–1993 expansions and development division ===
In 1992, the company launched a European business publishing subsidiary Sony Electronic Publishing, Ltd. and appointed Phil Harrison of Mindscape as director of product development, and later started publishing video games under the Sony Imagesoft label.

In early 1993, the company expanded by signing a deal with ESPN, to market a series of sports video games for home consoles. The company then signed a deal with TecMagik Entertainment Ltd. for distribution of titles for the European market.

Also that year, the company acquired successful British game publisher/developer Psygnosis, and ran as an autonomous video game publishing label, with Sony handling distribution of its titles. The acquisition cost Sony £20 million. The company later signed a deal with Media Design Interactive to market its titles for the American market.

In late 1993, the company entered into its own in-house development division in the San Diego area, hiring away staff members from Park Place Productions. The company begin developing games internally, such as the ESPN game series. In the summer of 1994, the company invested in a new startup company SingleTrac Entertainment Technologies, to produce 3D games, in a development deal, that eventually came out for development of its PlayStation games, like Twisted Metal and Warhawk.

In May 1994, the division of Sony Electronic Publishing, Sony Imagesoft, became one of the earliest licenses of the PlayStation in the North American market after Sony Computer Entertainment of America was established as a division of SEP, initially Sony Imagesoft would have ran autonomously from SCEA.

The following month, Sony Imagesoft and Walt Disney Computer Software teamed up for a video game project, Mickey Mania, on platforms, that became a bestseller for the company since Solstice and Equinox. In August 1994, the parent company consolidated all PC software publishing divisions under the Sony Imagesoft name.

In early 1995, the company bought out the video game rights to the character Spawn from Todd McFarlane Productions.

=== 1995 changes ===
In March 1995, Sony Imagesoft announced that it had appointed Kelly Flock as president. Flock came from Trimark Interactive where he was executive vice president since March 1993. He intended to turn them around at Imagesoft as he abruptly stopped production of its competitior's products in favor of just the about-to-debut PlayStation. The company then let its ESPN game license expire, and brought sports games under normal contracts. The company then subsequently sold the publishing rights of Todd McFarlane's Spawn: The Video Game to Acclaim Entertainment before it was released.

Starting in July 1995, just two months prior to the release of the PlayStation console in Western markets, Sony Electronic Publishing restructured. The main Sony Electronic Publishing company was renamed to Sony Interactive Entertainment on August 17, 1995. All video game marketing from Sony Imagesoft was folded into Sony Computer Entertainment of America (SCEA), with about 100 employees transferred from Santa Monica to Foster City. The video game business of Sony Imagesoft was merged with the product development branch of SCEA to form Sony Interactive Studios America also on August 17, 1995, and also inherited the San Diego development team, which would later be renamed to 989 Studios in 1998.

The computer software business of Imagesoft became Sony Interactive PC Software America and was headed by general manager Ray Sangster, who was of Sony Computer Entertainment Europe. Titles released under Sony Interactive PC Software America ran under the labels of Sony Imagesoft and Psygnosis and used its own logos. In August, the Los Angeles Times said Sony had canceled prior projects on computer and video game platforms other than its own PlayStation. It also said Psygnosis became Sony Interactive Europe.

== Games published ==
Title	Platform	Genre	Release date	Developer	References
3 Ninjas Kick Back	Sega Genesis	Action	June 1, 1994	Malibu Interactive	
3 Ninjas Kick Back	Super NES	Action	November 19, 1994	Malibu Interactive	
3 Ninjas Kick Back	Sega CD	Action	November 1994	Malibu Interactive	
Altered Space	Game Boy	Puzzle adventure	September 1991	Software Creations	
Bram Stoker's Dracula	Game Boy	Action	September 1993	Psygnosis/Probe Software	
Bram Stoker's Dracula	NES	Action	September 1993	Psygnosis/Probe Software	
Bram Stoker's Dracula	Game Gear	Action	August 1993	Psygnosis/Probe Software	
Bram Stoker's Dracula	Master System	Action	November 19, 1993	Psygnosis/Probe Software	
Bram Stoker's Dracula	Super NES	Action	September 1993	Traveller's Tales/Psygnosis	
Bram Stoker's Dracula	Sega Genesis	Action	July 1993	Traveller's Tales/Psygnosis	
Championship Soccer '94	Sega CD	Sports	June 1994	Sensible Software	
Cliffhanger	Sega Genesis	Action	October 25, 1993	Malibu Interactive	
Cliffhanger	Sega CD	Action	November 1993	Malibu Interactive	
Cliffhanger	Super NES	Action	October 1993	Malibu Interactive	
Cliffhanger	Game Boy	Action	October 1993	Spidersoft	
Cliffhanger	Game Gear	Action	October 1993	Spidersoft	
Chuck Rock	Super NES	Side-scrolling platformer	November 1992	Core Design	
Chuck Rock	Sega CD	Side-scrolling platformer	December 1992	Core Design	
Dragon's Lair	NES	Action	December 29, 1990	Motivetime	
Dragon's Lair: The Legend	Game Boy	Action	January 1991	Motivetime	
Eastern Mind: The Lost Souls of Tong Nou	Microsoft Windows	Point-and-click adventure	Early August 1995	OutSide Directors Company	
Eastern Mind: The Lost Souls of Tong Nou	Macintosh	Point-and-click adventure	Early August 1995	OutSide Directors Company	
Equinox	Super NES	Action-adventure	March 1994	Software Creations	
ESPN Baseball Tonight	Super NES	Sports	May 1994	Park Place Productions	
ESPN Baseball Tonight	Sega Genesis	Sports	May 1994	Park Place Productions	
ESPN Baseball Tonight	Sega CD	Sports	October 1994	Sony Imagesoft	
ESPN National Hockey Night	Sega Genesis	Sports	August 1, 1994	Sony Imagesoft	
ESPN National Hockey Night	Sega CD	Sports	August 1, 1994	Sony Imagesoft	
ESPN National Hockey Night	Super NES	Sports	August 1, 1994	Sony Imagesoft	
ESPN NBA HangTime '95	Sega CD	Sports	1994	Sony Imagesoft	
ESPN SpeedWorld	Sega Genesis	Racing	1994	Sony Imagesoft	
ESPN SpeedWorld	Super NES	Racing	1994	Sony Imagesoft	
ESPN Sunday Night NFL	Sega CD	Sports	1993	Ringler Studios	
ESPN Sunday Night NFL	Sega Genesis	Sports	August 1, 1994	Ringler Studios	
ESPN Sunday Night NFL	Super NES	Sports	November 1994	Ringler Studios	
Extra Innings	Super NES	Sports	March 20, 1992	Sting Entertainment	
Flashback	Super NES	Action-Adventure	1993	Tiertex	
Gear Works	Game Gear	Puzzle	December 1993	Teque	
Gear Works	Game Boy	Puzzle	October 1993	Teque	
Ground Zero: Texas	Sega CD	Action	November 1993	Digital Pictures	
Hook	NES	Action	April 1992	Ocean Software	
Hook	Game Boy	Action	April 1992	Ocean Software	
Hook	Super NES	Action	October 1992	Ukiyotei	
Hook	Sega Genesis	Action	1992/March 1993 (European Mega CD version)	Core Design	
Hook	Sega CD	Action	1992/March 1993 (European Mega CD version)	Core Design	
Hook	Game Gear	Action	July 1993	Spidersoft	
Hudson Hawk	NES	Platform	1991	Ocean Software	
Hudson Hawk	Game Boy	Platform	1991	Ocean Software	
Jeopardy!	Sega CD	Game show	November 1994	Absolute Entertainment	
Jeopardy!	Microsoft Windows	Game show	1994	Sony Imagesoft	
Johnny Mnemonic	Microsoft Windows	Interactive movie	May 26, 1995	Propaganda Code, directed by Douglas Gayeton	
Johnny Mnemonic	Macintosh	Interactive movie	May 26, 1995	Propaganda Code, directed by Douglas Gayeton	
Johnny Mnemonic	Sega CD	Interactive movie	unreleased		
Last Action Hero	Sega Genesis	Action	November 1993	Bits Studios	
Last Action Hero	Game Gear	Action	November 1993	Bits Studios	
Last Action Hero	Super NES	Action	October 1993	Bits Studios	
Last Action Hero	Game Boy	Action	October 1993	Bits Studios	
Last Action Hero	NES	Action	October 1993	Teeny Weeny Games	
Last Action Hero	Sega CD	Beat 'em up	cancelled	Psygnosis	
Make My Video: Kris Kross	Sega CD	Music video	December 1992	Digital Pictures	
Make My Video: Power Factory Featuring C+C Music Factory	Sega CD	Music video	September 1993	Digital Pictures	
Mary Shelley's Frankenstein	Sega Genesis	Action	March 4, 1994	Bits Studios	
Mary Shelley's Frankenstein	Super NES	Action	November 1994	Bits Studios	
Mary Shelley's Frankenstein	Sega CD	Action	1994	Psygnosis	
Mega Turrican	Sega Mega Drive	Run and gun	November 1994	Factor 5	
Mickey Mania	Sega Genesis	Platform	October 1994	Traveller's Tales/Psygnosis	
Mickey Mania	Sega CD	Platform	October 1994	Traveller's Tales/Psygnosis	
Mickey Mania	Super NES	Platform	October 1994	Traveller's Tales/Psygnosis	
No Escape	Super NES	Action	November 1994	Bits Studios	
No Escape	Sega Genesis	Action	November 1994	Bits Studios	
Super Battletank 2 (European version)	Super NES	Action	1993	Absolute	
Super Bomberman (European version)	Super NES	Action	November 1993	Hudson Soft	
Skyblazer	Super NES	Action	March 16, 1994	Ukiyotei	
Sensible Soccer	Super NES	Sports	December 1993	Sensible Software	
Sensible Soccer	Sega Genesis	Sports	December 10, 1993	Sensible Software	
Sensible Soccer	Game Gear	Sports	February 11, 1994	Sensible Software	
Sensible Soccer	Game Boy	Sports	February 11, 1994	Sensible Software	
Sensible Soccer	Master System	Sports	February 11, 1994	Sensible Software	
Sewer Shark	Sega CD	Shooter	October 15, 1992	Digital Pictures	
Smart Ball	Super NES	Action-adventure	March 1992	Game Freak	
Soccer Mania	Game Boy	Sports	March 1992	Kitty Group Japan	
Solstice	NES	Puzzle	June 1990	Software Creations	
Super Dodge Ball	NES	Sports	June 1989	Technōs Japan	
Ultraverse Prime	Sega CD	Action	December 1994	Malibu Interactive	
Wheel of Fortune	Sega CD	Strategy	1994	Absolute Entertainment	
Wheel of Fortune	Microsoft Windows	Strategy	1994	Sony Imagesoft	

== Games developed ==
Title	Platform	Genre	Release date	Notes
ESPN Baseball Tonight	Sega CD	Sports	October 1994	
ESPN National Hockey Night	SNES, Sega Genesis, Sega CD	Sports	August 1, 1994	
ESPN NBA HangTime '95	Sega CD	Sports	1994	
ESPN SpeedWorld	SNES, Sega Genesis	Racing	1994	
Jeopardy! Classic	Sega CD, PC	Puzzle	May 22, 1994	Sega CD version co-developed by Absolute
Wheel of Fortune	Sega CD, PC	Strategy	1994	Sega CD version co-developed by Absolute

== Games unreleased ==
Title	Platform	Genre	Release date	Notes
Super Sushi Pinball	NES	Pinball	Unreleased	based on Super Pinball, cancelled in early 1990
Hook	Master System	Action	Unreleased	Ported by Spidersoft
Sensible Soccer	NES	Sports	Unreleased	Ported by Enigma Variations, source code leaked
Bug Blasters: The Exterminators	Sega CD	Action	Unreleased	Developed by Stargate Entertainment
Johnny Mnemonic	Sega CD	Point-and-click	Unreleased	Cancelled in late 1995

== See also ==
- Sony Computer Entertainment
