= Delta State (TV series) =

French-Canadian animated television series

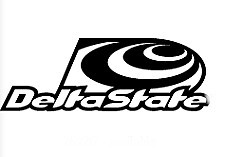
- Based on: Delta State by: Douglas Gayeton; Matt Rockman
- Written by: Vincent Bonjour
- Directed by: Pascal David
- Voices of: Liz Alexander; Dusan Dukic; Ilona Eklin; Nicolas Wright; Larry Day; Sasha Ruiz; Anne Nahabedian
- Theme music composer: Kid Loco
- Composer: Kid Loco
- Countries of origin: Canada; France; Luxembourg; India
- Original languages: English; French
- No. of seasons: 1
- No. of episodes: 26

Production
- Executive producers: Christian Davin; Clément Calvet; Scott Dyer; Emmanuélle Petry; Paul Cadieux; Michael Hirsh
- Running time: 22 minutes
- Production companies: Alphanim; Nelvana (Note: As Deltanim Productions Inc.); DQ Entertainment; LuxAnimation; Cofimage 13

Original release
- Network: The Detour On Teletoon (Canada); France 2 and Canal+ (France)
- Release: September 11, 2004 – February 27, 2005

Delta State is a sci-fi adult animated television series, based on the comic book of the same name by Douglas Gayeton and Matt Rockman featuring four amnesiac roommates with the ability to enter an ethereal realm known as the Delta State. They face the dual tasks of piecing together their past lives and battling a group of Delta State denizens called Rifters, who seek to control the human mind. The main characters are Claire (Ilona Elkin), Martin (Dusan Dukic), Luna (Lizz Alexander), and Philip (Nicholas Wright).

The series first premiered in September 11, 2004 on Teletoon (now as Cartoon Network Canada), the Canadian animation-aimed television network. It is the first animated television series to be entirely rotoscoped, taking over 2 ½ years to complete.

Delta State is a Canadian/French co-production with designs, storyboards, etc., done by Alphanim in Paris, Europe. Shooting and recording were provided by Nelvana (initially Cinar [now as WildBrain]) in Montreal. The series was created by Douglas Gayeton, who also directed the original pilot and wrote the bible for the show.

The show has won the Special Award for a TV program at the Annecy International Animated Film Festival, and the Frames 2004 for Best Asian Production.

The series aired in France on France 2 and Canal+.

== Synopsis ==
Four adult-aged people each become aware that they possess superhuman abilities of the mind, and are charged by their friend and mentor Professor Brodie with saving the world from Rifter forces. Brodie trains them to battle Rifters in the Delta State, a reference to the brain wave pattern achieved during deep sleep. The main characters, Professor Brodie, and the Rifters are able to enter and exit this state of consciousness at will. As in dreams, rules of physics or logic do not necessarily apply; yet, as in lucid dreaming, a measure of control over the situation can be achieved while in this state.

== Characters ==
=== The Group ===
- Main characters (except guy on left)
  Luna Palacios: Red hair in ponytail, 22 years old and of Mexican heritage. Luna has the power of precognition. She is the only one among the group who doesn't have control over her power; her visions of the future appear to her either randomly or shortly before the actual event. Luna is caring, level-headed and mature, and she will often try a more level-headed approach compared to Martin's confrontational attitude. She is also described as shy and reserved. However, it is implied that her personality might have drastically changed after she lost her memories, and she was much more outgoing, carefree and socially confident in her past life. Luna works in a pub where all the characters gather regularly during the series. Before she lost her memories, she was a bank teller at the Bank of Mexico. There was a robbery at the bank and the getaway car hit and killed Carlita, Luna's little sister. There is often tension between her and Martin due, apparently, to their past relationship. She is also the one Phillip prefers to confide in with his more sensitive and personal issues.
- Philip Graff: Shaggy black hair, 20 years old, a perpetually unemployed slacker. He has the power of psychometry, the ability to see the past experiences of selected objects. It is implied that Philip has a one-sided crush on Luna. His mother abandoned him on a bus when he was a baby and he grew up in an orphanage. She's seen in robes being chased by others in matching robes, suggesting a possible cult membership of some kind, and that Philip's birth went against this group's beliefs. He has an aversion to lockers, likely because he spent much of third grade being stuffed into them. It's later revealed that of the four he was the first one found, and that he's the "most special" in the grand scheme of things.
- Claire Donally: Blue hair in buns, 21 years old. She has the power of remote viewing. Luna is her best friend and they have a sisterly bond. Now Claire is Martin's girlfriend, even though at times their relationship is very on-again-off-again. Claire's previous boyfriend before she lost her memories was David, who was murdered by a friend named Thomas who wanted the full share of the treasure he and David had found while scuba diving. Claire can be quick tempered and sensitive, but also very kind and determined. She's shown to be the least capable of dealing with the new life/Rifter situation they're in.
- Martin Gold: Spiked white hair, 21 years old and is Polish heritage. He has the power of telepathy (mind reading). Presently the boyfriend of Claire, though he was Luna's in his past life. Martin tends to be very serious and strict, often insisting the group acts more careful. He can also be short-tempered and easily jealous, and his confrontational and forceful nature sometimes causes problems with his teammates. He was a baseball catcher before a couple of thugs, hired by his own father (for not also pursuing the family practice), broke his arm, ending his career. Unlike Luna, who trusts Brodie and often defends his actions, Martin has more doubts about their mysterious mentor.
- Professor Robert Brodie: The group's guardian and mentor. He was involved in a government project but left. He's shown to be able to hold powerful Rifters like Sven at bay.

=== Rifters ===
- Sven Ragnar: Arguably the most powerful rifter. Commonly assumed to be the "brother" of Maria and heads the acquisition of human minds by rifters. He seeks to kill Brodie, and bears a grudge against Martin. He's able to change his appearance, he doesn't hesitate to kill people, and is able to kill other rifters, in both the Delta State and in reality. His goal and motivation appears to be world domination.
- Maria Ragnar: Though only female of the "bad guys", she has deep feelings for Philip and has put herself in danger for him on more than one occasion. She is a powerful rifter in her own right, including the ability to change her appearance in reality, but harbours a vigorous fear of Sven's power.
- Karla Schneider: The rifter featured in "First Contact" who displeased Sven and was disintegrated for her transgression.
- Professor Stork: A rifter who was expelled by Luna and Philip in "A Case Study."
- Dr. Ludwig Von Hayek: A mad scientist rifter who worked at Icharus, perfecting cold fusion as an unlimited power source for rifters. Von Hayek was destroyed by Martin, Philip, Luna, and Claire in "Fusion."
- Louisa Forterre: The girl Philip has fallen for. Philip expels a rifter from her at the end of "The Girlfriend."
- Aldous Brant: A human possessed by a rifter 15 years until the start of the series. He has Enzio's Rachnosis, a neural degenerative disease, and has less than a year to live. The rifter in Aldous Brant took advantage of a situation to jump into Raymond Woodly, leaving Aldous dying in a coma.
- Raymond Woodly: Aldous Brant's best friend and campaign manager. Woodly became possessed when a rifter jumped into him from Brant. The Rifter was NOT expelled at the end of "Vote Rifter."
- Dr. Van Heusen: A rifter destroyed by Philip, Luna, and Claire in "Cabin Fever."

=== Other ===
- Dan: Luna's boyfriend. He also works with Martin at "Soundz", a music store. He is shown to be a fairly-skilled computer hacker. Luna states her situation truthfully to him, which he simply believes without hesitation or further question.
- Chantal Thomas: A psychic. Brodie described her as "sensitive to the vibrations of the membrane of our reality". She was found and killed by Sven in "The Reading."
- Jack Staffer: A friend of Philip's. They met when they both worked at Icharus, in "Fusion."

== Release ==
The series was released to DVD soon after its telecast began, with three-episode volumes being released intermediately. "First Contact" (episodes 1 – 3) was released on May 16, 2006, followed by "The Reading" (episodes 4 – 6) on October 10, 2006. The first season, containing all thirteen of its episodes, was made available in a two-disc box set on February 13, 2007. The first season was later re-released by KaBoom! Entertainment on October 6, 2009. As of 2009, the releases are now out of print.

In the late summer/early autumn 2010, the complete series became available for download from the iTunes Store, however it was later delisted a year later.

The series is currently available to watch on YouTube via Corus' channel Retro Rerun.

== Production ==
=== The Comic ===
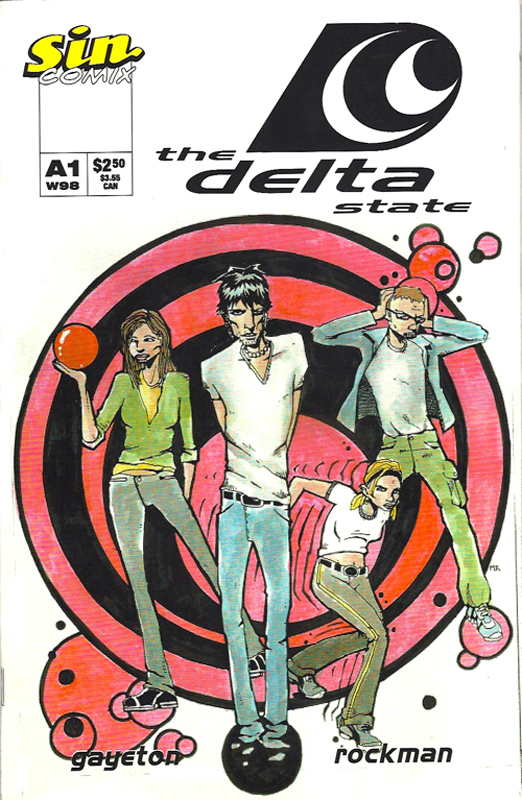
Comic cover

The comic was written by Douglas Gayeton, with artwork by Matt Rockman, in 1997 while both worked at Sunshine Amalgamedia. Before the comic released, the rights to it were bought by Alphanim, who commissioned Gayeton to turn the comic into an animated series, but initially produced by Cinar, but failed due to trials and Nelvana was the final-cut producer. He shot the pilot with friends of his in the US city of Los Angeles on a shoestring budget and used Macromedia Flash for rotoscoped animation. The pilot would be completed in 2000, one year before the release of Waking Life. After writing the original show bible and directing the pilot for the series, Gayeton moved on to other projects, though he remains a fan of the work. As of 2022, The comic and the pilot have yet to be released as they are owned by Alphanim's successor Gaumont Animation.

=== The Series ===
The series utilized rotoscoped animation, shot on a budget of $11 million (CAD) with a multicamera setup directed by Wayne Moss, was done using a blue screen studio in Montreal with minimal props and locations. It was also shot in the 16:9 aspect ratio and converted to fullscreen to stretch out the characters. The actors had black lines drawn on their faces to distinguish noses, eyebrows and jawlines and hair was customized in order to make it easy for the animators. The animation was later done in Paris, directed by Pascal David & Giles Cazaux, which used a mix of Flash, Photoshop & After Effects for the series, with character designs being done by Jan Van Rijsselberge. Initially, the series was renewed for a second season and a theatrical film by Alphanim, however, negotiations with Nelvana were broken down, and the project was cancelled, with Nelvana buying out Alphanim's share of the series.

== Soundtrack ==
The music for the series was composed by French DJ and producer Kid Loco. Only two tracks from the original soundtrack have been released. The first one is the Delta State theme song, which is an extended version of the main theme. The second track is called "Another Snake" and has been released on a compilation CD called "Ethnic Odyssey — Natural Born Travellers" in 2007. Other songs from the show have not been officially released.

== See also ==
- Animism, a similar Canadian animated show for teenagers with mature concepts
