= Space Football: One on One =

1992 video game

- North American cover art
- Developers: Bits Studios; Argonaut Software
- Publishers: Acclaim Japan, Triffix Entertainment
- Designer: Jon Stuart
- Artist: Stephen Robertson
- Composer: Colin Bennun
- Platform: Super NES
- Release: NA: June 1992; JP: November 6, 1992
- Genre: Sports
- Modes: Single-player, multiplayer

Space Football: One on One, known in Japan as Super Linear Ball (スーパーリニアボール), is a video game developed by Bits Studios and released in 1992 exclusively for the Super Nintendo Entertainment System. The game takes place in the future with two athletes attempting to score goals against each other.

== Gameplay ==
The player is directing the ball towards the goal.

Using retro grav hovercraft, these two athletes must gain possession of a hovering ball. There are twelve different drivers to choose from. 32 levels offer different obstacles and level design for players to skilfully move the ball around.

Features included mode 7 scrolling. The player moves the ball up the field by shooting it. Obstacles are thrown in the player's way to block progress. This is to replace the lack of defenders used in an American football game played in the real world. These obstacles include magnetic flux fields that drains the player's energy and spincycles that twist the player out of control. Every background has a science fiction look to it with the stars and the space colony being shown. The goal scoring areas are similar to soccer nets but without the goalkeeper blocking it.

There is a timer announcing the number of time units left in the game. The player is not allowed to hold the ball after four seconds.
