= Johnny Mnemonic (video game) =

1995 video game

- Developer: Propaganda Code
- Publisher: Sony Imagesoft
- Director: Douglas Gayeton
- Producers: Mary Ann Norris; Connie Booth
- Writers: Douglas Gayeton; John Platten
- Composer: Josh Mancell
- Engine: Cineactive
- Platforms: Macintosh, Windows
- Release: May 26, 1995
- Genre: Point-and-click
- Mode: Single-player

Johnny Mnemonic: The Interactive Action Movie is a 1995 point-and-click adventure game published by Sony Imagesoft for Macintosh and Windows. It was released as a tie-in to the film of the same name and developed by Propaganda Code, the gaming division of Propaganda Films. Filming took place at the Ambassador Hotel in Los Angeles, California for fifteen days.

Johnny Mnemonic received mixed reviews from video game critics. After its release, Sony Imagesoft was folded into Sony Computer Entertainment of America and Propaganda Code shut down.

== Gameplay ==
Johnny Mnemonic: The Interactive Action Movie is a point-and-click adventure video game. The game has no user interface displayed, instead changing the aspect ratios on the screen to show when to do any action commands.

== Development ==
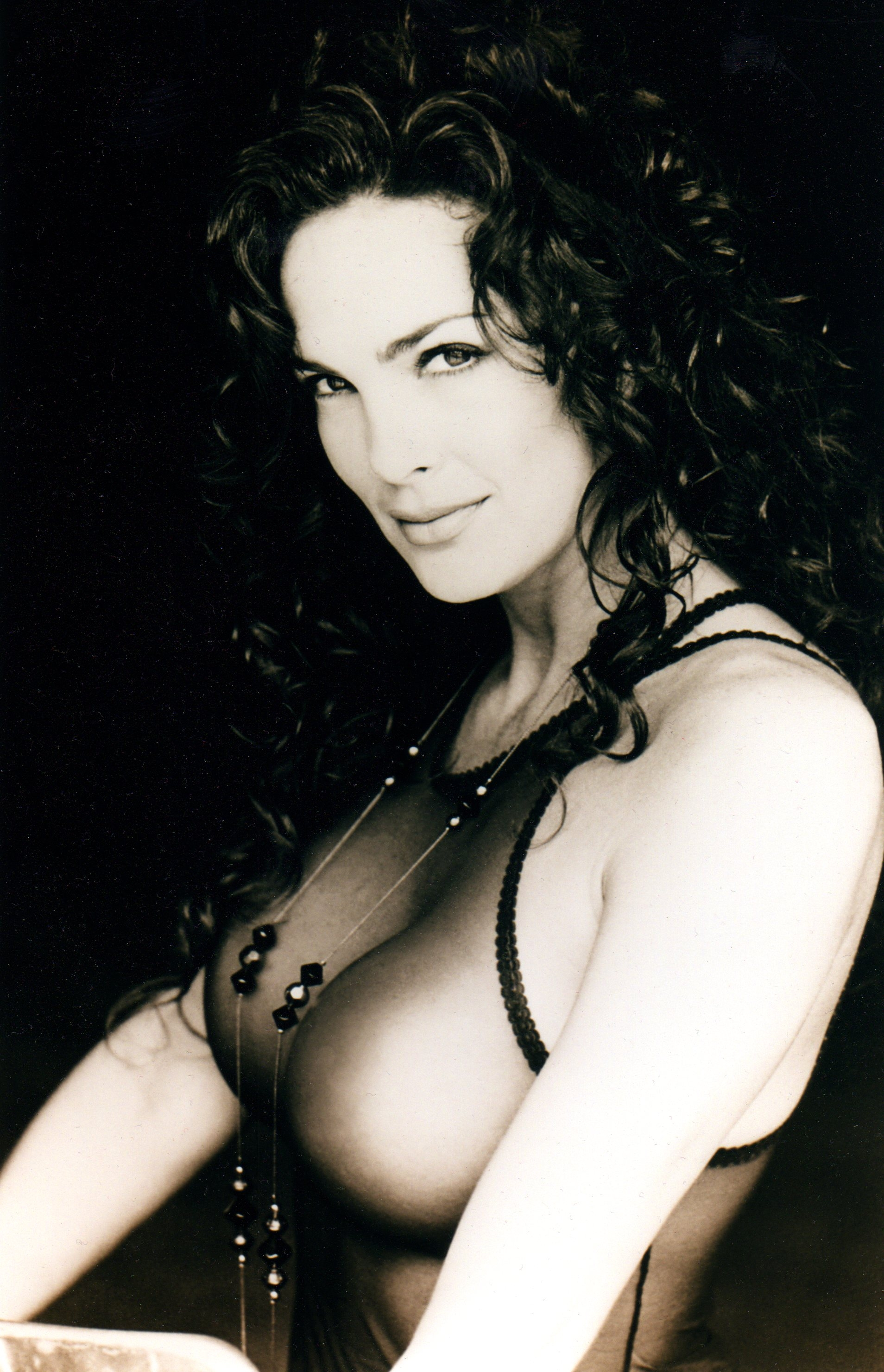
Julie Strain

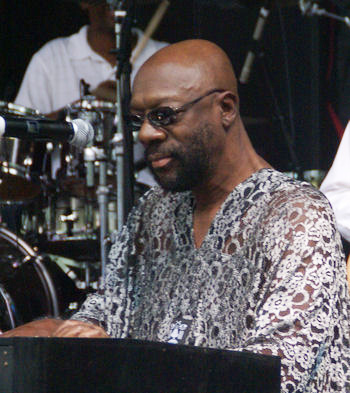
Isaac Hayes

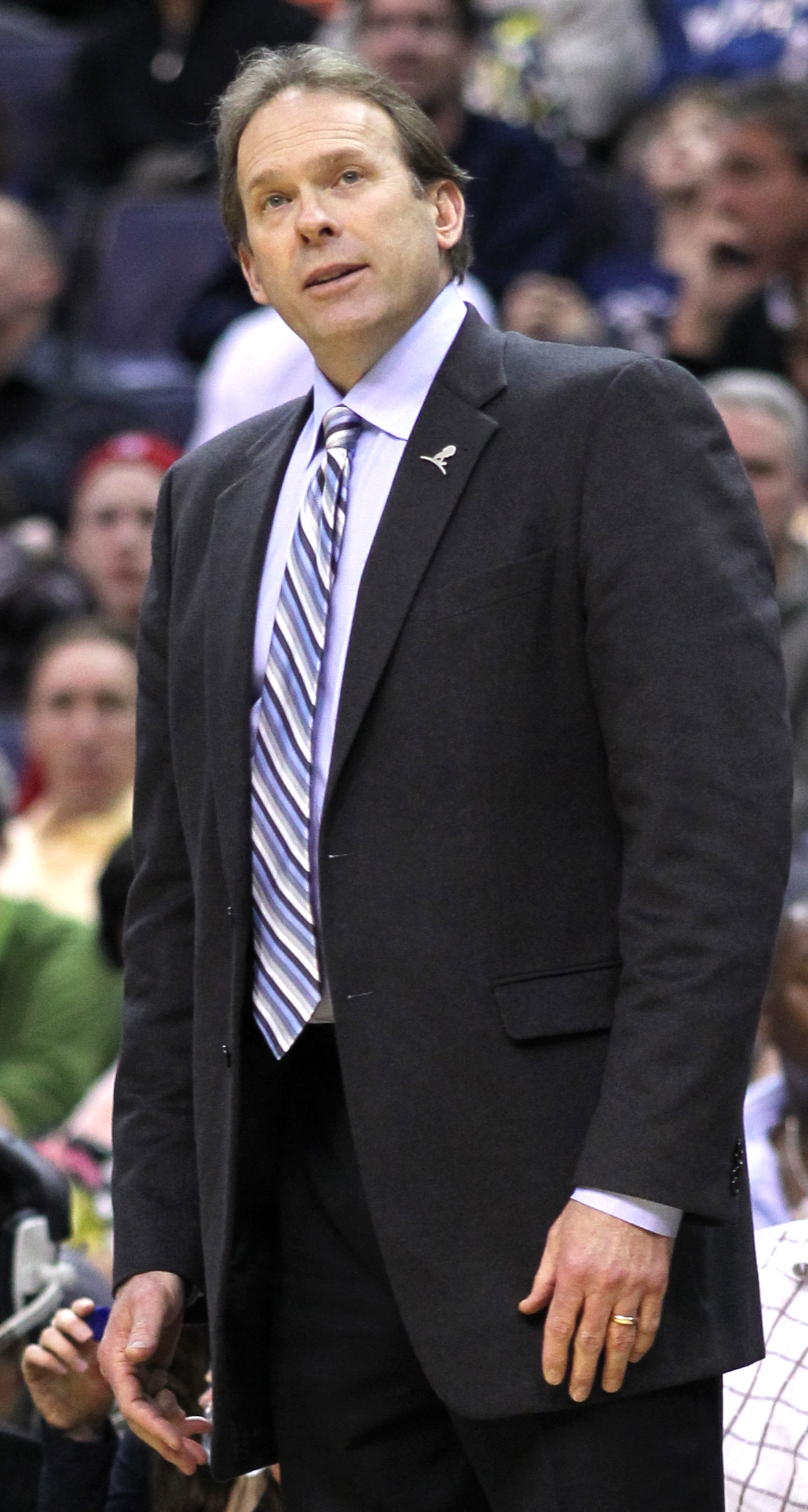
Kurt Rambis

Casting for the game included Penthouse model Julie Strain, singer and actor Issac Hayes, and basketball player Kurt Rambis.

Johnny Mnemonic was developed by Sony Imagesoft. The interactive movie was shot by the production company Propaganda Films, which also filmed commercials for AT&T and Coca-Cola, and in the 1990s, Wild at Heart. Along with shooting the footage for the game, they also developed the game under their unit Propaganda Code. The story was based on a 1981 short story by William Gibson, who had coined the term "cyberspace" and who served as scriptwriter for the film. The video games production, Sony Pictures was making a movie adaption, starring Keanu Reeves. Production costs for filming and tech development reached $3 million.

The script was written by Douglas Gayeton and John Platten. The script numbered roughly 145 pages when completed. It took four weeks to write a script, and Gayeton took into account that he knew he'd be unable to ask for more money for reshoots. The original concept for the game was to use the same sets as the movie, but they were unable to due to multiple issues, including contractual issues and the movie being behind schedule. Filming for the game took place in the Ambassador Hotel in Los Angeles, California. The design for the hotel was done by Jean-Philippe Carp, previously the designer for the French black comedy Delicatessen. Carp used adornments like aquarium table lamps and neon video screens to give the hotel a futuristic look. Filming lasted fifteen days. Seventy camera setups were done for each day of shooting. Executive producer Jonathan Wiedeman noted the potential for continuity issues between scenes due to the multiple branches, which were addressed by having actors tone down any extreme emotional reads. The game saw the first use of the interactive movie engine Cineactive, developed by Evolutionary Publishing, which Sony licensed for use in the title.

Christopher Gartin was cast in the role of Johnny Mnemonic. His previous work included an appearance on the soap opera Melrose Place. Other cast members included singer and actor Issac Hayes, former Los Angeles Lakers player Kurt Rambis, Doug Llewelyn from The People's Court, and Penthouse model and 1993's Pet of the Year Julie Strain.

Josh Mancell was the composer for the game. The soundtrack to the game did not feature any of the music used in the soundtrack for the movie. Columbia Records vice president of soundtracks Maureen Crowe said that they tried to incorporate the music used in the movie, but the game was too far ahead. She also explained the two works were thematically different, and the same music might not have worked for both. The band Devo was brought on to do the music instead.

Interactive movies such as Johnny Mnemonic were often created out of necessity, due to CD-ROMs being forced to compress long movie sequences into low-quality files, which developers would combine with graphics, sound, and text in what Techtsy describes as "the collage technique".

Steven Yee, director of marketing for Sony New Technologies, commented that the film, the CD-ROM, and an Internet game entitled Nethunt (where players traversed websites to answer questions) "amount to three different views of the Internet and Gibson's short story".

== Release ==
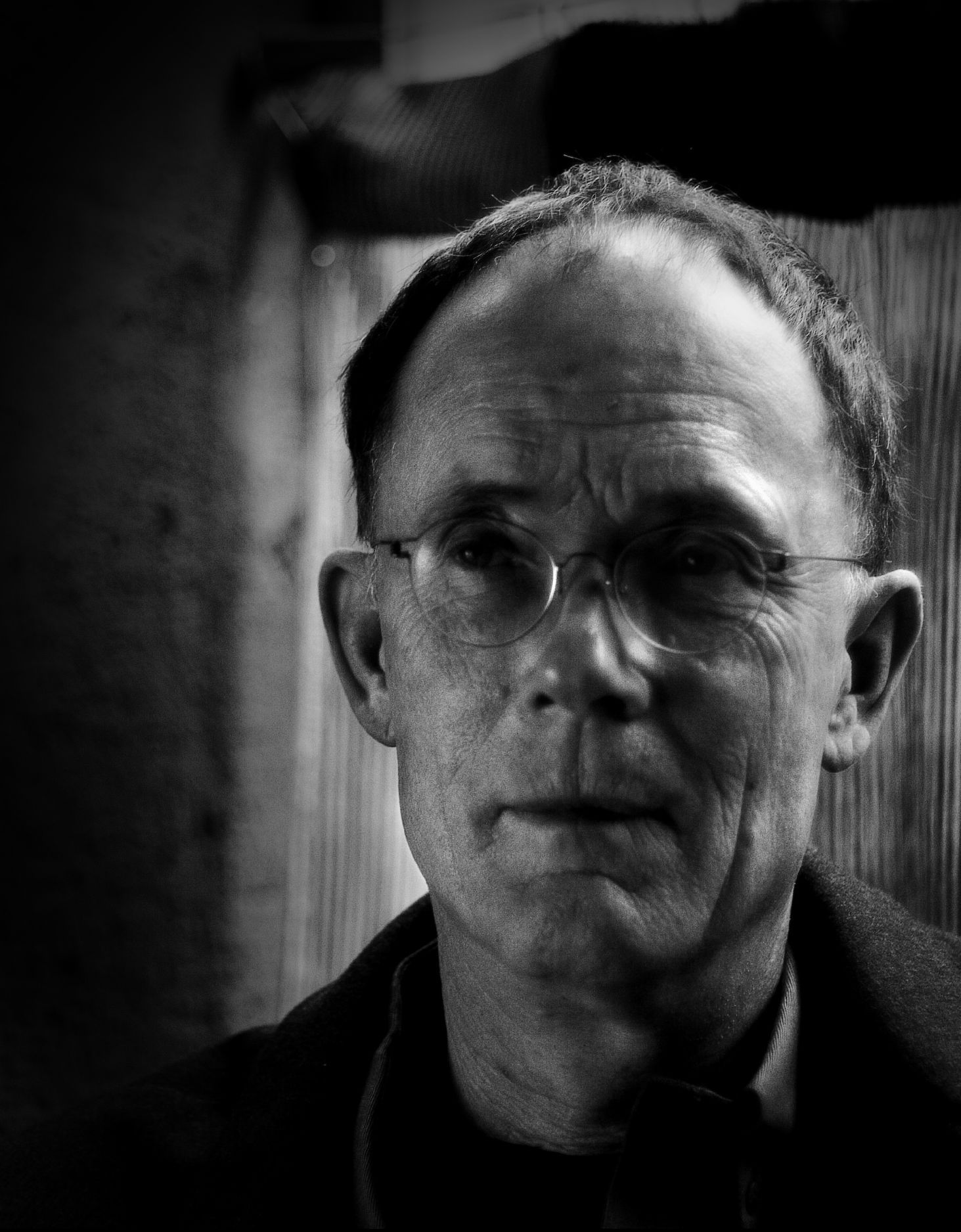
Original story author William Gibson helped promote Johnny Mnemonic.

The game was first announced in a pre-launch on March 15, 1995, at the New Media Expo at the Writers Guild booth. It was later shown at the first E3 in May the same year. Sean McGowan, an analyst for research boutique Gerard Klauer Mattison & Co., estimated that the game needed to sell 100,000 copies to break even.

William Gibson helped promote the game by making an on-line appearance on CompuServe and ZiffNet on May 18, 1995. The game was shipped on May 26, 1995. Shortly after its release, Douglas Gayeton left Propaganda Films to work on other projects. The developer Propaganada Code also closed, with Johnny Mnemonic as their only game. In July 1995, Sony Imagesoft was folded into Sony Computer Entertainment of America due to Sony Corporation of America restructuring their video games operations to prepare for the release of the PlayStation. The game was planned as a launch title for the PlayStation but was never released. A version for the Sega CD was also announced but was also unreleased.

== Reception ==
Reception

Review scores
Publication	Score
AllGame	2/5
Computer Gaming World	2/5
Edge	3/10
PC Gamer (US)	80%
Electronic Entertainment	C−
Entertainment Weekly	B
MacUser	1/5

Johnny Mnemonic received polarized reviews from video game critics. Christopher Allen from Allgame described the game as "a painful example of why FMV so often fails to achieve significant interactive gameplay." The Los Angeles Times felt the game found ways to make the generally "deadly" genre of interactive movies interesting and exciting. The Seattle Times felt it was a "breakthrough" as the first electronic game to be considered a true interactive movie with Hollywood standards. Andy Grieser from The Chicago Tribune was so engrossed in the "addictive" title that he began shouting out loud during the fight sequences.

Charles Ardai for Computer Gaming World remarked that the game suffered from "Dragon's Lair syndrome", noting that the player is only given one chance of success or else clicking the mouse too early or too late causes a game over.

Hardcore Gamer considered the game to be one of the lowest points for publisher Sony Imagesoft.
