= Bits Studios =

Video game development studio

- Industry: Video games
- Founder: Fouad "Foo" Katan
- Headquarters: London, UK

Bits Studios was a British video game developer. The company has had over 30 titles published over the United States, Europe and Asia on multiple platforms. Bits Studios' parent company, PlayWize, sold off all assets and technologies held by the group in 2008, due to poor trading results. As a result, the company no longer has any trading operations.

== Games developed ==
Year	Title	System	Publisher
1990	Chase H.Q.	Game Boy	Taito
1990	Loopz	NES	Mindscape
1991	Robin Hood: Prince of Thieves	Game Boy	Virgin Games
1991	Terminator 2: Judgment Day	Game Boy	LJN
1991	R-Type	Game Boy	IREM
1992	The Amazing Spider-Man 2	Game Boy	LJN
1992	Spider-Man vs. The Kingpin	Game Gear	Sega
1992	Castelian	NES, Game Boy	Triffix
1992	GunForce	Super NES	Irem
1992	Spider-Man: Return of the Sinister Six	Master System, NES	Flying Edge, LJN
1992	R-Type II	Game Boy	IREM
1992	Space Football: One on One	Super NES	Triffix
1993	Alien^{3}	Game Boy	LJN (Acclaim Entertainment)
1993	The Amazing Spider-Man 3: Invasion of the Spider-Slayers	Game Boy	LJN (Acclaim Entertainment)
1993	Terminator 2: Judgment Day	Mega Drive/Genesis, Super NES	Flying Edge, LJN
1993	Saigo no Nindou: Ninja Spirit	Game Boy	Irem
1994	Last Action Hero	Game Boy, Game Gear, Mega Drive/Genesis, Super NES	Sony Imagesoft
1994	Dream TV	Super NES	Triffix
1994	Mary Shelley's Frankenstein	Mega Drive/Genesis, Super NES	Sony Imagesoft
1994	No Escape	Mega Drive/Genesis	Psygnosis
1994	Wolverine: Adamantium Rage	Super NES	LJN (Acclaim Entertainment)
1994	Genocide 2	Super NES	Kemco
1995	The Itchy & Scratchy Game	Super NES, Game Gear	Acclaim Entertainment
1995	T-Mek	32X, Windows	Midway Games
1995	Maximum Roadkill	MS-DOS	Take-Two Interactive
1996	Nihilist	Windows	Phillips Media
1999	R-Type DX	Game Boy Color	Nintendo
2000	Warlocked	Game Boy Color	Nintendo of America
2000	Virtual Athlete (VA)	PC/Online	Gamesmagnet
2001	Lab Rat	PC/Online	Gamesmagnet
2002	Die Hard: Vendetta	GameCube, PlayStation 2, Xbox	NDA Productions; Sierra Entertainment (Vivendi Universal Games)
2003	Sega Arcade Gallery	Game Boy Advance	Sega, THQ
2003	Rogue Ops	GameCube, PlayStation 2, Xbox	Kemco
2005	Constantine	PlayStation 2, Windows, Xbox	THQ
2006	Payout Poker & Casino	PlayStation Portable	Namco Bandai Games

== Unreleased/cancelled games ==
Title	System
Fido Dido	Super NES
The Itchy & Scratchy Game	Mega Drive/Genesis
Jet Force Gemini	Game Boy Color
Thieves World	Nintendo 64
Riqa	Nintendo 64
Die Hard 64	Nintendo 64
Wizards	Game Boy Advance
Jet Riders	Game Boy Advance
