= Molotov Alva and His Search for the Creator =

2007 American documentary film

Molotov Alva and His Search for the Creator: A Second Life Odyssey, originally titled My Second Life: The Video Diaries of Molotov Alva, is a 2007 American documentary film created by Douglas Gayeton. Molotov Alva tells the story of a man's passage from his real (analog) life in Petaluma, California into a new (digital) existence inside Linden Lab's virtual world Second Life. The production was filmed entirely in Second Life using machinima, the use of real-time 3-D graphics engines to create animated films.

Molotov Alva was commissioned and co-produced in 2006 by Submarine Channel, a Dutch internet production company, and co-produced by VPRO, a Dutch television broadcaster. The first dispatch, titled "Out of His Skin", was placed on YouTube in February 2007. A rough cut of the documentary premiered at Toronto's Hot Docs Film Festival in 2007. It subsequently appeared in festivals around the world, including the Tokyo International Film Festival, the Rome Film Festival and SXSW. The North American broadcast rights were purchased by HBO Documentary Films in August, 2007, marking the first time a US television network purchased a series which premiered on YouTube.

The first six episodes of Molotov Alva and His Search for the Creator premiered on Cinemax on May 15, 2008. The final four episodes were distributed via Video On Demand, iTunes, and YouTube, making it the first simultaneous multi-platform distribution of an American television series.

== Plot ==
A man leaves his Petaluma, California home and enters a virtual world called Second Life as an avatar named Molotov Alva. He arrives with no possessions, not even clothing. He begins by building his own home and furnishing it with objects he discovers during his travels. Alva decides that his new home is merely a trap, one that keeps him tied to memories of the life he'd just left. Molotov eventually gets rid of his home and continues on his journey, where he meets a hobo named Orhalla Zander, who introduces the "Five Ways of the Seeker".

Molotov and Orhalla search for the Creator of Second Life. Their journey brings them into contact with Gorean sex slaves, Cyberpunks and Furries. Despite these encounters, Molotov and Orhalla fail in their search.

Molotov decides to search for a mate and settle down. Various misadventures ensue until Molotov finally meets Abigail. They set up house together but are continually troubled by their inability to have physical intimacy. Orhalla ultimately appears with news that he's found the Creator. Orhalla ultimately brings Molotov to the Oracle, who explains that there is no one single creator of Second Life, but that it is, instead, a world made by its users, each of whom is the Creator.

Having solved the riddle of the Creator, Molotov sets out to become one himself. The high demand for his products attracts the attention of a large company, which crushes him with their mass-produced goods. Molotov tries to escape to a desert island, only to find that the corporations have made it even there.

Molotov's anger with this virtual world's shortcomings leads him to become a “griefer”. He joins a gang of them and takes part in a number of attacks on other members of the virtual world until deciding that such aggression is ultimately pointless.

Molotov reconnects with Abigail and they rekindle their relationship. The two even consider starting a family, but after Molotov realizes that he is immortal he abandons the thought of having children. For the first time, he misses his real world life. Abigail announces that she has found a way out of this virtual world and leaves. Molotov realizes that Abigail is the only real thing he's found in this virtual world and follows after her.
