= ESPN SpeedWorld (video game) =

1994 racing video game

- Sega Genesis cover art
- Developer(s): Sony Imagesoft
- Publisher(s): Sony Imagesoft
- Designer(s): Vincent Weeks; Phillip Weeks; Bob Gordon; Mark Lyons; Christopher Whaley
- Platform(s): Super NES; Sega Genesis
- Release: Sega Genesis: NA: 1994
- Genre(s): Racing
- Mode(s): Single-player, multiplayer Composition : Rex Baca and Joe Hight

ESPN SpeedWorld is a Super NES and Sega Genesis video game that was released in 1994 exclusively for North America based on the television series of the same name. The title screen of the video game was partially inspired by the 1993 running of the First Union 400 racing event; which occurred on April 18, 1993. The real-life drivers from the mid-1990s are missing because the game only has an ESPN license and not an official NASCAR license.

== Gameplay ==
This is a race occurring at Daytona (Florida) International Speedway.

Players control NASCAR Winston Cup stock cars as they do laps around various oval tracks, road courses, and superspeedways that are based on the actual NASCAR circuits of the 1990s. All the stock cars in the game have the capability to go up to 200 miles per hour (approximately 322 kilometers per hour). The object of the game is to get as close to first place as possible. This game uses Dr. Jerry Punch and an interactive pit crew to simulate the feeling of racing during the 1993 Winston Cup season. Like most racing games, being in the top positions gives the player more points than being in the bottom positions. Stock cars can be customized with a choice of colors and styles.

== Reception ==
Reviewing the Super NES version, GamePro described the game as "fast, smart, and flat-out fun", praising the inclusion of elements from the TV show, the customization options, and the impressive graphics. Their review of the Genesis version described it as "virtually identical" to the Super NES version.
