= ESPN Baseball Tonight =

1994 video game

- Super NES box art
- Developers: Park Place Productions; Stormfront Studios (MS-DOS); Sony Imagesoft (Sega CD)
- Publisher: Sony Imagesoft
- Platforms: MS-DOS, Sega CD, Sega Genesis, Super Nintendo Entertainment System
- Release: Sega CD: NA: 1994; EU: 1994; Super NES: NA: May 1994; MS-DOS: NA: November 1, 1994; Sega Genesis: NA: June 1994
- Genre: Sports
- Modes: Single-player, multiplayer

ESPN Baseball Tonight is a 1994 baseball video game for the MS-DOS, Sega CD, Sega Genesis, and Super Nintendo Entertainment System.

The cartridge versions was developed by Park Place Productions, while Sony Imagesoft's internal development team handled development for the Sega CD version amidst troubles at Park Place.

== Summary ==
The game was licensed by MLB, but not by the Players Association, so while actual team names and logos are used, no player names are in the game.

The project's lead programmers were Alexander Ehrath and Russel Shanks. The two lead programmers wrote the game's simulation engine from scratch. The game featured video clips of Chris Berman and play-by-play audio from Dan Patrick.

Little Caesars Enterprises, Inc. got involved with the game's development, seeing marketing synergy between baseball fans and pizza eaters. The pizza chain rolled out a large promotion to coincide with the game's launch, including point-of-purchase material at 4,500 stores; a mail-in offer for an ESPN "Best of Sports" videotape; and print advertising. The director of marketing for Sony called what Little Caesars received "a new method to reach families and men, 18–34, in a nontraditional, nonintrusive way." The stadium walls in-game featured large Little Caesars advertising.

The PC version was one of the early games available solely on CD-ROM. In addition to the single-game, season, and playoff modes, there is also a Home Run Derby mode that evaluates the player's final score from ballerina (with a 0% accuracy rate) to hall of famer (with an accuracy rate of 95–100%) depending on the number of home runs successfully completed.

It was the first in a series of ESPN-themed sports games. The next to be released was ESPN Sunday Night NFL.

== Critical reception ==
ESPN Baseball Tonight mainly received negative reviews. Reviewing the Genesis version, GamePro said it "offers great graphics and sound, but it falls way too short in fun. ... If you're a die-hard baseball fan or a beginner, steer clear of this cart. It'll only frustrate you."

In Entertainment Weekly magazine, columnist Bob Strauss said that the design of the PC version was "appealing enough", but that it plunked players down into "shoddiest baseball simulation" he'd seen, with "pixelated generic-looking players; awkward, superfluous voice commentary; digitalized computer-generated and chroma-keyed or CSO technology-wise videos and a static interface that makes live baseball seem like the invasion of Normandy." He strongly preferred HardBall! '95 instead. Other reviews complained of its size. It weighed in at 54 MB on the PC (a very large file for early 1995 – 23 MB comprised the video clips of Berman). The Library Journal review said, "We strongly recommend a new storage algorithm for this one!"

== See also ==
- MLB Pennant Race, Sony's successor for PlayStation
