= ESPN National Hockey Night (video game) =

1994 video game

- Sega Genesis version cover art
- Developer(s): Sony Imagesoft; Stormfront Studios (DOS)
- Publisher(s): Sony Imagesoft
- Platform(s): Super NES, Sega Genesis, Sega CD, DOS
- Release: Genesis: NA: November 1994; Sega CD: NA: November 1994; Super NES: NA: December 1994
- Genre(s): Traditional ice hockey simulation
- Mode(s): Single-player, multiplayer

ESPN National Hockey Night is a multiplatform traditional ice hockey simulation video game for the Super NES, Sega Genesis, Sega CD, and personal computers with MS-DOS capabilities.

== Gameplay ==
Like most ESPN games, there is an exhibition mode, a season mode, and a playoff mode. Most of the notable NHL players from the 1990s are included; though their real names are not used, the players' jersey numbers are matched up with the '93-'94 stats of the real world players who wore those numbers.

== Reception ==
GamePro gave the Genesis version a mixed review. They highly praised the ability to switch between vertical and side views, the season mode options, and the adjustable difficulty settings, but criticized the music and "soupy" controls. They concluded that the game is good overall, but overshadowed by NHL 95, which came out at the same time.

Next Generation reviewed the Sega CD version of the game, rating it three stars out of five, and stated that "ESPN NHL is good, very good, but it is not going to give EA's series anything to worry about, at least not for the moment."

== See also ==
- NHL FaceOff, Sony's successor for the PlayStation
