= ESPN Sunday Night NFL =

1994 video game

- Super NES cover art
- Developers: Ringler Studios; Absolute Entertainment
- Publisher: Sony Imagesoft
- Platforms: Super NES, Sega CD, Sega Genesis
- Release: Super NES, Sega CD: NA: November 1994; Genesis: NA: 1994
- Genre: Sports (football)
- Modes: Single-player, multiplayer

ESPN Sunday Night NFL is a sports video game that was released for the Super NES, Sega CD, and Sega Genesis in 1994.

== Summary ==
Like in other football games, the player must run, pass, and/or kick a ball across a regulation field spanning 100 yards (91 m) in order to score points.

Weather conditions would vary, making the game have an element of realism that manipulates the football and the players. Chris Berman's voice was provided as the announcer of every game that the player participated in. All 28 teams in the NFL during the early 1990s were in the game. However, the names of the individual players are not used due to the development company not being able to acquire the full NFLPA license.

It was the second in a chain of ESPN-themed sports games, following ESPN Baseball Tonight.

== Reception ==
Reviewing the Genesis version, GamePro commented that ESPN Sunday Night NFL "lacks the well-crafted execution of Madden '95 or any number of other football games." They particularly criticized the lack of real players, the players' identical performance, the poor graphics, and the limited sound effects. Their review of the Super NES version declared it to be an improvement over the Genesis version, with better graphics, sounds, and playability. However, they stated the game is still mediocre in all those factors, particularly noting the excessive flicker and simplistic gameplay which appear in both versions of the game.

== See also ==
- ESPN Sunday Night Football
- NFL GameDay, Sony's successor for the PlayStation
