= Mary Shelley's Frankenstein (video game) =

1994 video game

- Developer: Bits Studios
- Publisher: Sony Imagesoft
- Composers: Ronnie Shahmoon; Shahid Ahmad
- Platforms: Super NES, Genesis
- Release: NA: November 4, 1994
- Genre: Action
- Mode: Single-player

Mary Shelley's Frankenstein is an action platformer video game based on the 1994 film of the same name, an adaptation of Mary Shelley's 1818 novel Frankenstein; or, The Modern Prometheus.

A different game sharing the same name was developed by Psygnosis for the Sega CD, this version is instead a graphic adventure game with 2D fighting combat.

== Plot ==
The player controls Frankenstein's monster as he stomps through the streets of Ingolstadt, Bavaria, in the year 1793 seeking revenge against a certain man named Victor for rejecting him once he was created. Since he is a product of artificial manufacturing, he is condemned and declared a monster by peasants and soldiers. The common folks that strive to kill Frankenstein's monster are highly ignorant about modern science and believe that he is truly a demon.

The game follows the plot of the movie closely with some alterations or padding, most notably the removal of Elizabeth's death scene yet her resurrection as an abomination is kept and she is fought as a boss that dies after being accidentally set on fire.

== Gameplay ==
The player uses a wooden stick to ward off enemies. The stick that Frankenstein's monster carries can be put on fire if swung towards the fire. Frankenstein also has an additional attack; a blue ball of negative energy that pops up when the player releases the button. Peasants in the game can either be male or female; soldiers are always male. The female peasants attack with pots while the male peasants attack with melee weapons. However, the soldiers (men dressed in red) attack the player with musket shots. Simple puzzles involving switches and pulleys must be solved to progress within the levels.

== Reception ==
Reception

Review score
Publication	Score
AllGame	3.5/5 (SNES)

Entertainment Weekly gave the game a D−: "Welcome to 'Hollywired', where you play turgid, half-baked videogame adaptations of turgid, half-baked movies. About the only interesting thing Sony did with Mary Shelley's Frankenstein was to cast it as a role-playing, rather than an action, game, but it's still awful: Even fans of the Kenneth Branagh movie will find it hard to get past the first scene, in which Frankenstein's monster hobbles around the doctor's lab like an aged pensioner looking for his Social Security check. It's saved from total failure by this line from the enclosed tip sheet: 'If you come across the flies, use the manure to get past them'".
