= Rogue Ops =

2003 video game

- North American PlayStation 2 cover art
- Developer: Bits Studios
- Publisher: Kemco
- Platforms: GameCube; PlayStation 2 Xbox
- Release: NA: October 28, 2003; PAL: February 6, 2004
- Genre: Stealth
- Mode: Single-player

Rogue Ops is a stealth-based action-adventure video game developed by Bits Studios and published by Kemco for the Xbox, GameCube and PlayStation 2 in 2003.

In Rogue Ops the player assumes the role of Nikki Connors, an ex-Green Beret whose husband and child are killed by Omega 19, a brutal terrorist organization. She then joins Phoenix, an almost as brutal counter-terrorism organization to seek revenge.

The game's minimal marketing efforts dealt mainly with the attractive appearance of its computer-generated heroine. Compared unfavorably to the more established Metal Gear and Splinter Cell series, Rogue Ops received mixed reviews from critics and did not fare well commercially.

== Gameplay ==
Rogue Ops is a third-person stealth-based action adventure title in the vein of Splinter Cell series. Many levels allow for a variety of tactics to be used, so often players may shoot everything that moves or simply sneak through entire missions. However, a few missions will require that no enemy alarms be set off, meaning players will have to dispose of enemies quietly and hide the bodies from detection. As in the Metal Gear and Splinter Cell series, a variety of spy gadgetry (fly cam, retinal scanner, etc.) and weapons (throwing stars, sniper rifle, remote-controlled mines, etc.) are used during the various missions, and hand-to-hand combat is involved during close encounters with the enemy.

== Plot ==
Two years ago during a trip to Istanbul, Turkey, Nicola "Nikki" Conners, a former Green Beret, witnesses her husband and young child die in a car bomb explosion at the hands of Omega 19, a brutal terrorist organization. A short time after, Jacobson, the head of a mysterious counterterrorism group known as the Phoenix, reveals Nikki's deceased husband, Michael, was a member of Phoenix, and recruits Nikki as she seeks revenge for her family's death.

After two years of vigorous training, Nikki completes her final part with the help of Jonah. Her first mission takes her to a countryside in Spain to retrieve a journal that contains all the illegal activities Omega 19 has committed. However, the journal is stored in the villa of Henry Van Clief, an illegal weapons dealer and member of Omega 19. Once she arrives, she witnesses the death of a fellow Phoenix agent at the hands of Van Clief's men. Nikki plants three C4 charges (on the car, in the basement, and in the kitchen, respectively) and detonates them, alarming Van Clief. She gives chase to him to the basement of the villa, where Nikki kills Van Clief and retrieves the journal.

During a mission briefing, Jacobson states an infiltration team was sent to Uzbekistan to destroy an Omega 19 base, only to disappear and never be heard from again. The Uzbekistan government refuses to assist Phoenix unless they can recover an artifact that was stolen from them by the British Empire 100 years ago. This takes Nikki to a museum in England to steal the ancient artifact and replace it with a fake. However, as she prepares to acquire the artifact, she informs the team the object she sees is a fake, and Peter, Phoenix's intelligence expert, informs her of Omega 19 agents having acquired the artifact for their own purposes. Nikki kills the escaping terrorists and retrieves the artifact.

The team hands the artifact to the Uzbekistan government officials, and they reveal the last known location of Phoenix's strike team, at a military base near a silo. Nikki finds the leader of the missing strike team inside the silo, where the captive tells Nikki of a nuclear weapon Omega 19 plan to release, which is designed to release an electromagnetic pulse in space, wiping out all the computer systems in the United States, leading to an economic apocalypse. As Nikki leaves to stop the weapon from launching, the strike team leader is killed. She apparently kills Serena, one of Omega 19's top female assassins, and cause the missile to explode inside the silo, but this gives her 3 minutes to escape before the place explodes. She leaves the scene in the nick of time.

Hiding in a Phoenix safehouse in Hungary, Nikki infiltrates the Magyar Club in Budapest to interrogate and kill Augustin Varga, the Hungarian Minister of Defense, who is a key player in supplying Omega 19 with the doomsday weapon. However, the foreigner assigned to help Nikki was captured, but she kills them and rescues the foreigner. Nikki finds Varga, where he talks about the Stauffer Bank. She kills Varga, and escapes back to the safe house.

Nikki travels to the Stauffer Bank in Switzerland to obtain information on the connections between Stauffer and Omega 19. She enters the highly secured Bank via the sewers, where it is revealed $60 million is hidden in the bank, so she is ordered to remove the bonds. During the mission, Serena is alive and well, and this exposes Omega 19's collaboration with Stauffer. Nikki obtains the bonds, but is ambushed by Serena and her operatives. She incapacitates Serena once again and heads back to the States.

In San Diego, Nikki suspects a mole in the Phoenix organization, though Jacobson denies the allegations. She is commissioned to investigate Omega 19's current plans inside a shipping company and to find an agent with knowledge of Omega 19. She disguises herself as a scientist as a means to steal a security card from a technician and advance deeper into the shipping company. Serena reappears, and Omega 19 plans to use a nerve agent into a tanker. Nikki enters a lab, where she acquires a sample of the toxin, but as she does this, three technicians accidentally convert the toxin into a liquid form, killing them instantly. Nikki escapes certain death, and disables the tanker carrying the toxin. Angered by this, Serena reveals she was the one that killed Nikki's family. Nikki kills Serena once and for all.

Nikki makes her way to Siberia, where Jacobson tells her Michael was ordered to end an Omega 19 operation in Turkey, but pulled him from the mission due to Nikki and her child being present, but not before a Russian government official commissioned Serena to kill Michael. At a secret military base in Siberia, Nikki hands the vials to the doctor, who is revealed to be Peter, the mole in Phoenix the whole time. He betrays Nikki and she is imprisoned, but not before she got infected with a bio-virus. She escapes her confinement, destroys the remaining samples of the bio virus, and escapes Omega 19, passing out aboard the helicopter there after.

At an infirmary, Nikki is cured thanks to Phoenix separating the virus from her system and using her blood as an antidote. Much to Nikki's dismay, Jacobson sends a strike team to Omega 19's base in the Caspian Sea. Nikki knocks out Cody and she goes to the Caspian Sea to kill Peter and the Russian for good. Fighting her way through the base, she finds Peter and the Russian, whereas the Russian commanders a prototype android to finish Nikki. She outwits and destroys the android. On the helipad, the Russian programs a much larger version of the android to combat Nikki, but she outsmarts the Russian and destroys the android. The Russian begs for mercy, but Nikki kills him with a headshot. She tells Peter she is leaving Phoenix, but Peter reveals her daughter is still alive. Startled by this, Nikki shoots him in the leg, and as she prepares to kill Peter for betraying Phoenix, Jacobson arrives, and a Phoenix strike team surrounds Nikki, ending the game on a cliffhanger.

== Reception ==
Reception for the game has been mixed, with the Xbox version receiving the best reviews, the PS2 version mediocre, and the GameCube version receiving the worst.

On Metacritic, the game holds scores of 65/100 for the GameCube version based on 21 reviews, 61/100 for the PlayStation 2 version based on 26 reviews, and 63/100 for the Xbox version based on 24 reviews. On GameRankings, the game holds scores of 65.13% for the GameCube version based on 25 reviews, 63.16% for the PlayStation 2 version based on 33 reviews, and 62.20% for the Xbox version based on 37 reviews.

In 2009, GamesRadar included it among the games "with untapped franchise potential", commenting: "Though reviews were fairly mixed, Rogue Ops was surprisingly good, and even managed to add a little something to the Splinter Cell and Metal Gear dominated stealth genre."
