= Douglas Gayeton =

American artist

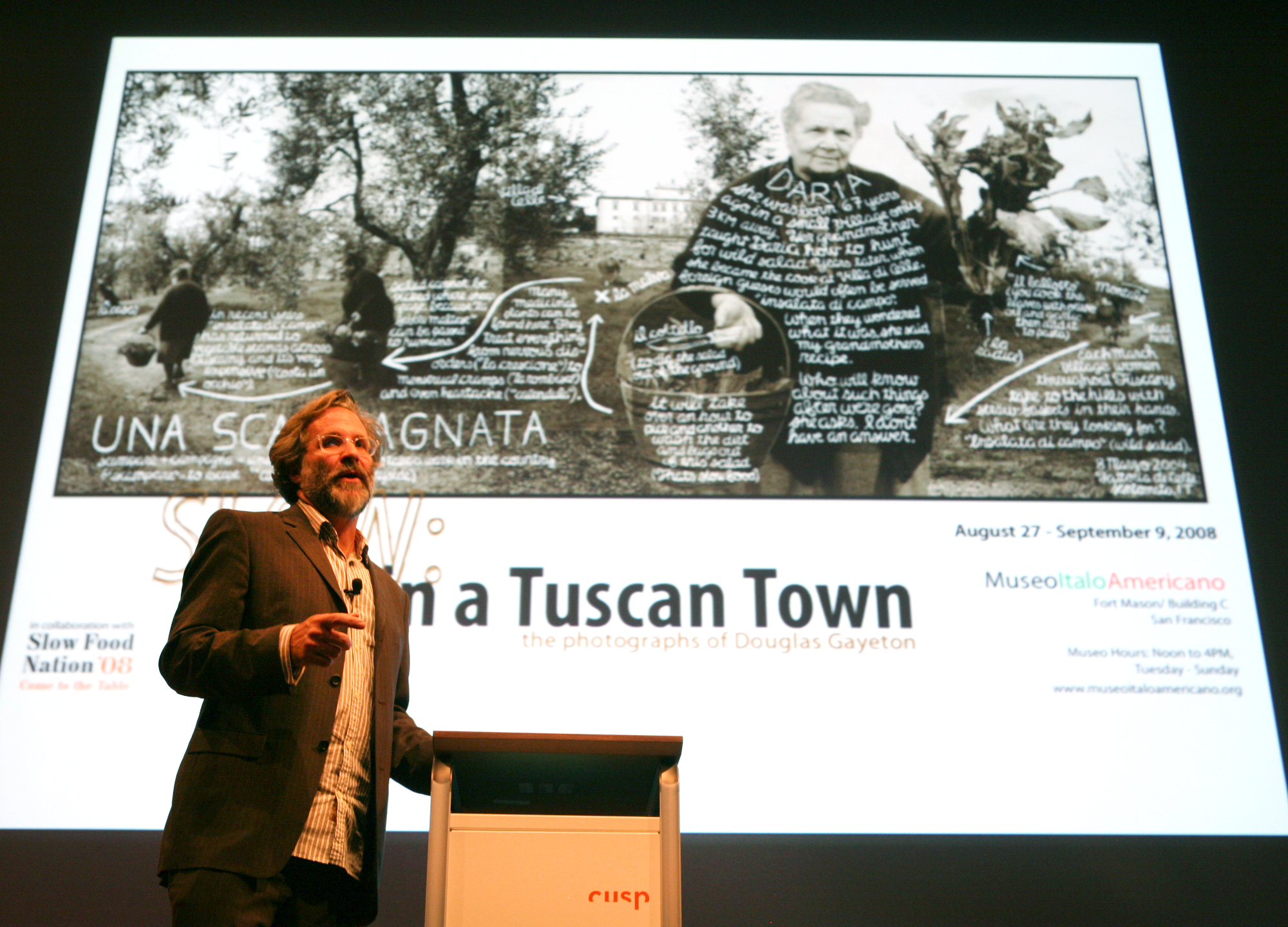
Douglas Gayeton presenting at Cusp Conference 2008, Chicago, IL

Douglas Gayeton is an American multimedia artist, filmmaker, writer, and photographer with ties to farming in Sonoma County, California and photography in Pistoia, a medieval Tuscan town in North Central Italy.

He is the author of Slow: Life in a Tuscan Town and LOCAL: The new Face of Food and Farming in America.

Gayeton's noteworthy film productions credits include: 'Delta State', 'Johnny Mnemonic: The Interactive Action Movie', Know Your Food, a film series on food and farming produced for PBS, Growing Organic, a docuseries on organics in partnership with the United States Department of Agriculture. Gayeton is also the creator of Molotov Alva and His Search for the Creator: A Second Life Odyssey.

== Early life ==
Douglas Gayeton received his BA in Literature and Writing from the University of California, San Diego in 1983, where he studied under dramatists Adele Edling Shank and Alan Schneider. Under the guidance of Reinhard Lettau he also founded the literary magazine Birdcage Review, which featured contributions from a mix of students and notable composers, writers and artists, including Ernst Krenek, Eleanor Antin, Robert Creeley, and David Hockney (who provided artwork for the Fall 1982 cover).

== Career ==
=== Prior to 2k ===
Gayeton directed La Entrada, a full-length documentary on the lives of Mexican migrant workers traveling to the US. The film was produced by and later aired on KPBS. A transcript of interviews the filmmaker conducted with key immigration figures in the US and Mexico while making the film were cited by Congress and read into the Congressional Record during the drafting of the Immigration Reform and Control Act of 1986.

Gayeton abandoned his Masters at the USC School of Cinematic Arts in 1985 to start a production company called Brass Ball after receiving startup funding from Quincy Jones's Qwest Records (ironically, he later returned to the school as a Visiting Professor).

A series of experimental films made with Italian music group Minox led to Gayeton signing with Satellite Films, a division of Propaganda Films in 1992. His making of a music video for the band Semisonic is comically detailed in So You Wanna Be a Rock & Roll Star by Jacob Slichter.

In 1993 Gayeton directed Tomorrow, the first documentary about interactive television. The film featured interviews with Bill Gates, John Malone, Barry Diller, Sumner Redstone, Geraldine Laybourne and others.

Gayeton ultimately left Propaganda Films in 1994 to start his own media consultancy, Gayetonstudio, where he created interactive projects for dozens of clients. Most notable are: "Plug In", precursor to the first teen channel on AOL with Bart Decrem (1995); "Vanishing Point", first original content acquisition for MSN (1996); "Yahooligans", animated series for web and television for Yahoo and Fox (1996); "Plug in", first teen channel on AOL France (1997); "Zap!", first kids channel on AOL France (1997); "Very Small TV" and "Very Small City" (later renamed www.yafoule.com), online community for Vivendi (1999).

Gayeton provided creative support to Electronic Arts, Viacom, Sega, Intel, and National Geographic. An in-depth survey of Gayeton's interactive work is featured in The Interactive Writers Handbook by Jon Hamsel (ISBN 1885452039, 9781885452030).

With William Gibson, Gayeton wrote and directed the 1995 CD-ROM-based game Johnny Mnemonic, the first interactive CD-ROM-based movie, for Sony Imagesoft. He then wrote and designed a CD-ROM sequel to George Orwell's Nineteen Eighty-Four with Media-X and designed an interactive version of Einstein's Dreams with writer Alan Lightman.

From 1997 to 2000 Gayeton worked with Alphanim, a Paris-based animation company, where he developed a number of animated television series, the most notable being Delta State (TV series), a project based on his graphic novel of the same name. Purchased by Canal +, it received a Special Award for a TV series at the Annecy International Animated Film Festival and the Frames 2004 Award for best Asian Production. The fourth episode of his series Molotov Alva and His Search for the Creator was included in the Animation Show of Shows.

Following Gayeton's experience making Molotov Alva he joined MTV to work on their virtual world projects. This was followed by a brief stint as Chief Creative Officer of Millions of Us LLC, where he developed content for a variety of social network and virtual world platforms including Gaia, Habbo Hotel, Scenecaster, Zwinktopia and most recently Sony's PlayStation Home, the world's first high definition virtual world.

=== 2000s ===
In 2002 Gayeton was hired by Scripps Networks Interactive to explore new forms of "enhanced television", namely programming that allows viewers to migrate from television to the Internet and back again. The result was "Lost In Italy", a 26 episode interstitial series for the Fine Living Network.

In 2003 Gayeton was commissioned by PBS and POV to document Italy's Slow Food movement. He focused on the lives of people from the town of Pistoia, Italy. "PBS ultimately premiered "My Shoes are Caked with Mud" as part of "Borders", a web-based series. It was awarded a Webby for best broadband site of 2004.

In 2007 Gayeton created the first machinima documentary made in a virtual world: "Molotov Alva and His Search for the Creator: A Second Life Odyssey". The American broadcast rights were purchased by HBO Documentary Films in August, 2007, marking the first time a US television network purchased a series which premiered on YouTube. The groundbreaking film has been profiled in two books, The Making of Second Life: Notes from the New World by Wagner James Au and I, Avatar: The Culture and Consequences of Having a Second Life by Mark Stephen Meadows.

Slow Food Nation unveiled a retrospective of Gayeton's photographic work in 2008.

In 2009, Gayeton released his first book, Slow: Life in a Tuscan Town, which tells the story of the Slow Food Movement in Tuscany through a combination of photographs he took and essays. The intro to the book was written by chef Alice Waters and the preface, by the founder of the movement, Carlo Petrini.

In 2013, Gayeton directed a short film, called The Story of an Egg, which investigated the claims of "cage free," "free range" and "pasture raised" on eggs.

== Filmography ==
- La Entrada (1983)
- Suzanne Lacy and the Whisper Project (1985)
- Not my LA (1985)
- Tomorrow Project (1993)
- U2's Zoo TV (1995)
- WWW.MONDE.COM (1995)
- Ultimate Book of Spells (2001)
- Lost in Italy (2002–2005)
- Delta State (2004)
- Molotov Alva and His Search for the Creator: A Second Life Odyssey (2008)

=== Selected music videos ===
- "Freddie's Dead" by Fishbone (1987)
- "Three Mothers' by Minox (1991)
- "Limboland" by Minox (1991)
- "2000 B.C" by Basehead (1992)
- "Stormy" by Momma Stud (1993)
- "Stay This Way" by Brand New Heavies (1993)
- "Chains" by Collision (band) (1993)
- "Time Capsule" by Matthew Sweet (1994)
- "Down in Flames" by Semisonic (1995)

=== Other appearances in films ===
- "Seagull" – writer (2004)
- "Forever is a Long, Long Time" – actor (2004)
