= Millions of Us =

- Industry: Marketing agency
- Founded: 2006; 19 years ago
- Headquarters: San Francisco, California, United States
- Key people: Reuben Steiger; (CEO); Christian Lassonde; (President)
- Services: Establishing corporate presences in virtual worlds

Millions of Us LLC is an American specialty marketing agency, focused on virtual worlds and large online communities.

Founded in 2006 and based in San Francisco, the agency's clients include 20th Century Fox, Warner Bros., Toyota, Microsoft, and Intel. By late 2007, the company's executives were regularly quoted as authorities on virtual worlds and social media in business, technology, entertainment, and advertising publications.

Millions of Us is led by CEO Reuben Steiger and President Christian Lassonde, former Linden Lab executives. The firm initially established a reputation in 2006 as a market leader in developing campaigns and presences in Second Life for corporations such as Toyota and Microsoft. Beginning in June 2007, Millions of Us diversified into other virtual worlds such as Gaia Online and IAC/InterActiveCorp's Zwinktopia.

In October 2007, The Omnicom Group (NYSE: OMC), the world's largest advertising agency holding company in terms of revenue, took a minority stake in Millions of Us LLC.

== Other sources ==
- Steel, Emily (October 23, 2007). "Marketers explore new virtual worlds." The Wall Street Journal.
- Kluth, Andreas (October 18, 2007). "Social graph-iti." The Economist.
- Wagner, Mitch (September 21, 2007). "The Future of Virtual Worlds." InformationWeek.
- Inskeep, Steve (November 6, 2006). "Second Life: Real Money in a Virtual World." National Public Radio "Morning Edition."
- Nuttall, Chris (December 14, 2006). "Virtual mirror on the real world." Financial Times.
- Ward, David (November 26, 2007). "Five people leading the industry into the future." The Hollywood Reporter.
- Shields, Michael (December 10, 2007). "Industry to Zuckerberg: Apology (Mostly) Accepted." Adweek.
- Veiga, Alex (February 27, 2007). "Second Life an online first for many companies." Associated Press.
- Shah, Aarti (June 19, 2007). "Second Life used to promote Visual Studio's features." PRWeek
- Morrissey, Brian (October 11, 2007). "Omnicom Takes Stake in Second Life Shop." Adweek.
