= Fullscreen =

Fullscreen, full-screen, or full screen may refer to:

- Fullscreen (aspect ratio), an aspect ratio of 4:3—as opposed to widescreen (>1.37:1)
- Full-screen, in electronics and computing, an image/signal which covers the full display screen without the operating system's typical window-framing interface
- Fullscreen (company), an American entertainment company and multi-channel network
