= Dream TV (video game) =

1994 video game

- Cover art
- Developer: Bits Studios
- Publisher: Triffix
- Designers: Paul Hellier; Alex Martin
- Composer: David Whittaker
- Platform: Super NES
- Release: NA: April 1994
- Genre: Action
- Modes: Single-player, multiplayer

Dream TV is an action video game for the Super NES where the player has to guide two youngsters through a nightmarish land of evil television shows (using a similar plot to the campy movie Stay Tuned and Crystal Dynamics' video game Gex). The player has to escape by defeating stereotypical television villains and finding pieces of a puzzle. The game features complex labyrinths.

== Gameplay ==
National video gamers Charlie and Jimmy are given a strange-looking game cartridge game in the mail. When loading it in, the boys find themselves transported into the game. They are sucked in by an evil being known as the Critic. Now Jimmy and Charlie must fight for their lives through four Dream Worlds (Medieval, Egyptian, Prehistoric, and Future) if they hope to return home safely. Dream TV is an action-adventure puzzle video game with elements of ToeJam & Earl (1991), World of Illusion (1992), and The Lost Vikings (1993). It incorporates a split screen for both its single-player and two-player modes. Similar to The Lost Vikings, the game involves the player controlling two characters, one of which moves via the L and R buttons. Collecting nine hidden puzzle pieces from each level will take the guys to the final showdown with the Critic and hopefully back to reality.

== Development ==
GamePro first announced Dream TV in its October 1992, revealing its premise of kids getting sucked into a television and reporting a planned release of fall 1992.

== Reception ==
Reception

Review scores
| Publication | Score |
|---|---|
| AllGame | 1.5/5 |
| GameFan | 166/400 |
| Nintendo Power | 11.2/20 |
| Video Games (DE) | 49% |
| VideoGames & Computer Entertainment | 8/10 |

Reviews from Nintendo Power and VideoGames: The Ultimate Gaming Magazine praised its distinct utilization of the split-screen method, but felt it could've been better. Nintendo Power reported situations where two different areas of a level that looked the same time could confuse players, and that a player character could still get hit even if offscreen. The review also criticized the items' lack of clear purpose.

Other critics, although acknowledging the unique split-screen, were not as favorable and felt the experience was worsened by other factors. Critics found the character-switch mechanic aggravating to deal with, arguing it was easier to play the game in two-player mode. Brett Alan Weiss of AllGame noted other several issues, such as the awkward controls, bland items, "poorly drawn and unimaginative" graphics that look like they're from a Master System title, uninteresting-to-fight enemies, and "mind-numbingly repetitive" music. Critics from GameFan criticized its "ugly" and "tiny 8-bit" graphics, and "move to the left, move to the right action that goes nowhere", and the German magazine Video Games called out its "pathetic" sprite animations, music and scarce sound effects.
