= Art of Fighting 2 =

1994 video game

- Arcade flyer
- Developer: SNK
- Publishers: SNK; Super Famicom; Saurus
- Director: Akira Goto
- Producers: Eikichi Kawasaki; Hiroshi Matsumoto
- Programmer: John Guso
- Artists: Ayumi Tsuzaki; Higashi Pon; Kimura Ken
- Composers: Yasuhiro Naka; Yasumasa Yamada; Yoshihiko Kitamura
- Series: Art of Fighting
- Platforms: Arcade, Neo Geo AES, Neo Geo CD, Super Famicom
- Release: February 3, 1994: Arcade; WW: February 3, 1994 Neo Geo AES; WW: March 11, 1994 Neo Geo CD; JP: September 9, 1994; NA: October 1996 Super Famicom; JP: December 21, 1994
- Genre: Fighting
- Modes: Single-player, multiplayer
- Arcade system: Neo Geo MVS

Art of Fighting 2 (Note: Known in Japan as Dragon & Tiger Fist 2 (龍虎の拳 2, Ryūko no Ken 2)) is a 1994 fighting game developed and published by SNK for the Neo Geo arcade and home platforms. It is a direct sequel to 1992's Art of Fighting, involving both new and returning characters competing against each other in the King of Fighters tournament. The plot follows Ryo Sakazaki and his friends as they work together to take down the mafia host Geese Howard, whose forces manipulated them in the first Art of Fighting game. It retains most of the characters from the first game rather than just Ryo and Robert Garcia. The gameplay remains faithful to the original Art of Fighting, including Desperation Moves and taunts that are used strategically. This game was promoted with The King of Fighters '94 released in the same year by the company. It was ported to the Neo Geo AES, Neo Geo CD, and Super Famicom. It would be later re-released, along with the rest of the Art of Fighting trilogy, for more consoles.

The game was developed in a year by SNK. Unlike the first Art of Fighting, the game did not have a direct story, which led to more freedom in designing characters. The popularity of Fatal Fury: King of Fighters and its original video animation led to the inclusion of Geese Howard as final boss. Critical response to the game was mixed due to the high enemy AI and improved cast. It spawned the sequel Art of Fighting 3: The Path of the Warrior in 1996. The cast was also included in The King of Fighters.

== Gameplay ==
Gameplay screenshot showcasing a match between Yuri Sakazaki and King

The second installment in the Art of Fighting series added the "rage gauge"; similar to the "spirit system" of its predecessor, it limits the use and effectiveness of special attacks. This time the bonus stages are reworked: to increase the rage gauge, the player's character has to chop down a tree with one punch, to increase the maximum health meter, the player's character must defeat a number of punks under a certain time limit, and the Initiate Super Death Blow stage has now been adapted for each character's super special move.

== Plot ==
The game's story is set a year after the original in 1979. In the cliffhanger of Art of Fighting Yuri Sakazaki stops Ryo Sakazaki from attacking his masked father working for the mafia criminal Geese Howard. After knowing they were manipulated by Geese in the first game, the Sakazakis swear revenge against Geese. Geese Howard, a rising star in South Town's criminal underworld, summons all 12 fighters both veterans and newcomers to the city for a martial arts tournament, "The King of Fighters". The Sakazakis, Robert Garcia, among others join the tournament.

After defeating Mr. Big again, Ryo faces and defeats Geese in combat but the criminal manages to escape. Geese was the final boss and series original antagonist of SNK's other related fighting game franchise Fatal Fury, whose story took place two years after the events of Art of Fighting 2 where the late Jeff Bogard had been murdered by the hands of his former Hakkyokuseiken sparring partner Geese, which sparks the revenge of Jeff's adoptive sons Terry Bogard and Andy Bogard to fight in Geese's next King of Fighters tournament which takes place a decade later in 1991. The events of all three Art of Fighting sagas is canonically a prequel trilogy to the Fatal Fury series.

== Characters ==
Nearly every playable character from the first Art of Fighting, excluding Ryuhaku Todoh, returns in Art of Fighting 2, with Mr. Karate now goes by his true identity, Takuma Sakazaki. The game also adds three new characters, consisting of Yuri Sakazaki, Eiji Kisaragi, and Temjin, for a total of 12. While the previous game only allowed Ryo Sakazaki and Robert Garcia to be used in the single-player mode, Art of Fighting 2 expands the mode to accommodate all 12 characters. Additionally, Geese Howard from the Fatal Fury series appears as a secret boss if the player meets specific requirements in the single-player mode. Geese is not a playable character, however, with the exception of the Vs. mode in the SNES version.

- Yuri Sakazaki (ユリ・サカザキ, Yuri Sakazaki; sometimes written as 坂崎 ゆり, Sakazaki Yuri) is the younger sister of Ryo and daughter of Takuma. She is introduced in the first game as the hostage of Mr. Big, prompting Ryo and Robert to rescue her. She makes her playable debut in Art of Fighting 2, having been trained by Takuma in Kyokugenryu to defend herself, and teams up with her family to defeat Geese Howard.
- Eiji Kisaragi (如月 影二, Kisaragi Eiji) is a Japanese ninja from the feared and respected Kisaragi clan, whose techniques dates back from ancient history, through his ancestor Zantetsu, from The Last Blade series. His school is the sworn enemy of both the Sakazaki clan and Kyokugenryu Karate. Eiji is a mercenary, willing to kill for anyone so long as they pay well.
- Temjin (テムジン) is the only Mongolian dock worker at the South Town port. Temjin resigned himself to a period of menial work as a manure loader. Finding the job paid $25 an hour, Temjin stayed on, earning money for the small school in Mongolia where he dreams of teaching one day.
- Geese Howard, the main antagonist of Fatal Fury, Art of Fighting 2 depicted as his prequel appearance prior to Fatal Fury: King of Fighters. He is responsible for every events that first started in the first Art of Fighting.

== Production ==
SNK developer Yasuyuki Oda reflected that both Art of Fighting and Fatal Fury seemed to appeal to fans of male-oriented series like Fist of the North Star and Dragon Ball. The inclusion of portraying several macho fighters led to dilemma of including more female characters, with Mai Shiranui standing out as SNK's first female fighter. With Mai's high popularity in Fatal Fury, SNK decided to include Yuri in Art of Fighting 2 as a playable character, which received a similar response. Toyohisa Tanabe believed Capcom was ahead of their company when creating Dan Hibiki, a parody of Ryo, in Street Fighter Alpha. Since her introduction in Art of Fighting, Yuri was a weak character who becomes a fighter in a year, using her family's Kyokugen Karate style. Tanabe decided to make Yuri a strong character despite her background, and often borrowed techniques from Capcom fighting games out of respect and a fast fashion. Oda said a sideways movement technique like "Hien Shippukyaku" hit him, he would be taken right to the edge of the screen. Furthermore, if the distance between him and his opponent changed even a little, the screen would expand and contract, so he would get sickness without realizing it, and before he knew it, he was hitting the "yawn" button repeatedly.

Development of the game took a year. For the new characters, SNK was unable to connect them to the story, so they had more freedom in designing them. The company attempted to rival The King of Fighters by creating more appealing character designs like those of Kisaragai and Temjin. They wanted to rival King of Fighters in that way. Balancing them was the most difficult task. As the first game the staff were trying to pursue an interesting story, which necessarily meant more emphasis on the CPU battles. Art of Fighting 2 was meant to be more of a The King of Fighters-style, "fighting tournament" game. To that end, they intended for the vs. play to be more important this time. They used the names of the moves from the previous game as their basis. If there's a strong move, we try to come up with a fittingly tough-sounding name. Robert Garcia's lore was also updated by seeing him in the game too besides reading the manual book or manga. There were several links to the King of Fighters tournaments from Fatal Fury and The King of Fighters '94. Ryuhaku Todoh was also an early candidate for inclusion in Art of Fighting, but was later dropped for unknown reasons. Yuri's popularity led to the creation of unique characters related to her, but none of them made it to the actual game until her ending sequence. Geese Howard's popularity in Fatal Fury and his younger look from the first original video animation influenced his appearance in Art of Fighting 2 as a hidden boss.

== Reception ==
Reception

Review scores
| Publication | Score |
|---|---|
| Electronic Gaming Monthly | 8/10, 8/10, 6/10, 8/10 (NG) |
| IGN | 5/10 |
| Nintendo Life | 6/10 |
| Computer and Video Games | 95% |

The game was praised by both GamePro and Electronic Gaming Monthly for having far better graphics, sound, character selection and gameplay technique than the original Art of Fighting, though three of EGM's four reviewers complained that in single player mode the opponent AI is "incredibly cheap". GamePro gave it ratings (out of 5) of 5 for graphics, 5 for sound, 4.5 for controls, and 4.5 for fun factor. Computer and Video Games gave it a 95% score, calling it "easily the best beat-'em up to appear in recent years", comparing it favorably with recent Street Fighter II incarnations but criticizing its high £150-175 cost. Nintendo Life found the game superior to the first one due to its improved single player mode as well as system though he still had mixed feeling about the enjoyment the fighting system can give. Pocket Gamer found the fighting system too simplistic in comparison to other SNK works like KOF. Despite praising the improvements, Hardcore Gaming felt that the gameplay was too similar to its predecessor. The Super Nintendo port was panned as the "version is nothing short of a disaster, with horribly inaccurate visuals, atrocious controls, and slaughtered game physics" IGN agreed, finding the AI too challenging while the visuals instead feel like a stepdown, ruining SNK's attempts to improve the formula they established. ONE37pm listed it as the third best SNK game, citing the larger cast and gameplay as major improvements but criticizing the big difficulty. Game Informer noticed that while the fighting game series was overshadowed by Mortal Kombat II, Art of Fighting 2 should not be overlooked as it still possesses several attractive traits that made the first game attractive and SNK improved on it like the improved faster gameplay comparable to Samurai Shodown despite still not enjoying the SNK sequel. HardcoreGaming praised the game's improvements over the original despite similarities. Since the arcade mode comes across as too difficult, the website said that the game's strongest area is the Versus Mode.

The original trilogy were all released for the Neo Geo MVS arcade system, Neo Geo AES home console, and Neo Geo CD. Art of Fighting was ported to the PC Engine CD, SNES, and Sega Genesis/Mega Drive, while Art of Fighting 2 was also ported to the Super Famicom. Many of these ports made minor changes to the gameplay, story, or graphics. The Neo Geo trilogy was compiled in Art of Fighting Anthology (龍虎の拳 ～天・地・人～, Ryuuko no Ken Tenchijin) for the PlayStation 2, while the original game was also included as part of SNK Arcade Classics Vol. 1 and the NEOGEO Station service. The trilogy has also been digitally re-released via the Wii Virtual Console and the ACA Neo Geo series. Art of Fighting 2 was re-released for the Wii Virtual Console in North America on July 28, 2008. Hamster Corporation re-released the game as part of their ACA Neo Geo series for the PlayStation 4, Xbox One, Nintendo Switch, Windows, Android and iOS.
