= Art of Fighting 3: The Path of the Warrior =

1996 video game

- Arcade flyer
- Developer: SNK
- Publishers: SNK: Neo Geo CD; JP/EU: SNK; BRA: Neo Geo do Brasil Ltda.
- Director: Kimura Ken
- Producers: Hiroshi Matsumoto; Takashi Nishiyama
- Programmer: YuritaRo
- Artists: K. Miya; Hori Pu; Rolly-R
- Composers: Masahiko Hataya; Yasumasa Yamada
- Series: Art of Fighting
- Platforms: Arcade, Neo Geo AES, Neo Geo CD
- Release: Arcade: JP: March 12, 1996; NA: May 1996; Neo Geo AES: WW: April 26, 1996; Neo Geo CD: JP: June 14, 1996; EU: September 14, 1996
- Genre: Fighting
- Modes: Single-player, multiplayer
- Arcade system: Neo Geo MVS

Art of Fighting 3: The Path of the Warrior (Note: Known in Japan as ART OF FIGHTING: Ryūko no Ken Gaiden, (ART OF FIGHTING 龍虎の拳 外伝, Art of Fighting: Dragon & Tiger Fist Gaiden)) is a 1996 fighting game developed and published by SNK for the Neo Geo arcade and home platforms. It is the third installment in the Art of Fighting series, following 1994's Art of Fighting 2. It features a new cast of characters with the exception of Ryo Sakazaki and Robert Garcia. The game was ported to the Neo Geo AES and Neo Geo CD.

Like its predecessors, the game was produced by Hiroshi Matsumoto and Takashi Nishiyama. It is often noted as having some of the best sprite work SNK has produced, as the company worked for the first time in motion capture to give the game a more three-dimensional style. While the gameplay remains faithful, there is a big focus on juggle moves that cannot be defended, as well as Desperation Moves that can automatically defeat the enemy. The game was released to mixed reviews, with praise for its improved visuals and mechanics and criticism for its small cast and balance issues.

An updated re-release, The Path of the Warrior: Art of Fighting 3 R, which adds both King and Yuri Sakazaki is currently in development for Windows.

== Plot ==
The story switches focus from the Sakazakis to their other main character Robert Garcia. Robert disappears to search for an old childhood friend, Freia Lawrence, and he tracks her to Glasshill Valley, Mexico. Freia is wanted by the game's main antagonist, Tom Wyler, to complete a powerful elixir originally developed by their fathers. The drug affects users granting them supernatural strength. In Robert's case he is aware of this and wishes to save her and Wyler by himself, raising contention towards Ryo and others concerned for taking on this task alone. Meanwhile, other characters like Kasumi Todoh have different goals like defeating Ryo Sakazaki to avenge her missing father Ryuhaku.

== Gameplay ==
Gameplay screenshot showcasing a match between Kasumi Todoh and Rody Birts

The game is a fighting game like previous games but with changes and things remaining the games. The gameplay retains the "Desperation moves" from previous games, taunting, back dashing, dashing, and the ki meters. However, the ability to perform stronger punches and kicks by holding a button down has been removed. The game emulates 3D gameplay while remaining true to the 2D roots. Characters are given the ability move forward while attacking in order to create combo strategies. The combo system is similar to those from 3D fighters, and mostly consists of juggle combos that are executed by simply pushing a few consecutive attack buttons. There is a major emphasis on juggle combos despite how uncommon they are used in 2D games. Pushing kick or punch while holding the joystick in a specific direction will sometimes perform a different attack than if the joystick is in neutral. These attacks can decide the flow of the rounds and how to end them. Jump and attack your opponent are effective with enemies on the ground. Desperation moves performed on weak enemies on the first round result on an Ultimate Knock Out which automatically ends the battle.

== Characters ==
Ryo Sakazaki and Robert Garcia are the only returning characters in Art of Fighting 3, with all other playable characters being newcomers. The forthcoming 3 R release of the game will add two more returning characters, Yuri Sakazaki and King.

- Jin Fu-Ha (不破刃) is a former disciple of Eiji Kisaragi, who betrayed him. He then decides to kill Eiji, testing himself by first attempting to defeat Eiji's sworn enemy Ryo Sakazaki.
- Karman Cole (カーマン・コール) is a long-time employee of the Garcia family, acting in a personal assistant-like role to Robert since he was a child. The Garcias send Karman to find their son after he disappeared to look for his old childhood friend Freia Lawrence, which has led him to Glasshill Valley. Karman is a loyal employee who seems very fond of Robert Garcia and lets him get away with much more than he should.
- Kasumi Todoh (藤堂香澄, Tōdō Kasumi) is the daughter of Ryuhaku Todoh, who taught her the Todoh school of Aikido, Jujutsu and Kendo. As her family's sole heir, she does all she can to stand up for the Todoh way. When Ryuhaku left for South Town to settle an old score with Takuma Sakazaki, Kasumi remained waiting for her father's return. Months later, after learning Ryuhaku was defeated by Takuma's son Ryo, she decides to find and challenge him to avenge her father's defeat.
- Lenny Creston (レニィ・クレストン) is a private investigator who works with Rody Birts. She is a tough, straight-talking woman who wields a whip, but with a caring nature underneath. Though there seems to be some romantic tension between them, she and Rody are partners in a business sense only. They have been hired by Wyler to find and deliver Freia Lawrence to him. The two appear to have a bad reputation within their profession and Lenny sees their new assignment as their 'big chance'.
- Rody Birts (ロディ・バーツ) is a private investigator who works with Lenny Creston. Though she dominates him, their relationship is good-natured and there is even a hint of romantic tension. The two appear to have a bad reputation as private eyes. He goes to Glasshill Valley to search for Freia Lawrence on orders from Wyler.
- Wang Koh-San (Chinese: 王覚山) is an artist entering a competition, and is also a friend of Lee Pai Long. He comes to Glasshill Valley for inspiration for the competition, but once there he learns of Wyler's Elixir and thinks that it will interest Lee. Wang travels with his pet pelican Hoeh-Hoeh.
- Sinclair (シンクレア) is Wyler's bodyguard. Though she pretends to encourage him in his experiments, she secretly wants him to stop them. She has a flashy sword fighting style reminiscent of Indian swordsmanship.
- Tom Wyler (トム・ワイラー) is the final boss in Art of Fighting 3. He works on perfecting a powerful elixir that was originally developed by his father and Freia Lawrence's father. However, when their partnership fell part, Freia's father took the essential data needed to complete the elixir and left it with Freia. Wyler blames this action for his father becoming destitute and eventually dying, and begins seeking Freia so he can complete the elixir.

== Development and release ==
Like the first Art of Fighting and the sequel Art of Fighting 2, the third installment was produced by Hiroshi Matsumoto or Takashi Nishiyama. It was the first game in the series (and the first SNK fighting game) to use motion capture for its animation, The concept behind Art of Fighting 3 was to use motion capture, so instead of the company's own Artbox tool that had been used to develop MVS and Neo Geo games, SNK used Microsoft Windows. At the time, SNK did not have the technology for motion capture, so motion capture was recorded in the United States over a period of one to two months. After that, each character's movements were pixelated based on the motion capture. In an interview with Famitsu, designer Nobuyuki Kuroki, who was involved in the development of the series, said that while the captured data lost its original form as it was refined, he was still able to achieve smooth pixel art. The material was originally going to be used in the Fatal Fury installment Garou: Mark of the Wolves, but was left unfinished; eventually, SNK restarted development of that game as Fatal Fury: City of the Wolves. This led to several difficulties and SNK using few characters in general.

In the development environment at the time, each person in charge would create the images and sounds using specialized development equipment, and the programmer would use those materials to create the game, but during development, they would actually burn the data onto ROMs, and then fit them one by one onto the board to check the results of the development. I think Windows was introduced with Art of Fighting 3. Some of the data was created for Metal Slug which the staff liked. The staff was young during development of the game and had to live together in the making of it. The basic approach was to divide the work. About a month before the master-up date when the game is completed, there is a deadline for the character data, called "character mask," and that is when the designers are "done." After that, they go home at the regular time. But everyone else still has a lot of work left to do... It was quite a sight to see.

For Art of Fighting 3, Ryo was modified to feel more realistic to play. In retrospect, they felt that the only way to know Ryo's story was playing Art of Fighting as SNK kept developing KOF among other products where Ryo was playable but was not explored. In regards to the third Art of Figthting, the game was noted to be called "Gaiden" (lit. "alternative story") as a result of the story focusing now on Robert rather than Ryo. Art of Fighting 3 was ported to Neo Geo CD with the action with visual issues as a result of the sprites could not fit in the system's RAM. It also suffered long loading times in comparison to the original. The original trilogy were all released for the Neo Geo MVS arcade system, Neo Geo AES home console. The Neo Geo trilogy was compiled in Art of Fighting Anthology (龍虎の拳 ～天・地・人～, Ryuuko no Ken Tenchijin) for the PlayStation 2, while the original game was also included as part of SNK Arcade Classics Vol. 1 and the NEOGEO Station service. The trilogy has also been digitally re-released via the Wii Virtual Console and the ACA Neo Geo series.

At the 2026 Evolution Championship Series tournament, 30 years after the game's original release, SNK and Code Mystics announced The Path of the Warrior: Art of Fighting 3 R as part of their Neo Geo Premium Selection series of updated re-releases for PC. In addition to rebalancing the existing roster, 3 R will feature two additional characters from previous games, as well as a new training mode and support for local or online multiplayer with rollback netcode.

== Reception and legacy ==
Reception

Review scores
Publication	Score
Electronic Gaming Monthly	5/10
Next Generation	3/5
Nintendo Life	7/10

According to Famitsu, the Neo Geo CD version sold over 20,877 copies in its first week on the market. The four reviewers of Electronic Gaming Monthly gave the Neo Geo AES version a 5 out of 10. They lambasted the game for its poor balance, with their biggest complaint being the new Ultra-Cool Attacks, since they are easy to execute, cannot be blocked, and deal a massive amount of damage. They further criticized the game's lack originality and innovation, and said that it failed to distinguish itself from the deluge of 2D fighting games of the time. A reviewer for Next Generation saw no problem with the game's balance, but concurred that it is "too similar to every other 2D fighting game on the market". He gave the Neo Geo AES version three out of five stars. In retrospect, HardcoreGaming101 noted that the game "is a drastic step away from its predecessors", comparing Robert's story to "a Jekyll and Hyde". They compared the gameplay to Virtua Fighter and Tekken, despite the usage of 2D graphics and reliance on a 3D style. Nintendo Life scored it a 7 out of 10, praising the simplistic and faithful fighting system but criticizing the 3D design changes. There were mixed responses to the story mode for the lack of cutscenes and large amount of dialogue for each character. In comparing previous games, the fighting system felt improved over previous Art of Fighting games and the polishing of new character sprites. The fact that the player can still zoom in and out when getting closer to the enemies was still praised by the reviewer. In conclusion, they found it to be an appealing game despite not being up to the level of The King of Fighters '98 and Garou: Mark of the Wolves.

IGN and Eurogamer instead felt that Art of Fighting 3 was a massive improvement over the series, with the latter praising the visuals used for character sprites and victory scenes. They found that the new touches of the gameplay added replay value, highlighting how the Desperation Moves become more strategic if the player wants to win their first round. IGN believed the game to be the most modern fighting game in the Art of Fighting series, mainly due to the graphical improvements and how advanced they were for the Neo Geo system. GameSpot found it "very different from conventional fighting games" and "unfinished", but said it still feels more unique than the previous two games. They compared the fighting system to Tekken, highlighting the attacks that cannot be defended. In regards to the unfinished comment, the issue the reviewer found was that only Ryo and Robert have proper endings, while the rest playable characters seem to lack dialogue.

Kasumi Todoh would appear in The King of Fighters series starting in The King of Fighters '96. Game designer Toyohisa Tanabe wanted to work on a new Art of Fighting installment using the engine of recently created The King of Fighters '96 engine but was not given permission by his superior. By 1997, when The King of Fighters achieved high popularity with the Orochi story arc in The King of Fighters '97, writer Akihiko Ureshino recalls fans believing Ryo and Yuri being original KOF character. However, Ryo Sakazaki and Yuri Sakazaki are genuine characters of the Art of Fighting series, and are not the "comedians" of the KOF series. They tend to be unable to get involved in the main story and end up in comical roles, but Ryo and the others are actually more serious characters. For this reason, Ureshino thinks there are many fans who do not want to accept Ryo and the others in KOF.

In retrospect, Thrilling Tales of Old Video Games noted Art of Fighting 3 was nicknamed Gaiden in Japan to further clarify this installment was focused on Robert rather than Ryo. This led to analysis of why Robert's story takes place in Mexico as he considered his last name Garcia as an indication that he is Mexican though SNK's developers claimed he is actually Italian descendant. This often confused people because he represents Mexico in The King of Fighters '94. Though Robert is the protagonist in a story set in Mexico, it is suggested he at least grew in such country with a friend of him having a Mexican sounding name, Friea Lawrence.
