= Art of Fighting (video game) =

1992 video game

- North American arcade flyer
- Developer: SNK (Note: Genesis/Mega Drive version developed by Sega; CD-ROM² version developed by Alfa System.)
- Publishers: SNK: SNES; JP: K.Amusement Leasing Co.; NA/EU: Takara Genesis/Mega Drive Sega CD-ROM² Hudson Soft
- Director: Hiroshi Matsumoto
- Producer: Eikichi Kawasaki
- Designers: Ahokamen Boke; Teizo Muta; Tony Oki
- Programmer: John Guso
- Composers: Masahiko Hataya; Toshio Shimizu; Yasumasa Yamada
- Series: Art of Fighting
- Platforms: Arcade, Neo Geo AES, Super NES, Genesis/Mega Drive, PC Engine CD-ROM², Neo Geo CD
- Release: September 24, 1992: Arcade; WW: September 24, 1992 Neo Geo AES; WW: December 11, 1992 Super NES; JP: October 29, 1993; NA: December 1993; EU: December 1, 1993 Genesis/Mega Drive; JP: January 14, 1994; NA: September 1994; EU: 1994 CD-ROM²; JP: March 26, 1994 Neo Geo CD; JP: September 9, 1994; NA: October 1996
- Genre: Fighting
- Modes: Single-player, multiplayer
- Arcade system: Neo Geo MVS

Art of Fighting (Note: Known in Japan as Dragon & Tiger Fist (龍虎の拳, Ryūko no Ken)) is a 1992 fighting game developed and published by SNK for the Neo Geo arcade and home platforms. It is the first game in the Art of Fighting series. It was eventually ported to the Neo Geo AES, Neo Geo CD, PC Engine CD-ROM², Sega Genesis, and Super Nintendo Entertainment System. The game follows Kyokugenryu Karate users Ryo Sakazaki and Robert Garcia as they travel to fight criminals from South Town in order to find Ryo's missing sister Yuri. The game employs special moves and stronger Desperation Moves that can be performed strategically by filling the player's energy bar and removing enemies by taunting them.

The game originated from Hiroshi Matsumoto’s desire to create a fighting game with a strong emphasis on storytelling. During development, SNK’s team found the gameplay particularly challenging, as the game introduced new mechanics such as the Desperation Move and placed notable emphasis on visible graphical damage.

It went on to become one of SNK’s major successes of the early 1990s, praised for its innovative fighting engine and narrative focus. Art of Fighting introduced several features that later became staples of the genre, including the super gauge, super moves, taunts, dashes, and dynamic screen scaling. This eventually led to connect it to other SNK franchises to in the form of crossovers with the Fatal Fury series among others which would form as the basis of The King of Fighters series from SNK. Despite its commercial success, critical response to the gameplay was negative, as many considered the game inferior to previously released games like Street Fighter II, also resulting in criticism from their similarities; nevertheless, the visuals were praised.

== Plot ==
In 1978, the martial artist "Invincible Dragon" Ryo Sakazaki and his best friend Robert Garcia set out in search of Ryo's sister Yuri, who is being held hostage by the mob boss Mr. Big in South Town. After fighting several enemies with their Kyokugen Karate ("Extreme-style Karate") martial arts, Ryo and Robert defeat Mr. Big, who leads them to Yuri, who, in turn, is being held in captivity by an unknown assassin in a tengu mask. The assassin is defeated, but Yuri interrupts Ryo before he can finish him off; the story ends in a cliffhanger with Yuri about to reveal the masked man's identity.

== Characters ==
In Art of Fighting, only Ryo and Robert are playable in the single-player mode; all others can only be used in the game's Vs. mode.

- Ryo Sakazaki (リョウ・サカザキ, Ryō Sakazaki; sometimes written as 坂崎 亮, Sakazaki Ryō) is a skilled martial artist and one of the top disciples of his family's fighting style, Kyokugenryu Karate, alongside his sister Yuri and Robert Garcia. Ryo sets out to rescue his sister Yuri after she is abducted by Mr. Big.
- Robert Garcia (ロバート・ガルシア, Robāto Garushia) is Ryo's best friend and fellow Kyokugenryu student. He is the son of a billionaire family from Italy, sent to train in Ryo's dojo as a favor to Robert's father; he eventually helps Ryo rescue Yuri from Mr. Big's captivity.
- Ryuhaku Todoh (藤堂竜白, Tōdō Ryūhaku) is the first opponent in the arcade mode of Art of Fighting. He is the creator and main teacher of the Todoh fighting style, which derives from Jujutsu, Kendo and Kobujutsu. Todoh has a long-standing rivalry with disciples of the Kyokugenryu school of karate and considers them a threat to his dojo in terms of profits; and also there is a long-standing personal animosity dating back to a rivalry with the Kyokugenryu karate master Takuma Sakazaki which began when both men were very young. Todoh is the only character from Art of Fighting to not return in Art of Fighting 2. Voiced by: Takayuki Sakai (AOF), Takeshi Aono (AOF anime, CVS2) (Japanese); James Carter Cathcart (AOF anime) (English)
- Jack Turner (ジャック・ターナー, Jaku Tānā) is a member of Mr. Big's syndicate, and a developer of his own fighting style. One of Mr. Big's highest-ranking subordinates, he devastates anyone who crosses his path. Jack is also the leader of the South Town gang known as the Neo Black Cats. Voiced by: Ginzō Matsuo (AOF anime) (Japanese); Eric Stuart (AOF anime) (English)
- Lee Pai Long (Chinese: 李白龍) is a master of Chinese martial arts from Taiwan and an expert of his country's medicine. His adoptive father and mentor, Lee Gakusuo, passed on his pharmaceutic knowledge and martial arts to him before instructing Lee to finish his studies in South Town. Once he arrived there, Lee became fascinated with the local style of Kenpo and neglected his roots to be a street fighter. He works as the director of the South Town prison, but also has a small herbal shop which he runs part-time. A former adversary and long-time friend of Ryo Sakazaki's father Takuma, he enters the tournament to test Ryo's skills. And like his friend, he dons a mask; in this case, a Monkey Mask. Voiced by: Eiji Yano (AOF), Kazuhiro Inage (AOF2)
- King (キング, Kingu) is a female Muay Thai fighter from France who dresses as a man in order to present herself as a reliable fighter, hide her true identity, and for various other reasons such as the fact that she has been at war with her own sex for years. Originally, her true gender was meant to be a surprise for the player, revealed only if she was defeated with a special move; as time went by, however, her design became more feminine, albeit without straying too far from the original concept. In the first Art of Fighting, King is hired by the criminal Mr. Big to work as a bouncer in his tournament. After King is defeated by Ryo Sakazaki and Robert Garcia who were searching for Ryo's kidnapped sister, Yuri, King agrees to help them to find Mr. Big. In Art of Fighting 2, King enters into the first of the King of Fighters tournament in order to win the prize money to pay for an operation for her younger brother, Jan, to regain the use of his legs. As such, Ryo and Robert decide to use the prize money to pay for the operation in gratitude for helping them to find Yuri.

Voiced by: Harumi Ikoma (games, KOF: D), Masako Katsuki (AOF anime), Yumi Tōma (KOF '94 Drama CD) (Japanese); Sharon Becker (AOF anime) (English)

- Mickey Rogers (ミッキー・ロジャース, Mikkī Rojāsu) is a former professional boxer who was expelled from the ranks after he accidentally killed a man in the ring. He currently stalks South Town seeking opponents to vent his anger and frustration on, and enters the tournament for the same reason. Like Crawley, Mickey gets a haircut between his two appearances. In Art of Fighting, Mickey becomes a small-time hood who works for Mr. Big so that he can get money as a street hustler.

Voiced by: Kazuhiro Inage (AOF–AOF2)

- John Crawley (ジョン・クローリー, Jon Kurōrī) is a martial arts instructor, and with his brutal and aggressive fighting style was known to his friends as "The Madman" and "The Killing Machine". He enters the tournament to win the prize money and test his skills. In the first AOF, Crawley has longer hair. By the time AOF2 occurs, his hair is cut shorter. In John's AOF2 ending, the US Military attempts to recruit him to rescue the President's canary, but John refuses.

Voiced by: Masaki Usui (AOF–AOF2), Kaneto Shiozawa (AOF anime) (Japanese); Eric Stuart (AOF anime) (English)

- Mr. Big (Mr.ビッグ, Misutā Biggu) is the sub-boss. Mr. Big is a former Special Forces military member, and a long-time mob boss who ordered Yuri's kidnapping for reasons unknown.
- The final boss, named in-game as "?", is Yuri's kidnapper, an assassin in a tengu mask hired by Mr. Big. He has a fighting style similar to Ryo's. In the opening of Art of Fighting 2, he is revealed to be Ryo and Yuri's father Takuma Sakazaki (タクマ・サカザキ, Takuma Sakazaki) (also written as Sakazaki Takuma (坂崎 拓馬)), who was threatened by Mr. Big into holding Yuri hostage.

== Gameplay ==
Gameplay screenshot showcasing a match between Ryo Sakazaki and Ryuhaku Todoh

The Art of Fighting series follows the conventions of the time in the sense that the player faces a variety of opponents in best two-out-of-three matches. Each of the game's characters have a unique fighting style and set of special techniques. Ryo Sakazaki and Robert Garcia are the only playable heroes in the single player story mode, although eight of the game's ten fighters are playable by default in the two player versus mode. Mr. Big and Mr. Karate can be played in the Neo Geo MVS (arcade) version by reaching their respective stages in the game then having a second player join in, and in the Neo Geo AES (console) version through the use of cheat codes.

The player has two basic attacks—punch and kick—as well as a utility button that switches between punches, kicks, and throws. A fourth button is used for taunting. Art of Fighting's contribution to the genre was the inclusion of a "spirit gauge" underneath the character's life bar. When characters perform special techniques, their spirit gauge is depleted and their special attacks become weaker. Players can also drain their opponent's spirit gauge by taunting them.

The Art of Fighting series was also the first fighting series to allow players to perform a "super attack". In the original Art of Fighting, the player's character can learn a super attack (dubbed the super death blow) by completing one of the game's bonus rounds (this technique is available by default in the 3rd game). All three games also feature "Desperation Attacks" that can only be performed when the player's health is low and the life bar is flashing. The series also introduced graphical scaling into the fighting game genre: as the characters move towards each other, the camera zooms in to maximize the level of detail. Character sprites in Art of Fighting change as the fight progresses to become more bruised and cut as damage is taken.

== Development ==
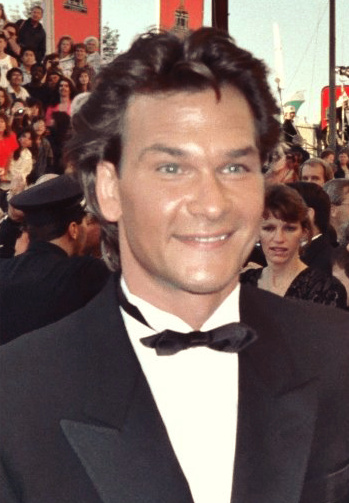
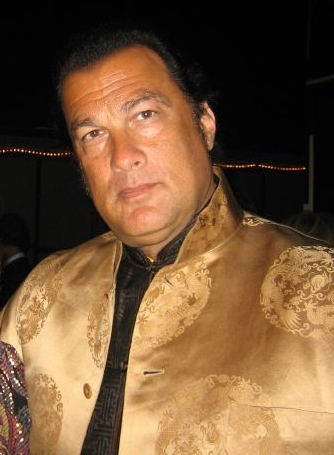
The main cast includes several models such as Patrick Swayze (left) for Ryo and Steven Seagal for Robert.

Shortly after the release of Street Fighter, a headhunter approached director Takashi Nishiyama and convinced him to leave Capcom and join nearby studio SNK. Nishiyama took planner Hiroshi Matsumoto and the majority of his team with him and abandoned the Street Fighter IP. In SNK, Matsumoto directed the fighting game Art of Fighting starring the leads Ryo Sakazaki and Robert Garcia who fight people in the city of South Town to rescue the missing Yuri Sakazaki. The cast were created by Matsumoto as an homage to the Capcom fighting games' characters. Whereas Ryo was modeled after American actor Patrick Swayze, Robert Garcia was based on the actors Steven Seagal and Andy Garcia, until his redesign in The King of Fighters XIV which used the image of Orlando Bloom. Matsumoto has stated that he felt he was appealing to people who did not usually play games by showing the story in the game instead of just media such as magazines and comics.

SNK staffer Youichiro Soeda called Ryo and Robert's debut unique compared to other SNK games, because the story was not centered on a fighting tournament, but on the duo's personal quest to rescue Yuri Sakazaki. The decision to zoom in as the characters got closer to each other was partially a marketing ploy to show off the detailed sprite work. In early development, the zoom-in was so extreme that characters were only visible from the knees up at the closest. Taunts and Desperation Moves were added to make the fighting system more strategic and show body damage to characters on-screen, respectively. Since the game primarily mainly men, the staff had problems deciding on a female fighter. This eventually resulted in the creation of King created to be strong as modeled after was the actress Grace Jones famous for the character May Day in the James Bond film A View to a Kill (1985). However, the final design was more andrdogynous almost llike a man. Meanwhile, the other female character, Yuri, was given a more fragile portrayal despite having the same voice as King. In charge of the art was Shinkiro, who has said he had no problems with designing Ryo because he himself had not been rich. Designing Robert Garcia, who was rich, caused him "trouble". Nobuyuki Kuroki said Art of Fighting was "action game at heart", fitting for a reboot that could emphasize more of its unique aspects, dreaming of creating such installment. He regarded Ryo as his favorite Art of Fighting character as he always used to play as him in the first game as a child. He considered his story unique by that time.

The original trilogy were all released for the Neo Geo MVS arcade system, Neo Geo AES home console, and Neo Geo CD. Art of Fighting was ported to the PC Engine CD, SNES, and Sega Genesis/Mega Drive, while Art of Fighting 2 was also ported to Super Famicom. Many of these ports made minor changes to the gameplay, story, or graphics.

The Neo Geo trilogy was compiled in Art of Fighting Anthology (龍虎の拳 ～天・地・人～, Ryuuko no Ken Tenchijin) for the PlayStation 2, while the original game was also included as part of SNK Arcade Classics Vol. 1 and the NEOGEO Station service. The trilogy has also been digitally re-released via the Wii Virtual Console and the ACA Neo Geo series.

== Reception ==
Reception

Review scores
Publication	Score
GameSpot	4/10
IGN	4.5/10
Nintendo Life	4/10 (Switch)

In the United States, the RePlay arcade charts listed Art of Fighting as the top-grossing software conversion kit of December 1992. Critical response to the game has been negative when it came to the gameplay and positive to the visuals. Nintendo Life was negative to the game, considering it a poor game from SNK that could not compete with similar games like Street Fighter II, citing few playable characters, limited gameplay and a strong enemy AI despite still praising the graphics. GameSpot agreed, citing the visuals as one of the best on the Neo Geo, but pointed out that the "underlying gameplay is nearly devoid of soul." GameSpot specifically said this was due to the requirements needed to perform special moves, and called the game a Street Fighter "knock off". IGN was also negative, claiming the game lacked more innovations than just King's gender, and criticized the gameplay for being too simple. They cited that the previously released Fatal Fury: King of Fighters had the same negative problems involving only three playable characters, but lacks the innovation that Fatal Fury had, as two players could tag the enemy AI together that game, in contrast to Ryo and Robert, who fight alone. Nevertheless, like other reviewers, IGN cited the visuals as one of its few redeeming qualities.

A number of critics compared Ryo and Robert to Street Fighter protagonists Ryu and Ken Masters due to their physical appearance and techniques; however, their morales and bond were praised. Greg Kasavin of GameSpot regarded "Haohshokohken" move as one of the most influential fireball moves in fighting game history due to how strong Ryo's fire technique is, and how it would be notable in Capcom's later games like Marvel vs. Capcom.

== Legacy ==
Art of Fighting introduced many concepts that have since become fighting game staples, including super gauge, super moves, taunts, dashes and screen scaling. The sequel, Art of Fighting 2, incorporated Geese Howard due to his popularity in Fatal Fury and his younger look from the first original video animation as a hidden boss. Yasuyuki Oda reflected that both Art of Fighting and the other IP, Fatal Fury, seemed to appeal to fans of male-oriented series like Fist of the North Star and Dragon Ball. The inclusion of several macho fighters led to the dilemma of including more female characters, with Mai Shiranui standing out as SNK's first female fighter. With Mai's high popularity in Fatal Fury, SNK decided to include Yuri in Art of Fighting 2 as a playable character, which received a similar response. The scene of Ryo Sakazaki in the first Art of Fighting game where he is riding a motorbike in his fighting gi became an internet meme. Merchandise such as clothing based on it was developed. SNK artist Falcoon was caught on it by surprise when a friend showed him wearing a shirt featuring a meme. Bringing Ryo to Fatal Fury Special was considered a good idea by Yasuyuki Oda, who believed he fits the cast and how it revolutionized the idea of the crossover concept that would conceptualize The King of Fighters. However, keeping the inclusion under wraps proved problematic for SNK. Although the developers planned to keep the character's appearance a secret until the game's release, Ryo was announced on a huge screen at the Tokyo Game Show.

The character of Dan Hibiki from the Street Fighter series is deemed to be a parody of Ryo's similarities with Ryu and Ken, but his design is more like Robert's while he is showing mannerisms like those of Yuri Sakazaki. In humorous retaliation, Street Fighter II co-designer Akiman drew artwork of Street Fighter's Sagat holding a defeated opponent by the head during the release of Street Fighter II: Champion Edition. The defeated opponent wore an attire similar to Ryo's: an orange karate gi with a torn black shirt underneath and geta sandals like Ryo; but had long dark hair tied to a ponytail like Robert. These similarities are addressed in the crossover game SNK vs. Capcom: SVC Chaos, with GameSpot's Greg Kasavin stating that fans would appreciate the appearances and the interactions between Ryo, Dan, and Takuma. A X68000 version of Art of Fighting was in development by Magical Company, but went unreleased for unknown reasons.

Hamster Corporation re-released the game as part of their ACA Neo Geo series for the PlayStation 4, Xbox One, Nintendo Switch, Windows, Android and iOS.
