= King (SNK) =

- Art of Fighting and The King of Fighters character
- King as illustrated in The King of Fighters XIII by Eisuke Ogura
- First game: Art of Fighting (1992)
- Voiced by: English: Sharon Becker (AOF anime); Japanese: Harumi Ikoma (games, KOF: Destiny); Masako Katsuki (AOF anime); Yumi Tōma (KOF '94 drama CD)

In-universe information
- Fighting style: Muay Thai kickboxing
- Origin: France

King (Japanese: キング, Hepburn: Kingu) is a character from the Art of Fighting fighting game series introduced in 1992. King is a bartender from South Town whom the protagonists Ryo Sakazaki and Robert Garcia face when in search of Yuri Sakazaki. King eventually helps them, and her character is expanded in the sequel Art of Fighting 2, where she is driven by the desire to heal her ill brother Jan. King is also famous for being the leader of the Women Fighters Team from The King of Fighters series, ever since its debut in 1994's game The King of Fighters '94. While she maintains good relationships with fellow teammates Yuri and Mai Shiranui, she often joins the Art of Fighting Team, composed of her members from her original series. Additionally, King has appeared in crossovers that SNK has developed alongside Capcom and adaptations of Art of Fighting and The King of Fighters.

The character of King was created by SNK under the idea of disguising a female fighter among several male fighters from Art of Fighting. Inspired by Grace Jones, King's design has changed from a manly woman to a more feminine individual in later products. This is more notable in The King of Fighters, where she was mainly included as a sign of SNK being more aware of promoting more female characters in their IPs. Critical response to King was initially ambiguous due to her desire to hide her gender in Art of Fighting, leaving multiple interpretations about her identity, but was still praised for development across The King of Fighters due to becoming a recurring character and developing an appealing Muay Thai move.

== Conception and design ==
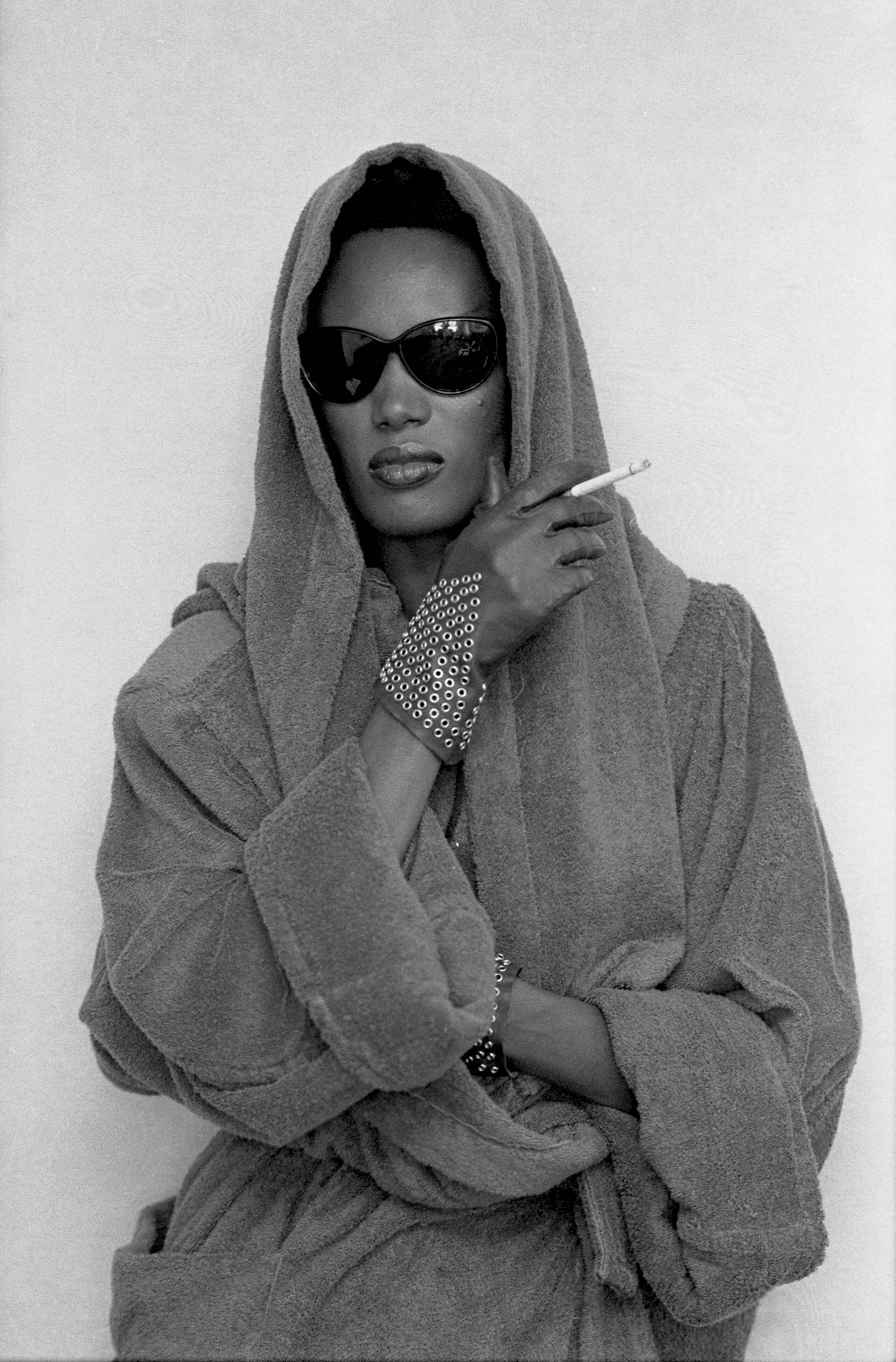
King was modelled after Grace Jones.

Since the fighting game Art of Fighting primarily relied on men, the SNK staff had problems deciding on a female fighter. This eventually resulted in the creation of King created to be strong as modeled after the actress Grace Jones, famous for the character May Day in the James Bond film A View to a Kill (1985). However, the final design was almost like a man. For her return in Art of Fighting 2, King's design was meant to be feminine featuring skimpy clothing that exposes her and wearing a sleeveless jacket. However, it was scrapped in favor of the final product.

Debuting in Art of Fighting as the only playable female character, King has since become a mainstay of The King of Fighters series, first appearing on the Women Fighters team in The King of Fighters '94, originally labeled as the England Team. King is French, though, and fights with a form of Muay Thai kickboxing, along with powerful special moves such as her projectile move Venom Strike (ヴェノムストライク). Despite being the first female fighter in Art of Fighting, her initial appearance was designed so that her gender was not clear. This includes her clothes, which are manly, while the earrings were made feminine. King was voiced by Harumi Ikoma. She stands 175 centimetres (5 ft 9 in) tall and has measurements of 86-57-86 cm (34-22-34 in).

Starting with The King of Fighters '94, the English Team was composed of King from Art of Fighting, along with Billy Kane and Big Bear from the first and second Fatal Fury games. Designers had several problems with Big Bear concerning capacity and the Art of Fighting staff insisted on adding Yuri Sakazaki to KOF. Yuri replaced Billy Kane, and later Mai Shiranui took Big Bear's place to form the England Team (later known as Women Fighters in the following games). Battle designer Toyohisa Tanabe was the one who came with the idea of King's team after learning of Art of Fighting 2's development as he was surprised that fellow character Yuri became a fighter in the sequel. Though the teams were originally named after countries, planners noted some characters did not fit the team with King being French despite belonging to the England Team. The Special Move "Surprise Rose" (サプライズローズ) was initially scheduled to be scrapped when KOF started as the development staff was worried about coming up with a move that was something different. However, King's designer "whipped" it, which was well received and stayed in the series.

Artist Shinkiro's illustrations for the Women Fighters team show King in her Art of Fighting 2 design instead of other games. Her The King of Fighters '98 sketches were altered to King's look from past games. The artist pointed her jacket only has one pocket and that the heels of her shoes are not to be made too high. For The King of Fighters XIII, King was modeled after her Art of Fighting incarnation rather than The King of Fighters one. While she wears tuxedo she wore in the KOF series, her costume is more in keeping with the Art of Fighting series. They added a new move, the "Airborne Venom Strike." It is a projectile fired from a high position, making it difficult to avoid by jumping, and the move itself leaves little room for error. Her "Surprise Rose" was based on The King of Fighters 2002: Unlimited Match, which becomes more crucial for her design. Her Neomax, the "Venom Shot" (ベノムショット), is a stronger version of the Venom Strike meant to be at the same level of the Kyokugen technique "Haoh Shokou Ken" originally used by the leads from Art of Fighting and thus was given proper attention to its visuals. Battle director Yuji Watanabe wanted to give King new special moves for this installment The King of Fighters XIV but the idea was scrapped in favor of retaining her original version.

== Appearances ==
King is a female Muay Thai fighter from France who dresses as a man in order to present herself as a reliable fighter, hide her true identity. In her debut game, Art of Fighting, King is hired by the criminal Mr. Big to work as a bouncer in his tournament. After King is defeated by the protagonists Ryo Sakazaki and Robert Garcia who were searching for Ryo's kidnapped sister, Yuri, King agrees to help them to find Mr. Big. In the sequel Art of Fighting 2, King enters into the first of the King of Fighters tournament in order to win the prize money to pay for an operation for her younger brother, Jan, to regain the use of his legs. In her ending, Ryo and Robert decide to use the prize money to pay for the operation in gratitude for helping them to find Yuri. While King is absent from the initial release of Art of Fighting 3, she is set to appear in its forthcoming update, Art of Fighting 3 R. In the Japanese animated television film Art of Fighting, King reprises her role from the first game, antagonizing Ryo and Robert as she works alongside Mr. Big. Since Art of Fighting takes place in the same universe as SNK's IP Fatal Fury, writer Akihiko Ureshino suggested that while King and Ryo might become love interests, the two might not become a couple due to the latter's obsession with training as Ryo often appears in Fatal Fury installments and other works as an older fighter with King herself making a cameo in Fatal Fury: City of the Wolves.

She is commonly playable in The King of Fighters as part of the Women Fighters debuting with Yuri and Mai Shiranui. She often switches with the Art of Fighting Team participating in new competitions. Across the series, King and Ryo are attracted to each other, resulting in gags where their teammates try to make them closer. Due to the character's constant development in regards to new special techniques the installment The King of Fighters '98 Ultimate Match, gave King an alternate persona based on her Art of Fighting incarnations.

She also appears in spin-offs like The King of Fighters: Kyo as a recruitable fighter, Neowave, and the mobile game The King of Fighters All Star. The Chinese adaptation The King of Fighters: Destiny also has King participating in a tournament while an episode retells her first encounter with Ryo in Art of Fighting. In Andy Seto's manhua The King of Fighters Zillion, Jan is kidnapped by the terrorist organization NESTS leading to King to help them by taking Kyo and Yuki in exchange of him. Jan becomes the vessel of the ancient demon Orochi but Kyo rescues him after defeating the demon. King is also playable in the crossover fighting games Capcom vs. SNK: Millennium Fight 2000 and Capcom vs. SNK 2. She is also present in the Days of Memories love simulator.

== Reception ==
In "Bye, Bye, Birdo: Heroic Androgyny and Villainous Gender-Variance in Video Games", King is noted to be first introduced as a notorious masculine fighter and becomes more feminine in her following appearance while still keeping androgynous touches. In a retrospective article of Art of Fighting, Futaman Fubanet said that defeating King with a special move led to a major surprise as most players believed that she was a man. When comparing King's portrayal in Art of Fighting with The King of Fighters, Den of Geek criticized the former for how her defeat can cause her body to be exposed. In contrast, the website wrote that she is portrayed in a better light in The King of Fighters thanks to having a more positive position in the Women Fighters Team and thus became a recurring fighter. According to Excite, as the first Art of Fighting game was released there was an urban rumor within the game about the damage cloth happening after defeating King with a special move. This rumor quickly became a hot topic among adolescent boys. The writer from Excite further elaborated that this happened once again in the direct sequel, where people were also looking forward to doing this with Yuri, whereas King was also popular due to the multiple colors; the outfits of each Art of Fighting 2 character could be given to their outfits. When hearing that Yuri and King would be appearing in The King of Fighters 94, a fighting game featuring popular characters from various games, these two characters once again were interesting to male gamers. While these option was removed in later installments, The King of Fighters XIII brought back damaged clothing, which made the younger fans express mixed feelings since they were now adults and, thus dismayed by the handling of the character.

GameRant praised King's multiple fighting styles despite not being as flashy as other fighters. Kakuchoprei celebrated International Women's Day using several gaming characters including King whom he labeled as a tomboy as well as a skilled Muay Thai fighter, which makes her stand out in KOF. In a discussion of trans-characters, AnimeFeminist was curious about the reason for King being dressed as a man in Art of Fighting and regarded SNK's decision not to delve into that as a smart choice, leaving all interpretations to the players. Michigan Daily regarded King and Baiken as subversions of female fighters whose looks and skills are closer to male characters, which contrasts with other male characters with androgynous looks like Ash Crimson.

King's gender identity was also popular in the Thrilling Tales of Old Video Games article "Somehow, King from Art of Fighting Is Not a Gay Character". The writer drew parallels with Eagle from Street Fighter due to their antagonistic roles with gray tones in their debuts as well as their character designs; "both represent European aristocracy but specifically in the sense that both work for the moneyed class; neither actually belongs to it." Despite criticizing how King and Yuri suffer damage clothing, the writer still felt it fair that Ryo Sakazaki could be another victim as he is a man. Despite her manly design, King returns in Art of Fighting 2 with a more feminine look now that she no longer works for Mr. Big. The character's gender ambiguity in Art of Fighting 2 is not explored by the story. By The King of Fighters, the writer noted that King was noticeably a woman naturally, but she also wore manly clothes and wondered if there were signs of homosexuality. The ambiguity is further explored in The King of Fighters XI, where King and Ryo go to a bar together, an act orchestrated by their friends to become intimate. After researching her origins, Cynthia Rothrock's character from Martial Law II: Undercover was seen as a potential inspiration for her design. Game Software Magazine said King's gender is what made her character so popular in her debut where she fought against multiple type of enemies while in The King of Fighters she consistently leads teams of female characters. Her designs was also the subject of praise of its stylish clothing and how it fits her fighting style.
