= Sagat (Street Fighter) =

Street Fighter character

- Street Fighter character
- Sagat in Street Fighter II (1991)
- First appearance: Street Fighter (1987)
- Created by: Takashi Nishiyama
- Designed by: Hiroshi Matsumoto; Akira "Akiman" Yasuda (SFII); Hiromi "Mori" Kotobuki (sprites, SFII); Takayuki Nakayama (SFV)
- Voiced by: English: Isaac C. Singleton Jr. (2009–present); Andrew Klimko (Street Fighter II V ADV dub); Japanese: Shigezu Sasaoka (Street Fighter II: The Animated Movie); Kouji Suizu (SNK vs. Capcom: SVC Chaos); Daisuke Endo (2009–present)
- Portrayed by: Wes Studi (1994 film, game)

In-universe information
- Origin: Thailand
- Nationality: Thai
- Fighting style: Muay Thai

Sagat (Japanese: サガット, Hepburn: Sagatto) is a character from the Japanese fighting game series Street Fighter, created by Capcom. A tall, bald, and muscular Muay Thai fighter from Thailand, he was introduced as the final opponent in the first Street Fighter (1987), serving as the game's sole boss fight. He wears a black eyepatch, hand and feet wraps, and blue shorts with a red waistband; while future games additionally also gave him a noticeable chest scar. Later sequels and spin-offs, such as the Street Fighter Alpha trilogy, would go on to expand his backstory, relationship with series protagonist Ryu, and motivations, as well as make him a playable character; with his moveset being based around tiger motifs and his overwhelming size.

Conceived by Takashi Nishiyama, Sagat was designed by Hiroshi Matsumoto, who drew inspiration from films featuring Kickboxing and Muay Thai.

Sagat has been positively received by critics, primarily for his intimidating screen presence and gradual character development. He has appeared in other media, both related and unrelated to the Street Fighter series, including film, comics, television, and merchandise. The character has also been the subject of analysis regarding similarities to Sagat Petchyindee, stereotypes of Southeast Asians, and his role as a Muay Thai fighter.

== Concept and design ==
Standing 226 centimetres (7 ft 5 in) tall, Sagat is a large and muscular bald man with an eyepatch over his right eye, dressed in shorts and wearing wraps over his lower arms, hands, ankles, and feet. A master Muay Thai fighter, his design was shaped by Hiroshi Matsumoto, also known as Finish Hiroshi, the designer of the original Street Fighter game, who drew inspiration from the surge of Kickboxing and Muay Thai films popular during that era. A special element of Sagat's character is the recurring tiger motif featured in his special moves.

When developing Street Fighter II, the developers decided to reintroduce Sagat from the original Street Fighter as a key returning character competing against the series' protagonist Ryu. Drawing inspiration from storytelling conventions in which past rivals reappear unexpectedly, Sagat was brought back to serve as a familiar adversary. To emphasize his history and prior defeat at the hands of Ryu, the developers gave him a large scar across his chest caused by the Shoryuken, something suggested by animator Hiromi "Mori" Kotobuki. According to character designer Akira "Akiman" Yasuda, the scar was meant to represent his earlier loss and build up his narrative role as a returning rival for the protagonist. As a part of the rivalry, Sagat developed a similar uppercut to the attack that had caused the scar: the Tiger Uppercut.

The origin of Sagat's eye injury is detailed in his backstory from Street Fighter Alpha. As a young fighter, Sagat had long hair and had not yet adopted his bald appearance and eyepatch. He received serious damage to his right eye during an early fight, resulting in partial blindness in that eye. Later, he challenged martial artist Gou Hibiki (father of Dan Hibiki), who purposely exploited Sagat's weakened eye during their fight and broke it. Enraged by this tactic, Sagat killed Hibiki in revenge, a key event that became an essential part of his characterization.

Sagat's character design for Street Fighter V was handled by Naoto "Bengus" Kuroshima under the direction of director Takayuki Nakayama, who decided to change little in regards to the character outside of adding a torn cape to give his character a "story-like feel". Nakayama wanted the cloak to represent his life after Street Fighter II, now living in a village in hiding but at the same time still "exudes an emperor's consideration", hiding his scars to not frighten others. However, as in the series he is considered the "Emperor of Muay Thai", Nakayama still wanted Sagat to have intimidation, and in this manner the cloak made him look larger and put pressure on the design from a higher place. For his gameplay and motion, the motion capture actor was an expert in Muay Thai, and further made technique suggestions that helped develop Sagat for the title.

== Appearances ==
Sagat first appeared in the original Street Fighter game released in 1987 as the final opponent. He later became a regular character in the series, starting with Street Fighter II in 1991. In the earlier games, Sagat was shown as a rival to Ryu and a member of the Shadaloo group. In later titles, his story focused more on his personal growth. He has been featured in several main installments of the series including the Street Fighter Alpha series, Street Fighter IV series, Street Fighter V, and Street Fighter 6, as well as the spin-off Street Fighter EX series. He also made crossover appearances in games such as the Capcom vs. SNK series, Street Fighter X Tekken, Street Fighter X Mega Man, Teppen, Super Smash Bros. Ultimate, and Granblue Fantasy. Sagat was also planned to be included in the Capcom crossover title Capcom Fighting Evolution, based on his appearance in the first Street Fighter, however, he was ultimately cut from the final game.

Sagat has appeared in various media outside the games. He was featured in animated adaptations like Street Fighter II: The Animated Movie, the anime series Street Fighter II V, and the American animated Street Fighter television series. He was portrayed by Wes Studi in the 1994 live-action Street Fighter film and mentioned in the live-action web series Street Fighter: Assassin's Fist. He also made a cameo in the animated film Wreck-It Ralph. He appeared in the 2026 Street Fighter reboot during the animated segments. In the prologue, he is defeated by Ryu and earns his signature scar. He reappears in the mid-credits scene where he joins Bison's group.

In print, Sagat appears in the Malibu Comics and Udon Entertainment's comic series, Street Fighter Alpha, Street Fighter III: Ryu Final, Street Fighter vs. Darkstalkers, and Street Fighter: The Novel: Where Strength Lies. In some of these media, due to Sagat's affiliation with Shadaloo, he is portrayed as more actively villainous than in canon.

== Promotion and reception ==
In January 2018, Saga Prefecture in Japan teamed up with Capcom to launch a promotional campaign called Street Fighter Saga, celebrating the 30th anniversary of Street Fighter II. Sagat was the central part of this collaboration, chosen not only for his popularity but also for the connection between his name and the region of Saga. Acting as a tourism ambassador, he was used to display Saga's local specialties and cultural appeal, especially to Thai visitors, whose numbers had been rising in recent years. The campaign included the opening of the Sagatto Shop in Tokyo's Ginza district, a limited-time store selling exclusive collaboration products featuring Sagat and other Street Fighter II characters. The shop also showcased rare original artwork from the game with regional pride in a creative effort to connect tourists. Sagat was cosplayed by a UFC mixed martial artist, Angela Hill, for which she received positive attention from both the gaming community and combat sports enthusiasts. The official Street Fighter Twitter account praised the gesture, publicly congratulating Hill on earning her post-fight bonus.

Sagat, as Gavin Jasper from Den of Geek describes it, walks a path similar to Ryu's, but his growth comes from tough choices and personal struggles rather than inner peace. Jasper explains that Sagat starts out as a proud and angry man, chasing power and revenge, which leads him to join the criminal group Shadaloo. Over time, he realizes that hatred only takes him so far. Jasper points out how Sagat tries to guide Dan Hibiki, someone he once hurt deeply, away from making the same mistakes. He slowly becomes more thoughtful and disciplined but still keeps his tough and serious nature. Jasper also mentions moments that show how much Sagat has changed, like turning down godlike power in Street Fighter X Tekken and taking bullets to save orphans in the manga Ryu Final. While he shares Ryu's determination to grow stronger, Jasper says Sagat is more direct, intense, and demanding, staying true to his title as "The King of Muay Thai".

Jasper further explains Sagat's journey as one fueled by anger and vengeance, ultimately leading to personal growth and redemption. Originally, Ryu left a deep scar on Sagat with his Shoryuken move during their first encounter, which drove Sagat into a blind fury and obsession with getting a rematch; he even developed his own version of Ryu's move, the Tiger Uppercut. However, Capcom later retconned this origin in the Street Fighter Alpha series, showing Sagat as the stronger fighter who only lost when Ryu, consumed by dark energy called the Satsui no Hado, landed a surprise powerful attack. Jasper points out that while this victory haunted Ryu with doubt, Sagat remained driven by hatred until his former student Adon defeated him, forcing him to reconsider. Jasper emphasizes Sagat's redemption when he helps break Ryu free from M. Bison's brainwashing, proving there is still honor beneath his anger. Their rivalry evolved into mutual respect, and as Jasper notes, the chance to face Ryu again is one of the few things that motivates Sagat.

Michael Grimm of GamesRadar+ criticized one of Sagat's alternate costumes in Super Street Fighter IV as the weakest in comparison to others. Intended to show a younger version of the character, the design falls flat due to its awkward execution, particularly the addition of hair. Grimm points out that Sagat has been bald since his debut, and giving him hair feels as unnatural as shaving Guile's head, making it look more like a horrible wig than a believable style. Aside from removing the eyepatch and scar, the rest of the outfit remains almost identical to Sagat's usual design, leading Grimm to conclude that instead of offering something new, the costume simply seems like a worse version of the original one. In a 2022 Portuguese academic study, scholar Renan Kenji Sales Hayashi discussed how Sagat demonstrates common stereotypes associated with Southeastern Asian countries. He noted that Sagat's Thai background, utilization of Muay Thai, disproportionate height, and intimidating presence all help construct an image that feels exotic and unusual compared to many other fighters in the series.

The authors of the book "Undisputed Street Fighter", Steve Henderstot and Tim Lapetino described Sagat's adoption of the Muay Thai fighting style in Street Fighter as a forward-thinking decision by Capcom when the character debuted in 1987. At the time, Muay Thai was still relatively unknown to many audiences outside of Southeast Asia, particularly in Japan and the West. Over time, however, it became a foundational discipline in professional mixed martial arts (MMA), giving Sagat a lasting sense of realism. MMA fighter Angela Hill, who once cosplayed as Sagat, has likened the character's concept to "a yoga master taking on a Muay Thai kickboxer who throws a fireball", capturing the authenticity that defines Sagat's popularity among both fighting game and combat sports fans. The Spinoff magazine's Don Rowe expressed frustration over Sagat's absence from the base roster of Street Fighter V, heavily criticizing the game's producer, Yoshinori Ono, for the exclusion. He described Ono's reasoning for leaving out Sagat as nonsensical.

=== Real-world comparisons ===
Real-life Muay Thai fighter Sagat Petchyindee has publicly claimed that the character was modeled after him. According to Petchyindee, at the time of the character's creation, he was one of the only well-known Thai fighters named Sagat and had gained popularity through international matches, including baht (Thai currency) in America and Japan. Petchyindee alleged that during a fight in the United States, he sustained an eye injury that required surgery and a protective film to be placed over one eye, an attribute visually similar to the character's eyepatch. He further noted that during the period of his rising fame in Japan, a Japanese promoter involved in his matches later became a major shareholder at Capcom, the developer of Street Fighter, and purportedly contributed to the game's conceptualization.

Sergio Hidalgo of Código Espagueti explored the possible connection between Sagat and Petchyindee, who believes the character was inspired by him and takes pride in that idea. However, Hidalgo noted that Capcom has never officially confirmed the link. He also pointed out major differences between the two, such as Petchyindee's height of 1.65 meters, his full head of hair during fights, and his leaner build at just 63 kilograms, making him shorter, lighter, and visually different than the character. Petchyindee is also noted for using this connection strategically for self-promotion, presenting himself to others as the real-life Sagat. This association has benefited his career, allowing him to be a trainer in countries such as Italy and America. He has traveled and worked globally under the name "Sagat Thailand" to prioritize his relation with the character.
