= Ryo Sakazaki =

Fictional character

- Art of Fighting, Fatal Fury and The King of Fighters character
- Ryo Sakazaki artwork by Tomohiro Nakata
- First game: Art of Fighting (1992)
- Created by: Hiroshi Matsumoto, Takashi Nishiyama
- Designed by: Shinkiro Hiroaki Hashimoto ("Mr. Karate")
- Voiced by: English: Alden Crews (AOF anime); Craig Lee Thomas (FF:COTW); Japanese: Masaki Usui (AOF – Neo Geo Battle Coliseum, KOF XIII); Tetsuya Bessho (AOF anime); Akira Kamiya (Dengeki Bunko drama CD); Masayoshi Kozaki (KOF XII); Daiki Takakura (KOF XIV onwards); Subaru Kimura (KOF for Girls)

In-universe information
- Occupation: Kyokugenryu Karate instructor
- Fighting style: Kyokugenryu Karate
- Family: Takuma Sakazaki (father); Lonette Sakazaki (mother); Yuri Sakazaki (sister)
- Origin: Japan
- Nationality: Japanese-American

Ryo Sakazaki (Japanese: Katakana: リョウ・サカザキ; Kanji: 坂崎 亮(さかざき りょう), Hepburn: Sakazaki Ryō) is a character introduced in the 1992 fighting game Art of Fighting developed by SNK. In the Art of Fighting series, Ryo is depicted as a skilled martial artist who practices his family's fighting style, Kyokugenryu Karate (Japanese: 極限流空手), taught by his father Takuma. After his younger sister Yuri disappears, Ryo and his best friend Robert Garcia search South Town to find her, facing several opponents along the way. While the series follows Ryo's journey as a protector of those he loves, he also regularly appears in the crossover series The King of Fighters, in which he participates in fighting tournaments to promote the Kyokugenryu Karate. He also appears in alternate SNK games as an older fighter named Mr. Karate (Japanese: Mr.カラテ) influenced by his father Takuma. Additionally, he features in several manga adaptations and appears in the anime OVA adaptation of Art of Fighting.

SNK developers Hiroshi Matsumoto and Takashi Nishiyama created Ryo as a homage to Ryu from Capcom's Street Fighter series; the team that produced the first game in the franchise left Capcom to join SNK to produce other games. Ryo's inclusion in The King of Fighters series was decided immediately by the staff as the company wanted to employ characters from its other series in crossover games. SNK artist Hiroaki Hashimoto was responsible for his alter-ego Mr. Karate's design as he wanted to create a new design distinctly different from the original. Multiple voice actors have portrayed Ryo throughout his different appearances.

Video game publications have both praised and criticized Ryo's character. Although Ryo has been criticized for his similarities to the Street Fighter characters, several reviewers have praised his development in several SNK games such as his introduction in Fatal Fury Special and The King of Fighters as one of the first crossover characters. Ryo served as a model for the development of Dan Hibiki, a joke character in the Street Fighter series due to similar designs.

== Creation ==
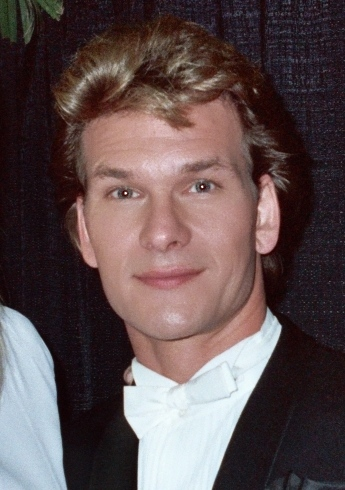
The designers modeled Ryo after Patrick Swayze's appearance.

Ryo Sakazaki was created by Hiroshi Matsumoto and Takashi Nishiyama as an homage to the Capcom character Ryu because during the release of the game, some members from the original Street Fighter video game from Capcom moved to SNK. Artist Shinkiro has said he had no problems with designing Ryo because he related to drawing poor characters in contrast to drawing the other lead Robert Garcia whose depiction as wealthy was more of a problem. The similarities between Ryo and Ryu are addressed in the SNK vs. Capcom crossover games where they often interact.

SNK staff member Youichiro Soeda said that Ryo and Robert's debut was unique to other games based on the company because the story did not focus on fighting tournaments but instead on the duo's quest to save Yuri Sakazaki. Matsumoto has stated that Ryo's and Robert's story are appealing to people thanks to its presentation in cutscenes in contrast to other games that were given animated or printed adaptations that explored the narrative more.

In the planning stage of Fatal Fury Special, another SNK fighting game, bringing Ryo to the installment was elaborated by planner planner Yasuyuki Oda; He believes Ryo fits the cast due to how the franchise borrowed Desperation Moves from Art of Fighting and how it revolutionized the idea of the crossover concept that would conceptualize The King of Fighters. However, as Ryo was announced at the Tokyo Game Show, Oda found such an unpredicted reveal awkward; Fatal Fury Special had several issues at launch in every single console and unlocking Ryo as a hidden boss was too challenging. In some games starting from Fatal Fury: Wild Ambition, Ryo goes by the nickname of "Mr. Karate". Artist Falcoon says this was a reference to how Ryo managed to defeat his father Takuma Sakazaki and thus became worthy of that title. Writer Akihiko Ureshino originally aimed to give Ryo a bigger role in the Fatal Fury series where he would fight a revived Geese Howard but was rejected by members from editorial Shinseisha. The concept would have been villain Geese reviving and an aged Ryo settles things with him.

Ryo was first voiced by Masaki Usui. Starting in 2016 with The King of Fighters XIV, Usui was replaced by Daiki Takakura who wanted to promote his character's appearances. Takakura believes his role as Ryo is important because the character appeared on multiple generations of consoles and he wanted to keep its traditional style despite having a different voice. For the otome game, The King of Fighters: For Girls, Subaru Kimura voices the character. Alden Crews voiced Ryo in the English dub of the anime special.

=== Portrayal and design ===
Not satisfied with the original Ryo, Hiroaki Hashimoto redesigned him as middleaged warrior for Buriki One (left) and Wild Ambition (right).

The character was modeled after American actor Patrick Swayze. Often dealing with his school in Art of Fighting and The King of Fighters, by the time of Garou: Mark of the Wolves, Ryo is still in his position as the head of Kyokugen-ryu karate, and he retreats to the mountains to train. Ureshino claims the goal is not to reach the goal of being the strongest, but rather he is the type who wants to keep getting stronger, even if it is just a little at a time. As a result, Ureshino describes Ryo as a man who will find it difficult in modern society and never marries his love interest King. The developers added that The King of Fighters '94 was created with the idea of having Ryo fighting against Terry Bogard, the lead character of the Fatal Fury series. Ryo and Yuri do not tend to be unable to get involved in the main story and end up in comical roles in contrast to the more serious style from Art of Fighting. In regards to the masked Mr. Karate from the spin-off Maximum Impact 2, Ureshino decided to give him the age of 49, making him the oldest character of the title.

Ryo's appearance changes among games. He is normally blonde, and wears a vermilion or orange gi first tailored by her. Beneath the orange gi, he wears a black shirt, which was omitted in Art of Fighting 2. He keeps wearing his original Art of Fighting design in both Fatal Fury Special and all The King of Fighters games. Ryo's redesign as middle-aged was created by SNK artist Hiroaki Hashimoto who oversaw the character designs in Fatal Fury: Wild Ambition and Buriki One as he disliked the original look. The biggest change was Ryo's clothes, which featured more black and give him more facial hair symbolizing his older age. Hiroaki believed that black clothing made Ryo's face stand out. Changing the design of a central and popular SNK character was risky, but Hiroaki's seniors gave him freedom with the stipulation that the design should look cool. He is specifically written to be 32 years old because "he is physically and mentally accomplished as a fighter".

His normal costume for the Maximum Impact series is the same as the martial arts uniform he has worn in Art of Fighting, The King of Fighters and Fatal Fury Special. There is a change of mood concerning his "Color F" reminiscent of Haohmaru from Samurai Shodown. Regarding his "Color G~H", his refined sense is shown through his braided hat, ruler, and mountain ascetic style. For the "Mr. Karate" incarnation of Ryo, his Normal has been given a tengu mask, which is reminiscent of his father Takuma. With his "Another" incarnation there is a stylish change of clothing based on his Wild Ambition look. The color combination of his shirt is standard, but there is also a version just like his "Color E" with a design on his back. "Color G" appears as a style that brings to mind the clothing of Robert. In the 2016 game The King of Fighters XIV a costume depicting Ryo's appearance in Wild Ambition was originally supposed to appear as one of the DLC alternate costumes but was debunked.

=== Gameplay ===
Ryo's fighting style is known as the Kyokugenryu Karate which he practices with Robert and his family. He earns the nickname, "The Invincible Dragon" (無敵の龍, Muteki no Ryū) because of his remarkable use of his fighting style. Ryo's basic move is the projectile Ko-Ou Ken (虎煌拳, lit. "Tiger Spark/Gleam Fist") which frequently appears differently in several games. Game designer Nobuyuki Kuroki joined SNK and to oversee his animations in the third game of the series as he claims always admired previous works.

For The King of Fighters '94, the developers had difficulty balancing Ryo and Robert against the other characters and aimed to do so without removing any of their special moves. However, Ryo was said to be one of the game's strongest characters. From The King of Fighters '96 onwards, Tiago Oviedo Frosi noted Ryo imitates Oyama's fighting pose while also borrowing elements from the Wadō-ryū karate created by Hironori Ōtsuka who was inspired by the Shotokan as well as the Jujutsu. The developers for The King of Fighters XIII wanted to distance Ryo's style from those of Robert Garcia and Takuma Sakazaki since both employ the same techniques. Ryo's moves were designed to show his strength. His moves leave him open which resulted in the designers balancing his character by creating a stronger version of his Tiger Fist for easier combos. His "Neo Max" move, the strongest type of move in the game, has the image of being One Blow Guaranteed Kill (一撃必殺, Ichigeki Hissatsu), so his moves were finalized without difficulty. TheGamer noted his appearance in The King of Fighters XV abandoned his KOF '96 stance from previous games in favor of his original Art of Fighting look, resulting in a bigger muscle tone as a result.

In Buriki One, Ryo's gameplay was developed to convey a sense of realism alongside the rest of the cast to the point he cannot perform projectile maneuvers. In his other appearances as Mr. Karate, Ryo uses both his original moves as well as Takuma's.

== Appearances ==
=== In video games ===
In the first Art of Fighting, Ryo and his best friend Robert Garcia go on a mission to save the former's sister, Yuri, who was kidnapped by Mr. Big, a local criminal mastermind. The two martial artists manage to confront Mr. Big, leading him to a karate dojo where a masked man challenges the two to a fight. When Ryo prevails, Yuri appears to stop Ryo and reveals that the masked man is their father, Takuma. In the second game, Art of Fighting 2, Takuma reveals that the mafia overlord Geese Howard turned him into an assassin. With the Sakazaki family reunited, they, along with Robert, are focused on exacting their revenge on Geese and providing justice to those Geese had wronged. While entering into Geese's tournament, The King of Fighters, Ryo defeats Geese who manages to escape with help from his assistants. In Art of Fighting 3: The Path of the Warrior, Ryo acts as a supporting character to Robert, as the game focuses on Robert and Yuri's worldwide search for their missing friend. In his ending, Ryo expressed approval of Robert and Yuri's apparent relationship.

Ryo also appears as a guest character in Fatal Fury Special, an updated version of Fatal Fury 2. He appears as a hidden opponent at the end of the single-player mode and is a playable character in the home versions. In the PlayStation version of Fatal Fury: Wild Ambition, Ryo uses the title of "Mr. Karate", as an aged and more powerful version of the character. In Garou: Mark of the Wolves he is mentioned indirectly by his student, Marco Rodrigues and he later makes an appearance in Marco's and Robert's endings in Fatal Fury: City of the Wolves.

Ryo is a member of the Art of Fighting Team in The King of Fighters series in his young form from Art of Fighting. Despite multiple changes to the team roster, Ryo remains a core member, seeking to promote his karate. Across the series, Ryo develops a close friendship with his former foe, Muay Thai fighter King, which his family supports. The spin-off games King of Fighters R-1 and King of Fighters R-2 feature Ryo as part of the South Town Team. He also appears in the spin-off The King of Fighters Kyo, in which he helps the main character Kyo Kusanagi find his girlfriend Yuki. The spin-off games KOF: Maximum Impact and Maximum Impact 2 also feature Ryo as a playable character with the latter also featuring an elder version of his "Mr. Karate" persona as a hidden character. He is present in the mobile phone games The King of Fighters All Star and Kimi wa Hero with the latter as his older "Mr. Karate" persona, and in his regular persona in the otome game King of Fighters for Girls. The KOF Chronicles mobile game features Ryo. He is also playable in The Rhythm Of Fighters and The King of Fighters Online. He again appears in his two personas in the mobile game The King of Fighters '98 Unlimited Match Online.

Ryo is also a central character in the 1999 game Buriki One in his older persona and fights in a grappling tournament, employing regular karate as his fighting style in the World Grapple Tournament. In NeoGeo Battle Coliseum, Ryo goes by the name "2nd Mr. Karate" (二代目Mr.カラテ, Nidaime Misutā Karate), while his look is the one used for Buriki One. He also stars in the crossover video games SNK vs. Capcom in his classic look. Despite not being playable in SNK Gals' Fighters and SNK Heroines: Tag Team Frenzy, he appears in Yuri's endings. His appearance serves as a chibi costume for Nintendo's fighting game Super Smash Bros. Ultimate.

=== In other media ===
Ryo appears in the anime OVA version of Art of Fighting from 1993. While looking for a cat, Ryo and Robert witness a murder related to a stolen diamond. After fighting the murdering mobsters, they discover that the top mobster, Mr. Big, has kidnapped Ryo's sister to exchange her for the diamond which he believes to be in the possession of the protagonists. He is voiced by Tetsuya Besho in the Japanese version, and by Alden Crews in the English adaptation. Two mangas based on the Art of Fighting games also follow Ryo and Robert's journey.

Ryo also appears in the manhua adaptations from The King of Fighters series, which tells how Ryo participates in the fighting tournaments. Manga and novels based on KOF also feature Ryo but in a smaller role. In the CGI animated series, The King of Fighters: Destiny, Ryo reprises his role from The King of Fighters '94 where they meet and befriend the Esaka Team. During the tournament, Ryo and Robert are possessed by the power of the creature Orochi but are saved by the Esaka members. There is also an episode that shows Ryo saving Yuri from the King's forces based on the first Art of Fighting game. He also appears in the manga The King of Fighters: A New Beginning where he faces and defeats newcomer Shun'ei.

== Reception ==
=== Promotion and merchandise ===
This Art of Fighting scene involving Ryo became an internet meme that influenced marketing and gaming in general.

As part of an official partnership between SNK and Akiba, Ryo has appeared on an Akiba beer bottle label for one of their craft beers alongside other characters from Art of Fighting 3 and Fatal Fury 3. In a cutscene from the first Art of Fighting game, Ryo says "I have no choice but to use the Haoh Shokoken" (覇王翔吼拳を使わざるを得ない, Haōshōkōken o tsukawazaru o enai) while he is driving a bike in his fighting clothes. According to PR Times, this became an internet meme based on how hilarious it is that a man is driving while wearing a karate gi. This became popular in some Internet communities, regardless of the excitement it generated among individuals. It then spread to the Westerns and has become one of the classic internet memes in the fighting game world, such as marketing for the visual novel The King of Fighters For Girls.

Ryo's birthday was parodied by SNK using marketing that also includes his bike meme. Several Japanese writers for multiple websites played the game specifically to enjoy such meme. Merchandise such as clothing based on it was developed. SNK artist Falcoon was caught by surprise when a friend showed him wearing a shirt featuring such a meme. For Netmarble's The King of Fighters All Star mobile game, the original Art of Fighting meme involving Ryo was used. Developers behind All Star wondered if it was okay to use such a meme but and ended up okay to go along with celebrating the first anniversary of the game. As a result, they decided to go with "a bang".

=== Critical response ===
In regards to how the media saw the character, Wesley Yin-Poole of Videogamer.com commented that Ryo and Robert are "two double-hard bastards": The two were often compared to the Street Fighter protagonists Ryu and Ken Masters due to physical similarities and moves, eventually leading Capcom to create their joke character Dan Hibiki from the Street Fighter. Dan was meant to be a joke about both Ryo and Robert as SNK "stole the talent" from their own company when they started making their own Street Fighter sequels. IGN also compared Ryo with Dragon Ball characters based on the type of fighting techniques as well as designs with the former being noted to inspire Marvel vs. Capcom.TheGamer said that despite the character's original popularity, if shown to a random viewer they would be confused with who he is and still believe he was a Dragon Ball character due to his design. While AnimeOnDVD enjoyed the contrast between Ryo and Robert in the Art of Fighting original video animation, HardCoreGaming felt Ryo was unfaithful to the original game and "awful". Futaman Fubanet said that while both protagonists come across as strong characters, in the TV special they are more comical with Tetsuya Bessho providing a strong voice acting to the character. In "Os reis da luta: representações do karate nos jogos digitais", Tiago Oviedo Frosi from the Federal University of Rio Grande do Sul wrote that Gichin Funakoshi's "Shōtōkan" is the most practiced style of Karate in the world, this was the style chosen to characterize most of the Street Fighter characters. The Kyokugenryu Ryo uses in Art of Fighting instead comes across as a fantasy version of the "knockout" Kyokushinkaikan created by Mas Oyama who serves as an influence for both Ryu's and Takuma's characters. The writer noted that the character Ryo was a creation of SNK to openly oppose the Street Fighter series and Ryu. Ryo's style is noted to be influenced by Gōgen Yamaguchi which contrasts Ryu's Mas Oyama when they are put in crossover games. Frosi and Felipe Frosi from Universidade Federal do Ceará noted Ryo was a major contrast to his sister who came across as a replica of the idealized stereotype for women. As a result, Ryo comes across as a sexist who contrast the more modern views of a woman when opposing her growth as a warrior. Capcom also had complaints about Ryo's and Terry Bogard's projectile technique Ko-Ou Ken and Power Wave, respectively, were executed with the same input as Ryu and Ken's Hadoken.

Game Software Magazine said Ryo's attire clearly identifies him as a karate master. Like Ryu and Ken, Ryo always wears his unchanging karate uniform to face challenge after challenge. As a Japanese man, his blond hair was highly suspicious, raising doubts about his foreign ancestry. Overall, Ryo is a rather rough and carefree man, very particular about space. He also comes across as charming thanks to his relationship with his sister as he raised her. Still, he complained about the lack of development of his and King's relationship, hoping their situation would not end as hopeless as Terry Bogard's.

The character has also been popular for his crossover appeal in Fatal Fury and The King of Fighters. Rolling Stone said Ryo's popularity in Fatal Fury Special was so famous that it inspired the concept of The King of Fighters whereas the Capcom VS. SNK was also popular for making the Art of Fighting duo be able to face their own parody, Dan Hibiki. Den of Geek regarded his debut in Fatal Fury Special as the "first real fighting game crossover". Gabriel Keene Von Koenig from Centro Universitário de Brasília Soares notes that Ryo's inclusion in the Fatal Fury Special was iconic due to the iconic music SNK put in the game when Ryo appeared as a hidden boss. Souya Shinsuke from Futabanet drew parallels between Ryo and Akuma from Super Street Fighter II Turbo due to their iconic hidden inclusions which were made nearly the same time and both were the first fighting games to include such option. Both Ryo and Akuma stand out for giving the player a notable challenge to unlock but the writer still found them enjoyable to find despite admitting he also did not meet requirements. Ryo becoming a middle-aged fighter in Fatal Fury: Wild Ambition was noted to be more fitting to the story by Hardcore Gaming as it fits with the series' chronology more than Fatal Fury Special which had his adult persona.

The site Hobby Consolas noted that Ryo debuted in The King of Fighters '94 and surprised fans due to the crossover appeal. Atomix found Ryo's inclusion in Team Mexico confusing for the game since the character happens to be Japanese-American in contrast to Mexican fighters. Den of Geek criticized Ryo's KOF characterization as one of the worst-developed characters due to how he plays the role of the "straight man". His victory quote from The King of Fighters '98 "Absolute karate. That's Kyokugen. And don't forget it, dweebenheimer" has become known as one of SNK's weirdest localization as dweebenheimer has no meaning. In regards to the character's relationship with King, Thrilling Tales of Old Video Games lamented the two were portrayed as ambiguous towards each other despite Yuri's attempt to make their dinner in The King of Fighters XI be romantic. Tiago Oviedo Frosi said the handling of Mr. Karate's ego by Ryo and Takuma is noted to be influenced by the religion Shintoism, which inspired the mask of the Tengu creature that Takuma and Ryo often wear. Outside Art of Fighting and KOF, Ryo was noted to stand out thanks to his guest appearance in Buriki One. In retrospect, Gamer TW said that when explored in The King of Fighters Chinese comics, Ryo was one of the weakest character when compared with Kyo Kusanagi and Terry Bogard despite being a protagonist. With the introduction of K', Ryo was at the same level of the new The King of Fighters protagonist as both were was poorly received due to lacking the appeal of other heroes.
