= Hiroshi Matsumoto (game designer) =

Japanese game designer

Hiroshi Matsumoto (Japanese: 松本 裕司, Hepburn: Matsumoto Hiroshi) is a Japanese game designer.

== Works ==
Nicknamed "Finish", Matsumoto worked in the 1980s as a planner for the Capcom company and later moved to SNK where he became a director. Matsumoto was a planner in the first Street Fighter game working with director Takashi Nishiyama. He was influenced by the idea of a fighting game where they could explore martial arts. Matsumoto and Nishiyama ended up coming up with these ideas together, to give the game deeper story and character elements. Nishiyama thinks it became a trend at the time to incorporate these kinds of elements into games. Nishiyama would have loved to have more playable characters, but Capcom were only able to put in just the two of them: Ryu and Ken Masters as playable characters. Matsumoto had to teach the programmer staff about the making of the games to develop it. Matsumoto regrets issue with developer Okamoto almost left Street Fighter as an incomplete game until further help. Following mixed responses to prices and gameplay, Matsumoto saw president Kenzo Tsujimoto happy with the game thanks to the sales it achieved.

Shortly after Street Fighter's release, a headhunter approached Nishiyama and convinced him to leave Capcom and join nearby studio SNK. Nishiyama took Matsumoto and the majority of his team with him and abandoned the Street Fighter IP. In SNK, Matsumoto directed the fighting game Art of Fighting starring the leads Ryo Sakazaki and Robert Garcia who fight people in the city of Southtown to rescue the missing Yuri Sakazaki. The cast were created by Hiroshi Matsumoto as an homage to the Capcom fighting games' characters. Matsumoto has stated that he felt he was appealing to people who did not usually play games by showing the story in the game instead of just media such as magazines and comics.

Matsumoto was also involved in the Fatal Fury: King of Fighters fighting games created by Nishikiyama. The game focuses on Terry Bogard, Andy Bogard and Joe Higashi entering into The King of Fighters tournament to avenge Jeff Bogard killed by host Geese Howard. The second Art of Fighting incorporated Geese Howard due to his popularity in Fatal Fury and his younger look from the first original video animation as a hidden boss. Matsumoto kept working in Fatal Fury 2 in 1992 with an expanded cast from the original cast besides the original trio.
