= Robert Garcia (Art of Fighting) =

SNK video game character

- Art of Fighting, Fatal Fury and The King of Fighters character
- Robert Garcia in The King of Fighters XIII by Eisuke Ogura
- First game: Art of Fighting (1992)
- Created by: Hiroshi Matsumoto
- Voiced by: English: Nick Sullivan (AOF anime); River Vitae (FF:COTW); Japanese: Eiji Yano (AOF); Kay Inage (AOF2, KOF '94–'95, NeoGeo Battle Coliseum, KOF XI–XIII); Mantarou Kouichi (AOF3, KOF '96–2003); Masanori Ikeda (AOF anime); Hideo Ishikawa (Dengeki Bunko drama CD); Go Shinomiya (KOF XIV onwards); Kazuhiro Okamoto (KOF for Girls)

In-universe information
- Fighting style: Kyokugenryu Karate
- Origin: Italy
- Nationality: Italian

Robert Garcia (Japanese: ロバート・ガルシア, Hepburn: Robāto Garushia) is a video game character created by the Japanese video game company SNK. He was introduced in the 1992 fighting game Art of Fighting as the best friend of Ryo Sakazaki, the game's lead character. The game has both of them as practitioners of the Kyokugenryu Karate (Japanese: 極限流空手) fighting style who search for Ryo's younger sister, Yuri Sakazaki, who was kidnapped by a criminal named Mr. Big. He is additionally featured in most of The King of Fighters (KOF) crossover games, in which he enters a King of Fighters tournament as one of a team composed of three members. Thus far, he has been a playable character in every edition of KOF except The King of Fighters XI; however, he returned in the PlayStation 2 version of the game. Besides Art of Fighting and The King of Fighters, an older Robert has appeared as downloadable content in the video game Fatal Fury: City of the Wolves, but under the name "Mr. Karate III" (Mr.カラテ; lit. "The Third Mr. Karate"). Robert appeared in the film adaptation of Art of Fighting and the manhua from The King of Fighters.

In Art of Fighting, Robert and Ryo were created to play notable roles in the narrative. Across his appearances, Robert's design has changed, influenced by multiple famous actors, though his gameplay has remained consistent, focusing on kicks, in contrast to Ryo's punches. The character was also used several times in crossovers, which led to revisions in The King of Fighters and a major redesign in Fatal Fury to tease a future installment in the Art of Fighting series.

Robert received mixed reviews from video game publications. Some praised his design, but some also noted similarities between him and characters from Street Fighter, which eventually led Capcom, the company behind Street Fighter, to make their own parody character. His inclusion in the Fatal Fury series as "Mr. Karate III", the nickname Takuma and Ryo often used in previous SNK games, surprised journalists and gamers. Nevertheless, it received an overall positive response based on his new design and how he still incorporates classic martial arts techniques from previous games.

== Creation and design ==
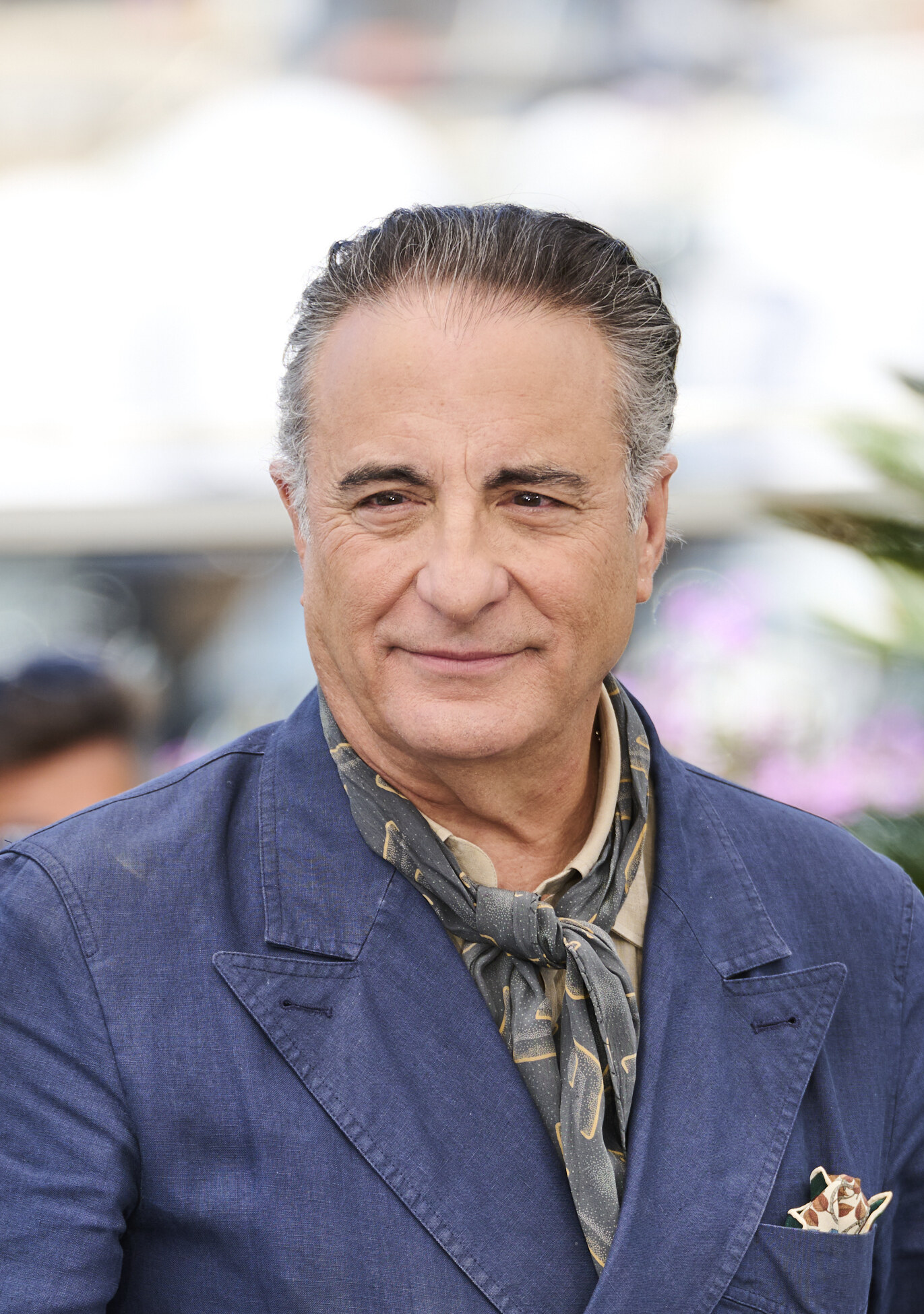
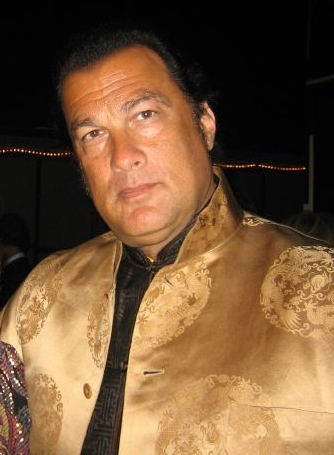
Robert's image was inspired by Andy Garcia (left) and Steven Seagal.

Robert Garcia was based on the actors Steven Seagal and Andy Garcia. SNK staff member Youichiro Soeda said that Ryo and Robert's debut was unique to other of the company's games because it did not focus on fighting tournaments but instead of the duo's quest to save Yuri Sakazaki. Creator Hiroshi Matsumoto made Art of Fighting story driven, which was uncommon in fighting games, to make the characters more appealing. Artist Shinkiro once stated in an interview that he had difficulty designing Robert due to having "no idea how rich people act or behave".

For the second Art of Fighting game, SNK kept the same outfit for Robert, having rejected three other concept outfits. Robert's appearance in Art of Fighting 2 shows his background, as someone coming from wealth, by featuring his butler and his father, who is the head of a business corporation. Robert eventually abandons the study of martial arts to succeed his father in the business. According to writer Akihiko Ureshino, while both Robert and Yuri are more talented than Ryo, Ryo will eventually surpass them both due to their different personal lives. In the third Art of Fighting, the game was noted as a gaiden (lit. "alternative story") as the result of the story focusing now on Robert, rather than on Ryo. In Art of Fighting 3, Robert was given a new outfit which would be reincorporated in The King of Fighters series. Voice actor Mantaro Koichi found Robert's appearance manly and compared his poses to tokusatsu characters.

In the making of The King of Fighters, Robert was made "the slimmest of them all" in comparison to his original design. His Osaka accent was in accord with Psycho Soldier character Sie Kensou, and both of them had the traits of comedians. His original moves in The King of Fighters '94 were considered too overpowering, which led to revisions in the sequel The King of Fighters '95. The developers for The King of Fighters XIII wanted Robert to be able to perform almost any type of martial arts technique. Robert's special moves were created to be highly accessible while also highlighting his focus on kicks. Robert's final technique was inspired by the leader's super special move from The King of Fighters 2003. SNK wanted to incorporate a power-up into it, which led to the final presentation. His strongest move in XIII is an enhanced version of Hien Ryujin Kyaku (Flying Swallow Dragon God Kick), but it can be performed from both the ground and the air. The staff noted that back in The King of Fighters XII, Robert lacked distinctive moves, something from which they believe Iori Yagami also suffered. SNK worked to make Robert appealing, as they all liked him. Due to fears that Robert's outfit might seem dated, SNK revised his look for The King of Fighters XIV to make him stand out more by giving him a redesign based on an unspecified American actor. In several games in the series, Robert's gameplay was changed from the classic shoto archetype and instead became a charge character where a player uses defensive tactics while performing the same techniques. Both versions are playable in The King of Fighters 2002 Unlimited Match.

In the crossover fighting game Neo Geo Battle Coliseum, Robert Garcia was given a new design similar to Art of Fighting 3, but he was made to be older. For Fatal Fury: City of the Wolves, Robert was added as downloadable content (DLC). Since Art of Fighting character Mr. Big was already part of the initial roster, Director Hayato Konya wanted to add more crossover elements between Fatal Fury and Art of Fighting. Konya initially considered using Ryo and Yuri as potential DLCs as teasers for a potential new Art of Fighting game. Konya believed the original Mr. Karate was one of the most famous icons in SNK history, even moreso than Terry Bogard, and thus considered adding Mr. Karate to provide further depth to the story. As a hint to his true identity, Mr. Karate was given a distinct Italian accent, and moves focused on kicks. Since Ryo had taken the nickname of Mr. Karate II in a previous SNK game, Konya believed it would be fitting if Robert instead took the name Mr. Karate III and add a sense of confusion to gamers who would wonder where Ryo is.

== Appearances ==
In Art of Fighting, Robert Garcia is a martial artist who joins his friend Ryo Sakazaki to find the missing Yuri Sakazake, who was kidnapped by the criminal Mr. Big. After defeating Mr. Big, Ryo and Robert face an assassin named Mr. Karate but are stopped by Yuri. The second Art of Fighting game features Robert, Ryo, Takuma, and Yuri entering the first King of Fighters tournament held by Geese Howard, the main responsible for the kidnap. In Art of Fighting 3: The Path of the Warrior, Robert visits Central America to help Freya Lawrence, a childhood friend, save her brother Wyler, whose demonic power made him go berserk. In his ending, Robert stops Wyler and goes back to Italy. However, before entering the plane, Yuri shows up to accompany him.

In The King of Fighters series, Takuma, Ryo, and Robert are part of the Art of Fighting Team, but in some games they form different alliances. Robert is absent in the arcade version of The King of Fighters XI, but the PlayStation 2 version features him as an unlockable character. Alongside an aged Ryo Sakazaki from Buriki One, an aged Robert appears in NeoGeo Battle Coliseum. In his ending, it is revealed that Robert wishes to stay away from his family business and still work to teach the Kyokugen Ryu style. Outside Art of Fighting and The King of Fighters, an older version of Robert appears a playable character in Fatal Fury: City of the Wolves, via downloadable content, in which he enters the King of Fighters tournament to try and unlock the final secret Kyokugen technique, using the alias of Mr. Karate to hide his identity. In promoting the DLC, Rando Ayamine wrote a one-shot manga focused on Robert's mission.

Robert is also present in the mobile phone games Metal Slug Defense, The King of Fighters '98 Unlimited Match Online, and Kimi wa Hero. The dating sim Days of Memories also features him. Although he is not playable in SNK vs. Capcom: SVC Chaos, Robert is often mentioned by other characters and has a cameo in the ending. Another cameo of him is in Yuri's ending from SNK Heroines: Tag Team Frenzy. He is also present in as well as the otome game King of Fighters for Girls.

Robert also appears in the anime Art of Fighting (1993). The plot of the film is loosely based on the first Art of Fighting game, with Robert and Ryo searching for Yuri, who has been kidnapped by Mr. Big. He is voiced by Masanori Ikeda in the Japanese version of the film, and by Nick Sullivan in the English adaptation. Two mangas based on the Art of Fighting games also follow Robert's role in the games. Robert is featured in the manhua adaptations from The King of Fighters series, which tell of his participation in the fighting tournaments.

== Reception ==
Critical response to Robert's role in Art of Fighting was mixed. Videogamer.com writer Wesley Yin-Poole labeled Robert and Ryo as "two double-hard bastards" and commented that they had the best designs from the Art of Fighting series in comparison to the other characters, who had "wicked" appearances. Spanner Spencer from Eurogamer added that Robert had the best appearance from all the characters of the Art of Fighting series, but labelled him as a "greasy yuppie". Juan E. Hernandez from IGN also compared both Robert and Ryo to Street Fighter, as well as to Dragon Ball characters, based on their fighting techniques. Greg Kasavin from GameSpot listed Robert's "Haohshokohken" move from Art of Fighting as one of the most influential fireball moves in the history of fighting games. The character of Dan Hibiki from the Street Fighter series is deemed a parody of Ryo due to his similarities with Ryu and Ken, but his design is so similar to Robert's that in SVC Chaos, characters often confuse Dan with Robert. Dan was meant to be a joke, referencing both Ryo and Robert, as SNK "stole the talent" from their own company when they started making their own Street Fighter sequels. With the promotion that Robert and Ryo got in The King of Fighters XV, Raúl Velásquez from TheGamer saw the trailer as one of SNK's multiple answers to Dan's character, especially his role in Street Fighter V, while elaborating on how much Robert contrasts with Ryo's fighting style, despite the two fighters practicing the same martial art.

There was commentary about his role in Art of Fighting 3 and his origins. While Den of Geek compared him to Street Fighter character Ken Masters based on their similar personalities, few people cared about such protagonist roles in the third installment, despite its being the lead. In retrospect, Thrilling Tales of Old Video Games noted Art of Fighting 3 was nicknamed Gaiden in Japan to further clarify that this installment was focused on Robert rather than Ryo. This led to analysis of why Robert's story takes place in Mexico as he considers his last name Garcia as an indication that he is Mexican, though SNK's developers claimed he is actually of Italian descendant. This often confused people because he represents Mexico in The King of Fighters '94. Though Robert is the protagonist in a story set in Mexico, it is suggested he at least grew up in such a country with a friend of his having a Mexican sounding name, Friea Lawrence. The Mexican company Evoga originally thought Robert was Mexican due to the team being called Mexico in The King of Fighters '94; yet Art of Fighting 3 revealed he was Italian much to their amusement.

In "Os reis da luta: representações do karate nos jogos digitais", Tiago Oviedo Frosi from the Federal University of Rio Grande do Sul wrote that Gichin Funakoshi's Shōtōkan is the most practiced style of Karate in the world, this was the style chosen to characterize most of the Street Fighter characters. The Kyokugenryu Robert uses in Art of Fighting instead comes across as a fantasy version of the "knockout" Kyokushinkaikan style created by Mas Oyama, who serves as an influence for both Ryu's and Takuma's characters. The writer noted that the characters of Robert and Ryo was a creation of SNK to openly oppose the Street Fighter series.

=== Portrayal in Fatal Fury: City of the Wolves ===
Robert's inclusion in City of the Wolves surprised multiple gamers and journalists for taking disguise and nickname of Mr. Karate previously used by Takuma and Ryo.

There were various reactions to Robert's role in Fatal Fury: City of the Wolves. The first trailer of Robert's Mr. Karate persona confused GamerFocus writers for making it look as though SNK was teasing a fourth Art of Fighting by using the tengu mask Takuma Sakazaki wears as the final boss in the first game as well as Robert's coin seen in the series. According to Diario de Mexico, people expected that Mr. Karate would be Ryo Sakazaki as he bore that name in Fatal Fury: Wild Ambition and the spin-off KOF: Maximum Impact 2, which surprised people when Robert was revealed to be the one bearing that name instead. In retrospect, the writer called Robert one of SNK's most important characters, alongside Ryo, based on their origins in Art of Fighting and further appearances in other SNK's work for nearly 20 years. Maxime Chao from Jeuxactu was also surprised about Robert being the new Mr. Karate rather than Takuma or Ryo. Since Takuma had originally worn the tengu mask during his criminal era, Chao wondered what kind of business did SNK put Robert into to make him wear the mask and also take the nickname.

LevelUP noted a similar confusion among players in regards to the meaning of Mr. Karate up until Robert was revealed to be a Fatal Fury DLC. Fernando Salinas from LevelUP said that Robert stands out despite being Mr. Karate, thanks to his stylish business clothes in contrast to the karate gi Ryo and Takuma used to wear. He found Robert to be a stronger version of the Mr. Karate from The King of Fighters XIII based on his gameplay features. As a result, Salinas highly praised the persona Robert takes as it makes him worthy of being a Fatal Fury character. According to IGN, Robert's debut in City of the Wolves surprised several gamers for taking the title of Mr. Karate despite not being a Sakazaki like Takuma or Ryo, especially with his tengu mask previously worn by his teacher and rival. Though Robert is masked and does not show his face, his true identity was easy to recognize based on his clothing and the coin that originated in his previous appearances; and he still has the "Tiger" nickname which signifies his dynamic with Ryo Sakazaki's Dragon since their debut in Art of Fighting. Alejandro Dau from Tecnogaming said that the name Mr. Karate was famous in SNK history since 1992 due to the challenge Takuma Sakazaki posed to the player as the final boss from the first Art of Fighting game. Future installments led to Ryo taking the nickname and this time it was Robert's chance to embrace it, something that would become obvious as both of his voice actors tried giving him a distinct Italian accent.
