= NEOGEO Station =

NEOGEO Station was a brand by M2 for downloadable Neo Geo games that were previously available to be purchased from the PlayStation Store for Sony's PlayStation 3 (PS3), PlayStation Portable (PSP) and PlayStation Vita (PSV) video game consoles in all regions. All games in this series have been de-listed from the PlayStation Store. This list does not include PlayStation games ported from Neo Geo that were released as PS One Classics.

Title	Developer	First released	Release date		
Title	Developer	First released	North America	Europe	Japan
Art of Fighting	SNK	2010-12-21^{NA}	December 21, 2010	December 22, 2010	December 22, 2010
Alpha Mission II	SNK	2010-12-21^{NA}	December 21, 2010	December 22, 2010	December 22, 2010
Baseball Stars 2	SNK	2011-07-14^{JP}	July 19, 2011	August 24, 2011	July 14, 2011
Baseball Stars Professional	SNK	2010-12-21^{NA}	December 21, 2010	December 22, 2010	December 22, 2010
Fatal Fury: King of Fighters	SNK	2010-12-21^{NA}	December 21, 2010	December 22, 2010	December 22, 2010
League Bowling	SNK	2010-12-21^{NA}	December 21, 2010	December 22, 2010	December 22, 2010
Magician Lord	Alpha Denshi	2010-12-21^{NA}	December 21, 2010	December 22, 2010	December 22, 2010
Metal Slug	Nazca Corporation	2010-12-21^{NA}	December 21, 2010	December 22, 2010	December 22, 2010
Metal Slug 2	SNK	2011-09-29^{JP}	October 11, 2011	March 28, 2012	September 29, 2011
Samurai Shodown	SNK	2010-12-21^{NA}	December 21, 2010	December 22, 2010	December 22, 2010
Shock Troopers	Saurus	2011-08-25^{JP}	August 30, 2011	March 28, 2012	August 25, 2011
Super Sidekicks	SNK	2010-12-21^{NA}	December 21, 2010	December 22, 2010	December 22, 2010
The King of Fighters '94	SNK	2010-12-21^{NA}	December 21, 2010	December 22, 2010	December 22, 2010
The King of Fighters '95	SNK	2011-07-14^{JP}	July 19, 2011	August 3, 2011	July 14, 2011
The King of Fighters '96	SNK	2011-09-29^{JP}	October 11, 2011	March 28, 2012	September 29, 2011
World Heroes	Alpha Denshi	2011-08-25^{JP}	August 30, 2011	December 21, 2011	August 25, 2011
