= Dan Hibiki =

Street Fighter character

- Street Fighter character
- Dan in Street Fighter Alpha 3 (1998)
- First appearance: Street Fighter Alpha: Warriors' Dreams (1995)
- Portrayed by: Andrew Schulz (2026 film)
- Voiced by: English: Ted Sroka (Street Fighter IV, Street Fighter X Tekken, Street Fighter V); Bob Papenbrook (Street Fighter Alpha: The Animation); Japanese: Osamu Hosoi (all but SFIV); Kazuyuki Ishikawa (Street Fighter Alpha: The Animation); Toshiyuki Kusuda (Street Fighter IV, Street Fighter X Tekken, Street Fighter V)

In-universe information
- Fighting style: Saikyo-style karate
- Origin: Hong Kong
- Nationality: Japanese-Hong Konger

Dan Hibiki (Japanese: 火引 弾, Hepburn: Hibiki Dan) is a character from Capcom's Street Fighter fighting game franchise. Introduced in Street Fighter Alpha (1995), Dan is consistently portrayed as an overconfident, arrogant and utterly feeble character. In the series' storyline, Dan was a student trained by Gouken—elder brother of Akuma—who also trained Ken and Ryu. Gouken stopped training Dan once he acknowledged the ulterior reasons Dan has in his mind. Dan's goal is to defeat fellow fighter Sagat, who killed Go, Dan's father, in a brutal fight that resulted in the loss of Sagat's right eye. After Sagat pretended that he was defeated, Dan opened an unsuccessful school for his fighting style, Saikyo-ryu ("Strongest style"). He has appeared in several sequels as well as crossovers games Capcom had with other franchices.

Dan Hibiki was created to parody Ryo Sakazaki and Robert Garcia, the two lead characters of SNK's Art of Fighting series. While his existence was foreshadowed in promotional artwork of Street Fighter II, it was not until the Alpha trilogy that he was properly introduced. Since then, Dan has become a fan favorite due to his humorous design, signature moves and mannerisms. He has often been praised for being a weak character that players aim to become expert at while his role in the story was praised due to the multiple references to Art of Fighting. However, the idea of Dan being a weak character also received negative response.

== Appearances ==
Dan is introduced in Street Fighter Alpha and Street Fighter Alpha 2 as a martial artist who developed his own fighting style called Saikyō-ryū, "The Strongest Style", despite the considerable lack of power in his techniques. During these two games, Dan seeks to defeat Sagat to avenge his father's death. While Dan is an unlockable character in Street Fighter Alpha, in following games he is already available. By Street Fighter Alpha 3, Dan has succeeded in his quest (as Sagat, having realized through Dan how far gone a person can be for revenge, purposefully threw the fight) and seeks to perfect and promote his fighting style. In this game, he also declares himself the mentor of the fighter Sakura Kasugano and is revealed to be one of Blanka's friends.

Dan also appears in the console versions of Street Fighter IV, entering the tournament in an effort to make his Saikyo-style more popular. He also appears as Sakura's mentor and fights her as a rival in the penultimate fight of his Arcade mode. In Super Street Fighter IV, he continues fighting to promote and gain membership into his Saikyo Dojo which has no members at all. However, his plan fails due to lack of publicity used for his dojo, he didn't pay his phone bills and when he made his commercial to promote his dojo, he forgot to put the address to his dojo. Dan is used as the "dummy" opponent for the Challenge Mode in the home versions.

Prior to being released as a playable character for the fifth season of downloadable content in Street Fighter V, he provides descriptions of items that players can purchase from the in-game store, occasionally breaking the fourth wall. In the game's story, Dan may have won in a certain world martial arts tournament legally off-screen, but is still dissatisfied about still lacking of students in his dojo. However, thanks to Sakura and Blanka's tips, Dan is inspired by the success of the latter's "Blanka-chan" dolls and attempts to become popular by creating his own variation called "Saikyo-boy" dolls.

His stance as a "weak" character is emphasized in the puzzle game Super Puzzle Fighter II Turbo, in which Dan is a hidden character who drops only red counter gems, making him extremely easy to beat. In Super Gem Fighter Mini Mix, Dan's story begins with himself looking to expand his Saikyo-ryu school and subsequently chooses Sakura as his student. Upon meeting Sakura, he offers to teach her his style and she accepts after Dan defeats her in a fight. Sakura masters the entire Saikyo-ryu style and chooses to forget the entire style three days after mastering it, humiliating Dan.

Dan appears as a playable character in some Capcom crossover projects, including two crossovers with Marvel: Marvel Super Heroes vs. Street Fighter and Marvel vs. Capcom 2 as well as the crossovers with SNK starting with Capcom vs. SNK Pro. During the debut trailer for the crossover fighting game Street Fighter X Tekken, Dan is beaten through a door following an encounter with Tekken character Kazuya Mishima. Even then, Dan does make a non-playable appearance as the "dummy" in the game's training mode. He is also seen in Sakura and Blanka's ending, trapped inside of Pandora. Dan makes a cameo in Sentinel's Marvel vs. Capcom 3 ending, being beaten and dragged by one of the giant robots. In Street Fighter X Mega Man, Dan appears in between stages as Mega Man tests his new weapons on him. Dan is also shown to have a younger sister, Yuriko, who appears in his Marvel Super Heroes vs. Street Fighter ending and as the in-game shopkeeper in Street Fighter V.

=== In other media ===
Additionally, Dan has had a small appearance in the original video animation Street Fighter Alpha: The Animation.

In the manga Street Fighter: Sakura Ganbaru!, Dan is featured as a supporting character, where he is shown to be knowledgeable on how Ki is channeled through a person's body, acts as a guide for Sakura's first few fights and is competent enough to take on small-time fighters, but hopelessly outclassed with more skillful challengers such as Balrog. Dan is also featured in UDON's Street Fighter series, where he views Sakura as a rival, though he is usually defeated without much effort on her part. A few issues have revealed that if angered enough he can tap into the Satsui no Hado, but still is not as intimidating as he trips over Sakura's backpack when he tries to use the Raging Demon. By the time of Super Street Fighter: New Generation (which adapts the events of Street Fighter III), Dan is shown to have lost his dojo and now works as a chef for E. Honda. He assists Guile and Alex in rescuing Ryu and curing Sakura of the Satsui no Hado. In Street Fighter Unlimited, Dan finally faces off against Sagat to avenge his father. Though Sagat dominates him throughout the fight, he gives up out of guilt and gives Dan the opportunity to finish him off, but Dan ultimately refuses to kill him as he realizes his father would not have wanted this.

Dan' s name is mentioned in Street Fighter: Assassin's Fist as a former student taught by Gouken before Ryu and Ken. In a deleted scene, Gouken tells Ryu and Ken how he taught Dan in his early days as a sensei but sent him away due to wanting to use his training for revenge.

Dan appears in the 2026 live-action film, portrayed by Andrew Schulz. In the film, Dan serves as comic relief and is depicted as Ken's manager and longtime friend, having trained alongside him and Ryu under Gouken. Despite his limited fighting abilities, he assists Ken in confronting Akuma and Ryu after the latter transforms into Dark Ryu. He later joins Ken, Ryu and Chun-Li in their mission to stop M. Bison. Upon its announcement, Schulz's casting was criticized as whitewashing due to the character's Japanese heritage in the games. The film addresses this when Guile accuses Dan of "pretending to be Asian", to which Dan responds by claiming to be "1/18th Honshu".

== Concept and creation ==
Shortly after the release of Street Fighter II, rival company SNK released their own fighting game, Art of Fighting. The principal character of this series, Ryo Sakazaki, bore a resemblance in appearance and name to Ryu, as well as other aesthetic similarities to Ken, wearing an orange gi and sporting blonde hair.

In humorous retaliation, Street Fighter II co-designer Akiman drew an artwork of Sagat holding a defeated opponent by the head during the release of Street Fighter II: Champion Edition. The defeated opponent wore an attire similar to Ryo's: an orange karate gi with a torn black shirt underneath and geta sandals; but had long dark hair tied to a ponytail like Robert Garcia, another character from the Art of Fighting series. This character design would become the basis of Dan, who was introduced as a secret character in Street Fighter Alpha until finally becoming a selectable character by default in the game's sequel, Street Fighter Alpha 2. His fireball is telling: instead of using both hands to unleash his Gadōken, as Ryu and Ken do for the Hadōken, he propels it with one hand, like Ryo, Robert and Yuri do for the Kooh-ken (though Dan's Gadōken has pitifully short range and does mediocre damage; it only gains longer range when the player uses the super version of the move, the Shinkū Gadōken). Dan can also taunt infinitely like the Art of Fighting games, unlike his fellow Street Fighter Alpha characters who can only taunt once per round in the Alpha series.

When developing Street Fighter IV, executive producer Yoshinori Ono emphasized Dan as a character he strongly wanted to have appear in the game. Ono stated that, while the character's personality and actions earned him the label of a joke character, he felt Dan was a very technical fighting game character that could be used well and bring something unique to the game. In a later interview, he emphasized his desire to have Dan in the game again, citing the then-unveiled inclusion of Sakura Kasugano in home versions as added incentive.

Dan has a similar outfit to Ryu and Ken, wearing a traditional karate gi. Dan also wears a black undershirt like Ryo. His head and face closely resemble Robert (especially the ponytail hairstyle) except with comical features like pointed up "angry" eyebrows and a noticeable cleft chin, while his outfit is bright pink, reminiscent of Ryo's orange outfit in Art of Fighting. In Street Fighter IV, the pink of his gi is faded in places, suggesting it was originally white, but turned pink after being mixed in with red-colored laundry. In Street Fighter IV, he can be seen with the kanji 最強流 (Saikyō-ryū) on his lapel. During some moves, the kanji 父 (father) or 弾 (bullet, pronounced 'Dan') appears on his back, similar to Akuma.

== Reception ==
Dan's character has received mostly positive reception from video game publications with IGN his role as a "fan favorite" despite his status as a joke character. GameDaily regarded him as a "bizarre" fighting game character, calling him "fun" despite his handicaps. When it came to Dan's gameplay, the site additionally ranked Dan's "Shisso Buraiken" from Street Fighter IV as one of "gaming's most satisfying uppercuts" positively comparing to Ryu's Shoryuken despite being notably weaker. In "You Must Defeat Shen Long To Stand a Chance": Street Fighter, Race, Play and Player, Nicholas Ware says that Dan Hibiki's comical characterization is used to "defang" the character of Blanka in the Alpha games, turning the Brazilian fighter into Dan's "furry sidekick". In The Fundamentals of Video Game Literacy: Theory, Practice, and Aesthetics Ryu and Ken are regarded as the early "shoto" stereotype of video game characters whose movesets are imitated by other series. However, Dan comes across as an exception as rather than imitating Ryu and Ken's moves, his style is far more comical and ineffective as a result of Capcom intentionally creating him to make fun of the Art of Fighting protagonists who are very similar to the Street Fighter leads.

Despite acknowledging the parody intent behind Dan Hibiki's character, Tiago Oviedo Frosi wrote that Dan's karate gi is a proper type of gi despite the pink color with all of Capcom and SNK characters bearing the same "Shoto" style of design seem to be based on Kyokushinkaikan created by Mas Oyama.

The idea of Dan being a subject also appealed to Mikel Reparaz of GamesRadar as Dan became becoming a fan favorite of "overconfident players who want to show their skills." In "The pathetic history of Dan Hibiki", Reparaz compared his popularity with Rodney Dangerfield and called him "a crappy version of Ryu or Ken" who was nonetheless one of the most enjoyable playable characters in the series. He claimed the character is notorious his weak special moves. They noted Dan's "douchebag" personality was taken from Robert Garcia from Art of Fighting while his outfit was inspired by Ryo Sakazaki from the same game as an insult towards game company SNK for making similar fighters. The character stood out in the Street Fighter Alpha trilogy for having notable rivalry with Sagat rather than just being a parody. Though Dan would remain as a joke character, Reparaz praised how Capcom portrayed him in Marvel Super Heroes vs Street Fighter where he parodies Akuma's Raging Demon special move and still keeps making fun of the Art of Fighting narrative if he manages to defeat Akuma's alterego, Cyber Akuma. For the crossovers between Capcom and SNK, Paradaz noted that Dan was initially portrayed as a more serious character who wanted to teach Ryo Sakazaki whereas in Cacpom vs. SNK he remains as a joke rival of Fatal Fury character Joe Higashi who is also portrayed as a joke. His parody role was further expanded in SVC Chaos.

UGO Networks meanwhile came to regards best Street Fighter characters, commenting that players could use him to "insult or embarrass a competing player." Series producer Yoshinori Ono jokingly announced at the 2011 Comic Con that Dan's absence from Street Fighter X Tekken was due to a Tekken character having "killed" him in a newly released trailer for the game. Jordan Mallory of Joystiq published a mock eulogy of Dan in response. The boss character Chuck from Gogetsuji Legends (1995) was designed as a parody of Dan; Kurt Kalata of Hardcore Gaming 101 said, "In other words, a copy of a copy." 4thletter.net rated Dan's Super Gem Fighter Mini Mix ending, in which Sakura quits his dojo after only a couple days and calls him "worthless" as an entertaining ending due to the handling of Dan's character.

Dan also received negative response with Ryan Clements of IGN calling him Dan the "most embarrassing character" on the Street Fighter IV roster as while longtime fans know him since Alpha newcomers would be bothered by his inclusion. Despite admitting the story of the character is fun, his entire inclusion in the sequel is bad because all of his moves are poor parodies of Ryu and Ken's special moves that require a lot of skills to beat the game as him. Kotaku's Brian Ashcraft also criticized his English voiceover in the game. Smosh also criticized Dan, as players who select the "joke character" might also come across as jokes. Nevertheless, his inclusion in Street Fighter V was praised by TheGamer for retaining his underpowered "shoto" skills as well as the inclusion of taunts that can be used alongside combos.

Club Nintendo said of all the Street Fighter characters, perhaps the one with the most special story is Dan as his creation goes beyond a hateful fighter. The writer noted the similarities between Street Fighter and Art of Fighting, the latter featuring Ryo Sakazaki and Robert Garcia; both used a fighting style similar to Ryu and Ken from Capcom's series. Dan is more than just a character as he represents much of the rivalry between the two companies. Dan's first appearance was on a poster, held by the head by Sagat. The entire scene seemed like an attempt to mock Ryo Sakazaki but with the face of Robert Garcia, a clear parody of the rival franchise. His movements were identical to those of his SNK counterparts and his outfit felt like a parody to Ryo's.

Dan's portrayal in the 2026 film received mixed reviews, with critics divided over Andrew Schulz's comedic performance and the character's expanded role in the story. Brad Gilmore of the Houston Press praised Schulz as one of the film's strongest performers, highlighting his comedic timing despite initially questioning his casting. Travis Hopson of Punch Drunk Critics similarly praised Schulz for making Dan, whom he regarded as one of the franchise's weakest characters, entertaining and likable. Eric Francisco of Esquire described Dan as an unexpectedly important emotional presence in the film, despite his origins as a joke character in the games. Conversely, Jacob Oller of The A.V. Club criticized the amount of screen time devoted to Schulz, arguing that Dan's prominence detracted from the film's other characters. Heath Andrews of Nerdbot offered a more qualified assessment, praising Schulz as a genuinely funny presence while observing that Dan came close to becoming overbearing.
