= Fatal Fury: King of Fighters =

1991 video game

- Arcade flyer
- Developer: SNK (Note: SNES version developed by Takara; Mega Drive/Genesis version developed by Gaibrain and Aspect; X68000 version developed by Magical Company.)
- Publishers: SNK: Super NES Takara Mega Drive/Genesis; NA: Takara; JP/EU: Sega X68000 Magical Company
- Director: Takashi Nishiyama
- Producer: Eikichi Kawasaki
- Designers: Seigo Ito; Takashi Tsukamoto
- Composers: Hiroshi Matsumoto; Kazuhiro Nishida; Toshikazu Tanaka
- Series: Fatal Fury
- Platforms: Arcade, Neo Geo AES, Super NES, Mega Drive/Genesis, X68000, Neo Geo CD
- Release: November 25, 1991: Arcade; WW: November 25, 1991 Neo Geo AES; WW: December 20, 1991 Super NES; JP: November 27, 1992; NA: April 1993; EU: 1993 Mega Drive/Genesis; NA: February 1993; JP: April 23, 1993; EU: April 1993 X68000; JP: July 23, 1993 Neo Geo CD; JP: September 9, 1994; NA: October 1996
- Genre: Fighting
- Modes: Single-player, multiplayer
- Arcade system: Neo Geo MVS

Fatal Fury: King of Fighters (Note: Known in Japan as Garō Densetsu: Shukumei no Tatakai (餓狼伝説 ～宿命の闘い～, Garō Densetsu: Shukumei no Tatakai; lit. Hungry Wolf Legend: The Battle of Destiny)) is a 1991 fighting game developed and published by SNK for the Neo Geo arcade. It was later ported to numerous home consoles, including the Super Nintendo Entertainment System in 1992 and Sega Genesis in 1993. Fatal Fury was SNK's first fighting game for the Neo Geo system, and served as the first entry in their Fatal Fury series. The three playable characters are the Bogard brothers Terry and Andy alongside their friend Joe Higashi. In the story they oppose their nemesis Geese Howard, the host of "The King of Fighters" tournament where the player must use martial arts to defeat enemies until becoming the champion and reaching Geese.

The game was designed by former Capcom employee Takashi Nishiyama, the designer of the original Street Fighter (1987). Fatal Fury placed more emphasis on the timing of special moves as well as storytelling. The character of Terry Bogard was originally going to be used in Street Fighter but was scrapped in favor of the SNK project. Nishiyama personally developed the game as his own response to Street Fighter II (1991). The two final bosses Geese and Billy Kane were influenced by the film The Godfather.

Fatal Fury inspired multiple sequels published by SNK following its success. There have also been several original video animations (OVA) and manga adaptation based on the story. Its IP and Art of Fighting share the same continuity by placing a younger Geese in the second installment, Art of Fighting 2, whereas Art of Fighting lead Ryo Sakazaki would return in the remake Fatal Fury: Wild Ambition. Both Fatal Fury and Art of Fighting became the basis for the later The King of Fighters games by SNK where Terry, Ryo and other SNK protagonists fight alongside other crossover characters created by SNK in new tournaments. Critical response to Fatal Fury was positive, drawing positive comparison to Street Fighter II based on special moves and visuals.

== Gameplay ==
Gameplay screenshot showcasing a match with Terry Bogard performing his signature "Power Wave" move against Richard Myer

The gameplay follows the typical formula of most fighting games: the player competes against their opponent in best two-out-of-three matches. The play controls consist of an eight directional joystick and three attack buttons: punch, kick and throw. Each of the playable characters has special techniques that are performed by inputting specific commands in combination with the joystick and buttons. The input methods for special moves are shown to the player during the course of the game (after every bonus round), as opposed to being given in an instruction card in the game's cabinet.

The most novel aspect of Fatal Fury was the addition of two-lane battles. Many stages featured two rows, a background row, and a foreground row. Players can change between rows at any time other than in the Single Player Mode, where they have to wait for the CPU opponent to change rows before they can in almost every stage. The player is not required, however, to do so. When a second player joins during the middle of a one-player fight, instead of postponing the current battle for a match between the two players, the game will make both players team up against the current CPU opponent in a two-on-one match before their battle takes place. After every other match in the single-player tournament, the player will participate in a bonus round mini-game involving an arm wrestling match against a machine. The player must tap the A button rapidly to win these mini-games.

== Plot ==
Terry and Andy were unrelated orphans who raised themselves on the streets of South Town. They were soon adopted by Jeff Bogard, a master martial artist. A few years after being adopted by Jeff, both Terry and Andy witnessed the brutal murder of their adoptive father at the hands of Geese Howard: a ruthless businessman and expert martial artist who rules South Town's criminal underworld as a merciless crime boss. Geese, who was once Jeff's rival, had murdered Jeff when the latter had tried to expose Geese's criminal activities to the public. Knowing that they weren't strong enough and needed more training to confront Geese, the brothers made an oath to spend a decade to fine tune their martial arts before trying to avenge their adoptive father. Terry chose to wander in his home country, combining his self-taught street fighting techniques with the Hakkyokuseiken fighting skills he learned from both his adoptive father and his mentor, Tung Fu Rue who is the shih-fu of both the art of Hakkyokuseiken and the art of Bajiquan. Andy decided to perfect his own martial arts style in Japan to differentiate himself from his older brother by being taught the Shiranui-ryū Ninjutsu (Shiranui Style Ninja Technique) and a form of empty-handed combat called Koppōken.

A decade later in 1991, Geese Howard has organized a fighting tournament, dubbed "The King of Fighters". Terry reunites with Andy after the latter returns to South Town from Japan. After the Bogard brothers pay respects to Jeff's grave, they encounter and befriend a Japanese Muay Thai champion named Joe Higashi from Thailand and learn about the KOF tournament hosted by Geese. Determined to avenge their adoptive father's death, Terry and Andy enter KOF alongside Joe and fight against many competitors, including Tung Fu Rue who had wanted to test the brothers out in making sure they were ready for their potential battle against Geese. Despite their best effort, both Andy and Joe were badly injured after defeating two of Geese's fighters, Raiden and Hwa Jai respectively, leaving Terry to continue on alone and facing off against Geese's right-hand man Billy Kane within the final match of the tournament. Although Terry succeeds in defeating Billy and winning the tournament, he is suddenly captured by two of Geese's henchmen and sent to Geese's personal tower by force, leading to a one-on-one showdown against the crime boss himself. Geese is a formidable opponent for Terry, but the latter gains the upper hand during their battle and defeats the former with a powerful jump kick, causing Geese to fall from his tower and plummet to his death. As Terry, who had finally avenged his adoptive father's death, leaves the tournament victorious, Andy feels a mixed sense of closure and returns to Japan to continue his martial arts training, while Joe, who has said his goodbyes to the brothers after the tournament's conclusion, travels back to Thailand in order to continue his Muay Thai training.

== Characters ==
At the beginning of the game, the player is given the option to select one fighter which is either Terry, Andy, or Joe. The player is then given the next option to select from one of four fighters as their first opponent: Duck King, Richard Meyer, Michael Max, and Tung Fu Rue. After defeating their first opponent, the player faces the other three opponents in the following order: Richard, Michael, Duck, Tung. The cycle begins at whichever opponent the player has selected. The three bosses before the final boss Geese Howard are fought in the following order: Hwa Jai, Raiden and Billy Kane.

Competitors

- Terry Bogard - an American martial arts expert seeking to avenge his father's death.
- Andy Bogard - Terry's younger brother, who learned Koppōjutsu in Japan.
- Joe Higashi - a Japanese Muay Thai master and a friend to the Bogard brothers.

Challengers

- Duck King - a street dancing talent who uses a "rhythmical" fighting style.
- Richard Meyer - a capoeira master with numerous kick techniques.
- Michael Max - a Catholic boxer who has a projectile attack called the Tornado Upper.
- Tung Fu Rue - a meek, elderly Bajiquan master. After taking enough damage, he transforms into a musclebound version of himself for a set amount of time before reverting.

Bosses

- Hwa Jai - a Muay Thai master from Thailand who gains his strength from drinking an unknown liquor. His special technique is a flying knee kick called the Dragon Kick (มังกรเตะ, Mạngkr Tea), similar to Joe's Tiger Kick.
- Raiden - a heel professional wrestler, known for ruthlessly manhandling his opponents in the ring. After moving to South Town in search of stronger fighters to face, he was hired as one of Geese Howard's henchmen. His special move is the Vapor Breath.
- Billy Kane - a Bōjutsu master who serves as the tournament's undefeated champion. In his signature move, he throws his staff in front of his opponent, then cowers in a defensive position until Geese's bodyguard Ripper tosses Kane a spare.

Final boss

- Geese Howard - the final boss of the game. An underworld crime boss and the sponsor of the "King of Fighters" tournament. After defeating Billy, the player's character is kidnapped by Geese's men and taken to his building, Geese Tower, for the game's final battle. His fighting style is aikido and has a projectile attack similar to Terry's Power Wave called the Reppuken (烈風拳 / れっぷうけん; lit. "Gale Fist"). He can also slam his opponent after blocking a close-range attack, this technique is called the Atemi Nage (当身投 / あて身なげ; lit. "Hit Throw"). When the player loses to Geese, instead of the standard continue screen, they witness their character falling off from Geese Tower. However, if the player wins, their character will knock off Geese from his building, seemingly killing him.

== Development ==
Early draft of the Fatal Fury characters

Fatal Fury: King of Fighters was designed by Takashi Nishiyama, the creator of the original Street Fighter (1987) at Capcom. After leaving Capcom for SNK, Nishiyama wanted to create a fighting game with a storyline and characters that were easier to empathize with, something he wasn’t able to achieve with Street Fighter. Fatal Fury, which Nishiyama envisioned as a spiritual successor to Street Fighter, was developed around the same time as Street Fighter II (1991). While Street Fighter II placed more emphasis on combos, Fatal Fury placed more emphasis on the timing of special moves as well as storytelling, which are two features that he failed on during the original Street Fighter. Developed at the same time as Capcom's own Street Fighter sequel, Nishiyama referred to Fatal Fury as "my Street Fighter II."

The sound team had between four and five months to develop the audio. The voice acting was done by the staff themselves which was disapproved by higher ups resulting in next installments having professional voice actors. Veteran developer Yasuyuki Oda believes the detailed facial expressions and 2D backgrounds were the secret behind Fatal Fury's fame. Oda also believes the fact that the cast does not look like actual fighters left a major impact. Nishiyama originally created Terry for Street Fighter as a Caucasian man wearing a leather jacket; they decided to make the main playable character a dougi-clad karateka named Ryu instead. They still wanted to use this concept in a game; after their move to SNK, they implemented him as a playable character in Fatal Fury. Terry's original appearance was made with the intention that he did not look like a martial artist, contrasting the looks of his brother Andy. In the making of the series, Terry and his brother Andy were characterized as the heroic leads, contrasting with the comical Joe Higashi. The SNK staff described his original design as "the most macho, stand-out, original Terry". A sumo wrestler was meant to be part of the roster but was removed by Michael Max. SNK avoided Fatal Fury to be too similar to Street Fighter II. Andy originally wore black costumes and had short hair. A character model named Tau To would serve as the basis for Hwa Jai. Duck King, meanwhile, was originally known as Ellie Jones with the designer having several troubles with him. However, the main designer had no problems with Geese as he enjoyed his Japanese-loving characterization. Tung Fu was originally going to appear younger than in the finished product.

Youchiro Soeda was in charge of the animation of most of the characters in the game. Although Geese was not modeled after any famous person or fictional character, SNK based him on Italian mafia. SNK had multiple doubts how his design should be until it was decided he would wear a gi based on martial arts, as well as his overall name, likeness, and appearance being references to the three boss characters Black Gallop, Geese, and King from SNK's previous Neo Geo game The Super Spy (1990). Despite being American, SNK wanted him to be a man inspired by Japanese culture resulting in his final look. Geese became famous for his special moves which allows him to interrupt the player's attacks and counterattack in a grab. Sub-boss Billy Kane obtained similar fame with both Geese and him having The Godfather-like influences that were expanded on in later games.

=== Console versions ===
The Super NES version of Fatal Fury, developed and published by Takara, was released in Japan in 1992 and in North America the following year. This version discards the two-lane system in favor of a more conventional one-lane plane. The two-on-one battles are gone and the arm wrestling bonus rounds are replaced by new bonus rounds involving the main character punching flying tires. In the game's Versus Mode, all of the CPU-controlled characters are playable, albeit only on the second player's side. Players can also pick the same main character (in an alternate color).

The Mega Drive/Genesis version was released in 1993, published by Sega in Japan and Europe, and by Takara in North America. This version removes the characters of Hwa Jai and Billy Kane from the roster, relegating them to background cameos. Instead, the player faces against the other two main characters during the course of the single-player mode. This version allows both players to play as the CPU-controlled characters in the game's Versus Mode. An X68000 version produced by Mahou Kabushikigaisha (Magical Company) was released in Japan only on May 21, 1993.

An emulation of the original Neo Geo game is included along with its sequels Fatal Fury 2, Fatal Fury Special and Fatal Fury 3, in the compilation Fatal Fury: Battle Archives Vol. 1 for the PlayStation 2. This version includes an option for the original arcade soundtrack or an arranged soundtrack composed specifically for the compilation. The Neo Geo version of Fatal Fury has been released by D4 Enterprise as part of the Virtual Console downloadable lineup for the Wii. The original Fatal Fury is also included in SNK Arcade Classics Vol. 1, released for the PlayStation 2, PlayStation Portable, and Wii. The Neo Geo version was available on PlayStation Network as part of SNK's Neo Geo Station lineup. Hamster Corporation re-released the game as part of their ACA Neo Geo series for the PlayStation 4, Xbox One, Nintendo Switch, Windows, Android and iOS.

== Reception ==
Reception

Review scores
Publication	Score
Computer and Video Games	(NG) 94% (SMD) 85%
Electronic Gaming Monthly	(GEN) 4/10, 5/10, 4/10, 3/10
GameFan	(GEN) 348/400
GamePro	(NG) 5/5
Maximum	(NG) 2/5

=== Commercial ===
In Japan, Game Machine listed Fatal Fury: King of Fighters as the third most successful table arcade unit of December 1991. It went on to be Japan's fourth highest-grossing arcade game of 1992, below Street Fighter II (two versions) and Captain Commando. In North America, RePlay reported Fatal Fury to be the second most popular arcade game of February 1992.

=== Critical ===
Paul Rand of Computer and Video Games called Fatal Fury one of the best Neo Geo games available in 1992, and compared it favorably to Street Fighter II, stating Fatal Fury was a "brilliant feast of fighting" with "huge and excellently drawn" character sprites, great animation, and unique special attacks "giving the game more variety."

In a retrospective review, Maximum commented in 1996 that the game failed to offer any real competition for Street Fighter II in terms of either playability or character selection. They concluded, "The only main point in this game's favor is that two of the characters may team together to take on a computer opponent in a three-player frenzy, and the game also tries to offer something else new with a two-tier playing arena, but the slow action and the disgracefully difficult fireball motions make special moves something of a rare occurrence." In 2018, Complex ranked the game 74th on its list of "The Best Super Nintendo Games of All Time". They praised the combat and the ability to jump in and out of the backgrounds, and called the game "one of the best fighters on the SNES, by far."

GameSpot reviewer Frank Provo comments that Geese's introduction in Fatal Fury is one of the biggest accomplishments from the game as he notes how Geese continues appearing in other games. Avi Krebs from Gamingexcellence.com noted that Geese was the hardest character of the series to defeat and jokingly commented that even though he fights "while wearing a wristwatch, he pulls out all the tricks possible". IGN writer Ryan Clements agreed with Avi Krebs, saying that Geese is "almost physically impossible to beat". He also mentioned that due to how difficult Geese is, almost twelve different IGN people had to help Clements to win, being only able to defeat him "resorting to the cheapest, most absurd tactics possible". Eric Bratcher from GamesRadar commented that Geese is "the big hook" from the series along with Terry Bogard, labelling Geese as "nearly un-killable".

== Legacy ==
The Fatal Fury series inspired a trilogy of animated productions produced by NAS with SNK, featuring character designs by Masami Ōbari. The first is a television special that aired in 1992 on Fuji TV titled Fatal Fury: Legend of the Hungry Wolf (Battle Fighters Garou Densetsu), which adapts the plot of the first game. It was followed in 1993 by another television special Fatal Fury 2: The New Battle (Battle Fighters Garou Densetsu 2) based on the second game, which also aired on Fuji TV. A theatrically released film followed in 1994, titled Fatal Fury: The Motion Picture (Garou Densetsu: The Motion Picture), which features an original plot and new characters. The first two TV specials were released on a single laserdisc and later on DVD. The character's popularity in Fatal Fury and his younger look from the first original video animation influenced his appearance in Art of Fighting 2 as a hidden boss.

Many soundtracks, manga comics, other books, video tapes, and drama CDs have been released in Japan for the series as a whole and for each of its individual entries. A brief OVA set after the events of Mark of the Wolves, titled Memories of Stray Wolves, was packaged with the 15th anniversary soundtrack collection. The events of the first game were also loosely adapted in the web series The King of Fighters: Destiny.
