= SNK vs. Capcom =

Video game series

- Genres: Collectible card game Fighting
- Developers: Capcom Production Studio 1 Dimps; SNK
- Publishers: Capcom; SNK; SNK Playmore
- Platforms: Arcade, Dreamcast, Windows, Neo-Geo, Neo Geo Pocket Color, Nintendo DS, GameCube, Switch, PlayStation, PlayStation 2, PlayStation 3, PlayStation 4, Xbox
- First release: SNK vs. Capcom: Card Fighters' Clash; October 21, 1999
- Latest release: SNK vs. Capcom: SVC Chaos (2024 re-release); July 20, 2024
- Spin-offs: SNK vs. Capcom: Card Fighters

SNK vs. Capcom, or alternately Capcom vs. SNK, is a series of crossover video games by either Capcom or SNK featuring characters that appear in games created by either company. Most of these are fighting games, and take on a similar format to Capcom's own Marvel vs. Capcom series, in which the players create teams of fighters and have them fight each other. Games in this series either contain SNK vs. Capcom or Capcom vs. SNK in their titles, with the first company named denoting the company behind the game's development.

Reception to the series has been varied; while the Capcom-developed titles were the most positively-received (and are still widely well regarded by critics), the SNK-developed installments received more mixed reviews by the time of its releases, although these have been the subject of reappraisal as time went on, now being considered cult classics by players and critics alike.

== History ==
Release timeline
| 1999 | SNK vs. Capcom: Card Fighters' Clash |
| 1999 | SNK vs. Capcom: The Match of the Millennium |
| 2000 | Capcom vs. SNK: Millennium Fight 2000 |
| 2001 | Capcom vs. SNK 2: Mark of the Millennium 2001 |
| 2001 | SNK vs. Capcom: Card Fighters 2 Expand Edition |
2002
| 2003 | SNK vs. Capcom: SVC Chaos |
2004
2005
| 2006 | SNK vs. Capcom: Card Fighters DS |

The supposed origin behind this series was an issue of Arcadia magazine in which there were articles covering both The King of Fighters '98 and Street Fighter Alpha 3, both of which were released at around the same time. Readers had misread the cover, which said KOF vs. SF, to mean that there was a fighting game that would pit characters from Street Fighter and The King of Fighters. Because of this uproar, Capcom and SNK supposedly signed a deal that would allow them to produce only two fighting games concerning both franchises in 1999 (the Card Fighters series (see below) were not fighting games and therefore were exempt from the rule). It is highly suggested that SNK vs. Capcom: SVC Chaos was only made in order to fulfill the contract obligations that SNK made prior to the company filing bankruptcy and their eventual closing in 2000. Also, if one company was the main creator of one game, the distributing company would gain the profits and not the company that licensed the characters for use (although SNK gave the rights to use the SNK characters to Capcom for the first Capcom vs. SNK game, SNK did not profit from the game, which did not help their financial problems).

=== Series hiatus ===
In a 2021 interview with Polygon, director Hideaki Itsuno confirmed that at one point, there had been plans for a new, 3D installment in the series, but that it had been cancelled due to SNK's bankruptcy. The 3D assets created for Capcom vs. SNK 3 were later repurposed for the cancelled Capcom Fighting All-Stars; said project was set to include The King of Fighters character K' as a guest character during its planned release after a deal was struck with the then-reformed SNK Playmore. There were interviews with SNK that it would be possible to renew their contract with Capcom to make new SNK vs. Capcom games, but in another interview, both companies stated that they would not do any further collaboration with each other, claiming SNK vs. Capcom: Card Fighters DS would probably be the last crossover game between both companies. However, in an interview from January 2009, Yoshinori Ono, the producer of Street Fighter IV, expressed interest in a possible third game if fans demanded it.

While no new SNK vs. Capcom titles have been released since Card Fighters DS, characters from both companies have appeared together in a handful of titles by other developers, including Bandai Namco's Tekken 7, Nintendo's Super Smash Bros. Ultimate, and Cygames' Granblue Fantasy.

==== Crossover appearances and re-releases ====
SNK vs. Capcom: Match of the Millennium and SNK vs. Capcom: Card Fighters' Clash were re-released for the first time in 2021 and 2022 respectively on Windows and Nintendo Switch; both games are included in the Neo Geo Pocket Color Selection compilation series. In March 2022, Street Fighter characters were added to Netmarble and SNK's The King of Fighters All Star. In August 2022, SNK and Capcom artists Eisuke Ogura and Shinkiro — the latter of whom is currently at Capcom after famously working at SNK — created special promotional posters featuring both companies' characters to celebrate the 2022 Evolution Championship Series tournament, the first live EVO since the COVID-19 pandemic. In a subsequent interview, SNK producer Yasuyuki Oda stated that "both parties" were interested in a potential revival of the series. Oda stated in a later interview that the EVO artwork opened the doors for further collaboration between the two companies.

Multiple crossovers between SNK and Capcom were announced throughout 2024. At Summer Game Fest in June, both Terry Bogard and Mai Shiranui were revealed as part of Street Fighter 6's second season of downloadable content, making them the first third-party guest characters in a mainline Street Fighter game. The next month, during EVO 2024, a re-release of SNK vs. Capcom: SVC Chaos for Windows, Nintendo Switch and PlayStation 4 was announced and released that day. The following August, it was announced that the Capcom-developed titles in the series would be included in Capcom Fighting Collection 2. During Tokyo Game Show in September, it was announced that Ken Masters and Chun-Li would be part of the first season of DLC for Fatal Fury: City of the Wolves, similarly making them the first third-party guest characters in a Fatal Fury game. These announcements sparked speculation about a potential revival of the series, an interest acknowledged by Capcom producer Shuhei Matsumoto in an interview. In another interview, Oda stated that while there were certain hurdles in the way, they were aware of the fan demand and the odds of a revival were not impossible.

== SNK-produced games ==
- SNK vs. Capcom: The Match of the Millennium – A portable fighting game developed by Dimps and released for the Neo Geo Pocket Color. The game features three different playing rules to choose from (Single Battle, Tag Match, and Team Battle). The game also features an "Olympic Mode" with themed minigames based on both SNK and Capcom classic games. It was later re-released on Steam and for Nintendo Switch, both as an individual game and as part of Neo Geo Pocket Color Selection Vol. 1.
- SNK vs. Capcom: Card Fighters' Clash – Also released for the Neo Geo Pocket Color, a digital collectible card game featuring trading card based on SNK's and Capcom's properties. Two versions were produced; the SNK Supporter's Version and the Capcom Supporter's Version.
- SNK vs. Capcom: Card Fighters 2 Expand Edition – The sequel to Card Fighters' Clash, released on the Neo Geo Pocket Color in Japan and Asia only. Includes cards based on Capcom vs. SNK 2.
- SNK vs. Capcom: SVC Chaos – Released for the Neo Geo (both arcade and home versions) and ported to the PlayStation 2 and Xbox. A one-on-one fighting game featuring 36 characters. The game was later re-released for PC on the Steam and GOG digital stores, as well for PlayStation 4 and Nintendo Switch.
- SNK vs. Capcom: Card Fighters DS – A Card Fighters' Clash sequel released for the Nintendo DS.

== Capcom-produced games ==
- Capcom vs. SNK: Millennium Fight 2000 – Released for Sega's NAOMI arcade hardware in 2000 and ported to the Dreamcast during the same year, the original Capcom vs. SNK features 28 characters (evenly divided between Capcom and SNK properties), two selectable fighting styles or "grooves" (based on the gameplay systems featured in The King of Fighters and Street Fighter Alpha series) and a ratio-based character selection system that determines the number of characters in a player's team based on their strength.
  - An updated version titled Capcom vs. SNK Pro, released for the arcades and Dreamcast in Japan in 2001 and ported to the PlayStation worldwide in 2002, which adds Dan Hibiki and Joe Higashi to the character roster. The Dreamcast version of the game also discards the shop option to earn extra characters and colors, having all of them available by default. This version is included in Capcom Fighting Collection 2, which was released on Steam, Nintendo Switch, PlayStation 4 and Xbox One in May 2025.
- Capcom vs. SNK 2: Mark of the Millennium 2001 – Titled Capcom vs. SNK 2: Millionaire Fighting 2001 in Japan. Released for the NAOMI hardware in 2001 and ported to the Dreamcast (in Japan only) and PlayStation 2 during the same year. The game expands on the "Groove" system from the previous game by featuring six different fighting styles or "Grooves" and adds twelve new characters in addition to the ones featured in Capcom vs. SNK Pro. The PlayStation 2 version was later re-released as a PS2 Classics port for PlayStation 3. The arcade version is included on Capcom Fighting Collection 2.
  - A version for GameCube and Xbox was released under the title of Capcom vs. SNK 2 EO. According to the Japanese official website for the GameCube version, EO stands for Easy Operation, because of a new feature that allows the player to assign special techniques to the right analog stick (C Stick for the GameCube version). This version is included in Capcom Fighting Collection 2.

== Characters ==
List of characters
| Character | Side | SNK-developed | | Capcom-developed | |
| Character | Side | MotM | Chaos | CvS | CvS2 |
|---|---|---|---|---|---|
| (Japan) Akari Ichijou | SNK | Yes | No | No | No |
| (Japan) Akuma | Capcom | Yes | Yes | Yes | Yes |
| Athena | SNK | No | Yes | No | No |
| (Japan) Athena Asamiya | SNK | Yes | No | No | Yes |
| (Europe) Baby Bonnie Hood | Capcom | Yes | No | No | No |
| (United States) Balrog | Capcom | No | Yes | Yes | Yes |
| (Japan) Benimaru Nikaido | SNK | No | No | Yes | Yes |
| (Brazil) Blanka | Capcom | No | No | Yes | Yes |
| (United Kingdom) Cammy | Capcom | No | No | Yes | Yes |
| (South Korea) Chang Koehan | SNK | No | No | No | Yes |
| (South Korea) Choi Bounge | SNK | No | Yes | No | Assist (Note: In Capcom vs. SNK 2, Choi is not playable separately, but constantly accompanies Chang during battle and will attack opponents as part of Chang's moveset.) |
| (China) Chun-Li | Capcom | Yes | Yes | Yes | Yes |
| (Hong Kong) Dan | Capcom | Yes | Yes | Pro | Yes |
| (Romania) Demitri Maximoff | Capcom | No | Yes | No | No |
| (India) Dhalsim | Capcom | No | Yes | Yes | Yes |
| (Japan) E. Honda | Capcom | No | No | Yes | Yes |
| (United Kingdom) Eagle | Capcom | No | No | No | Yes |
| (United States) Earthquake | SNK | No | Yes | No | No |
| (Japan) Evil Ryu | Capcom | Yes | No | Yes | Home |
| (United States) Felicia | Capcom | Yes | No | No | No |
| (United States) Geese Howard | SNK | Yes | Yes | Yes | Yes |
| (Japan) Genjuro Kibagami | SNK | No | Yes | No | No |
| (Germany) God Rugal | SNK | No | No | No | Yes |
| Goenitz | SNK | No | Yes | No | No |
| (United States) Guile | Capcom | Yes | Yes | Yes | Yes |
| (Japan) Haohmaru | SNK | Yes | No | No | Yes |
| (Japan) Hibiki Takane | SNK | No | No | No | Yes |
| (Japan) Honki ni Natta Mr. Karate | SNK | No | Yes | No | No |
| (Germany) Hugo | Capcom | No | Yes | No | No |
| (Japan) Iori Yagami | SNK | Yes | Yes | Yes | Yes |
| (Japan) Joe Higashi | SNK | No | No | Pro | Yes |
| (Japan) Kasumi Todoh | SNK | No | Yes | No | No |
| (United States) Ken | Capcom | Yes | Yes | Yes | Yes |
| (South Korea) Kim Kaphwan | SNK | No | Yes | Yes | Yes |
| (France) King | SNK | No | No | Yes | Yes |
| (Japan) Kyo Kusanagi | SNK | Yes | Yes | Yes | Yes |
| (Japan) Kyosuke Kagami | Capcom | No | No | No | Yes |
| Leona Heidern | SNK | Yes | No | No | No |
| M. Bison | Capcom | Yes | Yes | Yes | Yes |
| (Japan) Mai Shiranui | SNK | Yes | Yes | Yes | Yes |
| (Japan) Maki | Capcom | No | No | No | Yes |
| Mars People | SNK | No | Yes | No | No |
| (Scotland) Morrigan Aensland | Capcom | Yes | No | Yes | Yes |
| (Japan) Mr. Karate | SNK | No | Yes | No | No |
| (Japan) Nakoruru | SNK | Yes | No | Yes | Yes |
| (Australia) Raiden | SNK | No | No | Yes | Yes |
| Red Arremer | Capcom | No | Yes | No | No |
| (United States) Rock Howard | SNK | No | No | No | Yes |
| (United States) Rolento | Capcom | No | No | No | Yes |
| (Germany) Rugal Bernstein | SNK | No | No | Yes | Yes |
| (Japan) Ryo Sakazaki | SNK | Yes | Yes | Yes | Yes |
| (Japan) Ryu | Capcom | Yes | Yes | Yes | Yes |
| (Japan) Ryuhaku Todoh | SNK | No | No | No | Yes |
| (Japan) Ryuji Yamazaki | SNK | No | No | Yes | Yes |
| (Thailand) Sagat | Capcom | No | Yes | Yes | Yes |
| (Japan) Sakura | Capcom | Yes | No | Yes | Yes |
| (Japan) Shiki | SNK | No | Yes | No | No |
| (Japan) Shin Akuma | Capcom | No | Yes | No | Yes |
| (United States) Terry Bogard | SNK | Yes | Yes | Yes | Yes |
| (Iceland) Tessa | Capcom | No | Yes | No | No |
| (Spain) Vega | Capcom | No | Yes | Yes | Yes |
| Vice | SNK | No | No | Yes | Yes |
| (United States) Violent Ken | Capcom | No | Yes | No | No |
| (Japan) Wild Iori | SNK | Yes | Yes | Yes | Home |
| (Hong Kong) Yun | Capcom | No | No | No | Yes |
| (Japan) Yuri Sakazaki | SNK | Yes | No | Yes | Yes |
| (Russia) Zangief | Capcom | Yes | No | Yes | Yes |
| Zero | Capcom | No | Yes | No | No |
| Total | | 22 | 36 | 35 | 48 |

== Reception ==
Card Fighters DS and SVC Chaos had a polarized, mixed reception, with a Metacritic score of 48% and 57% respectively; although SVC Chaos has been the subject of reappraisal as time went on, being often considered a cult classic by some outlets. The two Capcom-developed games and Match of the Millennium have fared better, with Capcom vs. SNK 2 achieving a Metacritic score of 81%.

In 2012, Complex ranked Capcom vs. SNK at number 38 on the list of the best video game franchises.
