= SNK vs. Capcom: SVC Chaos =

2003 video game

- Japanese arcade flyer depicting the characters Kyo Kusanagi and Ryu with art by Falcoon
- Developers: SNK Playmore; Code Mystics (Windows/Nintendo Switch/PlayStation 4)
- Publishers: SNK Playmore; Ignition Entertainment (PlayStation 2/Xbox)
- Producer: Eikichi Kawasaki
- Designer: T. Mieno
- Programmers: Bok Mannami; Cyber Kondo; M. Yusuke
- Artists: Nona; Falcoon
- Composers: Masahiko Hataya; Yasumasa Yamada; Yasuo Yamate
- Series: SNK vs. Capcom
- Platforms: Arcade, Neo Geo AES, PlayStation 2, Xbox, Windows, Nintendo Switch, PlayStation 4
- Release: July 2003: Arcade; JP/NA: July 2003 Neo Geo AES; NA/JP: November 14, 2003 PlayStation 2; JP: December 25, 2003; EU: April 15, 2005 Xbox; NA/JP: October 7, 2004; EU: March 18, 2005; AU: May 13, 2005 Windows; WW: July 20, 2024 Nintendo Switch, PlayStation 4; WW: July 22, 2024
- Genre: Fighting
- Modes: Single-player; Multiplayer
- Arcade system: Neo Geo MVS

SNK vs. Capcom: SVC Chaos (Note: Japanese: エス・エヌ・ケイ バーサス カプコン エスブイシー カオス, Hepburn: Esu Enu Kei Bāsasu Kapukon Esbuishī Kaosu), better known in arcades as SVC Chaos: SNK vs. Capcom, is a 2003 crossover fighting game developed and published by SNK Playmore for the Neo Geo arcade and home platform. It was then later ported to the PlayStation 2 and Xbox, although only the Xbox port was released in North America and both platforms were released in Japan and PAL regions.

It was the third arcade game in a series of crossovers between the two companies (see SNK vs. Capcom series) and the second developed by SNK (SNK previously produced SNK vs. Capcom: The Match of the Millennium for the Neo Geo Pocket Color).

The Xbox port of the game includes online multiplayer. While Xbox Live for the original Xbox was discontinued in 2010, SNK vs. Capcom: SVC Chaos is now playable online using the replacement Xbox Live servers called Insignia.

The game was re-released in July 2024 for Nintendo Switch, PlayStation 4, and PC via Steam and GOG.com, adding online rollback netcode from Code Mystics and an in-game gallery.

== Gameplay ==
Arcade version screenshot of a match between Kyo and Ryu

The gameplay is based on the KOF series (particularly The King of Fighters 2002), with the same four button configuration and many of the same techniques. However, the game does not use the Team Battle format, but follows the traditional round-based one-on-one format. Each match begins with a dialogue exchange between the player's character and the opponent. One new technique introduced in the game is the Front Grand Step, which allows the player to cancel attacks with a forward dash. The player can perform this technique while guarding from an opponent's attack, which will consume one Power Gauge level.

The game uses a different type of Power Gauge known as the Groove Power Gauge System, which has three levels. The Groove gauge fills as the player lands attacks against the opponents or guard attacks. When the gauge fills to Lv. 1 or Lv. 2, the player can perform Super Special Moves, a Guard Cancel Attack or a Guard Cancel Front Step maneuver. When the gauge is full, its reaches MAXIMUM level and a MAX Activation occurs. During MAX Activation, the gauge will change into a timer and the player gains the ability to cancel any of their moves anytime (in addition to Super Special Moves and Guard Cancels). Once the timer runs out, the gauge returns to Lv. 2.

In addition to the regular Super Special Move, each character also has an 'Exceed' move which can only be performed once when the player's life is less than half.

== Characters ==
This crossover features a total of 24 standard fighters, plus 12 boss characters for a total of 36. These characters are drawn primarily from both SNK and Capcom's respective fighting game sequels such as The King of Fighters '96 and Super Street Fighter II Turbo, alongside additional character appearances from Samurai Shodown, Art of Fighting, Metal Slug 2, Athena, Darkstalkers, Final Fight, Mega Man Zero, Ghosts 'n Goblins, and Red Earth. Most of the boss characters are normally inaccessible and require the use of cheat codes to become playable, while two of the bosses, Athena and Red Arremer, are fully inaccessible in the arcade and AES releases, and can only be unlocked in the PlayStation 2 and Xbox versions of the game. All 36 characters are immediately accessible in the 2024 release. Original characters from this game Violent Ken (based on his brainwashed state from Street Fighter II: The Animated Movie) and Serious Mr. Karate (based on original Mr. Karate's first appearance in Art of Fighting) were later being introduced to the main canon games Ultra Street Fighter II and The King of Fighters XIII respectively.

=== SNK characters ===
- Athena (Note: Boss character)
- Choi Bounge
- Earthquake
- Geese Howard
- Genjuro Kibagami
- Goenitz
- Iori Yagami
- Kasumi Todoh
- Kim Kaphwan
- Kyo Kusanagi
- Mai Shiranui
- Mars People
- Mr. Karate
- Orochi Iori
- Ryo Sakazaki
- Shiki
- Serious Mr. Karate
- Terry Bogard

=== Capcom characters ===
- Akuma
- Balrog
- Chun-Li
- Dan Hibiki
- Demitri Maximoff
- Dhalsim
- Guile
- Hugo
- Ken Masters
- M. Bison
- Red Arremer
- Ryu
- Sagat
- Shin Akuma
- Tessa
- Vega
- Violent Ken
- Zero

== Reception ==
Reception

Aggregate scores
Aggregator	Score		
Aggregator	PS2	PS4	Xbox
GameRankings	64%	N/A	58%
Metacritic	56/100	64/100	57/100

Review scores
Publication	Score		
Publication	PS2	PS4	Xbox
1Up.com	N/A	N/A	30%
Electronic Gaming Monthly	N/A	N/A	5/10
Famitsu	25/40	N/A	N/A
Game Informer	N/A	N/A	6.5/10
GameSpot	N/A	N/A	6.3/10
GameSpy	N/A	N/A	2/5
GamesTM	60%	N/A	N/A
GameZone	N/A	N/A	7.8/10
IGN	N/A	N/A	6/10
Official Xbox Magazine (US)	N/A	N/A	7/10
PALGN	N/A	N/A	4/10
Play	67%	N/A	N/A
TeamXbox	N/A	N/A	6.5/10

SNK vs. Capcom: SVC Chaos has received mixed reception, such as the rushed and bland presentation of the game (as seen in stages with very few colors and devoid of "life"), and the low resolution of the Neo Geo (320 × 240) made the game's visuals considerably rough considering the game's 2003 release. The PlayStation 2 and Xbox versions received "mixed" reviews according to the review aggregation website Metacritic. In Japan, Famitsu gave the PS2 version a score of three sixes and one seven for a total of 25 out of 40.

In 2012, Complex ranked it as the 14th best SNK fighting game ever made, adding that "the game’s secret characters (Firebrand, Mars People, Zero, etc.) had to be the best part about this game," as well as newly animated sprites (Demitri, Earthquake, Tessa, etc.) But it was also criticized by others due to the lack of certain "token" characters (like Haohmaru, Benimaru, Zangief, etc.), and the omission of the selectable fighting styles called "Groove Systems" all showcased by Capcom, instead featuring only one-on-one modes with extended vital gauges, not giving any choice to players who favored other styles, even those created by SNK itself.

== Merchandise ==
An eight-volume graphic novel series of translated Chinese manhua was published in the U.S. by DrMaster Publications Inc., originally created by Happy Comics Ltd. Unlike the game, which lacks a plot for the most part, the manhua has its own one where, following a cataclysmic event, all life on the planet has been wiped out. In purgatory, a group of fighters are drawn into a tournament by Athena and Red Arremer, avatars for the forces of Order and Chaos, who promise that the winner will receive one wish. Now the fighters compete to win the tournament and have their wish granted, with the fate of all life hanging in the balance.
