= Athena: Awakening from the Ordinary Life =

1999 video game

- Developer: Yumekobo
- Publisher: SNK
- Series: Athena; Psycho Soldier
- Platform: Sony PlayStation
- Release: JP: 4 March 1999
- Genre: Adventure
- Mode: Single-player

Athena: Awakening from the Ordinary Life (Japanese: アテナ ～Awakening from the Ordinary Life～) is a 1999 adventure game developed by Yumekobo and published by SNK for the Sony PlayStation. The game stars SNK character Athena Asamiya, a normal Japanese high school student who suddenly learns psychic powers which she uses to solve puzzles and overcome obstacles. The game was never released outside of Japan. The game's plot was adapted into a 12-episode television series, titled Athena, in 1998.

== Story ==
The game stars Athena Asamiya, and is set in the year 2018. She is a 16-year-old high school student who one day discovers she has psychic powers.

Another SNK character named Sie Kensou also appears, and he is in love with Athena.

== Gameplay ==
Athena: Awakening from the Ordinary Life is an adventure game using three-dimensional graphics. While the full-motion video opening cutscene contains voice acting, the gameplay contains no voice acting and instead the dialogue is displayed via text. The gameplay resembles both Clock Tower and Resident Evil, but while the presentation resembles Resident Evil, there is less focus on action. Instead, focus on the game is on puzzle solving and computer generated movies.

Athena can learn psychic powers to advance in the game. There are a total of ten psychic powers in the game, including telepathy, clairvoyance, teleportation, psychometry, and psychography. These powers in the game are used to find items, and clear obstacles in the game. To use the powers in game, a box at the top left of the screen displays a green line, and shows buttons that must be pressed at certain time intervals. The mechanism to use the powers resembles rhythm games such as PaRappa the Rapper.

== Development ==
The game was developed by Japanese game developer Yumekobo, who also developed The King of Fighters: Kyo, a spin-off of The King of Fighters series which is a visual novel with strategy game elements focusing on the character Kyo Kusanagi.

The game stars Athena Asamiya. She appeared originally in Psycho Soldier and then later in the fighting game series The King of Fighters. The game is not a sequel to any previous game, including The King of Fighters series, and has no continuity with previous titles featuring Athena. This game marked the first time she appeared fully in a sailor fuku (Japanese school uniform). During her appearance in The King of Fighters games, she would very briefly appear in a sailor fuku. This game would be the first game where she wears a sailor fuku for the entire game. She would later wear a sailor fuku in The King of Fighters XI, The King of Fighters XII, The King of Fighters XIII and Days of Memories.

== Release ==
The game was released on 4 March 1999 for the Sony PlayStation home console, and was published by SNK. The game was tied in with a 12 episode live action television series, simply titled as Athena which follows the plot of the game. It starred Kei Ishibashi in the title role.

The game was released for the PlayStation Network Game Archives for PlayStation 3 and PlayStation Portable on August 30, 2007. It was also later released on the PlayStation Vita in 2012.

== Reception ==
Reception

Review scores
Publication	Score
Famitsu	28/40
Video Games	50%
Consoles +	90/100

Famitsu magazine gave the game a score of 28 out of 40. Reviewers praised the high-quality graphics and videos, and highlighted the dinosaurs as looking very good. Others praised the science fiction storyline, camera angles, and expressive characters.

Ralph Karels writing in the German gaming magazine Video Games gave it a 50% score. He noted that the game is very text-heavy and requires a lot of proficiency in the Japanese language. He also questioned why the game had no voice acting and complained about the short length of the game. Even with three compact discs, he had gotten to disc two after only 40 minutes of gameplay. He also praised the game's various CGI movies as top quality.

Loading praised the game calling it a forgotten title.
