= The Last Blade: Beyond the Destiny =

2000 video game

- Developer: SNK
- Publisher: SNK
- Platforms: Neo Geo Pocket Color, Nintendo Switch
- Release: Neo Geo Pocket Color: JP: March 16, 2000; EU: 2001; Nintendo Switch; October 28, 2020
- Genre: Fighting
- Modes: Single-player, multiplayer

The Last Blade: Beyond the Destiny is a fighting game released by SNK in April 2000 for the Neo Geo Pocket Color. It is the third game in The Last Blade series. The European release was subject to a recall when SNK ceased all foreign operations a month later, making it one of the rarest English language titles in Neo Geo Pocket Color's library. The game was later re-released as part of Neo Geo Pocket Color Selection Vol. 1 in 2021.

== Gameplay ==
The game features a story mode, a survival mode, a time attack mode, and a training mode. Points are earned through gameplay, which can be spent in the in-game gallery to unlock artwork, playable characters, minigames, and equippable boosts.

== Characters ==
The Last Blade: Beyond the Destiny features 16 playable characters, nine of which are available from the start. This includes every playable character from the arcade release of The Last Blade 2, with the exceptions of Juzoh Kanzaki and Mukuro, who are playable only in unlockable minigames; and Shigen Naoe, who is fully absent.

- Akari Ichijou
- Hagure Hitogata (Note: Unlockable character)
- Hibiki Takane
- Hyo Amano
- Kaede (Note: Also unlockable as "Awakened Kaede")
- Kaori Sanada
- Keiichiro Washizuka
- Kouryu
- Lee Rekka
- Moriya Minakata
- Okina no Genbu
- Setsuna
- Shinnosuke Kagami
- Yuki
- Zantetsu

== Reception ==
Reception

Aggregate score
Aggregator	Score
Metacritic	68/100 (Switch)

Review scores
Publication	Score
GameSpot	7.6/10 (NGPC)
IGN	7.0/10 (NGPC)
Nintendo Life	7/10 (Switch)
Nintendo World Report	7.5/10 (Switch)
Silicon Magazine	76/100 (NGPC)

IGN said: "You can't go wrong with Last Blade, but you could go even more right with SNK vs. Capcom and Gals Fighters." Jeff Gerstmann of GameSpot called Beyond the Destiny "a good fighting game, with more options and features than you'd expect from a portable fighter" but recommended to get SNK vs. Capcom: The Match of the Millennium instead. Nintendo Life called the Switch port "[...] an excellent little thing, one must keep in mind that it is still a 2001 handheld fighting game, and very much of its time." Nintendo World Report said of the Switch port: "Being able to play with a friend on a single system is nice, though, although The Last Blade won't give you the multiplayer mileage than Smash Bros. does." Hardcore Gamer called it "may be the finest-playing NGPC game available yet on the Switch". Time Extension placed the game on its "Best Neo Geo Pocket Color Games" list.
