= Hyo (disambiguation) =

Hyo is the Korean name for filial piety, one of the eight Confucian virtues that emphasizes a respect for one's parents and ancestors.

Fictional characters with the given name Hyo include:

- Hyo Imawano, a character from the Rival Schools video game series
- Hyo Amano, a character from the Last Blade video game series

Hyo can also refer to:

- Hyoyeon, also known as Hyo or DJ Hyo, a member of the South Korean girl group Girls' Generation.
