= Akuma (Street Fighter) =

Street Fighter character

- Street Fighter character
- Akuma in Valkyrie Connect
- First appearance: Super Street Fighter II Turbo (1994)
- Created by: Noritaka Funamizu
- Designed by: Akira "Akiman" Yasuka
- Voiced by: English: Dale Wilson (TV series); David Kaye (TV series); Keith Burgess (SF Alpha: The Movie, SF Alpha: Generations); Dave Mallow (2007–2012); Richard Epcar (2016–2020); Christopher Guerrero (2024); Japanese: Tomomichi Nishimura (1995–2005); Daisuke Gōri (SF Alpha: Generations); Yasushi Ikeda (Real Battle on Film); Taketora (2007–present)
- Portrayed by: Various: Ernie Reyes Sr. (arcade game); Joey Ansah (Legacy and Assassin's Fist); Gaku Space (Assassin's Fist as Young Akuma); Daniel Lue (Street Fighter: Genesis); Roman Reigns (2026 film)

In-universe information
- Fighting style: Ansatsuken
- Origin: Japan
- Nationality: Japanese

Akuma (Japanese: 悪魔; meaning "Devil", "Demon"), known in Japan as Gouki (豪鬼; lit. "Great Demon"), is a fictional character from the Street Fighter series of fighting games created by Capcom. Akuma made his debut in Super Street Fighter II Turbo as a secret character and an alternative boss to the villain M. Bison. In the storyline, he is the younger brother of Gouken, Ryu's and Ken's master. After defeating his brother, Akuma gains interest in several fighters, most notably Ryu as he senses that the protagonist has a similar power to him known as the Satsui no Hadou. In some games, he also has an alternate version named Shin Akuma or Shin Gouki (真・豪鬼; the "True Great Demon") in Japanese and Oni Akuma in Super Street Fighter IV: Arcade Edition.

Born out of a request between developers from the franchise, Akuma was developed to contrast both M. Bison and Ryu. He often appeared as a guest character in other franchises, most notably as a guest in the Namco Bandai Games' Tekken 7. Akuma has also appeared in printed and animated adaptations of the Street Fighter series which explore his relationship with Ryu. Since his debut, Akuma has appeared in several subsequent titles and has been praised by both fans and critics. The character has often been praised for his dark personality contrasting the recurring M. Bison as well as how overpowered he is.

== Creation and design ==
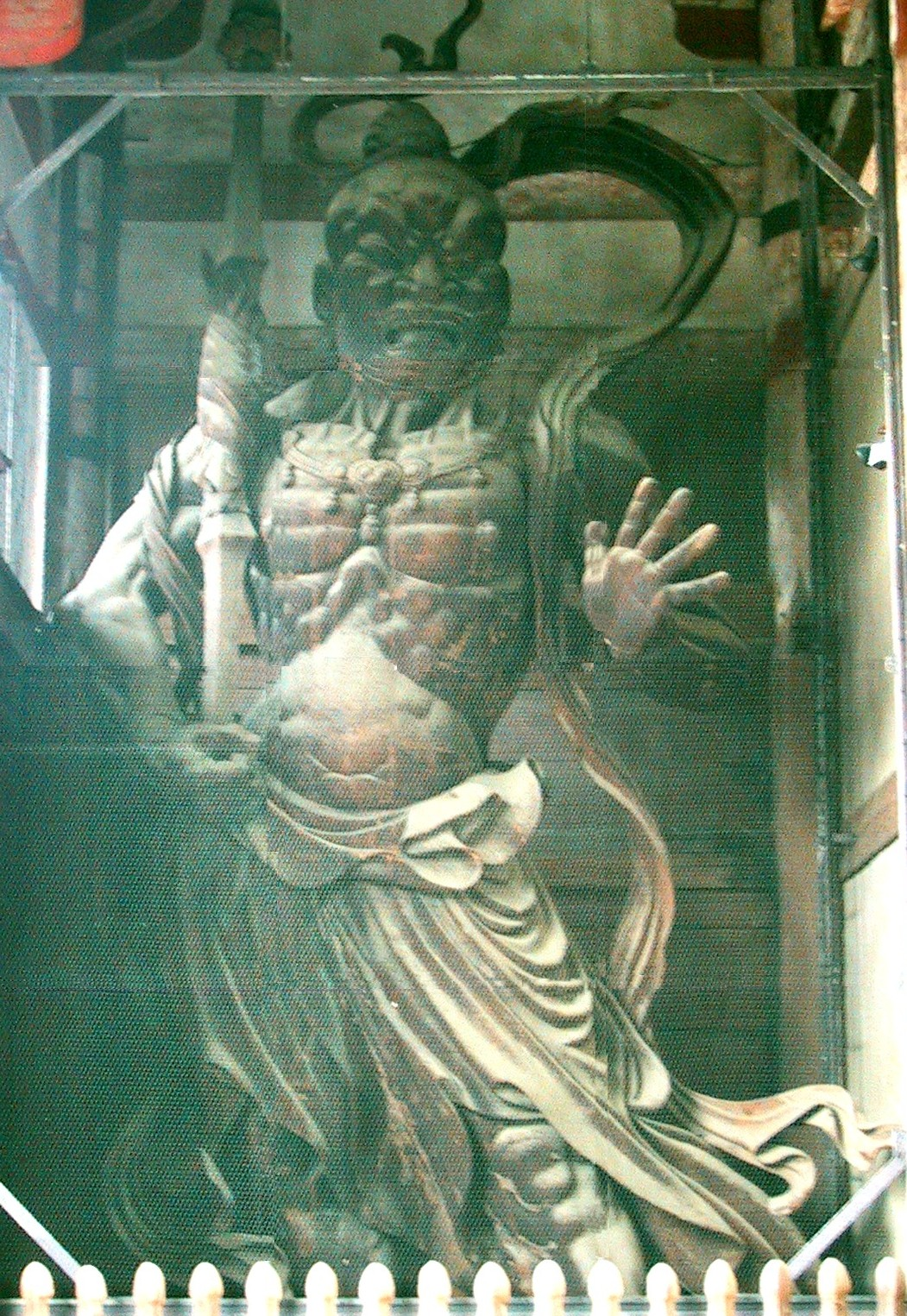
Akuma's design was influenced by Kongorikishi statues.

Akuma was created by request of Noritaka Funamizu to Akiman when creating a new Street Fighter character. Akuma was designed in order to please fans who were victims of April's Fools in the claims from journalists that there was a hidden character named Sheng Long. Funamizu wanted the character, Akuma, to be based on Ryu's design. While still being an evil character, Yasuda still wanted to create a major contrast between the regular boss, M. Bison, and Akuma. Akuma was created in a single hour when the designer was asked by his superiors to make something similar to the Super Saiyan transformation from the Dragon Ball franchise, based on Yoshiki Okamoto's directions. Akiman, who was in charge of the design, explained that "the face is based on a Buddha statue or a Kongo Rikishi statue". The Japanese kanji "ten" (天) — meaning "Heaven" —, was added by the staff at the time in a fit of impulse.

Akuma first appears in Super Street Fighter II Turbo defeating the final boss with his Shun Goku Satsu (瞬獄殺, Shun Goku Satsu; lit. "Instant Prison Murder") (despite this, the move cannot be used ingame outside of the cutscene) technique which acts in fast fashion. The same move has been shown in other games like in Street Fighter IV where Akuma is seen defeating Gouken in the intro whereas Ryu's evil alter egos have performed it influenced by the Satsui no Hadou that Akuma controls and masters like Oni. Akuma's introduction in Super Street Fighter II Turbo stemmed from the development team's desire to introduce a "mysterious and really powerful" character, with his status as a hidden character within the game resulting from later discussions. When asked regarding the presence of Akuma as a secret character in several of Capcom's fighting games, Capcom's Noritaka Funamizu stated that, while he did not personally support the concept, he said, "Akuma is a character that can fit in any game design nicely".

Starting Street Fighter Alpha 2, Capcom created a stronger alter-ego of Akuma called Shin Akuma in order to challenge the player. Because he wears a purple gi, he was called "Blue Shin Gouki" by developers. Shin Akuma's appearance is very similar to Akuma's; for example, in the Street Fighter Alpha series, Shin Akuma had a purple karate gi instead of a dark gray one and marginally darker skin tone. Similar to Shin Akuma, Capcom created another alterego of Akuma: Oni was created to be beyond Shin Akuma. Despite being based on Akuma from the Street Fighter IV games, his body type, skill composition, and skill performance are all different. Akuma's appearance remained consistent until Street Fighter V where his hair reaches far longer and has grown around his face, like a lion's mane. Takayuki Nakayama explained that the staff considered multiple designs that were scrapped such as a shirtless look, multiple scars within the body, one with a broken shirt and one where he carried a baby. Scrapped designs involve Akuma taking care of a baby which went through several trials and errors when developing the game. Street Fighter 6 also uses Shin Akuma but under the label of "SiN Akuma" or "SiN Gouki" starting with a fanevent made in Japan in 2024.

Akuma appears as a character in Namco's Tekken 7. He was specifically chosen by staff member Katsuhiro Harada who believed he would easily fit into the Tekken world. In regards to his transition from Street Fighter character to Tekken, Namco worked properly to balance him with the rest. There was no model from Capcom so Akuma's entire character in Tekken 7 was completely created by Namco. However, they were careful with not making him authentic to his original persona. Kazuya Mishima fights Akuma during the end of story mode; explained that the outcome of the fight was intentionally ambiguous, saying: "It's still a work in progress." He joked that a scene with Akuma being killed could negatively affect Namco's relationship with Capcom, particularly Capcom COO Kenzo Tsujimoto who would get back at Harada and Street Fighter producer Yoshinori Ono, after the latter had struck a close friendship with Harada leading to the collaboration of the two franchises.

== Appearances ==
=== Street Fighter game series ===
Akuma made his debut in Super Street Fighter II Turbo, the fifth arcade iteration of the Street Fighter II games, where he appears as a hidden and unnamed character. After meeting certain requirements, Akuma appears prior to the player's final match with M. Bison and obliterates M. Bison before challenging the player. In the Japanese arcade version of the game, Akuma would introduce himself to the player before the match, proclaiming himself to be the "Master of the Fist" (拳を極めし者, Ken o Kiwameshi Mono). He also has two endings in the game as well: one for defeating M. Bison and another against himself. While the dialogue in these endings was omitted from the international releases of the arcade game, they were edited into one ending and included in the English localization of Super Turbo Revival for the Game Boy Advance. Shin Akuma is, however, an unlockable playable character in the Game Boy Advance version of the game, Super Street Fighter II Turbo Revival, as well as the Japan-only Dreamcast version of the game, Super Street Fighter II X for Matching Service. In the latter version, another version of Akuma referred to as Tien Gouki can also be selected.

Akuma appears in Street Fighter Alpha: Warriors' Dreams, where he was given his name, once again as a hidden opponent and unlockable character. His backstory remains the same as in Super Turbo. Akuma was added to the immediate roster in Street Fighter Alpha 2 and Street Fighter Alpha 3, with a powered-up version of the character named "Shin Akuma" appearing as a hidden opponent. The character's relation with other Street Fighter characters begins to be fleshed out, establishing rivalries with Guy, Adon, Gen and Ryu. Shin Akuma, rather than "Final Bison", is Evil Ryu's final boss in the console versions of Street Fighter Alpha 3.

Akuma and Shin Akuma are featured in Street Fighter EX as hidden boss characters, where he is one of the few characters able to move out of the 2D playing field, during his teleport. Akuma also appears in the arcade and home video game console adaption of Street Fighter: The Movie despite not appearing in the movie. In the game it is said that he is the brother of Sheng Long and not Gouken.

Akuma is featured in the Street Fighter III series beginning with Street Fighter III 2nd Impact: Giant Attack. Like in his debut in Super Turbo, Akuma is both a secret opponent who serves as an alternate final boss and an unlockable character, with the CPU-controlled version being the "Shin Akuma" incarnation introduced in Alpha 2. He is a regular character in Street Fighter III 3rd Strike. Akuma reappears in Street Fighter IV, being one of the main antagonists and once again a secret boss in the Arcade Mode as well as an unlockable character in both console versions. A new form of Akuma, known as Oni (狂オシキ鬼, Kuruoshiki Oni; lit. The Mad Demon), was confirmed in Super Street Fighter IV: Arcade Edition by leaked videos. Akuma returns in Street Fighter V as a downloadable character, and again appears as a downloadable character in Street Fighter 6.

=== Other video games ===
Akuma has appeared in some form or another through many Capcom games outside the Street Fighter franchise. The first of these appearances was in the fighting game X-Men: Children of the Atom, where Akuma (in his Super Turbo incarnation) appears as a nameless hidden character. He would appear in the later Marvel-licensed fighting games (see Marvel vs. Capcom series). In X-Men vs. Street Fighter, he is a regular character but–in a nod to his hidden character status in other games–his select box is hidden. In Marvel Super Heroes vs. Street Fighter, he appears both as a selectable character and as "Cyber Akuma" ("Mech Gouki" in Japan), a mechanized version enhanced by Apocalypse acting as the Horseman of Death and the final boss. He is absent from Marvel vs. Capcom: Clash of Super Heroes; in his stead, Ryu has a Hyper Combo that changes his fighting style to incorporate Akuma's moveset. He reappears as a playable character in the sequels: Marvel vs. Capcom 2: New Age of Heroes, Marvel vs. Capcom 3: Fate of Two Worlds and Ultimate Marvel vs. Capcom 3.

In the SNK vs. Capcom series, Akuma appears in SNK vs. Capcom: The Match of the Millennium as an unlockable character and in Capcom vs. SNK: Millennium Fight 2000 as a Ratio 4 character. He also appears in Capcom vs. SNK 2 and SNK vs. Capcom: SVC Chaos as both regular Akuma and Shin Akuma. In Capcom vs. SNK 2, a different form of Shin Akuma appears. This form of Akuma achieves a new level of power when a dying Rugal Bernstein pours his Orochi power into him. His name is spelled in Japanese as 神・豪鬼, with the "Shin" character meaning "God" instead of the usual "True". Also, various version of Akuma have appeared in the SNK vs. Capcom: Card Fighters series.

Akuma appears as a special guest character in Tekken 7. In the game's story, he seeks to repay a debt to Kazumi Mishima for saving his life from an unknown critical situation, who asks him to kill her husband Heihachi and his son Kazuya for her if she dies. When Heihachi is finally dead for good at the hands of Kazuya, he is Akuma's only target left. Similar to his appearances in the Street Fighter series, Akuma replaces Kazumi as a secret arcade mode final boss if certain conditions are met.

He also appears in Namco × Capcom. He appears as both a playable character and one of the final boss characters in the crossover fighting game Street Fighter X Tekken. Akuma also appears in the fighting video game Street Fighter X Mega Man, as a hidden boss. Akuma also appears in Super Puzzle Fighter II Turbo as the final boss, Super Gem Fighter Mini Mix (known as Pocket Fighter in Japan) as an unlockable character, and in the Japanese console version of Cyberbots: Full Metal Madness as a mecha named "Zero Gouki". He is featured in a DLC episode of the action video game Asura's Wrath, alongside Ryu as an opponent. In Super Smash Bros. Ultimate, Akuma appears as a "spirit"; a type of collectible item that can be used to enhance the abilities of playable characters. Akuma also appears in Capcom's collaboration in Monster Hunter Rise and Monster Hunter Wilds. Akuma also appears as a "crossover" character in Brawlhalla with mirrored abilities of Val.

== Other media ==
=== Live-action ===
Actor and martial artist Joey Ansah played Akuma in the short film Street Fighter: Legacy. Akuma also appears in Street Fighter: Assassin's Fist, an online series by Capcom and the creators of Street Fighter: Legacy with Ansah reprised his role from Legacy and Gaku Space as Young Gouki. In Assassin's Fist, both of Akuma's names are used; Akuma being the moniker Gouki had assumed after the Satsui no Hado took him over completely. Both Ansah and Space will return for the second season titled Street Fighter: World Warrior. WWE wrestler Roman Reigns portrayed Akuma in the 2026 reboot film co-produced by Legendary Entertainment and Capcom.

=== Animation ===
Akuma made cameo appearances in Street Fighter II: The Animated Movie and in the Japanese TV series Street Fighter II V.

Akuma's first speaking appearance in animation was in an episode of the American Street Fighter animated series titled "Strange Bedfellows". He reappears in another episode, "The World's Greatest Warrior", in which he defeats Ryu and Ken's master Gouken and challenges Gouken's two students to a duel.

Akuma also figures in the Japanese OVA Street Fighter Alpha: The Animation, where Ryu's encounters with Akuma triggers the "Dark Hadou" in Ryu. Akuma is also the central focus in the OVA Street Fighter Alpha: Generations, which explores his past and ties the character's past with Ryu's. He appears in the beginning of the movie Street Fighter 4: The Ties That Bind, where he enters Ryu's mind and torments him.

=== Comics ===
UDON Entertainment's line of Street Fighter comics sets Akuma in his origin story on how he became a demon and murdering Goutetsu with the power of the Dark Hadou; he fights against Gouken ten years later, as they fight, Gouken eventually wins against Akuma as he falls off a cliff; Gouken tries to save him, but Akuma willingly drops himself into a river, only for him to survive the drop.

In 2012, band MegaDriver released a song about Akuma's character, called "Wrath of the Raging Demon". In 2014, band Skelator released a song about Akuma, called "Raging Demon". In 2015, rapper Tauz released a tribute song to Akuma, called "Rap do Akuma". In 2021, the band RAVENOUS E.H. released a song about Akuma called "Die 1,000 Deaths".

Akuma forms a substantial part of the Rensuke Oshikiri manga and Netflix TV series Hi Score Girl; Akuma is discovered (as a hidden character) by the female lead Oono (who typically plays Zangief), and Akuma subsequently becomes the fighter and alter-ego of Hidaka, Oono's rival. The animated show contains long sequences of actual gameplay (that is, recorded video of actual gameplay) intercut with the animation. The bulk of episode 20 is the long battle between Hidaka playing Akuma and Oono playing Zangief.

== Promotion and reception ==
Akuma artwork was featured on an officially licensed NubyTech/UDON joypad for the PlayStation 2, announced on September 27, 2004. It was also featured on a separate NubyTech/UDON joypad for the Xbox, announced on May 25, 2005.

Akuma has received much critical acclaim from various gaming media outlets. Paste described him as "a great anti-hero to offset Ryu and Ken." Rich Knight of Complex, regarded Akuma's SSFII Turbo appearance as the "coolest boss battle ever": "Akuma rushed into our lives and onto the screen ... and then demolish[ed] you in seconds." Elton Jones of Complex deemed Akuma agreed while calling him the "most dominant fighting game character". On a different note, GamesRadar claimed that Akuma is different from other antagonists seen in gaming as while cannot be called evil, his methods and actions are forbidden. Alex Eckman-Lawn of Topless Robot deemed him the "most diabolical" fighting-game boss citing the large impact of his debut where he defeats M. Bison while replacing him as the final boss of his video game. Such impact let to Bryan Dawson of Prima Games calling him "irreplaceable". The character was also praised for his fighting techniques and has appeared in several polls. Ben Lee of Digital Spy said that he was "truly exciting to fight against" in Super Street Fighter II Turbo, "and his cold, emotionless personality was utterly terrifying." Nicholas Wave said that Akuma represents Ryu's potential darkness as the protagonist struggles to become more unique with every installment.

Chad Hunter of Complex praised Akuma's Raging Demon move as he "grabs his opponent and the screen goes black and all you [hear] is a flurry of hits." Prima Games named it the seventh-"greatest fighting move in video game history", and Arcade Sushi's Angelo Dargenio considered it "one of the most well-known super moves in videogame history, spawning several parody moves in multiple fighting games over the years." Gavin Jasper of Den of Geek, regarded Akuma in X-Men: Children of the Atom as the top fighting-game guest character. While Jason Fanelli of Arcade Sushi considered it "the best guest turn he's ever done," he simultaneously criticized his cameo in Cyberbots: Full Metal Madness: "Akuma doesn't need to be a giant mech for extra exposure." Chris Hoadley of VentureBeat labeled Akuma one of the "best fighting game clones" as his model recicled Ryu and Ken with variations of their moves Gavin Jasper from Den of Geek praised his antagonism with Ryu, for standing out as his corrupted version similar to Darth Vader towards Luke Skywalker in the Star Wars films. Jasper believes that the rivalry is at its best in the III manga where both fighters engage in a mortal one-on-one duel.

In Tekken 7, a bonus fight between Devil Kazuya and Akuma could be unlocked. Calling Devil Kazuya a difficult opponent, Shacknews and Hobby Consolas said that Akuma offered players a challenge; gamers needed to learn Devil Kazuya's moves to defeat him, resulting in the game's most difficult fight.

Despite the character's popularity, Akuma has often been criticized for his perceived status as an excessively powerful character in the Street Fighter series. Even in this weakened form, he is the most powerful character in the game, and has historically been banned in all competitive tournaments of the game, including updated versions of Super Turbo. GamePro considered Akuma "ridiculously powerful" for his moves that were "the bane of newbies and veterans alike," a sentiment that was echoed by Christopher Hooton of Metro. Lucas Sullivan of GamesRadar ranked Akuma eleventh in his list of "12 unfair fighting game bosses that (almost) made us rage quit" in 2014. "Even if you ever do manage to finally defeat Akuma, it somehow doesn't feel earned. It's more like the computer felt sorry for you." Akuma's Oni incarnation has received a mixed reception. Imran Khan of Paste rated Oni as one of the "all-time worst" series characters, lamenting the redesign that made Akuma interesting and instead making him look like a rejected Dragon Ball Z character. Randolph Ramsay of GameSpot considered Oni "one of the least interesting additions" to Super Street Fighter IV, as he utilized moves similar to those of other characters. Den of Geek and Paste Magazine had mixed feelings about Oni, having considered Akuma to sport a better design despite enjoying the concept of Oni being the original character having obtained more power at the cost of his own humanity, losing the original concept's appeal.
