= Neo Geo Pocket Color Selection =

- Key art for Nintendo Switch version of Vol. 1
- Developers: SNK; Code Mystics
- Publisher: SNK
- Platforms: Nintendo Switch, Windows
- Release: Nintendo Switch; Vol. 1: WW: March 17, 2021; Vol. 2: WW: November 9, 2022; Windows; Vol. 1: WW: September 29, 2021; Vol. 2: WW: November 9, 2022
- Genre: Various
- Modes: Single-player, multiplayer

Neo Geo Pocket Color Selection is a pair of video game compilations developed by SNK and Code Mystics. Each of the two volumes contain emulated versions of 10 games originally published by SNK between 1999 and 2000 for the company's short-lived Neo Geo Pocket Color handheld game console, including some featuring characters from fellow game developer Capcom. The first volume was released for Nintendo Switch in March 2021, followed by a release for Windows the following September. The second volume was released for both systems in November 2022.

== Features ==
Prior to the compilations' release, 12 of the included games were re-released individually for the Nintendo Switch beginning in 2019. The compilations retain the individual re-releases' features, including the ability to rewind gameplay and create save states, various screen filters and borders, and the option to play games compatible with the original Neo Geo Pocket in monochrome. The player can also view 3D models of each game's box art and cartridge, as well as digitized versions of the original instruction manuals.

Both the Japanese and English releases of each game are included, with the exception of three games in Vol. 2 that were never localized. Several games, most prominently SNK's fighting games, support local multiplayer between two players on a single system; however, certain multiplayer features such as item trading are omitted. SNK vs. Capcom: Card Fighters' Clash, featured on Vol. 2, includes both the Capcom and SNK versions of the game, with the ability to battle and trade cards between the two on a single system.

=== Games included ===
Each compilation contains 10 games. One game featured in Vol. 1 was replaced for the Windows version, instead receiving a standalone release outside the collection. Vol. 2 features a secret minigame, a remake of the 1979 SNK arcade game Yosaku, accessed by playing The King of Fighters: Battle de Paradise in "Black and White" mode.

==== Volume 1 ====
- Big Tournament Golf (Note: Not available as a standalone release)
- Crush Roller (Note: Windows version only)
- Dark Arms: Beast Buster 1999
- Fatal Fury: First Contact
- King of Fighters R-2
- The Last Blade: Beyond the Destiny
- Metal Slug 1st Mission
- Metal Slug 2nd Mission
- Samurai Shodown! 2
- SNK Gals' Fighters
- SNK vs. Capcom: The Match of the Millennium (Note: Nintendo Switch version only; released separately on Windows)

==== Volume 2 ====
- Baseball Stars Color
- Big Bang Pro Wrestling
- Biomotor Unitron
- Ganbare Neo Poke-kun (Note: Japanese language only)
- The King of Fighters: Battle de Paradise
- Mega Man: Battle & Fighters
- Neo Geo Cup '98 Plus Color
- Pocket Tennis Color
- Puzzle Link 2
- SNK vs. Capcom: Card Fighters' Clash

== Reception ==
Neo Geo Pocket Color Selection Vol. 1

Aggregate scores
Aggregator	Score
Metacritic	79/100 (NS); 76/100 (PC)
OpenCritic	77%

Review scores
Publication	Score
Hardcore Gamer	4/5
Nintendo Life	8/10 stars
Nintendo World Report	9/10
TouchArcade	4.5/5

Neo Geo Pocket Color Selection Vol. 2

Aggregate scores
Aggregator	Score
Metacritic	65/100 (NS)
OpenCritic	63%

Review scores
Publication	Score
Nintendo Life	6/10 stars
TouchArcade	4/5

Neo Geo Pocket Color Selection Vol. 1 received positive reviews. Critics praised the selection of games offered, but lamented the fact that most of them were already available as standalone releases on Nintendo Switch.

In contrast, Vol. 2 received average reviews, with many claiming that the selection of games was not as strong as that of Vol. 1.
