= The King of Fighters: Battle de Paradise =

2000 video game

The King Of Fighters: Battle De Paradise
- Japanese cover
- Developer: SNK
- Publisher: SNK
- Series: The King of Fighters
- Platform: Neo-Geo Pocket Color
- Release: JP: June 6, 2000
- Genre: Party
- Modes: Single-player, multiplayer

The King Of Fighters: Battle De Paradise (Japanese: THE KING OF FIGHTERS バトル DE パラダイス) is a digital tabletop game released for the Neo Geo Pocket Color. It was released on June 6, 2000 by SNK in Japan. Based on The King of Fighters fighting game series by SNK, the story focuses on four characters created for this installment who are transferred into the game console and take on an adventure assisted by The King of Fighters characters and other SNK IPs. The game was re-released in 2022 as part of the Neo Geo Pocket Color Selection Vol. 2 compilation.

== Gameplay ==
The game is a digital tabletop game similar to sugoroku where characters compete against each other in a map where they throw dice to progress and find enough stars to become the winner. There are four playable character: Yu G, Ai, Masamune, and Hatako. The main game takes place on the map screen. Players first decide who will go first and who will go second, then roll the dice and move their pieces the number of times the dice rolls. Once they have completed the number of turns at the start, the game ends. If they land on a square along the way, a battle game or event may occur.

Players are assisted by "Strikers", fighters created by SNK. The game The King of Fighters '99 features them. The new Strikers are Kyo Kusanagi, Athena Asamiya, Goro Daimon, Billy Kane, Ryuji Yamazaki, Chizuru Kagura, Syo Kirishima, Alfred, Fiolina Germi, and Gai Tendo. Points won in Battle de Paradise can be transferred to The King of Fighters '99: Evolution to speed up the leveling process for the Extra Strikers.

EX Strikers have two attributes: good and evil, which the player can choose at the start of the game. The two attributes change their appearance, the content and options available during events, and the design of cards used. Depending on how the event unfolds, the attribute itself may change. Players start at level 1 and level up with the stars they obtain. There is a question mark on the EX Striker selection screen, and if the player meets certain conditions, they will be able to select the striker hidden behind the question mark.

A secret minigame, a remake of the 1979 SNK arcade game Yosaku, can be accessed by playing the game on an original Neo Geo Pocket model; this Easter egg is retained in the Neo Geo Pocket Color Selection re-release.

== Reception ==
Hardcore Gaming 101 said that that while the game could be labeled as a Mario Party focused on The King of Fighters based on similar gameplay, Japanese players played it more for the Dreamcast port of The King of Fighters '99 which was inaccessible in Western regions. As a result, the writer believes the game did not age well for modern gamers he believes there is not much to attract returning fans. NintendoLife says that the game requires too much reading of manuals to progress as well remembering information about SNK history that might divide players. Magazine gM welcomed the series's first sugoroku game especially since it was connected to the KOF '99 game and players can interact with others. In regards to the difficulty, the writer said the game creates elaborate schemes which can be seen as intense. There was praise for the variety as well as the inclusion of The King of Fighters characters who retain their original moves in the game.
