= SNK vs. Capcom: The Match of the Millennium =

1999 video game

- North American cover art
- Developer: SNK
- Publisher: SNK
- Series: SNK vs. Capcom
- Platforms: Neo Geo Pocket Color, Nintendo Switch, Windows
- Release: Neo Geo Pocket Color: JP: December 22, 1999; NA: December 1999; Nintendo Switch: WW: February 17, 2021; Windows: WW: September 30, 2021
- Genre: Fighting
- Modes: Single-player, multiplayer

SNK vs. Capcom: The Match of the Millennium (Note: Japanese: 頂上決戦最強ファイターズ ＳＮＫ ＶＳ．ＣＡＰＣＯＭ, Hepburn: Chōjō Kessen Saikyō Fighters SNK vs. Capcom; "Final Great Battle of the Strongest Fighters: SNK vs. Capcom") is a 1999 crossover fighting game developed and published by SNK for the Neo Geo Pocket Color in 1999.

== Gameplay ==
Game screenshot

Play options includes 2-fighter tag teams (like in the Marvel vs. Capcom series), 3-fighter queue teams (like in The King of Fighters series) and one-on-one. After that, the player can choose a Capcom-style level gauge (Average mode), an SNK-style charge gauge (Counter mode) or a 'neutral' meter that enhances super attacks if full (Rush mode, similar to the "Advanced" mode in The King of Fighters '97 and '98).

Every character also has a rival, whom they will fight between stages 4 and 5. The last two stages has the player fighting the tag team of Geese and Bison, then, depending what the side opposite to the player character's is and if the player's rival had been defeated beforehand, Orochi Iori or Evil Ryu. Only by reaching and clearing this final stage will the player's leading character's ending play; otherwise, a bad ending will be triggered. Upon clearing the game and achieving the character's true ending, a secret character unlock sequence will appear.

In Olympic mode, one can play themed minigames such as blasting Martians FPS-style (lifted from the final boss of Metal Slug 2) or helping Arthur from Ghosts 'n Goblins hop pits to snatch up treasure, as well as time-attack, first strike and survival events. The player's performance in these games awards special Versus points which can be used to unlock a special attack for each character or, via link-up, to unlock extra content in SNK vs. Capcom: Card Fighters' Clash and in The King of Fighters: Dream Match 1999 and Capcom vs. SNK: Millennium Fight 2000 for the Dreamcast.

=== Characters ===
The game features a total of 26 characters from SNK and Capcom. Some characters, including Jubei, Arthur, Marco and Fio only appear as part of the Olympic Mode mini-games. Others, such as Billy Kane and Vega, make non-playable appearances.

==== SNK characters ====
- Akari Ichijou
- Athena Asamiya
- Geese Howard
- Haohmaru
- Iori Yagami
- Kyo Kusanagi
- Leona
- Mai Shiranui
- Nakoruru
- Orochi Iori
- Ryo Sakazaki
- Terry Bogard
- Yuri Sakazaki

==== Capcom characters ====
- Akuma
- Baby Bonnie Hood
- Chun-Li
- Dan Hibiki
- Evil Ryu
- Felicia
- Guile
- Ken Masters
- M. Bison
- Morrigan Aensland
- Ryu
- Sakura Kasugano
- Zangief

== Development and release ==
The series was developed after former SNK director Takashi Nishiyama met with Capcom head of development Yoshiki Okamoto to work on a collaborative project between the two companies. The two met with SNK and Capcom presidents Eikichi Kawasaki and Kenzo Tsujimoto respectively, to convince them to cooperate with their rival company. Art director Toyohisa Tanabe suggested that the series was put in motion to help make games for the struggling Neo Geo Pocket Color, with SNK speaking with several companies in order to produce games for the system. This was also the first game in a collaborative SNK vs. Capcom series, resulting in several games and projects from both Capcom and SNK.

A port for Nintendo Switch was released on February 17, 2021, which was included as part of Neo Geo Pocket Color Selection Vol. 1 later that year. The Switch port adds local multiplayer and TV mode support for the first time. It was later ported to Windows on September 30, 2021.

== Reception ==
Reception

Aggregate score
Aggregator	Score
Metacritic	NS: 78/100; PC: 89/100

Review scores
Publication	Score
AllGame	4.5/5
Electronic Gaming Monthly	35.8 / 40
Famitsu	30 / 40
GameSpot	9.4 / 10
IGN	10 / 10
Video Games (DE)	5/5
Dreamzone	9.5 / 10
Game Vortex	100%
Pocket Gamer	A+
Pocket Videogames	5/5

The game received overall positive reviews.

On release, Famitsu magazine scored the game a 30 out of 40. IGN gave the game a perfect 10 out of 10 score on January 5, 2000. The Match of the Millennium was a nominee for "9th Annual GamePro Readers' Choice Awards" for "Best Handheld Game of The Year", but lost to Pokémon Yellow Version: Special Pikachu Edition for Game Boy.

In 2023, Time Extension identified SNK vs. Capcom: The Match of the Millennium as one of the best games for the NGPC.

The game sold 75,000 copies in Japan and is the overall best-selling game there for the Neo Geo Pocket (+Color) platform.
