= The King of Fighters XIII =

2010 video game

- Arcade flyer
- Developer: SNK Playmore (Note: The King of Fighters XIII: Global Match was co-developed by Bandai Namco Studios and Safari Games)
- Publishers: Original Version: JP: SNK Playmore; NA: Atlus; EU: Rising Star Games; Global Match: WW: SNK
- Director: Kei Yamamoto
- Producer: Masaaki Kukino
- Designers: Takamitsu Haze; Takahiro Kobayashi
- Series: The King of Fighters
- Platforms: Arcade; PlayStation 3; Xbox 360; iOS; Android; Microsoft Windows; PlayStation 4; Nintendo Switch
- Release: July 14, 2010: Arcade; JP: July 14, 2010 PlayStation 3 & Xbox 360; JP: December 1, 2011; NA: November 22, 2011; EU: November 25, 2011 iOS The King of Fighters-i; WW: July 7, 2011 The King of Fighters-i 2012; WW: May 3, 2012 Android The King of Fighters Android; WW: March 22, 2012 The King of Fighters-A 2012; WW: August 31, 2013 The King of Fighters XIII: Climax Arcade; JP: April 26, 2012 Microsoft Windows Steam Edition; WW: September 13, 2013 Galaxy Edition; WW: September 14, 2018 Global Match; WW: February 20, 2025 PlayStation 4 & Nintendo Switch Global Match; WW: November 16, 2023
- Genre: Fighting
- Modes: Single-player, multiplayer
- Arcade system: Taito Type X2

The King of Fighters XIII (Note: Japanese: ザ・キング・オブ・ファイターズ XIII, Hepburn: Za Kingu Obu Faitāzu Sātīn) is a 2010 fighting game developed and published by SNK Playmore for arcades. It is the thirteenth installment in the The King of Fighters series. It was ported to Xbox 360 and PlayStation 3 globally in 2011, and an updated version for arcades followed in 2012 subtitled Climax. The game is set after the events of The King of Fighters XI (2005) and is also the conclusion of Ash Crimson's story arc, which started in The King of Fighters 2003. It follows another King of Fighters tournament secretly hosted by Those From the Distance Land, the organization behind the events from the two prior games that are trying to break the seal of the demon Orochi and take its power.

The game was directed by Kei Yamamoto who wanted to bring elements from prior The King of Fighters titles and fix issues from the prior game. This title significantly modifies the gameplay from its predecessor, removing some modes, and adding ones formerly used in the series. It also expands the character roster, re-grouping the playable characters into three-member teams as in the prior installments. The ports are notable for including more content than the original version such as new characters, stages and game modes.

The game sold over 300,000 copies on its release year. Critical reception has been positive. Versions for iOS and Android had also been released, as well as a Windows port of Climax in 2013, and later a version with multiplayer rollback netcode subtitled Global Match in 2023 for Nintendo Switch and PlayStation 4 and 2025 for Steam. KOF XIII was succeeded by The King of Fighters XIV in 2016.

== Gameplay ==
A gameplay screenshot showing a fight in The King of Fighters XIII, featuring Maxima fighting against Elisabeth Blanctorche

The game removes some of the gameplay system features used in the prior game: the Guard Attack, the Critical Counter, the Clash System, as well as the dynamic, zooming camera. In their place, three new features have been added. The first of the three is the new EX Mode, which convert each character's super moves into more powerful versions that allows one bar from the player's power gauge for EX Special Moves and two bars from the player's power gauge for EX Super Special Moves. Another new feature is the Hyper Drive mode, which gives the player unlimited use of Drive Cancels for a while once the Hyper Drive Gauge has been maxed, and the last new feature confirmed for the game is the Drive Cancel, which opens up new combo possibilities. The game also marks the return of the multi-bar power gauge that was introduced in The King of Fighters '97.

In addition to standard and EX Desperation Moves, a new class of Desperation Move called Neo Max is included in the game and require that three stocks of gauge be exchanged to perform one, making it similar to Hidden Super Desperation Moves from The King of Fighters 2002 and Leader Super Special Moves from The King of Fighters 2003. These can also be cancelled from standard Desperation Moves, making them similar to the Dream Cancels from The King of Fighters XI.

The console version is based on the 1.1 update of The King of Fighters XIII arcade which fixed several issues from the original version. It also contains a story mode that is influenced by the player's actions with various perspectives being available. The mode is presented in visual novel style alongside fights, something considered to be hard to include in the arcade version by the SNK Playmore staff. Other modes shown are Arcade, Practice and Challenge. The online gameplay is based on the one included in later versions of The King of Fighters XII, which fixed the issues the initial one had.

== Plot ==
The game takes place five years after the events of The King of Fighters XI and is the last game of the third story arc that started in The King of Fighters 2003. The fighter Ash Crimson has absorbed the powers from two of the descendants of the clans who sealed the Orochi away 1,800 years ago, Chizuru Kagura and Iori Yagami, while Kyo Kusanagi is to be his last victim. As his former comrade, Elisabeth Blanctorche, prepares to stop him, fighters receive an invitation to another King of Fighters tournament hosted by a person labelled as "R". The tournament is sponsored by a woman Rose who is being controlled by "Those From The Past", the organization behind the two prior tournaments that has been trying to break Orochi's seal with Ash acting as their agent.

When the winning team reaches the game's end, Saiki, the leader of "Those From The Past" puts his work into motion. Saiki intends to use the energy expended by the winning team to enable him to cross time, killing his own subordinate just to face the champions. However, as the fight rages, Botan notes that the gate that links them to the past is starting to close despite the battle. Before Saiki can act, he is ambushed by Ash who kills him and who steals his power. It is revealed then that, while Ash was enlisted by Saiki to obtain the Three Sacred Treasures to power the time gate, Ash had no intention of helping Saiki. Ash is suddenly overtaken by Saiki's persona, facing the champions of the tournaments. Saiki is defeated in the gate but persists on crossing over to the past, believing it means nothing since he can return to the past and then cross the gate again to attempt his plan anew. However, Ash halts his attempt and allows the gate to close, leaving Saiki trapped in the present. With Ash being descendant of Saiki, he denies Saiki's existence in the past and forces his own existence to cease. As Ash vanishes from the living world, the flow of time resumes. In the epilogue of the Story Mode, Chizuru and Iori recovers their powers. The remaining members of Saiki's group leave. As it appears everybody forgets Ash's existence, Elisabeth remains emotionally destroyed as she still remembers their childhood.

== Characters ==
The roster of The King of Fighters XIII features all the characters who appeared in The King of Fighters XII, including the two console-exclusive characters, Elisabeth Branctorche and Mature. Three new characters come in the form of The King of Fighters '94 Women's Team (Yuri Sakazaki, King and Mai Shiranui). Unlike The King of Fighters XII, all of the characters are organized into proper teams this time with the exception of Ash, who is now a single entry character.

On April 22, 2010, Famitsu reported the addition of two new characters to the game: Vice for Iori Yagami's team and Takuma Sakazaki for the Art of Fighting team. The official website was soon updated with the changes as well as adding a storyline for Iori's team, and on the April 23, 2010 location test at Hong Kong, Hwa Jai from Fatal Fury: King of Fighters was confirmed to be in the game as the final member of Kim Kaphwan's team. Saiki, the manipulator behind the events of The King of Fighters XIII, appears as sub-boss in his awakened form, and an optional console exclusive mid-boss in his regular form, while an alternate form of Ash Crimson possessed by Saiki's soul known as Evil Ash appears as the final boss.

Billy Kane from Fatal Fury: King of Fighters as a console version exclusive character. The human form of Saiki was also announced to be playable, while the original flame-powered Iori Yagami to be featured as a downloadable content (DLC) EX form for regular flameless Iori. Following classic Iori's appearance, Atlus announced "NESTS Style Kyo", based mostly on Kyo Kusanagi's appearance and movesets in NESTS Chronicles games as a downloadable EX form for regular Kyo. As a result of a technical error, the patch was delayed to January 1, 2012, for the PlayStation 3. A new DLC including bugfixes (mainly on online mode) and Mr. Karate (Takuma Sakazaki's alter ego) as an EX form for Takuma became available on January 11, 2012.

Elisabeth Team

- Elisabeth Blanctorche
- Duo Lon
- Shen Woo

Japan Team

- Kyo Kusanagi
- Benimaru Nikaido
- Goro Daimon

Fatal Fury Team

- Terry Bogard
- Andy Bogard
- Joe Higashi

Art of Fighting Team

- Ryo Sakazaki
- Robert Garcia
- Takuma Sakazaki

Ikari Warriors Team

- Leona Heidern
- Ralf Jones
- Clark Still

Psycho Soldier Team

- Athena Asamiya
- Sie Kensou
- Chin Gentsai

Women Fighters Team

- King
- Mai Shiranui
- Yuri Sakazaki

Kim Team

- Kim Kaphwan
- Raiden
- Hwa Jai

Yagami Team

- Iori Yagami
- Mature
- Vice

K' Team

- K'
- Kula Diamond
- Maxima

Single Entry Mid-Bosses

- Ash Crimson
- Billy Kane (Note: Added in home version and later versions)
- Saiki (Note: Not included in mobile versions)

NPC Bosses

- Awakened Saiki (Sub-Boss)
- Evil Ash (Final Boss)

DLC EX Versions

- NESTS Saga Kyo
- Classic Iori
- Serious Mr. Karate

== Development ==
SNK Playmore announced The King of Fighters XIII in February 2010. There was a preview of the game that was held on March 25, 2010, in Akihabara. The game design director, Kei Yamamoto, stated that he wanted the game to be played by the fans of the series who would be able to use their experience from prior titles. Additionally, however, he did not want the game to be too similar to its predecessors, though he and his staff's aim for the game is to capture the charm from prior titles such as readdition of gameplay rules from older titles. The gameplay was also modified to have faster battles to be enjoyed by gamers. Yamamoto labelled the theme of the game as "KOF-ism" (KOFイズム). SNK Playmore president Ryo Mizufune commented that they wanted to release a game that would surpass fans' expectations and could become as popular as The King of Fighters '98. They listened to fans' suggestions during development of the game to incorporate them. The producer Masaaki Kukino debuted with The King of Fighters XII which was poorly received due to its lack of storyline and minor characters. As a result, SNK worked in order to make XIII end the story of Ash Crimson. Though the game was received favorably, SNK put the franchise on hiatus for several years. Nevertheless, the producer was satisfied with his work. Most of the characters were designed to look like their original personae like Athena Asamiya from Psycho Soldier or Ralf Jones and Clark Still from Ikari Warriors. Nevertheless, he lamented Geese Howard not making it into the game.

The staff in charge wanted to pay attention to the number of details given to the game's graphics. Regarding the story, they paid attention to its flow, mentioning the final version was not significantly different from the first one. Because the prior game, The King of Fighters XII, suffered from various technical issues, developers also worked in fixing them to improve the gameplay. However, the initial arcade version from the game suffered from four notable bugs which led to special rules forbidding players to use them in at Japan's Tougeki – Super Battle Opera fighting game tournament. An updated version 1.1 was later released for arcades, fixing all the bugs and issues from the original game. Yamamoto claimed they wanted to appeal to newcomers by offering several moves. The netcode received a major overhaul over players' response. Meanwhile, the fighting system relied on both common Desperation Moves and the new HD mode, with the latter created to appeal to new combos possibilities. In regards to the story, it is meant to end Ash Crimson's story arc which caught people's attention for how different was he as a protagonist when compared with previous leads as several gamers wondered about his antagonistic portrayal which remained as a mystery.

In choosing characters, developers wanted to include ones that would give a notable contrast and balance between teams rather than popularity within fans, expanding the "KOF-ism" theme. Characters like Kyo Kusanagi were made to fight at short distances rather than his original forms from the series' first two games where he relied in attacks performed from distance to emphasize the balance within the cast. The first Neo Max technique made by the staff was Kyo's. As a result, following Neo Max attacks were made to be consistent with Kyo's Neo Max in their style and damage. While Kyo often wears different outfits for story arc, he was given a more masculine appearance for The King of Fighters XIII. Artist Ogura expressed pressure in drawing this incarnation of Kyo as it had to live up to a long reputation he has had ever since his introduction. Yamamoto jokingly called Ash as a "show off". Since his introduction, Ash has been taking the three regalia of Japan guarded by Chizuru Kagura and Iori Yagami. This attacks resulted in SNK giving Ash the strongest techniques from his two victims.

Returning characters such as the K' Team were adjusted so that they would play in a similar fashion to prior titles, which resulted in several revisions of mechanics. K' in particular was influenced by his portrayal in Chinese comics where he often breaks his right hand glove which is often broken when he fails to control his flames. Ryo Sakazaki's style was noted to be similar to Robert Garcia and Takuma Sakazaki so the designer aimed to make him more unique so his moves were finalized without difficulty. King and Mai Shiranui were made based on their Art of Fighting and Fatal Fury incarnations, respectively, rather than their The King of Fighters ones. Meanwhile, Yuri's redesign gave the staff a good impression in how she her sprites changed, especially liking the universal lower body due to her combination of white gi and blue pants. Ogura stated that designing Ash's final form was conceived shortly after he saw early designs of Saiki. Following this, Ogura tried drawing Ash's possessed form from The King of Fighters XIII where he was careful in showing that while the enemy's body is Ash's, the one fighting is Saiki as represented by his black flames. Despite early pressure about that, once seeing Saiki's similarities with Ash, Ogura managed to draw the Evil Ash easily. The idea behind this character was giving an vibe of a repulsive person.

SNK Playmore worked in order to make him balanced as they aimed for a neither superior Kyo or an inferior Kyo within the cast, giving the players their decision when choosing which version of the character would they prefer. Iori's flamewielding persona was developed to generate a contrast between him and the regular Iori. Another DLC is the original Iori Yagami who can wield flames for his fighting style. Despite being the same person, the playstyle of Iori's flames is highly different from the regular Iori whose attacks involve hand-to-hand combat. Nevertheless, he was balanced by SNK in order to avoid making the character be overpowered when exploring his special moves.

== Releases ==
In June 2011, SNK Playmore confirmed that the PlayStation 3 and Xbox 360 console versions were in the works and would be released on October 27, 2011, in Japan. In September 2011, however, SNK Playmore delayed the game's release date to an unspecified one from the same year, later leaving it to December 1, 2011. The ports add several game modes not seen in the original version as well as new characters. Atlus had confirmed that they would publish the game on October 25, 2011, in North America, but later delayed it until November 22. Pre-orders for the game included a four-CD soundtrack from the series; the preorders notably increased following the announcement. Rising Star Games confirmed the release date at October 28, 2011 in Europe. While the Xbox 360 cover focuses on Ash Crimson due to his role in the story, Ogura did a different artwork for the PS3 release, featuring the more familiar characters.

Various new arenas were added for the home version, with some of them being originally from the Art of Fighting and Fatal Fury series. The others are based on places briefly seen in cutscenes from The King of Fighters. All of the characters had their movesets adjusted for better balance as a response to issues found in the arcade versions. Downloadable content was also made available, including variants of existing characters.

An iOS version was also released on July 7, 2011, under the title of The King of Fighters-i. It was also brought to Android-based devices on March 22, 2012, as The King of Fighters Android. Kei Yamamoto was also in charge of this version, but the development team consisted of another one that did not work on the arcade version. The staff had trouble adapting the game to iOS due to lack of balances of moves and enemies' intelligences. The initial roster was reduced although six more characters became available by September 2011 alongside an updated version. Billy Kane was included as a result of his popularity within fans, although some were confused by the absence of Iori Yagami. Depending on the game's popularity, the staff may port it to other consoles. The King of Fighters-i 2012, an updated version featuring 12 new characters and other modes, was released for the iOS platform on May 3, 2012 and on Android as The King of Fighters-A 2012 on August 31, 2012. Though all EX DLC form characters are also downloadable in these mobile versions, Mr. Karate and a human form of Saiki, who are still console-exclusive characters, are not included.

A new arcade version of the game, titled The King of Fighters XIII: Climax, was announced in February 2012. It added the characters introduced on the console version and featured additional rebalancing. Location tests began that same month. Climax was officially released in Japanese arcades on April 26, 2012. A Windows port including all three DLC characters called The King of Fighters XIII Steam Edition, was released on Steam in September 2013. This port is based on the Climax release for arcades. A Galaxy Edition also based on the Climax release was released on GOG.com on September 14, 2018.

The King of Fighters XIII: Global Match, a version of the game with rollback netcode, was announced at Evo Japan 2023 for PlayStation 4 and Nintendo Switch. Three open beta tests took place throughout 2023 and the game was released on consoles on November 16, 2023. On PC, unlike previous rollback netcode upgrades by developer Iron Galaxy, Global Match was ported by Safari Games and announced as a separate purchase with Steam Edition being delisted shortly after its February 20, 2025 release. This was met with player backlash which was further exacerbated post-release after Global Match launch issues on PC. This prompted SNK to issue a statement promising fixes.

An official guidebook from the series was published by Arcadia in Japan on August 6, 2010, as The King of Fighters XIII Master Guide. An official soundtrack was released on August 4, 2010. It is composed of two CDs, with the first one having 15 tracks and the second 37, most if which are endings and jingles. A four-CD official soundtrack The King of Soundtracks was included with the English pre-orders of the game.

== Reception ==
Reception

Aggregate score
| Aggregator | Score |
|---|---|
| Metacritic | iOS: 82/100; PS3: 77/100; X360: 79/100 iOS (2012): 88/100; PC: 77/100 |

Review scores
| Publication | Score |
|---|---|
| 1Up.com | B |
| Eurogamer | 8/10 |
| Famitsu | 34/40 |
| GamePro | 4.5/5 |
| GameSpot | 8.5/10.0 |
| IGN | 7.0/10.0 |
| TouchArcade | iOS: 5/5 iOS (2012): 5/5 |

Award
| Publication | Award |
|---|---|
| GameSpot | Best Fighting Game of 2011; Most Improved Sequel of 2011 |

Following its release, The King of Fighters XIII received positive reviews, taking an average of 77 and 79 out of 100 on Metacritic. GameSpot awarded it as Best Fighting Game of the Year and as the Most Improved Sequel. It also received nominations for the Spike Video Game Awards, Golden Joystick Awards and AIAS' Interactive Achievement Awards for the best fighting game of the year, but every time lost to Mortal Kombat.

The gameplay was given major praise with critics from GameSpot and 1UP.com comparing it with critically acclaimed fighting games like Street Fighter IV and finding the execution satisfying despite possible difficulties to newcomers to the franchise. IGN praised the improvements on the fighting system but still felt that players need to get used to it, with Eurogamer praising the inclusion of a training mode which teaches the player how to execute the new system. The visual presentation was complimented to the point GamePro stated that the game "has an incredibly distinct – and incredibly beautiful – visual style to it." SNK Playmore was noted to have listened to all the fans' concerns regarding the game as the character roster was increased, with the notable return of fan favorite characters. Eurogamer agreed in regards to the new characters, but criticized the new boss Saiki for how overpowered he is all of his forms.

On the other hand, the game has received criticism as a result of its story mode which is nearly inaccessible to those unfamiliar with the series as well as its use of illustrations alongside large paragraphs telling the plot. Similar comments were given to the online modes as it lacked options to allow players to watch other online fights. Eurogamer still praised SNK's desire to tell a story arc more than previous installments. GamePro praised SNK's dedication to expand the story but lamented there was little voice acting as the cutscenes still rely on silent lines. Nevertheless, the same site praised the notable visual improvements making the characters "look like paintings", with 1UP.com comparing them to Street Fighter III: Third Strike. The inclusion of DLC was well received by Electronic Gaming Monthly and Level Up for the decision to bring back the classic fighting styles Kyo Kusanagi and Iori Yagami had in previous installments.

The iOS port received a perfect score by TouchArcade praising its large amount of characters and responsive controls it has. Pocket Gamer also shared positive comments about the port, praising the visuals and learning guides but lamented that SNK did not improve on the original visuals. Global Match was praised by the media for retaining the DLC characters for free but criticized for the lack of balancing in the cast with Kim and Takuma being too overpowered. However, the rollback and other content was well received.

The PlayStation 3 version of the game sold 21,525 copies in Japan during its first week of release. By 2011, the game reached a total of 300,000 copies sold.

At the game's (and the series') Evolution Championship Series debut in 2012, it became the second-most-watched game of the series at over 90,000 consecutive viewers, thanks to a highly competitive tournament. In 2012, Complex ranked it as the third best SNK fighting game ever made, calling it "one of this generation’s finest fighters." The magazine also ranked it as the eighth best 2D fighting game of all time in 2013, stating: "A hit at EVO both this year, and the last, we predict that XIII will be sticking around for years to come." GamesRadar listed it as the 8th best fighting from its generation. ONE37pm listed Climax it as the 17th best SNK game due to the major improvements it has over the original KOFXIII as well as how appealing the 2D game was in an era filled with 3D graphics. PCMag regarded it as one of the best fighting games from 2024.

Despite the positive response The King of Fighters XIII received, SNK put the series on a hiatus for several years until Yasuyuki Oda returned to SNK to develop The King of Fighters XIV in 2016.
