= Athena (video game) =

1986 video game

- Game flyer
- Developers: SNK; Micronics (FC/NES)
- Publisher: SNK
- Designer: Koji Obata
- Artist: Rampty
- Platforms: Arcade, Commodore 64, Famicom/NES, ZX Spectrum
- Release: Arcade: JP: July 1986; Famicom/NES: JP: June 5, 1987; NA: August 1987
- Genre: Platform
- Mode: Single-player

Athena (Note: Japanese: アテナ, Hepburn: Atena) is a 1986 platform video game developed and published by SNK for arcades. Ports were later released for the NES console and ZX Spectrum and Commodore 64 home computers.

The game's protagonist, Princess Athena, has gone on to appear in later fighting games by SNK as a secret character or assistant to her descendant Athena Asamiya, a prominent character in SNK's titles.

== Plot ==
Athena is the princess of the heavenly Kingdom of Victory. Seeking adventure beyond her monotonous life in the palace, she opens the "Door Which Shouldn't Be Opened" in the basement of Castle Victory, which is said to lead to a dangerous realm. After passing through the doorway, she falls into another world known as Fantasy World, which is ruled by the evil Emperor Dante. After losing her dress during the fall, Athena begins her journey in a wilderness inhabited by beast-like warriors and other dangers. She must fight to survive, defeat Dante, overcome the challenges she encounters, and find a way back to her own kingdom.

After Athena defeats Dante, it all begins anew in the sequel, Athena: Full Throttle (Japanese: アテナフルスロットル), in which the princess, again bored, opens the "Door Which Shouldn't Be Opened B", disregarding her loyal maid Helene's advice, and they both fall to Elysium World, where they face off against other villains.

Many of the game's elements are inspired by Greek mythology or ancient Roman culture such as weapons, equipment, items and enemy designs, while Princess Athena herself is named after the Greek goddess Athena.

== Gameplay ==
Athena navigates the Cave level.

Upon landing, unarmed and nearly nude, the princess only has her kicks to fend off the approaching monsters, but she may collect the dead enemies's various weapons and also has the chance to find shields, headgear and armor to cover her body, although these will be lost after withstanding some attacks. Her journey requires leaping and climbing as well as fighting through the land's eight hazardous worlds, each leading up to an oversized enemy that must be dealt with before proceeding to the next area. The use of certain weapons such as a hammer allows Athena to break through stone blocks, sometimes revealing not only armor but magic items such as Mercury's sandals that, when worn, allow her to make great leaps.

The game features certain role-playing video game elements to complement the platform action. Princess Athena has to defeat enemies such as the final boss by using various mythological weapons, items and equipment. Without some items, she cannot make it through the adventure.

== Ports ==
Athena was later converted for the NES by Micronics. Conversions were also done for the ZX Spectrum and Commodore 64 in 1987 by Ocean Software and released under their Imagine label.

The NES version was only released for North American homes until the PlayStation Network saw a release of the arcade original in 2011. Both the arcade and NES versions of Athena are eventually included in SNK 40th Anniversary Collection, released for the Nintendo Switch in 2018, and then in 2019 for the PlayStation 4, Windows, and Xbox One.

Hamster Corporation released the game as part of their Arcade Archives series for the Nintendo Switch and PlayStation 4 in 2018.

== Reception ==
Reception

Award
Publication	Award
Your Sinclair	Megagame

In Japan, Game Machine listed Athena on their September 1, 1986, issue as being the ninth most-successful table arcade unit of the month.

== Analysis ==
Athena has been described as one of the first cases where a video game received a playable female character.

== Legacy ==
=== Sequels ===
A sequel, Psycho Soldier, was released in the arcades in 1987. Another sequel, Athena: Awakening from the Ordinary Life, was released for the PlayStation in 1999. Two mobile games were released in 2006: Athena: Full Throttle and Athena On Stage.

== See also ==
- SNK vs. Capcom (series)
