= Athena Asamiya =

Fictional character from Psycho Soldier and The King of Fighters

- Athena and The King of Fighters character
- Athena Asamiya in The King of Fighters XV by Tomohiro Nakata
- First appearance: Psycho Soldier (1987)
- Portrayed by: Kei Ishibashi (Athena)
- Voiced by: Japanese: Rushina (Psycho Soldier); Reiko Fukui (The King of Fighters '94); Moe Nagasaki (The King of Fighters '95); Tamao Satō (The King of Fighters '96); Yukina Kurisu (The King of Fighters '97, The King of Fighters: Kyo); Haruna Ikezawa (The King of Fighters '98 onwards)

In-universe information
- Fighting style: Psycho-based power and Chinese martial arts
- Origin: Japan
- Nationality: Japanese

Athena Asamiya (Japanese: 麻宮 アテナ, Hepburn: Asamiya Atena) is a character originally from SNK's 1987 video game Psycho Soldier. An esper, Athena is a descendant of Princess Athena from the earlier Athena game. She later appears in The King of Fighters series of fighting games as a member of the Psycho Soldier Team alongside her friend Sie Kensou and her teacher Chin Gentsai. While there have been changes to the team, Athena has been consistently playable in the main series. She was also given her own video game Athena: Awakening from the Ordinary Life, which was only released in Japanese regions for the PlayStation in 1999.

Athena was designed with idea of having an appealing main character in Psycho Soldier. The use of a character song and multiple outfits resulted in major praise by publications for video games and the character also received generally positive reception.

== Creation and design ==
Athena Asamiya is based on the title character from SNK's video game Athena. Athena has long purple hair and wears a black Japanese school uniform. In order to generate contrast between the two Athenas, Psycho Soldier's was designed to look more mature. The original Princess Athena was voiced by Haruna Anno. The actress noted the character had a distinctive sex appeal based on her skimpy appearance and the details of her facial expressions. Her first encounter with the game was in an advertisement for Athena in a game magazine. Her expression and swimsuit shot straight through attracted Haruna. Haruna was obsessed with collecting merchandise, and got involved with the series. She was delighted to cosplay as Athena and cosplay as her in the SNK booth.

In retrospective, character designer Eisuke Ogura felt Athena's marketing as an idol was ahead of its time, citing things such as her songs and anime-like illustrations. The fact that Athena changed outfits in every game felt like something that Ogura believed would appeal to the demographic. For The King of Fighters '94, there was pressure within staff about including the character. The staff worked so much on her that other developers accused them of favoritism. Feeling pressure with how Western players would react to her high school look, SNK instead decided to design her wearing a different outfit which is first seen in her character's introduction when removing her high school look.

Athena wears new outfits in every game, some with little changes. Her hair, however, is purple and becomes short from The King of Fighters '99 to The King of Fighters 2001, and regardless of her outfit, one item that remains relatively unchanged is the tiara she wears on her hair, with accompanying star-shaped hairpins. The staff from the series has been requested by fans to return her Japanese school uniform in several games, but they only made her wear it only in her introductions as they thought it would not be well received by gamers from other countries. In the Maximum Impact series, her normal costume (from The King of Fighters '98) as the basis for it, it is piece of "cute clothing that she has per her heart and soul into". On the other hand, her "Another" is a "school wear" outfit with glasses according to the staff.

However, by The King of Fighters XI, Athena appears with a white school uniform and in The King of Fighters XII she returns to her original Psycho Soldier outfit as the members from SNK wanted to return The King of Fighters series to its "original concept". In The King of Fighters XIII, Athena returns wearing the same clothes but with a color alteration (white shirt and blue skirt; more in line with her attire from The King of Fighters XI). Eisuke Ogura was given multiple directions by the game staff in how Athena should look such as her facial expressions and limbs. Director Kei Yamamoto explained many of Athena's mechanics are based on psychic moves with Psycho Ball (サイコボール, Saiko Bōru) being one of her most famous ones. Yamamoto explained that the XIII staff worked to produce balanced variations of her attacks. Her strongest move in that game, the Psycho Medley 13 (サイコメドレー13, Saiko Medorē 13) brought multiple difficulties to the team but in the end SNK were satisfied with the result. When making The King of Fighters XIV with the Unreal Engine, the original game had more realistic visuals but clashed with character models Athena's and Kula Diamond's models that have been compared with anime-like series so they opted for the current look. The character was redesigned by Keisuke Ogura rather than veteran Nobuyuki Kuroki in order to appeal to newcomers. Sound director Asakana found Athena as a character who remained faithful to previous incarnations to the point the staff had fun designing her. According to SNK, Athena's appearance from The King of Fighters '98 remains as the most popular within the fanbase which led to her inclusion in XIV as downloadable content. The King of Fighters XV once again changes the character's hair to short and makes emphasis on her traditional "Kenpo practitioner clothing" according to Tomohiro Nakata.

For the spin-off SNK Heroines: Tag Team Frenzy, Athena was given a magical girl-like outfit that would also fit her characterization. Multiple accessories were then added in order to appeal to a young demographic to the point of making her look like a main character. Bracelets were meant to look like morphing accessories on a comical note. Ogura wanted to give her a staff but the idea was rejected by the team. Nevertheless, the main theme of the game was that the cast would wear an outfit they would not like. Yasuyuki Oda stated it was difficult how to perform Athena's 3D models and yet making it look like her original 2D model.

Athena has been voiced by several voice actresses since her debut in Psycho Soldier in which she was played by Rushina in the game and Kaori Shimizu for her image songs. For The King of Fighters series, Athena has been played by several actresses. Reiko Fukui voiced her in The King of Fighters '94, Moe Nagasaki in The King of Fighters '95, Tamao Satō in The King of Fighters '96 and Yukina Kurisu in The King of Fighters '97 and The King of Fighters: Kyo. Since The King of Fighters '98, Athena has been voiced by Haruna Ikezawa in each game she is featured as well as the anime The King of Fighters: Another Day and The King of Fighters: Destiny.

== Appearances ==
Athena's design changes with every new installment of The King of Fighters

=== In video games ===
Athena first appears in the video game Psycho Soldier, fighting against several creatures attacking Earth along with her friend Sie Kensou. She would also appear in the crossover fighting game series The King of Fighters as part of the Psycho Soldier Team. The Psycho Soldier Team is initially composed of Kensou and Athena's teacher, Chin Gentsai. The team would be present in most King of Fighters tournament as Chin wanted to train more Kensou and Athena as well as searching for evil forces such as the demon Orochi. The team has little changes within tournaments with the only new member joining them being Bao from The King of Fighters '99 until The King of Fighters 2001. The King of Fighters '99: Evolution also contains a Striker version from Athena with her school uniform. By The King of Fighters 2003, the Psycho Soldier Team retires from competition as Kensou and Bao needed to train their new powers. As such, Athena second another variant of Heroine Fighters Team known as the High School Girls Team along with the Sumo fighter Hinako Shijo, who had been part of the Women Fighters Team in the previous two tournaments, and a mysterious girl named Malin. The Psycho Soldier Team returns in The King of Fighters XI with Athena, Kensou and Momoko, a young girl able to use Psychic powers. In The King of Fighters XII, Athena is playable, but like each character, she has no official teams, due to its beta state. In sequel, a finalized version of The King of Fighters XII, The King of Fighters XIII, she is back with Kensou and Chin representing the Psycho Soldiers; she and reappear in The King of Fighters XIV. In The King of Fighters XV, Athena joins Mai and Yuri to form a new super version of Heroine Fighters Team, as foreshadowed by her conversations with one of the Women Fighters’ team members in two games prior, and most likely an exchange request between her and original Women Fighters leader King, who re-joins Art of Fighting team.

She is also featured in the spin-off games The King of Fighters: Battle de Paradise, The King of Fighters Neowave, KOF: Maximum Impact 1 and 2, and KOF ALL STARS. In the Maximum Impact series, Athena has a self-proclaimed rival named Mignon Beart whom she does not acknowledge or know her. Athena also appears in the spin-off video games The King of Fighters R-1 and The King of Fighters R-2 as part of the Heroine Team with Mai Shiranui and Yuri Sakazaki and in the sequel with Kazumi and Yuri once again. She is also present in the role-playing game The King of Fighters: Kyo where she and Kensou travel to Japan to meet Kyo Kusanagi, befriending Kyo's girlfriend, Yuki, in the process. The two can also be recruited for Kyo's team in the 1997 tournament. Athena, Kensou and Bao are also present in two Game Boy Advance games The King of Fighters EX: Neo Blood and The King of Fighters EX2: Howling Blood. Other two scrolling shooters, KOF: Sky Stage and Neo Geo Heroes: Ultimate Shooting, feature her as a playable character, while the role-playing game for mobile phones The King of Fighters '98: Online had her as part of the cast.

In the 3D adventure game Athena: Awakening from the Ordinary Life, Athena has to find answers about strange things that happened in her school, and later in various parts of Japan related with her psychic powers. She was also added to the crossover series SNK vs. Capcom, being playable in SNK vs. Capcom: The Match of the Millennium and Capcom vs. SNK 2. Her character also appears in SNK Gals' Fighters as a playable character, with Athena wanting to win the Gals' tournament to recover her long hair, while in SNK Heroines: Tag Team Frenzy she is trapped in a new tournament. Athena appears also in the dating game series Days of Memories, in which each game is presented with different personalities (and even with different ages). She is also present in Metal Slug Defense, Brave Frontier and The Rhythm of Fighters. Besides spin-offs, Athena has been the main character of the mobile phone game Athena on Stage. She also appears in Super Smash Bros. Ultimate as a Spirit as well as a cameo in the King of Fighters Stadium stage.

=== In other media ===
Athena also appears in several comic adaptations from The King of Fighters series which retell the story from various video games. In Masato Natsumoto's manga The King of Fighters: Kyo, Athena has a crush on Kyo Kusanagi, being also interested in his abilities. She appears in several chapters from the series along with Kensou as they investigate the powers from Iori Yagami. In the manga from Ryo Takamisaki, The King of Fighters G, Athena is featured as one of the lead characters participating in The King of Fighters '96 tournament along with Kyo and Mature, a servant from the demon Orochi. She also makes a short appearance in the 2006 original net animation The King of Fighters: Another Day helping citizens from Southtown in a fire. In the live-action drama entitled Athena, her character is portrayed by Kei Ishibashi, while the story is based on the video game Athena: Awakening from the Ordinary Life. Athena also has her own CD soundtrack named Athena the Music (アテナ ザ ミュージック) as part of the 20th anniversary from the video games of Athena. The CD was published by Happinet and contains various tracks based on Athena's character. In the web series The King of Fighters: Destiny Athena faces Rugal Bernstein alongside other fighters during the climax but is defeated.

== Promotion and reception ==
Her character is also featured in various types of merchandising such as figurines from KOF: Maximum Impact and SNK Beach Volley. Athena was also featured along with Mai Shiranui as a part of a set of two action figures with both her character being chibi. A key-chain from her character was also released by SNK.

In the book Women in Classical Video Games, Athena is said to have reflect the 1980s popularity of magical battle school girls in fiction and teenage pop-idols in general. Athena was compared with the characters from Valis: The Fantasm Soldier for relying on high school students and superpowers. The character's inclusion in The King of Fighters was noted to further improve her popularity in gaming with The King of Fighters XIII bringing back elements from her original game. Athena was said to be one of the first multi-game female mascot years before Lara Croft and Sophitia showing early signs of Japanese developers aiming to give her elements of the West as reflect in her connection to Greek mythology.

Athena Asamiya has received generally positive reception, with authors Brian Ashcraft and Shoko Ueda describing her as "one of the pioneering female video game action stars." The character of Athena has been popular within gamers, ranking highly on character popularity polls. In the character popularity poll on Neo Geo Freak's website in 2000, she was voted as the tenth favorite character with a total of 1,020 votes. In 2018, Athena was voted as the eighth most popular Neo Geo character. Japanese magazine Gamest ranked Athena at No. 3 in the list of Top 50 Characters of 1994. Her redesign in The King of Fighters XII received mixed reception. Some fans called this incarnation chubby, though GameSpot writer Hirohiko Niizumi disagreed. Anime News Network criticized it for being a "squat moe munchkin she retrogressed" in both XII and XIII' and thus praised her redesign for the spin-off The Rhythm of Fighters.

Author Róisín Lally discussed how Athena Asamiya's design and character, which she describes as an "early adolescent child," contrasts the goddess Athena's, as well as the difference between "alive" art and "representational" art. She discussed how Asamiya's design is a "snapshot representation of the sexualization of young girls," and that it "feed(s) the lower part of the intellectual faculty." Capcom said they the sailor uniform she wore in her debut scene in KOF which parallels Sakura Kasugano from Street Fighter. Aoi Nishimata's work as Sakura made both characters stand out also in the moe factor which led to the developers for these characters interact again. In retrospect, both Athena and Sakura were found similar due to their designs and age mismatched for the fighting genre, made a striking debut in the mid-1990s. There was a slight anxiety as to whether these frail and weak girls would be able to fight against strong fighters, perhaps due to the influence of Sailor Moon, which was creating a boom at the time. A decade after their debut, Athena's bold image change with her costumes and hairstyles has given her amusement, while Sakura's sense of security as an eternal high school girl has built up a history of their own "good points." Things that change and things that don't. Although their directions are completely different, both heroines are supported by many fans, and even today continue to shine as active poster girls, appearing in simulation games and puzzle games.
