= Psycho Soldier =

1987 video game

- Developer: SNK
- Publisher: SNK
- Platforms: Arcade, Commodore 64, ZX Spectrum, Amstrad CPC
- Release: JP: March 3, 1987; NA: 1987
- Genre: Platform
- Modes: Single-player, multiplayer

Psycho Soldier (Note: Japanese: サイコ・ソルジャー, Hepburn: Saiko Sorujā) is a 1987 platform video game developed and published by SNK for arcades. It is a distant sequel to Athena. Ocean Software on their Imagine label released home computer versions of the game for the ZX Spectrum, Commodore 64 and Amstrad in 1987. It is the first appearance of Athena Asamiya, a descendant of the original Athena, who would be more well known for her appearances in The King of Fighters series of games.

== Gameplay ==
Gameplay screenshot

Psycho Soldier is an action sidescroller. Rocks and other destructible objects sometimes hold power-ups. Players utilize a special force known as "Psycho Energy" to perform a number of attacks, including creating a shield of rotating spheres around the character's body to protect them. The amount of Psycho Energy is measured by the energy bar located to the left of the player's available spheres, and can be increased by obtaining certain items. Players can launch the spheres out at enemies and destructible objects at the cost of using one. Depending on how much energy the player has, the spheres may produce a different result when used, such as bouncing around the screen or, when at max energy and swirling at a higher speed around the player, spreading out and destroy everything in their wake at the cost of some power.

Both Athena and Kensou share the same abilities, and whichever one the player chooses has no real bearing on the difficulty of the game. If the player fills their energy bar and collects a special item resembling a green egg, their character transforms into a "Psycho Creature", in Athena's case a phoenix and for Kensou a green dragon. The psycho creatures have a powerful fire breath attack that hits enemies in front of them and a move which rams them into a single nearby enemy. The transformations last until the boss of the stage is defeated or until the player runs out of energy from taking too many hits.

== Plot ==
Psycho Soldier takes place many years after Athena. In Athena, the title character is a mystical figure loosely based on the goddess of Greek mythology who fights her way through several otherworldly lands in order to destroy various monsters and evil beings who threaten the peace of the land. After her journey is complete, she returns to heaven, only to fade completely from the minds of the mortals who live below.

In the modern times of Psycho Soldier, a young girl named Athena Asamiya, who is the descendant of the original Athena, displays special psychic abilities that allow her to unlock a number of hidden powers within herself, and hopes to one day use these skills not only to help others, but to advance her stage career as a future pop idol. Several evil beings appear in her hometown in Japan, and along with her friend and fellow gifted psychic Sie Kensou, she uses her talents to protect her friends and home from this new menace.

== Reception ==
Reception

Review scores
Publication	Score
Crash	69%, 75%
Your Sinclair	8/10 (ZX Spectrum)

In Japan, Game Machine listed Psycho Soldier on their April 15, 1987 issue as being the seventh most-successful table arcade unit of the month.

The ZX Spectrum version was published in 1987 by Imagine Software, and was converted by Ross Harris (as Source Software). This port received moderate critical success. Your Sinclair awarded it 8 out of 10, praising the smooth sprite movement and well-tried formula gameplay, but lamenting the monochrome graphics and weak sound effects. CRASH awarded it 69% and 75%, one reviewer criticising the boring gameplay and Athena's slow reactions.

== Legacy ==
Both Athena and Sie Kensou were also noted for being one of the first video game characters to have their own theme songs (which The King of Fighters would remix multiple times across its titles).
