= SNK vs. Capcom: Card Fighters =

Digital collectible card game based on video games by Capcom and SNK

- Genre: Collectible card game
- Developers: SNK; Now Production
- Publishers: SNK; SNK Playmore
- Platforms: Neo Geo Pocket Color; Nintendo DS
- First release: SNK vs. Capcom: Card Fighters Clash; October 21, 1999
- Latest release: SNK vs. Capcom: Card Fighters DS; December 14, 2006
- Parent series: SNK vs. Capcom

SNK vs. Capcom: Card Fighters is a series of SNK Playmore games released between 1999 and 2006 for hand-held consoles. They are digital collectible card games, spun off from the popular SNK vs. Capcom series of fighting games. The games features cards based on characters from a variety of different Capcom and SNK games, such as Street Fighter and The King of Fighters. The first two entries were released for the Neo Geo Pocket Color, followed by a third game for the Nintendo DS.

== SNK vs. Capcom: Card Fighters' Clash ==
SNK vs. Capcom: Card Fighters Clash
- North American cover art for the SNK version
- Developer: SNK
- Publisher: SNK
- Platforms: Neo Geo Pocket Color, Nintendo Switch
- Release: October 21, 1999: Neo Geo Pocket Color; JP: October 21, 1999; NA: December 1999; EU: 1999 Nintendo Switch; WW: January 12, 2022
- Genre: Collectible card game
- Modes: Single-player, multiplayer

The first game in the series, released in 1999 for the Neo Geo Pocket Color handheld console, was the first crossover between SNK and Capcom. Characters in the game are illustrated in the super deformed art style. There are two complementary versions of the game: the SNK version and the Capcom version. Each version of the game has a different starting deck and different exclusive cards that can be obtained, but the gameplay remains the same, with card battles resembling a somewhat simplified version of Magic: The Gathering, in which a maximum of three "creatures" (i.e. fighters) are allowed in each player's field at any given moment and there is no mana to be spent to place them in the field (there are, however, Special Points, SP for short, which are gained as fighters are placed in the field and spent as the players use Action Cards—this game's equivalent of Enchantments—or combined attacks). The game received an emulated re-release for Nintendo Switch in January 2022, which includes both versions and features the ability to battle and trade between them on a single system. This re-release was later included as part of the Neo Geo Pocket Color Selection Vol. 2 game compilation, released for Nintendo Switch and Windows in November 2022.

=== Reception ===
Reception

Aggregate score
Aggregator	Score
Metacritic	84/100

Review scores
Publication	Score
Gamezebo	90%
TouchArcade	100%

The game was mostly well received. TouchArcade said "It's one of those games that gives back the more you put into it." Gamezebo said "Overall Card Fighters' Clash holds up very well to modern scrutiny – like most of the top tier NGPC titles – and this sensibly priced port is a must play for anyone with even a passing interest in the card battler genre."

== SNK vs. Capcom: Card Fighters 2 Expand Edition ==
SNK vs. Capcom: Card Fighters 2 Expand Edition
- Developer: SNK
- Publisher: SNK
- Platform: Neo Geo Pocket Color
- Release: JP: September 13, 2001
- Genre: Collectible card game
- Modes: Single-player, multiplayer

This Japan-only sequel to SVC: Card Fighters' Clash was released as カードファイターズ2 in 2001 for the Neo Geo Pocket Color after Capcom vs. SNK 2. In addition to the 240 character and 60 action cards from the first game, 124 new cards are added, adding cast from Garou: Mark of the Wolves, Samurai Shodown: Warriors Rage, The King of Fighters '99 and 2000 for SNK, and Project Justice, Mega Man Legends, Dino Crisis and Onimusha for Capcom, while also including 40 Reaction cards that can be used during the opponent's attack. Another new feature is special character cards with alternate versions of various characters depicted with regular artwork instead of the super deformed style. Instead of being released as two versions (SNK and Capcom), this game was released as a single version that lets the players decide to either start with a SNK deck or a Capcom deck. It was the last game to be released for the Neo Geo Pocket Color in Japan. A fan translation for the game exists.

== SNK vs. Capcom: Card Fighters DS ==
SNK vs. Capcom: Card Fighters DS
- North American cover art
- Developer: Now Production
- Publishers: WW: SNK Playmore; EU: Ignition Entertainment
- Director: Junichi Ōno
- Producer: Tatsuhiko Kanaoka
- Platform: Nintendo DS
- Release: JP: December 14, 2006; NA: April 24, 2007
- Genre: Collectible card game
- Modes: Single player, multiplayer

=== Release ===
This Nintendo DS game was released on December 14, 2006, in Japan and was released on April 24, 2007, in the United States. In addition, there are key features:

- ADK characters were added to the SNK side, from games like Aggressors of Dark Kombat, Ninja Master's -Haoh-Ninpo-Cho- and the World Heroes series.
- Many newcomers have been added from recent games produced by both companies, such as Capcom's Dante and Phoenix Wright as well as SNK's Yuki and Nagase.
- Power Stone characters are absent from the game.

=== Game-breaking bug ===
Almost immediately after the American NDS version was released, an unavoidable bug was discovered in the game. The bug occurs on the ninth floor of the tower, during the second play through. The game crashes after talking to an opponent named Jon, who has to be defeated in order to finish the game. On June 6, SNK announced that the replacement cartridge would be available in stores on June 25 and began the process of implementing a recall. These cartridges have been sent by mail along with a package of five King of Fighters trading cards. The recall ended in January 2008. Fixed versions of the game features a black and white graphic behind the title font on the cartridge's label, while bugged versions feature the label in full color. The other versions of the game did not contain the aforementioned glitch.

=== Reception ===
Reception

Aggregate score
Aggregator	Score
Metacritic	48/100

Review scores
Publication	Score
Eurogamer	10%
Game Informer	65%
GameRevolution	16%
GameSpot	49%
GameSpy	30%
GamesRadar+	50%
GamesTM	60%
GameZone	63%
IGN	35%
NGamer	57%
Nintendo Power	70%

The game was mostly poorly received. Eurogamer said it was "broken in the literal sense of not working as sold and, as such, must be scored appropriately. That the game underneath the bodged localisation is also, figuratively, a broken shell of what it once was and absolutely nowhere near as good as it should have been, is more than anything, deeply, deeply sad." IGN said it was "Without a doubt one of the biggest letdowns thus far on DS." Game Revolution said that the game "takes everything I remember about playing tradable card games, highlights the bad parts, and then breaks." Famicom Tsūshin scored the game a 25 out of 40.
