= The Last Blade 2 =

1998 video game

- Developer: SNK
- Publisher: SNK: Agetec, Playmore (Dreamcast)
- Writer: Hidetaka Suehiro
- Series: The Last Blade
- Platform: Arcade: Dreamcast, Neo Geo AES, Neo Geo CD
- Release: November 25, 1998: Arcade; JP: November 25, 1998; NA: January 1999 Neo Geo AES; JP: January 28, 1999; NA: 1999 Neo Geo CD; JP: February 27, 1999 Dreamcast; JP: December 21, 2000; NA: 6 August 2001
- Genre: Fighting
- Modes: Single-player, multiplayer
- Arcade system: Neo Geo MVS

The Last Blade 2 (Note: Known in Japan as Bakumatsu Romance Act 2: Moon Flower Swordsman - Flowers That Bloom In the Moon, Flowers That Scatter (幕末浪漫第二幕 月華の剣士 ～月に咲く華、散りゆく花～, Bakumatsu Roman Dainimaku: Gekka no Kenshi - Tsuki ni Saku Hana, Chiri Yuku Hana)) is a 1998 fighting game developed and published by SNK for the Neo Geo arcade and home platforms. It is the sequel to The Last Blade. It was ported to a series of home consoles.

== Gameplay ==
Gameplay screenshot showcasing a match between Akari Ichijou and Hibiki Takane

Gameplay elements remain the same as their predecessor with some minor adjustments. An "EX" mode was added to play, which is a combination of "Speed" and "Power". The mood is grimmer than its predecessor through the introduction to the game. The characters are colored slightly darker, and the game's cut-scenes are made longer to emphasize the importance of the plot. Characters are no longer equal, hosting greater differences in strengths and weaknesses than before.

== Characters ==
Three new characters were introduced:

- Hibiki Takane (高嶺 響, Takane Hibiki) is the 17-year-old daughter of Genzō Takane (高嶺 源蔵, Takane Genzō), a renowned swordsmith known throughout Japan during the Bakumatsu era. He had retired to an isolated area in the countryside with his daughter but continued his work with various swordsmen around the country. One fateful day, Setsuna approaches Genzō and requests that he forge a new sword. Though the man radiated an aura of pure, unfathomable evil, the master swordsmith finds himself unable to refuse the request. He spends a time of almost 3 months forging this sword, which he dubs the “Yaso Magatsu Hi no Tachi” (八十枉津日太刀, “Blade of Eighty Days Harbored Unwillingly”), detailing the amount of time he invested in the weapon. The labor renders him ill, however, and he is soon permanently bedridden. He tells his daughter that the silver-haired man was the reason for his condition, and that she should pursue him and the sword that he had forged. With a concerned Hibiki by his side, he utters his last words: “The thing that I saw... that I felt, even you must understand.” Though she was confused by her father's cryptic request, Hibiki gathers her belongings and leaves in search of the silver-haired man. Several days later, a man named Hyo Amano stops by, hoping that Genzō would repair his weapon, the “Otokomae”, when he learns of the swordsmith's death, he sets out to find his daughter. Hibiki has 2 endings in the game; one of them involve her deciding to improve her swordsmanship which can be gained if the player defeats the opponents they face in Arcade mode with her super moves in every round.
- Setsuna (刹那) is a powerful spirit that was released after Kagami was defeated by Kaede. Finding a deceased baby on a field of battle, he possesses it. After maturing his human form into an adult, he walks the path of destruction, killing and filled with hate for the human race. He uses a black katana-like blade, which leaves a trail of dark energy in its wake. He is directly responsible for the death of Hibiki's father, forcing him by sheer charisma to forge his sword and work on it to the utter limit.
- Kojiroh Sanada (真田 小次郎, Sanada Kojirō) was the captain of the fictional Shinsengumi Unit Zero, which investigated demonic forces in Japan, following the concept of Bushidō. After Kojiroh dies investigating “Hell’s Gate”, his sister Kaori disguises herself as him, using his identity in order to investigate the evils within, as well as to restore the faith in the Shinsengumi. She also travels to finish off the former Shinsengumi, Shikyoh. Washizuka is the only known person to know her true identity. Kaori shares similar moves with Washizuka, but does not perform them via the "charge" mechanism.

== Release ==
The Last Blade 2 was made available for SNK's Neo Geo AES and Neo Geo CD. The Neo Geo CD version includes an extra quiz mode, voiced cutscenes, and a gallery section featuring art from both Last Blade titles. Most of these additional features were also included with the Dreamcast port titled The Last Blade 2: Heart of the Samurai, released in 2001. The Neo Geo CD and Dreamcast versions added an additional character named Musashi Akatsuki, the sub-boss from the first game.

The Last Blade 2 was subsequently bundled with the original Last Blade for a PlayStation 2 compilation released only in Japan; both games are arcade perfect emulations of the original games and do not contain additions from the other console versions. At PlayStation Experience 2015, SNK Playmore announced PlayStation 4 and PlayStation Vita versions of The Last Blade 2 developed by Code Mystics; they vere released in May 2016. Hamster Corporation re-released the game as part of their ACA Neo Geo series for the PlayStation 4, Xbox One, Nintendo Switch, Windows, Android and iOS.

== Reception ==
Reception

Review scores
Publication	Score
AllGame	(NG) 4/5 (DC) 3.5/5
Consoles +	(NG) 85%
Edge	(DC) 6/10
GameSpot	(DC) 8.1/10
IGN	(DC) 8.7/10
Joypad	(NG) 7/10
Next Generation	(DC) 3/5
Nintendo Life	(VC) 9/10 (NS) 9/10
Video Games (DE)	(NG) 78% (DC) 80%
GameShark.com	(DC) 7/10
Power Unlimited	(DC) 77/100

In Japan, Game Machine listed The Last Blade 2 as being the second most popular arcade game of December 1998. According to Famitsu, the Neo Geo CD version sold over 9,379 copies in its first week of release. Blake Fischer reviewed the Dreamcast version of the game for Next Generation, rating it three stars out of five, and stated that "A unique 2D fighter for Dreamcast which is a welcome break from the plethora of Street Fighter variants we've seen in the States. Too bad you'll have to track down an import to play." In 2012, GamesRadar+ included Last Blade 2 among the little-known classic fighting games that deserve HD remakes, calling it "one of the Neo Geo’s prettiest, deepest fighters."
