= The Last Blade =

1997 video game

- Developer: SNK
- Publisher: SNK
- Director: Kimura Ken
- Producers: Akira Goto; Hiroshi Matsumoto
- Designers: Econo Daisuke; Eiji Fukatsu; H. Taniguchi
- Programmer: Naoyan Apchiba
- Artist: Toshiaki Mori
- Writer: Hidetaka Suehiro
- Composers: Hiroshi Yamazoe; Yasuhiro Naka; Yasuo Yamate
- Series: The Last Blade
- Platforms: Arcade, Neo Geo AES, Neo Geo CD, PlayStation
- Release: Arcade: JP: December 5, 1997; NA: January 1998; Neo Geo AES: JP: January 29, 1998; NA: 1998; Neo Geo CD: JP: March 26, 1998; PlayStation: JP: February 25, 1999
- Genre: Fighting
- Modes: Single-player, multiplayer
- Arcade system: Neo Geo MVS

The Last Blade (Note: Also known as Bakumatsu Romance: Moon Flower Swordsman (Japanese: 幕末浪漫: 月華の剣士, Hepburn: Bakumatsu Roman: Gekka no Kenshi) in Japan and The Last Soldier in Korea.) is a 1997 fighting game developed and published by SNK for the Neo Geo arcade and home platforms. It was also ported to several home systems. A sequel, The Last Blade 2, was released in 1998. A second sequel, The Last Blade: Beyond the Destiny, was released in 2000.

The game takes place during the Bakumatsu era in Japan, and incorporates various elements of Japanese mythology (with a heavy emphasis on the symbology of the Four Symbols). As such, the background music generally incorporates synthesized instruments simulating a sound appropriate to the 19th century setting, in a Western classical, pseudo-Romantic style (unusual for a fighting game).

== Gameplay ==
Gameplay screenshot showcasing a match between Yuki and Hyo Amano

The Last Blade series is seen as a spiritual offshoot to SNK's popular Samurai Shodown series, due to it being a similar 2D weapons-based fighting game. It also took over several elements from cancelled Technōs/Face's Dragon's Heaven (which tentatively was named DarkSeed). The gameplay is characterised by two selectable fighting styles, and a unique combo system along with a "deflect" system which involves pressing the D button at an opponent's attack. Upon deflecting, the opponent is left open to attack.

The two styles are Speed mode and Power mode. Speed mode allows players to chain several normal attacks into a special or desperation/super move, as well as execute a Speed Combo. Power mode on the other hand, grants the player increased damage potential exponentially and gives access to Super Desperation Moves, which inflict an exorbitant amount of damage (performing them however, requires the player's life bar to flash and have a full power bar). Power mode also allows the player to perform Super Cancels; canceling a special move into a desperation/super move (but not a desperation move, with the sole exception of Awakened Kaede in the first game).

== Characters ==
- Akari Ichijou (一条 あかり, Ichijō Akari) is a 14-year-old girl in The Last Blade. Born and raised in Tokyo, she was constantly battling diseases on her own until she finally understood her true calling: teleportation. When her older sister Hikari succumbed to disease, Akari became very agitated. At that time, their father called for her. She restlessly sat before her grim-faced father, who was about to give her a lecture about Hell's Gate. Akari found out that Hell's Gate was causing trouble again, and flew out of the room, bent on finding the perfect cure for her sister's disease on her own: sealing Hell's Gate. Her father accused her of not listening to what he said, but she was already gone.
- Musashi Akatsuki (暁 武蔵, Akatsuki Musashi; "The Risen Musashi") is a legendary swordsman who once traveled the countryside, honing his skills and challenging worthy opponents along the way. During one of his battles he was killed by another swordsman. When Shinnosuke Kagami begins his plan to open Hell's Gate and bring about a new world order, he resurrects Musashi to further his plans and kill innocent people. To both their chagrins, while on one of his travels, Musashi was defeated. Honorable just like he was during his life, he bids farewell to his opponent, before dissolving in a beam of light. Although a playable character in the first game (unlocked via a code), he is not allowed in matches. He has a crouching animation (which is uncommon for some bosses in SNK fighters). His character is based on the historical Miyamoto Musashi.
- Genbu no Okina (玄武の翁; “Old Man of the Black Tortoise”) is a guardian of the demonic portal known as “Hell’s Gate”. For years, he and the other three guardians stood watch over its seal. For many years it was peaceful and Okina resigned himself to fishing and the complacent life of a hermit. Five years into his life of leisure, he was found by Kaede, who wished to train with him to improve his own sword skills. Okina taught the young man all he knew and Kaede left after he had improved his skills. Sensing the boy's departure and inquiry for training as a sign of trouble, Okina followed him at a distance. Despite Kaede preventing the opening of the Gate, it had still not been sealed properly. As the oldest guardian, Okina was aware of that and knew that to properly seal the portal, the legendary “Sealing Maiden” was required to perform the ritual. He also discovered that an assassin called the “Messenger From Afar” was rumored to pursue the maiden. Determined to fulfill his role as a guardian, Okina set out on a journey.
- Hyo Amano (天野 漂, Amano Hyō) is characterized by his outlandish mannerisms and flamboyant personality. He uses the element of fire in some of his attacks as well as special techniques involving sakura petals. As a carefree and fun-loving individual, Hyo has a strong love for sake, women, and the thrill of the fight. When he discovers the petals of the beautiful cherry trees falling from their branches, he panics and decides he must go defeat opponents to solve the “problem”. In the end, he discovers it was only the changing of the seasons that resulted in the petals falling from the trees. After learning of the cause for the various Sakura trees petals falling, Hyo is devastated to learn that the sky is turning a dreadful gray color due to the re-opening of “Hell's Gate”. He draws his sword, but finds it oddly dull and fragile. In order to fix it, he decides to ask his friend Takane Genzō, a master swordsmith, to fix it. However, his friend has died. Amano discovers that he had a daughter, Hibiki Takane, who had recently departed the household. Concerned for his sword and for Hibiki, he sets off to locate her. Hyo's ending in both games is interesting in that the player must choose one of two (or three in the first game) choices, each of which causes Hyo to behave differently.
- Juzoh Kanzaki (神崎 十三, Kanzaki Jūzō) is characterized as a power-type character in gameplay. He is the adopted brother of Akari Ichijou. Despite this, he and his adoptive family are very close. At home, he is generally free-spirited and somewhat lazy. Sometime during this, he learned how to use a club with his brute strength (apparently to pass the time). While in the course of his usual lying around the house with little to keep him preoccupied, he was knocked out and kidnapped by Akari, who “persuaded” him to accompany her on a journey to discover the landmark known as the “Gate of Hell”. After their adventure, their sister Hikari falls ill and the two become extremely concerned about her health. One day as Juzoh is visiting Hikari, she discloses that their sister Akari had run away to “Hell's Gate” again to find a cure for her curse. To lay both their fears to rest, Juzoh pursues her on her quest.
- Kaede (楓) is considered the main protagonist of the series. He was the son of a warrior named Gaisei, a master swordsman who trained him with two other orphans, Moriya Minakata and Yuki. As he grew, he became an avid swordsman and powerful warrior. One day, when he was twelve, he and Yuki returned from an errand to discover their master slain and Moriya standing over his corpse. Enraged, Kaede physically attacked him for the (presumed) killing of their master. Moriya withstood the attack and left in silence. Shortly thereafter, Kaede and Yuki depart their foster home to avenge the death of their master and confront the killer. Five years on their quest, he still searches for Moriya. He eventually discovers that the real killer of his master was one of the four guardians of hell, Shinnosuke Kagami. He engages him, but the guardian's superior skill quickly overpowers him. However, it is revealed that Kaede possesses the power of the legendary dragon Seiryū, transforming various physical aspects and giving him additional power. With his transformation into “awakened Kaede” (覚醒楓, Kakusei Kaede), he defeats Kagami. After honing his skills and learning to control the power of the Seiryū to a greater extent, Kaede and Yuki set off to meet the Genbu no Okina in order to find more information. When they arrive, they discover that the “Sealing Rite” needs to be performed, for a great evil threatens the world. This rite is to be performed by a special maiden, but a warrior named the “Messenger From Afar” seeks to assassinate her and prevent her from performing it. Kaede sets out to protect the maiden and to allow her to accomplish her mission. To his sadness at the end of Last Blade 2, the maiden is none other than Yuki herself, and her duty is to sacrifice herself to seal the Hell's Gate.
- Keiichiro Washizuka (鷲塚 慶一郎, Washizuka Keiichirō) is a fictional unit leader of the real life Shinsengumi, a police-like group during the Bakumatsu era. He is a firm believer in restoring order to Japan, and in the old ways of Samurai sword fighting. As such, he carries a very serious persona. He is extremely loyal to his Shinsengumi unit, and is a friend of Kojiroh Sanada. He is the only one in the unit who is aware that “Kojiroh” is actually Kojiroh's sister Kaori.
- Gaisei (慨世) (or rather, Kouryu (黄龍, Kōryū) in his new form) is the legendary warrior that trained Kaede, Yuki and Moriya Minakata. After Shinnosuke Kagami's aborted plan to remove the seal on “Hell’s Gate” and bring about a new world order, Gaisei presumably stood up against the guardian in an attempt to stop him. Unfortunately, Shinnosuke is too powerful, and he dies in the battle. He is later discovered by his three students, who all vow to take revenge on his killer. Kaede accomplishes this, activating his power of the Seiryū and defeating Shinnosuke. This also clears Moriya's reputation, as he was originally blamed for killing Gaisei. In The Last Blade 2, Gaisei is still deceased. However, an unknown force of evil resurrects him and drives the now-undead warrior insane. Additionally, he manages to combine the legendary powers of Suzaku, Seiryuu, Byakko and Genbu into his being, making him much more powerful than before. The now godlike warrior roams the lands and is called “Kouryu”, the Yellow Dragon.
- Lee Rekka (李 烈火, Rī Rekka; Pinyin: Lǐ Lìehǔo, Cantonese Yale: Léih Liht-fó) hails from Qing dynasty China, where he learned a martial art that allows the user to control fire and involves the use of fans and powerful kicks. One day, he witnessed a “red star” (the opening of “Hell's Gate”). Knowing it to be a sign of great evil, he travels from his homeland of China to stop the evil before it spreads across the world. After the closing of the Gate, he remained in Japan. He continued to study and improve his skills in the martial arts while earning a modest living at a nearby farm. When he senses the re-opening of Hell's Gate, he stops his training to investigate once more.
- Moriya Minakata (御名方 守矢, Minakata Moriya) is a young swordsman in training under a legendary teacher named Gaisei. Under his tutelage, along with Kaede and Yuki, he became great swordsman. For many years, they lived happily together while learning bushidō. One day he discovered his master dead, and the killer was nowhere to be found. Kaede sees him over the body, and seeks to slay him under the belief he slew Gaisei. With this, he sets out on the run. Not only does he wish to avoid this confrontation, but he also seeks the man named Shinnosuke Kagami (who was the real killer) in order clear his name. However, after over five years of searching, Moriya has yet to find Kagami, who is defeated by Kaede instead. After failing to take revenge upon Kagami, Moriya recluses himself to the wilderness to improve his skills and techniques. During this time, he finds within himself an urge to “return” to the portal known as “Hell’s Gate”. Ceasing his training, he travels in order to seek the truth, which he soon finds out in Last Blade 2 that he was originally meant to kill Gaisei when his former master is resurrected as an undead warrior by the effects of Hell's Gate.
- Shigen Naoe (直衛 示源, Naoe Shigen) is a guardian of a portal called the “Hell’s Gate”. Before the events of the first game, he is magically sealed in a massive stone for ten years by a friend who perceived him to be a threat. He eventually escaped, but clouded by his rage and anger, he could only think of getting back at his captor. He set out to exact revenge.
- Shikyoh (紫鏡, Shikyō; The kanji read “purple mirror” in allusion to a Japanese urban legend) is a previous member of the Shinsengumi, an organization that was to protect the weak. However, Shikyoh merely joined to kill innocents. When his superiors and comrades discovered this, they resolved to punish him, but he escaped before they could take action. When he discovered the opening of the “Hell’s Gate”, he thought it a perfect opportunity to continue his killing spree and set out in search of more prey. After his death, Shikyoh was re-animated in the form of a zombie named Mukuro (骸; “corpse”). With his love of killing still fresh in his mind along with his few memories and fighting style, Mukuro wanders the land in his undead form, continuing to kill innocents.
- Shinnosuke Kagami (嘉神 慎之介, Kagami Shinnosuke) is featured as a boss character in The Last Blade and was toned down to be regular playable character in the sequel. Shinnosuke is one of the guardians of “Hell’s Gate”, a portal that allows demons and evil energy to seep through to the mortal plane humans call Earth. After residing over his position and finding (or so he thought) that the humans he protected were weak and inferior to himself, he decides to release the seal on the portal. Along with this, he goes on a horrific killing spree, murdering various warriors including Gaisei. After five years of preparatory action to unseal the gate, including imprisoning his fellow guardian, Shigen Naoe, Shinnosuke is eventually found by Kaede, who has the latent power of the Seiryū. Kaede defeats him; humiliated by his defeat, Shinnosuke is thrown into the depths of Hell's Gate as eternal punishment. However, he is soon reincarnated in a new form, but same appearance to fulfill his role as a guardian, as the portal is being opened by another force. Shinnosuke sets out to fulfill his destiny, and to seek atonement.
- Yuki (雪; meaning “snow”) is the daughter of a foreign family that managed ship trades; unfortunately, her family died in a ship accident. She is later adopted by Gaisei, who trains her along with two other students: Moriya Minakata and Kaede. Unlike her fellow companions, she picks up the naginata instead of the katana. She also secretly harbors feelings for Moriya over the course of her training. The year she turns 13, she returns with Kaede to find their teacher dead and Moriya standing over the body. Mortified, she watched as Kaede attacked Moriya. Moriya silently took his leave shortly thereafter. She and Kaede then embarked on a five-year journey, eventually discovering the truth: a powerful swordsman named Shinnosuke Kagami was the one who had murdered their master. She assists Kaede in defeating Kagami, both avenging their master's death and clearing Moriya's name. Eventually in Last Blade 2, she is revealed to be the main of Four Star, who is destined to die after sealing it, with Yuki is tasked to fulfill her mission, even it means to say goodbye to two of her brothers.
- Zantetsu (斬鉄) is one of the last of numerous ninja clans that roam ancient Japan. Due to the decline of the ninja population, the Japanese common folk begin to consider the title “ninja” a thing to scoff at. Determined to prove the superiority of his people, he challenges warriors time and time again to prove his strength. When he hears of the opening of a portal called “Hell’s Gate”, he sets out to defeat the enemies within to prove his strength. He is heavily implied to be the ancestor of Eiji Kisaragi from the Art of Fighting series.

All of the characters in the Last Blade series are of Japanese origin, excluding Lee Rekka, who is from China, and Yuki, who is from Russia. Some characters, such as Akatsuki Musashi and Lee Rekka, are based on historical or legendary figures. A number of characters from the Last Blade series also appeared in SNK Playmore's Neo Geo Battle Coliseum.

== Versions and re-releases ==
The Last Blade was subsequently bundled with the sequel The Last Blade 2 for a PlayStation 2 compilation released only in Japan titled Bakumatsu Roman Gekka no Kenshi 1･2 on January 12, 2006; both games are arcade perfect emulations of the original games. The PlayStation version was re-released for PlayStation 3 via PlayStation Network in Asia on May 31, 2007, and later for Vita.

It was re-released for Wii via the Virtual Console by D4 Enterprise in Japan on March 13, 2012, in North America on June 7, 2012, and in PAL regions on August 2, 2012.

A version for Microsoft Windows, OS X, Linux and asm.js developed by DotEmu was released by SNK Playmore as part of the Humble NEOGEO 25th Anniversary Bundle on December 8, 2015. It was released on Steam on August 31, 2016, and on GOG.com on May 30, 2017.

Hamster Corporation re-released the game as part of their ACA Neo Geo series for the PlayStation 4, Xbox One, Nintendo Switch, Windows, Android and iOS.

== Reception ==
Reception

Review scores
Publication	Score
AllGame	(NG) 4/5
GameSpot	(PS) 8.1/10
Nintendo Life	(VC) 9/10 (NS) 9/10
Consoles +	(NGCD) 85%
Joypad	(NG) 8/10
The Next Level	(AC) 4/5
Player One	(AC) 93% (NG) 92%
Super Game Power	(NG) 5/5
Video Games	(NG) 86% (PS) 50%

In Japan, Game Machine listed The Last Blade on their January 1, 1998 issue as being the most popular arcade game at the time. According to Famitsu, the Neo Geo CD version sold over 22,735 copies in its first week on the market. Rafael Fernández Barbero of Spanish magazine Loading gave the PlayStation port a positive outlook.
