= The King of Fighters '94 Re-Bout =

- Japanese PlayStation 2 box art for The King of Fighters '94 Re-Bout, featuring Kyo Kusanagi
- Developer: SNK Playmore
- Publisher: JP: SNK Playmore
- Artist: Hiroaki Hashimoto
- Series: The King of Fighters
- Platform: PlayStation 2
- Release: JP: December 28, 2004
- Genre: Fighting
- Modes: Single-player, multiplayer

The King of Fighters '94 Re-Bout (Japanese: ザ・キング・オブ・ファイターズ'94 RE-BOUT, Hepburn: Za Kingu obu Faitāzu '94 RE-BOUT) is a 2D fighting game developed by SNK Playmore was released exclusively in Japan for the PlayStation 2 on December 28, 2004. The game is a remake of the first installment of The King of Fighters series, The King of Fighters '94. Just like the original game, Re-Bout features 24 playable characters taken from multiple SNK IPs as well as multiple original characters that fight each other in the titular worldwide tournament host by the game's boss Rugal Bernstein who becomes playable alongside the cameo character Saisyu Kusanagi who appeared in a cutscene from the Neo Geo game.

The game features revised sprites, new artwork by Hiroaki Hashimoto and animated intro. SNK Playmore developed the game for the series' 10th anniversary, improving visuals, gameplay aspects and background in the process. However, due to bugs and delays the localization was cancelled. A port for the Xbox was also planned but was cancelled.

Critical response to the visuals was mixed regarding how well it was executed when compared to other IPs but the new gameplay features were still praised for making the remake more accessible to modern gamers. However, the lack of localization resulted in disappointments.

== Features ==
A screenshot of The King of Fighters '94 Re-Bout, showing Kyo Kusanagi and Mai Shiranui

The King of Fighters '94 Re-Bout is a 2D fighting game released commemorating the franchise's tenth anniversary. Like the original game, it features characters from SNK's previous fighting game properties, such as Fatal Fury and Art of Fighting, alongside updated versions of characters from Ikari Warriors and Psycho Soldier, and several new, original characters.

Just like the original game, the game features 24 playable characters divided into eight teams of three fighters. However, unlike the original The King of Fighters '94, the player is able to edit their own teams similar to the feature sequels have. Re-Bout also adds the character of Saisyu Kusanagi who was a cameo in the original The King of Fighters '94 dying in front of the protagonist Kyo Kusanagi as well as the boss Rugal Bernstein. The story centers on The King of Fighters tournament organized by the wealthy criminal Rugal. Just like in most games, the characters retain their original special moves and Desperation Moves which are used to defeat the enemies.

== Development ==
Example of the game's remade sprites using the Japanese team

The game was first revealed in the Tokyo Game Show event from 2004 by SNK Playmore with plans to release for the PlayStation 2 in Winter of the same year. The game was made to have multiple improvements over the original such as editing colors, online functions and a special edition that features an extra CD that retells the series' story in conmemoration of the franchise's tenth anniversary. The game retains the 2D fighting sprites but revised while stages were instead remade into 3D backgrounds. For the E3 2005, SNK announced plans for a Xbox port of the game with online function just like the PlayStation 2 version.

The game was released in Japan on December 28, 2004. Hiroaki Hashimoto did the artwork for the game.The game features rearranged music, new stages, and an online versus mode. A North American version was planned for the Xbox. It was completed and even reviewed by several publications, but was ultimately canceled in March 2006 for undisclosed reasons. In January 2015, the game was re-released as a classic available to every region as first shown in a Korea's Game Rating Board.

== Reception ==
In anticipation for the Xbox port, Richard Li from 1UP.com saw the online functions as the best parts of the game as it gathers several gamers to compete against each. He noted the character sprites were remade, something that the series was famous for in general when compared to other fighting game series that uses 3D instead. Jeff Gerstmann from GameSpot had mixed feelings about the improvements of visuals, not seeing them notable for the PlayStaiton 2 release and also not up to the standards of 3D backgrounds. Nevertheless, he still praised the inclusion of the Team Edit feature introduced in The King of Fighters '95 which gives the remake more potential for enjoyment. Anoop Gantayat from IGN found the graphics appealing in and appreciated the backgrounds can be changed back to the original form.

In a retrospect article, Chris Rasa from Hardcore Gaming 101 found the animation the same as the previous version but still critcized the sprites for not looking as appealing as the one featured in recent games like the Guilty Gear series or Fist of the North Star. According to Rasa, the game's localization was cancelled due to issues with bugs and constant delays. While considering the remake a improvement over the original, he still found Re-Bout dated when compared to recent installments of the franchise, seeing the online functions as the only gameplay value that attracted people. He still praised the production values for the new animated intro comparable to the Sega Dreamcast port of The King of Fighters '98 and most of the new artwork done by artist Hiroaki Hashimoto.

Following the game's release in Japan, the PS2 version sold 28,482 units. Meanwhile, SNK Playmore noted negative fan feedback regarding the simple upscaling and smoothing of character sprites, which prompted the company to create entirely new, high-resolution sprites for subsequent entries in the series, including The King of Fighters XII.
