= The King of Fighters: Destiny =

Japanese-Chinese-Malaysian CG animated series

- Logo of the series featuring Kyo Kusanagi
- Original net animation
- Directed by: Yang Yifeng
- Produced by: Hugo Chen; Zeng Chao; Hua Xia; Yang Ce
- Written by: Wang Ting; Yu Xiang; Sun Momo; Chen Chenfei; Liu Yingling; Min Lui
- Music by: Guo Shensheng; Chen Zhiyi
- Studio: iDragons Creative Studio; Animonsta Studios
- Licensed by: NA: Aniplex of America; SEA: Muse Communication
- Released: August 3, 2017 – January 8, 2018
- Runtime: 12–18 minutes (each)
- Episodes: 24

The King of Fighters: Destiny (Chinese: 拳皇命运; pinyin: Quánhuáng Mìngyùn) is a Malaysian-Chinese CG animated series in The King of Fighters media franchise, produced by the Chinese studio iDragons and the Malaysian studio Animonsta Studios for the Japanese company SNK, as a promotional tie-in to the Chinese mobile game, The King of Fighters: World. Focused on its title tournament, the plot shows arriving in South Town, Kyo Kusanagi, an invitee to KOF, among other formidable fighters who have join with other two fighters to form a team and face each other. The series run between August 2017 and January 2018.

Despite mixed response due to its dated animation, Destiny was praised for its narrative as it focuses on multiple characters. The series has received over 800 million views.

== Plot ==
A man hosts a new fighting tournament known as The King of Fighters where teams composed of three fighters against others. The young Kyo Kusanagi from Japan joins with his friends Benimaru Nikaido and Goro Daimon to compete in South Town. In the same place, Terry Bogard, his adoptive brother Andy and their friend Joe Higashi aim to avenge the death of his father Jeff Bogard at the hands of crime lord Geese Howard. A woman named Angelina is sent to seduce Terry and kill him but the two fall in love. During the tournament, Terry fights Geese and defeats him in revenge after Angelina is murdered by his nemesis.

Kyo senses the presence of a mythological creature known as Orochi his clan sealed years ago with the help of Yasakani and Yata. As a result, Kyo takes priority in taking down the Orochi possessed warriors. With help of the Psycho Soldiers Team, Kyo and his allies save the fighters from Orochi. Shortly afterwards, the mercenary Heidern requests Kyo's and Terry's among other's help to take down the tournament's host, Rugal Bernstein, responsible for the release of the demons power. Despite being overpowered, Kyo is able to kill Rugal when having a vision of a person teaching him a new technique. The fighters escape from Rugal's destroyed ship. However, a priest named Goentiz finds Rugal and hides his body. In the final scenes, a musician loses control of his body while Kyo embarks on a new unknown quest.

Besides the main storyline episodes, there are also episodes focused on some character's pasts including Geese, Angelina, Benimaru and how they met other characters.

== Cast ==
Character	Japanese voice actor	Chinese voice actor
Kyo Kusanagi	Tomoaki Maeno	Sen Fu
Benimaru Nikaido	Atsushi Maezuka	Lu Zhao
Goro Daimon	Takahiro Fujiwara	Xianglong Meng
Terry Bogard	Takashi Kondō	Junhang Fan
Andy Bogard	Hiroshi Okamoto	Zhen Cao
Joe Higashi	Kōzō Mito	Yue Bai
Ryo Sakazaki	Daiki Takakura	Beichen Liu
Robert Garcia	Go Shinomiya	Feng Jin
Mai Shiranui	Ami Koshimizu	Selene Zhan
King	Harumi Ikoma	Yanqian Luo
Yuri Sakazaki	Ai Kakuma	Yiwen Chen
Kim Kaphwan	Kunihiro Kawamoto	Yuantao Li
Chang Koehan	Hiroyuki Arita	Fei Liu
Choi Bounge	Atsushi Maezuka	Li Lu
Athena Asamiya	Haruna Ikezawa	Anqi Zhang
Chin Gentsai	Shintaro Tanaka	Xiaobing Wang
Sie Kensou	Yuto Kaname	Zhengxiang Li
Heidern	Haruo Yamagishi	Yifeng Guo
Clark Still	Tomo Kasaya	Zongzhe Xu
Ralf Jones	Bunshu Shinoya	Xin Zhang
Geese Howard	Kong Kuwata	Nan Gui
Billy Kane	Masaki Masaki	Yao Liu
Angelina	Miyuki Sawashiro	Shuai Zhou
Heavy D!	Takayuki Nakatsukasa	Qui San
Lucky Glauber	Haruo Yamagishi	Shi Chen
Brian Battler	Taro Kiuchi	Fenggang Tu
Saisyu Kusanagi	Haruo Yamagishi	Yuzhu Cheng
Shizuka Kusanagi	Yoko Imaizumi	Xiaotong Lu
Jeff Bogard	Toshiyuki Morikawa	Xin Zhang
Rugal Bernstein	Tsuguo Mogami	Feng Liu
Goenitz	Susumu Akagi	Bo Peng
Mature	Yū Shimamura	Haitian Hong
Simon	Go Shinomiya	Pingzhi Hu
Matt	Tetsuya Kakihara	Fan Hai
Rock Howard (child)	Ami Koshimizu	Minjia Shao
Iori Yagami	Takanori Hoshino	Yijia Liu
Andy Bogard (child)	Hiroyuki Kagura	n/a
Geese Howard (child)	Yohei Hamada	n/a
Wolfgang Krauser (child)	Takuya Iwabata	n/a
Mr. Big	Yuki Arai	n/a
Jan	Uiyo Sakurai	n/a

== Episodes ==
No. overall	No. in series	Title	Directed by	Written by	Original release date
1	1	"South Town"	Unknown	Unknown	August 3, 2017
THE KING OF FIGHTERS – The world-renowned tournament starts now! After arriving in South Town, Kyo, an invitee to KOF, runs into another formidable fighter, Terry. Ten years have passed since the tragedy that changed his live forever… The destinies of the fighters now cross here in South Town.
2	2	"Kyokugen Style"	Unknown	Unknown	August 10, 2017
When Kyo, Benimaru and Daimon visit the Kyokugen Style Dojo in South Town, they come across Ryo chasing down men in black suits. Kyo and his friends head off to Geese Tower in pursuit as well. Once they arrive at the tower, Geese's right-hand man, Billy descends on them.
3	3	"Angelina"	Unknown	Unknown	August 17, 2017
Kyo and Ryo hit it off immediately. They receive a call about Yuri, Ryo's little sister, and how she has run away from home. While searching for information about Geese, Terry bumps into a mysterious lady named Angelina at a nightclub.
4	4	"Brother"	Unknown	Unknown	August 24, 2017
After leaving the nightclub, Terry is challenged by a mysterious fighter. This fighter turns out to be Andy, Terry's little brother, who he has not seen in 10 years. In order to take revenge on Geese for what he did to their father, Jeff, they team up with Joe to infiltrate Geese Tower.
5	5	"Side Story- Geese Howard: Origin"	Unknown	Unknown	August 31, 2017
When Geese was young, he was driven out from Stroheim Castle since his mother was not the legal wife of his father. After wandering on his own, he becomes a disciple of Tung Fu Rue. During his time there he harbors hatred for another disciple, Jeff, over who would inherit his master's role and secrets.
6	6	"Queens Team"	Unknown	Unknown	September 7, 2017
Kyo senses the power of Orochi in South Town and is concerned whether the Orochi seal is weakening. In another part of the world, Yuri is searching for teammates to participate in the KOF tournament with her. While in London she runs into two female fighters, King and Mai.
7	7	"Memories"	Unknown	Unknown	September 14, 2017
Terry tails Angelina to search for more information about Geese. He finds Angelina who is threatened by Matt. Matt is a following of Geese and Terry saves Angelina from his hands. Angelina suddenly recalls what happened in her past.
8	8	"Reception"	Unknown	Unknown	September 21, 2017
Fighters come together in the announcement event for KOF. Benimaru gets excited with the heated atmosphere, Athena attracts everybody in the venue, Ryo reunites with his sister, Yuri, Mai starts to quarrel with Andy… All fighter's minds cross here before KOF.
9	9	"Secret"	Unknown	Unknown	September 28, 2017
Terry sneaks out from the KOF announcement event and successfully infiltrates to the Geese Tower. He witnesses the dreadful experiment in a room at the basement. Meanwhile Geese finds Terry's past and gives an "order" to Angelina.
10	10	"Side Story- Benimaru Nikado: Origin"	Unknown	Unknown	October 12, 2017
No one could stand a chance against Benimaru until he met Kyo. Benimaru begs Kyo for a re-match before mysterious men in black suddenly surround Kyo. The men confront and attack Kyo in front of Benimaru. How will Benimaru react to this unexpected brawl!?
11	11	"Ready Go!"	Unknown	Unknown	October 19, 2017
Angelina is ordered to kill Terry by poisoning him. A blond haired kid suddenly appears and pretends Terry is his dad to escape trouble. Soon afterwards, the KOF tournament gets underway at the stadium. The audience gets hype as the fighters prepare to battle it out!
12	12	"Shadow of Evil"	Unknown	Unknown	October 26, 2017
The first KOF match starts out with a bang, with all eyes on the event. Benimaru struggles in his battle against Brian, as he continues to stand back up no matter how many times he is beaten by Benimaru. The crowd becomes uneasy as they watch Brian's eerie performance.
13	13	"Trap"	Unknown	Unknown	October 26, 2017
Kyo and his teammates struggle with the American Sports Team who show signs of the Orochi power. Meanwhile, Terry heads to Gesse Tower to rescue Angelina, despite knowing it's a trap.
14	14	"Fatal Fury"	Unknown	Unknown	November 2, 2017
Terry and Angelina try to escape from Geese Tower. However, when they arrive on the top floor, Terry's sworn enemy, Geese, stands in their way. In order to take revenge for his father and save Angelina, Terry's Fatal Fury begins!
15	15	"Side Story- Angelina: Origin"	Unknown	Unknown	November 9, 2017
Ten years ago, Terry became a disciple of Tung. On the day of his departure, he saves a girl being threatened by local punks. Terry tries to cheer her up by suggesting that they both leave South Town together. Her name is Angelina…
16	16	"Final Round"	Unknown	Unknown	November 16, 2017
Geese has obtained the power of Orochi. Terry struggles to deal with Geese's overwhelming power. Geese readies his finishing move for Terry, who is fighting for his life. This fatal battle between these two fighters will decide their ultimate destiny.
17	17	"Black Crystal"	Unknown	Unknown	November 24, 2017
A party is held on a cruise ship and the fighters gather to relax before the final round. However, the organizer "R" has set a trap for them. Meanwhile, Kyo and his friends sneak out of the tournament venue and bear witness to the power of the black crystal.
18	18	"Escape"	Unknown	Unknown	November 30, 2017
Athena and her teammates battle Kim Team who have turned violent. Athena tries to expose the secret of the Black Crystal with her Psychic Power. Meanwhile, Kyo attempts to escape from their cell with Benimaru and Daimon who came to their senses, springing a new trap in the process!
19	19	"Labyrinth"	Unknown	Unknown	December 7, 2017
The Fatal Fury Team successfully infiltrates the cruise ship. However, while traversing the ship which has turned into a labyrinth, they are attacked by Mai and her teammates, who have lost control. Both Andy and Joe are beaten, while Terry is confronted by another assassin.
20	20	"Side Story- King: Origin"	Unknown	Unknown	December 14, 2017
King works as a bouncer in order to pay the medical bills for her little brother, Jan. The owner orders her to kill Ryo who is on his way to save his little sister, Yuri, who has been kidnapped. The lives of King and Jan are dramatically changed by meeting the Sakazaki siblings.
21	21	"Generator"	Unknown	Unknown	December 21, 2017
Athena senses the energy source of the evil power and uses her telepathy to inform Kyo. Kyo and his teammates find a generator which has a black crystal to generate the evil power and attempt to destroy it. However, Ryo and Robert have run berserk as well and stand in their way.
22	22	"R"	Unknown	Unknown	December 28, 2017
Fighters have been released from the evil mindcontrol by breaking the generator. Kyo and Terry head to the bridge in order to put a period to this incident. The organiser, R finally appears in their way and now the story of the KOF goes to the end…!
23	23	"Rugal Bernstein"	Unknown	Unknown	January 11, 2018
Rugal is behind the KOF, using it to take control of the fighters by using the Black Crystals. Kyo and Terry cooperate to try and take down Rugal. However, they are forced into a desperate situation when faced with Rugal's overwhelming power and stone-cold killer instincts.
24	24	"Destiny"	Unknown	Unknown	January 18, 2018
Rugal has achieved the power of a god and the fighters try their best to take him down. Revenge, love, hate, ambition…THE KING OF FIGHTERS gets chaotic in this final epic battle! The destinies of these KOF fighters cross and give birth to a new history!

== Production ==
Destiny was first announced in March 2017 by SNK. IDragons were honored to produce the web series based on all the recommendations they got from other people. Since The King of Fighters was commonly known for being 2D game, iDragons decided to make it a 3D series. In order to generate appealing fights, the development team bought an arcade game machine. The artists and scriptwriters were ordered to play every day. Aware that The King of Fighters was also famous for its characters, iDragons produced side stories centered around backstories. In regards to the plot, the team decided to incorporate elements from another SNK franchise, Fatal Fury, alongside The King of Fighters believing fans were also looking forward to it. The answer to the first-season cliffhanger remains as a secret according to the team.

=== Release ===
In the West it began being released for free watching on August 3, 2017, on Steam and August 10, 2017, on YouTube. In China it was broadcast on Youku, Bilibili, Tencent Video, iQIYI and Mango TV. The series' first season of 24 episodes ended on January 18, 2018.

The King of Fighters: Destiny is a tie-in for the SNK video game The King of Fighters: World (along with Tencent's mobile game also titled The King of Fighters: Destiny).

In January 2018, it was announced it is going to be followed by two more seasons and then a feature-length film, adapting the Orochi storyline, that is the early KOF games' plot from The King of Fighters '94 to The King of Fighters '97, without any dates. The first film The King of Fighters: Awaken was scheduled to be released in 2022.

== Reception ==
The King of Fighters: Destiny earned mixed responses by reviewers. Kyo's portrayal in The King of Fighters: Destiny received better response due to the plot not solely focusing on his history but also other characters from the games. While finding the story dated, NSVMundoGeek considered it one of the best adaptations of The King of Fighters franchise, comparing it favourably in contrast to the live-action film that received negative reviews. IGN France reviewer was disappointed by the first three episodes, citing varying quality of graphics and his opinion inadequate sound, even as he enjoyed the mix of action and Chinese humor. Hogan Reviews enjoyed the handling of the cast as both Terry Bogard and Kyo possess their own stories across the narrative with their personalities also balancing each other. He rated it four out of five, stating he was looking forward for a sequel. Corey Lanier from Shoryuken enjoyed the climax and finale for the presentation of the fight between Kyo and Rugal and looked forward to see similar works in the future and bring Iori Yagami into the series.

The series was well received in China, winning the China Games Billboard 2018 award for most popular game-based animation.
