= The King of Fighters '98 =

1998 video game

The King of Fighters '98: The Slugfest
- Artwork for arcade and console releases
- Developer: SNK (Note: Ported to PlayStation by TUG and Yumekobo)
- Publisher: SNK
- Director: Toyohisa Tanabe
- Producer: Takashi Nishiyama
- Designers: Akiko Yukawa; Chikara Yamasaki; Hiroto Kittaka
- Programmers: S. Fujinuki; Souta Ichino
- Artist: Toshiaki Mori
- Composers: Hideki Asanaka; Marimo; Yasuo Yamate
- Series: The King of Fighters
- Platform: Arcade: Neo Geo AES, Neo Geo CD, PlayStation, Dreamcast
- Release: July 23, 1998: Arcade; WW: July 23, 1998 Neo Geo AES; WW: September 23, 1998 Neo Geo CD; WW: December 23, 1998 PlayStation; JP: March 25, 1999 Dream Match 1999 Dreamcast; JP: June 24, 1999; NA: October 16, 1999
- Genre: Fighting
- Modes: Single-player, multiplayer
- Arcade system: Neo Geo MVS

The King of Fighters '98: The Slugfest (KOF '98), known in Japan as The King of Fighters '98: Dream Match Never Ends, is a 1998 fighting game developed and published by SNK for the Neo Geo arcade and home systems. It is the fifth game in The King of Fighters series and features most of the characters who appeared in the previous games, from The King of Fighters '94 to The King of Fighters '97. The game provides no storyline in contrast to the previous installments. Instead, The player selects a team of three characters to participate in The King of Fighters tournament until they reach the boss Rugal Bernstein, even though the character dies in The King of Fighters '95. Two fighting styles can be selected, and several characters have alternate versions to select with their classic moves from previous games.

SNK released nearly all the characters who had participated in KOF at once and then repeatedly considered who to bring back. During this process, the developers also took users' opinions into consideration. Rugal was included due to the original creator's passion for him. Following its release, it was ported to the PlayStation in Japan, while an updated Dreamcast port titled The King of Fighters: Dream Match 1999 was released in 1999, featuring remade 3D backgrounds.

The game was well received by critics and fans and is often considered one of the best The King of Fighters games ever, as well as one of the best fighting games of all time due to its large number of playable characters and proper balance. It sold over 100,000 copies in Japan. A novelization was written by Akihiko Ureshino. It was followed next year by The King of Fighters '99 with the new lead K' in the NESTS story arc; SNK also produced multiple spin-offs focused on Kyo Kusanagi. The game was remade as The King of Fighters '98 Ultimate Match in 2008.

== Gameplay ==
A match between Rugal Bernstein and Yashiro Nanakase battling in Advanced Mode

Similar to previous The King of Fighters games, The King of Fighters '98 is a 2D fighting game where the player forms a team with three characters to form a team and use special moves and combos to defeat other teams formed by A.I. or other players. Whichever team retains the most members at the end of the match wins.

The gameplay does not differ much from the previous game, The King of Fighters '97. As in KOF '97, the player has a choice between two playing styles: Advance and Extra, with a few slight modifications to Advanced mode. This time, when one character loses a round, the losing team is given a handicap in its favor. In Advanced mode, this means that the player's stock capacity for Power Gauges increases by one. In Extra mode, the time it takes to charge one's power gauge to maximum level is shortened, and the maximum remaining health requirement for a MAX Super Special Move is increased.

The game lacks a story; nevertheless, it uses the characters Shingo Yabuki from KOF '97 as an unlockable midboss and Omega Rugal from KOF '95 as the final boss.

The Dreamcast port can be linked to the spin-off game King of Fighters R-2 which allows the player to unlock new content based on their performance in the latter.

== Characters ==
All the regular characters from the previous game return, along with several characters from preceding installments. Rugal Bernstein from KOF '94 also returns as a Team Edit character, with his alter-ego Omega Rugal (the cyborg version of Rugal from KOF '95) serving as the game's final boss in the Single Player Mode. Shingo Yabuki from KOF '97 continues as a Team Edit character but also appears as a mid-boss character during the Arcade Mode. Additionally, the game includes EX versions of certain characters, i.e., alternate versions of characters who use movesets from previous games.

Japan Team

- Kyo Kusanagi
- Benimaru Nikaido
- Goro Daimon

Fatal Fury Team

- Terry Bogard
- Andy Bogard
- Joe Higashi

Art of Fighting Team

- Ryo Sakazaki
- Robert Garcia
- Yuri Sakazaki

Ikari Warriors Team

- Leona Heidern
- Ralf Jones
- Clark Still

Psycho Soldier Team

- Athena Asamiya
- Sie Kensou
- Chin Gentsai

Women Fighters Team

- Chizuru Kagura
- Mai Shiranui
- King

Korea Justice Team

- Kim Kaphwan
- Chang Koehan
- Choi Bounge

New Faces Team

- Yashiro Nanakase
- Shermie
- Chris

Outlaw Team ('97 Special Team)

- Ryuji Yamazaki
- Blue Mary
- Billy Kane

Yagami Team

- Iori Yagami
- Mature
- Vice

Masters Team

- Heidern
- Takuma Sakazaki
- Saisyu Kusanagi

American Sports Team

- Heavy D
- Lucky Glauber
- Brian Battler

Single Entry

- Rugal Bernstein
- Shingo Yabuki

Boss

- Omega Rugal

Hidden characters

- EX Joe Higashi
- EX Ryo Sakazaki
- EX Yuri Sakazaki
- EX Robert Garcia
- EX Kyo Kusanagi
- EX Terry Bogard
- EX Andy Bogard
- EX Mai Shiranui
- EX Billy Kane
- Orochi Yashiro
- Orochi Shermie
- Orochi Chris

== Development ==
The King of Fighters '98 was directed by Toyohisa Tanabe who had previously created the battle system and also directed The King of Fighters '97. Following the release of The King of Fighters '97 the Orochi story arc of the series had ended. Therefore, SNK wanted to give the series a different nature with this new installment. Originally, KOF itself was a series that started with the basic concept of something special; as it progressed, it gradually began to have its own unique storyline. Therefore, there was no story for '98; nevertheless, various playable characters returned from previous stories. This is the first time the KOF series has had a subtitle, and the developers wanted to express that it has a different position from previous games. All of the members of the development team had to decide who had participated in KOF. SNK released all the characters who had participated in KOF at once and then repeatedly considered who to bring back. During this process, the developers also took users' opinions into consideration, especially in the Neo Geo Freak magazine. Rugal Bernstein is included due to the original creator's passion for him. Since this game lacked a storyline, the SNK staff decided to bring back Rugal as the boss character, noting that "he's the only character who truly represents the ultimate KOF boss". Additionally, some of his special moves were redesigned, which the staff found to have made him the strongest version of Rugal and one of their favorites.

Shinkiro kept being the series's artist, with KOF '98 remaining one of his most famous works. The game was ported to several more consoles than previous installments thanks to the new Neo Geo consoles as well as Sony's and Sega's. Director Toyohisa Tanabe had negative thoughts about this game due to SNK going bankrupt during its release, as SNK would close all of its American operations. While the American Sports Team was not as popular as the other cast members, SNK still paid attention to their detail by producing new sprites and special moves. There was also a more careful approach to drawing the characters during their victory screens compared to previous installments. The victory screens were based on a challenge image used for a bonus fight against Shingo Yabuki. The big aim was to bring back old characters. The same applied to Vice and Mature, who were given new moves. Balancing the game required an entire mode. In The King of Fighters '96, several moves from protagonist Kyo Kusanagi were changed in order to adapt him to the new game system. The original moveset was still popular among gamers, and as such, an alternative version of Kyo was added to The King of Fighters '97. The introduction of this version was noted to be "a hit" among gamers, so the staff kept adding new alternative versions of other characters in KOF '98.

== Release ==
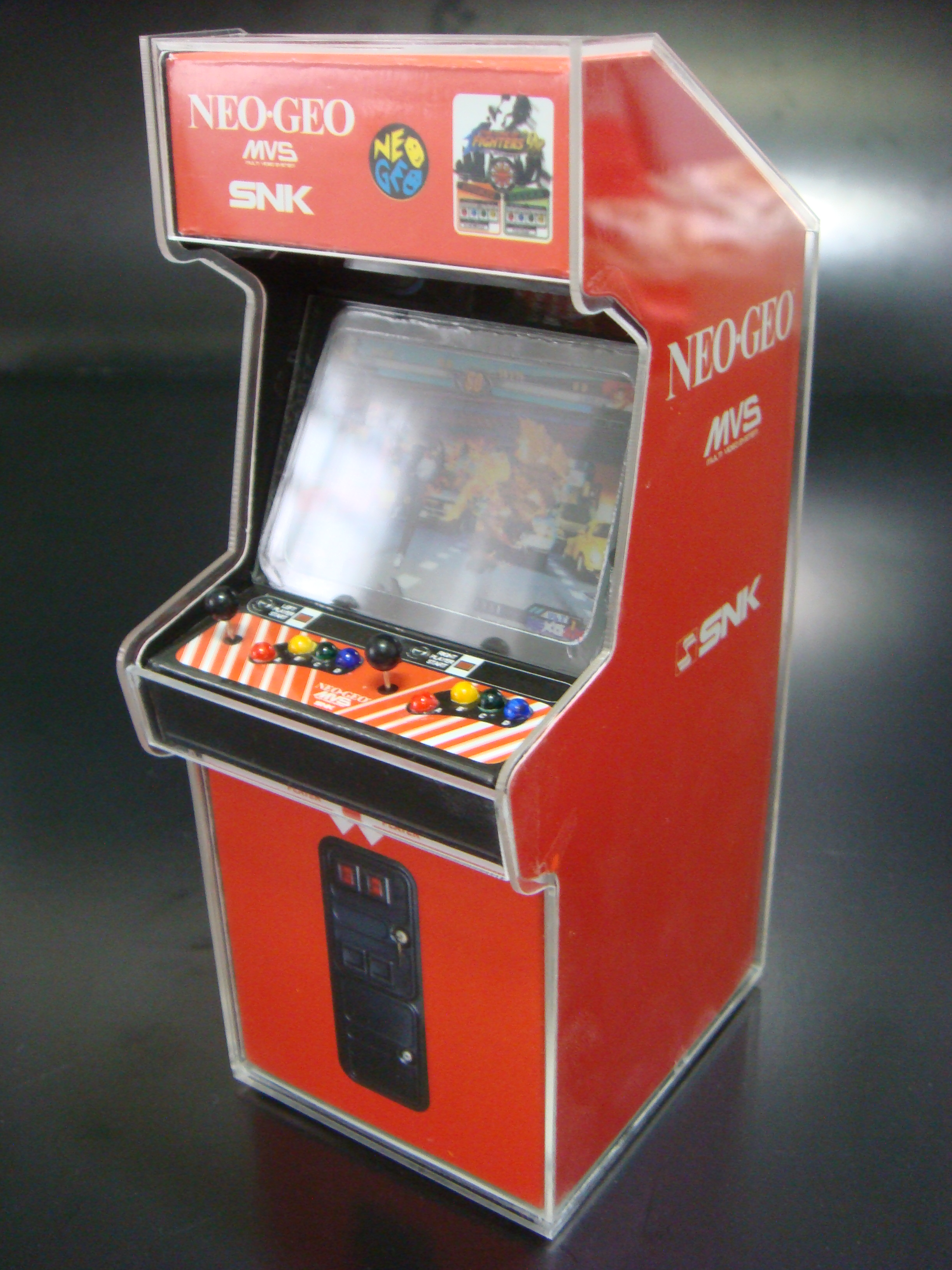
A Neo Geo arcade cabinet running the game

KOF '98 was originally released for arcades on July 23, 1998. It was also released for the Neo Geo AES on September 23, 1998, the Neo-Geo CD on December 23, 1998, and the PlayStation on March 25, 1999. In promoting the game for Sony's PlayStation, an image of Kyo Kusanagi was made by Shinkiro in a passive state, which would change to his eyes open when the game was ported to the console. In promoting the "Dream Match", Shinkiro's illustrations also led to characters in a calm state while wearing formal clothes even if they do not fit.

An updated Dreamcast version was released on June 24, 1999, under the title The King of Fighters: Dream Match 1999, reflecting the year the version was released. It came out in North America on October 16, 1999. It features remade 3D backdrops and runs at 60 frames per second. This version also featured its own animated intro, produced by the studio Digimation K.K.. It heavily focuses on the rivalry between Kyo and Iori.

An emulated version of the game was released as part of The King of Fighters Collection: The Orochi Saga in 2008 for the PlayStation 2, PlayStation Portable, and Wii. The Neo Geo AES version was added via emulation to the Wii Virtual Console in 2013. Another emulated version was released for iOS and Android in 2014. Hamster Corporation re-released the game as part of their ACA Neo Geo series for the PlayStation 4, Xbox One, Nintendo Switch, Windows, Android and iOS, as well as their ACA Neo Geo 2 series for the PlayStation 5 and Xbox Series X/S.

== Reception ==
=== Sales ===
Reception

Aggregate scores
Aggregator	Score
GameRankings	DC: 71%
Metacritic	iOS: 78/100; NS: 80/100

Review scores
Publication	Score
GameSpot	8.6/10 (DC)
IGN	8.4/10 (DC)
Next Generation	2/5 (DC)
Nintendo Life	9/10 (Switch)
Nintendo World Report	8/10 (Switch)
The Guardian	3/5 (IOS)
TouchArcade	3.5/5 (iOS)
Gaming Age	B (DC)
DigitallyDownloaded	4/5 (Switch)

The King of Fighters '98 was well-received in Japan. Game Machine listed it in its September 1, 1998, issue as the most successful arcade game of the month. According to Famitsu, the AES version sold over 22,651 copies in its first week on the market. During its release week, the Dreamcast version of the game sold 58,354 copies in Japan. As of 2004, the sales increased to 104,049. It has therefore also been labeled as a "greatest hits" game. In the Gamest awards of 1998, the game took second place, beating Street Fighter Alpha 3 and losing to Psychic Force 2012.

In Brazil, the Dreamcast version, The King of Fighters: Dream Match 1999, was the sixth-best-selling Dreamcast game distributed by Tec Toy, according to a sales ranking compiled by Tec Toy marketing analyst Kleber de Almeida and published by UOL in November 2004.

=== Critical response ===
The game often received positive responses from critics who mainly focused on the Dreamcast port of the arcade. In GameRankings it has a 71% out of 19 reviews. Jeremy Dunham from IGN gave the game an 8.4, praising, in addition to the gameplay and characters, the graphics, music, and background designs added for the Dreamcast version. However, he was disappointed by the lack of story in the game, noting that the stories from previous games were very entertaining. GameSpot's Jeff Gerstmann found it to be one of the best 2D fighting games, noting that although new players may find it hard to play due to the difficulty of executing various special moves and how difficult the opponent AI is. Andy Chien from Gaming Age found that the Dreamcast port of the game was well done since it did not have the disadvantages it had on other consoles; he noted it "could have been a lot better". He also found that the game had a bug when he tried to perform a special move from Mai Shiranui, which, unlike the other versions, is very inconsistent. In a more critical response, Tom Russo reviewed the Dreamcast version of the game for Next Generation, claiming it is only appealing nostalgic NeoGeo fighting games' fans.

In regard to more modern ports, reviews have been generally positive according to Metacritic. Tomy Moses from The Guardian found the iOS port enjoyable even if it does not have the same appeal as Street Fighter and lamented the lack of online gameplay. TouchArcade found the iOS port successful in adapting the visuals and handling the input controls but had mixed feelings over the moves being harder to perform than in other famous games such as the Street Fighter series, which employ simpler commands. The Nintendo Switch port was also highly praised by Nintendo Life, who found it faithful to the original Neo Geo game, especially due to the fame it earned in later years. Nintendo World Report recognized it as one of the best Switch fighters, commenting on its large cast of characters, visuals, and simplistic gameplay. Despite praising the characters and controls, Havard L. from DigitallDownloaded criticized the lack of narrative, claiming it would be bad for newcomers.

In retrospect, The King of Fighters '98 is often recognized as the best entry in the series, as well as one of the greatest fighting games of all time, such as Time Extension, Hardcore Gaming 101 and Nintendo Life. The game also received praise from 1UP.com writer Richard Li, who found it to be the most balanced game from the KOF series due to improved mechanics from previous titles. During a review of the compilation The King of Fighters: The Orochi Saga, Matt Edwards from Eurogamer noted KOF '98 to be the most enjoyable game of the collection as well as the most famous game in the series "that really made people stand up and take an interest in the series". The presentation stood out according to 1UP.com due to Shinkiro's promotional artwork for the game. While Game Rant criticized its poor localization, citing Ryo Sakazaki's victory quote as one of the weirdest translations in gaming, Hardcore Gaming 101 said the Dreamcast port's translation was more accurate than previous installments. Conexion Manga praised the lengthy anime introduction for how it shows the series' potential to become a television series similar to how the spin-off The King of Fighters: Kyo featured these types of clips.

== Legacy ==
The game was followed by The King of Fighters '99. Hiroyuki Kono from SNK said that with The King of Fighters '99, the team was trying to provide new content that previous games lacked. Kono thought of the Striker idea as a change to the franchise in general. With the Striker system, where the fourth character assisted the playable character, SNK aimed to give the player new ideas for combos. However, it still brought several challenges. The story of the new protagonist K' in The King of Fighters '99 is set to be the beginning.

A spin-off game The King of Fighters EX: Neo Blood stars where Kyo Kusanagi and fellow newcomer Moe Hibana star as the leads despite using the same game design as The King of Fighters '99. The Chinese comic The King of Fighters Zillion also follows an alternate narrative involving the Orochi cast but during the NESTS story arc.
