= Buriki One =

1999 video game

Buriki One: World Grapple Tournament '99 in Tokyo
- Arcade flyer featuring Gai Tendo
- Developer: SNK
- Publisher: SNK
- Director: Takashi Tsukamoto
- Platform: Arcade
- Release: JP: May 21, 1999
- Genre: Fighting
- Modes: Single-player, multiplayer
- Arcade system: Hyper Neo Geo 64

Buriki One: World Grapple Tournament '99 in Tokyo, otherwise known simply as Buriki One (Japanese: 武力 ONE), is a 1999 fighting game developed and published by SNK for arcades. It is the seventh and final game developed for SNK's short-lived Hyper Neo Geo 64 hardware and like most games released for the platform, it has never been officially ported to home consoles. The game features 12 martial artists, all released exclusively for the game with the exception of Ryo Sakazaki, a guest character originating from SNK's franchise Art of Fighting. The gameplay involves a realistic design than the ones explored in previous IPs created by the company; this modification resulted in the game featuring struggles and grabs similar to wrestling games, without super moves like projectiles. The story involves a tournament from 1999 in Tokyo where the twelve characters compete to decide who has the best martial art skills.

Buriki One was primarily designed by Hiroaki Hashimoto, who worked as motion capture artist and created most of the fighters while studying martial arts. The inclusion of Ryo Sakazaki in an older version of himself than the one seen in Art of Fighting was Hashimoto's own idea in order to make him more fearsome based on his personal taste.

Although the game was never released in Western regions, several game journalists have regarded the gameplay as one of SNK's most unique works for being so different from their previous IPs. The characters of Gai Tendo and Silber have also been featured as guest characters in SNK's fighting game The King of Fighters XI, while Ryo's older persona has also been featured in other SNK's titles as a stronger alter ego.

== Gameplay ==
Example of a Buriki One fight

Buriki One is a one-on-one fighting game whose controls are a departure from traditional works by SNK. The control system uses two buttons for movement, keeping the player on a 2-D axis. Pressing the left button moves the character in the left direction and pressing the right moves in that direction. Double tapping each button produces a dash in each corresponding direction, used for evasion and closing distance. Pressing both buttons makes the character block.

By using the joystick, the player can execute attacks of varying damage levels. By pressing the joystick in the forward direction, the player executes a medium attack, up-forward produces a stronger attack, and down-forward gives the weakest, but fastest, attack. By combining various movements of the stick, special attacks can be performed for increased damage. Unlike common fighting games, however, no ranged attacks are present, keeping the preferred fighting distance between players at close quarters.

A fighter can win by knocking out his opponent, forcing his opponent to surrender, or by winning a judgment by a panel of three judges if time runs out. The judges are allowed to cast ballots for either fighter or a tie ballot that does not contribute to the decision. A tie will force a player to either give up or buy a continue. Should a fighter fall outside of the ring, the fight is paused until both fighters are sent back into the ring to resume the fight. Only the winner of the World Grapple Tournament can participate in the finals of each qualifying round. In order to enter the finals, the player must win three matches in the first round.

== Plot and characters ==
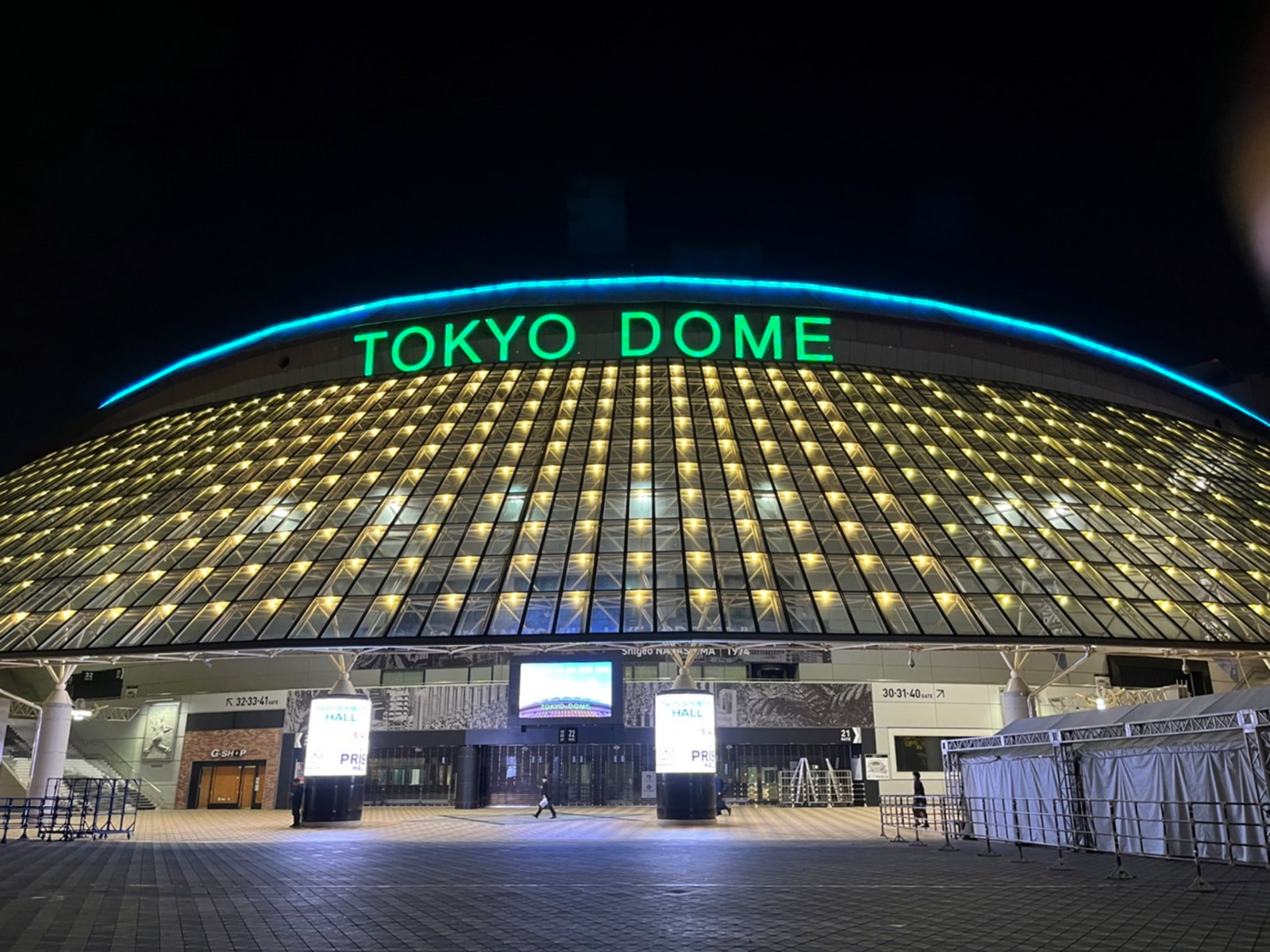
The game takes place in the Tokyo Dome.

The game is set in 1999 as fighters from across the world gather at the Tokyo Dome to compete in the World Grapple Tournament. Each contender has their own fighting discipline, ranging from the popular styles of boxing, karate and professional wrestling to the lesser known arts of aikido, tai chi and Muay Thai. The winner will prove their fighting style is the superior one. The fighters are:

- Gai Tendo - The lead protagonist, a 17-year-old fighter who uses a self-styled martial art. He has been training by himself at Okinawa ever since graduating middle school. Character voiced by Nobuyuki Hiyama.
- Rob Python - A 35-year-old super heavyweight boxer residing in LA. Character voice (CV): Kōji Ishii
- Jacques Ducalis - A 32-year-old open-weight Gold medalist and current Director of the French judo Society. CV: Eiji Tsuda
- Seo Yong Song - An 18-year-old taekwondo master who was the Middleweight champion in the World Taekwondo Championship during the previous year. Currently attending college with a major in quantum physics. CV: Jun Hashimoto
- Takato Saionji - A 17-year-old private high school student from Kyoto who has thoroughly mastered aikido with help from his grandfather, Takayuki. CV: Eiji Yano
- Payak Sitpitak - A 40-year-old Muay Thai ranker who is the currently the Top Welterweight athlete in the Muay Thai circuit. CV:Atsushi Yamanishi
- Song Xuandao - A 70-year-old tai chi master who is well known within the Chinese fighting world. CV: Keiichiro Sakagi
- Patrick Van Heyting - A 37-year-old popular pro wrestler from the Netherlands. CV: Franky Nakamura
- Ivan Sokolov - A 27-year-old freestyle wrestler and a 191-pound class Gold Medalist. Despite his rough style, he has won against his opponents due to his technical skills. CV: Hiroyuki Arita
- Akatsuki-Maru - A 28-year-old sumo wrestler who currently holds the title of Sekiwake. (Note: Sekiwake is the third highest rank in Sumo, behind only Yokozuna (the highest rank in Sumo) and Ōzeki (the second highest rank in Sumo).) CV: Eiji Yano
- Ryo Sakazaki - The 32-year-old instructor of the Kyokugen School of karate. Originally the main character from the Art of Fighting series. CV: Masaki Usui.
- Silber - The final boss in the game. A one-eyed martial artist from Germany who uses his own style of karate. Although Silber has never officially competed in a fighting tournament, he has been sighted in numerous parts of the world over the past 30 years, fighting against many well-known martial artists. Silber is a computer-only character initially and only becomes a controllable character after the computer-controlled Silber is defeated by the player with each of the other characters. CV: Hiroyuki Arita

== Development ==
Sketches of the cast of Buriki One by Hiroaki Hashimoto featuring from the top: Gai Tendo, Ryo Sakazaki, Payak, Sitipak, Seo Yong-Song, Ivan Sokolov, Rob Python. In the bottom: Akatsuki-Maru, Saionji Takato, Jacques Ducalis, Song Xuandao, Patrick Van Heyting and Silber.

There was little known the game's content in early promotion of the series, except that the game would feature Ryo Sakazaki as well as a protagonist named Gai Tendo who used self-taught martial arts. A major part of the game's development was to make to emphasize realism. According to SNK, the game focused on "more realistic fighting" and employed a completely new control system that was carefully designed. In Ryo's case, his gameplay was developed to convey a sense of realism, to the point he cannot perform projectile maneuvers that might appear in other games. One of the defining features of this game is the incorporation of television-style direction throughout. For example, the pre-match introductions of the fighters are designed to resemble actual television broadcasts of martial arts tournaments. Furthermore, the staff roll, which resembles the staff credits of a television program.

Buriki One was the only title Hiroaki Hashimoto was involved in from the early stages of development to release while at SNK, and he participated in a wide range of aspects of the game development, from design to motion capture. Gai was greatly influenced by former Shooto Lightweight Champion Rumina Sato, mixed martial artist Kazushi Sakuraba, and the protagonist of the Baki the Grappler manga series, Baki Hanma. Hashimoto gave the protagonist red hair in the belief that it symbolized champions and represented his personality well.

Several characters and settings were made before Hashimoto joined the development of the game, but after his inclusion, he was given free rein. Hashimoto did still do several retakes in order to be faithful to other developers' ideas. Hashimoto had to research Muay Thai and Sumo in order to be able to properly create the characters. When it comes to the Karate fighter, Ryo Sakazaki's redesign in his older persona was created by Hashimoto as he disliked the original orange gi and wanted to mix it more with darker colors. Changing the design of a central and popular SNK character like Ryo Sakazaki was risky, but Hashimoto's seniors gave him freedom, though with the stipulation that the design should look "cool". Hashimoto was the model for the protagonist Gai Tendo. Hashimoto aimed to make every character look "cool", which made it easy to draw Rob Python based on Python's charismatic personality.

The concept behind the boss character, Silber, was, "What would happen if a real fighter fought a fighting game character?"; SNK's staff members started by coming up with ideas to make a character that looked scary and strong. Silber's design started from there, so at first it was "spiky silver hair", but at the time there was a limit to the number of polygons that could be displayed, so Hashimoto was told "Make it three spikes on the head!" and panicked. In the end, Hashimoto begged and the team settled on the final hairstyle. There was also a competition of "Buriki Girls" in which fans voted. The five who beat out the strong competition to become "Buriki Girls" were Tono, Sakai, Koda, Marugame, and Sakurada.

== Reception ==
=== Response ===
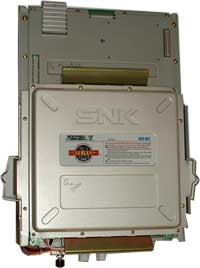
The poor performance of the Hyper Neo Geo 64 led to the game's obscure status outside Japan.

Ryo's inclusion in the game led to rumors in Japan that the game was originally going to be called "Art of Fighting 4" by Video Games Magazine who noted that players would have to get used to its innovative gameplay style to beat it, comparing it to boxing. However, the fact that the game was originally designed to appeal to arcades made it feel difficult for the game to be ported. In Japan, Game Machine listed Buriki One in their June 15, 1999 issue as being the most-successful arcade game of the month. Despite lacking console ports and fame outside Japan, Buriki One was praised by trade writers as an obscure fighting game that nevertheless has a notable fighting system different from other IPs. The game was mentioned by GameDeveloper for its realistic style, similar to the samurai game Bushido Blade; GameDeveloper found it different from previous SNK games that had repeatedly used the same 2D fighting game designs, instead feeling like a wrestling game. Nevertheless, they still felt that mastering the gameplay took time.

Time Extension said the game lacked fame due to the poor execution of the Hyper Neo Geo 64 arcade system but that the gameplay still stood out thanks to the layout involving punches and kicks. This has led to years of players looking for means to properly emulate the game's control system. Game Hihyou called it a departure from common fighting games as a result of how it works. They praised the design that allows players to launch a big attack with little effort instead of relying on human thought and reaction. However, they felt the game took some time to get used to. They found the martial arts enjoyable as well, instead of just the characters. It was also noted that the control system allowed players to reset their control skills. Player One also found it different from traditional fighting games due to the depth explored in the martial arts and rules. The writer also found the character designs more realistic and mature, using Ryo as an example due to how different are his techniques from supermoves seen in previous games. MSN referred to Buriki One as "SNK’s only attempt at creating a somewhat realistic fighting game", and thus, like other website journalists, considered the product outstanding, citing the control and conditions to win fights. Den of Geek considered the boss character Silber as "a ripped off" Akuma from the Street Fighter fighting game series by Capcom, but still found his design and moves be appealing enough to persuade longtime fans to enjoy seeing him in SNK's fighting game The King of Fighters XI as a guest character.

=== Legacy ===
GameRant said the game should be re-released in modern consoles owing to its notorious release in Japanese arcades. Hashimoto said he wanted Gai in The King of Fighters, which became true in The King of Fighters 2000, where Gai was a side character. Gai became a fully playable character in The King of Fighters XI. The addition of mid-bosses from Buriki One in KOF was meant to surprise gamers; since those bosses' original moves did not "fit" in The King of Fighters XI, developers had to change some of them. Ryo in Buriki One received this response especially from older gamers, based on SNK artist Falcoon's illustration of him of his black gi with the artist aiming to model after the black gi from the Netflix TV series Cobra Kai. For the SNK crossover game NeoGeo Battle Coliseum, Ryo was chosen to be playable based on his Buriki One persona but with his father's nickname, "Mr. Karate". This game used its own type of supermoves rather than the realistic style of Buriki One. In 2016, Watanabe said he wanted to make a new Buriki One now that consoles came with two analog sticks. He thought the game could be refined for more fun. Game designer Yasuyuki Oda said that creating another Buriki One was possible in 2023. Hiroaki expressed shock upon reading the interview about a new Buriki One being possible. Den of Geek said that Buriki One is remembered by fans due to its first depiction of Ryo as a middle-aged man; they lamented that fellow game character Gai Tendo did not have outstanding moves in The King of Fighters XI despite having a lively personality there.
