= The King of Fighters '95 =

1995 video game

- European arcade flyer, featuring Kyo Kusanagi
- Developer: SNK: Rutubo Games (Saturn) Gaibrain (Game Boy)
- Publishers: SNK: Game Boy; JP: Takara; NA: Nintendo; EU: Laguna PlayStation; JP: SNK; WW: Sony Computer Entertainment
- Director: Masanori Kuwasashi
- Producers: Eikichi Kawasaki; Takashi Nishiyama
- Designers: Akihiko Nasu; Akiko Yukawa; Chikara Yamasaki
- Programmers: Khozoh Nagashima; S. Fujinuki
- Artist: Toshiaki Mori
- Composers: Akihiro Uchida; Masahiko Hataya; Pearl Sibakiti
- Series: The King of Fighters
- Platforms: Arcade, Game Boy, Neo Geo AES, Neo Geo CD, PlayStation, Sega Saturn
- Release: July 25, 1995: Arcade; JP: July 25, 1995 Neo Geo AES; NA/JP: September 1, 1995 Neo Geo CD; JP: September 29, 1995 Saturn; JP: March 28, 1996; EU: July 4, 1997 Game Boy; JP: April 26, 1996; NA: February 1997 PlayStation; JP: June 28, 1996; NA: September 18, 1996
- Genre: Fighting
- Modes: Single-player, multiplayer
- Arcade system: Neo Geo MVS

The King of Fighters '95 (Note: Japanese: ザ・キング・オブ・ファイターズ'95, Hepburn: Za Kingu Obu Faitāzu '95), also shortened as KOF '95, is a 1995 fighting video game developed and published by SNK for the Neo Geo arcade and home platforms. It is the sequel to The King of Fighters '94, and the second installment in The King of Fighters series. The game features a similar cast to KOF '94 with the exception of the USA Team, which was replaced by the Rival Team. The plot features a new King of Fighters tournament once again promoted by the criminal Rugal Bernstein, who seeks revenge against the protagonist Kyo Kusanagi, who defeated him in last year's tournament. KOF '95 marks the first appearance of the fighter Iori Yagami from the Rival Team, who becomes Kyo's rival in the series.

It is also the first game in the series to be ported to other home consoles besides the Neo Geo AES and Neo Geo CD, with versions released for the PlayStation, Sega Saturn and Game Boy. One of the main focuses in the creation of "Orochi arc" for which director Masanori Kuwasashi used Saisyu's return, Iori's introduction and Rugal's stronger form to create a more coherent narrative than in the previous game. Gameplay remains similar to the first KOF game, with SNK working to balance the original gameplay with the new team feature as well as each character's expanded moveset.

The King of Fighters '95 received positive reviews in the arcade and consoles, but mixed reviews for the PlayStation, with critics praising the gameplay and new characters but criticizing the game's controls and long loading times. The game was followed by The King of Fighters '96, which continued the "Orochi Saga" that concluded with The King of Fighters '97. The game sold over 700,000 copies.

== Gameplay ==
Gameplay screenshot showcasing a match between Athena Asamiya and Iori Yagami.

The King of Fighters '95 is a 2D fighting game with gameplay and rules that are mostly unchanged from its predecessor, The King of Fighters '94. Players choose a team of three members and compete against others until all three characters are defeated using taunts, special moves and combos. The dodge and counterattack mechanics were revised, resulting in better reactions from the fighters.

The main addition is the introduction of the Team Edit feature, allowing the player to create a custom team from any of the game's twenty-four characters in addition to the pre-defined teams in the game. Through the main play mode, players must defeat all other teams in order to fight the bosses: the elder Saisyu Kusanagi, followed by a stronger Rugal Bernstein.

== Plot and characters ==
A year after the events of The King of Fighters '94, a new fighting tournament is sponsored by the anonymous "R" who seeks revenge. Rugal Bernstein, thought to have perished in an explosion in the previous game, had in fact survived and sent out invitations to the teams from the previous game signed simply "R". The story introduces the newcomers from the rival team who have a vendetta with different competitors: Iori Yagami wants to kill the champion Kyo Kusanagi, Eiji Kisaragi wishes to beat the Kyokugen Ryu martial artists from the Art of Fighting Team and Billy Kane wants to kill the member from the Fatal Fury Team in place of his leader Geese Howard. Saisyu Kusanagi, Kyo's father, appears as a fighter for the first time, having survived being beaten by Rugal Bernstein and serving him. After defeating Saisyu in the arcade mode, Saisyu will ask his son to defeat Rugal. Following his defeat, Rugal loses control of his powers which consume him and kill him. In Kyo's ending, it is revealed that Saisyu survived, and he says his son still has a fight against his fate.

Hero Team

- Kyo Kusanagi
- Benimaru Nikaido
- Goro Daimon

Fatal Fury Team

- Terry Bogard
- Andy Bogard
- Joe Higashi

Art of Fighting Team

- Ryo Sakazaki
- Robert Garcia
- Takuma Sakazaki

Ikari Warriors Team

- Heidern
- Ralf Jones
- Clark Still

Psycho Soldier Team

- Athena Asamiya
- Sie Kensou
- Chin Gentsai

Korea Justice Team

- Kim Kaphwan
- Chang Koehan
- Choi Bounge

Women Fighters Team

- Yuri Sakazaki
- Mai Shiranui
- King

Rivals Team

- Iori Yagami (new character)
- Billy Kane (new character)
- Eiji Kisaragi (new character)

Mid-Boss

- Saisyu Kusanagi (new character)

Final Boss

- Omega Rugal (new character)

== Development ==
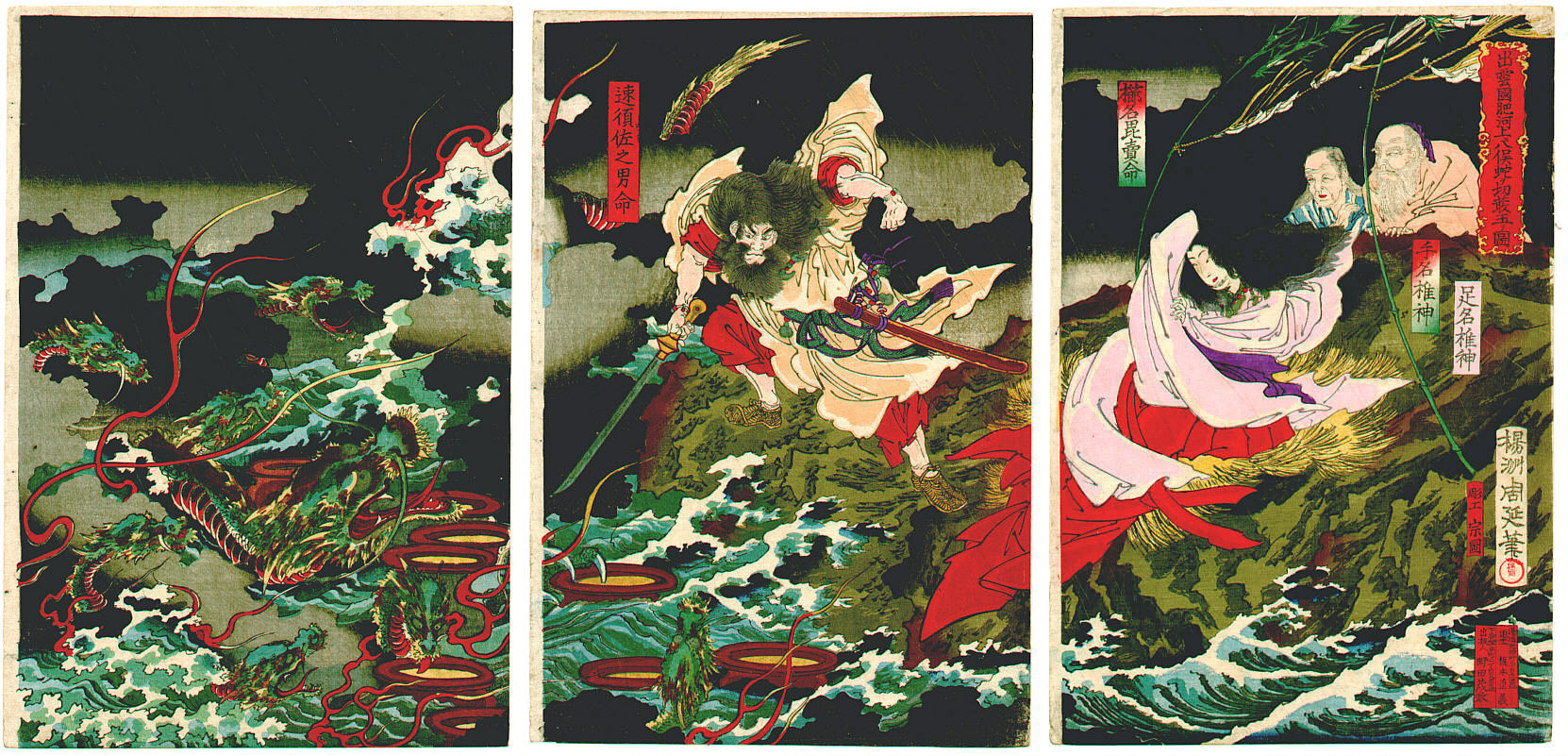
Director Masanori Kuwahashi wrote the rivalry between the returning herom Kyo Kusanagi and the new character Iori Yagami (top) inspired by the Yamata no Orochi myth (bottom).

The King of Fighters '95 was directed by Masanori Kuwasashi, who was behind the previous installment, The King of Fighters '94. Production took place at SNK's headquarters in Osaka. Creation of the game started shortly after winter 1994 when The King of Fighters '94 was released. The staff was tired from developing the first game, and came up with new ideas far more challenging. The initial plan for the sequel was more fun that incorporated more ideas than the previous game. The staff chose from as many ideas as possible to fit into a set schedule, and worked hard every day, cutting down on sleep, but there were quite a few elements that they had to cut down on due to time constraints. The trial and error of figuring out the order to bring them in within a fixed team—that was what made the original game appealing. The entire The King of Fighters '95 was meant to be a remake of The King of Fighters '94 but issues with time scheduling and balancing resulted in the similarities between both installments. An important concept for the game was to bring team editing to the forefront and give players more freedom to play. The team introduced new features, including the counterattack, which was an improved version of the dodge attack that was difficult to execute in "'94" and was arranged in the KOF style.

Protagonist Kyo Kusanagi was given a new move to show his dedication to fights; the duo of Ryo Sakazaki and Robert Garcia from Art of Fighting were revised as they were considered overpowered. The time spent on balance adjustments was longer compared to the previous game. The team had learned from their experience balancing the previous installment, which helped the process move faster. The CPU fighters in "'94" were easily trapped in fairly simple strategies, so the team sought to make the computer's movements as difficult as possible to defeat with just one pattern. The team also was careful to balance the sexualization of Mai Shiranui with the younger Athena Asamiya. Kuwahashi also came up with the idea of letting the player create their own teams in the form of the Edit Team feature rather than using the same fixed teams as usual, which resulted in him consulting producer Takashi Nishiyama about it. The team considered including Samurai Shodown characters, but balancing issues and weapons led to their removal. Fatal Fury villain Geese Howard was meant to be playable in the game but such idea was scrapped.

To further develop Kyo, SNK introduced Iori as his rival and made the former's father Saisyu Kusanagi a mid-boss, resulting in the game having a more coherent narrative than the first game. Due to development reasons, the team had to limit the number of teams to eight, and after much deliberation, they decided to cut out the American teams. Saisyu was added late into development as he originally died in The King of Fighters '94 during one of the cut-scenes from the Hero Team. Kuwahashi made the plot which was inspired by the Yamata no Orochi myths as both Kyo and Iori were related to Orochi demon power first seen in this game when Rugal develops his maximum power. During the initial location tests to determine the popularity of the game, Iori was the character who stood out most, and also became a favorite of the developers, due to his violent moves comparable to the ones from Midway's Mortal Kombat fighting game series. To complement the Iori, Eiji Kisaragi from Art of Fighting 2 and Billy Kane and Fatal Fury: King of Fighters were added but their defeat at the hands of Iori in the ending bothered the original designers. A more unusual design, called "Rugal Infinity", would have featured his body merged with Geese and Krauser, appearing as a six-armed naked man with the other two men's faces sticking out of the sides of his head, akin to depictions of the god Ashura. Dubbing him "Omega Rugal", they ultimately settled on an appearance similar to his King of Fighters '94 counterpart.

== Release ==
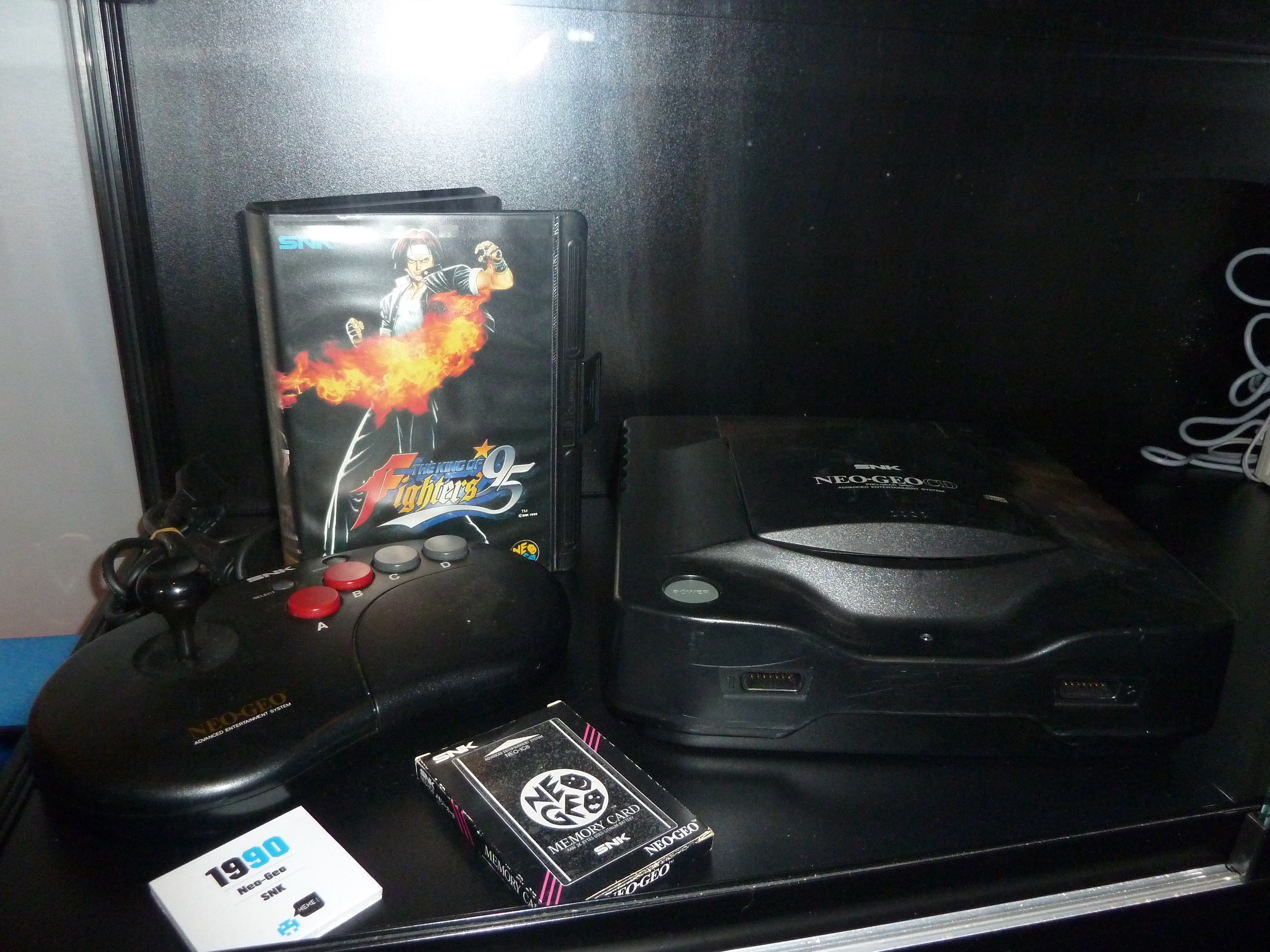
An example of the Neo Geo CD port

The original Japanese arcade version was released on July 25, 1995, and it was ported to the Neo Geo AES and Neo Geo CD later that year. In 1996, the game was ported to the PlayStation and Sega Saturn. A Game Boy Color version was also made, changing the visuals from the original game into a cartoon-like style. A Game Boy game based on The King of Fighters '95 (Nettō The King of Fighters '95 in Japan) was published by Takara in Japan and by Nintendo in North America. It featured compatibility with the Super Game Boy, as well as introducing Nakoruru from the Samurai Shodown series as a secret character.

The King of Fighters '95 was one of the first titles from SNK to be ported to the PlayStation. To improve its appeal to the North American market, SNK added new options to the game that were not present in the original Japanese version, such as selecting stages and improving the grammar and spelling, which was one of the biggest issues from the Neo Geo version. The PlayStation version was published on August 31, 1996, in North America and the PAL region by Sony Computer Entertainment Inc. It featured a remixed soundtrack which took advantage of the Redbook audio format. The PlayStation version was released in Europe ahead of the Saturn version due to a timed exclusivity deal between SNK and Sony Computer Entertainment Europe. The "PlayStation the Best" version was also re-released on March 28, 1997. The Saturn version (which required a ROM cartridge that came packaged with the game disc) was also released in Europe by Sega. The bundled ROM cartridge contains the majority of the character animations. It was the first video game to use a CD-ROM and a ROM cartridge in tandem.

An emulated version of the game was released as part of The King of Fighters Collection: The Orochi Saga in 2008 for the PlayStation 2, PlayStation Portable and Wii. Hamster Corporation re-released the game as part of their ACA Neo Geo series for multiple consoles.

== Reception ==
Reception

Aggregate score
Aggregator	Score
GameRankings	PS1: 69% NeoGeo: 66%

Review scores
Publication	Score
Computer and Video Games	93% (Neo Geo CD)
Electronic Gaming Monthly	31.5/40(Neo Geo)
GameFan	286/300 (Neo Geo)
GamePro	4.5/5(Neo Geo)
GameRevolution	C+ (PlayStation)
GameSpot	5.3/10(PlayStation)
IGN	5.0/10 (PlayStation)
Next Generation	2/5(Neo Geo & PS1)
Dengeki PlayStation	60/100, 50/100, 70/100, 70/100(PlayStation)
Maximum	5/5(Neo Geo CD)
Sega Saturn Magazine	89%(Saturn)

Award
Publication	Award
Electronic Gaming Monthly	Best Neo-Geo Game of 1995

=== Critical reception ===
The King of Fighters '95 received positive reviews upon release. Computer and Video Games magazine acclaimed it as one of the best 2D fighting games. The King of Fighters '95 was awarded Best Neo-Geo Game of 1995 by Electronic Gaming Monthly in 1996, beating Fatal Fury 3: Road to the Final Victory and Samurai Shodown III. The four reviewers of Electronic Gaming Monthly declared the Neo Geo AES version a solid improvement over the previous King of Fighters, particularly applauding the addition of the team edit feature. Major Mike of GamePro agreed that this was the game's best feature, but also expressed approval for the replacement of the U.S. team with the new Rival team and the control modifications. He criticized the game's lack of improvements but enjoyed the combat. A reviewer for Next Generation was unimpressed, however, remarking that despite the innovating team fighting game, it is always one-on-one fight. A reviewer from GameFan considered the game as the best 1995 fighting game behind Street Fighter Alpha as well as the best Neo Geo game. He acclaimed the gameplay and presentation but still found the damage input to be too high.

When it came to the Saturn port, Rich Leadbetter of Sega Saturn Magazine acclaimed such release, criticizing only brief load times. He found the level of skill and technique involved in the game to be both its strongest point and the main limiting factor on its appeal comparable to Capcom's Street Fighter Alpha because the element of skill. Reviewing the Neo Geo CD version, Maximum acclaimed the handling of character sprites in favor of other fighting games. They elaborated that the team combat makes for greater variety than the average fighting game, the team edit feature greatly increases the game's enjoyability and longevity, the unusually high difficulty of executing combos makes pulling them off more satisfying, and the animations are greatly improved from The King of Fighters '94.

The PlayStation version was much less well received, as IGN criticized that the characters were difficult to use due to the controls. However, IGN reviewed the game favorably, especially because of its handling of 2D sprites. A reviewer for Next Generation also said the game lacked originality and was filled with long load times. Jeff Gerstmann from GameSpot also criticized the long loading times from the PlayStation version as well as how frequent they are since every round requires loading time. Game Revolution noted the game to be very entertaining but still not as good as other fighting games from the year it was released in North America. They criticized that the fighting system is very similar to other SNK games such as Fatal Fury and Art of Fighting. However, Scary Larry defended the PlayStation version in GamePro, finding it faithful to the original arcade. Dengeki PlayStation writers were critical port to the high difficulty, loading times and damage caused by techniques.

=== Sales ===
In Japan, Game Machine listed The King of Fighters '95 on their September 1, 1995 issue as being the second most-successful arcade game of the month. The Neo Geo AES version sold 108,883 cartridges in its first week of release in Japan, at a price of £160–200 ($250–320 at the time, or $530–680 adjusted for inflation) per cartridge. The Neo Geo CD version also sold 142,825 copies in its first week on the market. They sold a combined 310,061 units in Japan.

During its release week, the Sega Saturn port of the game sold 135,214 copies in Japan. As of 2004, the game sold 257,294 copies. The game also sold 145,389 units for the PlayStation in Japan, adding up to a combined total of 712,743 units sold in Japan.

=== Legacy ===
A variety of licensed media based on the game was released in Japan in 1994 and 1995: including two original soundtracks by Pony Canyon, four guidebooks by Keibusha and one by Aspect and multiple manga sidestories by Shinseisha. Kyo's final fight against Saisyu and Rugal is also shown in Masato Matsumoto's manga.

Game designer Masahiro Sakurai regarded the game as one of his favorite competitive experiences. However, after realizing he had been defeating rookies, Sakurai decided that fighting games should also be accessible to newcomers. 1UP.com praised the introduction of Omega Rugal, noting him to be "one of the most stylish boss designs in fighting history", although players could hate him due to how difficult it is to defeat him. The game was followed by The King of Fighters '96 in the next year which further explored the Orochi arc.
