= Susumu Akagi =

Japanese voice actor

- 赤城進
- Born: November 28, 1972 (age 53); Tokyo, Japan
- Occupation: Voice actor
- Years active: 2000–present
- Agent: Kenyu Office

Susumu Akagi (赤城 進, Akagi Susumu) is a Japanese voice actor, specialising in supportive anime roles.

== Filmography ==
=== Television animation ===
- Ikkitousen series (2003) – (Moutoku Sousou)
- Tokko (2006) – (Takeru Inukai)
- Nodame Cantabile (2007) – Hans
- Spice and Wolf II (2009) – (Gi Batos)
- Kingdom (2012) – (En)
- Yona of the Dawn (2014) – (Emperor Il)
- Gate (2015) – (Cicero La Moltose)
- Twin Star Exorcists (2016) – (Otomi)
- Kono Oto Tomare! Sounds of Life (2019) – Kai Asahina, Takagi
- One Piece (2020) – (Babanuki)

=== Films ===
- The Saga of Tanya the Evil (2019) – (Andrew)

=== Original net animation ===
- The King of Fighters: Destiny (2017) – (Goenitz)

=== Video games ===
- The King of Fighters All Star (2018) – (Goenitz)
- Granblue Fantasy (2018) – (Uncle Dan)
- Black Clover: Quartet Knights (2018) – (Freese the Seer)
- Pokémon Masters (2019) – (Additional voices)
- Famicom Detective Club: The Girl Who Stands Behind (2021) – Veteran Teacher
- The King of Fighters XV (2023) – (Goenitz)

=== Dubbing ===
==== Live-action ====
- Sympathy for Mr. Vengeance (2005) – (Mentally Disabled Person) (Ryoo Seung-bum)
- Horsemen (2009) – (Stingray) (Clifton Collins Jr.)
- Lavalantula (2015) – (Marty) (Michael Winslow)
- The Finest Hours (2016) – (Wallace Quirey) (John Ortiz)
- Bohemian Rhapsody (2019) – (Jim Beach) (Tom Hollander)
- The Twilight Zone (2020) – (Agent Allendale) (James Frain)

==== Animation ====
- Teen Titans (2005) – (Robotman)
- Link Click (2021) – Emma's Father
