= Takuma Sakazaki =

SNK video game character

- Art of Fighting and The King of Fighters character
- Takuma Sakazaki by Eisuke Ogura
- First game: Art of Fighting (1992)
- Voiced by: Eiji Tsuda; Hōchū Ōtsuka (Dengeki Bunko drama CD)

In-universe information
- Fighting style: Kyokugenryu Karate
- Family: Ryo Sakazaki (son); Lonette Sakazaki (wife); Yuri Sakazaki (daughter)
- Origin: Japan
- Nationality: Japanese

Takuma Sakazaki (Japanese: タクマ・サカザキ, Hepburn: Takuma Sakazaki); also written as Sakazaki Takuma (坂崎 拓馬), is a fictional character first introduced in SNK's fighting game Art of Fighting. Taking the disguise of the criminal Mr. Karate (Mr.カラテ, Misutā Karate), Takuma is Ryo Sakazaki and Yuri Sakazaki's father and the master and creator of Kyokugenryu Karate (Japanese: 極限流空手), he has taught both Ryo and fellow mate Robert Garcia at a young age. Takuma appears as the final boss of the game. It is later revealed that Takuma was forced to work for crime lord Geese Howard. In Art of Fighting 2, Takuma rebels against Geese and Mr. Big by fighting in their King of Fighters tournament, but retreats due to injuries sustained. Takuma has appeared in The King of Fighters series and SNK vs. Capcom: SVC Chaos.

Takuma is based on Mas Oyama. In Art of Fighting 2, he fights shirtless but was redesigned in The King of Fighters '94 to distinguish him from Goro Daimon. His character would be revised with most SNK games, most notably in SNK vs. Capcom: SVC Chaos where he once again poses as one of the strongest bosses representing the company. The character would become a legacy for Ryo and Robert who also take the nickname of Mr. Karate in other games where they are already middle aged men.

Critical response to Takuma was mixed based on his similarities with the Street Fighter characters as well as his portrayal as both a menacing figure and a comic relief who appears joking with his family and students. His influence in Ryo and Robert was also praised for his two students honoring him in spin-off titles by taking the title of Mr. Karate and creating new techniques in the process.

== Creation ==
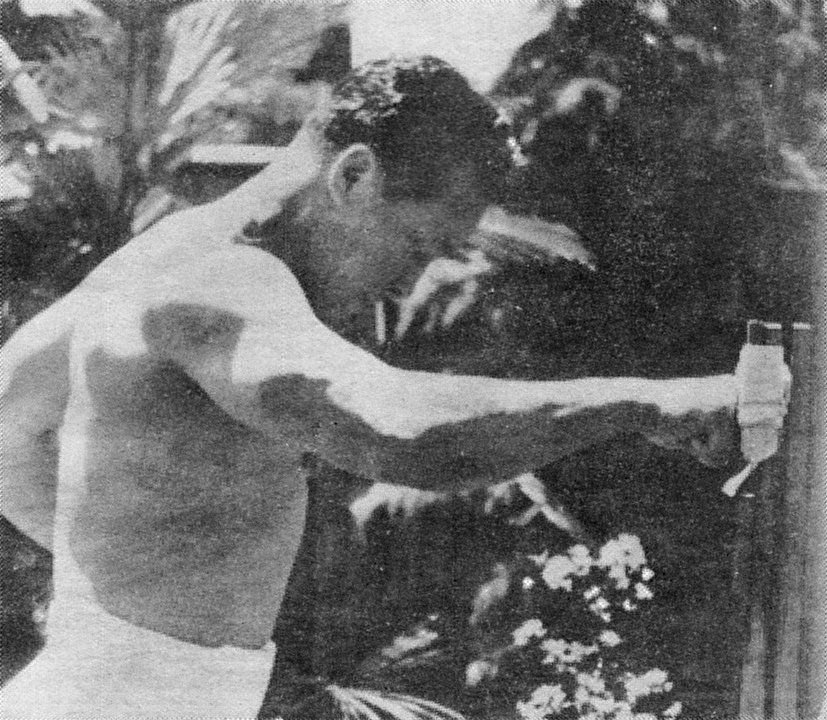
Mas Oyama in 1954

Takuma Sakazaki is loosely based on Mas Oyama. Takuma is voiced by Eiji Tsuda who describes him as a stubborn old man. He was also given the voice of a nice father figure. In Art of Fighting 2, Takuma fights shirtless, but he was redesigned for The King of Fighters '94 to avoid making him too similar to fellow character Goro Daimon. As a result, Takuma wears a white karate gi that covers most of his body. Developers had regrets when designing him in The King of Fighters because one of his moves often resulted in bugs. His design is meant to symbolize his devotion towards his martial arts. For The King of Fighters '98, Takuma, and fellow team members Heidern and Saisyu Kusanagi act in a more comical fashion as a result of their team.

The developers for The King of Fighters XIII changed appearance to further differentiate his reach from Ryo and Robert. While his animations were heavily altered, SNK wanted him to remain unique gameplay wise. His Desperation moves were influenced by SNK vs. Capcom: SVC Chaos where he stands out as a strong boss. There was a piece of lore from Art of Fighting 2 stating that he stopped using the "Built Upper" because the scar on his chest reopened. So, for this KOF title, the designer created a backstory where he pushes himself to use a true "Built Upper" in order to pass the technique on to Ryo. SNK struggled to differentiate the playstyles of Ryo, Robert, and Takuma—all practitioners of Kyokugenryu Karate. Takuma, in particular, has short reach; initially, his flaws stood out more than his strengths, so they went through a lot of trial and error figuring out how to make him fun to play.

Following Takuma's appearances, an older Ryo Sakazaki would be redesigned to look like Takuma, to the point of earning the nickname "Mr. Karate" and wear a tengu mask, which is reminiscent of his father Takuma. In Neo Geo Battle Coliseum, Ryo was given his father's nickname to evoke his power. In regards to the masked Mr. Karate from the spin-off Maximum Impact 2, writer Akihiko Ureshino decided to give him the age of 49, matching his father's. For Fatal Fury: City of the Wolves, Director Hayato Konya wanted to add more crossover elements between Fatal Fury and Art of Fighting. Konya believed the original Mr. Karate was one of the most famous icons in SNK history, even more than Terry Bogard and thus considered adding it to provide further depth to the story, though this time is Robert the one who takes such role.

== Appearances ==
Takuma's Mr. Karate persona

In Art of Fighting, Takuma appears as the final boss Ryo Sakazaki and Robert Garcia must face to rescue their missing friend, Yuri Sakazaki. Mr. Big had Yuri kidnapped. When Robert got to Mr. Big and defeated him, Big called for Mr. Karate. Yuri stops Ryo from killing their father, and they had a joyous reunion. In Art of Fighting 2, Takuma abandons his Mr. Karate persona and joins "The King of Fighters" tournament to fight the mastermind Geese Howard to take revenge. In his ending, Takuma's body reaches his limits, telling Ryo and Yuri to take after him.

Takuma continues fighting alongside his students in The King of Fighters tournaments since The King of Fighters '94, starting in the Mexico Team which is renamed Team Art of Fighting in later games. In The King of Fighters XIII, Mr. Karate can be downloaded. While Takuma is determined to promote his fighting style, in The King of Fighters XIV, he decides to start another shop.

In SNK vs. Capcom: SVC Chaos there is a boss character, Serious Mr. Karate (本気になったMr.カラテ, Honki ni Natta Misutā Karate; lit. "now serious Mr. Karate"). He plays similarly to Mr. Karate, but is faster and more powerful. A middleaged Ryo Sakazaki assumes the nickname Mr. Karate in Fatal Fury: Wild Ambition, Neo Geo Battle Coliseum and KOF: Maximum Impact 2. In Fatal Fury: City of the Wolves, Robert also takes the title of Mr. Karate with Rando Ayamine writing a one-shot manga where Takuma guides Robert to take his name to paritcipate in another tournament.

== Reception ==
Takuma's character has drawn comparison to other characters. In "Os reis da luta: representações do karate nos jogos digitais", Tiago Oviedo Frosi from the Federal University of Rio Grande do Sul wrote that Gichin Funakoshi's "Shōtōkan" is the most practiced style of Karate in the world, this was the style chosen to characterize most of the Street Fighter characters. The Kyokugenryu Ryo uses in Art of Fighting instead comes across as a fantasy version of the "knockout" Kyokushinkaikan created by Mas Oyama who serves as an influence for both Ryu's and Takuma's characters. The writer noted that the character Ryo was a creation of SNK to openly oppose the Street Fighter series and Ryu. Ryo's style is noted to be influenced by Gōgen Yamaguchi which contrasts Ryu's Mas Oyama when they are put in crossover games. Tiago Oviedo Frosi said the handling of Mr. Karate's ego by Ryo and Takuma is noted to be influenced by the religion Shintoism, which inspired the mask of the Tengu creature that Takuma and Ryo often wear. The similarities between SNK's and Capcom's characters led the latter to parody Takuma by making Dan Hibiki's father a man nearly identical to Mr. Karate: Go Hibiki. Comic apparances of Go Hibiki would instead draw him unmasked but a nose notoriously similar to the Tengu. Atomix said that while Takuma represents Mexico in The King of Fighters '94, he shows no such connection to the country in terms of design and other elements.

There was also commentary about Takuma's alterego and development across SNK's games. Den of Geek said the original Mr. Karate from Art of Fighting comes across as a menacing figure Ryo and Robert face at the end of the game even if the tengu mask can come across ridiculous. While Takuma discarded his Mr. Karate persona in following games, the writer said he became a comic relief due to spending calm cutscenes with his family. However, when SNK created the crossover game SNK vs. Capcom: Chaos, Takuma once again took the Mr. Karate persona, becoming a more serious figure comparable to Street Fighter's famous boss character Akuma. GameRant expressed similar feelings about Takuma's development as he comes across as comic relief unmasked and is often replaced by his relatives or allies in The King of Fighters until he was given back his masked alterego for The King of Fighters XIII as downloadble content as well as SNK vs. Cacom: Chaos. The impact of Mr. Karate can be seen in Takuma's son as Ryo often takes the same persona in some SNK IPs due to Takuma's retirement besides wearing similar clothing as well as the mask. ScreenRant said that despite his simple appearance, Takuma might be one of the most powerful character in SNK lore based on his performance as Mr. Karate with The King of Fighters 2000 giving him a cutscene where he counterattacks the Zero Cannon with his own special move.

Early previews to Mr. Karate in Fatal Fury: City of the Wolves confused the audience. According to Diario de Mexico, people expected that Mr. Karate would be Ryo Sakazaki as he carried such name in Fatal Fury: Wild Ambition and the spin-off KOF: Maximum Impact 2 which generated a major surprise when Robert was revealed to be the one carrying that name instead. In retrospect, the writer called Robert one of SNK's most important characters alongside Ryo based on their origins in Art of Fighting and further appearances in other SNK's work for nearly 20 years. Maxime Chao from Jeuxactu was also surprised about Robert being the new Mr. Karate rather than Takuma or Ryo. Since Takuma had originally worn the Tengu mask during his criminal era, Chao wondered what kind of business did SNK put Robert into to make him wear the mask and also take the nickname. Fernando Salinas from LevelUP said Robert stands out despite being Mr. Karate thanks to his stylish business clothes in contrast to the karate gi Ryo and Takuma used to wear. He found Robert as a stronger version of the Mr. Karate from The King of Fighters XIII based on his gameplay features. As a result, Salinas highly praised the persona Robert takes as it makes him worthy of being a Fatal Fury character.
