= Hiroaki Hashimoto =

Japanese illustrator and character designer

Hiroaki Hashimoto, also simply nicknamed Hiroaki (ヒロアキ), is a Japanese illustrator and character designer for SNK and other companies.

== Works ==
Hiroaki studied in Osaka University of Arts. He likes using Painter for illustrations. He was influenced by Kent Williams, Mike Mignola and Buichi Terasawa. His two favorite manga are Fist of the North Star and Kinnikuman, and confessed he was emotioned when reading Takehiko Inoue's Slam Dunk. This eventually lead him to read Inoue's next work, Vagabond. When it comes to music, his favorite band was SMAP and the singer Gackt. He also enjoys the Star Wars films.

He joined SNK in 1998 and worked in several of their works after being recruited by superiors. His first arcade work was Maximum Force. He did small job in Garou: Mark of the Wolves involving the design of Rock Howard and then moved to become the main illustrator of Fatal Fury: Wild Ambition. He particularly found the character of Terry Bogard to be hard to illustrate. He also gave Ryuji Yamazaki a more devil-like for Wild Ambition. While at SNK, he was part of the development team for Buriki One, as well as the visual work of the King of Fighters series. His first work at KOF was The King of Fighters 2000 where veteran artist Shinkiro asked him to draw the poster. He then became a freelancer and is still active today, working on illustrations in a wide range of genres, not just in the game industry. His fast-paced and stylish touch continues to attract many fans. In 2013, he was appointed "Cultural Tourism Ambassador" for his hometown of Marugame City, Kagawa Prefecture. He considers himself better at drawing cool characters rather than handsome men or good looking women. Kula Diamond from The King of Fighters was one of the hardest ones for him.

He is particularly attached to Buriki One. Ryo Sakazaki's redesign in his older persona was created by Hiroaki as he disliked the original orange gi and wanted to mix it more with black colors. Buriki One was the only title he was involved in from the early stages of development to release while at SNK, and participated in a wide range of aspects, from design to motion capture actors. As a first-year employee, he had much fun every day. At that time, a senior colleague told him to draw with speed to fit at SNK. He took it seriously and completed one poster illustration per day. Although Hiraoki was later told it was a joke, he still expressed satisfaction with his work. In The King of Fighters he is particularly attached to K'. He wanted Gai from Buriki One in The King of Fighters.

Outside SNK, Hiroaki also worked as illustrator for Capcom's beat-em up game God Hand, Advance Wars: Days of Ruin and Spikeout: Battle Street. His latest work involves characters from Namco's Soulcalibur VI and Tekken 8 such as Heihachi Mishima.

Outside video games, Hiroaki provided illustrations for Akihiko Ureshino's light novel The King of Fighters 2001: The Gods Themselves.
