= Rugal Bernstein =

Fictional character

- The King of Fighters character
- Rugal as seen in the King of Fighters All Star
- First game: The King of Fighters '94 (1994)
- Created by: Masanori Kuwasashi
- Designed by: Shinichi Morioka; C.A.C. Yamazaki (KOF 98 and KOF 2002)
- Voiced by: Various: Toshimitsu Arai (KOF '94-98, Capcom vs. SNK series, KOF 2002: Unlimited Match, KOF Sky Stage, Neo Geo Heroes: Ultimate Shooting, Metal Slug Defense) Norio Wakamoto (KOF 2002) Banjō Ginga (Dengeki Bunko Drama CD) Tsuguo Mogami (KOF: Destiny onwards)
- Portrayed by: Ray Park

In-universe information
- Fighting style: Hybrid martial arts (mastered numerous martial art styles)
- Origin: Germany
- Nationality: German

Rugal Bernstein (Japanese: ルガール・バーンシュタイン, Hepburn: Rugāru Bānshutain) is a character from The King of Fighters series created by SNK. First introduced in The King of Fighters '94, he is a recurring boss in the series, appearing in some titles as an enhanced version called Omega Rugal (オメガ・ルガール, Omega Rugāru). As the host of the tournaments from The King of Fighters '94 and '95, Rugal plans to turn all the competitors from the tournament into stone statues as part of his collection. Despite his death in '95, Rugal is still featured in certain The King of Fighters titles which do not contain a storyline (nicknamed "Dream Matches"). He has also been featured in the Capcom vs. SNK series as a boss character.

Rugal has also appeared in other media related to The King of Fighters franchise, including comic adaptations and The King of Fighters live-action film, and portrayed by British martial arts actor Ray Park. As the first boss character from The King of Fighters, the SNK staff created him to be one of the most difficult characters to defeat. His Omega Rugal form from '95 has been noted by the staff to be their favorite boss to the point they added him in the Dream Match titles.

Publications for video games and other media have provided praise and criticism for Rugal's character.

== Conception and design ==
Rugal Bernstein was created by SNK game designer Masanori Kuwasashi who named him after a popular anime he enjoyed. During development of The King of Fighters '94, several final boss designs were considered, including a masked dominatrix with a spiked whip, a long haired gentleman in a formal suit, and an early sketch of a muscular man wearing a mask and checkerboard sash around his waist. The concept for making Rugal was to make "the biggest, baddest, most evil villain imaginable," due to the planning team's love of villains, and as his character evolved a planned in-game team consisting of series bosses Geese Howard and Wolfgang Krauser was scrapped to further highlight him. The stage you fight him in was meant to reflect his personality, and at one point they considered it to be a giant mecha modeled after his appearance, before switching to an aircraft carrier. Rugal has been described by developers as "He's the only character who truly represents the ultimate KOF boss" and has become the boss character with the biggest number of appearances in The King of Fighters series, becoming a favorite character among both the developers and series artist Falcoon. The character's popularity has continued even to his appearance in The King of Fighters XV, with artist Tomohiro Nakata surprised by how acclaimed the decision to include Rugal was. Due to his multiple "deaths" in the series, developers jokingly added the hobby "resurrection" to his official profile.

Standing 1.97 m (6 ft 5 in) tall, Rugal is a tall, blonde and athletic man with a thin mustache and his right eye missing. His normal outfit consists of a red formal tailcoat suit with black accents, fingerless gloves, a black cummerbund and ribbon tie, and a white shirt underneath. This outfit has been used for most of his casual appearances, including crossover titles such as Capcom vs. SNK: Millennium Fight 2000 and its sequel. In The King of Fighters '94, when he is defeated the first time he will toss away most of his upper clothes, now wearing a black sleeveless undershirt with his suspenders dangling loose while, and fighting more seriously.

In The King of Fighters '95, though other options were considered Rugal returned as the game's final boss with a modified design. Many ideas were considered for this version, including having him fight shirtless with a tattoo of a leopard covering his left arm and pectoral, a design with armor embedded into his flesh, and another featuring heavy cybernetic implants, with goggles covering his eyes and wires extending from his arms into his chest. A more outlandish design, called "Rugal Infinity", would have featured his body merged with Geese and Krauser, appearing as a six armed naked man with the other two men's faces sticking out of the sides of his head, akin to depictions of the god Ashura. Dubbing him "Omega Rugal", they ultimately settled on an appearance similar to his King of Fighters '94 counterpart, but with his upper body having burst from his clothing, wild white hair, cybernetic prosthetics replacing his right hand and eye, and the Greek letter "Ω" tattooed on his back. Director Masanori Kuwasashi was in charge of the making of this version of the character, aiming to give loose ends with the Orochi demon explored in the series' first story. Omega Rugal later returned in King of Fighters '98, his design changed with the developers focusing on using his secondary 'serious' appearance in '94 as a base, while retaining the cybernetic red eye. This served as Omega Rugal's look from that game onwards with minimal modifications and additions, such as a costume variant adding a red longcoat and armored shoulderpads in XV as an unlockable reward for defeating him as a boss.

== Appearances ==
=== In video games ===
Rugal was introduced in the 1994 game The King of Fighters '94, as a megalomaniac arms dealer inviting fighters from all over the world to fight in his martial arts tournament, seeking worthy opponents and turning those he defeats into stone statues for his throne room. Protagonist Kyo Kusanagi and his teammates make it to the finals, where he finds his father Saisyu has already fought against Rugal and suffered a mortal blow. Angered, Kyo defeats him, but Rugal activates a self destruct sequence in an attempt to kill him. In The King of Fighters '95, Rugal organizes a new King of Fighters tournament to take revenge on Kyo. To this end, Rugal revives and brainwashes Kyo's father to kill him. After Saisyu is knocked unconscious, Rugal fights them in an enhanced form named Omega Rugal. Once defeated, his body is unable to handle the stress, and as his body disintegrates declares he will return. Omega Rugal later returns in "dream match" King of Fighters titles, non-canon entries in the series, serving as the final boss for both The King of Fighters '98 and The King of Fighters 2002, and appearing as an optional boss in their subsequent remakes. In The King of Fighters 2000, Rugal appears as a non-playable assistant character (dubbed a "striker") to Kula Diamond. After the events of The King of Fighters XIV, Rugal is revived and returns as a playable character and optional boss in downloadable content for King of Fighters XV.

In other fighting games, Rugal appears as the final boss of King of Fighters R-2 for the NeoGeo Pocket Color, a chibi parody of King of Fighters '98 in which he is creating clones of other fighters, and upon defeat self-destructs his aircraft carrier with a cartoon bomb. He also appeared in VersusTCG, a physical trading card game based on the first game. In mobile games, he appears as a boss in a King of Fighters themed event for Puzzle & Dragons.

In crossover titles, Rugal appears in both Capcom vs. SNK titles, and as an optional boss fight. In it, a cutscene shows Rugal and Street Fighter character Akuma fighting, with the former defeating the latter and absorbing his essence before casting him aside. This version of Rugal, dubbed "God Rugal" ("Ultimate Rugal" in western releases), appears in a disheveled version of his suit with darkened skin, both his eyes and right hand glowing a bright red, and gains access to several of Akuma's attacks. When defeated, Rugal tries to continue to fight but the stolen essence overtakes him much to his shock, transforming him into a being resembling Akuma before vanishing. He appears on cards for the SNK vs. Capcom: Card Fighters series.

=== Gameplay ===
When designing his gameplay, flagship director Toyohisa Tanabe stated that his fighting style was created to emphasize Rugal's strength as the series' first boss character. He also comments "going a bit overboard" with his Genocide Cutter technique damage ratio in The King of Fighters '94. His Dead-End Screamer special move was originally a technique in which Rugal breaks the neck of his opponent and crushes it. However, it was seen as lacking drama, so it evolved into a move in which he breaks his victim's neck, crushes the victim, and then further spins the victim around to do more damage, striking a pose at the end of the move.

In addition an idea was planned for him to be able to instantly learn and utilize any attack used against him. However this feature was abandoned due to memory restraints, and his use of Kaiser Wave and Reppuken, moves belonging to Krauser and Geese respectively, is a remnant of this concept. His The King of Fighters '98 move set was noted to be strongest of all his appearances, and was carried forward to XV with his playable version having slightly different moves to balance the character.

=== In other media ===
Aside from the main series, Rugal has also appeared in other media from the King of Fighters series. Rugal appears in the first chapter from the spin-off manga The King of Fighters: Kyo, showing his fight against Kyo Kusanagi from King of Fighters '95. He is also Goentiz's target in the prequel Goenitz Gaiden: The King of Fighters '96 Millennium Zero. In 1995, the character was voiced by Banjō Ginga in the Dengeki Bunko-produced CD drama The King of Fighters - King of Fighters '94, a retelling of the story from the video games. In the manhua The King of Fighters Zillion, Rugal is remade by the organization NESTS and faces the rebellious K'. Rugal also appears as the main villain behind in the Chinese computer animated series The King of Fighters: Destiny where he where he faces several of the participants with the power of Orochi. However, Rugal is defeated by Kyo Kusanagi and his body is collected by the Orochi servant Goenitz. The character was meant to return in the film The King of Fighters: Awaken facing Kyo but was cancelled.

In the 2010 live-action film adaptation of The King of Fighters, Rugal is played by veteran actor Ray Park.

== Reception and cultural impact ==
Rugal has been widely praised for not only his high difficulty as a boss, but also his personality and character portrayal

Rugal's high difficulty in King of Fighters '94, notably during his second phase, led to fighting game fans coining the term "SNK Boss syndrome", in reference to when a computer-controlled opponent in a fighting game is extremely difficult to play against to the point of feeling "outright broken". Retro Gamer cited that his attacks copied from other fighters gave him a "formidable foundation", and that his own suite of attacks coupled with his lore of killing defeated opponents by turning them into statues them made him "the ultimate boss". Darren Bonthuys of GameSpot called him "the boss of bosses", stating that he played like a culmination of every previous boss in other SNK fighting games, "but better". 1UP.com described his Omega Rugal design as "one of the most stylish boss designs in fighting history, although more than a few gamers grew to hate the sight of him," and praised his absence in King of Fighters '96. However, the magazine RetroManiac called him "one of the most charismatic bosses in the saga", and praised his inclusion in even handheld versions of King of Fighters.

Gavin Jasper of Den of Geek praised Rugal's character as a villain, comparing him to Capcom's Street Fighter antagonists with "He’s what M. Bison wishes he could be," and "he proves that as great as Akuma is, his power is better wielded by a megalomaniac with the gift of style and swagger." Going into more detail with the latter, he added that while other crossover fighting games such as Marvel vs. Capcom: Infinite would routinely feature a "merged" villain from their respective franchises, Rugal's approach of stealing Akuma's techniques and how he utilized them with his own style set him apart. He further praised Rugal by stating despite all incarnations of the character being incredibly difficult to fight, "the dude has so much swagger and radiates such coolness that I can’t hate him. He’s Rugal Goddamn Bernstein and we’re better for knowing him." Jasper noted that while Rugal returned for "dream match" games in the series, in his eyes solidifying himself as "THE villain of King of Fighters", he felt the character didn't wear out his welcome. Instead he stated Rugal was defined as much by his weakness as his strengths, namely in regards to his deaths in the King of Fighters and Capcom vs. SNK titles due to absorbing too much power, describing it as "classic villainy".

In Mexico where the King of Fighters franchise is extremely popular, Rugal's presence as a playable character has led to his picture being plastered on arcade cabinets with a statement not to select him, specifically stating "Prohibido jugar con Rugal" (lit. "Forbidden to play with Rugal"). A Spanish scholarly paper discussing human nature and the social norms of sportsmanlike conduct also mentioned Rugal in this context, and political figure Jaime Rodríguez Calderón specifically asked people not to use him when suggesting they play The King of Fighters among other video games during a "Game Day" celebration. However Brazilian anthropology researcher Deyse Brandão in a dissertation cited Rugal as an example of a popular nickname amongst young students in her country, in the same vein as "Stark" or "Naruto", with the students applying the character's symbolism towards themselves as a form of identity.
