= The King of Fighters '94 =

1994 video game

- Arcade flyer
- Developer: SNK
- Publisher: SNK
- Director: Masanori Kuwasashi
- Producers: Takashi Nishiyama; Eikichi Kawasaki
- Designers: Toyohisa Tanabe; Haruo Tomita; Yosisi Hashimoto
- Artists: Mitsuo Kodama; Shinkiro
- Composer: Masahiko Hataya
- Series: The King of Fighters
- Platforms: Arcade, Neo Geo AES, Neo Geo CD
- Release: August 25, 1994: Arcade; JP/NA: August 25, 1994 Neo Geo AES; JP/NA: October 1, 1994 Neo Geo CD; JP/NA: November 2, 1994 Re-Bout PlayStation 2; JP: December 28, 2004
- Genre: Fighting
- Modes: Single-player, multiplayer
- Arcade system: Neo Geo MVS

The King of Fighters '94 (KOF '94) is a 1994 crossover fighting game developed and published by SNK for the Neo Geo arcade and home systems. It was released for the Neo Geo MVS arcade system, and the Neo Geo AES and CD home consoles. It is the first installment in The King of Fighters series. It features characters from SNK's previous fighting game properties, such as Fatal Fury and Art of Fighting, alongside updated versions of characters from Ikari Warriors and Psycho Soldier, and several new, original characters. The story centers on The King of Fighters tournament organized by the wealthy criminal Rugal Bernstein.

SNK designer Takashi Nishiyama appointed Masanori Kuwasashi as the game's director after admiring his work at Irem. Kuwasashi's first project at SNK was Baseball Stars Professional, where he met Toyohisa Tanabe, who would later become the series' battle designer. Together, they aimed to create an all-star fighting game combining established SNK characters with new ones. This led to the creation of the Japan Team, led by the new protagonist Kyo Kusanagi, a high school delinquent and martial artist who wields pyrokinetic powers.

KOF '94 was developed with the concept of bringing together characters from SNK's various properties to attract their respective fanbases. The game's character designs and innovative Team Battle System—where players compete using three-member teams instead of individual fighters—were widely praised by critics and players. The game's success prompted SNK to launch The King of Fighters series, beginning with KOF '95, which eventually became the company's flagship franchise.

In 2004, to celebrate the tenth anniversary of the series, SNK released a remake titled The King of Fighters '94 Re-Bout for the PlayStation 2, featuring higher-resolution graphics and 3D environments. KOF '94 has also been included in the SNK Arcade Classics Vol. 1 compilation for the PlayStation 2, PlayStation Portable, and Wii, and is available individually for digital distribution on modern platforms. An Xbox version of KOF '94 Re-Bout was advertised on the back of the Samurai Shodown V manual, as an "Only on Xbox" title, but never released.

== Gameplay ==
Screenshot of a fight between Kyo Kusanagi and Sie Kensou

The basic gameplay system of KOF '94 is similar to SNK's previous games, such as the Fatal Fury series, Art of Fighting, and Samurai Shodown. The game uses a four-attack button configuration similar to Fatal Fury 2 and Fatal Fury Special, consisting of a light punch, light kick, strong punch, and strong kick. Like in Fatal Fury 2, specialized techniques are performed by pressing combinations of buttons, allowing the player to dodge an opponent's attack or launch a powerful knockdown attack. As with most fighting games, each character has a set of basic, unique, and special moves that can be performed by the player with a specific series of joystick and button inputs.

Each player has a power gauge at the bottom of the screen, which charges when the character blocks or takes damage. It can also be charged manually by pressing and holding three buttons simultaneously; however, this manual charge leaves the character vulnerable to an attack. Once the power gauge is filled, the player's basic attacks become stronger for a short period. In this state, players can perform their character's Super Move, which immediately consumes the entire power gauge. Players can also access their character's Super Move when their life gauge is 75% empty and flashing red, similar to Fatal Fury 2. Taunting an opponent can reduce their power gauge, slow down their manual charging, and prevent them from reaching the maximum level.

KOF '94 replaced the traditional round-based format used in preceding fighting games with a format consisting of 3-on-3 team-based matches, dubbed the Team Battle System. Instead of choosing a single character, the player selects from one of eight available teams, each consisting of three members. Before each match, the player chooses the order in which their team members will enter the battle. When the match begins, the members chosen to go first on their respective teams fight. When one character is defeated, the following member of the same team takes their place, while the character on the winning team has a small portion of their life restored (if energy was lost during the previous round). If a character is losing a match, the player can call one of their remaining teammates standing on the sidelines to jump in and perform a support attack. The match ends when all three members of either team lose.

== Plot ==
Rugal Bernstein is a notorious, ruthless, and highly influential black-market arms and drug dealer who has grown bored by a lack of competition. To entertain himself, he decides to host a new King of Fighters (K.O.F.) tournament. Rugal sends out 24 invitations to fighters around the world. Unlike the previous three K.O.F. tournaments depicted in Art of Fighting 2, Fatal Fury: King of Fighters, and Fatal Fury 2, the new tournament is a team-based competition featuring eight teams of three, with each team representing a different nationality.

At the tournament's conclusion, Mature, Rugal's personal secretary, invites the winning Japan team to fight their final match aboard his aircraft carrier, the Black Noah. Rugal reveals the true purpose of his tournament: to defeat the winning team and add them to his grisly collection of previous challengers, who have been preserved as statues. After Kyo Kusanagi sees his dying father Saisyu in Black Noah, he decides to avenge him. When Rugal is finally beaten, he triggers the ship's self-destruct mechanism. The team escapes and reflects on their victory with Kyo deciding to train for the next tournament.

== Characters ==
The game features 24 playable characters divided into eight teams of three fighters. The final boss is not part of any team, is unplayable, and fights the player's team alone. Five teams consist of characters from other SNK franchises, while the rest consist mostly of KOF originals. Each team represents a different country, though this primarily affects the stage on which the team is fought, as the characters often do not share the nationality of the country they represent. Unlike later games in the series, the player cannot freely build a custom team and must choose one of the eight preset teams. The teams include:

- Team Japan (Hero Team):
  - Kyo Kusanagi, a high-school student whose family possesses an ancient set of pyrokinetic abilities. He fights using Kenpo.
  - Benimaru Nikaido, a model who fights with shootboxing and possesses electrokinetic abilities.
  - Goro Daimon, a large judo practitioner with geokinetic abilities.
- Team Fatal Fury:
  - Terry Bogard, the protagonist of the Fatal Fury series, who has been trained in various fighting styles such as karate, kickboxing, and kung fu. He attacks with ki-based techniques learned from his master, Tung Fu Rue.
  - Andy Bogard, Terry's brother, who is trained in Koppojutsu and Shiranui-Ryu Ninjutsu. He also utilizes ki-based techniques.
  - Joe Higashi, a Muay Thai fighter with aerokinetic abilities.
- Team Art of Fighting:
  - Ryo Sakazaki, protagonist of the Art of Fighting series and first champion of the K.O.F. tournament. He practices Kyokugenryu karate—a style similar to Kyokushin karate but incorporating ki-based techniques.
  - Robert Garcia, Ryo's best friend and friendly rival, who fights using a kick-heavy variation of Kyokugenryu karate.
  - Takuma Sakazaki, Ryo's father and a master of Kyokugenryu karate, who is the only one capable of performing the style's most advanced techniques.
- Team Women Fighters:
  - Mai Shiranui, a ninja who practices her family's martial art, Shiranui-Ryu ninjutsu.
  - Yuri Sakazaki, Ryo's younger sister, who fights with an unorthodox take on Kyokugenryu karate.
  - King, a bar owner who fights with her own kick-heavy variation of Muay Thai. She can also execute ki-based projectile attacks with her kicks.
- Team Ikari Warriors:
  - Ralf Jones, protagonist of the Ikari Warriors series. A mercenary whose fighting style relies heavily on powerful punches.
  - Clark Steel, Ralf's best friend and the other protagonist of the Ikari Warriors series. He utilizes a wrestling-based fighting style.
  - Heidern, the commander of the Ikari Warriors mercenary unit, whose hands can cut like knives and who can throw slashes as projectiles.
- Team Korea Justice:
  - Kim Kaphwan, a taekwondo master with a strong sense of justice who is attempting to rehabilitate the two criminals on his team.
  - Chang Koehan, a massive criminal who fights with a large metal ball attached to a chain.
  - Choi Bounge, a diminutive criminal who fights with bladed gloves.
- Team Psycho Soldier:
  - Athena Asamiya, the protagonist of Psycho Soldier and a Japanese idol with psychokinetic abilities and kung fu training. Her fighting style emphasizes her psychic powers.
  - Sie Kensou, who harbors an unrequited crush on Athena. He possesses similar psychokinetic abilities, but his fighting style emphasizes his kung fu training.
  - Chin Gentsai, the master of Athena and Sie, and a master of various kung fu styles who fights primarily with drunken boxing.
- Team American Sports:
  - Heavy D!, a professional boxer who was banned from regular competition after severely injuring an opponent.
  - Lucky Glauber, a former professional basketball player and karate champion with a penchant for street fighting.
  - Brian Battler, an American football player who utilizes wrestling techniques in combat.
- Final Boss:
  - Rugal Bernstein, an arms dealer and the organizer of The King of Fighters tournament. He is capable of copying any technique after seeing it performed once, making heavy use of Geese Howard's Reppuken and Wolfgang Krauser's Kaiser Wave ki-attacks. He also has his own unique techniques, such as a slashing kick called the Genocide Cutter.

== Development ==
Concept of Survivor featuring North American Sports Team (top) and its transition into a fighting game.

After seeing Masanori Kuwasashi's work at Irem, SNK game designer Takashi Nishiyama appointed him as the director of The King of Fighters '94. Kuwasashi's first project at SNK was Baseball Stars Professional, where he met Toyohisa Tanabe, who would go on to become the series' battle designer. According to interviews with veteran designers of The King of Fighters series, the prototype version of the game was a Double Dragon-style side-scrolling beat 'em up titled Survivor. It was intended to use only core characters from the Art of Fighting and Fatal Fury series, allowing players to control Robert Garcia and Terry Bogard during location testing. The idea was eventually abandoned. However, because SNK was attached to the concept of a crossover between the two series, the staff agreed to pivot the project into an all-star fighting game. Classic characters from Ikari Warriors and Psycho Soldier were subsequently added to the roster. The concept of a three-man team was one of the few ideas retained from the side-scrolling prototype. The title "The King of Fighters" was reused from the subtitle of the first Fatal Fury game, Fatal Fury: King of Fighters.

Series director Toyohisa Tanabe stated that the Art of Fighting and Fatal Fury characters were included specifically to appeal to adult players, while the newer KOF characters were designed to appeal to younger audiences. Characters such as Benimaru Nikaido and Chang Koehan were added to bring an offbeat variety to the roster, which Tanabe had previously felt was too serious. The team aimed to compete with Capcom's Street Fighter series by introducing a team-based system as a direct response to the single-fighter format of Capcom's games. This led to the decision to include 24 playable characters, even though the roster was considered unusually large by fighting game standards at the time. SNK artist C.A.C. Yamasaki noted that while the lead programmer doubted the game's commercial viability, Yamasaki believed it would eventually become popular. Only ten people attended the first location test, but turnout grew significantly during subsequent tests. SNK also struggled to advertise the game effectively due to a limited marketing budget and reportedly low-quality promotional materials.

Kuwasashi expressed early concerns about introducing a young lead character who might clash with the established veteran fighters, but ultimately believed it would benefit sales. After several discussions, the staff finalized the creation of the new hero, Kyo Kusanagi. They focused on designing him to be a more realistic and relatable character than those seen in other fighting games, emphasizing his youth, personal relationships, and stylish clothing. The designers wanted a "snazzy" lead who could hold his own against popular characters from Fatal Fury and Art of Fighting. Voice actor Masahiro Nonaka drew inspiration from the late musician Yutaka Ozaki when recording Kyo's dialogue, giving the character a distinct and appealing personality despite initial reservations. Fellow Team Japan member Benimaru Nikaido was designed to contrast visually with muscular fighting game staples like Liu Kang from Mortal Kombat and Sagat from Street Fighter by sporting a slender, model-like appearance. The boss character, Rugal Bernstein, was developed with the explicit goal of creating "the mightiest (most violent) and most evil boss character ever". Initially, the developers planned a "Fugitive Team" consisting of Chang, Choi, and an unknown criminal, but Kim Kaphwan was ultimately added to lead them instead. The English Team originally consisted of King from Art of Fighting alongside Billy Kane and Big Bear from the Fatal Fury series. However, memory capacity issues regarding Big Bear, combined with pressure from the Art of Fighting development staff to include Yuri Sakazaki, led to changes. Yuri ultimately replaced Billy Kane, and Mai Shiranui took Big Bear's spot, forming the English Team (which was renamed the Women Fighters Team in subsequent games).

Initially, the developers planned to alter or remove moves from established characters to balance them against the new fighters. Ultimately, however, they chose to focus on balancing the gameplay without sacrificing any of the characters' signature techniques. Series creators have noted that the Art of Fighting characters ended up being some of the strongest in the game. Nevertheless, characters like Terry and Andy Bogard received significant attention from the designers and were given entirely new moves. The development team also took a careful approach to designing the background stages; the Japanese stage, for example, was modeled after the developers' own office environment. Tanabe and his team balanced the large cast through extensive trial-and-error, though they intentionally designed Heidern to be one of the most overpowered characters. While the team enjoyed significant creative freedom with the Neo Geo hardware, maintaining that quality when porting the game to other platforms proved difficult. The PlayStation and Sega Saturn ports were commercially successful, but drew criticism for their bland stages and compromised character animations. Despite these technical hurdles, Kuwasashi and his staff were surprised by the game's overall popularity, which was cemented when KOF '94 won a major fighting game award from Gamest magazine.

== Release ==
The King of Fighters '94 was released in Japanese and North American arcades on August 25, 1994. Home versions of the game were released later that year for the Neo Geo AES on October 1 and the Neo Geo CD on November 2. The home version was censored outside Japan; Mai's breast physics and blood effects were removed (though the blood could be disabled by arcade operators as well).

On November 6, 2007, an emulation of the Neo Geo AES version was released for the Wii Virtual Console in Japan for 900 Wii Points. The North American and European releases followed on November 23, 2007, and January 7, 2008, respectively. An emulated version of the game is also included in the compilations SNK Arcade Classics Vol. 1 and The King of Fighters Collection: The Orochi Saga, both released for the PlayStation 2, PlayStation Portable, and Wii. The game was re-released for the PlayStation 3 and PlayStation Portable on December 21, 2010, as one of the first titles in the NEOGEO Station line-up. In 2012, KOF '94 was announced as one of twenty pre-loaded games for SNK Playmore's Neo Geo X handheld console, but it was ultimately replaced by The King of Fighters '95. Hamster Corporation released the game as part of the ACA Neo Geo series for the PlayStation 4 on October 27, 2016, with releases for Xbox One, Xbox Series X/S, PlayStation 5, Microsoft Windows, Nintendo Switch, iOS, and Android following shortly after.

== Reception ==
Reception

Aggregate score
Aggregator	Score
GameRankings	79% (Neo Geo)

Review scores
Publication	Score
AllGame	3.5/5 (Neo Geo)
Edge	8/10 (Neo Geo)
Eurogamer	8/10 (Wii)
Famitsu	26/40 (Neo Geo)
IGN	8/10 (Wii)
Next Generation	3/5 (Arcade, Neo Geo)
Official Nintendo Magazine	81% (Wii)

Awards
Publication	Award
Electronic Gaming Monthly (1994)	Best Fighting Game, Best Neo-Geo Game
VideoGames (1994)	Best Neo•Geo Game

=== Critical response ===
The game was well received by critics, who generally praised its deep combat system and the crossover of fighters from different SNK franchises. However, the inability to customize team lineups in Team Battle Mode was a near-universal complaint. Next Generation reiterated their praise in a later review of the Neo Geo version, stating, "Every fighting fan should take a look at this one either in the arcades or in the home."

A reviewer for Next Generation argued that The King of Fighters '94 was a particularly worthwhile arcade game because the three-character teams effectively gave players three lives per credit, providing high value at a time when arcade games were becoming more expensive. Reviewing the Neo Geo home version, GamePro remarked that the character selection was massive but unbalanced, noting that many of the new characters were "goofy looking" and underpowered compared to the veteran fighters. They nonetheless concluded that "The King of Fighters is the very best non-Shodown game available for the Neo Geo, and it's one of the most playable fighting games ever", praising gameplay additions like the dodge maneuver and juggle combos.

In a review of the Virtual Console release, Lucas M. Thomas of IGN praised KOF '94 for its graphics, fluid animation, and vibrant colors, but suggested that players might be better off waiting for its improved sequels to arrive on the platform. According to IGN's Jeremy Dunham, the game "was essentially a cross between Fatal Fury and Art of Fighting," featuring faster control responses. He noted that the three-on-three format was an advanced feature for 1994, and the idea of "borrowing" characters from the company's other properties was highly innovative. Reviewing the Virtual Console release, Dan Whitehead of Eurogamer identified the crossover aspect and the Team Battle Mode as the game's most distinctive features. He concluded that it was "a solid, technical fighting game that, like most SNK outings, skews more towards the hardcore player than the casual punching aficionado." According to Kyle Knight of Allgame, the graphics and sound design—while better than most games of the era—were subpar by SNK's standards. He concluded that The King of Fighters '94 is "a very good fighting game, but it lacks some refinements that would have made it great."

=== Popularity ===
In Japan, Game Machine listed The King of Fighters '94 as the second most popular arcade game of September 1994. In North America, RePlay reported it as the third most popular arcade game that same month. Play Meter also listed it as the 32nd most popular arcade game in October 1994. Electronic Gaming Monthly awarded KOF '94 "Best Fighting Game" beating Super Street Fighter II Turbo, Darkstalkers: The Night Warriors, Samurai Shodown II, and Mortal Kombat II. It was also awarded "Best Neo-Geo Game" of 1994, beating Fatal Fury Special, Samurai Shodown II, World Heroes 2 Jet and Super Sidekicks 2: The World Championship; additionally, Mai Shiranui was named "Hottest Game Babe" of the year. In Japan, the game was named "Best Game of 1994" at the Eighth Annual Grand Prize awards held by the arcade magazine Gamest. It also placed first in the "Best Competitive Fighting Game" and "Best Direction" categories, fifth in "Best Graphics", and third in "Best VGM". Several characters from the game were featured in the magazine's list of the top 50 characters of 1994, including Athena (#3), Kyo (#4), Yuri (#7), King (#8), and Mai (#10).

The game has been highly praised in retrospective reviews and top lists by various publications. G4 noted that The King of Fighters '94 was regarded by some fans as a "Street Fighter beater" and was completely unique due to its team system. Maximum similarly called it "the first beat-em-up to offer more than the Street Fighter series," adding that it "helped spearhead the SNK renaissance". 1UP.com lauded its large and well-balanced roster, calling it "a hell of a cast in 1994". In 2010, UGO.com listed it among the Top 25 Fighting Games of All Time, and GamePlayBook ranked it as the seventh-best 2D fighting game ever made. Complex writers ranked it as the eighth-best fighting game of all time in 2011, and the eleventh-best SNK fighting game in 2012, noting that "the unique team selection and elimination style matches of the series made their origin in this great '90s fighter."

== Remake ==
A remake, titled The King of Fighters '94 Re-Bout, was released exclusively in Japan for the PlayStation 2 on December 28, 2004, commemorating the franchise's tenth anniversary. Re-Bout includes both the original 1994 game and an enhanced version featuring higher-resolution graphics, a Team Edit option (similar to later KOF titles), the ability to play as Saisyu Kusanagi and Rugal Bernstein, rearranged music, new stages, and an online versus mode. Following the game's release, SNK Playmore noted negative fan feedback regarding the simple upscaling and smoothing of character sprites, which prompted the company to create entirely new, high-resolution sprites for subsequent entries in the series. A North American version was planned for the Xbox. It was ultimately canceled in March 2006 for undisclosed reasons.

== Related media ==
The game received a variety of licensed media releases in Japan throughout 1994 and 1995:

- The original soundtrack, The King of Fighters '94 (PCCB-00162), and the arranged soundtrack, The King of Fighters '94 Arrange Sound Trax (PCCB-00165), both released by Pony Canyon.
- The art book The King of Fighters '94 (GMC-2), published as part of the Gamest Mook series by Shinseisha.
- The LaserDisc audio and video release The King of Fighters '94 (PCLP-00539) by Pony Canyon LD.
- Several manga published in the Gamest Comics collection by Shinseisha:
  - A Yonkoma manga by various artists titled The King of Fighters '94 4-Koma Ketteiban (ISBN 4-88199-150-7).
  - A selection of illustrations and short strips by various artists titled The King of Fighters '94 Comic Anthology (ISBN 4-88199-196-5).
  - Ryo Takamisaki's six-volume adaptation series titled The King of Fighters '94 Gaiden (beginning with ISBN 4-88199-168-X).
