= Art of Fighting =

Video game series

- Genre: Fighting
- Developers: SNK; KOF Studio
- Publisher: SNK
- Creator: Hiroshi Matsumoto
- Platforms: Arcade, Neo Geo AES, Neo-Geo CD, SNES, Mega Drive/Genesis, PC Engine CD, PlayStation 2
- First release: Art of Fighting; 24 September 1992
- Latest release: Art of Fighting 3: The Path of the Warrior; 12 March 1996

Art of Fighting, known in Japan as Dragon & Tiger Fist, (Note: Japanese: 龍虎の拳, Hepburn: Ryūko no Ken) is a series of fighting video games created by Japanese game designer Hiroshi Matsumoto. Originally released for the Neo Geo platform in the early 1990s, it is the second fighting game franchise created by SNK, following the Fatal Fury series, and is set in the same fictional universe. The original Art of Fighting was released in 1992, followed by two sequels: Art of Fighting 2 in 1994 and Art of Fighting 3: The Path of the Warrior in 1996. A new Art of Fighting game is currently in development. The trilogy primarily focus on two martial artists known as Ryo Sakazaki and Robert Garcia as they use their Kyokugenryu Karate to face enemies in their quests explored in the trilogy of games. Such skills are obtained across bonus from the first game while they become integrated in the two sequels with new characters becoming playable.

The franchise went to become one of SNK's biggest hits from the early 1990s for its focus on fighting engine and storytelling. This eventually led to connect it to other SNK franchises in the form of crossovers with the Fatal Fury series, with Ryo being playable in two installments among others, which would form as the basis of The King of Fighters series from SNK. Despite its fame, critical response to the first game was mixed as many considered the game inferior to previously released games like Street Fighter II, also resulting in criticism from their similarities. Nevertheless, the improvements each sequel had were the subject of praise. The similarities between Art of Fighting and Street Fighter protagonist resulted into the creation of the latter's parody character Dan Hibiki which eventually led to jokes between the companies.

== Games ==
Release timeline
1992	Art of Fighting
1993
1994	Art of Fighting 2
1995
1996	Art of Fighting 3: The Path of the Warrior
1997–2005
2006	Art of Fighting Anthology

Taking place in 1978, Ryo Sakazaki and Robert Garcia set out to find Ryo's sister, Yuri, who has been kidnapped by Mr. Big. Mr. Big has taken the girl to entice Takuma Sakazaki, Ryo's father and originator of the fictional form of karate known as Kyokugen Karate ("Extreme style"), and because Ryo refused to work for Big. After they defeat Mr. Big, Ryo and Robert face the enigmatic Mr. Karate. Art of Fighting's story ends with a cliff-hanger; Yuri is about to disclose the true identity of Mr. Karate as their father Takuma. Ryo and Robert are the only playable heroes in the single player story mode, although eight of the game's ten fighters are playable by default in the two player versus mode. Mr. Big and Mr. Karate can be played in the Neo Geo MVS (arcade) version by reaching their respective stages in the game then having a second player join in, and in the Neo Geo AES (console) version through the use of cheat codes. A X68000 version of Art of Fighting was in development by Magical Company but it went unreleased for unknown reasons.

Art of Fighting 2 was in arcades on February 3, 1994. It involves both new and returning characters competing against each other in the King of Fighters tournament. The plot features Ryo Sakazaki and his friends as they work together to take down the mafia host Geese Howard, whose forces manipulated them in the first Art of Fighting game. It retains most of the characters from the first Art of Fighting rather than just Ryo and Robert Garcia. The gameplay remains faithful to the original Art of Fighting, including Desperation Moves and taunts that are used strategically. This game was promoted with The King of Fighters '94 released in the same year by the company. It was ported to the Neo Geo AES, Neo Geo CD and Super Famicom. It would be later ported as part of the entire Art of Fighting trilogy for more modern consoles.

Art of Fighting 3: The Path of the Warrior was the first game in the series (and the first SNK fighting game) to use motion capture for its animation, often being noted as some of the best sprite-work SNK has produced. It features a new cast of characters with the exception of Ryo and Robert. Yuri Sakazaki is seen in the game, but only as a side character in Ryo and Robert's story mode. The story switched focus from the Sakazakis to Robert Garcia. Robert disappears to search for an old childhood friend, Freia Lawrence, and he tracks her to Glasshill Valley, Mexico. Freia is wanted by the game's main antagonist, Tom Wyler, to complete a powerful elixir that was created by his and Freia's fathers.

=== Upcoming Art of Fighting game ===
The King of Fighters game designer Toyohisa Tanabe wanted to worked on a new Art of Fighting after playing its third installment with The King of Fighters '96 engine but was not given permission.

At Evo 2024, following similar revivals of the Samurai Shodown and Fatal Fury series, SNK announced they were developing a new entry in the Art of Fighting series, marking the series' first new entry in nearly 30 years.

=== Ports and compilations ===
The original trilogy were all released for the Neo Geo MVS arcade system, Neo Geo AES home console, and Neo Geo CD. Art of Fighting was ported to the PC Engine CD, SNES, and Sega Genesis/Mega Drive, while Art of Fighting 2 was also ported to Super Famicom. Many of these ports made minor changes to the gameplay, story, or graphics.

The Neo Geo trilogy was compiled in Art of Fighting Anthology (龍虎の拳 ～天・地・人～, Ryuuko no Ken Tenchijin) for the PlayStation 2, while the original game was also included as part of SNK Arcade Classics Vol. 1 and the NEOGEO Station service. The trilogy has also been digitally re-released via the Wii Virtual Console and the ACA Neo Geo series. A port of Art of Fighting 3, titled Art of Fighting 3 R, is currently in development and will feature gameplay balance adjustments and two additional characters.

== Gameplay ==
Gameplay screenshot showcasing a match between Ryo Sakazaki and Ryuhaku Todoh

The Art of Fighting series follows the conventions of the time in the sense that the player faces a variety of opponents in best two-out-of-three matches. Each of the game's characters have a unique fighting style and set of special techniques. The player has two basic attacks—punch and kick—as well as a utility button that switches between punches, kicks, and throws. A fourth button is used for taunting. Art of Fighting's contribution to the genre was the inclusion of a "spirit gauge" underneath the character's life bar. When characters perform special techniques, their spirit gauge is depleted and their special attacks become weaker. Players can also drain their opponent's spirit gauge by taunting them.

The Art of Fighting series was also the first fighting series to allow players to perform a "super attack". In the original Art of Fighting, the player's character can learn a super attack (dubbed the super death blow) by completing one of the game's bonus rounds (this technique is available by default in the 3rd game). All three games also feature "Desperation Attacks" that can only be performed when the player's health is low and the life bar is flashing.

The series also introduced graphical scaling into the fighting game genre: as the characters move towards each other, the camera zooms in to maximize the level of detail. Character sprites in Art of Fighting change as the fight progresses to become more bruised and cut as damage is taken.

== Plot ==
The Art of Fighting series serves as a prequel to the Fatal Fury series, with the three games taking place between 1978 and 1980, over a decade before the events of Fatal Fury: King of Fighters. The initial two games are set in South Town, the same setting as the Fatal Fury series, while the third takes place in the fictional Mexican town of Glasshill Valley. Older versions of the game's cast have gone on to appear in later Fatal Fury entries, most prominently Fatal Fury: City of the Wolves.

Many characters from both Art of Fighting and Fatal Fury appear in The King of Fighters series, which is set in its own universe that ignores the continuity established in the Art of Fighting and Fatal Fury games so that the characters from both series could battle without having to age any of them.

== Development ==
Shortly after the release of Street Fighter, a headhunter approached director Takashi Nishiyama and convinced him to leave Capcom and join nearby studio SNK. Nishiyama took planner Hiroshi Matsumoto and the majority of his team with him and abandoned the Street Fighter IP. In SNK, Matsumoto directed the fighting game Art of Fighting starring the leads Ryo Sakazaki and Robert Garcia who fight people in the city of Southtown to rescue the missing Yuri Sakazaki. The cast were created by Matsumoto as an homage to the Capcom fighting games' characters. Matsumoto has stated that he felt he was appealing to people who did not usually play games by showing the story in the game instead of just media such as magazines and comics. Since the game primarily mainly men, the staff had problems deciding on a female fighter. This eventually resulted in the creation of King. However, the final design was more andrdogynous almost llike a man. Meanwhile, the other female character, Yuri, was given a more fragile portrayal despite having the same voice as King.

SNK developer Yasuyuki Oda reflected that both Art of Fighting and the other IP Fatal Fury seemed to appeal to fans of male-oriented series like Fist of the North Star and Dragon Ball. The inclusion of portraying several macho fighters led to dilemma of including more female character with Mai Shiranui standing out as SNK's first female fighter. With Mai's high popularity in Fatal Fury, SNK decided to include Yuri in Art of Fighting 2 as a playable character which received similar response. Development of the game took a year. For the new characters, SNK were unable to connect them to the story, so that meant they had more freedom in designing them. The idea was making clashy and cool designs like Kisaragai, and Temjin. They wanted to rival King of Fighters in that way. Balancing them was the most difficult task. As the first game the staff were trying to pursue an interesting story, which necessarily meant more emphasis on the CPU battles. Art of Fighting 2 was meant to be more of a The King of Fighters-style, "fighting tournament" game. To that end, they intended for the vs. play to be more important this time. They used the names of the moves from the previous game as their basis. If there's a strong move, we try to come up with a fittingly tough-sounding name. Geese Howard's popularity in Fatal Fury and his younger look from the first original video animation influenced his appearance in Art of Fighting 2 as a hidden boss.

Like the first Art of Fighting and the sequel Art of Fighting 2, the third installment was produced by Hiroshi Matsumoto or Takashi Nishiyama. It was the first game in the series (and the first SNK fighting game) to use motion capture for its animation, The concept behind Art of Fighting 3 was to use motion capture, so instead of the company's own Artbox tool that had been used to develop MVS and Neo Geo games, SNK used Microsoft Windows. At the time, SNK did not have the technology for motion capture, so motion capture was recorded in the United States over a period of one to two months. After that, each character's movements were pixelated based on the motion capture. In regards to the third Art of Figthting, the game was noted to be called "Gaiden" (lit. "alternative story") as a result of the story focusing now on Robert rather than Ryo.

== In other media ==
=== Video games ===
Some of the Art of Fighting cast have continued appearing in other SNK fighting games since the last game in the Art of Fighting series was released. In the same way that Geese Howard appears as a secret boss in Art of Fighting 2, Ryo Sakazaki appears as a secret boss in Fatal Fury Special and Fatal Fury: Wild Ambition. Unlike the battle against Geese in Art of Fighting 2, the battles against Ryo in both games are depicted as "dream matches" and are not canonical to either series' storyline. However, multiple Art of Fighting characters make canonical appearances in the story of Fatal Fury: City of the Wolves, set over 25 years after the events of Art of Fighting 3, with Mr. Big appearing as a playable character via downloadable content.

As a result of these crossover appearances between the two franchises, SNK produced The King of Fighters series, pitting characters from both series against each other. The series eschews the continuity of the Art of Fighting and Fatal Fury games for the purpose of having the Art of Fighting cast fight against everyone else without aging them. Ryo, Robert, Yuri, and King were introduced in the first installment and have appeared in nearly every entry, with Takuma and Kasumi frequently appearing as well. Eiji and Mr. Big also appear as playable characters in specific entries.

Characters from the series have also appeared in the SNK vs. Capcom series and in NeoGeo Battle Coliseum. Capcom's Capcom vs. SNK: Millennium Fight 2000 features Ryo, Yuri, and King while Capcom vs. SNK 2 adds Ryuhaku Todoh to the lineup. SNK vs. Capcom: SVC Chaos features Ryo, Kasumi, and Takuma under his Mr. Karate guise. NeoGeo Battle Coliseum features Lee Pai Long, Mr. Big and an aged Robert Garcia along with the older Ryo Sakazaki from Buriki One. In KOF: Maximum Impact 2, Ryuhaku Todoh drives the truck in one of the extra games.

In Super Smash Bros. Ultimate, some elements from the Art of Fighting series appear as downloadable content; specifically, two music tracks from the series appear (and can be played on the King of Fighters Stadium stage), Ryo Sakazaki makes three cameos in the game (as a background character in King of Fighters Stadium, as a spirit, and as the basis for a Mii costume), and Yuri Sakazaki and King both have background cameos in King of Fighters Stadium.

=== Film ===
A Japanese animated television film, Art of Fighting (バトルスピリッツ 龍虎の拳, Battle Spirits Ryūko no Ken), was created and directed by Hiroshi Fukutomi, animated by Studio Comet and produced by NAS. It was the third animated co-production between SNK and NAS, following Fatal Fury: Legend of the Hungry Wolf and Fatal Fury 2: The New Battle. The special was produced by Kenji Shimizu and Yoshiro Kataoka, and features a script by Nobuaki Kishima and character designs by Kazunori Iwakura. The film follows Ryo and Robert, who must rescue Yuri from Mr. Big after he kidnaps her to learn the whereabouts of a valuable diamond. The film aired on Fuji TV on 23 December 1993, and received an English-language release from US Manga Corps in 1997.

The Art of Fighting film was negatively received by several western publications. It was billed as stupid, idiotic and plodding, and compared to a Saturday morning cartoon. It was said it had "choppy animation, illogical perspectives, uninspired art, badly choreographed fight scenes, and most of all horrible voice acting", and none of the interest of the video game or its sequels translate into the anime. The film gathered a 14% rating at Meta Anime Reviews, placing it in the bottom 3% of the reviewed titles.

The 2010 live-action film The King of Fighters features an appearance by Mr. Big, played by Sam Hargrave. He is the only character from the Art of Fighting series to appear in the film.

== Reception ==
Critical response to the game has been negative when it came to the gameplay and positive to the visuals. Nintendo Life was negative to the game, considering it a poor game from SNK that cannot compete similar games like Street Fighter II, citing few playable characters, limited gameplay and a strong enemy AI despite still praising the graphics. GameSpot agreed citing the visuals as one of the best ones in Neo Geo but criticized the " underlying gameplay is nearly devoid of soul." He specifically said this due to the requirements needed to perform special moves and called the game a Street Fighter "knock off". In regards to how the media saw the character, Wesley Yin-Poole of Videogamer.com commented that Ryo and Robert are "two double-hard bastards": The two were often compared to the Street Fighter protagonists Ryu and Ken Masters due to physical similarities and moves, eventually leading Capcom to create their joke character Dan Hibiki from the Street Fighter. Dan was meant to be a joke about both Ryo and Robert as SNK "stole the talent" from their own company when they started making their own Street Fighter sequels. Director Toyohisa Tanabe decided to make Yuri a strong character despite her background and often borrowed techniques from Capcom fighting games out of respect in a fast fashion.

The sequel was praised by both GamePro and Electronic Gaming Monthly for having far better graphics, sound, character selection and gameplay technique than the original Art of Fighting, though three of EGM's four reviewers complained that in single player mode the opponent AI is "incredibly cheap". Nintendo Life found the game superior to the first one due to its improved single player mode as well as system though he still had mixed feeling about the enjoyment the fighting system can give. Yuri has been well received by Japanese gamers, having been voted as the 19th favorite character in the 1997 character popularity poll on Neo Geo Freak's website. In 1995, Japanese magazine Gamest ranked her as number seven in the list of the top characters of 1994. In 2018, Yuri was voted as the tenth most popular Neo Geo character. Tiago O. Frosi from Universidade Federal do Rio Grande do Sul regarded Yuri as one of the most impactful female characters in fighting game history due to how she initially debuts as a damsel in distress only to become a playable character both in the sequel and SNK's crossover video games. She was compared with Street Fighter character Sakura Kasugano for having similar archetypes as well as an imitated fighting style from veteran fighters.

In retrospect, HardcoreGaming101 noted Art of Fighting 3 "is a drastic step away from its predecessors", comparing Robert's story to "a Jekyll and Hyde. They compared the gameplay to Virtua Fighter and Tekken despite the usage of 2D graphics but reliance of 3D style." Nintendo Life scored it a 7 out of 10, praising the simplistic and faithful fighting game system but the changes that evoke 3D design. There were mixed responses to the story mode for the lack of cutscenes but large amount of dialogues that explore each character. In comparing previous games, the fighting system felt improved over previous Art of Fighting games and the polishing of new character sprites. The fact that the gamers can still zoom in and out when getting closer to the enemies was still praised by the reviewer. In conclusion, they found it as an appealing game despite not being up to the level of SNK's most famous games The King of Fighters '98 and Garou: Mark of the Wolves. IGN and Eurogamer instead felt that Art of Fighting 3 was a massive improvement over the series with the latter praising the visuals used for characters sprites and victory scenes. They found the new touches of the gameplay to be add replay value especially as the Deperation Moves become more strategic if the players want to win with their first round. IGN feels like the game is the most modern fighting game in the Art of Fighting compilation thanks to the graphics' improvements especially for such an old software it was originally released.

In a cutscene from the first Art of Fighting game, Ryo says "I have no choice but to use the Haoh Shokoken" (覇王翔吼拳を使わざるを得ない, Haōshōken o tsukawazaruoenai) while he is driving a bike in his fighting clothes. According to PR Times, this became an internet meme based on how hilarious it is that a man is driving while wearing a karate gi. This became popular in some Internet communities, regardless of the excitement it generated among individuals. It then spread to the Westerns and has become one of the classic internet memes in the fighting game world, such as marketing for the visual novel The King of Fighters For Girls.

== See also ==
- List of The King of Fighters characters
- Characters of the Fatal Fury series
- List of fighting games
