= List of MegaMan NT Warrior media =

The following is media and release information for the MegaMan NT Warrior anime and manga series, known in Japan as Rockman EXE (ロックマンエグゼ, Rokkuman Eguze). The former is composed of five anime series (EXE, Axess, Stream, Beast, Beast+) and one feature-length film. The anime series began on March 4, 2002, in Japan, and EXE and Axess were subsequently adapted in English, airing May 17, 2003.

The film, Rockman EXE: Program of Light and Dark, aired in Japan on March 12, 2005.

== DVD & VHS releases ==
In Japan, every episode of the anime has been released across sixty-five DVDs usually containing three episodes per disc. In the United States, thirteen DVDs have been released covering the original 52 episodes of EXE. The first six volumes were also released in VHS form. Currently, there are no plans to release the English version of Axess on DVD.

== Theme songs ==
=== Opening themes ===
Title	Vocalist	Episode #
Break Through the Wind (Kaze wo Tsukinukete)	Jin Hashimoto	EXE 1-56
Two Futures (Futatsu no Mirai)	Michihiro Kuroda	Axess 1-51
Be Somewhere	Buzy	Stream 1-51
Song of Victory (Shouri no Uta)	Dandelion	Beast 1-25
Cross Fusion Remix (version 3)	None	Beast+ 1-26
Feel The Wind	None	EXE (Korea) 1-56

=== Ending themes ===
Title	Vocalist	Episode #
Piece of Peace	Mika	EXE 1-25
begin the TRY	Showtaro Morikubo	EXE 26–56
At the Place Where Light Reaches (Hikari Todoku Basho)	Kumiko Higa and Akiko Kimura	Axess 1-51
Doobee Doowap Communication	babamania	Stream 1-25
At the Place Where Light Reaches - Symbol of Friendship (Hikari Todoku Bashou - Yūjō no Shirushi)	Kumiko Higa and Akiko Kimura	Stream 26–51
Footprints (Ashiato)	Clair	Beast 1-25

=== Other themes ===
Title	Vocalist
Install Your HEART (Anata no HEART ni Install)	Sakura Nogawa
Hole-Digging Rascals	Unknown at present time

== Soundtracks ==
=== Sound Navigation 01 ===
Rockman Sound Navigation 01

Soundtrack album by Jin Hashimoto, Mika, EXE background themes
- Released: August 28, 2002
- Genre: Soundtracks
- Label: Avex

This soundtrack contains background music and a few theme songs from the first Area of the original EXE series. Although the soundtrack's title implies a second Sound Navigation may have been released, one was never announced, possibly due to poor sales.

1. Rockman's Theme: Break Through the Wind (TV-Sized) (1:28)
2. N1 Grand Prix Commencement Compilation (1:34)
3. Enzan (2:22)
4. Program Advance (2:22)
5. Battle Parade (2:12)
6. Plug-In! Rockman (version 1) (2:00)
7. Aggressor (1:32)
8. Grand Prix Battle (1:59)
9. Suspense (2:00)
10. Destiny's Door (1:50)
11. Charge! Commander Beef (1:41)
12. N1 Grand Prix Fierce Fight Compilation (1:40)
13. Net Battle (1:14)
14. Cruising (0:52)
15. Battle Pressure (2:28)
16. Plug-In! Rockman! (version 2) (1:35)
17. Chase! (1:18)
18. There Goes the Dashing Masa (1:14)
19. Tranquil Afternoon (0:54)
20. Oriental Magic (1:51)
21. Comical (1:49)
22. Elec 'n' Rock (1:17)
23. Fires of the World (1:25)
24. Netto (1:13)
25. WWW Theme (1:29)
26. Mystery (0:40)
27. Labyrinth (1:22)
28. Upper-Class Society (0:44)
29. Rockman's Theme: Break Through the Wind (Ballad) (2:17)
30. Rockman's Theme: Break Through the Wind (BGM) (1:28)
31. Piece of Peace (TV-Sized) (1:34)
32. Bonus Track: Enzan (Mark 1) (1:37)
33. Bonus Track: Program Advance (Mark 1) (2:22)
34. Bonus Track: Plug-In! Rockman! (Mark 1) (1:27)

=== Vocal Album ===
Rockman EXE Vocal Album

Soundtrack album by Various
- Released: March 28, 2007
- Genre: Soundtracks
- Label: Sony

This album contains every opening and closing theme song from EXE through Beast as well as two bonus songs available in the first print of the album (indicated by the asterisk beside the track listing). However, most of the songs are in their broadcast TV-Sized lengths, presumably because full-length versions were never recorded.

1. Rockman's Theme: Break Through the Wind (Jin Hashimoto) (from EXE; 4:28)
2. Piece of Peace (TV-Sized) (Mika) (from EXE; 1:34)
3. begin the TRY (Showtaro Morikubo) (from EXE; 3:27)
4. Two Futures (TV-Sized) (Michihiro Kuroda) (from Axess; 1:30)
5. At the Place Where Light Reaches (TV-Sized) (Kumiko Higa and Akiko Kimura as Netto and Rockman) (from Axess; 1:29)
6. Be Somewhere (Buzy (band)) (from Stream; 4:59)
7. Doobee Doowop Communication (babamania) (from Stream; 3:55)
8. At the Place Where Light Reaches - Symbol of Friendship (TV-Sized) (Kumiko Higa and Akiko Kimura as Netto and Rockman) (from Stream; 1:30)
9. Song of Victory (Dandelion) (from Beast; 4:12)
10. Footprints (Clair) (from Beast; 4:50)
11. Heart Wave (TV-Sized) (Misato Fukuen as Misora) (from Mega Man Star Force; 1:02) *
12. Install Your HEART (Sakura Nogawa as Aki) (from EXE; 1:50) *

== Episode list ==
The anime is composed of five series: EXE (56 episodes), Axess (51), Stream (51), Beast (25), Beast+ (26), and one feature-film. The anime series began on March 4, 2002, in Japan, and EXE and Axess were subsequently adapted in English, airing May 17, 2003. Currently, there are no plans for English adaptations of Stream, Beast, Beast+, or the movie.

== Manga publication ==
- Japan: Shogakukan's CoroCoro Comic
- United States and Canada: VIZ Media

== References and notes ==
- XEBEC's Rockman EXE Stream anime page
- XEBEC's Rockman EXE Beast anime page
- XEBEC's Rockman EXE Beast+ anime page
