= Rockman EXE Phantom of Network =

2004 video game

- Publisher: Capcom
- Platform: Mobile Phone
- Release: JP: October 4, 2004
- Genre: Real-time tactical role-playing game
- Mode: Single-player

Rockman EXE Phantom of Network (ロックマン エグゼ ファントム オブ ネットワーク, Rokkuman Eguze Fantomu obu Nettowāku) is a 2004 video game in the Mega Man Battle Network series for mobile phones developed by Capcom. The game was only released and made available in Japan. It is most well known for featuring five original characters that did not appear in any other video games: the magician Mr. Hat (Mr.ハット, Misutā Hatto) with his NetNavi HatMan (ハットマン, Hattoman) and son Shuichi Ubochi (烏星 修一, Ubochi Shuichi), as well as the NetNavis JammingMan (ジャミングマン, Jaminguman) and Cache. All of these characters, however, appeared in the Rockman EXE anime series. The game was followed by a 2006 Japan-exclusive sequel for mobile phones entitled Rockman EXE Legend of Network.

As of January 1, 2018, Phantom of Network, along with Legend of Network, has been taken offline and is no longer available for purchase.
