= List of The King of Fighters manga chapters =

There are multiple manga adaptations of SNK's The King of Fighters fighting games series. During 1995 Tatsuya Shingyoji wrote a manga adaptation of The King of Fighters '94. It was serialized in Monthly Shōnen Ace published by Kadokawa Shoten and collected into four tankōbon volumes. They were released from February 10, 1995, to December 1996. Ryo Takamisaki wrote a six volume adaptation based on the first game of the series known as The King of Fighters '94: Gaiden, and one from KOF '96 which Shinseisha published in three tankōbon compilations from June 1996 to February 1998.

There is also a spin-off manga story based on the adventures of the characters from The King of Fighters '96 centered around Kyo and Iori's rivalry entitled The King of Fighters: Kyo. It was written by Masato Natsumoto and published by Kodansha in three tankōbon volumes between 1997 and 1998. The King of Fighters: A New Beginning is a shōnen manga authored by Kyōtarō Azuma. It is based on the events of The King of Fighters XIV. The series was serialized in Kodansha's Magazine Pocket since January 2018, ending in August 2020.

== Volumes ==
=== The King of Fighters '94: Gaiden ===
No.	Release date	ISBN
1		9784881991688
ACT.1 闘いへのテイク・オフ; ACT.2 再会、そして出会い; ACT.3 一人ぼっちの二人; ACT.4 敗者からのメッセージ
In the upcoming The King of Fighters tournament, Yuri Sakazaki is depressed when her family does not allow her be part of the team: Ryo Sakazaki, Takuma Sakazaki and Robert Garcia. Mai Shiranui also wants to join the tournament but is unable to join Andy Bogard's team composed of her brother Terry Bogard and muay thai fighters Joe Higashi. As a result, Yuri instead joins a team composed of female fighters who accept her: Mai Shiranui and King.
2		9784881991893
ACT.5 虚飾のファイティングロード; ACT.6 誇りある選択; ACT.7 戦士達の宴; ACT.8 豹変のキム
During preparations for the tournament, King's brother is kidnapped by a criminal but he is saved by newcomer Kyo Kusanagi who is supported by his teammates Goro Daimon and Benimaru Nikaido. Eventually, King's, Terry's, Ryo's and Kyo's teams meet in the ceremony of the tournament's beginning where they clash while the Psycho Soldier team composed of Athena Asamiya, Sie Kensou and Chin Gentsai and the Ikari Warriors composed of the military Heidern, Ralf Jones and Clark Still foresee an unknown chaos. Martial artist Kim Kaphwan releases Chang Koehan and Choi Bounge from prison to make them join his team. They face Yuri's team in the first fight of the tournament.
3		9784881992111
ACT.9 歪んだ希望を砕け!!; ACT.10 驚愕のアメリカン・ドリームス; ACT.11 N.Y.決戦; ACT.12 死闘の中の栄光
In the first rounds of the tournament Yuri manages to defeat Chang and Choi despite suffering multiple wounds and Kim gives up. In the next match, the Female Fighters Team faces a team composed of fighters with three skills famous the United States. Mai faces Brian Battler in the first match and both are disqualified for being removed from the ring. Yuri defeats Lucky Glauber in the second round while King confronts Heavy D! in the next match.
4	March 25, 2011	9784881992517
ACT.13 敗れし者としてではなく; ACT.14 巨大なる悪の影; ACT.15 甦る悪夢; ACT.16 それぞれの想い それぞれの闘い; ACT.17 哀しみのリベンジャー
Although King loses to Heavy D!, her team progresses. Before the next matches, Ralf and Clark ambush the host Rugal Bernstein who is responsible for the death of Heidern's family. Rugal easily defeats Heidern's teammates, wounds Mai and Yuri but agress to stop the fight when confronting Kyo and move on with the tournament. The wounded Clark faces King in the next round and is defeated. Ralf tries to face King but Heidern discovers his states and makes him give up. Heidern defeats King but loses to Mai. With the Yuri's team winning, the tournament moves to a fight betweeen Ryo's and Terry's teams.
5	March 25, 2011	9784881993002
ACT.18 激突!! 狼の牙VS極限の拳; ACT.19 勝敗を越えた闘い; ACT.20 砕かれた自信; ACT.21 雪辱の蒼き閃光
Andy confronts Takuma but is defeated by the Sakazaki. However, both suffer wounds resulting in Robert and Joe replacing their teammates. Once again, the two fighters take out each other, resulting in a final match between Ryo and Terry to defeat the winning team. With the fight resulting into a double knock out, the two teams are eliminated from the tournament. In the next fights, the Japanese Team faces the Chinese Team with Daimon and Athena being the first enemies. Athena wins the first match and Benimaru replaces Daimon, taking down his rival in the aftermath. Chin defeats Benimaru who is replaced by Kyo.
6		9784881993170
ACT.22 束の間の平穏; ACT.23 牙を剥く恐怖; ACT.24 See you again
Kyo defeats both Chin and Sie in the tournament, resulting in the victory of the Japanese Team. As the fighters rest, Yuri is able to make up with her brother. For the next match, the Japanese Team faces Yuri's but are interrupted by the criminal and host Rugal. The two teams head to Rugal's location where Kyo finds that his missing father, Saisyu, already fought Rugal and ended up suffering multiple wounds, leaving him nearly dying in front of his son. Rugal and his secretary Mature easily take down most of their enemies but Kyo manages to avenge his father by incinerating Rugal with Athena's help. When Heidern arrives, Rugal selfdestructs the area but the fighters manage to escape.

=== The King of Fighters G ===
No.	Release date	ISBN
1	May 1997	488199350X
Athena Asamiya decides to investigate Kyo Kusanagi's feud with the Orochi. Before the 1996 tournament, Kyo is defeated by Hakkeshu servant Goenitz and decides to participate in the tournament to have his revenge. In the process, Hakkeshu Mature joins Kyo and Athena's team while Vice joins Iori Yagami's and Benimaru Nikaido's team.
2		—
Across the tournament Kyo's and Iori's teams progress easily with Iori nearly killing Terry Bogard from the Fatal Fury Team with his brutal techniques. In the aftermath, Mai Shiranui is victim of the Orochi curse but Kyo and Athena manage to save her.
3	May 1997	9784881992111
As Kyo and Benimaru fight each other in the tournament, the curse of the Orochi starts affecting most participants with Benimaru blinding Kyo when believing he was defeated. The curse affects Leona who is saved by Ralf and Clark but Iori instead kills Vice and Mature. During this chaos, Goenitz presents himself having tortured Chizuru Kagura. With help of Iori and Athena, the blind Kyo is able to incinerate Goenitz and peace returns to the area.

=== The King of Fighters: Kyo ===
No.	Release date	ISBN
1	December 10, 1996	9784063197594
During The King of Fighters 1995 tournament, the Esaka Team composed of Kyo Kusanagi, Benimaru Nikaido and Goro Daimon become the champions by defeating Iori Yagami's Rival Team, Kyo's brainwashed father Saisyu and the host Rugal Bersntein. After Rugal dies by not being able to control the power of the demon Yamata no Orochi, the tournament ends with Kyo returning to school in Osaka. Athena Asamiya and Sie Kensou visit his school with the intention of learning his clan's history. Meanwhile, Iori Yagami's hatred for Kyo causes him to challenge him again telling him he will kill his girlfriend Yuki if he does not fight. Kyo fights Iori in a street fight which becomes deadlier with every move. Athena interrupts the fight, sensing a sense of innocence despite Iori's ruthless behavior. After the fight, Kyo becomes unstable as a result of the power Iori developed.
2	May 1, 1997	978-4063197976
After receiving his father, Kyo believes he lost part of his power following his encounter with Iori and has problems summoning the Kusanagi flames. Kyo is corrupted by the demon Yamata no Orochi which results in him developing blue flames like Iori the next time the two fight in the streets. Saisyu interrupts the fight and tries to discipline Kyo to remember his original decision to which he decided to train as a kid. In the aftermath, Kyo recovers his original flames. Iori later meets two followers of Orochi Vice and Mature who enter his house without his permission. Meanwhile, Kyo, Yuki, Athena and Sie later rest in a park where Saisyu explains that their predecessor, Kusanagi, was a skilled martial artist who train alongside Iori's predecessor, Yasakani. However, Yasakani was cursed by Orochi and became one of his followers.
3	May 1, 1999	9784063340709
Athena sends a letter of challenge to Iori under Kyo's name but in the form of a karaoke. Iori accepts the challenge and both Kyo's and Iori's team start training for the showdown. However, in the day of the fight, a follower of Orochi named Goentiz takes down Vice and Mature and kidnaps Iori. An angered Kyo tries to confront Goentiz but is interrupted by Chizuru Kagura, a fighter whose predecessor kept the Orochi Seal after Kusanagi and Yasakani defeated the demon 18000 years ago. Kyo recovers and notices Iori's cursed state. After freeing Iori with his flames, Kyo manages to defeat Goenitz with his Mu Shiki technique. Kyo then decides to train to face Goenitz again in the next King of Fighters tournament.

=== The King of Fantasy ===
No.	Release date	ISBN
1	June 4, 2020	9784040646749
During the Orochi arc, Kyo and Iori find themselves in an alternate world where most fighters have alternates versions.
2	October 2, 2020	9784040659701

=== The King of Fighters Side Story: The Origin of Flame ===
No.	Release date	ISBN
1	December 3, 2021	9784065260203
Kyo's student Shingo Yabuki finds himself in the past during the Kamakura period where Iori Yagami's predecessor Magai Yasakani imprisons him. After seeing his fighting style, Magai decides to show him Kusanagi who trained alongside him. Both Kusanagi and Yasakani fight creatures Shingo believes are related to Orochi.
2	July 7, 2022	9784065280003
Shingo sees the feud between the Kusanagi and the Yasakani that would turn their clans into enemies and the latter renamed Yagami following their corruption by Orochi. As he returns to the future, Shingo tries to make peace with Iori who instead beats him.
