= Tactical Roar =

Japanese anime television series

- Official Blu-Ray box cover from Japan

タクティカルロア (Takutikaru Roa)
- Anime television series
- Directed by: Yoshitaka Fujimoto
- Produced by: Jun Yukawa; Manabu Santou
- Written by: Kazuho Hyodo
- Music by: Hikaru Nanase
- Studio: Actas
- Original network: TV Kanagawa, Chiba TV, TV Saitama, TV Aichi, Sun TV, KBS Kyoto
- Original run: January 8, 2006 – April 2, 2006
- Episodes: 13

Tactical Roar (タクティカルロア, Takutikaru Roa) is a Japanese anime television series centered around the mostly female crew of a commercial Warship, the Pascal Magi, which is trying to fight pirates in the near future. The series is mix of serious combat, political intrigue, light romance, and comedy, a classic story of the underdogs trying prove their worth amidst superior enemies, and doubtful arrogant allies. The series was produced with mix of traditional and computer generated animation. This was an anime produced with cooperation from the Japanese Self-Defense Force (JSDF) during a period that there was no collaboration between anime producers and fandoms of similar types of anime.

The show was broadcast on TV Kanagawa, Chiba TV, TV Saitama, TV Aichi, Sun TV and KBS Kyoto. Reportedly, the Pascal Magi was based on the Murasame-class destroyer, and the ship in the show was given a designation with the consent of the JSDF, which the producers worked with to create realistic battle scenes and models for the anime. The theme song, ending theme, and background music for the show were created by Lantis Co., Ltd.

== Premise ==
In the near future, a hypercane has appeared in the Pacific Ocean, causing a series of worldwide climate changes. This storm, dubbed the "Grand Roar," has been stable for over 50 years. Climate changes make air travel and transport less reliable, and thus the world has begun reverting to a second naval age, particularly in the Asian region. However, the world's condition also heralds the return of piracy and the growth of maritime terrorism, causing many large international companies to arm themselves and setting up their own private naval security forces.

At the outset of the series, Systems Engineer Hyōsuke Nagimiya runs into the crew of the Pascal Magi, one such maritime security ship. He gets into a few typical compromising situations before finally being introduced as a software engineer assigned to update the systems on board the ship. He meets his stepsister, the captain of the war vessel, Captain Nanaha Misaki, who treats him as a stranger. Although he refers to her as 'sister,' he still thinks of her as a woman nonetheless. During the duration of his duties, the ship is called into combat, where Hyosuke begins to understand the nature of the Pascal Magi and its crew's battle potential as the vessel flings itself into the fight.

== Cast ==
=== Main characters ===
- Hyōusuke Nagimiya (voiced by Hisayoshi Suganuma) was brought onto the Pascal Magi to upgrade the ship's computers. At first like many others he believed that his sister's ship wouldn't be able to do much against pirates and was surprised that it had a completely female crew. However, after seeing their skill and the ship's prowess in battle, he began to have respect and admiration for them. He calls the captain Nana-nee since they grew up together but sees her as a woman instead of a step-sister. He still keeps with him the compass Misaki gave him when they were children. In an interview with the show's cast, Suganama said she saw Hyousuke and Nanaha more as friends than lovers.
- Nanaha "Nanami" Misaki (voiced by Mai Nakahara) is the captain of the ship and has a cold and professional attitude and cares very much for her crew. Even though she can be quite serious most of the time, when her crew mates are put in danger or do something dangerous for her she turns into a crybaby. Nanaha can also be quite childish, she uses a character OS for her desktop and started whacking Tanya when she found out. She sees Hyousuke as a little brother as they are step siblings but then later questions herself if she actually likes him. Whenever she is alone with Hyousuke, she drops her serious attitude and refers to him with more familiarity. A lot of things happened to her in the military and she regrets not having the time to contact Hyousuke. In the same interview with the show's cast, Nakahara said she tried to exude the impression of being the "perfect" captain and the "perfect" girl.
- Tsubasa Watatsumi (voiced by Mikako Takahashi) is a pilot on the ship and seems to hate men. However this seems to just be a facade she puts so she can appear stronger in front of them. After a short while she seems to like Hyousuke and later confesses. In a cast interview, Takahashi said that Tsubasa liked Hyousuke because he is messy, with the bonds between them deepening through the various battles.
- Sango Fukami (voiced by Kana Ueda) is a crewman on the ship and has a very wild imagination. She works in and is the head of the engine room and has close friends on the ship. In an interview with the cast, Ueda said that her character was "able to overcome the death of my best friend" and grow from that.
- Miharu Kairi (voiced by Yumiko Kobayashi) is a very smart young girl who developed the battle system Nav-Staff OS for the ship. It is apparent she has a genius intellect after she mentioned in a conversation with Hyousuke that she developed her first program when she was three and is easily able to do things Hyousuke cannot after programming for years. She seems to have developed a crush on Hyousuke since the first time she sees him. In a cast interview, Kobayashi said that she had a lot of fun playing Miharu and found it rewarding, noting the childlike qualities Miharu had.
- Manatsu Akoya (voiced by Kumiko Higa) is a twin sister to Mashu and a gunner on the ship. She has blond pigtails and like her sister she likes playing tricks on people and combat. She runs communications. In an interview with the show's cast, Higa stated that she the importance of Manatsu and Mashu as twins.
- Mashū Akoya (voiced by Satomi Arai) is a twin sister to Manatsu and also a gunner on the ship. She and her sister both like combat and also like to play tricks on others. She lets her hair down and is longer. She runs observations. In a cast interview, Arai said that Mashu and Mantsu are friends who have something in common, using the same cosmetics, and so much more.
- Mitori Shimabara (voiced by Junko Minagawa) is the ship's physician and is very kind and friendly to everyone and is a constant flirt, especially to Hyousuke even though she is married, as shown in the episodes "Scenery With K" and "Sunset Festival," which is why some have stated that she is bisexual. When she is drunk she likes to play with the captain.
- Tanya L. Kojima (voiced by Kaya Miyake) is the Vice-Captain of the ship and very loyal to the Captain who is more of a friend than a boss. They even went to the Naval Academy together. Whenever she is drunk she becomes possessive of the captain and will get into fights with Mitori over her. In an interview with the show's cast, Miyake, she said that while Tanya doesn't have anything to do with romance, "everyone is longing for" for Hyousake, with Tanya different than any of the other characters.
- Clio Aquanaut (voiced by Rio Natsuki) is the bisexual "player" of the crew, with many girls after her, meaning she lives to seek sexual variety, rather than having a long-term romantic relationship. She likes to tease and flirt with Hyousuke as well as anyone else and is the Weapons Chief. In a cast interview, Natsuki said that there aren't as many nurses in animated shows, saying that she isn't "a chill woman" but is rather taking "good care of the crew's heart." In another interview, she says that Clio "seems to like both men and women."

=== Supporting characters ===
- Lemala Hamaguchi (voiced by Daiki Nakamura) is the ships overseer from the company Haru-Nico that owns the ship and is very judgmental of the crew and its captain.
- Kunio Okamachi (voiced by Kenji Nomura) is the manager of the Haru-Nico Security Company for which the Pascal Magi is part of, supporting the ship, admired as a boss, and formerly part of the army.
- Remara Hamaguchi (voiced by Hamaguchi Remara) is the insurance department supervisor of Haru-Nico, and is often self-centered, although also timid and opportunistic.
- Wujifushi Keigoro (voiced by Shinpachi Tsuji) is captain of a ship affiliated with the Pascal Mahi, the Coleman, claiming that "a woman is not needed on the destroyer" and is respected by the Himico leadership.
- Jardimmar Esterella (voiced by Mai Kadowaki) is vice-president of the East Ruth Republic, although also a 14-year-old girl, and has well-educated parents, while preferring old ships like the Pascal Magi, and since she greets everyone who enters her kingdom with a kiss, including women, this makes Nanaha uncomfortable
- Furūdo (Fluid) (voiced by Rina Sato) is a female terrorist who had traveled through numerous organizations and is acting with a certain belief, although she claims to be "free."
- Furōto (Float)(voiced by Akino Watanabe) is a twin sister of Furūdo, wearing gorgeous gothic lolita fashion and is accompanied by an 8mm film camera. She is also a so-called "free" terrorist.
- Hassan (voiced by Shoto Kashii) is a man who was "hunting for an escort ship," claiming to be a captain, actually a pirate.
- Beyond Rush (voiced by Keisuke Fujita) is an active university student and was fascinated by Enoki, trying to outsmart the Pascal Magi.

=== Other characters ===
- Jornada (voiced by Ryuka Yuki) is one of the secretaries of Esterella, having a cool and calm personality, even giving strong opinions to Estellara.
- Vent is a giant that serves as a guardian of the East Ruth Republic, accompanying Esterella and Jornada.
- President Mariscos is the president of the East Ruth Republic and is only mentioned by name, with his brute force leading to revolt, and an armed resistance movement against the government.
- Rydir's representative (voiced by Hidetoshi Nakamura) is the president of the conglomerate of large conglomerates and after the Grand Roar, he succeeds in rapidly fostering enterprises centered on the munitions industry and formed the world's best corporate alliance.
- Toutetsu (voiced by Yoshino Ohashi) is a former professor of political science at Rush's staff
- Regen (voiced by Junko Minagawa) is a developer of a hacking program "Provencal" and is relatively intelligent.
- Hakubi (voiced by Mamiko Noto) is secretary and advisor of Ridil's representative and a drafter of a nine-proposition thesis which supports the activities of Ridil who is striving to realize it.
- Ranburufisshu (voiced by Keichi Sonobe) is an elder of the “Olfat” tribe living in Taaloa Island, a resort area.
- Mysterious girl who appears in almost all stories, with long black hair with golden eyes, a black dress and a light pink shawl, and a flower that looks like a hibiscus on her head.
- Seiko Totti has red short hair and a yellow dress, serving as a person does work for villains.
- Kasato Satoshi (voiced by Eri Nakao) is a first lieutenant, radar member, a sister of three daughters, and is well trusted by Nanaha.
- Suzune Nijiura (voiced by Akari Higuchi) is a first-class lieutenant and helmsman, who looks like a child among the three daughters.
- Mizumo Ayuhara (voiced by Fuoka Oura) is a first-class lieutenant and speed transmission member.
- Asarigi Yui (voiced by Ryoko Ono) is a second lieutenant, part of the artillery department, and is one of the subordinates that Clio trusts.
- Aina Emi (voiced by Akari Higuchi) is part of the CIC crew, a third-class captain, and part of the artillery department.
- Kamegaki Mamiko, part of the CIC crew, a third-class lieutenant, and part of the communication department.
- Colon Amata (voiced by Eri Nakao) is part of the CIC crew, a second lieutenant, and she is part of the communication department.
- Mayor Lucca, is part of the CIC crew, a third captain, and she is part of the observation department.
- Saika Lee (voiced by Junko Minagawa) is part of the CIC crew, a second lieutenant, and he is part of the observation department.
- Isomura Hayase (voiced by Fuoka Oura) is part of the engine room crew, a first-class lieutenant, engine department, and is an emergency chief.
- Tateyama Honami (voiced by Ryoko Ono) is part of the engine room crew, a first-class lieutenant, engine department, and a chief engineer.
- Sasahara Sakura (voiced by Ami Hikayama) is a third-class lieutenant, part of equipment department, while being cheerful and straightforward.
- Carson Kumiko J. (voiced by Naoko Suzuki) is part of the flight department, a third-class lieutenant, assists pilots, has a bullish personality, and is also one of the crew's most heavy drinkers.
- Rachels Shiina (voiced by Nozomi Kobayashi) is part of the flight department, a third-class lieutenant, and in charge of specific data analysis.

== Episodes ==
No.	Title	Directed by	Written by	Original release date
1	"Aye, Shorty!"	Kenichi Ishikura	Yoshitaka Fujimoto	January 7, 2006
Due to an update on the Pascal Magi, Hyōusuke boards the all-female ship, headed by a captain known as Nanami. The question remains: what challenges lie ahead for the Pascal Magi? What danger will it face?
2	"Her Reasons"	Jirou Fujimoto	Takahashi Shigeruharu	January 14, 2006
The Pascal Magi is attacked by a stealth ship which tries to sink them, headed by pirates of an unknown origin. Nanami rejects resolution and decides a battle cannot be avoided, while Hyōusuke wonders how Nanami has changed since he last knew her.
3	"Smile and True Face"	Kenichi Ishikura	Kaoru Shinmachi	January 21, 2006
The new ship which fired upon the Pascal Magi is determined to be a Western Army ship which had been commendeered by the pirates. Nanaha lies to the military committee so she can keep her position, and her former role in the navy is revealed, while other tensions flare...
4	"A Scenery With K"	Kumano Shibasuke	Takahashi Shigeruharu	January 28, 2006
The Pascal Magi is given the task of guarding the dignitaries which go to a huge ceremony of ships which are part of the Trans-Pacific Union. Gossip, speculation, and delision fly around the crew, especially because Nanaha and Hyōusuke, are sharing the same room. Meanwhile, the terrorist sisters continue their attacks, aiming for escort ships in the future.
5	"Strikeback"	Yoshitaka Fujimoto	Kaoru Shinmachi	February 4, 2006
The ship goes through the infamous area known for traffic jams, and is tasked with delivering the Vice-President of East Ruth to a venue to view ships. This Vice-President seems to like Nanaha a lot, and her kiss unnerves her. The operation of terrorists continues, with nightmares continuing, including a missile attack on a docked fleet of ships, including the Coleman.
6	"Converging Nightmares"	Koji Ito	Takahashi Shigeruharu	February 11, 2006
The Pascal Magi is warned by a patrol aircraft of a storm ahead. They struggle at finding an enemy which they can't see with radar. It remains to be seen whether the ship can survive this crisis...
7	"Eniac Maniac"	Yoshitaka Fujimoto	Kaoru Shinmachi	February 18, 2006
The Pascal Magi continues its journey, but there is a threat from the outside, as someone has hacked the ship. The ship loses its functions, while Miharu determines that the CIC should be independent from the overall network.
8	"Sunset Festival"	Satomi	Takahashi Shigeruharu and Yoshitaka Fujimoto	February 25, 2006
The crew of the Pascal Magi go on vacation on a tropical island. Tsubasa approaches Hyōusuke, inviting him for a walk, while there are tensions between Nanaha and Hyōusuke. On the other side of the island, government officials of Taaroa Island and the Ridil corporation meet on the island.
9	"Butterfly Rush"	Yoshitaka Fujimoto	Kaoru Shinmachi	March 4, 2006
A joint effort between the Western Guard and Haru-Nico carries out an effort to gain control of East Asia while defeating pirates. The Pascal Magi joins the fleet with other ships but wonders about the aims of the operation.
10	"Bottom Line"	Yoshitaka Fujimoto	Koji Ito	March 11, 2006
The pirates and a submarine are surprised, with the Western Guard forces damaged, forced to withdraw, while the Pascal Magi has to engage in anti-submarine measures with only one ship. Preparations increase for a battle and tensions continue to rise...
11	"Flower"	Matsui Carp	Jirou Fujimoto	March 18, 2006
The Pascal Magi has been defeated after chasing an enemy submarine, and sustained heavy casualties. Nanaha has the challenge of visiting the families of those who have died, while others struggle in the aftermath of the battle in the previous episode.
12	"The Ninth Thesis"	Yoshitaka Fujimoto	Yoshitaka Fujimoto	March 25, 2006
Everything continues to decline, with a military coup in the republic nearby East Ruth, with the occupation of the Embassy of East Ruth, and standing against those countries which constitute the Trans-Pacific Union. The guarantee of Haru-Nico decides to send a fleet to evacuate the people of East Ruth, with the Pascal Magi facing a danger that they hadn't faced before...
13	"Outward Bound"	Mizumoto Hazuki	Kaoru Shinmachi	April 1, 2006
The battle over the nine thesis continue, with the Nachromema government army as a puppet of the Ridil corporation, and trying to create a second Grand Roar. While the Pascal Magi and Haru-Nico fleet try to stop the second Grand Roar from being established. The world's fate is in the balance...

== Technology, locations, and terminology ==
There are many weapons shown in the show apart from the Pascal Magi. For instance, the Haru-Nico has frigates designed for commercial escort like the Rajdae class destroyer, Oliver, and Coleman. For the Western Army, there is a flagship, a support fleet flagship, and a destroyer. For the escort hunters, they have large ship which hunts escort ships, a stealth system, a missile boat, a supersonic missile named alfal, a camouflaged container carrier, and a Wecken attack helicopter. Additionally, there is the Wacken system which controls attack helicopters, an attack submarine called the Methusela, an electronic jamming device called an ECM buoy, anti-air mines, and a work research vessel that has the functions of sunken ship and floating dock called Friedkin, and many more.

The show has a number of different locations. One of the key one is Namba Island, a huge man-made island in the Western Pacific Ocean, as it is a small natural island in the center, with a donut-shaped artificial island surrounding it. Additionally, a large train operates on the artificial island, is connected to an airfield with a 4000m-class runway that floats far west of the island. The city is roughly composed of a resort area in the north, a residential area in the northeast, a commercial area in the southeast, an industrial area and a harbor in the south, and a Western Guard base in the southwest. In addition, a hydrogen plant group floats in a semicircular shape concentric with the artificial island on the eastern offshore. The haru-nico security guarantee Nanbajima branch office and the company's wharf are located at a corner of the port on the south side of the island, and the company's ships, including Pascal Mage, are moored. The show's other locations were also affected by the Grand Roar, a huge cyclone that suddenly appeared in the Western Pacific 50 years before the story premiered, the catastrophe caused when the cyclone occurred, and a spiral cloud that extends from the cyclone called the Spiral Band. These locations included the Column Ally, an infamous strait, with general shipping routes compressed due to the influence of the Grand Roar, the small country of East Luz in the Southwest Pacific, which suffers from corruption, poverty, and other issues, the plant nation known as the Republic of Nachroma which started when the refugees who had been generated in large numbers after the Grand Roar and who were discharged from economically vulnerable states living on floating regions. Finally, there is the Sea Realm Movement, a megafloat (artificial island) constructed on the sea should be recognized as a territory, and a movement to claim territorial waters and an exclusive economic zone based on it.

There are a number of terms used in the show. On the Pascal Magi, enemy ships of unknown affiliation which engaged in piracy were defined as "illegal," while condition zebra meant that all ships are now in full control of their combat regime, damage control refers to a department that provides first-aid measures when a ship is damaged by battle. There were also terms to refer to each side of the helm, specific call signs like "Current Alpha" and "Drop One" which both are used by the Pascal Magi. Additionally, the crew used the phrase "Aye, Shorty!" which is a synonym for "Aye, Sir!" (used on the Coleman), meaning that something will be immediately executed. Although the female form should be "Aye, ma'am!", shorty refer to a slang term for attractive women, girlfriends and girls. Also, the phrase "Aye, Fellow!" is uttered by a crew member understands when a crew member reports or makes a statement with "fellow" referring to "colleagues." Finally, Nanaha uses the term "Right over" meaning that she understands the matter, and it seems to be a response word used by the highest commander on the spot.

== Related products ==
On the DVD for the show were seven short episodes, which were not depicted in the main story, directed by Yoshitaka Fujimoto, and storyboarded by Takeshi Ito. These accompanied each episode, along with images noting JSDF coverage, specific images, mechanical drawings of characters, and settings. Two singles of music from the song were introduced, as was the "Tactical Roar" Original Soundtrack. There were also models of the Pascal Magi (manufactured by Pit Road), and two other models of ships from the show. Also on October 6, 2006, Hobby Japan published the Complete Tactical Roar book, the characters were reportedly featured in a comic and an event was held relating to the show in some manner. The anime had a Blu-Ray release on December 24, 2015, with a retail price of 15,000 Yen.

Mai Nakahara, who plays Nanami, and Kana Ueda, who plays Sango, humorously talked on a radio show as their characters. A few years later, in a post announcing a DVD of these records said that Nakahara and Ueda's "logbooks," which aired from November 4, 2005, to June 30, 2006, before the show began airing, were "extremely popular."

== Reception ==
Reception to the show has been generally positive. Some pointed out that this "futuristic science-fiction anime" has comedic moments apart from the "military drama, action, and adventure," with nudity present but "nothing sexual about it," while claiming Nanaha is openly lesbian, pointing out the "strong plot," 3D visuals, and drama. The same reviewer said that the anime run of 13 episodes is "normal for many Japanese anime titles," praising the show's premise, the focus on weather and climate change, focus on science, and the comedic elements. Another reviewer pointed out that Nanaha has been kissed by two characters, her stepbrother, Hyousuke, and Estrela, a vice-president, noting the show's yuri themes and its fan service. Others said that the anime resembled the Girls und Panzer anime due to its realistic military portrayal and "beautiful girl[s]" when reviewing an event with the show's staff. They also praised the "realistic contemporary naval warfare," while noting the anime's romantic and comedic elements.

Other critics praised the marine/naval battle action of the show, with most of the characters as women, and the commitment to the show's production, as part of an article which interviewed some from the show's staff and crew.
