= List of MegaMan NT Warrior episodes (Axess) =

This article covers the second series of the MegaMan NT Warrior anime series titled MegaMan NT Warrior Axess, known in Japan as Rockman EXE Axess (ロックマンエグゼアクセス, Rokkuman Eguze Akusesu). Unlike the original EXE series, Axess has only one part, with 51 episodes. In the English version, only 45 episodes aired in the United States with an additional episode airing in Canada. The last 6 episodes were premiered a few weeks after the airing of the 46th.

Axess premiered in Japan on October 4, 2003, and ran until September 25, 2004. There would be no future breaks in between new Rockman series (unlike the six-month separation between the original EXE and Axess). The English version first aired in the United States when Kids' WB ran "sneak peek" airings of the first episode in November 2004 (and again in December). The series officially began its run on February 28, 2005. Like the original EXE, Kids' WB aired many episodes sporadically and out-of-order. After airing 35 episodes (having skipped one that aired in Canada), the show was suddenly taken off the air after episode 22 aired on September 10, 2005. About three months later, ten more episodes aired between November 28 and December 9, bringing the series to a close and skipping five more episodes.

Axess was meant to promote the Japanese release of Mega Man Battle Network 4 and prominently features characters and concepts from this game. However, it also uses many of the Mega Man Battle Network video games as source material for the almost entirely original plot (including characters that only appeared in Network Transmission). The series is also known for having a much darker tone, more violent battles, and a much less constant cast of characters (for example, EXE regulars Dex and Yai are reduced to guest appearances).

== Episode list ==
Series No.	Dub No.	Title	Directed by	Written by	Original release date	English release date
1	1	"Cross Fusion!"; Transliteration: "Kurosu fyūjon!" (Japanese: クロスフュージョン！)	Tsuyoshi Nagasawa	Kenichi Araki	October 4, 2003	November 22, 2004
Lan, Maylu and Chisao visit the Sci-Labs and witness Dr. Hikari's latest experiment in Dimensional Area technology—CrossFusion, the merger of a NetOp with his/her NetNavi, but the CrossFusion makes a NetOp lose his strength. However, the laboratory is attacked by real-world viruses and the Darkloid NetNavi SavageMan. Lan has no choice but to perform CrossFusion himself and stop SavageMan. After beating SavageMan, Lan passes out, but recovers a few seconds later.
2	2	"NetCity No More!"; Transliteration: "Netto Shiti shōmetsu!" (Japanese: ネットシティ消滅！)	Naoyoshi Kusaka	Kenichi Araki	October 11, 2003	March 1, 2005
After Lan finally wakes up, Dr. Hikari explains the SynchroChip to Lan, the chip that allows CrossFusion. Lan accidentally takes it with him to a museum exhibition on NetCity. A strange UFO appears over NetCity and begins sucking up NetNavis, so MegaMan and Roll jack-in to find SavageMan is responsible. Lan becomes an official NetSaver in this episode.
3	3	"Flowing Dangerous Foam!" / "Bubble Trouble!"; Transliteration: "Jabajaba yabai mizu no awa!" (Japanese: ジャバジャバやばい水の泡！)	Son Seung-hee	Katsuhiko Chiba	October 18, 2003	March 2, 2005
Lan visits the water works factory on a field trip when BubbleMan, a Darkloid NetNavi, attacks. He plans to flood every toilet in DenTech City. Lan uses CrossFusion to thwart him, but because he and MegaMan are bickering, the fusion becomes unstable. Lan and MegaMan stop arguing and work together to defeat BubbleMan.
4	4	"Soul Unison!" / "DoubleSoul!"; Transliteration: "Souru unizon!" (Japanese: ソウルユニゾン！)	Naoyoshi Kusaka	Kenichi Yamada	October 25, 2003	March 3, 2005
When Lan is hired to find out what is causing the city's lights to burn out and destroy themselves, Maylu discovers Lan is a NetSaver. Lan finds himself battling with Darkloid FlashMan only to be interrupted by Maylu, who wishes to help. MegaMan becomes damaged with Roll's clumsy battling style, and Dr. Hikari has to repair him. However, FlashMan strikes again, so Maylu rushes off to defeat FlashMan and amend her mistake. In the end, FlashMan is defeated when MegaMan and Roll fuse their souls together and create RollSoul.
5	5	"Metal Hot Spring! Ow It's Hot!"; Transliteration: "Metaru onsen acchicchi!" (Japanese: メタル温泉アッチッチ！)	Fumihiro Ueno	Kenichi Yamada	November 1, 2003	March 4, 2005
Ms. Mari and Tory take Lan and co. out on a hot springs vacation, but their strict rules make it difficult to relax. Lan also meets Tamako, a gift-shop owner who has a love for NetBattling. She challenges Lan to battle with her NetNavi HeavyMetalMan, but BubbleMan constantly interrupts, seeking revenge on MegaMan.
6	6	"The Most Dangerous Ball Game!" / "A Dangerous Bowling Game!"; Transliteration: "Mottomo kiken na kyūgi!" (Japanese: 最も危険な球技！)	Naoyoshi Kusaka	Masaharu Amiya	November 8, 2003	March 7, 2005
Higsby is desperate to impress Ms. Mari, so he takes her out to go virtual bowling. Lan and Maylu tag along. Meanwhile, bowling expert BowlMan becomes infected with a DarkChip and plans to destroy the bowling alley. Lan CrossFuses to fight back.
7	7	"Electronic Flower Garden!" / "The CyberGarden of Doom!"; Transliteration: "Denshi no hanazono!" (Japanese: 電子の花園！)	Tsuyoshi Nagasawa	Naoko Marukawa	November 15, 2003	March 8, 2005
Darkloid VineMan is attacking all over DenTech City, and he's even trapped Roll in his life-sucking weeds. Mr. Match and HeatMan reappear to help fight, but when HeatMan is damaged, Famous helps in recreating TorchMan. Working with TorchMan, MegaMan creates TorchSoul and burns VineMan to ashes.
8	8	"Friendship in the Mirror"; Transliteration: "Kagami no naka no yūjō" (Japanese: 鏡のなかの友情)	Harume Kosaka	Mayori Sekijima	November 22, 2003	March 9, 2005
Lan investigates a science museum being built when the NetSavers receive word of a possible Darkloid attack. However, it was a set-up by SavageMan. Duplicating Lan's frequency, MegaMan is confronted with an artificial Lan, disabling cooperation with his NetOp.
9	9	"Dekao Returns" / "Dex Returns!"; Transliteration: "Kaettekita Dekao" (Japanese: 帰ってきたデカオ)	Son Seung-hee	Kenichi Araki	November 29, 2003	March 10, 2005
Dex returns to DenTech City, but he's very different. He's been training with the WWW to defeat Lan in a NetBattle. However, Lan has to worry more about BurnerMan, a Darkloid who is attacking all over the city. Dex is determined to prove his strength to Lan, so he intervenes in the battle with BurnerMan. Dex learns from Maylu Lan is a NetSaver. Dex helps Lan in fight with BurnerMan. MegaMan creates GutsSoul to defeat BurnerMan.
10	10	"Threat of the DarkChips!"; Transliteration: "Dāku chippu no kyōi!" (Japanese: ダークチップの脅威)	Naoyoshi Kusaka	Masashi Kubota	December 6, 2003	March 14, 2005
Lan investigates the spread of DarkChips, chips that consume NetNavis with dark energy. During his investigation, Ms. Mari is held hostage in a freezer, and MegaMan must battle with SpikeMan to rescue her. In the end, it's revealed that Ms. Mari was really Ms. Yuri, SpikeMan's NetOp and distributor of the DarkChips.
11	11	"Beat the Safecracker!" / "The Unsafe Safe!"; Transliteration: "Kinkoyaburi o yattsukero!" (Japanese: 金庫破りをやっつけろ！)	Atsushi Ōtsuki	Katsuhiko Chiba	December 13, 2003	March 15, 2005
BurnerMan returns to steal rare metals so more DarkChips can be built. However, every time he strikes, Lan is too late and can't enter the Dimensional Area he creates. Thus, Dr. Hikari teaches him how to enter Dimensional Areas from the outside. Lan perfects the technique and defeats BurnerMan.
12	12	"The Steel Sniper" / "Code of Conduct"; Transliteration: "Kōtetsu no sunaipā" (Japanese: 鋼鉄のスナイパー)	Tsuyoshi Nagasawa	Masaharu Amiya	December 20, 2003	April 11, 2005
While visiting an airplane festival, Lan and MegaMan re-encounter ShadowMan, who is now working with the Darkloids. He seeks the Control X navigational program. While facing him, MegaMan also meets SearchMan, a NetSaver from the country of Sharo, but the two have clashing opinions on morality when SearchMan sacrifices innocent NetNavis to stop ShadowMan.
13	13	"Cross Fusion Disappearance!" / "CrossFusion for All!"; Transliteration: "Kurosufyūjon shōmetsu!" (Japanese: クロスフュージョン消滅！)	Son Seung-hee	Kenichi Yamada	December 27, 2003	April 18, 2005
Lan becomes arrogant with his latest investigation against Darkloid DesertMan. Meanwhile Chaud, a fellow NetSaver, investigates Ms. Yuri, but both heroes fall into traps. Lan CrossFuses against DesertMan, but fails. Chaud makes a surprise appearance using CrossFusion himself to save the day.
14	14	"The Purloined Princess"; Transliteration: "Nusumareta purinsesu" (Japanese: 盗まれたプリンセス)	Harume Kosaka	Masashi Kubota	January 4, 2004	March 17, 2005
Lan and his friends are taken to Kingland by none other than Yai Ayano, who is now living there. It seems the data for AyanoTech's latest game, Strawberry Princess, has been stolen by viruses. She enlists her friends in tracking down the stolen data.
15	15	"The Incredible Guts!"; Transliteration: "Chōjin Gattsu!" (Japanese: 超人ガッツ！)	Naoyoshi Kusaka	Kenichi Araki	January 17, 2004	April 25, 2005
Returning from Kingland, Lan and co. make a detour in Jawaii to visit Dex. Meanwhile, Dex finds a card-scanning device that powers up NetNavis, and he works with the WWW to get his revenge on Lan again. However, the device sends GutsMan rampaging with power (and towering size) through NetCity, taking Roll hostage, King Kong style.
16	16	"Cute! Demon?" / "It's All How You Look at It!"; Transliteration: "Kawaii! Akuma?" (Japanese: カワイイ！悪魔？)	Son Seung-hee	Mayori Sekijima	January 24, 2004	June 6, 2005
Lan meets Shuko, an unlucky and unconfident girl. When her electricity is cut off, her NetNavi SpoutMan decides to go turn it back on for her. However, when caught by security, he begins to cry, causing a huge flood of tears in the internet and deleting the guardian Navis. MegaMan uses NumberSoul to calm SpoutMan down.
17	17	"The Assaulting Beastman!" / "SavageMan Returns!"; Transliteration: "Kyōshū Bīsutoman!" (Japanese: 強襲ビーストマン！)	Tsuyoshi Nagasawa	Kenichi Yamada	January 31, 2004	May 2, 2005
While visiting an exhibit in a tower that floats in the sea, Lan meets Tamako and begins sparring with her. But SavageMan intervenes, burning with dark power, to delete MegaMan. Furthermore, Ms. Yuri sends the tower sinking into the ocean, and Lan drops his PET down a crevice in the floor, leaving MegaMan defenseless against SavageMan. MegaMan defeats SavageMan using HeavyMetalSoul. SavageMan comes to the real world, but is finally deleted.
18	18	"The Man from Sharo"; Transliteration: "Shāro kara kita otoko" (Japanese: シャーロから来た男)	Son Seung-hee	Masaharu Amiya	February 7, 2004	May 9, 2005
Lan meets Raika, the NetSaver from Sharo who operates SearchMan. Lan and Raika have opposing views on the usefulness of CrossFusion, and the two go their separate ways to stop Darkloid VideoMan when he attacks a movie theater. In the end, Raika saves the day without the use of CrossFusion.
19	19	"SearchSoul!"; Transliteration: "Sāchi souru!" (Japanese: サーチソウル！)	Naoyoshi Kusaka	Kenichi Yamada	February 14, 2004	May 16, 2005
Viruses are using cloaking techniques to steal data, and Lan tracks them down to the source of their power: DesertMan. DesertMan gets the upper-hand against MegaMan, and SearchMan is forced to sacrifice MegaMan in order to delete DesertMan. However, SearchMan ignores Raika's orders, and instead, SearchSoul is used to defeat DesertMan.
20	20	"Hand Over the Dark Chip!" / "Dark Secret"; Transliteration: "Dāku chippu o yokose!" (Japanese: ダークチップをよこせ！)	Son Seung-hee	Kenichi Araki	February 21, 2004	May 23, 2005
The NetSavers have taken DesertMan hostage, but the Darkloids want him back. SpikeMan kidnaps Keifer and Manuela and threatens to crush them in a car compactor, but Lan and Famous intervene. However, FlashMan then strikes, and deletes DesertMan, but Chaud reappears and defeats him by using a Program Advance within CrossFusion.
21	21	"ShadeMan's Ambition"; Transliteration: "Shēdoman no yabō" (Japanese: シェードマンの野望)	Harume Kosaka	Masashi Kubota	February 28, 2004	May 30, 2005
After witnessing the dark energy's decay on DesertMan and FlashMan's bodies, ShadeMan begins to distrust the Mysterious Man he's working for. Meanwhile, Lan and Chaud investigate a warehouse where DarkChips are being stored, but they encounter GravityMan (who ShadeMan sent) instead.
22	22	"Bubbleman's Great Friend Strategy" / "BubbleMan's Plan"; Transliteration: "Baburuman no tomodachi daisakusen" (Japanese: バブルマンの友達大作戦)	Shigeru Ueda	Katsuhiko Chiba	March 6, 2004	September 10, 2005
BubbleMan decides that the only way to defeat MegaMan is to use DoubleSoul. In his plan, he befriends IceMan and SpoutMan in hopes of fusing with their power. However, MegaMan intervenes and spoils BubbleMan's plan.
23	23	"Super Energy of Terror" / "The Super Power of Shiver"; Transliteration: "Senritsu no chō enerugī" (Japanese: 戦慄の超エネルギー)	Naoyoshi Kusaka	Mayori Sekijima	March 13, 2004	June 13, 2005
The NetSavers meet Dr. Regal, a researcher who can help stop the Darkloids. While analyzing a Dimensional Area Converter salvaged by Raika, the NetSavers discover that these devices are powered by the souls of deleted NetNavis. Before more analysis can be conducted, Darkloid SparkMan appears and destroys the converter.
24	24	"Red Hot Magma Fight" / "Magma Battle"; Transliteration: "Shakunetsu maguma no tatakai" (Japanese: 灼熱マグマの戦い)	Tsuyoshi Nagasawa	Katsuhiko Chiba	March 20, 2004	June 18, 2005
Chaud investigates another Darkloid attack involving BubbleMan and BurnerMan, leading him to a hot spring that Lan happens to be visiting. The two work together to stop the Darkloids, leading to a battle beneath the Earth's surface within a lake of magma.
25	25	"VideoMan Returns!"; Transliteration: "Bideoman, ritānzu!" (Japanese: ビデオマン、リターンズ！)	Yukio Suzuki	Masaharu Amiya	March 27, 2004	June 25, 2005
VideoMan begins attacking DenTech City with artificial MegaMen that he passes on through VHS tapes. Lan and Chaud track him down, but are forced to battle a slew of CrossFusion MegaMen. In the end, VideoMan is deleted when Chaud uses electromagnetic waves to destroy VideoMan's cloning abilities.
26	26	"Memory of the Blue Flame" / "Anetta's Revenge"; Transliteration: "Aoki honoo no kioku" (Japanese: 青き炎の記憶)	Naoyoshi Kusaka	Masashi Kubota	April 3, 2004	July 2, 2005
The NetSavers meet a girl named Anetta. Chaud befriends her, but she has a dark secret: she's really working for the Darkloids. Months ago, her NetNavi Silk was presumably deleted by ProtoMan, and she plans to trick Chaud into using a DarkChip. Chaud sees through her plan and reveals the truth behind Silk's deletion. Anetta then reveals that Dr. Regal is the leader of Nebula, so Ms. Yuri swiftly kidnaps her.
27	27	"Decisive Battle! Nebula Base" / "Nebula's Secret Base"; Transliteration: "Kessen! Nebyura kichi" (Japanese: 決戦！ネビュラ基地)	Naoyoshi Kusaka	Kenichi Araki	April 10, 2004	July 9, 2005
Anetta is taken to Nebula's base on a transport ship, so Lan and Chaud chase after her. Aboard, they meet Dr. Regal, but ShadeMan intervenes to kill him only to be stopped by Regal's NetNavi, LaserMan. Anetta is rescued, but ShadeMan prepares to detonate the ship with the kids aboard, and he proceeds to defeat MegaMan and ProtoMan. In order to save the day, Chaud uses a DarkChip and creates Dark Protoman, Just before Shademan was about to delete MegaMan, Protoman gives MegaMan his soul and defeats ShadeMan using Protosoul, but ProtoMan vanishes into the darkness.
28	28	"Wavering Heart"; Transliteration: "Yureru kokoro" (Japanese: 揺れる心)	Harume Kosaka	Kenichi Yamada	April 17, 2004	July 16, 2005
Ms. Yuri is plotting to use holographic cloaking brooches at a modeling show to steal important data, and she sends SparkMan to distract Lan while she does so. However, Chaud appears and stops her plan, but faces ProtoMan, who admits that he is now a Darkloid working with Nebula.
29	29	"Enzan VS Blues" / "Chaud VS ProtoMan"; Transliteration: "Enzan VS Burūsu" (Japanese: 炎山VSブルース)	Son Seung-hee	Naoko Marukawa	April 24, 2004	July 23, 2005
Chaud is having trouble dealing with the loss of ProtoMan to darkness, but Lan helps comfort him with his loss. Later, when GravityMan and ProtoMan attack, Chaud is forced to fight against his own NetNavi to protect important NetSaver data while Lan handles GravityMan.
30	30	"Lovey-Dovey Aquaman" / "SpoutMan's New Hero!"; Transliteration: "Raburabu Akuaman" (Japanese: ラブラブアクアマン)	Naoyoshi Kusaka	Katsuhiko Chiba	May 1, 2004	Aired only in Canada (Later bundled in 2023)
When MegaMan rescues SpoutMan from a Darkloid attack, SpoutMan begins idolizing his new hero and following him everywhere, causing Roll to grow jealous. Meanwhile, BurnerMan attacks, and MegaMan must fight, but SpoutMan and Roll get in the way. In the end, BurnerMan is deleted when MegaMan uses SpoutSoul against the Darkloid.
31	31	"Object Junkman from the Satellite" / "Space Junk!"; Transliteration: "Eisei kara no buttai Jankuman" (Japanese: 衛星からの物体J（ｼﾞｬﾝｸﾏﾝ）)	Naoyoshi Kusaka	Masaharu Amiya	May 8, 2004	July 30, 2005
Yai needs her friends' help again. An AyanoTech satellite has been covered in space debris, so Lan and co. board a space station built from junk to solve the problem. In the station's network, MegaMan meets JunkDataMan, the NetNavi responsible for the mess, and a misunderstanding leads to a battle between the two.
32	32	"Revival! Commander Beef" / "Commander Beef Returns!"; Transliteration: "Fukkatsu! Bīfu shirei" (Japanese: 復活！ビーフ司令)	Osamu Inoue	Mayori Sekijima	May 15, 2004	September 3, 2005
The NetAgents have returned to DenTech City, and Lan is shocked to learn that everyone already knew their identities were Sal, Miyu, and Maysa. Mr. Gauss also returns to town to make a deal with Ms. Yuri, but mistakening Ms. Mari for her, he holds her hostage. Commander Beef dashes to rescue his love from danger.
33	33	"Cross Fusion #0" / "The BattleChip Gate"; Transliteration: "Kurosu fyūjon Zero-gō" (Japanese: クロスフュージョン0号)	Son Seung-hee	Kenichi Araki	May 22, 2004	August 6, 2005
Lan meets Misaki, the first person to test CrossFusion. Misaki uses his NetNavi PrismMan to help in the capture of GravityMan. However, Misaki is overcome with his desire to CrossFuse, and Ms. Yuri uses his desires to lure him toward a trap. Meanwhile, Chaud assists Lan with the Battle Chip Gate to delete GravityMan using the Program Advance.
34	34	"Wanted: PrismMan"; Transliteration: "Shimeitehai wa Purizuman" (Japanese: 指名手配はプリズマン)	Tsuyoshi Nagasawa	Kenichi Araki	May 29, 2004	August 13, 2005
Misaki uses the power of a Dark SynchroChip to CrossFuse, but as a side-effect, his human heart is enriched with darkness. Captured by the NetSavers, they begin to heal him, but Ms. Yuri reinstitutes his darkness, causing him to escape. Lan battles with Misaki in CrossFusion, but the battle causes Lan's PET to be badly damaged.
35	35	"Nebula's Great Invasion!"; Transliteration: "Nebyura daishinkō!" (Japanese: ネビュラ大侵攻！)	Naoyoshi Kusaka	Kenichi Yamada	June 5, 2004	August 20, 2005
Lan must use his own body in order to help rebuild MegaMan after his PET is damaged beyond repair. Meanwhile, Nebula sends NovaMan, BrightMan, SwordMan, and FridgeMan to attack various locations. In Lan's absence, Raika works with old friend Raoul to stop the invasion. BrightMan is deleted, and the others retreat.
36	36	"Completion! New Style PET!" / "The New PET"; Transliteration: "Kansei! Shingata PET!" (Japanese: 完成！ 新型PET！)	Atsushi Ōtsuki	Masashi Kubota	June 12, 2004	August 27, 2005
Dr. Hikari finishes Lan's new PET, the PET II, which amplifies CrossFusion abilities, but the installation isn't completed. However, Dark ProtoMan infiltrates the Sci-Labs to destroy the PET (with MegaMan inside). Anetta takes the PET and Dark ProtoMan gives chase with Chaud close behind to rescue her. Chaud and Anetta work together to capture Dark ProtoMan, but NovaMan appears to finish the job. The installation in PET II is finally completed. Lan appears and, using the PET II, easily deletes NovaMan.
37	37	"Mysterious Masked Navi"; Transliteration: "Nazo no fukumen Nabi" (Japanese: 謎の覆面ナビ)	Shigeru Ueda	Katsuhiko Chiba	June 19, 2004	November 28, 2005
Lan becomes arrogant with his new PET II's powers, so Chaud and Raoul pose as afro wig-wearing villains to teach Lan a lesson. However, SwordMan appears to cause problems, and he overcomes ThunderMan in battle. MegaMan uses ThunderSoul to stop SwordMan.
38	-	"Flying to Shiisaa Island"; Transliteration: "Tonde Shīsā Airando" (Japanese: 飛んでシーサーアイランド)	Osamu Inoue	Naoko Marukawa	June 26, 2004	Not aired in English
Lan and his friends' NetNavis disappear in a tornado of wind, and they track them to Shiisaa Island. There, they meet Lily and her NetNavi WindBlastMan. Ms. Yuri also appears on the island, hoping to steal the data within an ancient relic. When SpikeMan disrupts the relic, a huge storm brews over the island, and using WindSoul MegaMan defeats Spikeman.
39	-	"Go to Hell by Train?!"; Transliteration: "Ressha de GO to hell!?" (Japanese: 列車でGO to hell！？)	Naoyoshi Kusaka	Masaharu Amiya	July 3, 2004	Not aired in English
Lan and Chisao are leaving a theme park on a train when SparkMan attacks the train's network. Sal has been tailing the NetNavi and sends WoodMan in to help with MegaMan. In order to delete SparkMan, MegaMan and WoodMan combine their powers to create WoodSoul.
40	38	"Hero of the Earth's Bowels" / "Underground Hero"; Transliteration: "Chi no soko no eiyū" (Japanese: 地の底の英雄)	Daisuke Tsukushi	Mayori Sekijima	July 10, 2004	November 29, 2005
A Dimensional Area has appeared over a factory in Sharo, so Raika calls for Lan to help infiltrate it against his general's orders. Inside, they meet FridgeMan who is trying to steal minerals. Upon his defeat, Lan learns that Raika was mostly trying to rescue his pet dog that was trapped in the factory.
41	39	"Allegro"; Transliteration: "Areguro" (Japanese: アレグロ)	Son Seung-hee	Kenichi Araki	July 17, 2004	November 30, 2005
While Lan is away in Sharo, Chaud and Maylu work together to investigate the disappearance of NetNavis who participated in the N1 Grand Prix last year. They meet a robot named Allegro and also re-encounter Kid Grave, now being controlled by Bass. After causing so much trouble, Bass gets rid of Allegro by destroying his CPU, and rejects an offer by Dark ProtoMan to join Nebula.
42	-	"Maylu's First Date"; Transliteration: "Meiru no hatsu dēto" (Japanese: メイルの初デート)	Naoyoshi Kusaka	Masashi Kubota	July 24, 2004	Not aired in English
After having a dream about performing CrossFusion, Maylu wishes to do so and protect Lan for a change. While on a date together at an amusement park, SwordMan attacks and Lan drops his SynchroChip. Maylu picks it up, determined to CrossFuse, but she fails. In the end, Lan saves her again, but their relationship has grown.
43	-	"Top and Grandchild"; Transliteration: "Koma to Mago" (Japanese: コマとマゴ)	Yukio Suzuki	Masaharu Amiya	July 31, 2004	Not aired in English
An elderly man named Tensuke wishes to better connect with his grandson who cares more about NetBattling, not Tensuke's love for tops. Lan and Maylu decide to help Tensuke perfect his NetBattling skills with NetNavi TopMan.
44	40	"Fear of Summer Vacation" / "MistMan's Tower"; Transliteration: "Natsuyasumi no kyōfu" (Japanese: 夏休みの恐怖)	Tsuyoshi Nagasawa	Katsuhiko Chiba	August 7, 2004	December 1, 2005
While on summer vacation, Lan and Maylu search around the world for a beetle and find themselves in ancient desert ruins. There, they find a magic lamp that summons MistMan, a NetNavi genie, but Ms. Yuri, SwordMan, and FridgeMan also seek the power of MistMan. In the end, MistMan is freed and helps MegaMan in deleting both SwordMan and FridgeMan.
45	-	"Rush Runs Away"; Transliteration: "Rasshu no iede" (Japanese: ラッシュの家出)	Naoyoshi Kusaka	Kenichi Yamada	August 14, 2004	Not aired in English
When Maylu receives a new kitten, Rush feels neglected and runs away on the internet. He befriends a Maloko sheep virus, but BubbleMan is causing electrical interference throughout the city in hopes of reviving ShadeMan. Rush and the Maloko intervene.
46	41	"The Great NetPolice Battle!"; Transliteration: "Netto keisatsu daikōbōsen!" (Japanese: ネット警察大攻防戦！)	Daisuke Tsukushi	Masashi Kubota	August 21, 2004	December 2, 2005
Using Control X, the NetSavers plan to locate Dr. Regal's hidden space hideout. But to stop their plan, Nebula sends an army of previously-deleted Darkloids after the program. MegaMan, SearchMan, and the NetPolice re-delete the Darkloids while Dark ProtoMan goes straight for the program that Chaud and Anetta are working with. Meanwhile, Bass appears and revives ShadeMan.
47	42	"A Message from Outer Space" / "Get Dr. Regal!"; Transliteration: "Uchiu kara no messēji" (Japanese: 宇宙からのメッセージ)	Shigeru Ueda; Son Seung-hee	Masaharu Amiya	August 28, 2004	December 5, 2005
With the help of Yai and his friends, Lan blasts off to space to stop Dr. Regal against the NetSavers' orders. JunkDataMan also reappears to help the kids by giving MegaMan JunkDataSoul to clear the space of junk. When Lan reaches the station, he's instead confronted by Dark ProtoMan, and after the battle, the space station sends on a crash-course to Earth. However, JunkDataMan is able to rescue the children at the last moment.
48	43	"Mariko and Yuriko" / "Ms. Yuri's Mission"; Transliteration: "Mariko to Yuriko" (Japanese: まりことゆりこ)	Shin Katagai	Kenichi Araki	September 4, 2004	December 6, 2005
When Ms. Mari witnesses the apparent death of Ms. Yuri, she reveals the truth about her twin sister that she was separated from at a young age. However, Ms. Yuri returns to life and is ordered to kill her sister. She takes Misaki hostage and reveals that she's a superhuman descendant of Duo, an intergalactic force that will soon arrive on Earth. Lan and the kids intervene and try to stop Ms. Yuri who uses a Dark SynchroChip to fight, but she is swayed against Nebula. In the end, Dark ProtoMan appears and strikes, presumably killing both Ms. Yuri and Misaki.
49	44	"Farewell Blues" / "ProtoMan Returns"; Transliteration: "Saraba Burūsu" (Japanese: さらば ブルース)	Osamu Inoue	Mayori Sekijima	September 11, 2004	December 7, 2005
The NetSavers and Lan's friends have devised a plan to bring ProtoMan back from the darkness with a VaccineChip. Luring him into a trap at a deserted hotel, the plan is put into motion, but the chip fails. Chaud performs CrossFusion with Dark ProtoMan to try and cure him, sending the two into a world of memories where they battle with the darkness. The darkness is eventually alleviated, but Chaud and ProtoMan are both hospitalized after the battle.
50	45	"Dark VS Dark"; Transliteration: "Dāku tai dāku no kessen" (Japanese: ダーク対ダークの決戦)	Naoyoshi Kusaka	Katsuhiko Chiba	September 18, 2004	December 8, 2005
Revived, ShadeMan plans to get revenge on Dr. Regal. First, he captures Rush and uses his technology to appear in the real world without the aid of a Dimensional Area. He goes on a rampage through DenTech City to find Dr. Regal, but Lan intervenes. However, once Dr. Regal appears, he unveils a tower of Dimensional Area Converters and covers the entire planet.
51	46	"Where the Light Reaches" / "Dr. Regal's Rampage"; Transliteration: "Hikari todoku basho" (Japanese: 光とどく場所)	Tsuyoshi Nagasawa	Kenichi Araki	September 25, 2004	December 9, 2005
Dr. Regal uses a Dark SynchroChip to fuse with his NetNavi, LaserMan, and then proceeds to rip ShadeMan to shreds. Then, giant-sized LaserMen begin attacking cities throughout the world. Lan uses DoubleSoul during CrossFusion to fight Regal, but it zaps his power. CrossFusion ProtoMan reappears to help fight, but Regal proceeds to attack the Sci-Labs. However, the pleas of the NetNavis' souls (powering the Dimensional Area Converters) revives Lan and he achieves FullSynchro, completely destroying Dr. Regal. With peace restored, everyone watches a night sky of shooting stars, including Ms. Yuri who claims "As one chapter ends, another one begins."
