= Kumiko Higa =

Japanese voice actress

- 比嘉久美子
- Born: Osaka, Japan
- Occupation: Voice actress
- Years active: 2000–present

Kumiko Higa (比嘉久美子, Higa Kumiko) is a Japanese voice actress. She is part of 81 Produce. Kumiko is famous for her role in the Rockman.EXE series as Netto Hikari and Thomas in Thomas & Friends when she succeeded Keiko Toda.

== Filmography ==
=== Anime ===
- Best Student Council (TV) as Sachiko Iijima (ep 4)
- Bokurano (TV) as Maki Ano
- D.Gray-man (TV) as Daisya Barry (Youth) (ep 37)
- Futakoi (TV) as Young Yuuya (ep 6)
- Geneshaft (TV) as Mika Seidou
- Gintama (TV) as Haji (eps 84-85)
- Cardfight!! Vanguard as Eiji Saga
- Haibane Renmei (TV) as Dai
- Hamtaro as Marron
- Jagainu-kun (TV) as Satoinu (Boartato)
- Kyo kara Maoh! (TV) as Raven (young)
- Machine Robo Rescue (TV) as Shou Ashigawa; Haruka Suzusaki
- MÄR (TV) as Ginta Toramizu (eps 90-102); Burube (eps 15-16)
- Mirmo! (TV) as Etsumi; Peter
- My-Otome (TV) as Irina Woods
- My-Otome Zwei (OAV) as Irina Woods
- Nanami-chan (TV) as Kemario; Student
- Nodame Cantabile (TV) as Makiko Tanaka
- PaRappa the Rapper (TV) as Ghost/Monster (ep 12)
- Pocket Monsters Advanced Generation the Movie: Deoxys the Visitor (movie) as Minun
- Pocket Monsters: Advanced Generation (TV) as Minun (eps 38, 52)
- Rockman.EXE (TV) as Netto Hikari
- Rockman.EXE Axess (TV) as Netto Hikari
- Rockman.EXE Stream (TV) as Netto Hikari
- Rockman.EXE: Hikari to Yami no Program (movie) as Netto Hikari
- Rockman.EXE Beast (TV) as Netto Hikari
- Rockman.EXE Beast+ (TV) as Netto Hikari
- Sky Girls (TV) as Ranko Mikogami
- Spider Riders (TV) as Prince Lumen; Portia
- Spider Riders: Yomigaeru Taiyou (TV) as Prince Lumen; Portia; [+ unlisted credits]
- Tactical Roar (TV) as Manatsu Akoya
- Tantei Shounen Kageman (TV) as Mario
- Tsubasa: Reservoir Chronicle (TV) as Nokoru; Secret Agents (ep 9)
- Uta Kata (TV) as Eri (ep 3)
- Zoids/ZERO (TV) as Kelly Tasker
- Pandora Hearts as Phillipe

=== Games ===
- Wild Arms XF as Weishelt
- Mega Man Network Transmission as Lan Hikari
- Saru! Get You! SaruSaru Big Mission as Hikaru

=== Tokusatsu ===
- Mahou Sentai Magiranger as Mandora Boy

=== Dubbing ===
- Future-Worm! as Danny Douglas
- Jim Henson's Construction Site as Scooch and SKatch
- Thomas the Tank Engine and Friends as Thomas the Tank Engine (Succeeding Keiko Toda: Calling All Engines – twenty-fourth series)
