= Babamania =

Japanese alternative rock group

- Origin: Japan
- Genres: Alternative rock
- Years active: 1992–2008, 2011–present
- Labels: Imperial Records
- Members: Genki; Mari; Yujin; Takeo; Daigo

Babamania is a Japanese alternative rock group best known for their 2003 hit "Wanna Rock," which is known internationally due to its inclusion on the multi-platform video game FIFA Football 2004. They are also known for their track "Doobee Doowop Communication" which was played at the end of the anime Rockman EXE Stream.

Although they formed in 1992, Babamania didn't release any material until 1999 when female vocalist Mari joined. They have since released eight albums and a 'best of' compilation called Bababest.

== Band Members ==
- Genki – vocals (1992–2008, 2011–present)
- Mari – vocals (1997–2008, 2011–present)
- Yujin – guitars (1992–2008, 2011–present)
- Takeo – bass (1994–2002, 2011–present)
- Daigo – drums (1992–2006, 2011–present)

== Discography ==
=== Albums ===
- Babamania (EP) (2000)
- Pau Hana (EP) (200)
- Diskord (2000)
- Just Come Up (2001)
- Pornmuzik (2001)
- I.D. (2002)
- Ilnana (2003)
- Jungle Livin' (2003)
- Great Grand Bag Of Magic Tricks (2005)
- Bababest (2005)
- Zero Gravity Disco (2006)

=== Singles ===
- "A Man of Tearz" (2000)
- "Take It" (2001)
- "Wanna Rock" (2003)
- "Doobee Doowop Communication" (2003)
- "Nobody's Girl" (2004)
- "Sunrise" (2005)
