= Ryo Takamisaki =

Japanese manga artist (born 1963)

Ryo Takamisaki 鷹岬 諒
- Born: August 14, 1963 (age 63) Tsuchiura, Japan
- Area: Manga artist
- Notable works: MegaMan NT Warrior

Ryo Takamisaki (鷹岬 諒, Takamisaki Ryō; born August 14, 1963) is a Japanese manga artist from Tsuchiura, Ibaraki Prefecture who is known for his work on the manga series MegaMan NT Warrior. He is a graduate of Ibaraki Prefectural Tsuchiura First High School and Nagoya University.

== Works ==
- Charger 500
- Godzilla X Megaguirus: The G Elimination Project War
- Kaze no Eldorado
- The King of Fighters G (1996, Shinseisha)
- MegaMan NT Warrior (2001, Shogakukan)
- Mega Man Star Force (2008, Shogakukan)
- The rise of Darkrai (2008, Shogakukan)
- Kamen Rider Fourze (2012, Shogakukan)
- Mobile Suit Gundam AGE ~Climax Hero~ (2012)
- Pokémon the Movie: I Choose You! (2018, Shogakukan)
- Mega Man 11 (2018, Shogakukan)
