= List of MegaMan NT Warrior episodes (Stream) =

This article covers the third series of the MegaMan NT Warrior anime series, known in Japan as Rockman EXE Stream (ロックマンエグゼストリーム, Rokkuman Eguze Sutorīmu). Like Axess, Stream consists of only one part with 51 episodes. Currently, there are no plans for an English adaptation of the series, but they did reuse some background elements in MegaMan Star Force.

Stream premiered in Japan on October 2, 2004, exactly one week after Axess concluded. It ran until September 24, 2005. Midway through the series, the 50-minute feature film Rockman EXE: Program of Light and Dark premiered in Japanese theaters on March 12, 2005. The movie would directly connect with the events in Stream and is necessary for understanding the full plot of the series.

The title Stream is meant to describe the flow of one storyline into the next, and this holds true as Stream picks up immediately where Axess left off. In relation to the Mega Man Battle Network video games, Stream uses many prominent characters and concepts from Battle Network 5, though it still borrows elements from various previous Battle Network titles, especially Battle Network 4.

== Episode list ==
No.	Title	Directed by	Written by	Original release date
1	"Duo"; Transliteration: "Dyūo" (Japanese: デューオ)	Shin Katagai	Kenichi Araki	October 2, 2004
The NetSavers are in investigation with the Sci-Lab over the strange comet that has appeared in Earth's atmosphere. Soon, strange activity begins occurring when giant-sized Mettaur viruses begin terrorizing DenTech City. Lan and Chaud manage to defeat them, but MegaMan finds himself captured by none-other-than Bass. He tells MegaMan that he is after his "Ultimate Program" so he can fight off Duo. As Lan and Chaud rush to his rescue, they encounter an old rival, Dr. Wily, who seems to know what's going on.
2	"Earth Erasure"; Transliteration: "Chikyū massatsu" (Japanese: 地球抹殺)	Daisuke Tsukushi	Kenichi Araki	October 9, 2004
ProtoMan arrives to help ward off Bass, but more giant-sized viruses continue appearing in the real world. Lan and Chaud prepare to send their NetNavis to the comet, but Bass intervenes in hopes of overcoming the power that threatens Earth himself. Bass meets Slur who swiftly defeats him. Slur is a subordinate of Duo, an intergalactic force threatening to erase Earth after Dr. Regal's activity with darkness. However, Lan and Chaud convince him to spare their planet, and Duo challenges them to prove humankind's worth. After the incident, Lan receives a marking on the palm of his hand, the Crest of Duo.
3	"Threat of the Asteroid"; Transliteration: "Asuteroido no kyōi" (Japanese: アステロイドの脅威)	Naoyoshi Kusaka	Mayori Sekijima	October 16, 2004
BlazeQuest releases new PET models called Progress PETs. Meanwhile, while shooting a commercial for BlazeQuest, Lan meets Inukai, a zookeeper who is abusive to the animals. When Inukai gets in trouble, his frustration attracts Slur, and he is given Asteroid SavageMan to get revenge. Asteroid NetNavis are able to appear in the real world without Dimensional Areas, causing problems with Lan and Chaud, but Dr. Wily helps in the production of a Dimensional Area Generator, allowing the Sci-Labs to create them on command.
4	"Salad Memorial Day?!"; Transliteration: "Sarada kinenbi!?" (Japanese: サラダ記念日！？)	Son Seung-hee	Masaharu Amiya	October 23, 2004
Mameo, a boy attending Lan's school, hates vegetables. Slur targets him and gives him Asteroid VineMan who can help destroy all of the vegetables in the world. This enrages Lan since vegetables are a prominent ingredient in curry, so Lan and Chaud track Mameo down. However, VineMan turns on Mameo, so Lan and Chaud must rescue him from his own NetNavi.
5	"Flying Pick-Up Artist!"; Transliteration: "Soratobu nanpa yarō!" (Japanese: 空飛ぶナンパ野郎！)	Osamu Inoue	Kenichi Yamada	October 30, 2004
While investigating a NetSaver case, Lan notices helicopter pilot Charlie Airstar at the scene of the crimes. Lan presumes Charlie is the culprit, but Charlie is really tracking the true criminal on his own: director of DNN network, Sunayama (and even has the nerve of pursuing Sunayama to Lan's school). Sunayama uses Asteroid DesertMan to fight back, but MegaMan and ProtoMan team up with Charlie's GyroMan to stop him.
6	"Stone Panic!"; Transliteration: "Sutōn panikku!" (Japanese: ストーンパニック！)	Naoyoshi Kusaka	Masashi Kubota	November 6, 2004
Clumsy Yui receives Asteroid StoneMan who gives her the power to turn anything she touches into stone. Panicking, Yui soon transforms the entire business complex and everyone inside into statues. Lan, who is returning an item Yui lost, encounters the problem and battles with StoneMan through Cross Fusion, as Yui had panicked and slotted the Dimensional Chip in.
7	"Navi Car Race!"; Transliteration: "Nabi kā rēsu!" (Japanese: ナビカーレース！)	Atsushi Ōtsuki	Katsuhiko Chiba	November 13, 2004
Lan and Chaud represent BlazeQuest in a car race where NetNavis operate racecars in the real world and get into some comical arguments in the progress. Another participant, Rei Saiko, has mysteriously moved up in the tournament thanks to Rei's new NetNavi, Asteroid FlashMan, who has been cheating in the races. MegaMan and ProtoMan catch FlashMan in the act and are forced to battle with him by Cross Fusing, but Rei escapes before he can be arrested.
8	"Calling on Colonel!"; Transliteration: "Kāneru sanjō!" (Japanese: カーネル参上！)	Shin Katagai	Kenichi Araki	November 20, 2004
Lan and Chaud are led to Netopia to investigate a strange virus disturbance near a research center. There, strange holographic visions of the past appear, and viruses previously believed to be extinct attack in the real world. MegaMan and ProtoMan are also attacked, but they're rescued by a NetNavi named Colonel. After the incident, Chaud receives the Crest of Duo, and he decides to continue investigation in Netopia while Lan returns home.
9	"Revival! Neo WWW"; Transliteration: "Fukkatsu! Neo wārudo surī" (Japanese: 復活！ ネオWWW)	Naoyoshi Kusaka	Mayori Sekijima	November 27, 2004
Mr. Gauss's daughter Tesla announces the formation of a new net-crime syndicate called Neo WWW, and their first mission is to rescue the imprisoned Mr. Gauss. Lan and the NetSavers attempt to intervene, but with the aid of Inukai, Rei, and Sunayama who have all joined Tesla, Mr. Gauss is rescued and Tesla becomes the new operator of MagnetMan.
10	"Rhapsody in Pink"; Transliteration: "Rapusodi in pinku" (Japanese: ラプソディ イン ピンク)	Daisuke Tsukushi	Naoko Marukawa	December 4, 2004
When film writer Viddy Narcy becomes enraged over the criticism of his latest work, Slur gives him Asteroid VideoMan. With VideoMan's help, Viddy begins painting the city in pink, including part of Lan's face. Lan teams up with Charlie to track Viddy down, and by forming GyroSoul with GyroMan, VideoMan is defeated. But as Viddy escapes, he encounters Sunayama who offers him a position in Neo WWW.
11	"Concrete Jungle"; Transliteration: "Konkurīto janguru" (Japanese: コンクリートジャングル)	Naoyoshi Kusaka	Masaharu Amiya	December 11, 2004
Inukai begins an attack by transforming automobiles throughout DenTech City into wild animals. Lan and Famous investigate the situation and MegaMan goes to battle with SavageMan but encounters all four Neo WWW NetNavis at once. Colonel reappears and rescues MegaMan in the end.
12	"Jawaii Curry and Tomahawk"; Transliteration: "Jawai karē to Tomahōku" (Japanese: ジャワイカレーとトマホーク)	Osamu Inoue	Kenichi Yamada	December 18, 2004
While visiting Dex in Jawaii, Lan meets Dingo, a fellow lover of curry. The two become quick rivals and Lan challenges him to a NetBattle with TomahawkMan. Meanwhile, Viddy plans to bury the entire island in a giant wave of curry sauce, so Lan and Dingo infiltrate his giant fish airship to stop him with some help from Dex, who Viddy kidnapped to make the curry sauce.
13	"Jasmine"; Transliteration: "Jasumin" (Japanese: ジャスミン)	Tsuyoshi Nagasawa	Masashi Kubota	December 25, 2004
Lan meets a girl named Jasmine from the country of Choina. To complete her training as a pharmacist, Jasmine seeks a rare flower, and Lan agrees to help her. However, a man named Bengel in a medicine company hopes to steal the medicine that Jasmine is concocting, so he kidnaps Jasmine and threatens to delete her NetNavi Meddy if she doesn't give up her secrets. Lan and MegaMan manage to rescue the two from the perilous situation.
14	"Bubble GoGoGo!"; Transliteration: "Baburu GoGoGo!" (Japanese: バブルGoGoGo！)	Naoyoshi Kusaka	Katsuhiko Chiba	January 8, 2005
BubbleMan returns, and this time, he seeks a rare treasure hidden in the depths of the internet. He joins up with IceMan and SpoutMan to undergo this mission, but MegaMan and Roll are close behind to keep the young NetNavis out of trouble. MagnetMan also tails the group, hoping to snag the treasure for himself.
15	"Icy Invention... you say?!" Transliteration: "Kōri no hatsumei... de kofu!?" (Japanese: 氷の発明･･･でコフ！？)	Yasunori Urata	Masaharu Amiya	January 15, 2005
Chaud teams up with Raoul and ThunderMan to investigate missing NetNavis in Netopia. They track the crime down to Ivan Chilliski who was given Asteroid FridgeMan to undergo such crimes. Chaud and Raoul dupe him into revealing himself by posing as the afro-wig villains from Axess, and Chaud uses CrossFusion to battle with FridgeMan.
16	"Gravity Diet of Terror!"; Transliteration: "Kyōfu no gurabiti daietto!" (Japanese: 恐怖の重力ダイエット！)	Naoyoshi Kusaka	Mayori Sekijima	January 22, 2005
Mac and Harry, two criminals Manuela is pursuing, receive Asteroid GravityMan, and to get revenge on Manuela, they use him to shift gravity and make Manuela believe she is putting on weight. As a result, Manuela is overcome with the need to diet and exercise. However, Mac and Harry unintentionally appear in a submarine with the NetSavers during a virus examination, and they lose control of their NetNavi. Raika rejoins the cast at the end.
17	"Dark Chip Again"; Transliteration: "Dāku chippu futatabi" (Japanese: ダークチップ再び)	Daisuke Tsukushi	Kenichi Yamada	January 29, 2005
DarkChips have begun spreading through DenTech City again, so Lan begins an investigation in a factory to catch the culprits distributing the chips. He encounters Inukai and Rei who overcome him in battle. However, Raika reappears, now using CrossFusion to overcome the Neo WWW members.
18	"Sword and Samurai"; Transliteration: "Tsurugi to samurai" (Japanese: 剣とサムライ)	Naoyoshi Kusaka	Naoko Marukawa	February 5, 2005
Lan and Raika investigate the disappearance of ancient weapons being stolen from museums, and Raika suspects that his old friend Iriya may be operating Asteroid JapanMan who is responsible for the crimes. However, Iriya may be innocent when he tries to protect Raika from JapanMan. Lan and Raika delete JapanMan and bring Iriya back to his senses. Before returning home to Sharo, Raika receives the Crest of Duo.
19	"The Explosion that Carries Happiness"; Transliteration: "Shiawase o hakobu bakuhatsu" (Japanese: 幸せを運ぶ爆発)	Naoyoshi Kusaka	Masashi Kubota	February 12, 2005
Asteroid MoltanicMan was given to a criminal, but after an incident, a war-torn MoltanicMan drifts through the internet and finds himself in the PET of young fireworks-maker Fyrefox. Fyrefox is delighted to have a NetNavi after the loss of his own, and Fyrefox's friendship gradually sways MoltanicMan away from evil. However, MoltanicMan's original NetOp reappears, unwilling to give up his partner in crime to Fyrefox.
20	"Stormy Vacation"; Transliteration: "Arashi no bakansu" (Japanese: 嵐のバカンス)	Osamu Inoue	Katsuhiko Chiba	February 19, 2005
Lan and Dr. Hikari visit Taneka Island to help with the launch of a satellite. Meanwhile, Tesla is also visiting the island, planning to hijack the satellite. Before her attack, she encounters Charlie who quickly falls for her, and the two develop a flirtatious relationship. However, when Charlie discovers that the girl is really Tesla of Neo WWW, he rushes to the satellite to stop her attack.
21	"Dr. Wily's Daughter"; Transliteration: "Dokutā Wairī no musume" (Japanese: ドクターワイリーの娘)	Yasunori Urata	Kenichi Araki	February 26, 2005
Misaki finally awakens after the coma Dark ProtoMan put him into at Axess's conclusion, but he's discerned to learn that Ms. Yuri was never found. Meanwhile, Colonel faces Slur but is horribly damaged, so he's taken in to the Sci-Labs to recover. Before he can be questioned, he vanishes again. Back at the hospital, Asteroid BlasterMan attacks, and Misaki uses PrismMan to confront him. When cornered, Misaki is rescued than none-other-than Ms. Yuri who uses CrossFusion to defeat BlasterMan.
22	"Dekao, Curry Transformation"; Transliteration: "Dekao, karē naru henshin" (Japanese: デカオ、カレーなる転身)	Naoyoshi Kusaka	Masaharu Amiya	March 5, 2005
Dex has returned to DenTech City and, giving up his dreams of being the strongest NetBattler, has now embraced a life as a curry chef. Dingo also moves to DenTech to work for the original WWW's curry shop. Meanwhile, Sunayama and DesertMan work together in their latest scheme, but Yahoot, Dex, and Dingo work together to stop him.
23	"Ni Hao! Net Hermit"; Transliteration: "Nīhao! Netto sennin" (Japanese: ニーハオ！ネット仙人)	Tsuyoshi Nagasawa	Mayori Sekijima	March 12, 2005
Lan and Dex travel to Choina in hopes of finding a medicine for an ill panda bear in DenTech's zoo. There, they meet Cardamom, the grandfather of Jasmine. Meanwhile, many people in Choina wish to steal Cardamom's medicinal secrets, so Lan and Dex team up with Jasmine to help stop such a villain.
24	"Narcy's Retirement"; Transliteration: "Narushī dattai" (Japanese: ナルシー脱退)	Naoyoshi Kusaka	Masashi Kubota	March 19, 2005
Yai holds a NetNavi design contest, and Viddy is so thrilled to participate that he quits his job with Neo WWW. However, upon winning the contest, Viddy is disqualified because the contest is restricted to children. Enraged, Viddy begins transforming AyanoTech's game characters into rabbits, but Lan and MegaMan intervene to stop Viddy's rampage. Viddy returns to his life at Neo WWW.
25	"Terrible Birthday Present"; Transliteration: "Senritsu no bāsudē purezento" (Japanese: 戦慄のバースディプレゼント)	Naoyoshi Kusaka	Mayori Sekijima	March 26, 2005
It's Tesla's birthday, and she desires more than anything her own SynchroChip. Through a series of crimes, the Neo WWW is able to retrieve her one, and she uses it to overcome Lan in battle. In the end, he is rescued by Ms. Yuri, but not before she has a special reunion with her twin sister Ms. Mari.
26	"Icy Asteroid Castle"; Transliteration: "Koori no asuteroido-jō" (Japanese: 氷のアステロイド城)	Yasunori Urata	Kenichi Araki	April 2, 2005
Sharo and Brightland cooperate in the production of a CrossFusion Research Institute, but Asteroid AirMan is sent to destroy it. Raika and Princess Pride work together to stop him, and they're chased to an abandoned castle amidst an ice storm where more secrets to this attack are unveiled. Raika ultimately defeats AirMan, and Pride receives her own Crest of Duo.
27	"Route's Close Call!"; Transliteration: "Rūto-san Kiki ippatsu!" (Japanese: ルートさん危機一髪！)	Naoyoshi Kusaka	Masaharu Amiya	April 9, 2005
Lan meets Route, a guide program at an automobiles museum. Meanwhile, criminal Ken has to steal cars in order to rescue his girlfriend from a mob leader, and he is given Asteroid BrightMan to do so. Lan intervenes but is overpowered by BrightMan, so Route sacrifices herself in order to help defeat the Asteroid. However, Route is revived from back-up data, and peace is temporarily restored.
28	"Pink Punch Maylu"; Transliteration: "Pinku panchi Meiru" (Japanese: ピンクパンチメイル)	Naoyoshi Kusaka	Katsuhiko Chiba	April 16, 2005
Lan becomes tired from constantly battling the Neo WWW, so Dex decides he wants to perform CrossFusion and help in the battle. He confronts Famous who uses Rush to create the Rush SynchroChip to help make it possible. Dex and Maylu accompany Lan to a dinosaur theme park where Viddy strikes, but Lan is too tired to battle. Dex attempts CrossFusion and fails, so in order to save the day, Maylu tries it. Surprisingly, she CrossFuses flawlessly and helps Lan defeat Viddy.
29	"The Safecracking Man"; Transliteration: "Kinkoyaburi no otoko" (Japanese: 金庫破りの男)	Osamu Inoue	Naoko Marukawa	April 23, 2005
An investigation by Chaud in Netopia against a man named Rat leads to some shocking discoveries. A man named Jackass used the same crime tactics that Rat did, but his attacks were decades in the past, and Colonel was responsible for stopping him. Considering Colonel still exists in the present time, Chaud contemplates the true nature of his character. Chaud and Raoul ultimately capture Rat and defeat his Asteroid DrillMan, but not before his plan was put into motion, causing locks all over the world to suddenly unlock.
30	"Tesla - A Complicated Girl's Mind"; Transliteration: "Tesla fukuzatsu na otomegokoro" (Japanese: テスラ・複雑な乙女心)	Naoyoshi Kusaka	Masashi Kubota	April 30, 2005
When a newspaper prints Tesla's age as thirty, she becomes enraged. During a robot battle convention, she hijacks a robot named Thirty and attacks the NetPolice. After a malfunction, the robot goes speeding after Lan and Fyrefox through DenTech City. Lan CrossFuses to battle with Tesla while Fyrefox sends MoltanicMan inside Thirty to prevent it from self-destructing.
31	"Shademan's Counterattack"; Transliteration: "Shēdoman Gyakushū" (Japanese: シェードマン逆襲)	Tsuyoshi Nagasawa	Kenichi Araki	May 7, 2005
Through Chaud's research, he knows more information regarding Colonel and his NetOp Baryl. Meanwhile, a shift in time and space revives ShadeMan moments before LaserMan deleted him in Axess. He fights with Lan and Chaud, and Ms. Yuri helps, revealing that she, too, has a Crest of Duo. ShadeMan reunites with BubbleMan and begins their latest scheme to travel twenty years into the past, before the network was created, and overrun the world with Darkloids. MegaMan attempts to stop him but fails, receiving a painful bite on the neck as he falls.
32	"Space-Time Battle"; Transliteration: "Jikū sensō" (Japanese: 時空戦争)	Naoyoshi Kusaka	Kenichi Araki	May 14, 2005
MegaMan dives into the space-time tunnel and follows ShadeMan twenty years into the past. There, he encounters Colonel and teams up with him to save the future. However, the bite left by ShadeMan on MegaMan's neck infuses him with evil energy, transforming his soul into darkness (and almost Darkloidifying him). Lan rushes to connect with MegaMan again, hoping to install a VaccineChip and recover him. He does so just as ShadeMan is deleted, and MegaMan manages to stop his plan, returning the present time back to normal. As MegaMan returns to his time, the dark energy separates from his body and vanishes.
33	"Oath of the Tomahawk"; Transliteration: "Tomahōku no chikai" (Japanese: トマホークの誓い)	Naoyoshi Kusaka	Kenichi Yamada	May 21, 2005
Shanka, a girl from Dingo's tribe, requests to return a stolen totem pole back to her village when it's discovered in a museum. However, Viddy and Inukai steal the totem pole along with other rare items, so Lan, Dingo, and Shanka work together to recover the ancient relics. In the end, Dingo receives the Crest of Duo.
34	"Wish Upon a Star..."; Transliteration: "Hoshi ni negai o..." (Japanese: 星に願いを…)	Yasunori Urata	Masaharu Amiya	May 28, 2005
Jasmine returns to DenTech City to take care of an injured dolphin named Hoshi (meaning "star"). Hoshi was injured when being used by the Neo WWW to smuggle DarkChips. Lan, Yahoot, Dex, and Jasmine team up to defeat Inukai and SavageMan in their latest schemes. In the end, Jasmine receives the Crest of Duo.
35	"Queen Fight!"; Transliteration: "Kuīn faito!" (Japanese: クィーンファイト！)	Naoyoshi Kusaka	Katsuhiko Chiba	June 4, 2005
At a convention center, a Ms. Tiara contest is held with a chance for girls to win a golden tiara, and many girls from DenTech City enter. A rivalry quickly builds between Maddy and Tesla. Tesla attempts to steal the tiara, so Charlie appears to intervene, and all of the girls aid Lan in Neo WWW's defeat. Ms. Mari ultimately wins the contest, and both Charlie and Tesla receive Crests of Duo.
36	"Another Rockman"; Transliteration: "Mō hitori no Rokkuman" (Japanese: もう一人のロックマン)	Naoyoshi Kusaka	Mayori Sekijima	June 11, 2005
MegaMan has startling dreams where he murders his NetNavi friends, and he becomes nervous when he learns his friends were injured the night before. Though MegaMan's system tests normal, MegaMan begins causing mischief, leading to his eventual arrest. After an emotional separation, Lan realizes that he isn't MegaMan, and the NetNavi unveils himself as Dark MegaMan. The real MegaMan has been captured by Darkloids CosmoMan, LarkMan, BlizzardMan, and CloudMan. Ms. Yuri helps Lan rescue his NetNavi, and ShadowMan even reappears to assist. The Darkloids thus escape.
37	"Fireworks for Deko"; Transliteration: "Deko ni sasageru hanabi" (Japanese: デコにささげる花火)	Osamu Inoue	Mayori Sekijima	June 18, 2005
Dr. Hikari researches the Crests of Duo and discovers that those marked with it have higher synchro-ratings, meaning CrossFusion is more possible with them. Meanwhile, Yai is planning a fireworks party, so she urges Lan to bring Fyrefox and Mr. Match to help with the festivities. However, BlizzardMan and CloudMan attack with orders to delete MegaMan, and they transform the hall into a raging blizzard. Lan, Dex, Mr. Match, Dingo, and Fyrefox all team up to overcome the Darkloids, and Fyrefox is able to delete BlizzardMan in the real world using a firework dispenser. Fyrefox thus receives the Crest of Duo.
38	"Love Meteorology"; Transliteration: "Koi no ryūsei uranai" (Japanese: 恋の流星占い)	Naoyoshi Kusaka	Katsuhiko Chiba	June 25, 2005
Lan introduces Maylu to Jasmine, but she quickly becomes jealous of the relationship the two have developed. Having been marked by Duo, Lan and Jasmine can see Duo's comet, but Maylu cannot. Likewise, Meddy and Roll compete for MegaMan's affection. Meanwhile, a fortune-teller named Romeda wants to make a huge prediction, so her NetNavi Asteroid NovaMan causes a meteor to come crashing down towards Earth. Maylu intervenes and helps Lan defeat NovaMan and stop the meteor. Together, they stand and watch Duo's comet, signifying Maylu too received the Crest of Duo.
39	"Cross Fusion Impossible?"; Transliteration: "Kurosu fyūjon funō?" (Japanese: クロスフュージョン不能？)	Tsuyoshi Nagasawa	Masaharu Amiya	July 2, 2005
Neo WWW calculate a plan to prevent the creation of Dimensional Areas. SavageMan destroys the Sci-Labs's Dimensional Generator, but the attack deletes SavageMan and hospitalizes Famous. Then, because of a solar eclipse, receiving Dimensional Area signals from across seas is impossible, and Neo WWW begins their attack with Lan unable to CrossFuse. The original WWW teams up with their old leader, Dr. Wily, to devise a plan against the Neo WWW. They prove victorious, and VideoMan is also deleted.
40	"Neo WWW Annihilation"; Transliteration: "Neo wārudo surī kaimetsu" (Japanese: ネオWWW壊滅)	Yasunori Urata	Masashi Kubota	July 9, 2005
Lan and Maylu visit an orbital elevator that reaches into space. Once there, however, they become entangled in Tesla's next plan as she hijacks the elevator. Lan and Maylu use CrossFusion to battle DesertMan and FlashMan, succeeding in the deletion of both. As the final Neo WWW members are arrested, Tesla suddenly vanishes, and her four subordinates' memories are erased. Dark MegaMan has taken Tesla hostage in her own hideout.
41	"Top Secret Orders C.F."; Transliteration: "Gokuhi shirei C.F." (Japanese: 極秘指令C.F.)	Naoyoshi Kusaka	Kenichi Araki	July 16, 2005
Dark MegaMan's Darkloids invade NetCity and then retaliate against Lan in the real world, destroying his SynchroChip. To have it repaired, Lan travels to Sharo's CrossFusion Research Institute where Dr. Hikari is stationed. Along the way, the Darkloids attack again, but Lan is rescued by Raika and Charlie, and he is surprised to discover that Charlie has now CrossFused as well.
42	"Below Duo's Comet"; Transliteration: "Dyūo no hoshi no moto ni" (Japanese: デューオの彗星の下に)	Naoyoshi Kusaka	Kenichi Araki	July 23, 2005
The Darkloids take over a large excavation machine and begin rampaging through Sharo. In order to stop them, the CrossFusion Members join together, including Raika, Charlie, Dingo, Jasmine, Princess Pride, and Fyrefox. While they battle, Lan's SynchroChip is stolen by Dusk, ShadowMan's NetOp. Ms. Yuri and SpikeMan intervene and Lan recovers the chip, but as Dusk escapes, he receives the Crest of Duo. The Darkloids escape, and it's revealed that Dr. Regal is commanding the Darkloids.
43	"Worker Miyabi"; Transliteration: "Shigotonin Miyabi" (Japanese: 仕事人ミヤビ)	Tsuyoshi Nagasawa	Mayori Sekijima	July 30, 2005
Dusk is an assassin commanded to delete MegaMan, but he hesitates for the Crest of Duo marks him as Lan's ally. Meanwhile, a bank robber similar to Dusk named Kawase uses Asteroid SwordMan in his crimes, so Lan and Dingo intervene. Dr. Wily offers Dusk the opportunity to live his own life outside of hired assassin work by giving him a SynchroChip, and with it, Dusk CrossFuses and rescues the boys.
44	"Summer! The Sea! Training Camp!"; Transliteration: "Natsu da! Umi da! Gasshuku da!" (Japanese: 夏だ！ 海だ！ 合宿だ！)	Naoyoshi Kusaka	Kenichi Yamada	August 6, 2005
Dr. Hikari and Famous bring the CrossFusion Members together at the beach for special training, but the training session is really just a relaxing vacation in the sun to help calm their nerves. Yai and Anetta also attend, as well as the original WWW members. The gang ends up exploring a haunted house, and Maylu continues to fight Jasmine for Lan's affection.
45	"Stellar Memory"; Transliteration: "Hoshi no kioku" (Japanese: 星の記憶)	Yasunori Urata	Takao Kato	August 13, 2005
The CrossFusion Members meet with Chaud to explore ancient ruins discovered in Netopia which bare Duo's symbol. Inside, a holographic image tells of an alien race that travels to planets via Duo's comet and destroys civilizations that are deemed dangerous. Slur becomes enraged that the heroes have discovered the past of her race and commands the destruction of the ruins. The children barely manage to escape in time.
46	"Pursued Crest"; Transliteration: "Nerawareta monshō" (Japanese: ねらわれた紋章)	Naoyoshi Kusaka	Naoko Marukawa	August 20, 2005
The CrossFusion Members formulate a plan to infiltrate Neo WWW's hideout and rescue Tesla. Also, the member's Crests of Duo have mysteriously faded away, the first three victims being Chaud, Raika, and Princes Pride. Count Zap also assists Mr. Gauss in the rescue of his niece. To pass security, the members must scan their hands. But once inside, the Darkloids Cloudman and LarkMan attack. Battling up to the top, they reach Dark MegaMan, who reveals that Mr. Gauss tricked the members into the tower in exchange for Tesla. The hand scans gave Dark MegaMan the data that rested within Duo's Crests. As the members escape the tower, Tesla CrossFuses and vanishes.
47	"Why Are You Here?"; Transliteration: "Nande omae ga koko ni iru" (Japanese: なんでおまえがここにいる)	Naoyoshi Kusaka	Katsuhiko Chiba	August 27, 2005
Charlie is startled to discover Tesla has been sleeping in his apartment. Meanwhile, Dark MegaMan lures Ms. Yuri into a trap to steal her Crest of Duo. When she refuses to comply, Dr. Regal then appears and steals it himself. Lan, Charlie, and Tesla battle with the remaining Darkloids, deleting CosmoMan and forcing Dark MegaMan to retreat. Dr. Wily explains that Dr. Regal needs the data within the Crests of Duo to achieve access to the power within Duo's comet. Dr. Regal has planned such a thing for decades as he had already taken Baryl's Crest twenty years ago when Baryl was alive.
48	"Countdown to Extinction"; Transliteration: "Shōmetsu e no kauntodaun" (Japanese: 消滅へのカウントダウン)	Yasunori Urata	Masashi Kubota	September 3, 2005
The Asteroids begin invading Earth, and the CrossFusion Members fight to ward them off. However, until Slur is defeated, the numbers will only grow, so while the members battle the Asteroid invasion, MegaMan, ProtoMan, SearchMan, and Colonel jack-in to take Slur down themselves. However, their efforts are futile, and Slur easily overcomes them on her own.
49	"The War of the Unbonded"; Transliteration: "Kizuna naki mono no tatakai" (Japanese: きずななき者の戦い)	Naoyoshi Kusaka	Mayori Sekijima	September 10, 2005
Thirty years ago, Duo's comet had crashed on Earth, and Dr. Regal plans to travel through space and time to absorb its power. MegaMan, ProtoMan, SearchMan, and Colonel rush through time to thwart Dark MegaMan who was sent to help Dr. Regal gain access to the comet. However, Dark MegaMan plans to absorb the power himself and become the ultimate NetNavi, but Slur refuses to allow him to do so by deleting him. Before fading away, Dark MegaMan self-destructs and prevents Dr. Regal from succeeding. The heroes return home, and the remnants of Dark MegaMan's being rejoin with MegaMan's soul, and MegaMan forgives him.
50	"Colonel Barrel"; Transliteration: "Bareru taisa" (Japanese: バレル大佐)	Naoyoshi Kusaka	Kenichi Araki	September 17, 2005
Duo begins to erase the Earth, and in order to stop him, all thirteen CrossFusion Members must join together. However, Baryl has already died. Dr. Wily of the past works with Dr. Wily of the future to send Baryl through time and space using the Spectrum program. Once Baryl arrives in Lan's time, he receives a SynchroChip and uses CrossFusion to help his allies take down another invasion of Asteroids.
51	"Toward a New Future"; Transliteration: "Arata naru mirai e" (Japanese: 新たなる未来へ)	Tsuyoshi Nagasawa	Kenichi Araki	September 24, 2005
Bass reappears and now infused with the power of Nebula Grey, he deletes Slur. Meanwhile, Dr. Regal gains access to Duo's power and begins his attack on Earth, but Duo kills him before beginning the erasure of Earth. The CrossFusion Members travel to Duo's comet, avoiding demise as the Earth vanishes. They confront Duo, begging him to reverse the erasure, but Duo cannot comprehend their pleas, having more interest in CrossFusion instead, a technology similar to his own race's. Baryl then offers to let Duo absorb him so that Duo may understand CrossFusion better, and in return, Earth can be spared. Duo agrees and Baryl makes his sacrifice, returning Earth to normal. Lan then receives a transmission from a very elderly Baryl to reassure everyone that he is fine and peace is finally restored. Back at a restored and repaired Earth, Lan, Maylu, FyreFox, and Chaud throw a fireworks party to celebrate, Charlie and Tesla go on a cruise, Ms. Yuri returns to Ms. Mari's apartment, Dingo returns to his village, Jasmine goes back to her grandfather's home, Raika receives a warm welcome from his pet dog (from Axess), Princess Pride has a photo of Episode 44's vacation framed and put in her office, and Dusk celebrates with World Three at the curry shop.

== The Program of Light and Darkness ==
There is no official confirmation on the movie's exact placement in Stream's storyline. However, because of Dex and Dingo's appearance in the movie, it most likely occurs shortly after episode 22 in which the boys move to DenTech City, but not after episode 29 when elements from the movie begin appearing in the series, specifically those concerning Baryl and Colonel.

Title	Directed by	Written by	Premiere date	DVD release date
Rockman.EXE the Movie: The Program of Light and Darkness (劇場版ロックマンエグゼ 光と闇の遺産, Gekijōban Rokkuman Eguze Hikari to yami no puroguramu)	Takao Kato	Kenichi Araki	March 12, 2005	September 21, 2005
Beams of light are tearing through cities all over the world, deconstructing anything they touch into network data. Dr. Hikari recognizes this as the dreaded "Spectrum" program, and he commands Lan to quickly rush and destroy something called the "Tadashi Hikari" program. As MegaMan rushes to do so, Bass assaults him, but Colonel intervenes. The destruction of the program is interrupted when a large beast named Nebula Grey appears and absorbs it, causing the NetNavis to retreat. Just then, the Spectrum beams tear through an amusement park, deconstructing many of Lan's friends. Dr. Regal reappears, having transformed into a data being after his demise with LaserMan in Axess, and plans to extract the programming written on Dr. Hikari's retinal pattern, completing Spectrum and transforming the planet into network data. Lan, Chaud, and Raika work together to infiltrate a Netopian army base where Dr. Regal goes through with his plan, and Lan encounters a man named Baryl who claims to be Colonel's NetOp. MegaMan jacks-in to the core of the program to stop Regal, and Bass also appears. In a pinch, MegaMan sacrifices his Ultimate Program to Bass, hoping he can defeat Nebula Grey with it. The resulting fusion creates BassCross MegaMan, a being that obliterates Nebula Grey and spoils Regal's plan. The military base begins to crumble, and Bass absorbs Nebula Grey's power for himself. The NetSavers and Dr. Hikari escape, but Baryl remains behind, uttering the reassuring claim that he is "immortal." Everything deconstructed by Spectrum returns to normal, and peace is restored.
