= MegaMan NT Warrior =

Manga and anime

- North American logo of Megaman NT Warrior

ロックマンエグゼ (Rokkuman Eguze)
- Manga
- Written by: Ryo Takamisaki
- Published by: Shogakukan
- English publisher: NA: Viz Media; UK: Viz Media
- Magazine: CoroCoro Comic
- Original run: July 28, 2001 – November 28, 2006
- Volumes: 13
- Anime television series
- Directed by: Takao Kato
- Produced by: Kyōko Kobayashi; Toshihiro Nakazawa
- Written by: Kenichi Araki
- Music by: Katsumi Horii
- Studio: Xebec
- Licensed by: AUS: Magna Pacific; EU: ShoPro Entertainment; NA: Viz Media
- Original network: TV Tokyo
- English network: AU: Network Ten; AUS: Cartoon Network; CA: Teletoon; EU: Jetix; US: Kids' WB
- Original run: March 4, 2002 – March 31, 2003
- Episodes: 56
- Anime television series

Axess
- Directed by: Takao Kato
- Produced by: Yoshikazu Beniya; Hidenori Miyazawa
- Written by: Kenichi Araki
- Music by: Junichi "IGAO" Igarashi
- Studio: Xebec
- Licensed by: AUS: Magna Pacific; EU: Jetix Europe; NA: Viz Media
- Original network: TV Tokyo
- English network: AU: Network Ten; AUS: Cartoon Network; CA: Teletoon; EU: Jetix; IN: Jetix; US: Kids' WB
- Original run: October 4, 2003 – September 25, 2004
- Episodes: 51
- Anime television series

Stream
- Directed by: Takao Kato
- Produced by: Yoshikazu Beniya; Hidenori Miyazawa
- Written by: Kenichi Araki
- Music by: Shuhei Naruse; Junichi "IGAO" Igarashi
- Studio: Xebec
- Original network: TV Tokyo
- Original run: October 2, 2004 – September 24, 2005
- Episodes: 51
- Anime film

Rockman EXE Hikari to Yami no Program
- Directed by: Takao Kato
- Produced by: Hidenori Miyazawa
- Written by: Kenichi Araki
- Music by: Shuhei Naruse
- Studio: Xebec
- Released: March 12, 2005
- Runtime: 50 minutes
- Anime television series

Beast
- Directed by: Takao Kato
- Produced by: Takatoshi Chino
- Written by: Kenichi Araki
- Music by: Shuhei Naruse; Junichi "IGAO" Igarashi
- Studio: Xebec
- Original network: TV Tokyo
- Original run: October 1, 2005 – April 1, 2006
- Episodes: 25
- Anime television series

Beast+
- Directed by: Takao Kato
- Produced by: Takatoshi Chino
- Written by: Kenichi Araki
- Music by: Shuhei Naruse; Junichi "IGAO" Igarashi
- Studio: Xebec
- Original network: TV Tokyo
- Original run: April 8, 2006 – September 30, 2006
- Episodes: 26

MegaMan NT Warrior (Note: Japanese: ロックマンエグゼ, Hepburn: Rokkuman Eguze; lit. 'Rockman.EXE') is a manga and anime series based on the Mega Man Battle Network video game series by Capcom. Though the manga and anime both use the same NT Warrior title, they adapt the Battle Network games differently and contain contrasting plots as a result. The manga series was written by Ryo Takamisaki and ran in Shogakukan's CoroCoro Comic between 2001 and 2006, while the anime television series, produced by Xebec, Nihon Ad Systems and TV Tokyo, ran for five seasons on TV Tokyo in Japan between March 2002 and September 2006, reaching 209 episodes in total in addition to a feature film. Viz Media would license the series for distribution in North America, including all the main chapters of the manga between 2004 and 2008, while the anime would only have its first season and Axess aired on Kids' WB! from 2003 to 2005.

MegaMan NT Warrior takes place in an unspecified year of the 21st century ("200X") in which the Internet has rapidly progressed and is now the driving force of everyday life. Users are able to interact with the Internet using PErsonal Terminal (PET) handheld devices and Net Navigators (NetNavis), online avatars with special functionalities including the ability to delete viruses using Battle Chips. NT Warrior focuses on Lan Hikari and his NetNavi MegaMan.EXE as they, alongside their friends, attempt to stop various villains (initially the crime organization World Three, before diverging later on) from taking over or destroying the world. Both adaptations were commissioned alongside Mega Man Battle Network's development to ensure the series' success.

Upon release, both the anime and manga versions of MegaMan NT Warrior were successful; during its run, the anime drew high viewership in North America and Japan, while the manga adaptation would see monthly sales up to 1.5 million. In 2022, to promote the Mega Man Battle Network Legacy Collection, both the Japanese and English dubs (with the first episode of Axess being available with English subtitles, for unknown reasons) of the anime were re-released onto the official YouTube channel until September 20.

== Plot ==
=== Setting and characters ===
The series focuses on Lan Hikari and his NetNavi, MegaMan.EXE as they build their friendship while dealing with threats from various NetCrime organizations. Along with Lan are friends Maylu Sakurai, Dex Ogreon, Yai Ayano, Tory Froid, and their respective Navis: Roll, GutsMan, Glide, and IceMan. Although the series originally remains fairly close to the first Battle Network game in terms of storyline, it begins to diverge greatly partway into the series. For example, there is no evidence showing that Lan and MegaMan are twin brothers in the anime, unlike in the games where it is revealed near the end of the first Battle Network game.

=== Manga ===
The manga consisted of six storylines, each loosely adapting the elements from the games. The first storyline follows Lan and MegaMan fighting against World Three in a villain of the week format. After a series of attacks by World Three, Lan and MegaMan developed a rare ability of Full-Synchro—a state where the operator and Navi's minds merge together, allowing for quicker reactions at the cost of any damage on the Navi also being inflicted on the operator. Due to this, he is given a Net-Battler license and officially employed by the police to help in defeating World Three. Eventually, the leader of World Three, Dr. Wily, starts a massive attack on the world's electronics and intends to use his creation, the Life Virus, to control the satellites in space to destroy the Earth. Lan and MegaMan managed to find an opening and defeat the Life Virus with MegaMan got blown all the way to the underground Internet, the Undernet.

In the second storyline, Lan and MegaMan fight the remnants of World Three, only to be suddenly attacked by the strongest Navi of the Undernet, the "Black Shadow" Bass. They are swiftly defeated, but promise each other to improve their skills for an eventual rematch. Both soon enter an ancient pyramid and encounter PharaohMan, a NetNavi coming from an ancient civilization who bestows them the power of Hub-Style upon his deletion. MegaMan's new power attracted the attention of criminal organization, Grave, who aims to rob MegaMan's power by using their Multibug Organism, Grave Beast. Bass joined the fight and started their long awaited rematch, with MegaMan emerging victorious.

After Grave's destruction, Lan and MegaMan were approached by a famous Net-Battler instructor, Mr. Famous, who warned them of new enemies in the form of dark power led by the Quartet of Evil that rendered Hub Style useless. The dark power soon surrounds the city, causing Net Navis within to materialize in the real world. Mr. Famous assembled experienced Net-Battlers to combat the threat, but all were defeated save for Lan and MegaMan, and their friends, Chaud Blaze and ProtoMan who gained new power called the Muramasa-style from the King of Undernet, Serenade. Together, they defeat the Quartet of Evil, who have accumulated the darkness to revive Bass as a Dark Navi. Bass began his attack on the human world, absorbing Serenade in the process. Using the new program left behind by Serenade, Double Soul, MegaMan gained a new form, the Proto Soul, by absorbing 99% of ProtoMan's power and defeated Bass. However, after Bass' defeat, two Dark Navis, LaserMan and MegaMan DS (Dark Soul), revealed themselves as Darkloids, the true preparators of the Dark Navis.

The dark dome recedes, and NetNavis return to their PETs and the Cybernet. With the assistance of a NetNavi from Schaero, SearchMan, and BubbleMan, they find the black hole that the Darkloids used to enter their world. MegaMan and Lan used Hub Style to enter the black hole and were confronted by MegaMan DS who has ShadeMan separate MegaMan and Lan's consciousness, and severely injured Lan to make MegaMan gave in to his hatred, which reinforced MegaMan DS' power and allowed him to completely absorb Bass. ProtoMan and SearchMan followed MegaMan, and with their combined efforts as well as Bass rebelling from inside MegaMan DS, finally defeated MegaMan DS and LaserMan. A Netopia army led by NetNavi Colonel arrived shortly and destroyed the remaining the Dark Loids and close the portal to the Dark Cybernet. Days later, the Netopia army received the order to imprison MegaMan fearing a potential Double-Soul between him and Bass would result in world destruction, forcing MegaMan to be on the run.

Lan followed MegaMan to Netopia with Chaud's help and discovered that the Netopia Army has been infiltrated by the Darkloids. After proving himself trustworthy, Colonel and his operator Baryl allowed MegaMan and Lan to join their cause to defeat the Darkloids led by Regal. In retaliation, Regal unleashes the dark program Nebula Gray which threatens to absorb the Cybernet. The Netopia Military attempts to invade Regal's server but are wiped out by Nebula Gray except for Colonel. Attracted by Nebula Gray's dark power, Bass also joined the fight, soon followed by MegaMan, ProtoMan, TomahawkMan, and GyroMan. Everyone but MegaMan, Bass, and Colonel were defeated, so MegaMan was left with no choice but to merge himself with Bass, becoming Bass Cross MegaMan. While they overpowered Nebula Gray, the dark program recovered itself by absorbing Bass' power. MegaMan found a new power called Beast Out and used it to finally delete Nebula Gray.

Sometimes after the battle against Nebula Gray, MegaMan was approached by a NetNavi named Iris. She gathered potentially strong NetNavis and told them to fight against each other, and the winner will be bestowed the ultimate program that is capable of resealing Cybeast Gregar, the origin of MegaMan's Beast Out power. As the NetNavis battleed each other to retrieve the loser's Navi Mark, another Cybeast called Falzar appeared and targeted him. MegaMan was given the Navi Marks of his friends, but was still incapable of defeating Falzar. Bass appeared and absorbed Falzar's power, but Gregar and Falzar fused with each other into Cybeast Grezar to replace the power they have lost. Their fusion turns reality into data and absorbs it, with only MegaMan and Bass left to fight Grezar. Eventually, MegaMan with his Super Beast Out power destroyed the Grezar's core and was seemingly deleted in the explosion, leaving Lan distraught. A year later, the Cybernet was re-opened and MegaMan returned, happily reuniting with Lan.

=== Anime ===
EXE is roughly split into two separate storylines. The first concerns the original World Three and Mr. Wily's plan on finding the Ultimate NetNavi, culminating in the N1 Grand Prix, a NetBattling tournament. At its conclusion, the Ultimate NetNavi PharaohMan awakens from his slumber and proceeds to claim the net as his own, deleting MegaMan in the process. PharaohMan would eventually be weakened by the two tournament finalists, ProtoMan and a newly rebuilt MegaMan with a Style Change option, leading to his capture by Wily. The second half of the season has the characters take on Grave, a NetMafia syndicate spearheaded by Wily that seeks to create a virus beast with the capability to destroy the Net.

Months later, Lan's father Dr. Yuichiro Hikari completes his research on the Synchro Chip, a device that enables Operators and NetNavis to become one through the use of Cross Fusion. This development coincides with a plot by Nebula (led by the notorious Dr. Regal) and the Darkloids to take over both the human and cyberworlds. Lan manages to use the then-untested Synchro Chip to Cross Fuse with MegaMan and defeat the Darkloids that materialize in the real world with the aid of Dimensional Area Generators. Because of this, Lan is invited to become a NetSaver (Net Savior), an Official NetBattler charged with protecting the net. As a result of Cross Fusion, MegaMan loses his Style Change option, but instead gains the ability to use Double Soul (Soul Unison), which allows him to combine his powers with other NetNavis.

Following the end of Axess, Duo, a being from outer space who seeks to destroy humanity after witnessing the chaos caused by Dr. Regal, appears. Intrigued by Cross Fusion, he decides to spare mankind temporarily, bestowing a test upon the main characters to assess whether or not humans truly merit survival. He sends his subordinate, Slur, to Earth, where she hands Navis possessing the powers of Duo's asteroid, to unsuspecting people to observe what they will do with such might. Lan and the other Net saviors must work together to foil Duo and his subordinate. In the process, Neo WWW is formed by Tesla Gauss to cause havoc. Dr. Regal also returns during the movie, and again towards the end of Stream, with the focus of Stream shifting to time travel.

Beast introduces the warring Cybeasts Gregar and Falzar, as well as the Navi Trill. Pitted against the newly emerged Zoanoroid armies of the Cybeasts, Lan, MegaMan, and a select group of their partners, find themselves drawn into the parallel world of Beyondard. Guided by a mysterious girl, Iris, they join the human resistance in the fight to claim the "Synchronizer" powers of Trill, with which MegaMan is able to "Beast Out". Nearing the end of Beast, the android brain belonging to Wily of Beyondard reveals himself along with his lackeys, Blackbeard and Yuika, hoping to acquire the victor Cybeast as his new body. Ultimately, the two merge into Cybeast Grezar, which becomes Wily's vessel with assistance from Trill's powers. MegaMan and Trill merge and lend their strength to Lan to form a "Juuka Style" into Cross-Fusion Beast Out MegaMan, giving him the strength to destroy it.

Beast+ consists of a string of arcs beginning with the appearance of the Professor and Zero (both from Mega Man Network Transmission). An ex-WWW member, the Professor recovers the remains of Grezar, intent on reviving it for his own purposes. Following its deletion and Zero's decision to break ties with his master, the second arc takes place. The vengeful Professor, however, later resurfaces, unleashing a new subordinate known as Zero One. Moved by the kindness that has been shown to him, Zero sacrifices himself to put a stop to the Professor once and for all. The storyline then continues toward its finale with the introduction of Cache, the final boss of the Japan-exclusive mobile game Phantom of Network, who threatens to consume the world with the aid of Phantom Navis and cache data before being defeated by Cross-Fusion MegaMan.

== Media ==
=== Manga ===
The MegaMan NT Warrior manga series was written and illustrated by Ryo Takamisaki and published in the Shogakukan magazine CoroCoro Comic; Takamisaki stated the decision for a loose adaptation was requested by Capcom early on in its development, since they felt a direct adaptation would be too boring for readers. Prior to the first game's release, Takamisaki was only able to access press material, and had to base the setting off what he had until he was able to obtain a copy, at which point he went back and reworked anything that contradicted the lore.

A total of 13 tankōbon (bound volumes) were published in Japan from July 2001 to November 2006. All 13 volumes of the series were licensed in North America by Viz Media and published between May 19, 2004, and February 5, 2008.

=== Anime ===
The anime adaptation first aired on TV Tokyo March 4, 2002. It spawned four sequels, Axess, Stream, Beast, and Beast+. The total number of episodes between all 5 series is 209. There was also a feature film within the Stream storyline subtitled Program of Light and Darkness. Only the first and second (Axess) series were adapted into English. The English adaptation was produced by Viz Media and recorded by Ocean Productions; it was announced by Warner Bros. on February 14, 2003, and first aired May 17, 2003, on Kids' WB in the United States and Teletoon in Canada. After airing just 13 episodes, the series went on hiatus before continuing on May 1, 2004, with 26 more episodes. Jetix Europe acquired Pay-TV rights to the series in a majority of regions from ShoPro Entertainment in March 2004.

The English adaptation of Axess aired in February 2005 in the United States and April 2005 in Canada, with the first episode airing as a "sneak preview" on November 22, 2004. It would be dropped and revived only to complete the final episodes from Axess before dropping it once more, leaving the series unfinished. In May 2005, it was announced that the anime would be licensed for Latin American regions in summer 2005. As with many anime series airing at the time, MegaMan NT Warrior underwent censorship; in particular, names relating to either fire or explosives were changed to remove such references.

For South-East Asian countries, Voiceovers Unlimited produced an alternate English dub using the original Japanese terms, opening, and ending themes; unlike the Viz Media adaptation, this dub was completely uncensored.

Season	Episodes		Originally released		Producers
Season	Episodes		First released	Last released	Producers
EXE (Note: Both seasons are referred to on the Japanese DVDs as "First Area" and "Second Area")	56	25	March 4, 2002	August 26, 2002	Kyōko Kobayashi; Toshihiro Nakazawa
EXE	56	31	September 2, 2002	March 31, 2003	Kyōko Kobayashi; Toshihiro Nakazawa
Axess	51		October 4, 2003	September 25, 2004	Yoshikazu Beniya; Hidenori Miyazawa
Stream	51		October 2, 2004	September 24, 2005	Yoshikazu Beniya; Hidenori Miyazawa
Beast	25		October 1, 2005	April 1, 2006	Takatoshi Chino
Beast+	26		April 8, 2006	September 30, 2006	Takatoshi Chino

=== Film ===
The movie, Rockman EXE Hikari to Yami no Program (劇場版ロックマンエグゼ 光と闇の遺産(プログラム)), was shown alongside the Duel Masters feature film, Duel Masters: Curse of the Deathphoenix, as part of a double-billing March 12, 2005, in Japan. The film itself is set during the events of the franchise's third season, Stream

=== Music ===
Japanese opening themes

1. "Rockman's Theme ~Pierce Through the Wind~" (ロックマンのテーマ〜風を突き抜けて〜, Rokkuman no Tēma ~Kaze o Tsukinukete~) by Jin Hashimoto (EXE)
2. "Two Futures" (二つの未来, Futatsu no Mirai) by Michihiro Kuroda (Axess)
3. "Be Somewhere" by Buzy (Stream)
4. "Song of Victory" (勝利のうた, Shōri no Uta) by Dandelion (Beast)

Japanese ending themes

1. "Piece of Peace" by mica (EXE, eps 1–25)
2. "begin the TRY" by Shōtarō Morikubo (EXE, eps 26–56)
3. "To Where the Light Is" (光とどく場所, Hikari to Doku Basho) by Kumiko Higa and Akiko Kimura (Axess)
4. "Doobee Doowop Communication" (ドゥビドゥワ コミュニケーション, Dubiduwa Komyunikēshon) by Babamania (Stream, eps 1–25)
5. "To Where the Light Is ~ The Symbol of Friendship (光とどく場所〜友情のしるし, Hikari to Doku Basho ~ Yūjo no Shirushi) by Kumiko Higa and Akiko Kimura (Stream, eps 26–51)
6. "Footsteps" (あしあと, Ashiato) by Clair (Beast)

== Merchandise ==
Merchandising for the Rockman.EXE series was heavy in Japan with a variety of toys. Toys ranged from action figures and plush dolls to board games and trading cards. Many toys were originally released by Bandai, including an electronic Plug-In PET replica of the PET used in the original EXE, but Takara took over with merchandising starting with Axess. Electronic PET toys have since been released with every new model used in the show: Advanced PET and Advanced PET II (Axess), Progress PET (Stream), and Link PET and Link PET_EX (Beast and Beast+). Battle Chips for use in the PETs are often packaged with other merchandise, including action figures and even Japanese installments of Battle Network video games.

Most of the merchandise remains Japan-exclusive. However, to help promote the English version of the anime series, Mattel created a line of original MegaMan NT Warrior action figures for the U.S. market. The series were released in two waves with a third wave planned but never released. The action figures featured many prominent characters from the anime with detachable limbs —interchangeable with other figures — so that Battle Chip weaponry could be attached. Mattel also released all twelve DoubleSoul MegaMan figures (featured in Battle Network 4 and Axess) with detachable armor, as well as various miniature figurines (usually depicted in battle) and a few taller figurines, including a talking CrossFusion MegaMan figure.

Furthermore, the Advanced PET toy (featured in Axess) was imported in three available designs: blue/gray (MegaMan), red/black (ProtoMan), and black/purple (Bass). The Advanced PET II model was planned but never released. English Battle Chips were packaged with nearly every piece of MegaMan NT Warrior merchandise, but chips could also be bought separately in booster packs. Japanese and English Battle Chips will work on either Japanese or English versions of the PETs, although only the Progress PET featured backwards compatibility with previous generations of Battle Chips.

In 2004, Decipher also distributed a trading card game in the United States called "MegaMan NT Warrior Trading Card Game". It was released on May 26, 2004. However, it was not a translation of the pre-existing trading card games in Japan. Three sets were released before the game was discontinued in 2005, after the end of the Mega Man Battle Network video games.

In Japan, various soundtracks have been released featuring background music and theme songs used in the show. Additionally, every episode of the anime has been released across sixty-five DVDs usually containing three episodes per disc. In the United States, thirteen DVDs have been released covering the original 52 episodes of EXE, including the English and Spanish dubs; the first six volumes were also released in VHS form, while the English version of Axess has yet to be released on DVD. In 2022, as part of promotion for the Mega Man Battle Network Legacy Collection, it was announced that both dubs would be temporarily re-released onto YouTube via the official Mega Man channel; episodes of the Japanese version released on December 14, while the English version was streamed on Twitch before their release.

Other merchandise includes a life-sized Mega Buster that fires foam darts, an original MegaMan NT Warrior-themed board game, and MegaMan.EXE Halloween costumes.

== Reception ==
MegaMan NT Warrior achieved popularity among Japanese viewing audiences. According to a viewership sample conducted in the Kantō region by Video Research, the anime drew in an average of 4.5% and a maximum of 5.9% of households during the last year of its original run. During the English dub's run, Kids' WB! wrote that the series had outperformed all competitors with similar demographics. The manga adaptation reportedly sold 1.5 million units per volume in Japan alone.

The MegaMan NT Warrior: Program of Light and Dark and Duel Masters: Curse of the Deathphoenix double feature ranked first for the weekend ending March 13, 2005, dethroned Lorelei: The Witch of the Pacific Ocean from the first place and broke the record for spring break in Japan with a gross of US$12,708,498. This record lasted for 5 weeks until Constantine broke the record with a gross of US$14,859,234 on April 17, 2005, and dropped to ranked fifth at the Japanese box office for the weekend ending March 20, 2005, with a gross of $1,093,870 USD. The following week it dropped to seventh place with US$559,800 and a cumulative box office gross of US$6,178,840 at three weeks of release.

== See also ==
- List of television shows based on video games
- Mega Man Star Force (TV series)
