= List of beat 'em ups =

Beat 'em ups are video games which place a fighter or group of fighters in a world of many adversaries, and the goal is to defeat them via punching or kicking or striking with handheld weapons such as clubs.

It is often useful to characterise gameplay as either 2D (largely characterised by the player walking only to the left or right) or 3D (characterised by full movement in the implied horizontal plane, sometimes also with a button for jump). Graphics can likewise be categorised as 2D (with sprites, sometimes with an isometric or parallax effect) or 3D (polygons), or hybrid (e.g. sprite characters in front of polygon backgrounds, or vice versa).

== Beat 'em ups ==
Graphics	2D gameplay	3D gameplay
2D (sprites)	(Also known as single-plane or side-scrolling): After the War - Dinamic Multimedia; Altered Beast - Sega; Astro Boy: Omega Factor - Treasure/Sega; Atrog - Zafiro; Bad Dudes vs. DragonNinja / DragonNinja - Data East / Imagine Entertainment; Bad Street Brawler / Street Hassle / Bop' N Rumble - Beam Software; Batman: The Brave and the Bold; Batman Forever - Probe Entertainment (Game Gear, MS-DOS), Acclaim Entertainment (SNES, Genesis, Game Boy); Battle Zeque Den - Arsys Software; Billy 2 - Loriciels; Black Belt - Sega; Bob Winner - Loriciels; Bronx - Animagic; Bruce Lee - Datasoft; China Gate - Technōs; China Warrior - Hudson Soft; Dan the Man - Halfbrick Studios; Deathkick - Blaby Computer Games; Dragon Ball: Advanced Adventure - Dimps; Eightman - Pallas; Guardian Heroes - Treasure; Fighting Warrior / Kung-Fu II: Sticks of Death - Melbourne House; Freddy Hardest in South Manhattan / Guardian Angel / The Guardian Angel - Imagine Entertainment / Codemasters; Gadget Twins - Imagitec Design; Gladiator - Taito; Hammerfist - Vivid Image; I Am The Hero - Crazyant; International Ninja Rabbits - Microvalue; Karateka - Broderbund; Knight Force - Titus Software; Kung-Fu Master - Irem; Last Action Hero - Sony Imagesoft; Mad Stalker: Full Metal Force - Family Soft/Fill-in-Cafe; Marvel Super Heroes: War of the Gems - Capcom; Michael Jackson's Moonwalker - Sega; My Hero - Sega; Ninja/Ninja Mission - Sculptured Software/Mastertronic; The Ninja Warriors series; The Ninja Warriors - Taito; Ninja Warriors - Natsume Co., Ltd. (SNES); Panzer Bandit - Fill-in-Cafe; Power and Magic - Zigurat; Power Rangers series; Mighty Morphin Power Rangers - Natsume Co., Ltd. (SNES); Mighty Morphin Power Rangers: The Movie - Sims, Bandai (SNES); Power Rangers: Time Force - Vicarious Visions; Power Rangers: Ninja Storm - Natsume Co., Ltd.; Rapid Angel -Techno Soleil; Red Heat - Ocean; Rescate en el Golfo - OperaSoft; Running Battle - Sega; Saboteur - Durell; Shanghai Warriors - Players; Shank series - Klei Entertainment; Shank; Shank 2; S.P.Y Special Project Y - Konami; Spartan X series - Irem; Kung-Fu Master / Spartan X; Spartan X 2; Splatterhouse series - Namco; Splatterhouse; Splatterhouse: Wanpaku Graffiti; Splatterhouse 2; Street Gang - Time Warp; Subway Vigilante - Players; Teen Titans (GBA) - A2M; Tiny Toon Adventures: Buster's Bad Dream - Treasure; Top Hunter: Roddy & Cathy - SNK; Two Crude - Data East; Vigilante - Irem; X-Men: Mutant Apocalypse - Capcom; X-Men: Mutant Wars - Matrix Software; Way of the Tiger - Gremlin Interactive; Western Express / Express Raider - Data East; Wild Streets - Titus Software	(Also known as belt scroll): Act of Fighter - SoftStar; 64th Street - Jaleco; Advance Guardian Heroes / Guardian Heroes 2 - Treasure; Alien Storm - Sega; Alien vs. Predator (Arcade) - Capcom; Alien vs Predator (SNES) - Jorudan; Arabian Fight - Sega; Arabian Magic - Taito; Armored Warriors / Powered Gear: Strategic Variant Armor Equipment - Capcom; Asterix - Konami; Batman Beyond: Return of the Joker (GBC) - Kemco; Batman Forever: The Arcade Game - Iguana Entertainment; Batman Returns (SNES) - Konami; Batman Returns (NES) - Konami; Battle Circuit - Capcom; Battletoads series - Rare; Battletoads (1991 video game); Battletoads & Double Dragon; Battletoads in Battlemaniacs - Rare (SNES), Virgin Interactive (SMS); Battletoads / Super Battletoads; Beats of Rage - Senile Team; Big Fight: Big Trouble in the Atlantic Ocean - Tatsumi; Black Touch '96 - DGRM; Blade Master - Irem; Brute Force - Leland Corporation; Bucky O'Hare - Konami; Burning Fight - SNK; Cartoon Network: Battle Crashers - Magic Pockets; Cadillacs and Dinosaurs / Cadillacs Kyouryuu Shin Seiki - Capcom; Captain America and The Avengers - Data East; Captain Commando - Capcom; Castle Crashers - The Behemoth; Charlie Murder - Ska Studios; Cliffhanger - Sony Imagesoft; The Combatribes - Technōs Japan; Corsarios - OperaSoft; Crime Fighters series - Konami; Crime Fighters; Vendetta / Crime Fighters 2; Violent Storm / Crime Fighters 3; Crows: The Battle Action - Athena; The Crystal of Kings - BrezzaSoft; Cyborg Justice - Novotrade International; D. D. Crew - Sega; Dark Judgement - Frankenstein Studio; The Death and Return of Superman - Blizzard Entertainment / Sunsoft; Defenders of Dynatron City - Lucasfilm; Denjin Makai series - Banpresto; Denjin Makai; Guardians / Denjin Makai II; DJ Boy series - Kaneko; DJ Boy; B.Rap Boys!; Double Dragon series - Technōs Japan; Double Dragon (video game); Double Dragon II: The Revenge; Double Dragon 3: The Rosetta Stone - East Technology; Super Double Dragon / Double Dragon 4; Double Dragon Neon; Dragon Bowl - Nics; Dragon's Crown - Vanillaware - Atlus; Dungeon & Guarder - Game Park; Dungeons & Dragons series - Capcom; Dungeons & Dragons: Tower of Doom; Dungeons & Dragons: Shadow over Mystara; Dungeon Fighter Online - Neople; Dungeon Magic / Lightbringer - Taito; Dynamite Düx - Sega; Electronic Popple - Byteshock; Fight'N Rage - Seba Games Dev; Final Fight series - Capcom; Final Fight; Mighty Final Fight - Capcom; Final Fight 2 / Fainaru Faito 2; Final Fight 3 / Final Fight Tough / Fainaru Faito Tafu; Final Vendetta - Bitmap Bureau; Franko series - Blue Sunset Games; Franko: The Crazy Revenge - World Software; Skinny & Franko: Fists of Violence - Blue Sunset Games; Gaiapolis - Konami; Gaia Crusaders - Noise Factory; Gang Wars - Alpha Denshi; Gekido Advance: Kintaro's Revenge - Naps Team; The Gladiator / Shen Jian Fu Mo Lu / Shen Jian Fengyun - International Games System; G.I. Joe: Wrath of Cobra - Maple Powered Games; Golden Axe series - Sega; Golden Axe; Golden Axe II; Golden Axe: The Revenge of Death Adder; Golden Axe III; Gourmet Warriors / Gurume Sentai Barayarō - Virgin Interactive / Piko Interactive; Growl - Taito; Guardians of the 'Hood - Atari Games; Hachoo! - Jaleco; Her Knights: All for Princess - Byulbram; Hook (Arcade) - Irem; Jackie Chan Adventures: Legend of the Dark Hand - Torus Games; Judge Dredd (unreleased) - Midway Games; Justice League Heroes: The Flash - WayForward Technologies; Iron Commando - Arcade Zone; Kabuki-Z - Kaneko; Karate Blazers - Video System; The King of Dragons - Capcom; Knights of the Round - Capcom; Knights of Valour series - International Games System; Knights of Valour; Knights of Valour 2; Knights of Valour 3; Knights of Valour: The Seven Spirits - International Games System, Sega Sammy Holdings; Knuckle Bash series - Toaplan; Knuckle Bash; Knuckle Bash 2; Last Beat Enhanced - 7 Raven Studios; Lethal Weapon (NES, Game Boy) - Ocean; Kozure Ookami - Nichibutsu; Kung Food - Atari Corporation; Kunio-kun series - Technōs Japan; Renegade / Nekketsu Kōha Kunio-kun; River City Ransom / Street Gangs / Downtown Nekketsu Monogatari - Technōs (NES), Million (GBA), SPS (X68000), KID (TurboGrafx-16); Double Dragon II/ Nekketsu Kōha Kunio-kun: Bangai Rantō-hen / Kunio-kun 3 (Game Boy); Downtown Special: Kunio-kun's Historical Period Drama! / Kunio-kun 4; Shodai Nekketsu Kōha Kunio-kun / Kunio-kun 5; Shin Nekketsu Kōha: Kunio-tachi no Banka / Kunio-kun 6; River City Ransom: Underground - Conatus Creative Inc.; River City Girls - Arc System Works; Last Action Hero (Amiga) - The Dome; Legend - Arcade Zone; Legend (1998 remake) - Toka; Legend of Heroes - Limenko; The Legend of Silkroad series - UNiCO Electronics; The Legend of Silkroad; Age Of Heroes - Silkroad 2; Legionnaire - TAD; Little Fighter series; Little Fighter - Marti Wong; Little Fighter 2 - Marti Wong, Starsky Wong; Little Fighter Online - Marti Wong, Oscar Chu; Marvel Cosmic Invasion; Mazin Saga: Mutant Fighter - Dynamic Planning; Metro-Active X - Metro-Star; Metamorphic Force - Konami; Mighty Morphin Power Rangers: The Movie - Banpresto (Genesis); Mighty Morphin Power Rangers Rita's rewind - digital eclipse; Mother Russia Bleeds - Le Cartel Studio; Mug Smashers - Electronic Devices, 3D Games; Mutant Rampage: Bodyslam (CD-i) - Animation Magic; Mutation Nation - SNK; Nekketsu Oyako - Technosoft; Night Slashers - Data East; Ninja Baseball Bat Man - Irem; Ninja Clowns - Strata, Incredible Technologies; Ninja Combat - Alpha Denshi; Ninja Gaiden / Shadow Warriors - Tecmo; Ninja Kids - Taito; Oriental Legend series - International Games System; Oriental Legend; Oriental Legend Super; Oriental Legend Super Plus; Oriental Legend 2; The Pirates of Dark Water (SNES) - Sunsoft; P.O.W.: Prisoners of War - SNK; Pu·Li·Ru·La - Taito; The Punisher - Capcom; Raging Justice - MakinGames; Renegade series; Renegade / Nekketsu Kōha Kunio-kun - Technōs / Imagine Entertainment; Target: Renegade - Imagine Entertainment; Renegade III: The Final Chapter - Imagine Entertainment; Riot Zone - Westone Bit Entertainment; Riot City - Sega, Westone; Rival Turf! / Rushing Beat series - Jaleco; Rival Turf! / Rushing Beat; Brawl Brothers / Rushing Beat Ran Fukusei Toshi; The Peace Keepers / Rushing Beat Syura; Robo Army - SNK; Rumble Dragon - RETSUZAN; San Guo Yan Yi: Huo Shao Chi Bi - Gamtec (Mega Drive); Sailor Moon series - Angel; Sailor Moon - Angel (SNES), Arc System Works (Genesis); Sailor Moon R; Pretty Soldier Sailor Moon - Gazelle, Banpresto; Scott Pilgrim vs. the World: The Game - Ubisoft; Sengoku series - SNK; Sengoku; Sengoku 2; Sengoku 3 - Noise Factory; Shadow Force - Technōs; Shingen Samurai-Fighter / Takeda Shingen - Jaleco; Silent Dragon - Taito; The Simpsons Arcade Game - Konami; Sonic Blast Man series - Taito; Sonic Blast Man; Sonic Blast Man II; Spider-Man series - Software Creations; Spider-Man and Venom: Maximum Carnage; Venom/Spider-Man: Separation Anxiety; Spider-Man: The Video Game - Sega; Splatterhouse 3 - Now Production; Stone Protectors - Kemco; Storm series; Eojjeonji Joheun Il-i Saenggil Geot Gateun Jeonyeok - TG Entertainment; Storm: Eojjeonji Joheun Il-i Saenggil Geot Gateun Jeonyeok 2 - MOOV Generation; Streets of Fury - Cyrille Lagarigue / Jordi Asensio; Streets of Rage series - Sega; Streets of Rage; Streets of Rage 2 - Ancient / H.I.C. / Shout! Designworks; Streets of Rage 3; Streets of Rage 4; Streets of Rage Remake - unofficial fangame; Tecmo Knight / Wild Fang - Tecmo; The TakeOver - DANGEN Entertainment; Three Dirty Dwarves - Sega; The Friends of Ringo Ishikawa - Yeo; The Tick - Software Creations; Teenage Mutant Ninja Turtles series; Teenage Mutant Ninja Turtles - Konami; Teenage Mutant Ninja Turtles: Turtles in Time - Konami; Teenage Mutant Ninja Turtles III: The Manhattan Project - Konami; Teenage Mutant Ninja Turtles: The Hyperstone Heist - Konami; TMNT (GBA) - Ubisoft; Teenage Mutant Ninja Turtles: Shredder's Revenge; Tenchi wo Kurau series - Capcom; Dynasty Tribute wo Kurau; Warriors of Fate / Tenchi wo Kurau II: Sekiheki no Tatakai; Tough Turf - Sega, Sunsoft; Ultra Toukon Densetsu - Banpresto / Tsuburaya Productions; Ultraverse Prime / Microcosm - Sony Imagesoft; Undercover Cops - Irem; Vamf x1/2 - Danbi / F2 System; Violent Storm - Konami; Warrior Blade: Rastan Saga Episode III - Taito; Water Margin: A Tale of Cloud and Wind - Piko Interactive; Water Margin: Heroes of the Marsh / Shuihuzhuan: Liangshan Yingxiong - Panda Entertainment; West Adventure / Xi You Ji - Panda Entertainment; Wild C.A.T.s - Playmates Interactive; X-Men - Konami; X-Men: Reign of Apocalypse - Digital Eclipse; Yang Jia Jiang - Yang Warrior Family - Sanxun Information Co.; Zero Team - Seibu Kaihatsu
3D (polygons)	(Also known as 2.5D): Fairy Bloom Freesia - Edelweiss / Nyu Media; Spider-Man: Web of Shadows - Treyarch / Shaba Games (PSP, PS2), Griptonite Games (NDS); Viewtiful Joe series - Clover Studio; Viewtiful Joe; Viewtiful Joe 2; Viewtiful Joe: Red Hot Rumble; Viewtiful Joe: Double Trouble!	Anarchy Reigns - PlatinumGames; Asura's Wrath - CyberConnect2; Ben 10: Protector of Earth - High Voltage Software; Batman: Rise of Sin Tzu - Ubisoft Montreal; Batman Beyond: Return of the Joker - Kemco; Beat Down: Fists of Vengeance - Capcom; The Bouncer - DreamFactory, Square; Capoeira Legends - Donsoft Entertainment; Crisis Beat - Bandai; Cowboy Bebop: Serenade of Reminiscence - Bandai; Crimson Tears - Capcom; The Crow: City of Angels - Gray Matter; Dead Rising - Capcom; Death by Degrees - Namco; Demolish Fist - Sammy, Dimps; Dynamite Deka series - AM1; Die Hard Arcade / Dynamite Deka - AM1, Sega Technical Institute; Dynamite Cop / Dynamite Deka 2; Dynamite Deka EX: Asian Dynamite; EOE: Eve of Extinction - Eidos Interactive; Fantastic Four - Acclaim Entertainment; Fighting Force series - Core Design; Fighting Force; Fighting Force 2; Final Fight: Streetwise - Capcom, Secret Level; Gekido - Naps Team, Gremlin Interactive; God Hand - Clover Studio; Jackie Chan Stuntmaster - Radical Entertainment; Jet Li: Rise to Honor - Sony; Kenka Bancho: Badass Rumble - Atlus; Kung Fu Strike - The Warriors Rise - PC, Xbox 360; MadWorld - PlatinumGames; Mortal Kombat: Shaolin Monks - Midway Games, Paradox Development; Mortal Kombat: Special Forces - Midway Games; Minority Report: Everybody Runs - Activision; Naruto: Uzumaki Cronicles series; Naruto: Uzumaki Chronicles - Cavia; Naruto: Uzumaki Chronicles 2 - Bandai; Perfect Weapon - Gray Matter; Power Rangers Lightspeed Rescue - THQ; Power Rangers Megaforce - Bandai Namco Games; Power Rangers Super Megaforce - Bandai Namco Entertainment; The Rage - FluidGames; Sifu (video game) - Sloclap; Spikeout series - Sega; Spikeout: Digital Battle Online; Slash Out; Spikeout: Battle Street; Spyborgs - Bionic Games; State of Emergency - VIS Entertainment; Transformers: Prime – The Game - Activision; Tokyo Beat Down - Atlus; Teenage Mutant Ninja Turtles series - Konami; Teenage Mutant Ninja Turtles; Teenage Mutant Ninja Turtles 2: Battle Nexus; Teenage Mutant Ninja Turtles 3: Mutant Nightmare; TMNT - Ubisoft; Teenage Mutant Ninja Turtles - Magic Pockets; Urban Reign - Namco; Wario World - Treasure; The Warriors - Rockstar Toronto (PS2, Xbox), Rockstar Leeds (PSP); Watchmen: The End Is Nigh - Deadline Games; X2: Wolverine's Revenge - GenePool Software; X-Men: The Official Game - Z-Axis; Yakuza / Ryū ga Gotoku series - Sega; Kurohyō: Ryū ga Gotoku Shinshō; Yakuza; Yakuza 0; Yakuza 2; Yakuza 3; Yakuza 4; Yakuza 5; Yakuza 6; Yakuza Kiwami; Yakuza Kiwami 2; Zombie Revenge - Sega

== Games with beat 'em up sections ==
- The Adventures of Bayou Billy - Konami
- Asterix & Obelix XXL - Étranges Libellules
- Asterix & Obelix XXL 2: Mission: Las Vegum - Étranges Libellules
- Bebe's Kids - Radical Entertainment
- Bully - Rockstar Vancouver
  - Bully: Scholarship Edition - Rockstar New England
- Crash of the Titans - Radical Entertainment
- Crash: Mind over Mutant - Radical Entertainment
- Darkman - Ocean
- Guilty Gear Isuka - Sammy
- Guilty Gear Judgment - Sammy
- King Kong (2005 video game) - Ubisoft
- Legend of Success Joe - Wave
- Lego video games - TT Games
- Mortal Kombat: Armageddon - Midway
- Ninja Golf - Atari
- S.P.Y. the Special Project Y - Konami
- Shenmue - Sega
- Street Fighter EX3
- Super Smash Bros. Melee - HAL Laboratory / Nintendo
- Super Smash Bros. Brawl - Sora / Nintendo
- Tekken 3 - Namco
- Tekken 4 - Namco
- Tekken 5 - Namco
- Tekken 6 - Namco Bandai
- Wario World - Treasure / Nintendo

== Hack and slash ==
=== 2D ===
- The Astyanax - jaleco
- The Legend of Kage (1985) - Taito
- Captain Silver (1987) - Data East
- Rastan (1987) - Taito
- Tiger Road (1987) - Capcom
- Shinobi series (1987 debut) - Sega
- Ninja Spirit (1988) - Irem
- Ninja Gaiden (Shadow Warriors) series (1988 debut) - Tecmo
- Golden Axe series (1989 debut) - Sega
- Strider series (1989) - Capcom
- Danan: The Jungle Fighter (1990) - Sega
- First Samurai (1991) - Vivid Image
- Saint Sword (1991) - Taito
- Hades (2020) - Supergiant Games
- Hades II (2025) - Supergiant Games

=== 3D ===
- 300: March to Glory - Collision Studios
- Afro Samurai - Namco Bandai Games
- Akuji the Heartless - Crystal Dynamics
- Astral Chain - PlatinumGames
- Asura's Wrath - CyberConnect2
- Attack on Titan - Koei Tecmo
  - Attack on Titan 2
- Bayonetta series - PlatinumGames
  - Bayonetta
  - Bayonetta 2
  - Bayonetta 3
- Beowulf: The Game - Ubisoft
- Blades of Time - Gaijin Entertainment
- Bladestorm: The Hundred Years' War - Omega Force
- Blood Will Tell - Sega Wow/Red Entertainment
- BloodRayne series - Terminal Reality
  - BloodRayne (video game)
  - BloodRayne 2
  - BloodRayne: Betrayal - WayForward
- Bujingai - Taito/Red Entertainment
- Castlevania: Curse of Darkness - Konami
- Castlevania: Lament of Innocence - Konami
- Castlevania: Lords of Shadow - Konami
  - Castlevania: Lords of Shadow - Mirror of Fate
  - Castlevania: Lords of Shadow 2
- Chaos Legion - Capcom Production Studio 6
- Conan - Nihilistic Software
- Dante's Inferno - Visceral Games
- Darksiders series - Vigil Games
  - Darksiders (video game)
  - Darksiders II
  - Darksiders III
- Deadpool - High Moon Studios
- Devil Kings/Sengoku Basara series - Capcom
  - Devil Kings/Sengoku Basara
  - Sengoku Basara 2
- Devil May Cry series - Capcom
  - Devil May Cry
  - Devil May Cry 2
  - Devil May Cry 3: Dante's Awakening
  - Devil May Cry 4
  - Devil May Cry 5
  - DmC: Devil May Cry - Ninja Theory
- Dragon Valor - Namco
- Drakengard series - Cavia
  - Drakengard
  - Drakengard 2
  - Drakengard 3 - Access Games
  - Nier
  - Nier: Automata - PlatinumGames
- Dungeon Magic - Taito
- Dynasty Warriors series - Koei/Omega Force
  - Dynasty Warriors 2
  - Dynasty Warriors 3
  - Dynasty Warriors 4
  - Dynasty Warriors 5
  - Dynasty Warriors 6
  - Dynasty Warriors 7
  - Dynasty Warriors 8
  - Dynasty Warriors 9
- El Shaddai: Ascension of the Metatron - Ignition Tokyo
- Fire Emblem Warriors series - Omega Force/Team Ninja/Nintendo/Koei Tecmo
  - Fire Emblem Warriors
  - Fire Emblem Warriors: Three Hopes
- Gauntlet series - Atari Games
  - Gauntlet: The Third Encounter
  - Gauntlet III: The Final Quest - Tengen
  - Gauntlet Legends
  - Gauntlet Dark Legacy - Midway Games West
  - Gauntlet: Seven Sorrows - Midway Games
- Genji series - Game Republic
  - Genji: Dawn of the Samurai
  - Genji: Days of the Blade
- Ghost Rider - Climax Group
- Gladiator: Sword of Vengeance - Acclaim Studios Manchester
- God of War series - Santa Monica Studio
  - God of War
  - God of War II
  - God of War III
  - God of War: Ascension
  - God of War (2018)
  - God of War Ragnarök
  - God of War: Chains of Olympus - Ready at Dawn
  - God of War: Ghost of Sparta - Ready at Dawn
  - God of War: Betrayal - Javaground/SOE Los Angeles
- Golden Axe: Beast Rider - Secret Level
- Heavenly Sword - Ninja Theory
- Hulk - Radical Entertainment
- Hyrule Warriors series - Omega Force/Team Ninja/Nintendo/Koei Tecmo
  - Hyrule Warriors
  - Hyrule Warriors: Age of Calamity
- Killer Is Dead - Grasshopper Manufacture
- Legacy of Kain: Defiance - Crystal Dynamics/Nixxes Software BV
- The Legend of Korra - PlatinumGames
- Lollipop Chainsaw - Grasshopper Manufacture
- The Lord of the Rings series
  - The Lord of the Rings: The Two Towers - Stormfront Studios/Hypnos Entertainment
  - The Lord of the Rings: The Return of the King - EA Redwood Shores
- Lucifer Ring - Toshiba EMI
- Mazan: Flash of the Blade - Namco
- MediEvil series
  - MediEvil
  - MediEvil 2
  - MediEvil: Resurrection
  - MediEvil (2019)
- Metal Gear Rising: Revengeance - PlatinumGames
- Middle-earth: Shadow of Mordor - Monolith Productions
  - Middle-earth: Shadow of War
- Muramasa: The Demon Blade - Vanillaware
- Nano Breaker - Konami
- Nightmare Creatures -Kalisto Entertainment
  - Nightmare Creatures II
- Ninja Blade - FromSoftware
- Ninja Gaiden: Second Series - Team Ninja
  - Ninja Gaiden
    - Ninja Gaiden Black
    - Ninja Gaiden Sigma
  - Ninja Gaiden Dragon Sword
  - Ninja Gaiden II
    - Ninja Gaiden Sigma 2
  - Ninja Gaiden 3
    - Ninja Gaiden 3: Razor's Edge
  - Yaiba: Ninja Gaiden Z
- No More Heroes series - Grasshopper Manufacture
  - No More Heroes
  - No More Heroes 2: Desperate Struggle
  - Travis Strikes Again: No More Heroes
  - No More Heroes III
- The OneChanbara series - Tamsoft
- Onimusha series - Capcom
  - Onimusha: Warlords
  - Onimusha 2: Samurai's Destiny
  - Onimusha 3: Demon Siege
  - Onimusha: Dawn of Dreams
- Otogi series - FromSoftware
  - Otogi: Myth of Demons
  - Otogi 2: Immortal Warriors
- Persona 5 Strikers - Omega Force/P-Studio/Atlus
- Prince of Persia: The Sands of Time series - Ubisoft
  - Prince of Persia: The Sands of Time
  - Prince of Persia: Warrior Within
    - Prince of Persia: Revelations (PSP)
  - Prince of Persia: The Two Thrones
    - Prince of Persia: Rival Swords (PSP)
  - Prince of Persia: The Forgotten Sands
- Prince of Persia - Ubisoft
- Ragnarok Battle Offline - French Bread
- Red Steel 2 - Ubisoft
- Rune - Human Head Studios
  - Rune: Halls of Valhalla
- Rurouni Kenshin: Enjou! Kyoto Rinne - Banpresto
- Rygar: The Legendary Adventure - Tecmo
- Samurai Champloo: Sidetracked - Grasshopper Manufacture
- Samurai Warrior: The Battles of Usagi Yojimbo - Beam Software / Firebird
- Samurai Warriors series - Koei, Omega Force
  - Samurai Warriors
    - Samurai Warriors: Xtreme Legends
  - Samurai Warriors: State of War
  - Samurai Warriors 2
    - Samurai Warriors 2: Empires
    - Samurai Warriors 2: Xtreme Legends
  - Samurai Warriors 3
- Savage - Probe Software
- Senran Kagura series - Marvelous/Tamsoft
  - Senran Kagura Burst
    - Senran Kagura Burst Re:Newal
  - Senran Kagura 2: Deep Crimson
  - Senran Kagura Shinovi Versus
  - Senran Kagura Estival Versus
- Seven Samurai 20XX - Dimps
- Severance: Blade of Darkness - Rebel Act Studios
- Shadow Force: Henshin Ninja - Technos
- Shinobi series - Sega
  - Shinobi (Arcade)
  - The Revenge of Shinobi
  - Shadow Dancer
  - The Cyber Shinobi
  - Shinobi (Game Gear)
  - Shinobi II: The Silent Fury
  - Shinobi III: Return of the Ninja Master
  - Shinobi Legions
  - Shinobi
  - Nightshade
- Skull & Crossbones - Atari Games
- The werehog gameplay of Sonic Unleashed - Sega
- Soulcalibur Legends - Bandai Namco Entertainment
- Spartan: Total Warrior - The Creative Assembly
- Splatterhouse (2010) - Bandai Namco Entertainment
- Star Wars: The Force Unleashed series - LucasArts
  - Star Wars: The Force Unleashed
  - Star Wars: The Force Unleashed II
- Star Wars: Jedi Fallen Order - Respawn
- Sudeki - Climax Group
- Sword of the Berserk: Guts' Rage - Yuke's
- Sword of Sodan - Innerprise
- Targhan - Silmarils
- Teenage Mutant Ninja Turtles: Mutants in Manhattan - PlatinumGames
- The Nightmare Before Christmas: Oogie's Revenge - Capcom
- Transformers: Devastation - PlatinumGames
- Trinity: Souls of Zill O'll - Omega Force
- Van Helsing - Saffire
- Viking: Battle for Asgard - The Creative Assembly
- Warriors Orochi series - Koei, Omega Force
  - Warriors Orochi
  - Warriors Orochi 2
  - Warriors Orochi Z
- The Wonderful 101 - PlatinumGames
- X-Blades - Gaijin Entertainment
- X-Men Origins: Wolverine - Raven Software
- Xena: Warrior Princess - Vivendi
- Yakuza Kenzan
  - Yakuza Ishin
- Yo-kai Watch Blasters -Level 5
  - Yo-kai Watch Busters 2: Secret of the Legendary Treasure Bambalaya -Level 5

== See also ==
- Beat 'em up
- Hack and slash
- List of fighting games
- crowd combat fighting games
