= Sengoku (1991 video game) =

1991 video game

- Arcade flyer
- Developer: SNK
- Publisher: SNK: Super Famicom Data East Mega-CD Sammy
- Composers: Toshio Shimizu; Yasuo Yamate
- Series: Sengoku
- Platforms: Arcade, Neo Geo AES, Super Famicom, Mega-CD, Neo Geo CD
- Release: February 12, 1991: Arcade; WW: February 12, 1991 Neo Geo AES; WW: July 1, 1991 Super Famicom; JP: September 19, 1993 Mega-CD; JP: December 28, 1993 Neo Geo CD; JP: March 17, 1995; NA: October 1996
- Genres: Beat 'em up, hack and slash
- Modes: Single-player, multiplayer
- Arcade system: Neo Geo MVS

Sengoku (Note: Also known as Legacy of the Warring States (Japanese: 戦国伝承, Hepburn: Sengoku Denshō) in Japan.) is a 1991 hack and slash beat 'em up video game developed and published by SNK for the Neo Geo arcade and home platforms. It was ported to several home consoles, including the Neo Geo AES, Neo Geo CD, Mega-CD and Super Famicom. The game was followed by the sequels Sengoku 2 in 1993 and Sengoku 3 in 2001.

== Gameplay ==
Gameplay screenshot

A player has a maximum of six health points. When certain enemies are defeated, spirits of powerful forms are available to transform into. In the SNES version, transformation cannot be toggled, but stays constant for a limited time. The three different forms are a samurai, an armor-clad wolf, and a more agile ninja. These forms have a limited use. Their attacks and jumps differ from the original form and their powers are enhanced by any power-ups collected.

Throughout the game, the player must survive the hordes of enemies by collecting colored orbs as power-ups. Ten Green orbs heal one health point. A Red orb gives the player a single sword, a Cyan orb gives the player a dual swords, the Purple orb gives the player a two-handed holy sword and a Yellow orb gives the player a limited magical attack. All swords are equally powerful and have no unique abilities over another. Although the magical projectiles is finite and can be deflected, it's the only one that does not clash into combat during sword fights.

== Plot ==
Centuries ago, a cruel and insanely tyrannical warlord was defeated by the two elite Samurai, but had sworn to return in the future. When he does, he unleashes undead forces of feudal Japanese warriors to destroy the world and its people. The warlord is opposed only by the two protagonists: the red-jacketed Claude Yamamoto and cowboy hat-wearing Jack Stone (also known as Dan and Bill in the SNES version), martial artists who turn out to be descendants of the two elite Samurai responsible for vanquishing the wicked warlord centuries ago.

== Reception ==
Sengoku

Review scores
Publication	Score
Computer and Video Games	90/100
Electronic Gaming Monthly	4.4/10
Power Unlimited	85%

In Japan, Game Machine listed Sengoku as the thirteenth most successful table arcade unit of March 1991. In North America, RePlay listed it as the fourth most popular arcade game of March 1991.

On release, Famicom Tsūshin scored the Neo Geo CD version of the game a 19 out of 40. Electronic Gaming Monthly gave the Super Famicom version a 4.4 out of 10, commenting that it "has an interesting concept as you can change into different types of fighters, yet it just doesn't come together." Power Unlimited gave the Neo Geo version a score of 85%, calling it "a top-shelf brawler, even for people who aren't much of a fighter. The game gives you a real fighting feeling, thanks to the great sounds and images."

== Legacy ==
Sengoku was followed by two arcade sequels: Sengoku 2, released in 1993, and Sengoku 3, released in 2001.

In 2008, the arcade version of Sengoku was included in the compilation SNK Arcade Classics Vol. 1 for the PlayStation 2, PlayStation Portable, and Wii. In 2009, all three games in the Sengoku trilogy were compiled as part of Sengoku Anthology for PlayStation 2 and Microsoft Windows. On November 1, 2011, the Neo Geo version of Sengoku was re-released for the Wii Virtual Console in Japan.
