= Arabian Magic =

1992 video game

- North American arcade flyer
- Developer: Taito
- Publisher: Taito
- Director: Yukio Abe
- Producers: Yukio Abe; Kazutomo Ishida
- Artist: Nobuhiro Hiramatsu
- Composer: Norihiro Furukawa
- Platform: Arcade
- Release: September 1992
- Genres: Hack and slash, beat 'em up
- Modes: Single-player, multiplayer
- Arcade system: Taito F3 System

Arabian Magic (Note: Japanese: アラビアンマジック, Hepburn: Arabian Majikku) is a side-scrolling hack-and-slash arcade video game developed by Taito and released in 1992. It was included in Taito Legends 2 for Microsoft Windows, PlayStation 2, and Xbox.

== Gameplay ==
Gameplay screenshot

Arabian Magic has seven different stages, each with one of the powerful guardians awaiting the player at the end of each level. Each guardian, once defeated, will drop a jewel which forms a part of the Jewel of Seven Colors. Guardians, once defeated, will join the player and become a spirit you can summon using the same button as the genie.

Each level is littered with vases and wooden chests which, when broken, reveal treasure items and power-ups. The game has slight RPG elements in that stats, such as life, can be raised. The four player characters have the ability to summon a huge genie. The genie only stays on screen for a moment, but can be indirectly controlled to attack enemies with powerful blows.

== Plot ==
The game is set in the mythical world of The Arabian Nights. Some time ago, the Evil One plagued the peaceful kingdom of Shahariyard. In order to save the King - who, by sorcery, had been transformed into a monkey - a group of heroes must find the Jewel of Seven Colors and release the evil hex, but formidable monsters are lurking along their path.

Prince Rassid, Princess Lisa, Sinbad and Afshaal, each armed with their own special magic and powers, set out on the quest for the Jewel of Seven Colors in order to restore a peace to the kingdom. The game ends when the player has recovered the Jewel of Seven Colors, saved the King (making him human, in the process) and restored peace to Shahariyard.

== Characters ==
Each player can select from four distinctive characters:

- Prince Rassid is the sword-wielding hero, and a well-rounded character who has excellent speed and fast attacks.
- Princess Lisa has excellent reach with her magical scarf, magic-based attacks and also has a special spinning move, performed by tapping forward twice. She is a fast character but suffers defensively.
- Sinbad is a powerful character with a useful flaming sword attack, done by holding the attack button and then releasing.
- Afshaal has excellent reach with his mace and also has a similar spinning attack done in the same manner. He has high defense but suffers in speed.

== Reception ==
In Japan, Game Machine listed Arabian Magic on their November 1, 1992 issue as being the eighteenth most-successful table arcade unit of the month.

Kurt Kalata of Hardcore Gaming 101 compared the game to Sega's beat 'em up Arabian Fight (1992), noting both had a similar Arabian Nights theme and four-player co-op. He said Arabian Fight had more impressive graphics, but Arabian Magic was "the better game" in terms of gameplay.
