= Sengoku 3 =

2001 video game

- Developer: Noise Factory
- Publisher: SNK
- Producer: Keiko Iju
- Designer: Masahiro Maeda
- Programmer: Hidenari Mamoto
- Artists: Masafumi Fujii; Masahiro Maeda; Miyuki Okazaki
- Composer: Toshikazu Tanaka
- Series: Sengoku
- Platforms: Arcade, Neo Geo AES
- Release: Arcade: JP: July 18, 2001; NA: 2001; Neo Geo AES: NA/JP: October 25, 2001
- Genres: Beat 'em up, hack and slash
- Modes: Single-player, multiplayer
- Arcade system: Neo Geo MVS

Sengoku 3 (Note: Also known as Legacy of the Warring States 2001 (Note: Japanese: 戦国伝承 2001, Hepburn: Sengoku Denshō 2001) in Japan.) is a 2001 beat 'em up video game developed by Noise Factory and published by SNK for the Neo Geo arcade and home platforms. It is the third and final entry in the Sengoku series. In the game, players battle against undead enemy spirits. It was re-released through download services for various consoles. It was met with positive reception from critics and reviewers since its initial release.

== Gameplay ==
Gameplay screenshot.

As with previous Sengoku titles, Sengoku 3 is a side-scrolling beat 'em up game where players take control of one of the four initial playable characters with two more characters being unlocked during gameplay across various stages filled with an assortment of undead evil spirits.

== Development and release ==
Sengoku 3 was developed by Noise Factory and was first released for arcades on July 18, 2001. The soundtrack was composed by Toshikazu Tanaka, who was previously employed at SNK and worked on project such as Fatal Fury: King of Fighters. Tanaka stated in an interview that his biggest challenge when composing for the project was getting the music quality nearly up to levels of other games at the time. Tanaka decided on using streaming playback for the music, as he felt he could not guarantee the high quality he desired with previous methods. The sound driver used was not designed with streaming in mind, proving difficult for Tanaka to do so and he considered modify the sound driver himself but could not make it so due to time schedule. However, Tanaka was able to do the work by himself.

Sengoku 3 was later released for the Neo Geo AES system on October 25, 2001. The North American AES release has since become one of the more expensive titles on the platform, with copies fetching over US$2200 on the secondary video game collecting market. In 2013, Sengoku 3 was digitally re-released for the Wii Virtual Console in Japan D4 Enterprise. Sengoku 3 is included in the Neo Geo 25th Anniversary Humble Bundle, released in 2015. Hamster Corporation re-released the game as part of their ACA Neo Geo series for the PlayStation 4, Xbox One, Nintendo Switch, Windows, Android and iOS.

== Reception ==
Reception

Review score
Publication	Score
Nintendo Life	(Wii) 8/10 (Switch) 9/10

Sengoku 3 has been met with positive reception from critics and reviewers alike since its release. Both Kyo and Ben of French magazine HardCore Gamers noted the improved visuals over its predecessors and regarded it to be an "excellent" beat 'em up game.

In 2014, HobbyConsolas identified Sengoku 3 as one of the twenty best games for the Neo Geo AES.

In 2023, Time Extension included the game on their top 25 "Best Beat 'Em Ups of All Time" list.
