= Sengoku 2 =

1993 video game

- Developer: SNK
- Publisher: SNK
- Composer: Yasuo Yamate
- Series: Sengoku
- Platforms: Arcade, Neo Geo AES, Neo Geo CD
- Release: Arcade: WW: February 18, 1993; Neo Geo AES: WW: April 9, 1993; Neo Geo CD: JP: March 17, 1995; NA: October 1996
- Genres: Beat 'em up, hack and slash
- Modes: Single-player, multiplayer
- Arcade system: Neo Geo MVS

Sengoku 2 (Note: Also known as Legacy of the Warring States 2 (Japanese: 戦国伝承 2, Hepburn: Sengoku Denshō Tsū) in Japan.) is a 1993 beat 'em up video game developed and published by SNK for the Neo Geo arcade and home platforms. It is the second installment of the Sengoku series. It was first released for the Neo Geo and Neo Geo CD consoles. In 2009 the series was compiled on a CD titled Sengoku Anthology for the PlayStation 2 and Windows. The Neo Geo version was re-released on the Virtual Console for the Wii in Japan on November 8, 2012, and in the PAL region on February 7, 2013. Hamster Corporation re-released the game as part of their ACA Neo Geo series for the PlayStation 4, Xbox One, Nintendo Switch, Windows, Android and iOS.

== Gameplay ==
Gameplay screenshot.

The gameplay is similar to Sengoku, except that the playable character is constantly armed with a sword for they which can initiate wide plane attacks and vertical slashes. Pressing both attack buttons together allows the character to block or dodge attacks. Another button combo gets the character to perform a special trick attack. The character can also jump and do jump attacks. Occasionally the character would be mounted on horseback and have to carefully hack and slash enemies during a canter.

The player can change their character to one of three warriors assisting the protagonists, including the armour-clad wolf Kirimaru, the shuriken-throwing ninja Mike Walsh, and the staff-wielding Crow Tengu God for a limited time. Various collectible orbs heal the character's health or enhance the character's attack abilities and that of the different forms' capabilities.

== Plot ==
An evil warlord is intent on conquering the world, this time by the use of time travel to conquer every known important event in history. The two protagonists from the previous game, Claude Yamamoto and Jack Stone, are joined by three allies (Mike, Crow and Kirimaru) and sent by priestess Princess Miko from the past to battle the warlord's forces to restore the world's ages and ensure the warlord's conquest never succeeds.

== Reception ==
Reception

Aggregate score
Aggregator	Score
GameRankings	(Neo Geo) 70% (Switch) 70%

Review scores
Publication	Score
AllGame	(Neo Geo) 3/5
Famitsu	(Neo Geo) 24 / 40
GameFan	(Neo Geo) 338 / 400 (Neo Geo) 343 / 400
Nintendo Life	(Wii) 7/10 (Switch) 7/10
Computer+Videogiochi	(Neo Geo) 86 / 100
Consoles +	(Neo Geo) 83%
GamesMaster	(Neo Geo) 68%
Hobby Consolas	(Neo Geo) 90 / 100
Joypad	(Neo Geo) 85%
Megablast	(Neo Geo) 78%
Mega Fun	(Neo Geo) 73% (Neo Geo) 73%
Play Time	(Neo Geo) 76%
Player One	(Neo Geo) 76%

Sengoku 2 has been met with positive reception from critics and reviewers alike since its release.
