= Vendetta (1991 video game) =

1991 video game

- Arcade flyer featuring (clockwise from top left): Hawk, Sledge, Blood, Kate, and Boomer
- Developer: Konami
- Publisher: Konami
- Director: Satoru Okamoto
- Producer: S. Kido
- Programmers: Satoru Okamoto; K. Ozaki; Yuichi Kobayashi
- Artists: M. Yoshida; Kazuaki Nakanishi; T. Nakazawa
- Composers: Michiru Yamane; Hideaki Shikama
- Series: Crime Fighters
- Platform: Arcade
- Release: JP: July 1991; NA: September 1991
- Genre: Beat 'em up
- Modes: Single-player, multiplayer

Vendetta, known in Japan as Crime Fighters 2 (Note: Japanese: クライムファイターズ2, Hepburn: Kuraimu Faitāzu 2), is a 1991 beat 'em up video game developed and published by Konami for arcades. It was released in Japan in July 1991 and in North America in September 1991. It is a sequel to Konami's 1989 game Crime Fighters, although it was marketed internationally as a stand-alone game with no previous connections. Hamster Corporation released the game as part of their Arcade Archives series for the Nintendo Switch and PlayStation 4 in July 2021.

== Gameplay ==
Screenshot from the game's first stage

The player controls the four members of the Cobras, Blood (former prizefighter), Hawk (former professional wrestler), Boomer (a martial artist) and Sledge (a military ex-convict). They fight through waves of enemies to rescue Kate, the fifth member and Hawk's protege, who was kidnapped by the Dead End Gang. As with most beat-em-ups, the game features primarily side-scrolling action. Player score is based on number of opponents eliminated.

The option of attacking an enemy while they are knocked down was new to the genre. The game uses 'punch' and 'kick' buttons rather than 'jump' and 'attack'. The special punch-plus-kick attack is the only aerial attack. Every time this special attack is performed, it takes away one bar of energy from the character. The players can also use different weapons that belong to enemies or are hidden inside boxes, including a shotgun (with limited cartridges), baseball bats, knives, and bottles. Players can also double-team enemies and vice versa.

After defeating the Big Boss at the end of the chapters, the game continues: first it resuscitates all the bosses for a massive final fight, and if the player defeats them all, then the game repeats endlessly, with an amped-up level of difficulty.

== Plot ==
Dead End City is a place controlled with a firm grip by the "Dead End" gang, an endless parade of violent criminals. Their only obstacle is the opposing hero gang, called The Cobras. The Cobras number five members: and Kate, the damsel in distress, described as Hawk's protegee. One day, Kate is kidnapped by the Dead End Gang under the leadership of Faust, who is looking for the leadership of all street gangs in an attempt to take full control of the city. The four men go to enemy territory to save Kate, fighting through the waves of enemies sent against them.

== Development ==
Vendetta was showcased at the 1991 Las Vegas Amusement Expo.

== Controversy and censorship ==
Vendetta was censored and edited in some countries when released outside of the Asian market to remove an enemy character who dresses in leather and fights by grabbing hold of the playable character and then proceeding to dry hump and lick him; if there are two of these leather-clad enemies on the screen simultaneously, the other one will sometimes dry hump a light pole until the bulbs from it drop on his head, bludgeoning him. The character also continues to do the same if the protagonist is down on the floor, and a second type of dog enemy (a Dobermann) was also removed from the game for doing a similar action to the playable characters. These aspects of the game were heavily censored particularly in the United States, while the uncensored version was released in Japan, and other countries like Argentina and Brazil.

== Reception ==
In Japan, Game Machine listed Vendetta as the third most successful table arcade unit of July 1991. In North America, it was the top-grossing new video game on the RePlay arcade charts in September 1991.

British gaming magazine The One reviewed Vendetta in 1991, reviewing it alongside D.D. Crew, calling both "quite excellent" and stating that "one will probably fade into insignificance at the expense of the other. If it was up to me, Konami's Vendetta would be the one to take the prizes." The One states that Vendetta has "a lot more atmosphere" than D. D. Crew, and praises its graphics as being "moody, much more imaginatively drawn - and the animations are smooth and inventive", despite the game having smaller sprites. The review concludes with, "Vendetta has both class and imagination," and calls its gameplay "a cathartic experience".

Sinclair User magazine awarded it "Best Beat'Em Up Game" in 1991, along with Technōs Japan's WWF WrestleFest.

Damien McFerran of Nintendo Life gave the Arcade Archives version a 9/10 score, calling it one of the best beat 'em ups ever made with its deep gameplay.

In 2023, Time Extension listed the game as one of the best beat 'em ups of all time.
