= Arabian Fight =

1992 video game

- Japanese arcade flyer
- Developer: Sega AM2
- Publisher: Sega
- Producer: Yu Suzuki
- Platform: Arcade
- Release: JP: Late March 1992; NA: 1992
- Genre: Beat 'em up
- Modes: Single-player, multiplayer
- Arcade system: Sega System 32

Arabian Fight (Note: Japanese: アラビアンファイト) is a scrolling beat 'em up released as an arcade video game by Sega in 1992 (the displayed copyright year is 1991). Running on the Sega System 32 arcade system, the game uses pseudo-3D sprite-scaling graphics and supports cooperative multiplayer for up to four players.

== Gameplay ==
Gameplay screenshot

The gameplay is similar to many beat 'em up games of the generation, and to Sega's other side-scrolling beat 'em ups Golden Axe and Streets of Rage, using three action buttons, one to punch, one to kick and one for a special attack, in this case, magic based, similar to Golden Axe special attacks. Characters can also throw their opponents, and items can be collected from chests, as well as some enemies, to give extra points, restore health and grant the character their special attack. The game supports cooperative multiplayer for up to four players.

The game uses pseudo-3D sprite-scaling techniques to allow characters to move to the far back of the screen and give a feeling of perspective. The game also makes use of the foreground, something rarely done at this time, as characters perform special attacks very close to the screen, some so close that only their torso and head will fit; likewise enemies can jump from the foreground to fight (characters cannot be hit while in these animations). The backgrounds also utilize parallax scrolling effects.

There are seven stages in the game, set in various locations ranging from Arabia to India.

== Plot ==
The corrupt Sheikh Sazabiss has abducted Princess Lurana, and he is utilizing every unscrupulous means of power he has at his disposal to achieve his ultimate ambition of conquering the world. The quartet of valiant and fearless warriors bravely come face-to-face with Sazabiss. As they battle to save Lurana, the foursome, freely using magic, their most prized possession, journey to the castle of Sazabiss to save the princess and the planet.

== Characters ==
Four players may play at once with one of four selectable heroes: Sinbat (not a misspelling of "Sinbad"), Ramaya, Goldor or Datta. Sinbat is the game's young, handsome hero, Ramaya is the game's young, attractive female, Goldor is the game's muscle character, who appears to be older than Sinbat and Ramaya, and Datta is a spiritual-looking bald man.

== Reception ==
In Japan, Game Machine listed Arabian Fight on their May 1, 1992 issue as being the seventh most-successful table arcade unit of the month.

Kurt Kalata of Hardcore Gaming 101 criticized the gameplay for "mediocrity" but praised the graphics, stating "Arabian Fight might be the most technically ambitious 2D beat-em-up ever made" and said the game's background parallax effects were more advanced than Guardian Heroes (1996) for the Sega Saturn. He also compared it to Taito's Arabian Magic (1992), noting both have a similar Arabian Nights theme and four-player co-op.
