= Crime Fighters =

1989 video game

- North American arcade flyer
- Developer: Konami
- Publisher: Konami
- Designer: Shūjirō Hamakawa
- Programmers: Masato Ohsawa; Masahiro Inoue; Shiyu Rimoto
- Artists: Masaaki Kukino; Chiyoko Hanano; Shūjirō Hamakawa
- Composers: Mutsuhiko Izumi; Kenichi Matsubara
- Series: Crime Fighters
- Platform: Arcade
- Release: JP/NA: July 1989
- Genre: Beat 'em up
- Modes: Single-player, multiplayer

Crime Fighters (Note: Japanese: クライムファイターズ, Hepburn: Kuraimu Faitāzu) is a 1989 beat 'em up video game developed and published by Konami for arcades. It was released in Japan and North America in July 1989. The player takes control of an undercover police officer assigned to rescue a group of kidnapped women from a city's crime boss and his army of street punks. The game supports simultaneous multiplayer for up to four players in the North American version and up to two players in versions released internationally.

Crime Fighters is a side-scrolling brawler played across eight stages, in which players battle enemies with punches, kicks and grapples, and can arm themselves with weapons—including knives, lead pipes and handguns—taken from defeated enemies. The four-player version is also notable for replacing conventional lives with a credit-based health reserve, similar to Gauntlet, which slowly drains over time and is replenished by inserting more coins.

Although the game performed well in Japanese arcades on release, retrospective reviews have been largely negative, with criticism directed at its unreliable hit detection, stiff controls and slow pacing. Nevertheless, Crime Fighters served as the basis for Konami's future acclaimed beat 'em ups, such as Teenage Mutant Ninja Turtles, X-Men and The Simpsons. A sequel, Vendetta (released in Japan as Crime Fighters 2), followed in 1991. Hamster Corporation re-released the game as part of its Arcade Archives series for the Nintendo Switch and PlayStation 4 in March 2021.

== Plot ==
A number of young women have gone missing across the city, and the local crime kingpin—described in-game as "a fat toad"—is the prime suspect behind the kidnappings. Players take on the role of undercover police officers who must infiltrate the crime gang's base and rescue the captured women, fighting through every punk and criminal who stands in their way. The four playable officers are unnamed and virtually identical in both appearance and abilities, differing only in the color of their pants, hair and skin.

== Gameplay ==
Crime Fighters is a side-scrolling beat 'em up spanning eight stages, the first of which is set in a subway. Upon knocking down the first few enemies, a large icon instructs the player to kick downed opponents, an attack that deals extra damage to enemies lying on the ground. Compared to Konami's faster-paced Teenage Mutant Ninja Turtles arcade game, released the same year, its pacing is slower and more methodical, a style Hardcore Gaming 101 likened to Double Dragon.

There are buttons to punch and kick; pressing both simultaneously performs stronger attacks such as a spinning jump kick and a flying knee. It is also possible to grab enemies and attack them with moves such as a knee to the face, as well as kick them in the groin to stun them, an attack punctuated by a comedic "ding" sound effect. Many enemies are armed, using knives, lead pipes and handguns against the player. Upon killing these enemies a player may pick up their weapon and use it indefinitely—unusual for the genre at the time, the game even allows players to pick up and use firearms (including handguns in the two-player versions); however, if players are hit once, they will drop the item and it will disappear (except for the handguns in the four-player versions, provided that they still have ammunition).

In the four-player versions, each player position has its own coin slot and each credit value adds around a hundred health points to that position which slowly drains one health point per tick (similar to Gauntlet). Players are able to accidentally hit each other and cause allies to drop their weapons permanently. After defeating the boss at the end of each level, if the game has more than one current player then the players are given a time limit that refreshes when a player is hurt and tells the players to fight as long as they want and lose health. While some health is granted at the end of the time limit, it is possible to lose more health than granted during this fight. The two-player version gives players a set number of lives and the health/timer system is replaced with a life meter and life counter similar to other beat 'em ups.

In the final stage, the final boss—the crime boss himself—throws a key to the players and tells them to pick it up. Doing so will allow the boss to pull out a machine gun and shoot at the players. Should the player run out of health at this point, the game will end and a bad ending will be seen with the final boss telling the players to try again. The player however can choose not to get the key and kick (or shoot if the player has a handgun) the main villain repeatedly until he is defeated. Upon winning the game, the player will then be subjected to a difficult final all-boss round where they must defeat every boss in the game, who all appear on screen at once. If all the bosses are beaten, the game will either end or repeat endlessly.

== Development and release ==
Crime Fighters was developed and published by Konami, with Shūjirō Hamakawa credited as designer, Masaaki Kukino, Chiyoko Hanano and Hamakawa handling the art, and music composed by Mutsuhiko Izumi and Kenichi Matsubara. Reflecting on the game in a 2023 interview with Time Extension, Kukino said he designed the game and drew all of its characters, basing them on his knowledge of movie scenes and characters, and recalled being especially satisfied with the stage bosses, each of which was given its own personality. He described his design goal as creating a fun beat 'em up that four people could play together, with realistic battles that emphasized enemy characters' unique characteristics, citing examples such as kicking defeated enemies and finishing them off with a gun. Kukino named Crime Fighters his favorite of Konami's beat 'em ups, saying the project taught him how fun it is to create games.

Programmer Masahiro Inoue, who programmed all of the enemy characters, attributed the game's comedic elements to himself—citing the "licking" posters and the enemy dogs that break off their attack to enthusiastically hump the player's leg. Although the character sprites were drawn by the character designers, the on-screen timing of each animation was adjusted by the programmers, while the animation of the player character was created by a developer credited as "C. Lee".

The game was released in Japanese and North American arcades in July 1989. Two versions of the game were produced: a four-player version released in North America, in which each player position has a dedicated coin slot feeding an individual health reserve, and a two-player version released elsewhere that instead uses a traditional health bar and lives system.

In March 2021, Hamster Corporation released a home version of the game as part of its Arcade Archives series for the Nintendo Switch and PlayStation 4, priced at US$7.99 / €6.99 / £6.29.

== Reception ==
=== Contemporary ===
In Japan, Game Machine listed Crime Fighters in its August 1, 1989 issue as being the third most-successful table arcade unit at the time.

=== Retrospective ===
Retrospective assessments have been mixed to negative. Hardcore Gaming 101 characterized the game as "a dull, dull brawler", criticizing its unreliable hit detection—in which attacks that appear to connect pass harmlessly through enemies—as well as its steep difficulty, with crowds of enemies able to surround the player and repeatedly knock them down, slowly whittling away their health. The site also judged its graphics outdated even by 1989 standards, though it praised the game's goofy sense of humor, such as moments where falling objects cartoonishly squish the player character, and jokingly called the groin-kick attack "the best part of the entire game". Retro Gamer likewise praised the game's sound design, but criticized its poor controls and hit detection.

== Legacy ==
Despite its poor critical standing, Crime Fighters is regarded as the foundation of Konami's celebrated line of arcade beat 'em ups, serving as the basis for later titles such as Teenage Mutant Ninja Turtles (1989), The Simpsons (1991) and X-Men (1992).

It was followed by a sequel titled Vendetta (released in Japan as Crime Fighters 2) in 1991. Hardcore Gaming 101 described the sequel as "a massive improvement in every conceivable way" over the original, calling it "a pretty fine beat-em-up".

== See also ==
- Vendetta (1991 video game) – the game's sequel
