= Guardians (video game) =

1995 video game

Guardians Denjin Makai II
- Arcade flyer
- Developer: Winkysoft
- Publisher: Banpresto
- Series: Denjin Makai
- Platform: Arcade
- Release: 1995
- Genre: Beat 'em up
- Modes: Single-player, multiplayer

Guardians (ガーディアンズ), released internationally as Denjin Makai II (電神魔傀II), is a side-scrolling beat 'em up developed by Winkysoft and published by Banpresto that was exclusively released as a coin-operated arcade game in 1995 as the sequel to the 1994 arcade game Denjin Makai.

== Gameplay ==
Guardians can be played by up to two players simultaneously. Health gauges are displayed for both player and enemy characters, while energy bars are displayed for special moves.

The controls for Guardians consist of an eight-way joystick and two buttons for attacking and jumping respectively. Pressing the attack button repeatedly when attacking an enemy or multiple enemies will cause the player character to perform a combo. The final blow of the combo can be changed to a throw if the player moves the joystick in the opposite direction just before landing it. The player also can perform a jump attack. When two players play, they can perform team-based special moves.

Enemies can be grabbed simply by walking into one of them. When an enemy is grabbed, the player can perform a grab attack by pressing the attack button or perform a throw by tilting the joystick left or right. A thrown enemy can be tossed at another for additional damage. Items such as weapons, health recovery items, and items awarding extra points can be picked up by standing over one and pressing the attack button. Weapons have limited uses and will disappear if the player is disarmed by an enemy too much or when the player moves to a new area.

== Reception ==
In 2023, Time Extension included the game on their top 25 "Best Beat 'Em Ups of All Time" list.
