= Flashgal =

1985 Video game

- Japanese arcade flyer
- Developer: Kyugo
- Publishers: JP: Sega; NA: Romstar
- Platform: Arcade
- Release: JP: November 1985; NA: Late 1985
- Genres: Action, beat 'em up, scrolling shooter
- Mode: Single-player

Flashgal (Note: Japanese: フラッシュギャル, Hepburn: Furasshugyaru) is a beat 'em up action game developed by Kyugo and released for arcades in 1985, by Sega in Japan and Romstar in North America. The game has a mixture of unarmed fighting and shooting gameplay.

== Information ==
The game was released in 1985 as a side-scrolling action game with a mixture of beat 'em up and platform gameplay. Flashgal has a horizontal orientation with a standard resolution. It also is a color game. It allows a multiplayer of two players to play at once. It includes an 8 way joystick. The sound is amplified mono with one channel. It stands upright and vertical for the cabinet style. Flashgal is controlled by the player who controls when she kicks, punches, and jumps to move through the various levels.

According to Retro Gamer, the game is a superhero beat 'em up that "takes a lot of its inspiration from" Kung-Fu Master (1984). It is a single-plane brawler that distinguishes its gameplay with the use of auto-scrolling. It also has a female protagonist, who bears a resemblance to superheroines such as Wonder Woman and Elektra. She also resembles Blaze Fielding from Sega's Streets of Rage series. Coincidentally, this game also features a crime boss with firearms, jetpackers, ninjas, and a motorcycle level that was cut from the third game due to time constraints.

== See also ==
- My Hero (video game)
