= Denjin Makai =

1994 video game

Denjinmakai
- Arcade flyer by Go Nagai
- Developer: Winkysoft
- Publisher: Banpresto
- Composer: Noboru Yamane
- Series: Denjin Makai
- Platforms: Arcade, Super Famicom
- Release: Arcade: WW: February 1, 1994; SFC: JP: September 23, 1994
- Modes: Single-player, multiplayer

Denjinmakai (電神魔傀), or Denjin Makai, is a 1994 side-scrolling beat 'em up developed by Winkysoft and published by Banpresto that was originally released as a coin-operated arcade game. It was later ported to the Super Famicom (known as the Super Nintendo Entertainment System in other countries) under the title Ghost Chaser Densei (ゴーストチェイサー電精). The Super Famicom release is Japan-only. A sequel, Guardians, was released in 1995.

== Gameplay ==
Denjinmakai can be played by up to two players simultaneously. Health gauges are displayed for both player and enemy characters, while energy bars are displayed for special moves.

The controls consist of an eight-way joystick and two buttons for attacking and jumping respectively. Pressing the attack button repeatedly when attacking an enemy or multiple enemies will cause the player character to perform a combo. The final blow of the combo can be changed to a throw if the player moves the joystick in the opposite direction just before landing it. The player also can perform a jump attack. When two players play, they can perform team-based special moves.

Enemies can be grabbed simply by walking into one of them. When an enemy is grabbed, the player can perform a grab attack by pressing the attack button or perform a throw by tilting the joystick left or right. A thrown enemy can be tossed at another for additional damage. Items such as weapons, health recovery items, and items awarding extra points can be picked up by standing over one and pressing the attack button. Weapons have limited uses and will disappear if the player is disarmed by an enemy too much or when the player moves to a new area.

In the home version, only three (Makai, Iyo, and Belva) out of the six characters are playable, and the other three (Kurokishi, Zeldia, and Tulks) were turned into bosses; one stage was also removed.

== Plot ==
In the year 2079, there is a country in the far east where a super computer controls all of the information in its cities, and crimestopping was supposed to be perfect, but the criminals who can not be found by the control system, called Ghosts, have infiltrated the country. The government has set up a special police organization, Ghost Chaser, to stop Ghost terrorists.

== Release ==
Denjinmakai was released with the title Ghost Chaser Densei for the Super Famicom home console on September 23, 1994 and was published by Banpresto. In 1995, the game received a sequel, Guardians (ガーディアンズ), also known as Denjinmakai II (電神魔傀II). In 2017 the game was fan translated into English.

== Reception ==
Reception

Review scores
Publication	Score
Famitsu	23/40
Joypad	72%
PlayStation Magazine (JP)	19.7/30

French magazine Joypad gave Ghost Chaser for the Super Famicom a review score of 72%. Kurt Kalata of Hardcore Gaming 101 called the home version of the game "playable", but a weak port.
