= D. D. Crew =

1991 video game

- Japanese arcade flyer
- Developer: Sega AM3
- Publisher: Sega
- Platform: Arcade
- Release: June 1991
- Genre: Beat 'em up
- Modes: Single-player, multiplayer
- Arcade system: Sega System 18

D. D. Crew (Ｄ. Ｄ. クルー) is a 1991 beat 'em up video game developed and published by Sega for arcades.

== Gameplay ==
D. D. Crew is similar to Capcom's Final Fight, an archetypal side-scrolling beat 'em up game. Up to four player characters move from left to right through each level (most of which are split into 3 or more scenes), fighting with the enemy characters who appear, until they reach a confrontation with a stronger boss character at the end of the level. Once that boss is beaten, the players automatically move on to the next stage. Enemies appear from both sides of the screen and from out of doorways or entrances set into the background, and the player(s) must defeat all of them to progress. If the players try to simply travel through the levels without fighting, the screen will stop scrolling until all current enemies have been defeated, before allowing the players to continue progress. Enemies may move outside the confines of the screen, but players may not. Players will pick up a few weapons along the way, like knives and grenades, as well as other items like some lives and "MAX" health points. Players also can pick up and toss enemies either toward the ground or against other enemies. One unique feature is a counter that tells how many enemies a player knocked out. Another unique feature is that players also can perform dash attacks by pressing the joystick toward the left or right sides twice, while pressing the attack button during dashing.

== Reception ==
In Japan, Game Machine listed D.D. Crew on their September 1, 1991 issue as being the sixth most-successful table arcade unit of the month.

British gaming magazine The One reviewed D.D. Crew in 1991, reviewing it alongside Vendetta, stating that "one will probably fade into insignificance at the expense of the other. If it was up to me, Konami's Vendetta would be the one to take the prizes." The One praises D.D. Crew's sprite size and "well-crafted" graphics, however, they call the gameplay "fine" but "all a bit sterile", stating that Vendetta has "a lot more atmosphere", and the graphics, while smaller, are "much more imaginatively drawn - and the animations are smooth and inventive".

Sinclair User gave D.D. Crew an overall score of 71%, complimenting the game's graphics and stating that overall the game was "nicely done" but that it "never quite captures the imagination". They also recommended Vendetta from Konami instead.
