= Dungeon Magic =

1994 video game

- Arcade flyer
- Developer: Taito
- Publisher: Taito
- Director: Hiroyuki Maekawa
- Designers: Hiroyuki Maekawa; Turtle Mizukami; Mucha
- Programmers: Takahiro Natani; Hiroyuki Tanaka; Takafumi Kaneko; Toshiyuki Hayashi; Kunio Kuzukawa
- Artists: Noritaka Kawamoto; Kouichiro Yonemura
- Composer: Norihiro Furukawa
- Platform: Arcade
- Release: 1994
- Genre: Beat'em up
- Modes: Single-player, multiplayer
- Arcade system: Taito F3 System

Dungeon Magic, known as Light Bringer (ライトブリンガー) in Japan and Europe, is a video game released in arcades by Taito in 1994. The game is a beat 'em up with an isometric perspective and includes some platform gameplay. Blood and gore can be adjusted through a setting.

There are two European versions of the game: one uses the title Light Bringer, and the other Dungeon Magic. While sharing a name with Taito's earlier NES cartridge Dungeon Magic: Sword of the Elements, the two games are otherwise unrelated.

The game was re-released in the Taito Legends 2 collection.

== Plot ==
An evil magician has brought an evil spirit back to life and is plotting to seize control of the kingdom, and has kidnapped the princess for use as a sacrifice. Four warriors venture into the world of magic to save the princess of the kingdom from the wicked magician: Ash the knight, Gren the roving warrior, Cisty the elf, whose whole family was destroyed by the evil spirit in the past, and the old magician Vold with the magic staff must now set off to save the princess.

== Gameplay ==
In this game, up to four players can choose from four different characters: a knight, a martial artist, an elven archer and a wizard.

Consumable items: Collecting treasure gives experience points, and gaining levels slightly increases combo damage and shortens the charging time to perform a super attack (which is done by holding the attack button until the character glows yellow). Consuming food and drink items restores health, and picking up mice increases the chance to unleash a critical hit. Lastly, characters can pick up magical spheres which increase their ability to use their desperation attack.

Weapons and shields: There are three different elemental weapons (fire, ice and lightning) that deal increased damage against certain enemy types (for instance, fire weapons do extra damage against orc-type enemies). The starting weapon and the secret "power" weapon do not deal elemental damage but instead can inflict critical hits randomly; the "power weapon" increases damage and has a higher critical rate. Characters can also pick up and use single-use projectile weapons such as spears and throwing axes; the crossbow is unique in that it can be fired five times. There are five different shields that allow players to completely negate enemy attacks before breaking.

Items, weapons and shields can be found in barrels, crates, and treasure chests. However, players must be cautious to avoid traps, of which there are various kinds.

The enemies in the game are fairly standard for a fantasy-them game, including orcs, slimes, lizardmen, werewolves, carnivorous plants, harpies, and others. Bosses (known as Roomguarders) include demons, giant snakes, a spider-woman, and more. The game also features numerous branching paths that present different rooms and secret areas, but each path must be cleared against a time limit. If the player dawdles in an area too long, then ghosts will eventually appear and swarm the player as punishment. Players must play through the game multiple times to see all of the rooms available.

=== Characters ===
- Ash has many weaknesses compared to few strengths. Some of his weaknesses are a slow attack speed and a vulnerable special attack that has a very limited usage. His strengths are high combo damage (although his means of achieving it are not as effective as the other characters) and the most useful throw in the game. His desperation attack has a long duration, but its effectiveness is negated by low damage and its knockdown feature on all creatures but the giant serpents (which put together lower its damage potential, except against the serpents). Furthermore, his dashing attack does not knock down on hit, leaving Ash without a single reliable attack that knocks down enemies. Ash is best used by experienced players looking for a challenge. Elemental swords affect Ash's combo, dashing attack, and special attack. The Jewel Star increases damage on the aforementioned attacks. Ash will blink white when his critical attack is triggered.
- Gren is a balanced and powerful character. His special attack is useful, and benefits greatly from the decreased charging time from high experience levels, but it does not deal elemental damage. His combo attack can deal elemental damage, and is quick and excellent for performing infinite combos when stopped before the final attack; on the other hand, the final attack has a very high chance of unleashing a critical hit, especially with the Bare Knuckle gauntlets, for massive damage. Most importantly, Gren has the best dashing attack in the game; it hits multiple times, deals high damage, has excellent priority, and can deal elemental damage. Overall, Gren has no weaknesses and performs well throughout the entire game, and can even rival Vold once he gains the Bare Knuckle gauntlets. Elemental gauntlets affect Gren's combo and dashing attack. The Bare Knuckle increases damage on the aforementioned attacks. Gren's attack will unleash blue flames when his critical attack is triggered; he can critical hit with his combo and dashing attack.
- Cisty is a prominently long range fighter who also performs well in other areas. Her combo, as with Ash, is slow to come out but is effective when it fully connects; both Ash and Cisty have slow and risky infinite combos, and thus may have more problems against certain bosses. Furthermore, Cisty's combo does not benefit from elemental damage and does not get enhanced damage with her "power" weapon. Cisty's bomb attack can potentially hit every enemy on screen, but is very inconsistent and leaves her vulnerable afterward. Her throw is especially dangerous to use as it leaves her widely vulnerable. Cisty's strength lies in her ranged special attack which allows her to safely pick off enemies before they can reach her; however, the attack does not hit multiple enemies, unless they overlap, and thus must be used in conjunction with her slide attack to keep enemies at range. Her biggest weakness is against enemies that are too low or short to hit with arrows, such as the giant serpent, the toad enemies, and the wolf enemies. Overall, Cisty is a much improved Ash as she is superior in most aspects, but many of her moves leave her vulnerable. Elemental bows only affect Cisty's arrow attack. The Strong Bow only increases the damage of her arrow attacks. Cisty's critical ability is different from the rest of the cast; it ONLY affects her special (NOT super) attack - it allows her to randomly fire off a super attack when using a normal special attack.
- Vold is the most powerful character in the game. His bomb attack is the most effective, covering excellent range, doing excellent damage, and being able to hit enemies twice due to its long duration. Vold alone has unique special attacks for each elemental weapon: some, such as the fire, ice, and holy staff, are much better than the others. The holy staff is the ultimate weapon in the game, allowing the powerful Vold to become nigh unstoppable. Due to his immensely overpowered special attacks, Vold is the easiest character to beat the game with. Vold's only weakness is his throw. His low combo damage is negated by the fact that he is the easiest character to perform infinite combos with, as his first combo attack has the least startup and lag. Vold is the most effective character in the game whether he is used by beginners or experts alike.

== Reception ==
In Japan, Game Machine listed Dungeon Magic on their April 15, 1994 issue as being the seventh most-successful table arcade unit of the month.
