= Gang Wars (video game) =

1989 video game

- Japanese arcade flyer of Gang Wars. Notice that Jackie (left) resembles Jackie Chan.
- Developer: Alpha Denshi
- Publishers: JP: SNK; NA: SNK
- Designers: Tsutomu Maruyama (producer, director, designer)
- Composers: Yuka Watanabe; Hiroaki Shimizu
- Platforms: Arcade, PlayStation Network
- Release: July 1989
- Genre: 2D Beat 'em up
- Modes: Single-player, multiplayer

Gang Wars (ギャングウォーズ) is a 1989 2D beat 'em up arcade game developed by Alpha Denshi and published by SNK.

== Plot ==
The setting takes place in New York City, following martial artists Mike and Jackie, who heard an evil gang led by the antagonist, Jaguar, are terrorizing the city. Jaguar also kidnapped a young woman named Cynthia. Mike and Jackie must fight through parts of New York City (including Chinatown, Manhattan) to return peace to New York City, and defeat Jaguar to save Cynthia.

== Gameplay ==
Gameplay screenshot

In Gang Wars, up to two players can control two different characters with different fighting styles. The movements are composed of two attack types—punch and kick—to fight against enemies, plus jumping to overcome obstacles. Players have access to a repertoire of techniques by pushing these buttons individually or in combination. The characters can also pick up weapons for hitting, throwing projectiles and firearms. At the end of each stage the players can customise the characters' three fighting statistics (Power, Speed and Guard) depending on the number of points they have. Higher-end stage scores grant more customisation points.

== Reception ==
In Japan, Game Machine listed Gang Wars on their July 15, 1989, issue as being the third-most-successful table arcade unit of the month, outperforming titles like Golden Axe.

== See also ==
- Ninja Combat
- Ninja Commando
