= Fight'N Rage =

2017 video game

- Developers: SebaGamesDev; BlitWorks (console ports)
- Publishers: SebaGamesDev; BlitWorks (console ports)
- Producer: Sebastián García
- Designer: Sebastián García
- Programmer: Sebastián García
- Artist: Sebastián García
- Composer: Gonzalo Varela
- Platforms: Nintendo Switch; PlayStation 4; PlayStation 5; Windows; Xbox One; Xbox Series X
- Release: PC; September 19, 2017; NS; September 26, 2019; XONE; September 27, 2019; PS4; December 3, 2019; PS5; February 28, 2023; XBSX; March 1, 2023
- Genre: Beat 'em up
- Modes: Single-player, multiplayer

Fight'N Rage is a side-scrolling beat 'em up game developed and published by SebaGamesDev. It was released for Windows in 2017, and received subsequent ports for the Nintendo Switch, PlayStation 4, PlayStation 5, Xbox One, and Xbox Series X. The game received generally positive reviews, and is frequently cited as one of the best beat 'em ups of recent years.

== Gameplay ==
Fight'N Rage is a side-scrolling beat 'em up in which up to three players locally fight against waves of enemies, aided by disposable weapons and item pickups. Alongside standard attacks, throws, and dashing attacks, each player character has a set of special attacks that can be performed at the cost of some health. Alternatively, players have a meter that fills with time and allows them to use a special move free of cost. Reminiscent of the fighting game genre, the game features unusually fluid controls for a beat 'em up, enabling the player to rapidly move about the screen and string together enormous combo attacks. Also inspired by fighting games, the game features a parry mechanic that enables the player to not only deflect an incoming attack, but instantly refill their special attack meter.

The main gameplay mode, Arcade Mode, sees players going through a series of levels as the story is told, with several branching pathways enabling the player to experience a different sequence of levels and one of eight possible endings. Set in a fictional world where humans are locked in bitter war with mutants - a race of anthropomorphic animals - the game features three playable characters seeking to confront and defeat the mutant rebellion's evil leader. Players have a limited number of lives, but they can earn more by earning a certain number of points. If all players lose all of their lives, they will have to retry the segment where they died from the beginning. Players receive points based on their performance, which are converted to coins on game over or completing the game. Coins can be spent to purchase numerous unlockable outfits and game modes. The game also tracks, stores, and displays speedrunning statistics for your given route and character selection.

The game features six difficulty levels and numerous alternative game modes. Training Mode offers a set of tutorials teaching the player how to perform various moves, combos, and advanced techniques. Practice Mode enables the player to select and play any stage they've previously encountered. Battle Mode allows the player to fight one-on-one against a human or CPU opponent. Time Attack presents the player with a set of enemies, and grades them on how quickly they defeat them. In Score Attack, the player attempts to score as many points as possible within a time limit. In Survival Mode, the player encounters waves of enemies, and is graded on how many waves they survive.

The game features three main playable characters: a female martial artist named Gal, a male ninja named F.Norris, and a minotaur named Ricardo. All three have extremely distinct movesets, with Gal and F.Norris favoring fast-paced combat and huge combos, while Ricardo employs more of a brute strength wrestling style. As an unlockable feature, the game also allows the player to control basically any enemy in the game, albeit these characters have narrower movesets than the main cast. Enemy characters can be used in most of the secondary game modes, or in Arcade Mode by entering a secret code.

== Development ==
Fight'N Rage was developed by SebaGamesDev - essentially a one-man development team consisting of Sebastián García. It is SebaGameDev's first (and to date only) published game, and García performed basically all aspects of its development except for the soundtrack (composed by Gonzalo Varela) and playtesting.

In an interview for Game Developer, García described the game's development history in detail: García began his first job in the video game industry in 2005 as a pixel artist for Uruguayan game developer Batoví Games. During that time, he built simple game prototypes and learned to program in Java, ActionScript, C#, and XNA.

He also worked on two beat 'em up prototypes: "Master Ninja Fighter" (independently) and "Super Vampire Ninja Zero" (with two of his colleagues). These projects were important stepping stones in developing Fight'N Rage, and the prototypes contained many aspects that García would refine in his later game, including the graphical style and combo- and parry-heavy gameplay.

Years later, García left Batoví to develop games independently, living with the support of his significant other, Giselle. After first working on and abandoning a game called "Dreamnesia", García shifted his focus to Fight'N Rage. During his time developing Fight'N Rage, García said that the couple endured considerable hardship, but that he did not give up when developing it.

The game contains many noticeable callbacks to classic beat 'em ups and fighting games, both in terms of gameplay and presentation, taking inspiration from the games of the genre released in the 1980s and 90s.

Regarding the game's challenge, he stated that the "goal was to offer the experience that I usually enjoy in video games, I like when the player has to constantly evaluate what is the best decision to take… while considering risks and rewards based on his own skills".

=== Music ===
The game's soundtrack consists of over 40 songs, composed entirely by Gonzalo Varela. The music spans a diverse range of genres, fitting the various setting and scenarios in the game. The soundtrack is also available for separate purchase on Steam.

García first recruited Varela to work with him on "Dreamnesia", which he eventually abandoned due to "feature creep", but he continued to work with Varela on the new soundtrack.

As a point of reference, García said he sent Varela samples of songs he liked from various other fighting games and beat em ups. Typical of those games, Varela composed a large amount of "rock and instrumental metal" for Fight'N Rage, but García said that in order to give "a break between the more intense tracks", the soundtrack also contains numerous "elements of jazz, funk, flamenco, Latin American music, experimental and classical music".

To aid Varela's composition, García provided him a script to "load the game at a certain point and thus test how the different music pieces fitted [sic] while playing the game itself".

== Release ==
The game was released for Windows on September 19, 2017. Subsequent home console releases included the Nintendo Switch PlayStation 4, PlayStation 5, Xbox One, and Xbox Series X. These console ports were handled by BlitWorks.

== Reception ==
Reception

Aggregate score
Aggregator	Score
Metacritic	NS: 79/100; PC: TBD; PS4: 83/100; PS5: 81/100; XONE: 76/100; XBSX: 80/100

Fight'N Rage received "generally favorable" reviews, according to review aggregator Metacritic. Joel Couture of CGMagazine wrote that "Fight'N Rage easily deserves a spot alongside Streets of Rage, Double Dragon, and Final Fight, offering extremely satisfying action, sharp foes, deep movesets, solid music, and delightful punches". Regarding the Switch port, PJ O'Reilly of Nintendolife wrote that "its surprisingly deep and satisfyingly weighty combat engine combined with three strong and varied player characters and a host of cleverly-designed enemies elevate it above the usual button-mashing experience perhaps expected of entries in this genre".
