= Kung-Fu Master (video game) =

1984 video game

- North American arcade flyer
- Developer: Irem (Note: NES version developed by Nintendo R&D4.)
- Publishers: Irem: Arcade; JP/EU: Irem; NA: Data East NES; Nintendo; Apple II; Data East; C64; NA: Data East; EU: U.S. Gold 7800; Absolute Entertainment; Game Boy; JP/NA: Irem; EU: Nintendo
- Directors: Takashi Nishiyama (arcade); Shigeru Miyamoto (NES)
- Producer: Scott Tsumura
- Designers: Takashi Nishiyama (arcade); Shigeru Miyamoto (NES)
- Composers: Masato Ishizaki (arcade); Koji Kondo (NES)
- Platform: Arcade: NES, Amstrad CPC, Apple II, Commodore 64, Atari 2600, MSX, ZX Spectrum, Atari 7800, Game Boy
- Release: December 1984: Arcade; JP: December 1984; NA: March 1985; EU: Early 1985; NES; JP: June 21, 1985; NA: October 18, 1985; EU: 1987; Apple II; NA: November 1985; C64; NA: November 1985; EU: 1986; 2600; May 12, 1987; 7800; 1989; Game Boy; JP: December 11, 1990; NA: February 1991; EU: 1991
- Genre: Beat 'em up
- Modes: Single-player, multiplayer

Kung-Fu Master, known as Spartan X (Note: Japanese: スパルタンX, Hepburn: Suparutan X) in Japan, is a 1984 beat 'em up game developed and published by Irem for arcades. It was distributed by Data East in North America. Designed by Takashi Nishiyama, the game was based on Hong Kong martial arts films. It is a loose adaptation of the Jackie Chan, Sammo Hung and Yuen Biao film Wheels on Meals (1984), called Spartan X in Japan. The protagonist Thomas is named after Jackie Chan's character in the film. It is also heavily inspired by the Bruce Lee film Game of Death (1972), which was the basis for the game's concept. Nishiyama, who had previously designed the side-scrolling shooter Moon Patrol (1982), combined fighting elements with a shoot 'em up gameplay rhythm. Irem and Data East exported the game to the West without the Spartan X license.

The game was a major commercial success, topping the Japanese arcade charts and becoming America's second highest-grossing arcade game of 1985, while receiving critical acclaim for its fast-paced, side-scrolling gameplay and detailed, colorful graphics. A port for the Nintendo Entertainment System (known as the Famicom in Japan) was developed by Nintendo under the direction of Shigeru Miyamoto, released as Spartan X in Japan and Kung Fu in the West, selling 3.5 million copies worldwide. It was also one of the top five best-selling Commodore 64 games of 1986. It spawned the sequel Spartan X 2 (1991) and the spiritual successors Trojan (1986) and Vigilante (1988).

Kung-Fu Master was a highly influential game. It is regarded as the first beat 'em up video game, and an early example of the side-scrolling character action game genre, which became popular during the mid-to-late 1980s. Miyamoto's work on the NES port inspired his development of the side-scrolling platformer Super Mario Bros. (1985), while Nishiyama was hired by Capcom where he used the boss battles as the basis for the fighting game Street Fighter (1987). He later worked for SNK on fighting games such as Fatal Fury and The King of Fighters. Kung-Fu Master also influenced other media, such as the Red Ribbon Army saga (1985–1986) of the manga and anime series Dragon Ball, as well as the French film Kung Fu Master (1988).

== Gameplay ==
Thomas (wearing white) in the first level of the arcade original

The player controls Thomas with an eight-way joystick and two attack buttons to punch and kick. Unlike more conventional side-scrolling games, the joystick is used not only to crouch, but also to jump. Punches and kicks can be performed from a standing, crouching or jumping position. Punches award more points than kicks and do more damage, but their range is shorter. Thomas has a health meter indicating how much damage he can take. He can absorb a significant amount of damage, but loses a life if he takes too many hits.

Underlings encountered by the player include Grippers, who can grab Thomas and drain his energy until shaken off; Knife Throwers, who can throw at two different heights and must be hit twice; and Tom Toms, short fighters who can either grab Thomas or somersault to strike his head when he is crouching. On even-numbered floors, the player must also deal with falling balls and pots, snakes, poisonous moths, fire-breathing dragons, and exploding confetti.

The Devil's Temple has five floors, each ending with a different boss (described as "sons of the devil" at the start of the game). Each boss has a health meter like Thomas, which leads to the game temporarily becoming a one-on-one fighting game during a boss battle. In order to complete a floor, Thomas must connect enough strikes to completely drain the boss's energy meter; he can then climb the stairs to the next floor. Thomas has a fixed time limit to complete each floor. If time runs out or his meter is completely drained, the player loses one life and must replay the entire floor. Upon completing a floor, the player receives bonus points for remaining time and energy.

The bosses of the first four levels are Stick Fighter, Boomerang Fighter, Giant, and Black Magician. The boss of the fifth floor is Mr. X, the leader of the gang that kidnapped Sylvia. Once he is defeated, Thomas rescues Sylvia and the game restarts at a higher difficulty level.

One extra life is granted at 50,000 points. The game ends when all lives are lost.

== Plot ==
The player controls Thomas, a kung fu master who dons a sleeveless white keikogi, he one day notices that his lover is missing in action and is only left a mysterious letter that reads: "Your love Sylvia is in custody now. If you want to save your dear Sylvia's life. Come to the Devil's Temple at once. 5 sons of the Devil will entertain you."

As Thomas rushes to the rescue, he punches and kicks his way through the five levels of the pagoda called the Devil's Temple to save his girlfriend Sylvia from the five floor guardians, especially the crime boss who only goes by the codename "Mr. X".

As Thomas ascends the tower, he must fight and knock down many enemies off the tower along the way and five end-of-level boss battles, a concept inspired by Game of Death. Thomas and each boss have a health meter, and the game temporarily becomes a one-on-one fighting game during boss battles.

== Development ==
The game was designed for Irem by Takashi Nishiyama. Kung-Fu Master is based on Hong Kong martial arts films. It is a loose adaptation of the Jackie Chan, Sammo Hung and Yuen Biao film Wheels on Meals (1984), called Spartan X in Japan, specifically the final part that involves Thomas (Jackie Chan) climbing a Spanish castle to rescue Sylvia (Lola Forner), with the help of Moby (Sammo Hung) and his cousin David (Yuen Biao). The game also borrows from Bruce Lee's 1972 film Game of Death, with the five-level Devil's Temple reflecting the movie's setting of a five-level pagoda and a martial arts master in each level. In contrast, Wheels on Meals takes place in Spain as opposed to the game's East Asian setting. The final part of Wheels on Meals had borrowed its concept of climbing an enemy base by fighting enemies along the way from Game of Death. The game was also influenced by the Bruce Lee film Enter the Dragon (1973).

Nishiyama had previously created Irem's 1982 arcade side-scrolling shooter game Moon Patrol. Nishiyama designed Kung-Fu Master by combining a shoot 'em up gameplay rhythm with fighting elements.

The music and sound for the arcade game were composed by Masato Ishizaki. Nishiyama initially believed the game did not need any music, as it was a martial arts game and he thought it would sound more impressive to just have the sound effects. Ishizaki had a melody in mind for the game, leading him to suggest that two versions be made, with and without the music, and asked to see which sounded better. After hearing both versions, Nishiyama agreed that the music version sounded better and included Ishizaki's melody in the game.

Prior to the game's development, Nishiyama was invited to join Capcom by its founder Kenzo Tsujimoto in 1983, after he had left Irem. Nishiyama decided to remain in Irem up until the development of Spartan X. He eventually decided to leave Irem and join Capcom before the game was complete. Ishizaki later went on to compose the music and sound for R-Type (1987).

== Release ==
The arcade game was originally released as Spartan X in Japan on November 24, 1984. It was then released internationally as Kung-Fu Master in North America in March 1985 and in Europe in early 1985.

== Ports ==
In June 1985, the game was released for the Family Computer in Japan. It was released as Spartan X in Japan, before releasing internationally as Kung Fu for the Nintendo Entertainment System in North America and PAL regions. The game was converted and published by Nintendo and designed and directed by Shigeru Miyamoto. He was interested in the project because of the side-scrolling action gameplay, which was something he had in mind for the platformer genre. He wanted to gain experience developing side-scrolling games with Excitebike (1984) and Kung Fu. Koji Kondo designed the sound effects for the Famicom port.

The game was converted to the Atari 2600 by Dan Kitchen, shortly after developing the 2600 version of Ghostbusters (1984). This version of Kung-Fu Master is considered a significant programming feat considering the technical limitations of the Atari 2600.

Kung-Fu Master was also converted to the Atari 7800, Amstrad CPC, Apple II, Commodore 64, MSX (Irem/ASCII version as Seiken Achō), PlayChoice-10 (arcade, nearly the same as the NES version), and ZX Spectrum.

== Reception ==
Reception

Review scores
Publication	Score				
Publication	Arcade	Atari 2600	C64	NES	ZX
AllGame	4.5/5	3.5/5	3/5	2.5/5	
Computer and Video Games	Positive	54%		9/10	
Génération 4				80%	
Your Sinclair					30%
Zzap!64			79%		
Commodore User			4/5		
Computer Gamer	Positive				
Play Meter	8/10				
The Video Games Guide	5/5				
Top Score				3.5/4	

=== Arcade ===
In Japan, the Game Machine arcade charts listed Spartan X as the top-grossing table arcade cabinet for two months in early 1985, from January 15 through February 1985. It regained popularity in Japanese arcades following the release of the Famicom port later that year. In Europe, it was a major arcade hit in 1985.

In North America, it was a major hit in arcades, reaching number one on the US arcade earnings charts upon release, and selling 5,000 arcade cabinets by April 1985. It was later the second top-grossing upright arcade cabinet on the RePlay charts in November 1985 (just below Capcom's Commando). It ended the year as America's second highest-grossing arcade game of 1985, below the Data East fighting game Karate Champ. Kung-Fu Master was later also America's eleventh highest-grossing arcade game of 1986, according to the annual RePlay chart.

Claire Edgley of Computer and Video Games gave the arcade game a positive review in March 1985. She was positively surprised by the "hard-hitting" action, the "very fast" and "breath-taking" pace, and large number of enemies. She also praised the controls, referring to Thomas as "a whirling, kicking, jumping, fighting machine" controlled by an eight-way joystick and two buttons, the "energy levels" which allow the player to "absorb a large number of hits" from enemies, the smooth "lifelike" picturesque graphics, and the catchy music jingles. She concluded by saying if "you thought that Karate Champ was good — wait 'til you try this one!"

Mike Roberts also gave the arcade game a positive review in the May 1985 issue of Computer Gamer. He stated it was part of the "current craze" for arcade martial arts games, but said it had "more of a story line and game play" than others, noting the progression through five floors, simplified controls, abilities such as ducking and jumping, and multiple "standard baddies" followed by "super baddies" who are tougher to beat; he refers to the final opponent as the boss of organization X. Matt Fox later reviewed the arcade game in 2013, praising the gameplay, animation and innovation.

=== Ports ===
In Japan, the Famicom version sold 1.42 million copies. In North America, the NES version titled Kung Fu was the top-selling video game in the United States during July 1986, and again in September. The NES version went on to sell 3.5 million copies worldwide. In Europe, the Commodore 64 port topped the UK Gallup software sales charts in February 1986, and went on to become one of the top five best-selling Commodore 64 games of 1986. The ZX Spectrum version also sold well.

Top Score reviewed the NES version in early 1987, calling it "a fantastic reproduction of its arcade counterpart" and an action-packed winner. Tony Takoushi of Computer and Video Games called it "a near perfect conversion with all the gameplay and levels" intact from the arcade original, praising the gameplay as well as the "solid" graphics and sound. In 2017, IGN ranked the NES port at number 62 on its list of top 100 NES games. They said that, despite being a "dumbed-down port" compared to the arcade original, it was a fun game with rewarding gameplay, challenging boss battles and replay value.

Commodore User gave the Commodore 64 version a positive review in February 1986. Rick Teverbaugh reviewed the Commodore and Apple versions for Computer Gaming World in 1986. He called it "a karate game with adventure elements thrown in" and said that it looked better on the Commodore than on the Apple.

== Legacy ==
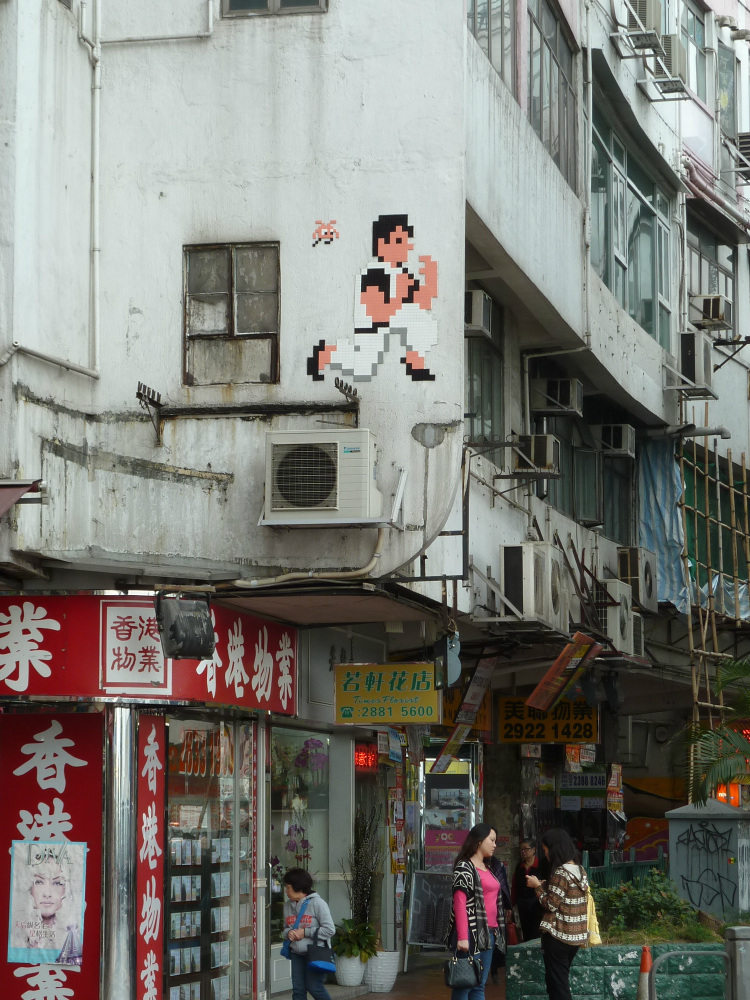
Mosaic of "Thomas" by Invader in Hong Kong (2014)

The arcade version was later included along with the arcade versions of 10-Yard Fight and Zippy Race in IAC/Irem Arcade Classics for the PlayStation and Sega Saturn, released in Japan only in 1996 by Irem and I'Max. The arcade version was released to cell phones.

The Amstrad CPC and ZX Spectrum versions were included on the 1986 compilation They Sold a Million 3, along with Fighter Pilot, Ghostbusters, and Rambo.

=== Sequels and successors ===
Dragon Wang is an action game made by Sega for the SG-1000 released in 1985 and was inspired by Kung-Fu Master. The protagonist is Wang (inspired by Jackie Chan and/or his character Thomas) whose name means "King" in Chinese.

My Hero was released by Sega for arcades in 1985 and for the Master System on January 1, 1986. The gameplay format is similar to Irem's Kung-Fu Master.

Lady Master (レディーマスター, Redī Masutā) shortened from Lady Master of Kung Fu and known as Nunchackun in the US, is 2D side-scrolling fighting game developed by Taito and published by Magic Electronics in 1985 for arcades. The player controls a character known as Lady (レディ), a female martial artist skilled in kung-fu using kicks and leg sweeps and wields nunchaku as a primary weapon. Gameplay can be best described as a combination between its inspiration Kung-Fu Master and Taito's earlier title Elevator Action. Lady fights a multitude of different enemies inside a large mansion featuring several floors with elevators that she uses to reach them. Certain rooms on some floors are open, allowing her to enter them. These room may contain items, letters that can be collected for a stage end bonus, or more difficult enemies. These enemies may provide powerups when defeated. A room on the top floor contains a stage boss. The game also features an alternating two-player mode. This game is one of the earlier titles to feature a playable female protagonist.

After designing Kung-Fu Master, Takashi Nishiyama was later hired by Capcom. He designed an arcade successor for Capcom, Trojan (1986), which evolved the basic gameplay concepts of Kung-Fu Master. The NES port included a one-on-one fighting mode, a precursor to Nishiyama's work on Street Fighter.

Black Belt is a 1986 beat 'em up game developed and published by Sega for the Master System. The game is a modification of the Mark III title, Hokuto no Ken, based on the manga series of the same name, which is known as Fist of the North Star outside Japan. The export version of the game was released without this license, forcing alterations to character names and graphics. This title was commonly compared to Irem's Kung-Fu Master in both visuals and mechanics.

First released in Japan in July 1986, Black Belt was localized for North America, Europe, and Brazil. Japan also saw a Wii Virtual Console re-release and a PlayStation 2 remake as part of the Sega Ages line. While commonly compared to Irem's Kung-Fu Master in both visuals and mechanics,

Kung Fu Kid, known in Japan as Makai Retsuden (魔界列伝), is a Master System video game released in 1987. It is the follow-up to the Sega SG-1000 title Dragon Wang with both titles playing very closely to Spartan X.

China Warrior, known as The Kung Fu (Note: Japanese: ザ・クンフー, Hepburn: Za Kunfū) (THE 功夫) in Japan, is a beat 'em up game made in 1987 by Hudson Soft for the PC Engine/TurboGrafx-16. The gameplay and controls are similar to Irem's arcade game Kung-Fu Master (1984) and Taito's Gladiator (1986).

Originally in 1985, Irem began work on the prototype Super Kung-Fu Master which later expanded the work into an arcade sequel called Beyond Kung-Fu: Return of the Master under development and underwent location testing in 1987, but was shelved after it underperformed. Beyond Kung-Fu was then revamped into Vigilante, after Irem decided to give the game a more American setting, which was released in 1988.

In 1990, the arcade game received a Game Boy sequel of the same name(s) as the 1984 original. The Game Boy version has similar gameplay to the arcade game, but with a completely different plot and setting. Outside of Japan, the portable version has a new protagonist named "Bruce Leap".

In 1991, a sequel was released in Japan for the Famicom, titled Spartan X 2. It was originally planned to release in North America as Kung Fu II in the fall of 1991, but ended up not releasing there. Spartan X 2 did not receive a North American release until 2016, when it was included as a built-in title for the Retro-Bit Generations retro video game console under the name Kung-Fu Master 2.

Kung-Fu Master's popularity has extended to the gaming indies. Indie publisher and developer Toushiryoku Laboratory (闘志力研究所) released doujin games Tifa Tan X (TifaTan X, ティファタンX) in 2004 and its sequel Tifa Tan X2 (TifaTan X 2, ティファタンX2) in 2005 as light-hearted homages and ecchi style parodies of Spartan X for PC and stars Tifa Lockhart from Final Fantasy VII as a playable character. Inspired heavily from Kung-Fu Master, gameplay is similar across both titles with the second seeing improvement to overall gameplay, graphics, and sound. The second game also features other characters making cameos from various games as boss fights. These characters are Lilith from Darkstalkers, Mai Shiranui from Fatal Fury, Princess Athena from her own game, Abobo from Double Dragon, and a male Red Mage from the original Final Fantasy who is the main antagonist.

On December 26, 2019, developer PiXEL released their doujin game Xiaomei and the Flame Dragon's Fist (焔龍聖拳シャオメイ, Fire Dragon Master Fist Xiaomei) for PC through DLsite and was later ported to the Nintendo Switch by publisher Leoful on March 31, 2023 as a digital only release. The game pays homage mainly to the original Kung-Fu Master in terms of its hud, level layout, and overall structure although the title includes other elements from various games of its type during the 1980s and 1990s. The plot features heroine Xiaomei, who embarks on a journey to save her older sister, Xiaoyin, from the evil influence of the Dark Dragon. The Switch version also comes with a new story from Xiaoyin's perspective in Xiaoyin Mode (after completing the main story), with new characters, and unlockables such as wallpapers and character illustrations. Players fight enemies on a single plane from left to right to reach and battle a boss at the end of each stage. There are a variety of moves which can be strung together into combos for extra damage and points. While fighting, item pickups may appear which restore health and augment the player's attacks. Enemies include the classic Gripper types that swarm and immobilize the player and begins draining their health along with flying birds and dragons attacking from above. Former Namco composer Norio Nakagata was brought onboard along with one-time Sega sound designer Hirofumi Murasaki to create the music and sound effects. The game's illustrations and graphics are by Studio Vigor and character voices by Suika, a Japanese female vocal/idol unit.

=== Impact ===
==== Beat 'em up and fighting games ====
Kung-Fu Master is regarded as the first beat 'em up video game (also referred to as brawlers) in the world. According to Retro Gamer, Kung-Fu Master invented the genre. It distinguished itself from Karate Champ by simplifying the combat system and featuring multiple opponents along a side-scrolling playfield. It established the "walk forward and beat up dudes" trend that influenced many games after it. It also established the end-of-level boss battle structure used in the beat 'em up genre, with the player character progressing through levels and fighting a boss at the end of each level. In turn, this end-of-level boss battle structure was adapted from the Bruce Lee film Game of Death, where Lee's character fights a different boss character on each floor as he ascends a pagoda.

According to Matt Fox, it "one hundred percent defined" the beat 'em up genre, with variations of its plot structure used in virtually every scrolling beat 'em up since. There were numerous imitators, such as Black Belt (1986) and Kung Fu Kid (1987) on the Master System. Other beat 'em ups that followed its single-plane side-scrolling format include arcade games such as Sega's My Hero and Flashgal (1985), Taito's The Ninja Warriors (1987), Data East's Bad Dudes Vs. DragonNinja (1988) and Namco's Splatterhouse (1988). Other titles such as Technōs Japan's Renegade (1986) and Double Dragon (1987), Capcom's Final Fight (1989) and Sega's Streets of Rage (1991) evolved the beat 'em up formula established by Kung-Fu Master with a belt-scrolling format.

The boss battles had health meters for the player character and each boss, which led to the game temporarily becoming a one-on-one fighting game. The Kung-Fu Master boss battles became the basis for the 1987 fighting game Street Fighter, which was directed by Kung-Fu Master designer Takashi Nishiyama after leaving Irem for Capcom. Following the release of Kung-Fu Master, Capcom was interested in hiring Nishiyama, who then led the development of Street Fighter. Nishiyama later left Capcom to run SNK's video game development division, creating the Neo Geo arcade system board and fighting games including Fatal Fury, Art of Fighting, Samurai Shodown and The King of Fighters.

==== Side-scrolling character action games ====
Kung-Fu Master was an early example of a side-scrolling character action game, a genre of games that featured large sprite characters in colorful, side-scrolling environments. The core gameplay consisted of fighting large groups of weaker enemies using attacks (or weapons) such as punches, kicks, guns, swords, ninjutsu or magic. More arcade side-scrollers followed during the mid-to-late 1980s, including ninja games such as Taito's The Legend of Kage (1985), Sega's Shinobi (1987), and Tecmo's Ninja Gaiden (1988) as well as run and gun video games like Konami's Rush'n Attack and Namco's Rolling Thunder (1986). Kung-Fu Master was the first side-scrolling martial arts action game, serving as the prototype for most martial arts games during the late 1980s, and also established the health meter mechanic as a standard feature in fighting games and side-scrolling action games such as beat 'em ups. Jamie Lendino also notes that, unlike "most arcade games" which had emphasized high scores and lives, Kung-Fu Master "had a genuine narrative arc" with a beginning, middle and end.

The side-scrolling action gameplay played a key role in the development of Nintendo's influential side-scrolling platform game Super Mario Bros. (1985), developed by the same Nintendo team behind the NES port Kung Fu. Shigeru Miyamoto cited his development of the Famicom port as one of the fundamental factors behind his creation of Super Mario Bros. According to Miyamoto, the concept of Super Mario Bros. came about as a result of the "technical know-how" built up from Excitebike and Kung Fu, his work on which inspired him to conceive a game that would make the player "strategize while scrolling sideways" over long distances, have aboveground and underground levels, and feature colorful backgrounds rather than black backgrounds.

Kung Fu was one of the first NES titles that originated from a third-party developer, giving it a "special place" in the history of the Nintendo Entertainment System according to IGN. Kung-Fu Master also influenced the combat system of Zelda II: The Adventure of Link (1987).

=== In popular culture ===
Akira Toriyama cited the Famicom version of Spartan X as an inspiration for a major saga in the manga and anime series Dragon Ball: the Red Ribbon Army saga (1985-1986), specifically the Muscle Tower arc, which involves Goku ascending an enemy base and fighting enemies on each floor. This arc was a turning point for Dragon Ball, a departure from the tournament format of the previous saga. Tooru Fujisawa, creator of manga and anime series Great Teacher Onizuka (GTO), is also a fan of Spartan X.

The game also influenced a French film called Kung Fu Master (1988) directed by Agnès Varda. Despite the title, it is not an adaptation of the game, nor is it a martial arts film, but it is rather a drama film concerning a divorced mother falling in love with a 14 year-old video game player. The film showcases various arcade games, with the character's interest in the Kung-Fu Master arcade game being a central plot device.
