= My Hero (video game) =

1985 video game

My Hero/Seishun Scandal
- European Master System box art
- Developer: Coreland (Note: Master System version developed by Sega.)
- Publisher: Sega
- Designer: Kotaro Hayashida
- Platforms: Arcade, Master System
- Release: Arcade: JP: July 10, 1985; EU: October 1985; NA: 1985; Master System: JP: January 31, 1986; NA: September 1986; EU: August 1987
- Genre: Beat 'em up
- Modes: Single-player, multiplayer
- Arcade system: Sega System 1

My Hero, known as Seishun Scandal (青春スキャンダル, Seishun Sukyandaru; lit. 'Youth Scandal') in Japan, is a 1985 beat 'em up video game developed by Coreland and published by Sega for arcades. The gameplay format is similar to Irem's Kung-Fu Master (1984). In contrast to earlier martial arts games, My Hero departs from a more traditional martial arts setting, instead taking place in a contemporary urban city environment with street gangs, like later beat 'em ups such as Renegade (1986) and Double Dragon (1987). My Hero was later ported to the Master System in 1986.

== Gameplay ==
The main character (Takeshi/Steven) hits enemies with a bottle on stage 1.

The arcade version consists of three different levels, each continuing in an endless loop until the player runs out of lives. It starts out with the player character (named Takeshi in Japan, and Steven according to the European arcade flyer) on a city street watching as a street thug runs off with his girlfriend (named Remy, also according to the arcade flyer, Mari in Japan). As he pursues him, he must fight off gangs of other various street thugs. Halfway through the level, Steven has an opportunity to save a captive bystander who (if rescued) will help him fight until the bystander is killed. Soon (after jumping across platforms and dodging fireballs) Steven arrives on a beach and fights the thug that has captured Remy. After the boss is defeated by being hit ten times, the level is complete. This same process repeats for the remainder of the game, only with two other bosses and level designs. The second stage resembles an Edo Japanese ninja epic, with ninja themed enemies, followed by a sci-fi theme loosely based upon Planet of the Apes, including ape/human enemies.

Due to space limitations on the Sega Card, the Sega Master System port only features the street gang in three stages that go in a continuous loop until the player loses all lives and gets a game over. The ninjas and the ape/human enemies from the arcade version are omitted.

== Reception ==
In Japan, Game Machine listed My Hero as the most successful table arcade unit of July 1985.

Mike Roberts and Steve Phipps of Computer Gamer magazine reviewed the arcade game positively. They said the game was "a bit more basic than the incredible" Hang-On, but "is still quite enjoyable" and "an amusing variation on the kung-fu game theme". They said the "setting and the good graphics make this an enjoyable game to play", along with some "quite difficult" puzzles.

== See also ==
- Flashgal (1985)
