= Captain Silver =

1987 video game

- Japanese arcade flyer
- Developer: Jorudan
- Publishers: Data East (Arcade); Sega (Master System); Tokuma Shoten (Famicom)
- Composers: Shogo Sakai, Takafumi Miura, Yuji Suzuki (Famicom)
- Platforms: Arcade; Master System; Famicom
- Release: Arcade; JP: June 1987; NA: July 1987; EU: August 1987 Master System; JP: July 2, 1988; EU: 1988; NA: September 1989; Famicom; JP: December 16, 1988
- Genres: Platform, hack and slash
- Modes: Single-player, multiplayer

Captain Silver (キャプテンシルバー, Kyaputen Shirubā) is a side-scrolling hack and slash platform game released as an arcade video game by Data East in 1987. Home versions were published for the Master System by Sega and for the Famicom by Tokuma Shoten.

== Plot ==
A young sailor and former first mate named Jim Aykroyd (Jack Avery in US) goes on a journey to seek the lost treasure of Captain Silver, facing various perils along the way.

It is loosely based on Robert Louis Stevenson's novel Treasure Island in which a young sailor named Jim Hawkins confronts the pirate Long John Silver on a tropical island over his treasure.

== Gameplay ==
The arcade version

The controls consists of an eight-way joystick for walking, crouching and climbing ladders and two action buttons for attacking and jumping. The player is armed primarily with a sword slashing horizontally while standing and crouching and vertically while climbing a ladder.

Picking up flying fairies grants the player magic power, shooting projectiles with the sword. The player can increase the magic power by up to six levels, resulting in stronger projectiles.

There are other power-ups such as a longsword to destroy enemy projectiles, a pair of boots to walk faster and jump higher, a bottle of potion to take a hit from an enemy, and a stopwatch that temporarily stops the time limit. Both the longsword and the boots can only be used temporarily at first, but if the player acquires a second version of either while still wearing the previous one, they can be kept permanently until the player loses a life. Treasure items can be gathered for points as well. Keys can also be obtained, which gives the player access to item shops and treasure vaults. The player's own score is used as currency to gain power-ups and extra lives. Defeated enemies will also drop letter icons that the player can collect for points. If the player collects the required letters needed to fill out the "CAPTAIN SILVER" gauge at the bottom of the screen, an extra life is awarded.

There are a total of three stages (or scenes): a haunted town at night, a pirate ship, and a treasure island. Each scene features its unique set of enemy characters such as werewolves, witches, pirates, natives, several kinds of animals, man-eating plants and other hazards. Scene 3 ends with a final battle against the skeletal being of Captain Silver. After the player finishes the game once, there is a second quest consisting of harder versions of the same stages which must be beaten in order to complete the game.

== Home versions ==
=== Master System ===
The Master System version was released by Sega on July 2, 1988. Two versions of the game were produced, a one-Megabit cartridge for the North American market and a two-Megabit cartridge for Japan and Europe.

The play mechanics in the Master System version are roughly identical to the arcade game and most of the power-ups and bonus items are retained. The player can only increase magic power by up to three levels instead of six, the longsword power-up is removed and boots can no longer be worn permanently. However, the medicine power-up will last until the player gets hit and there are also treasure chests in certain stages that will give the player one of two rewards (a bonus item or free access to an item shop).

The American version only features four stages roughly based on the ones in the arcade version (a town, a ship, an island, and a mountain) and only two bosses (Captain Coppard and Captain Silver). The Japanese and European version features two additional stages set intermittently before the final two stages, several additional enemy characters, a boss for each stage in addition to the ones in the American version (a sorceress, a Cyclope, a fire-breathing dragon, and a banana-shaped warrior). The ending epilogue in the Japanese and European version features visuals as well, instead of the text-only epilogue of the American version. Both versions support Sega's FM sound module for the Master System.

=== Famicom version ===
The Famicom version was released exclusively in Japan by Tokuma Shoten on December 16, 1988. This version features several major differences from the arcade version. The player now has a health gauge and can take more than one hit before losing a life (which can be replenished by picking up hearts). However, some of the enemy grunts now take more than one hit to defeat as well. The player can now purchase all weapon power-ups in item shops, which can be changed through a sub-menu. The stages are different and the bosses include new foes such as Frankenstein's monster and a giant octopus. The player can enter houses and rooms where an old lady will offer advice (such as an enemy's weak point). However, some of the old ladies are hostile and will bring a curse to the player (like reducing his health by half). The ending varies depending on whether the player used a continue to finish the game.

== Reception ==
Reception

Review scores
Publication	Score	
Publication	Arcade	Master System
Computer and Video Games	Positive	
Electronic Gaming Monthly		4.5/10
The Games Machine (UK)		49%
Console XS		82%

In Japan, Game Machine listed Captain Silver on their September 1, 1987 issue as being the fourteenth most-successful table arcade unit of the month.
