= Saint Sword =

1991 video game

- North American cover art
- Developer: Cyclone System
- Publisher: Taito
- Platform: Sega Genesis
- Release: JP: June 28, 1991; NA: October 1991
- Genres: Action; Hack-and-slash
- Mode: Single-player

Saint Sword (セイントソード) is a hack-and-slash action game developed by Cyclone Systems and published by Taito for the Sega Genesis/Mega Drive in 1991.

== Gameplay ==
There are seven stages for gamers to play through; most of the enemies in each stage are merely a palette swap of each other. Defeating enemies allows Macress to gain access to power-ups that will give him physical enhancements which let the player progress past places within the stages, like angel's wings, a merman-like tail, and the strong body of a horse-like centaur.

== Plot ==
Taking place in a Greek Mythological setting, players control the Greek Titan Macress (unique to this work of fiction) as he travels back in time in order to prevent the demoness Gorgon from taking over the entire world.

== Reception ==
Reception

Review score
| Publication | Score |
|---|---|
| Famicom Tsūshin | 6/10, 6/10, 7/10, 5/10 |

Mean Machines gave it a score of 72%, opining "this Rastan-like game could have done with better graphics and sound, but as it stands, Saint Sword is a fairly playable effort."
