= Danan: The Jungle Fighter =

1991 video game

- Developer: Whiteboard
- Publisher: Sega
- Composer: Tadahiko Inoue
- Platform: Master System
- Release: EU: January 1991
- Genre: Action adventure
- Mode: Single-player

Danan: The Jungle Fighter is a 1991 action adventure game for the Master System published exclusively in Europe. It follows Danan, a man raised in the outskirts of the jungle by an adopted father figure, on his journey through the jungle in a bid to avenge his father's death by stopping the resurrection of an alien creature known as Gilbas. The gameplay sees the player traversing four timed side-scrolling levels, occasionally exploring to find helpful items, until a boss is encountered.

Upon its release in January 1991, the game received mixed reception from critics, who praised its graphics and plot, but criticized the soundtrack and low difficulty. Mixed reactions were also given towards the gameplay, which was criticized as being very repetitive and dull as well as lauded for its short simplistic design by various video game publications.

== Gameplay ==
Danan climbs a ladder to the upper level of the building. The HUD on the top of the screen shows how much health, time remaining, and score the player has.

Danan: The Jungle Fighter is a side-scrolling action-adventure game with minor platforming and role-playing elements. The player controls the warrior Danan through four timed levels, each of which contain a boss at the end. If the player is unable to complete a level in time, or loses all their health, the game ends. Although levels are linear, they contain items that can be found by exploring, such as time increasing clocks, knives which are required for progression and experience enhancing stars, which give the player more health when enough are obtained. Another set of items that can be collected are animal symbols, which allow the player to summon either an armadillo, an eagle, or a chimpanzee to their aid once enough are collected. Depending on who is summoned, the animal can help the player fight enemies, transport them to higher places, or restore health.

== Plot ==
In the tropics of the planet Gian, the young warrior Danan returns home from a hunting trip to find his adopted tribesman father Jimba mortally wounded. Before succumbing, he tells Danan to seek the aid of a prophet, who tells him that Jimba was killed by the Moralos clan because they possessed the Knife of Light; one of the three sacred items said to have been used by the hero Aganan to seal the mantis-like alien creature Gilbas. The prophet gives Danan a sacred item and asks that he investigate why the clan killed Jimba. After being saved from a trap by a woman named Linda, Danan arrives in the Morolos village where he learns that the clan was deceived by people from a battleship into clamoring for the return of Gilbas. The clan's war chieftain thanks Danan with another sacred item.

Danan learns that the owner of the ship, Emperor Wolf, intends to resurrect Gilbas at the Altar of Sacrifice to bring about world domination and that his forces are already at the altar with the Knife of Light, ready to use Linda as a human sacrifice for the resurrection. There, Danan is unsuccessful in stopping Linda from being transformed into Gilbas, but manages to save her after battling and sealing him there with the three sacred items, deciding afterward to guard the altar in order to stop him from being resurrected again.

== Reception ==
Reception

Review scores
Publication	Score
Computer and Video Games	54%
Raze	66%
Mean Machines	72%
Sega Power	85%

Danan: The Jungle Fighter received mixed reviews from critics. Computer and Video Games derided the game as dull and repetitive, stating that while the gameplay is fun in short bursts the overall experience is tedious. Reviewers for Mean Machines remarked that the game did not try to be original and that its difficulty was very low, but highlighted its graphics for being interesting and the presentation for being well executed. Sega Power praised the game, citing the graphics, gameplay, plot and unique animal summoning mechanic, although noted that the soundtrack was lackluster and the lack of continues was cumbersome. Raze noted that the game borrowed much of its aspects from previous titles in the genre and found the soundtrack and gameplay repetitive, but did praise the graphics.
