= Hack and slash =

Tabletop and video game genre

Hack and slash, also known as hack and slay (H&S or HnS) or slash 'em up, refers to a type of gameplay that emphasizes combat with melee-based weapons (such as swords or blades). They may also feature projectile-based weapons as well (such as guns) as secondary weapons. It is a sub-genre of beat 'em up games, which focuses on melee combat, but developed into a genre of its own.

The term "hack and slash" was originally used to describe a play style in tabletop role-playing games, carrying over from there to MUDs, massively multiplayer online role-playing games, and role-playing video games. In arcade and console style action video games, the term has an entirely different usage, specifically referring to action games with a focus on real-time combat with hand-to-hand weapons as opposed to guns or fists. The two types of hack-and-slash games are largely unrelated, though action role-playing games may combine elements of both.

== Types of hack-and-slash games ==
=== Action video games ===
In the context of action video games, the terms "hack and slash", "style/skill combat", or "slash 'em up" refer to melee weapon-based action games that are a sub-genre of beat 'em ups. Traditional 2D side-scrolling examples include Taito's The Legend of Kage (1985) and Rastan (1987), Sega's arcade video game series Shinobi (1987 debut) and Golden Axe (1989 debut), Data East's arcade game Captain Silver (1987), Tecmo's early Ninja Gaiden (Shadow Warriors) 2D games (1988 debut), Capcom's Strider (1989), the Master System game Danan: The Jungle Fighter (1990), Taito's Saint Sword (1991), Vivid Image's home computer game First Samurai (1991), and Vanillaware's Dragon's Crown (2013). The term "hack-and-slash" in reference to action-adventure games dates back to 1987, when Computer Entertainer reviewed The Legend of Zelda and said it had "more to offer than the typical hack-and-slash" epics.

In the early 21st century, journalists covering the video game industry often use the term "hack and slash" to refer to a distinct genre of 3D, third-person, weapon-based, melee action games. Examples include Capcom's Devil May Cry, Onimusha, and Sengoku Basara franchises, Koei Tecmo's Dynasty Warriors and 3D Ninja Gaiden games, Sony's Genji: Dawn of the Samurai and God of War, as well as Bayonetta, Darksiders, Dante's Inferno, Kingdom Hearts, and No More Heroes. The sub-genre that modernized the hack and slash is sometimes known as a "character action" game, and represents a modern evolution of traditional arcade-action, hack and slash games. This subgenre of games was largely initiated and defined by Hideki Kamiya, creator of the first Devil May Cry, Okami, and Bayonetta. In turn, Devil May Cry (2001) was influenced by earlier hack-and-slash games, including Onimusha: Warlords (2001) and Strider.

Hack-and-slash games have adopted concepts from beat 'em up and fighting games. These concepts include knockdowns, meter management, canceling, I-frames, hit/block stun, super armor, punishing, and zoning/spacing.

=== Role-playing games ===
The term "hack and slash" itself has roots in "pen and paper" role-playing games such as Dungeons & Dragons (D&D), denoting campaigns of violence with no other plot elements or significant goal. The term itself dates at least as far back as 1980, as shown in a Dragon article by Jean Wells and Kim Mohan which includes the following statement: "There is great potential for more than hacking and slashing in D&D or AD&D; there is the possibility of intrigue, mystery and romance involving both sexes, to the benefit of all characters in a campaign."

Hack and slash made the transition from the tabletop to role-playing video games, usually starting in D&D-like worlds. This form of gameplay influenced a wide range of action role-playing games, including games such as Xanadu (1985) and the Diablo series (1997 debut).

Dynasty Warriors 4 (2003) developed by Omega Force and published by Koei features hack and slash action gameplay from a third person perspective similar to previous titles in the series. Also, player personas, weapons, and bodyguards in that game can gain experience from combat that increase their rank, which strengthens their combat statistics. Other video games like Samurai Warriors (again developed by Omega Force and published by Koei) and Drakengard (2003 debut) created a "Musou or Musō style" subgenre of hack & slash action role-playing games. Meanwhile, RPG titles under the Soulslike subgenre were originally referred to as hack & slash RPGs, especially with the release of Bloodborne (2015) with its similar stylish combat mechanics. Other franchises from different genres have some games which left their previous genres or identities and dived into the hack & slash action RPG genre, such as the Final Fantasy series with Final Fantasy Crystal Chronicles (2003) and Final Fantasy XVI (2023).

== See also ==
- Action role-playing game
- Beat 'em up
- Dungeon crawl
- List of beat 'em ups, including hack-and-slash games
- Powergaming
- Roguelike
- Slasher film
