= Beat 'em up =

Video game genre

A beat 'em up (also known as brawler and, in some markets, beat 'em all) is a video game genre featuring hand-to-hand combat against a large number of opponents. Traditional beat 'em ups take place in scrolling, two-dimensional (2D) levels, while some modern games feature more open three-dimensional (3D) environments with a larger number of enemies. Gameplay tends to follow arcade genre conventions, such as being simple to learn, but difficult to master, and the combat system is typically more highly developed than other side-scrolling action games. Two-player cooperative gameplay and multiple player characters are also hallmarks of the genre. Most of these games take place in urban settings and feature crime-fighting and revenge-based plots, though some games may employ historical, science fiction or fantasy themes.

The first beat 'em up was 1984's Kung-Fu Master, which was based on Hong Kong martial arts films. 1986's Nekketsu Kōha Kunio-kun introduced the belt scroll format employed extensively by later games, and also popularized contemporary urban settings, while its Western localized version Renegade further introduced underworld revenge themes. The genre then saw an interval of high popularity between the release of Double Dragon in 1987, which defined the two-player cooperative mode and continuous belt scroll format central to classic beat 'em ups, and 1991's Street Fighter II, which drew gamers towards one-on-one fighting games. Games such as Streets of Rage, Final Fight, Golden Axe and Teenage Mutant Ninja Turtles are other classics to emerge from this time. In the late 1990s, the genre lost popularity with the emergence of 3D-polygon technology.

In the 2000s, a sub-genre of 3D hack-and-slash games emerged (also known as "character action games"), adapting the beat 'em up formula to utilize large-scale 3D environments, with popular franchises including God Hand, Devil May Cry, Dynasty Warriors, God of War and Bayonetta. Since the 2010s, traditional 2D beat 'em ups have seen a resurgence, with popular titles such as Dungeon Fighter Online, Dragon's Crown, Streets of Rage 4 and Teenage Mutant Ninja Turtles: Shredder's Revenge.

== Definition ==
A beat 'em up (also called a "brawler") is a type of action game where the player character must fight a large number of enemies in unarmed combat or with melee weapons. Gameplay consists of walking through a level, one section at a time, defeating a group of enemies before advancing to the next section; a boss fight normally occurs at the end of each level. Arcade versions of these games are often quite difficult to win, causing players to spend more money.

Beat 'em ups are related to, but distinct from fighting games, which are based around one-on-one matches rather than scrolling levels and multiple enemies. Such terminology is loosely applied, however, as some commentators prefer to conflate the two terms. At times, both one-on-one fighting games and scrolling beat 'em ups have influenced each other in terms of graphics and style and can appeal to fans of either genre. Occasionally, a game will feature both kinds of gameplay.

In the United Kingdom, video game magazines during the 1980s to 1990s, such as Mean Machines and Computer & Video Games (C+VG) for example, referred to all games which had a combat motif as beat 'em ups, including fighting games. However, they were differentiated by a specific prefix. Games like Double Dragon or Final Fight were called "scrolling beat 'em ups" and games such as Street Fighter II or Mortal Kombat were referred to as "one on one beat 'em ups". Fighting games were still being called "beat 'em up" games in the UK gaming press up until the end of the 1990s.

== Game design ==
Beat 'em up games usually employ vigilante crime fighting and revenge plots with the action taking place on city streets, though historical and fantasy themed games also exist. Players must walk from one end of the game world to the other, and thus each game level will typically scroll horizontally. Some later beat 'em ups dispense with 2D-based scrolling levels, instead allowing the player to roam around larger 3D environments, though they retain the same simple-to-learn gameplay and control systems. Throughout the level, players may acquire weapons which they can use as well as power-ups that replenishes health.

As players walk through the level, they are stopped by groups of enemies that must be defeated before they can continue. The level ends when all enemies are defeated. Each level contains many identical groups of enemies, making these games notable for their repetition. In beat 'em up games, players often fight a boss—an enemy much stronger than the other enemies—at the end of each level.

Beat 'em ups often let the player pick between a selection of protagonists, each with their own strengths, weaknesses, and set of moves. The combat system is typically more highly developed than other side-scrolling action games. Attacks can include rapid combinations of basic attacks (combos) as well as jumping and grappling attacks. Characters often have their own special attacks, which leads to different strategies depending on what character the player selects. The control system is usually simple to learn, often comprising just two attack buttons. These buttons can be combined to pull off combos, as well as jumping and grappling attacks. Since the release of Double Dragon, many beat 'em ups have allowed two players to play the game cooperatively—a central aspect to the appeal of these games. Beat 'em ups are more likely to feature cooperative play than other genres.

== Sub-genres ==
The beat 'em up or brawler genre includes several sub-genres:

- Scrolling beat 'em up – Beat 'em up games which employ a 2D scrolling format.
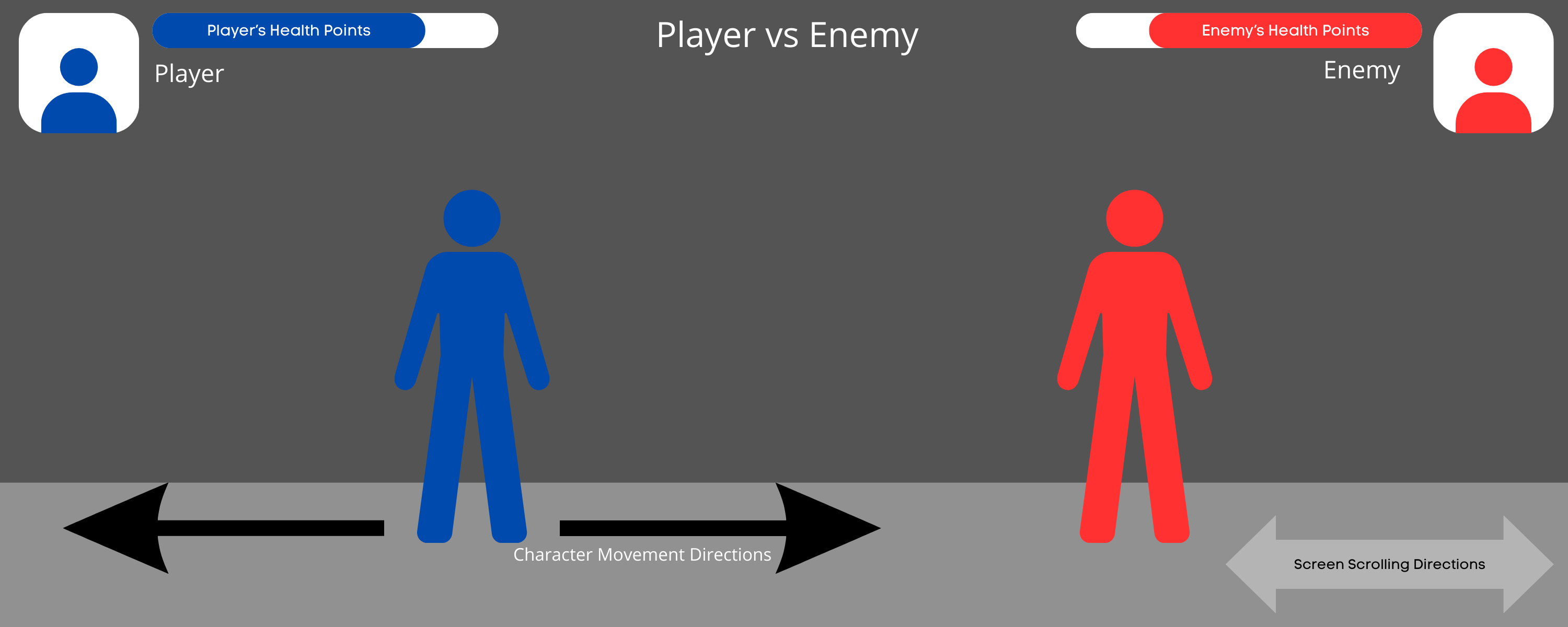
  - Character movement in a single‑plane beat ’em up
    Single-plane beat 'em up or side-scrolling beat 'em up – Scrolling beat 'em ups that move along a single side-scrolling plane of motion. This was the earliest style of beat 'em up, with the format established by Irem's Kung-Fu Master (1984), designed by Takashi Nishiyama. Other titles that followed in the sub-genre include Sega's My Hero and Flashgal (1985), Taito's The Ninja Warriors (1987), Data East's Bad Dudes Vs. DragonNinja (1988) and Namco's Splatterhouse (1988). This early style of beat 'em up is part of a broader genre of side-scrolling character action games, including 2D fighting games, scrolling platform games, and run and gun video games. A later example of this style is Capcom's Viewtiful Joe (2003).
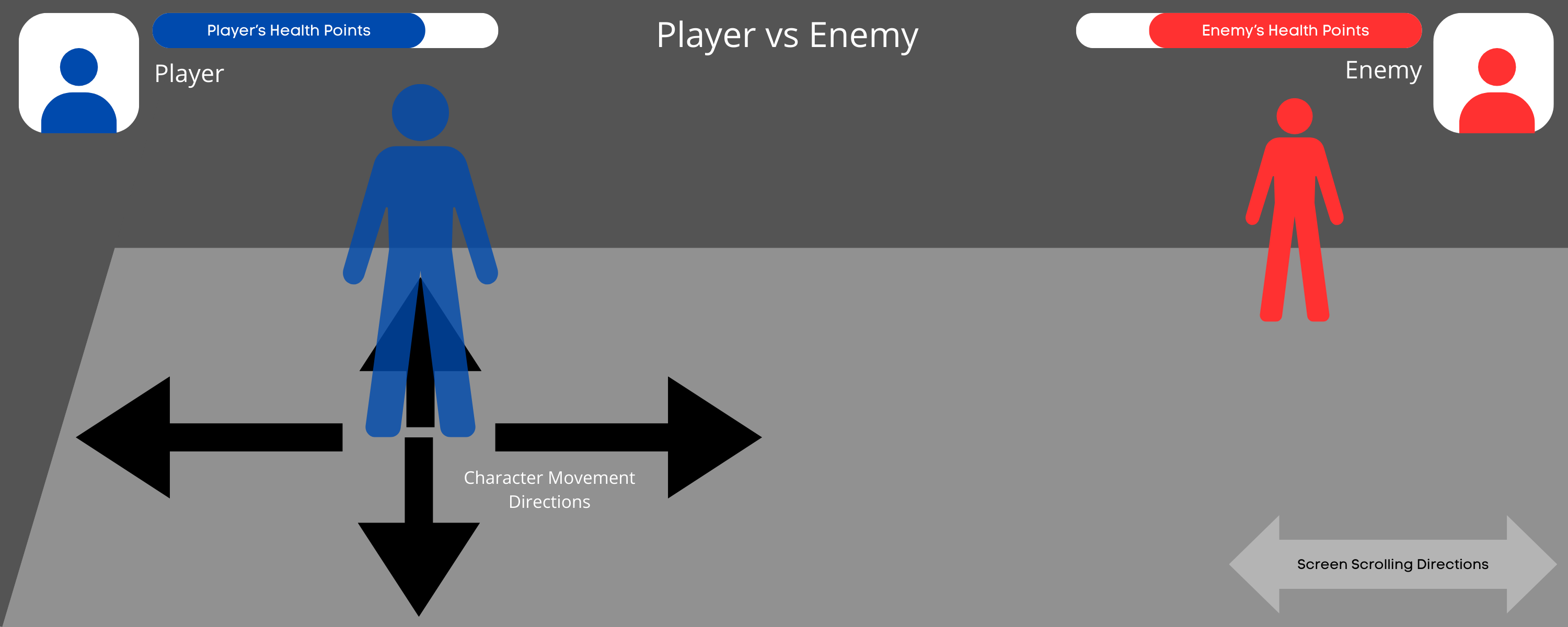
  - Character movement in a belt‑scroll beat ’em up
    Belt-scroll action game or belt-scroll beat 'em up – The most popular type of scrolling beat 'em up, these games use a belt scroll format, a side-scrolling format with a downward camera angle where players can move both vertically and horizontally along a horizontally scrolling environment. The term "belt scroll action game" was coined in Japan, where it was named as such due to the scrolling style resembling conveyor belt motion. This format was introduced by Technos Japan's Nekketsu Kōha Kunio-kun (1986), known as Renegade in the West, and further developed and popularized by its follow-up Double Dragon (1987). Later popular examples including titles such as the Sega's Streets of Rage series and Capcom's Final Fight series.
- Hack and slash – Beat 'em ups or brawlers that are centered around combat with melee-based weapons, such as swords or blades, rather than fist-fighting.
  - 2D hack & slash or slash 'em up – 2D scrolling beat 'em ups centered around melee-based weapons. Examples include Sega's arcade series Shinobi (1987 debut) and Golden Axe (1989 debut), Data East's Captain Silver (1987), Taito's Rastan (1987) and Saint Sword (1991), Tecmo's early Ninja Gaiden (Shadow Warriors) 2D games (1988 debut), Capcom's Strider (1989), the Master System game Danan: The Jungle Fighter (1990), and Vanillaware's Dragon's Crown (2013).
  - 3D hack & slash or character action game – These are third-person action games centered around weapon-based melee combat in three-dimensional environments. The sub-genre was largely defined by Capcom's Devil May Cry (2001), designed by Hideki Kamiya, with other examples including Koei Tecmo's Dynasty Warriors and 3D Ninja Gaiden games, later Devil May Cry games, Sony's God of War and Genji: Dawn of the Samurai, No More Heroes, Kamiya's Bayonetta, Darksiders and Dante's Inferno.
- 3D beat 'em up – 3D brawlers that are closer to traditional beat 'em ups, with fist-fighting, but take place in larger 3D environments. Examples include Sega's Die Hard Arcade (1996) and Yakuza series (2005 debut), Eidos Interactive's Fighting Force (1997), Squaresoft's The Bouncer (2000), and Capcom's God Hand (2006). This sub-genre of beat 'em up is generally not as popular as 3D hack & slash games.
- Crowd combat fighting games – 3D brawlers which feature a person fighting a crowd of enemies. Examples include Koei Tecmo's Warriors franchise, including the Dynasty Warriors and Samurai Warriors series.

== History ==
Beat 'em up games have origins in martial arts films, particularly Bruce Lee's Hong Kong martial arts films. Lee's Game of Death (1972) inspired the basic structure of a beat 'em up, with Lee ascending five levels of a pagoda while fighting numerous enemies and several boss battles along the way. Another Lee film, Enter the Dragon (1973), also influenced the genre. The first video game to feature fist fighting was Sega's arcade boxing game Heavyweight Champ (1976), which is viewed from a side-view perspective like later fighting games. However, it was Data East's fighting game Karate Champ (1984) which popularized martial arts themed games.

=== Earliest beat 'em ups (mid-1980s) ===
Kung-Fu Master (known as Spartan X in Japan), designed by Takashi Nishiyama and released by Irem in 1984, laid the foundations for side-scrolling beat 'em ups. It simplified the combat system of Karate Champ, while adding numerous enemies along a side-scrolling playfield. The game was based on two Hong Kong martial arts films: Jackie Chan's Wheels on Meals (1984), known as Spartan X in Japan (where the game was a tie-in), and Bruce Lee's Game of Death, the latter inspiring the five end-of-level boss fights and the plot structure, variations of which were used in subsequent scrolling beat 'em ups. Nishiyama, who had previously created the side-scrolling shooter Moon Patrol (1982), combined a shoot 'em up gameplay rhythm with fighting elements when he designed Kung-Fu Master. The game was also distinctive for its use of health meters, for both the player character and each boss. Another 1984 release, Bruce Lee, combined multi-player, multi-character combat with traditional collecting, platform and puzzle gameplay. Later that year, Karateka combined the one-on-one fight sequences of Karate Champ with the freedom of movement in Kung-Fu Master, and it successfully experimented with adding plot to its fighting action. It was also among the first martial arts games to be successfully developed for and ported across different home systems. Sega's My Hero (1985) adopted the gameplay format of Kung-Fu Master, but changing the more traditional martial arts setting to a more contemporary urban city environment with street gangs.

Nekketsu Kōha Kunio-kun, developed by Technōs Japan and released in 1986 in Japan, introduced the belt scroll format, allowing both vertical and horizontal movement along a side-scrolling environment, while also popularizing street brawling in the genre. Created by Yoshihisa Kishimoto, the game was inspired by his own teenage high school years getting into daily fights, along with Bruce Lee's martial arts film Enter the Dragon. The Western adaptation Renegade (released the same year) added an underworld revenge plot that proved more popular with gamers than the principled combat sport of other martial arts games. Renegade set the standard for future beat 'em up games as it introduced the ability to move both horizontally and vertically. It also introduced the use of combo attacks, and in contrast to earlier games, the opponents in Renegade and Double Dragon could take much more punishment. This required a succession of punches, with the first hit temporarily immobilizing the enemy, who would then be rendered defenseless against subsequent punches. Rather than one-hit kills, the player needed to strike enemies multiple times, "beating them up", in order to defeat them. Compared to earlier side-scrollers, the environment was expanded to a scrolling arena-like space, while the combat system was more highly developed, with the player able to punch, kick, grab, charge, throw and stomp enemies.

=== Mainstream success (late 1980s to early 1990s) ===
In 1987, the release of Double Dragon, designed as Technōs Japan's spiritual successor to Kunio-kun (Renegade), ushered in a "golden age" for the beat 'em up genre that took it to new heights with its detailed set of martial arts attacks and its two-player cooperative gameplay. It also had a continuous side-scrolling world, in contrast to the bounded scrolling arenas of Kunio-kun, giving Double Dragon a sense of progression, along with the use of cut scenes to give it a cinematic look and feel. Like Kunio-kun, the game's combat system drew inspiration from the Bruce Lee film Enter the Dragon, while Double Dragon added a new disaster-ridden city setting inspired by the Mad Max films and Fist of the North Star manga and anime series. Double Dragon became Japan's third highest-grossing table arcade game of 1987, before becoming America's overall highest-grossing dedicated arcade game for two years in a row, in 1988 and 1989.

Double Dragon's success resulted in a flood of beat 'em ups in the late 1980s, where acclaimed titles like Golden Axe and Final Fight (both 1989) distinguished themselves from the others. Final Fight was Capcom's intended sequel to Street Fighter (provisionally titled Street Fighter '89), but the company ultimately gave it a new title. In contrast to the simple combo attacks in Renegade and Double Dragon, the combo attacks in Final Fight were more dynamic, and the sprites were much larger. Acclaimed as the best game in the genre, Final Fight spawned two home sequels and was later ported to other systems. Golden Axe was acclaimed for its visceral hack and slash action and cooperative mode and was influential through its selection of multiple protagonists with distinct fighting styles. It is considered one of the strongest beat 'em up titles for its fantasy elements, distinguishing it from the urban settings seen in other beat 'em ups. Bad Dudes Vs. DragonNinja featured platform elements, while P.O.W.: Prisoners of War took the weapon aspect a stage further, allowing players to pick up guns. Another beat 'em up—River City Ransom (1989), named Street Gangs in Europe—featured role-playing game elements with which the player's character could be upgraded, using money stolen from defeated enemies.

The Streets of Rage series was launched in the early 1990s and borrowed heavily from Final Fight. Streets of Rage 2 (1992) for Sega's Mega Drive/Genesis was one of the first console games to match the acclaim of arcade beat 'em ups. Its level design was praised for taking traditional beat 'em up settings and stringing them together in novel ways, and its success led to it being ported to arcades. The beat 'em up genre was also popular for video games centered around television series and movies, with Teenage Mutant Ninja Turtles and Batman Returns a surprise success, and encouraged many more beat 'em up games based on the characters. Taito's arcade game Riding Fight (1992) combined beat 'em up gameplay with a pseudo-3D chase view and hoverboard racing gameplay. The "golden age" of the genre eventually came to an end during the early 1990s, following the success of Capcom's Street Fighter II (1991) which drew gamers back towards one-on-one fighting games, while the subsequent emerging popularity of 3D video games in the late 1990s diminished the popularity of 2D-based pugilistic games in general.

Another notable game from this era is Gang Wars, released in 1989.

=== Transition to 3D (late 1990s to early 2000s) ===
Sega's Die Hard Arcade (1996) was the first beat 'em up to use texture-mapped 3D polygon graphics, and it used a sophisticated move set likened to a fighting game. It updated the Streets of Rage formula to 3D, while implementing moves and combos from the fighting game Virtua Fighter 2 (1994), the ability to combine weapons to create more powerful weapons, and in two-player mode the ability to perform combined special moves and combos. It also had cut scenes, with quick time events interspersed between scenes. The game achieved a certain degree of success, and entered the Japanese arcade earnings charts at number-two in August 1996. Core Design's Fighting Force (1997) was anticipated to redefine the genre for 32-bit consoles through its use of a 3D environment. However, it was met with an indifferent reception. The beat 'em up genre declined in the late 1990s, largely disappearing from arcades by the end of the decade.

In 2000, Squaresoft published The Bouncer (2000), developed by DreamFactory and designed by former Virtua Fighter designer Seiichi Ishii, for the PlayStation 2 console. It was an ambitious project that attempted to deliver a cinematic, story-driven beat 'em up, combining 3D beat 'em up gameplay with action role-playing game elements, cutscenes, high production values and an "Active Character Selection" system where choices alter the storyline. It was highly anticipated due to Squaresoft's reputation with Japanese role-playing games such as Final Fantasy, but was met with a mixed reception upon release. The same year, Italian studio NAPS team released Gekido: Urban Fighters for the PlayStation console, which uses a fast-paced beat 'em up system, with many bosses and a colorful design in terms of graphics.

In the early 2000s, game reviewers started to pronounce that the genre had died off. By 2002, there were virtually no new beat 'em ups being released in arcades.

=== 3D hack-and-slash games (early 2000s to present) ===
After 2000, beat 'em ups began seeing a revival in the form of popular 3D hack and slash games in the style of Devil May Cry (2001 onwards), including Onimusha, Ninja Gaiden (2004 onwards), God of War (2005 onwards), God Hand (2006), Heavenly Sword (2007), Afro Samurai (2009), and Bayonetta (2009). Featuring a more fantasy themed approach, with longer campaigns and the variety seen before in multiple characters now being present in the one and only main character. Giving the player multiple weapons and movesets based on a variety of martial arts and different weapons. These games are also known as "character action" games, which represent an evolution of traditional arcade action games. The subgenre was largely defined by Hideki Kamiya, creator of Devil May Cry and Bayonetta.

A best-selling Japanese series is the Dynasty Warriors series, which beginning with Dynasty Warriors 2 (2000) offered beat 'em up action on large 3D battlefields with war strategy game elements, displaying dozens of characters on the screen at a time. The series to date spans 14 games (including expansions) which players in the West view as overly similar, although the games' creators claim their large audience in Japan appreciates the subtle differences between the titles. While critics saw Dynasty Warriors 2 as innovative and technically impressive, they held a mixed opinion of later titles. These later games received praise for simple, enjoyable gameplay, but were also derided as overly simplistic and repetitive.

=== Traditional beat 'em ups (early 2000s to present) ===
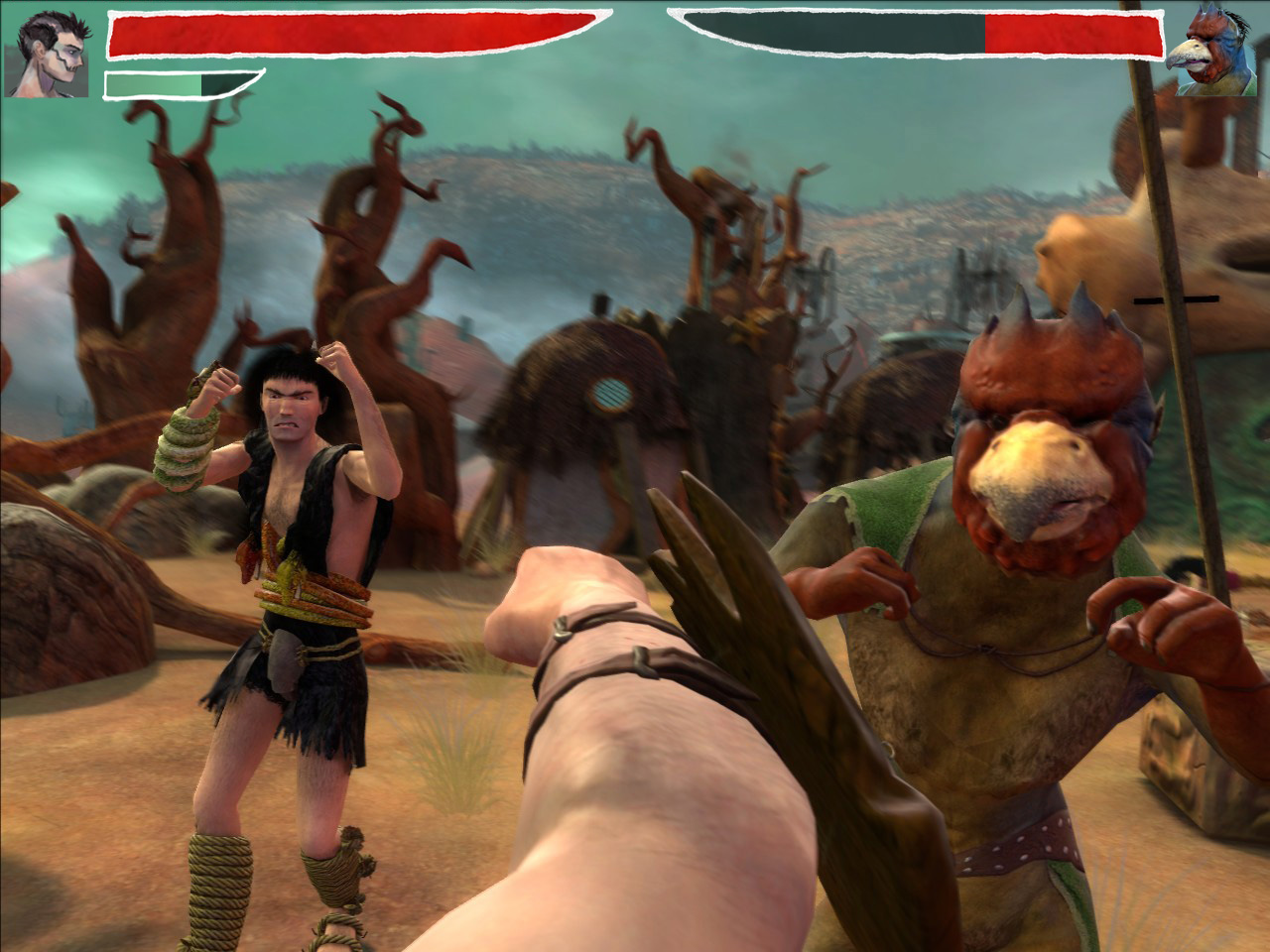
Zeno Clash (2009) features beat 'em up gameplay from a first-person perspective.

On the urban-themed side of the genre was the Yakuza series (2005 debut), which combined elaborate crime thriller plots and detailed interactive environments with street brawling action. Rockstar Games' The Warriors (based on the 1979 movie of the same name), released in 2005, featured large scale brawling in 3D environments interspersed with other activities such as chase sequences. The game also featured a more traditional side-scrolling beat 'em up Armies of the Night as bonus content, which was acclaimed along with the main game and was later released on the PlayStation Portable.

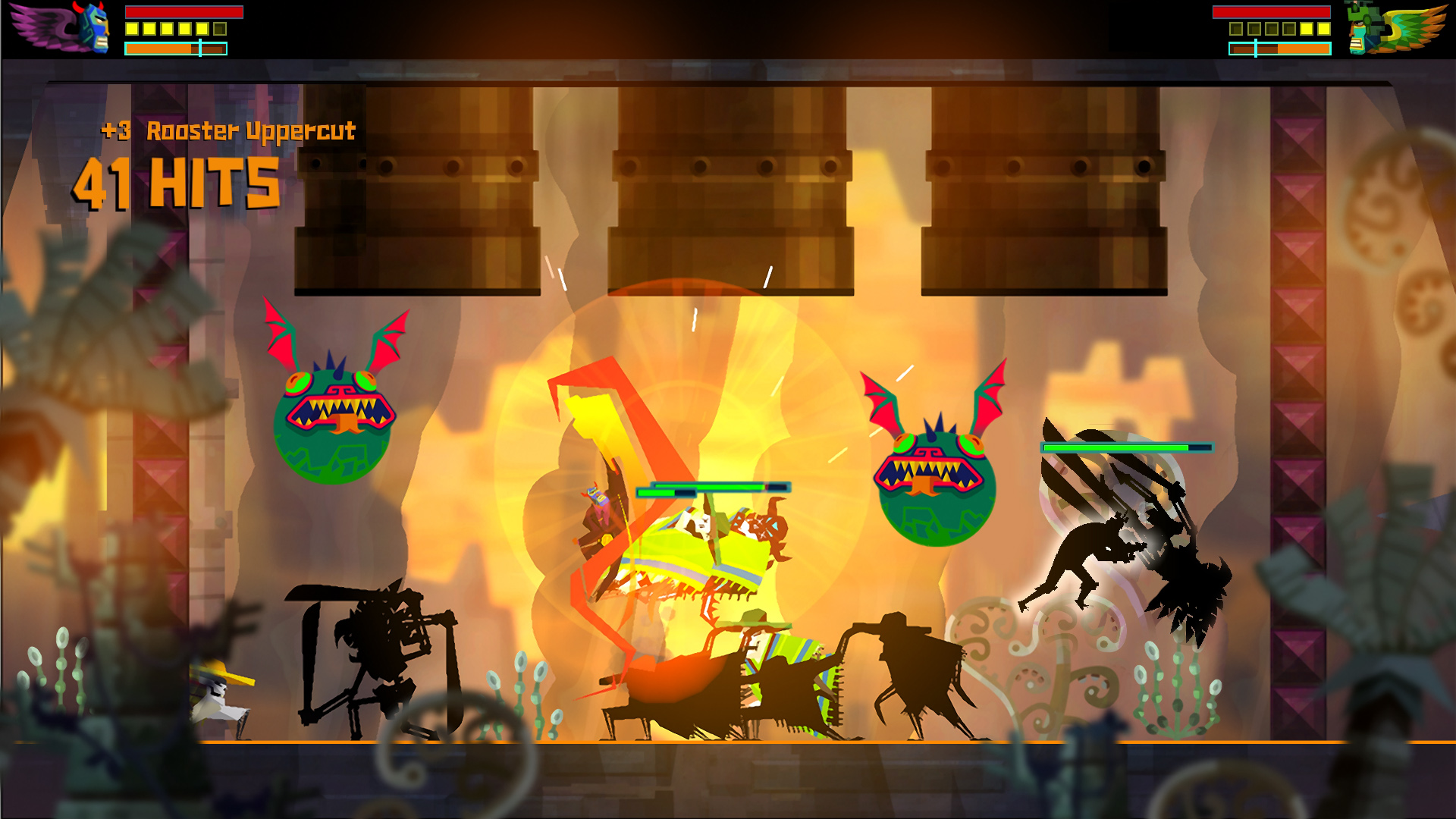
Guacamelee! (2013) is a brawling-based game based on luchadors fashioned after a Metroid-style game.

Capcom's Viewtiful Joe (2003), directed by Devil May Cry creator Hideki Kamiya, used cel-shaded graphics and innovative gameplay features (such as the protagonist's special powers) to "reinvigorate" its traditional 2D scrolling formula. Releases such as God Hand in 2006 and MadWorld in 2009 were seen as parodies of violence in popular culture, earning both games praise for not taking themselves as seriously as early beat 'em up games. Classic beat 'em ups have been re-released on services such as the Virtual Console and Xbox Live Arcade. Critics reaffirmed the appeal of some, while the appeal of others has been deemed to have diminished with time. Although the genre lacks the same presence it did in the late 1980s, some titles such as Viewtiful Joe and God Hand kept the traditional beat 'em up genre alive.

The traditional 2D beat 'em up genre has seen a resurgence in Asia, where the South Korean online beat 'em up Dungeon Fighter Online (2004) is very popular. Dungeon Fighter Online has become one of the most-played and highest-grossing games of all time, having grossed over $10 billion. Other traditional 2D scrolling beat 'em ups were released on Xbox Live Arcade and PlayStation Network including The Behemoth's Castle Crashers (2008), featuring cartoon graphics, quirky humor, and acclaimed cooperative gameplay, The Dishwasher: Vampire Smile (2011), Double Dragon Neon (2012) and Scott Pilgrim vs. the World: The Game (2010).

Fable Heroes (2012) is an Xbox Live Arcade only title. Saints Row IV (2013) featured a parody of Streets of Rage entitled "Saints of Rage", where the player rescues Johnny Gat from a virtual prison. Dragon's Crown (2013) is a 2D fantasy game with a mix of beat 'em up and ARPG elements that were specifically inspired by Golden Axe and Dungeons & Dragons: Tower of Doom. Streets of Rage 4 (2020) was also released to critical acclaim and has renewed interested in both the series and genre. Dragon's Crown sold over a million copies by 2017, while Streets of Rage 4 has sold over 2.5 million copies as of April 2021. Other well known classic franchises also gained new titles like Battletoads (2020), Teenage Mutant Ninja Turtles: Shredder's Revenge (2022), The Ninja Saviors: Return of the Warriors (2019) and River City Girls (2019).

The beat 'em up genre has also seen a resurgence within indie game development, resulting in unique titles such as DrinkBox Studios' 2013 indie title Guacamelee! and its 2018 sequel, which are both noted for their hybrid 2D Metroidvania-style platform brawler gameplay. Other indie titles are The Takeover (2019), Ninjin: Clash of Carrots (2018), and the critically acclaimed Fight'N Rage (2017).

== See also ==
- List of beat 'em ups
- Shoot 'em up
- Hack and slash
