= List of Metal Slug video games =

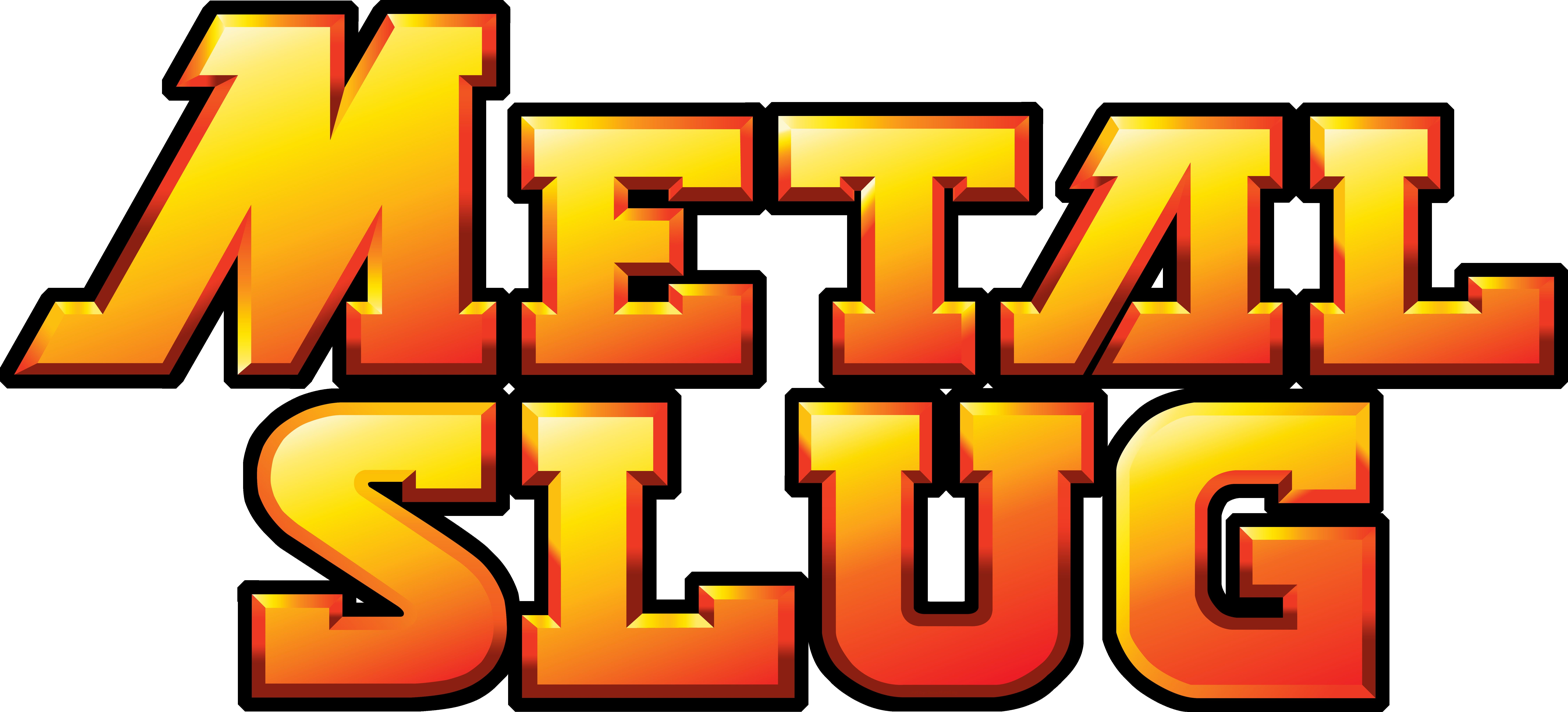
Logo of the Metal Slug series

Metal Slug is a series of run and gun video games first released on Neo-Geo arcade machines and game consoles created by SNK. It was also ported to other consoles, such as the Sega Saturn, the PlayStation, the Neo-Geo Pocket Color and more recently, the Game Boy Advance, PlayStation 2, iPhone, iPod Touch, Xbox, Xbox 360 and Nintendo DS. There is also an anthology of the first 7 games in the main series (including Metal Slug X) available for the Wii, PlayStation Portable, PlayStation 2 and Windows. In 2009, the first three games were officially ported by Games Load to Windows.

== Games ==
=== Main series ===
Game	Details
Metal Slug: Super Vehicle-001 Original release date(s): NA: April 18, 1996; JP: April 19, 1996	Release years by system: 1996 – Neo Geo; 1996 – Neo Geo CD; 1997 – Sega Saturn; 1997 – PlayStation; 2008 – Virtual Console; 2010 – PlayStation Network; 2012 – iOS/Android; 2015 – Windows (Steam); 2017 – Nintendo Switch
Metal Slug 2: Super Vehicle-001/II Original release date(s): JP: February 23, 1998; NA: April 2, 1998; EU: November 28, 2008	Release years by system: 1998 – Neo Geo; 1998 – Neo Geo CD; 2008 – Virtual Console; 2011 – PlayStation Network; 2013 – iOS/Android; 2016 – Windows (Steam); 2017 – Nintendo Switch
Metal Slug 3 Original release date(s): JP: March 23, 2000; NA: September 17, 2001; EU: November 12, 2004	Release years by system: 2000 – Neo Geo; 2003 – PlayStation 2; 2004 – Xbox; 2008 – Xbox Live Arcade; 2012 – Virtual Console; 2012 – iOS/Android; 2014 – Windows (Steam); 2014 – Linux; 2014 – macOS; 2015 – PlayStation Network; 2017 – Nintendo Switch
Metal Slug 4 Original release date(s): JP: March 27, 2002	Release years by system: 2002 – Neo Geo; 2004 – PlayStation 2; 2005 – Xbox; 2012 – Virtual Console; 2018 – Nintendo Switch
Metal Slug 5 Original release date(s): JP: November 14, 2003	Release years by system: 2003 – Neo Geo; 2005 – PlayStation 2; 2005 – Xbox; 2018 – Nintendo Switch
Metal Slug 6 Original release date(s): JP: February 22, 2006	Release years by system: 2006 – Atomiswave; 2006 – PlayStation 2
Metal Slug 7 Original release date(s): JP: July 17, 2008; NA: November 28, 2008; EU: February 27, 2009; AU: October 29, 2009	Release years by system: 2008 – Nintendo DS

=== Remakes ===
Game	Details
Metal Slug X: Super Vehicle-001 Original release date(s): NA: March 18, 1999; JP: March 19, 1999; EU: August 1, 2003	Release years by system: 1999 – Neo Geo; 2001 – PlayStation; 2012 – Virtual Console; 2013 – iOS/Android; 2014 – Microsoft Windows (Steam); 2017 – Nintendo Switch
Metal Slug X: Super Vehicle-001 Original release date(s): NA: March 18, 1999; JP: March 19, 1999; EU: August 1, 2003	Notes: A revised version of Metal Slug 2
Metal Slug XX Original release date(s): JP: December 23, 2009; NA: February 23, 2010; EU: June 25, 2010	Release years by system: 2009 – PlayStation Portable; 2010 – Xbox Live Arcade; 2018 – PlayStation 4; 2019 – Microsoft Windows (Steam)
Metal Slug XX Original release date(s): JP: December 23, 2009; NA: February 23, 2010; EU: June 25, 2010	Notes: A revised version of Metal Slug 7

=== Spin-offs ===
Game	Details
Metal Slug 1st Mission Original release date(s): JP: May 27, 1999	Release years by system: 1999 – Neo Geo Pocket Color
Metal Slug 2nd Mission Original release date(s): JP: March 9, 2000; NA: May 22, 2000	Release years by system: 2000 – Neo Geo Pocket Color
Metal Slug Advance Original release date(s): EU: November 12, 2004; JP: November 18, 2004; NA: December 2, 2004	Release years by system: 2004 – Game Boy Advance
Metal Slug Original release date(s): JP: June 29, 2006	Release years by system: 2006 – PlayStation 2
Metal Slug Original release date(s): JP: June 29, 2006	Notes: A third-person shooter; First 3D Metal Slug game
Metal Slug Touch Original release date(s): JP: December 16, 2009	Release years by system: 2009 – iOS
Metal Slug Touch Original release date(s): JP: December 16, 2009	Notes: Removed from the App Store on May 31, 2012
Metal Slug Defense Original release date(s): JP: May 1, 2014	Release years by system: 2014 – iOS/Android; 2015 – Windows (Steam)
Metal Slug Defense Original release date(s): JP: May 1, 2014	Notes: A tower defense game; Closed on mobile on April 17, 2023
Metal Slug Attack Original release date(s): February 14, 2016	Release years by system: 2016 – iOS/Android; 2024 – Windows (Steam), Nintendo Switch, PlayStation 4, PlayStation 5, Xbox Series X/S (as Metal Slug Attack Reloaded)
Metal Slug Attack Original release date(s): February 14, 2016	Notes: 20th Anniversary Special; Sequel to Metal Slug Defense; A tower defense game; Closed on January 12, 2023; Re-released in 2024 as Metal Slug Attack Reloaded without microtransactions and the SNK guest characters
Metal Slug Infinity Original release date(s): March 14, 2019	Release years by system: 2019 – iOS/Android
Metal Slug Infinity Original release date(s): March 14, 2019	Notes: Developed by and published by ekkorr; A tower defense game; Closed on September 30, 2021
Metal Slug: Commander Original release date(s): August 19, 2021	Release years by system: 2021 – iOS/Android
Metal Slug: Commander Original release date(s): August 19, 2021	Notes: Developed by SNK Hong Kong and published by SNK China; A card-based game; Closed on November 30, 2022
Metal Slug: Awakening Original release date(s): CHN: April 2023; SEA: August 2023; WW: July 2024	Release years by system: 2021 – iOS/Android; 2022 – iOS/Android/Windows (Steam) (worldwide)
Metal Slug: Awakening Original release date(s): CHN: April 2023; SEA: August 2023; WW: July 2024	Notes: Developed by TiMi Studios; Beta released in China in April 2021; Formerly known as Metal Slug Code: J; Chinese version of the mobile release published by Tencent Games; Southeast Asian version of the mobile release published by VNG Games; Released worldwide by HaoPlay
Metal Slug Tactics Original release date(s): WW: November 5, 2024	Release years by system: 2024 – Windows (Steam), Nintendo Switch, PlayStation 4, PlayStation 5, Xbox One, Xbox Series X/S
Metal Slug Tactics Original release date(s): WW: November 5, 2024	Notes: Developed by Leikir Studio and published by Dotemu; A turn-based tactics game

=== Compilations ===
Game	Details
Metal Slug: Collector's Edition Original release date(s): KOR: 2002	Release years by system: 2002 – Windows
Metal Slug: Collector's Edition Original release date(s): KOR: 2002	Notes: Includes Metal Slug, 2, X and 3
Metal Slug 4 & 5 Original release date(s): NA: May 24, 2005	Release years by system: 2005 – PlayStation 2, Xbox
Metal Slug Anthology Original release date(s): NA: December 14, 2006; EU: February 9, 2007; JP: February 22, 2007	Release years by system: 2006 – Wii; 2007 – PlayStation Portable, PlayStation 2; 2009 – Windows; 2015 – PlayStation 3; 2016 – PlayStation 4
Metal Slug Anthology Original release date(s): NA: December 14, 2006; EU: February 9, 2007; JP: February 22, 2007	Notes: Includes Metal Slug, 2, X, 3, 4, 5 and 6. Known as Metal Slug Collection PC on Windows
Metal Slug 1st & 2nd Mission: Double Pack Original release date(s): WW: September 15, 2021	Release years by system: 2021 – Nintendo Switch
Metal Slug Ultimate Collection Original release date(s): WW: 2027	Release years by system: 2027 – Windows (Steam), Nintendo Switch, Nintendo Switch 2, PlayStation 5, Xbox Series X/S
Metal Slug Ultimate Collection Original release date(s): WW: 2027	Notes: Includes Metal Slug, 2, X, 3, 4, 5, Metal Slug Advance, 6, 7 and Metal Slug Location Test Version.

=== Metal Slug Zero Online ===
Metal Slug Zero Online
- Developer: Dragonfly
- Publisher: SNK Playmore
- Series: Metal Slug
- Platform: Microsoft Windows
- Genre: Run and gun

Metal Slug Zero Online is an unreleased massively multiplayer online game, part of the Metal Slug series. It was being developed by Dragonfly and WizHands for SNK Playmore and was intended for the South Korean market. There was no word on a Japanese or North American release. The game was on course for a 2009 release, but in the summer of that year, developer Dragonfly suspended development of the game due to their belief that the game could not conform to the trend of current gaming industry.
