= List of arcade video games: M =

This is a list of arcade video games organized alphabetically by name. It does not include PC or console games unless they were also released in video arcades. See Lists of video games for related lists.

Title	Alternate Title(s)	Year	Manufacturer	Genre(s)	Max. Players	PCB Model
M-4	—	1977	Midway	Shooter		
M-79 Ambush	—	1977	Ramtek	Shooter		
M.A.C.H. 3	—	1983	Gottlieb	Shooter	1	
M.I.A. Missing in Action	—	1989	Konami	Run and gun	2	
M.V.P.	—	1989	Sega	Sports		
Ma Cheon Ru	—	1999	SemiCom			
Mace: The Dark Age	—	1997	Midway Games	Fighting game		
Mach Breakers	—	1995	Namco	Sports	2	
Macho Mouse	—	1982	Techstar			
Macross Plus	—	1996	Banpresto			
Mad Alien	—	1980	Data East	Fixed Shooter	2	
Mad Ball	—	1998	Yun Sung			
Mad Crasher	Mad Crusher	1984	SNK			
Mad Dog II: The Lost Gold	—	1992	American Laser Games	Shooting game		
Mad Dog McCree	—	1990	American Laser Games	Shooting game		
Mad Donna	—	1995	Tuning			
Mad Planets	—	1983	Gottlieb			
Mad Shark	—	1993	Allumer	Scrolling shooter	2	
Magic Fly	—	198?				
Magic Johnson's Fast Break	—	1989	Arcadia Systems	Sports	2	Arcadia
Magic Number	—	1995	CD Express			
Magic Premium	—	1995	CD Express			
Magic Purple	—	1996	Unico			
Magic Sticks	—	1995	Playmark			
Magic Sword	Magic Sword - Heroic Fantasy	1990	Capcom	Hack and slash	2	CPS1
Magic the Gathering: Armageddon	—	1997	Acclaim			
Magical Cat Adventure	Catt^{JP}	1993	Wintechno	Platformer	1	
Magical Crystals	—	1991	Kaneko			
Magical Date: Dokidoki Kokuhaku Daisakusen	—	1996	Taito			
Magical Date: Sotsugyou Kokuhaku Daisakusen	—	1997	Taito			
Magical Drop Plus 1!	—	1995	Data East		2	
Magical Drop II	—	1996	Data East		2	NeoGeo
Magical Drop III	—	1997	Data East		2	NeoGeo
Magical Error o Sagase	—	1994	TechnoSoft			
Magical Speed	—	1994	Namco		2	
Magical Spot	—	1980	Universal			
Magical Spot II	—	1980	Universal			
Magical Tetris Challenge	—	1998	Capcom	Puzzle	2	
Magical Touch	—	1995	Micro Mfg			
Magical Truck Adventure	—	1998	Sega			
Magical Twin Bee!	Twin Bee Yahhoo! Fushigi no Kuni de Dai Abare!!	1995	Konami			
Magical Zunou Power	—	1996	Sega			Sega ST-V
Magicball Fighting	—	1994	SemiCom			
Magix	—	1995	Yun Sung			
Magician Lord	Majishan Roodo ^{JP}	1990	Alpha Denshi	Platformer	2	
MagMax	—	1985	Nichibutsu	Scrolling shooter	2	
The Mah-Jong	—	1987	Visco	Mahjong video game	1	
Mahjong 4P Simasyo	—	1994	Sphinx	Mahjong video game	1	
Mahjong Angel Kiss	—	1995	Jaleco	Mahjong video game	1	
Mahjong Block Jongbou	—	1987	SNK	Mahjong video game	1	
Mahjong Block Jongbou 2	—	1987	SNK	Mahjong video game	1	
Mahjong Camera Kozou	—	1988	Miki Shoji	Mahjong video game	1	
Mahjong Campus Hunting	—	1990	Dynax	Mahjong video game	1	
Mahjong Channel Zoom in	—	1990	Jaleco	Mahjong video game	1	
Mahjong Chinmoku no Hentai	—	1990	Nichibutsu	Mahjong video game	1	
Mahjong Circuit no Mehyou	—	1992	Nichibutsu	Mahjong video game	1	
Mahjong Clinic: Vol. 1	—	1988	Home Data	Mahjong video game	1	
Mahjong Club 90's	—	1990	Nichibutsu	Mahjong video game	1	
Mahjong Dai-Reach	—	2001	Techno-Top	Mahjong video game	1	
Mahjong Daireikai	—	1989	Jaleco	Mahjong video game	1	
Mahjong Daiyogen: Kono Gyaru Uranaishi Ni Tsuki	—	1990	Video System	Mahjong video game	1	
Mahjong Derringer	—	1989	Dynax	Mahjong video game	1	
Mahjong Dial Q2	—	1990	Dynax	Mahjong video game	1	
Mahjong Doukyuusei	—	1995	Make Software	Mahjong video game	1	
Mahjong Doukyuusei Special Kanketsuhen	—	1995	Make Software	Mahjong video game	1	
Mahjong Dunhuang	—	1995	Spirit Tech	Mahjong video game	1	
Mahjong Erotica Golf: Soutennenshoku Gal	—	1994	Fujic Company	Mahjong video game	1	
Mahjong Fantastic Love	—	1996	Nakanihon	Mahjong video game	1	
Mahjong Fight Club	—	2002	Konami	Mahjong video game	1	
Mahjong Focus	—	1989	Nichibutsu	Mahjong video game	1	
Mahjong Friday	—	1989	Dynax	Mahjong video game	1	
Mahjong Fun-Club: Idol Saizensen	—	1989	Video System	Mahjong video game	1	
Mahjong G-Men '89: Satsusareta OL	—	1989	Nichibutsu	Mahjong video game	1	
Mahjong G-Taste	—	2002	Psikyo	Mahjong video game	1	
Mahjong Gakuen: Sotsugyohen	—	1988	Yuga	Mahjong video game	1	
Mahjong Gakuen 2: Gakuen-chou no Fukushuu	—	1989	Face	Mahjong video game	1	
Mahjong Gakuen-sai	—	1997	Make Software	Mahjong video game	1	
Mahjong Gakuen-sai 2	—	1998	Make Software	Mahjong video game	1	
Mahjong Gal 10-renpatsu: Naniwa no O-nee Wa O-Moroi De	—	1993	Fujic	Mahjong video game	1	
Mahjong Gal no Kaika	—	1989	Nichibutsu	Mahjong video game	1	
Mahjong Gottsu ee, Kanji!	—	1991	Nichibutsu	Mahjong video game	1	
Mahjong Hourouki Gaiden	—	1987	Home Data	Mahjong video game	1	
Mahjong Hourouki Okite	—	1988	Home Data	Mahjong video game	1	
Mahjong Hourouki Part I: Seisyun Hen	—	1987	Home Data	Mahjong video game	1	
Mahjong Housoukyouku Honbanchuu	—	1994	Nichibutsu	Mahjong video game	1	
Mahjong Hyper Reaction	—	1995	Sammy Corporation	Mahjong video game	1	
Mahjong Hyper Reaction 2	—	1997	Sammy Corporation	Mahjong video game	1	
Mahjong Ikagadesuka: 2 Haku 3 Nichi no Ianryoku	—	1991	Mitchell	Mahjong video game	1	
Mahjong Janjan Baribari	—	1992	Nichibutsu	Mahjong video game	1	
Mahjong Jikken Love Story	—	1991	Nichibutsu	Mahjong video game	1	
Mahjong Jogakuen: Karada Kensa-hen	—	199?	Windom	Mahjong video game	1	
Mahjong Jongoh	—	2000	Techno-Top	Mahjong video game	1	
Mahjong Kakumei	—	1990	Jaleco	Mahjong video game	1	
Mahjong Kakumei 2: Princess League	—	1992	Jaleco	Mahjong video game	1	
Mahjong Keiba ou	—	1993	Nichibutsu	Mahjong video game	1	
Mahjong Kinjirareta Asobi: Ikeike! Kyoushi no Yokubou	—	1991	Home Data	Mahjong video game	1	
Mahjong Koi no Magic Potion	—	1992	Nichibutsu	Mahjong video game	1	
Mahjong Koiuranai	—	1992	Nichibutsu	Mahjong video game	1	
Mahjong Kokuryu	—	2008	Techno-Top	Mahjong video game	1	
MahJong Kyoretsuden: Higashi Nippon-Hen	—	1990	SNK	Mahjong video game	2	NeoGeo
Mahjong Kyoujidai: Exciting Mahjong	—	1986	Sanritsu	Mahjong video game	1	
Mahjong L'Amant	—	1993	Nichibutsu	Mahjong video game	1	
Mahjong Lemon Angel	—	1990	Home Data	Mahjong video game	1	
Mahjong Nanpa Story	—	1989	Brooks	Mahjong video game	1	
Mahjong Natsu Monogatari	—	1989	Video System	Mahjong video game	1	
Mahjong Neruton Haikujiradan	—	1990	Dynax	Mahjong video game	1	
Mahjong Nigiri Itcho!!	—	2007	Techno-Top	Mahjong video game	1	
Mahjong OH	—	1999	Taito	Mahjong video game		Taito G-Net
Mahjong Pachinko Monogatari	—	1992	Nichibutsu	Mahjong video game	1	
Mahjong Panic Stadium	—	1990	Nichibutsu	Mahjong video game	1	
Mahjong Pon Chin Kan	—	1991	Visco	Mahjong video game	1	
Mahjong Quest	—	1991	Taito	Mahjong video game	1	
Mahjong Raijinhai DX	—	1996	Dynax	Mahjong video game	1	
Mahjong Reach	—	1994	Dynax	Mahjong video game	1	
Mahjong Reach II	—	1994	Dynax	Mahjong video game	1	
Mahjong Ren-ai Club	—	1993	Fujic	Mahjong video game	1	
Mahjong Rokumeikan	—	1988	Home Data	Mahjong video game	1	
Mahjong Satsujin Jiken	—	1988	Nichibutsu	Mahjong video game	1	
Mahjong Scout Man: Senyu!! AV Satsuei Genba	—	1994	Sphinx	Mahjong video game	1	
Mahjong Senka	—	1986	Visco	Mahjong video game	1	
Mahjong Shikaku	—	1988	Nichibutsu	Mahjong video game	1	
Mahjong Shikaku Gaiden: Hana no Momoko-gumi	—	1988	Nichibutsu	Mahjong video game	1	
Mahjong Shinkirou Deja Vu	—	1989	Dynax	Mahjong video game	1	
Mahjong Shinkirou Deja Vu 2	—	1989	Dynax	Mahjong video game	1	
Mahjong Shiseikatsu: Onzouji-ke no Hitobito	—	1991	Dynax	Mahjong video game	1	
Mahjong Shiyou	—	1986	Visco	Mahjong video game	1	
Mahjong Sisters	—	1986	Toaplan	Mahjong video game	1	
Mahjong Super Marukin-ban	—	1990	Yuga	Mahjong video game	1	
Mahjong Sweet Academy	—	2000	Techno-Top	Mahjong video game	1	
Mahjong Tenhou	—	2002	Techno-Top	Mahjong video game	1	
Mahjong Tensinhai	—	1995	Dynax	Mahjong video game	1	
Mahjong The Lady Hunter: Kaitou Kuroneko Renmeihen	—	1990	Nichibutsu	Mahjong video game	1	
Mahjong The Mysterious World Returns	—	1997	Dynax	Mahjong video game	1	
Mahjong Tian Jiang Shen Bing	—	1997	IGS	Mahjong video game	1	
Mahjong Tokkyuu Kaiten-ban Part 2	—	1991	Dynax	Mahjong video game	1	
Mahjong Triple Wars	—	1990	Nichibutsu	Mahjong video game	1	
Mahjong Triple Wars 2	—	1990	Nichibutsu	Mahjong video game	1	
Mahjong Triple Wars Bangai-hen: Sailor Wars	—	1993	Nichibutsu	Mahjong video game	1	
Mahjong Uchuu yori Ai o Komete	—	1989	Nichibutsu	Mahjong video game	1	
Mahjong Uranai Densetsu	—	1992	Nichibutsu	Mahjong video game	1	
Mahjong Vanilla Syndrome	—	1991	Nichibutsu	Mahjong video game	1	
Mahjong Vitamin C: Anataga Sensei Yo!	—	1989	Home Data	Mahjong video game	1	
Mahjong Wakuwaku Catcher	—	1993	Nichibutsu	Mahjong video game	1	
Mahjong Yarunara	—	1991	Dynax	Mahjong video game	1	
Mahjong Yoshimoto Gekijou	—	1994	Nichibutsu	Mahjong video game	1	
Mahjong Yougo no Kisotairyoku	—	1989	Home Data	Mahjong video game	1	
Mahjong Yuugi	—	1990	Visco	Mahjong video game	1	
Mahjong Zuki no Korinai Menmen	—	1988	Nichibutsu	Mahjong video game	1	
Maikobana	—	1990	Nichibutsu	Hanafuda game	1	
Maimai	—	2012	Sega	Rhythm game	2	
Main Event (1984)	—	1984	SNK	Sports/Professional wrestling	4	
The Main Event (1988)	Ring no Ohja ^{JP}	1988	Konami	Sports/Professional wrestling	4	
Major Havoc	Alpha One (prototype title)	1983	Atari	Shoot 'em up	2	
Major League	—	1986	Sega		2	
Major Title	—	1990	Irem	Sports	4	
Major Title 2 - Tournament Leader	The Irem Skins Game	1992	Irem			
Make Trax	Crush Roller ^{JP} Korosuke Roller	1981	Kural		2	
Maldaliza	—	2002	Big A Korea			
Malzak	—	198?	Kitronix			
Mang-Chi	—	2000	Afega			
Mambo a Go Go	—	2001	Konami	Rhythm game		
Manhattan	—	1981	Data East			DECO
Mania Challenge (2-Player)	—	1985				
Maniac Square	—	1996	Gaelco			
Manic Panic Ghosts	Pokasuka Ghost: It's a Boo Bash!	2007	Sega			
Manx TT Superbike	—	1995	Sega			Sega Model 2A
Mamoru-kun Ha Norowareteshimatta!	—	2008	G.Rev			NAOMI GD-ROM
Mappy	—	1983	Namco	Platform game	2	
Marbella Vice	—	1994	Picmatic			
Marble Madness	—	1984	Atari Games	Platform game	2	
Märchen Maze	—	1988	Namco	Action	2	Namco System 1
Marine Boy	—	1982	Orca			
Marine Date	—	1981	Taito			
Mario Bros.	—	1983	Nintendo R&D1	Platformer	2	
Mario Kart Arcade GP	—	2005	Namco	Racing	4	Triforce
Mario Kart Arcade GP 2	—	2007	Bandai Namco Games	Racing	4	Triforce
Mario Kart Arcade GP DX	—	2013	Bandai Namco Games	Racing	4	
Mario & Sonic at the Rio 2016 Olympic Games Arcade Edition	—	2016	Sega	Sports	4	Sega Nu
Mario & Sonic at the Olympic Games Tokyo 2020 - Arcade Edition	—	2020	Sega	Sports	4	
Markham	—	1983	Sun Electronics	Scrolling shooter	2	
Mars	—	1981	Artic Electronics			
Mars Matrix: Hyper Solid Shooting	—	2000	Takumi Corporation	Scrolling shooter	2	CPS2
Martial Beat	—	2002	Konami			
Martial Champion	—	1993				
Martial Masters	—	2001	IGS			
Maru-Chan de Goo!	—	1997	Sega			Sega ST-V
Marvel Land	—	1989	Namco	Platformer	2	
Marvel Super Heroes	—	1995	Capcom	Fighting	2	CPS2
Marvel Super Heroes vs. Street Fighter	—	1997	Capcom	Fighting	2	CPS2
Marvel vs. Capcom: Clash of Super Heroes	—	1998	Capcom	Fighting	2	CPS2
Marvel vs. Capcom 2: New Age of Heroes	—	2000	Capcom	Fighting	2	
Marvin's Maze	ACW	1983	SNK	Platform game	2	
Masked Riders Club Battle Race	—	1993	Banpresto			
Master Boy (Gaelco)	—	1991	Gaelco			
Master Boy (Ichi-Funtel)	—	1987	Ichi-Funtel			
The Master of KIN	—	1988	Du Tech			
Master of Weapon	—	1989	Taito			
Master's Fury	—	1996	Unico			
Master's Golf	—	1985	Nasco			
Mat Mania	Exciting Hour – The Prowrestling Network	1985	Technōs Japan	Sports	2	
Match'em Up	—	1986	Merit			
Match Games	—	1982	Merit			
The Mating Game	—	1996	Barcrest			
Mausuke no Ojama the World	—	1996	Data East			Sega ST-V
Max RPM	—	1986	Bally Midway			
Maximum Force	—	1996	Atari Games	Shooting gallery	2	
Maximum Speed	—	2003	Sammy Corporation			
Mayday!!	—	1981	Hoei			
Mayhem 2002	—	1985	Cinematronics			
Maze of Flott	—	1989	Taito			
The Maze of the Kings	—	2002	Sega			NAOMI GD-ROM
Mazan: Flash of the Blade	—	2002	Namco			NAOMI cart.
Mazer Blazer	—	1983	Stern Electronics			
Mazinger Z	—	1994	Banpresto			
Meadows Lanes	—	1977	Meadows Games			
Mechanized Attack	—	1989	SNK			
Mega Double Strip	—	1992	Blitz System			
Mega Lines	—	1991	Fun World			
Mega Twins	Chiki Chiki Boys	1990	Capcom			
Mega Man: The Power Battle	Rockman: The Power Battle ^{JP}	1995	Capcom	Action	2	CPS / CPS2
Mega Man 2: The Power Fighters	Rockman 2: The Power Fighters ^{JP}	1996	Capcom	Action	1	CPS2
Mega Zone	—	1983	Konami	Scrolling shooter	2	
Megablast	—	1989	Taito	Scrolling shooter	2	
Megadon	—	1982	Epos			
Megatack	—	1980	Centuri			
Megatouch 5	—	1997	Merit			
Megatouch 5 Tournament Edition	—	1998	Merit			
Megatouch 5 Turnier Version	—	1998	Merit			
Megatouch 6	—	1998	Merit			
Megatouch 7: Encore Edition	—	2000	Merit			
Megatouch III	—	1995	Merit			
Megatouch III Tournament Edition	—	1995	Merit			
Megatouch III Turnier Version	—	1996	Merit			
Megatouch IV	—	1995	Merit			
Megatouch IV Tournament Edition	—	1995	Merit			
Megatouch XL	—	1997	Merit			
Megatouch XL 5000	—	1997	Merit			
Megatouch XL 6000	—	1999	Merit			
Megatouch XL Gold	—	2000	Merit			
Megatouch XL Super 5000	—	1998	Merit			
Meijinsen	—	1986	SNK			
Meikyuujima	—	1988	Irem			
Melty Blood - Act Cadenza ver. A	—	2005	Type Moon			NAOMI GD-ROM
Melty Blood - Act Cadenza ver. B	—	2006	Type Moon			NAOMI GD-ROM
Melty Blood Actress Again	—	2008	Type Moon			NAOMI cart
Meng Hong Lou	—	2004	Sealy			
Mercs	Senjo no Okami II ^{JP}	1990	Capcom		2	CPS1
Merit Joker Poker	—	1988	Sammy Corporation			
Merit Touch Joker Poker	—	1994	Sammy Corporation			
Merlins Money Maze	—	1986	Zilec-Zenitone			
Meta Fox	—	1989	Seta			
Metal Black	—	1991	Taito	Scrolling shooter	2	
Metal Clash	—	1985	Data East	Beat 'em up	2	
Metal Freezer	—	1989	Seibu Kaihatsu			
Metal Hawk	—	1988	Namco	Multidirectional shooter	1	
Metal Saver	—	1994	First Amusement			
Metal Slug	—	1996	Nazca	Run and gun	2	NeoGeo
Metal Slug 2	—	1998	SNK	Run and gun	2	NeoGeo
Metal Slug 3	—	2000	Noise Factory	Run and gun	2	NeoGeo
Metal Slug 4	—	2002	Mega Enterprise	Run and gun	2	NeoGeo
Metal Slug 5	—	2003	SNK Playmore	Run and gun	2	NeoGeo
Metal Slug 6	—	2006	SNK Playmore	Run and gun	2	Atomiswave
Metal Slug X	—	1999	SNK	Run and gun	2	NeoGeo
Metal Soldier Isaac II	—	1985	Taito			
Metamorphic Force	—	1993	Konami	Beat 'em up	4	
Metamoqester	Oni - The Ninja Master	1995	Banpresto	Fighting	2	
Meteors	—	1981	Amusement World			
Metro-Cross	—	1985	Namco	Action	2	
Michael Jackson's Moonwalker	—	1990	Sega	Beat 'em up	3	
Micon-Kit	—	1978	SNK			
Micon-Kit Part II	—	1978	SNK			
Midnight Landing	—	1987	Taito			
Midnight Resistance	—	1989	Data East	Run and gun		
Midnight Run: Road Fighter 2	—	1985	Konami			
Mighty Guy	—	1986	Nichibutsu			
Mighty Monkey	—	1982	Universal Video Games			
Mighty Warriors	—	199?	Elettronica Video-Games			
Mikie	Shinnyuushain Tooru-Kun	1984	Konami			
Mighty! Pang	—	2000	Mitchell Corporation	Mahjong game	2	CPS2
Millipede	—	1982	Atari	Fixed shooter	2	
Minasan no Okagesama Desu! Dai Suguroku Taikai	—	1991	SNK	Mahjong video game	2	NeoGeo
Minefield	—	1983	Stern Electronics		2	
Minesweeper	—	1977	Amutech			
Mini Vegas	—	1983	Entertainment Enterprises	Card game		
Mini-Boy 7	—	1983	Bonanza	Card game		
Minivader	—	1990	Taito			
Minky Monkey	—	1982	Technos			
Minna de Kitaeru Zenno Training	—	2006	Namco Bandai Games			
Miracle Derby: Ascot	—	1988	Home Data			
Mirage Youjuu Mahjongden	—	1994	Mitchell			
Mirai Ninja	—	1988	Namco	Beat 'em up	2	
Mirax	—	1985	Current Technologies			
Miss Bingo	—	1994	Min			
Miss Mahjong Contest in Yakuman Daigaku	—	1989	Nichibutsu			
Miss Puzzle	—	1994	Min			
Miss Puzzle (Adult version)	—	1994	Min			
Miss World '96 Nude	—	1996	Comad			
Miss World 2002	—	2002	Daigom Games			
Missile Command	—	1980	Atari	Shoot 'em up	2	
Missile-X	—	1977	Taito			
Mission 660	The Alphax Z	1986	Taito			
Mission Craft	—	2000	Sun			
Mission-X	Zoar	1982	Data East	Scrolling shooter	2	
Mister Viking	—	1984	Sega			
Miyasu Nonki no Quiz 18-kin	—	1992	EIM			
MJ2	—	2003	Sega	Mahjong video game		
MJ3	—	2005	Sega	Mahjong video game		
MJ3 Evolution	—	2007	Sega	Mahjong video game		
Mobile Suit Gundam	—	1993	Banpresto			
Mobile Suit Gundam: Gundam VS. Gundam	—	2008	Banpresto			
Mobile Suit Gundam EX Revue	—	1994	Banpresto			
Mobile Suit Gundam SEED: Federation VS ZAFT	—	2005	Capcom			
Mobile Suit Gundam: Gundam vs. Gundam Next	—	2009	Namco			
Mobile Suit Z Gundam: AEUG Vs. Titan	—	2003	Capcom			
Mobile Suit Z Gundam: AEUG Vs. Titan DX	—	2004	Capcom			
Mocap Boxing	—	2001	Konami	Sports		
Mocap Golf	—	2002	Konami	Sports		
Moero!! Pro Yakyuu Homerun	—	1988	Jaleco	Sports		
Moeru Casinyo	—	2002	Altron			NAOMI GD-ROM
Moguchan	—	1982	Orca			
Mogura Desse	—	1991	Konami			
Mole Attack	—	1982	Yachiyo Electronics			
Mole Hunter	—	1979	Data East		2	
Momoko 120%	—	1986	Jaleco	Platformer	2	
Monaco GP	—	1979	Sega			
Money Idol Exchanger	—	1997	Face		2	NeoGeo
Money Money	—	1983	Zaccaria			
Monkey Ball	—	2001	Sega			NAOMI GD-ROM
Monkey Magic	—	1979	Nintendo	Bat and ball		
Monkey Mole Panic	—	1992	Taito			
Monster Bash	—	1982	Sega			
Monster Farm Jump	—	2001	Tecmo			
Monster Maulers	Kyukyoku Sentai Dandadarn ^{JP}	1993	Konami			
Monster Slider	—	1997	Visco			
Monster Zero	—	1982	Nihon Game Company			
Monte Carlo	—	1979	Atari	Racing	1	
Monza GP	—	1981	Olympia			
Moon Alien	—	1979	Nichibutsu			
Moon Alien Part 2	—	1980	Nichibutsu			
Moon Base	—	1979	Nichibutsu			
Moon Base Zeta	—	1981	Nichibutsu			
Moon Cresta	—	1980	Nichibutsu	Fixed shooter	2	
Moon Patrol	—	1982	Irem	Scrolling shooter	2	
Moon Quasar	—	1980	Nichibutsu	Fixed shooter	2	
Moon Raker	—	1980	Nichibutsu	Fixed shooter	2	
Moon Shuttle	—	1981	Nichibutsu	Scrolling shooter	2	
Moon War	—	1981	Stern	Scrolling shooter	2	
Moonquake	—	1987	Sente	Action	2	
More More	—	1999	SemiCom			
More More Plus: Puzzle Express	—	1999	SemiCom			
Moriguchi Hiroko no Quiz de Hyuu! Hyuu!	—	1995	Taito			
Mortal Kombat	—	1992	Midway	Versus fighting	2	
Mortal Kombat II	—	1993	Midway	Versus fighting	2	
Mortal Kombat 3	—	1995	Midway	Versus fighting	2	
Mortal Kombat 4	—	1997	Midway	Versus fighting	2	
Mosaic (Space)	—	1990	Space			
Mosaic (F2 System)	—	1999	F2 System			
Moto Frenzy	—	1992	Atari Games	Racing	1	
Moto GP	—	2007	Namco			
Motocross Go!	—	1997	Namco			
Motogonki	—	198?	Terminal	Racing game		
Motor Raid	—	1997	Sega			
MotoRace USA	Traverse USA ^{US} Zippy Race ^{JP}	1983	Irem	Racing	2	
Motos	—	1985	Namco	Action	2	
Moujya	—	1996	Etona			
Mouse Shooter GoGo	—	1995	Metro			
Mouse Trap	—	1981	Exidy	Maze	2	
Mouser	—	1983	UPL	Platform	2	
Mr. Do!	—	1982	Universal	Maze	2	
Mr. Do's Castle	Mr. Do! vs. Unicorns	1983	Universal	Platform	2	
Mr. Do's Wild Ride	—	1984	Universal	Platform	2	
Mr. Driller	—	1999	Namco	Puzzle	2	
Mr. Driller 2	—	2000	Namco	Puzzle	2	
Mr. Driller G	—	2001	Namco	Puzzle	2	
Mr. Goemon	—	1986	Konami	Platform	2	
Mr. Kicker	—	2001	SemiCom			
Mr. Kougar	—	1984	ATW			
Mrs. Dynamite	—	1982	Universal			
Ms. Pac-Man	—	1981	Bally Midway	Maze	2	
Muchi Muchi Pork!	—	2007	Cave	Scrolling shooter		
Mug Smashers	—					
MuHanSeungBu	—					
Multi 5	—	1998	Yun Sung	Multi game		
Multi Champ	—	1998	ESD			
Multi Champ Deluxe	—	1999	ESD			
Munch Mobile	Joyful Road	1983	SNK			
Musapey's Choco Marker	—	2002	Ecole			NAOMI GD-ROM
Musashi Ganryuki	Ganryu	1999	Visco	Beat 'em up / Platform game	2	NeoGeo
Muscle Bomber Duo: Ultimate Team Battle	Muscle Bomber Duo: Heat Up Warriors ^{JP}	1993	Capcom	Fighting	4	
Muscle Master	—	1997	Inter Geo			
Muscle Ranking: Kinniku Banzuke Spray Hitter	—	2000	Konami			
Mushihimesama	—	2004	AMI	Shoot 'em up	2	
Mushihimesama Futari	—	2006	AMI	Shoot 'em up	2	
Mushihimesama Futari Black Label	—	2007	AMI	Shoot 'em up	2	
Mushihimetama	—	2008	AMI	Shoot 'em up	2	
MushiKing - The King of Beetle 2K3 2nd	—	2003	Sega	Collectible Card		NAOMI cart.
MushiKing II	—	2005	Sega	Collectible Card		NAOMI cart.
MushiKing IV	—	2006	Sega	Collectible Card		NAOMI cart.
Mushiking The King Of Beetles 2006 First	—	2006	Sega	Collectible Card		
Mushiking The King Of Beetles 2006 Second	—	2006	Sega	Collectible Card		
Mustache Boy	—	1987	Seibu Kaihatsu	Puzzle	2	
Mutant Fighter	Death Brade	1991	Data East	Fighting	2	
Mutant Night	—	1987	UPL		2	
Mutation Nation	—	1991	SNK	Beat 'em up	2	NeoGeo
MX5000	Flak Attack	1987	Konami	Scrolling shooter	2	
My Hero	Seishun Scandal	1985	Sega	Beat 'em up	2	
Mysterious Stones	—	1984	Technōs Japan	Adventure	2	
Mystic Marathon	—	1983	Williams	Racing	2	
Mystic Riders	Mahou Keibitai Gun Houki	1992	Irem	Scrolling shooter	2	
Mystic Warriors	—	1993	Konami	Beat 'em up	4	
