= Monte Carlo (disambiguation) =

Monte Carlo is an administrative area of Monaco, famous for its Monte Carlo Casino gambling and entertainment complex.

Monte Carlo or Montecarlo may also refer to:

== Places ==
- Monte Carlo Casino, Monte Carlo, Monaco
- Montecarlo, Tuscany, a town in Italy
- Montecarlo, Misiones, a town in Argentina
- Montecarlo, West Virginia, a coal town in the US
- Monte Carlo, Santa Catarina, a city in Brazil
- Monte Carlo Resort and Casino, a luxury hotel rebranded as Park MGM on the Las Vegas Strip, United States
- Monte Carlo (San Marino), a mountain with a monument to Gianni Widmer in San Marino

== Sports ==
- Monte Carlo Rally, a rallying event organized by the Automobile Club de Monaco
- Monte-Carlo Masters, a tennis tournament
- Monte Carlo Open (golf), a defunct European Tour tournament (1984–1992)
- C.D. Monte Carlo, a football club in Macau
- Circuit de Monaco, a street circuit for Formula One automobile racing

== Transportation ==
- Chevrolet Monte Carlo, an American automobile
- Lancia Montecarlo, an Italian automobile
- Monte Carlo (yacht), a 1988 motor yacht
- Several models of Saab cars;
  - Saab 96 Monte Carlo, 1960s with tuned two stroke engine
  - Saab 900 Monte Carlo and
  - Saab 9-3 Monte Carlo, limited editions in yellow color
- Mega Monte Carlo, a French sports car
- Tatra 601 Monte Carlo, a Czech sports car

== Arts and entertainment ==
- Monte Carlo (arcade game), a 1979 racing game made by Atari
- Monte Carlo (musical), an 1896 West End musical by Howard Talbot
- Monte Carlo (radio programme), a Danish radio program
- Monte Carlo (solitaire), a solitaire card game
- "Monte Carlo" (song), a 2004 song by The Verve
- Monte Carlo (video game), a 1987 computer game
- CX 20 Radio Monte Carlo, a Uruguayan radio station

=== Film and television ===
- Monte Carlo (1921 film), a German silent film directed by Fred Sauer
- Monte Carlo (1925 film), a French silent film
- Monte Carlo (1926 film), an American romantic comedy silent film
- Monte Carlo (1930 film), an Ernst Lubitsch musical comedy
- Monte Carlo (2011 film), an American romantic comedy film starring Selena Gomez, Leighton Meester and Katie Cassidy
- Monte Carlo (miniseries), a 1986 TV miniseries starring Joan Collins
- Monte Carlo TV, a Uruguayan television channel

== Science and technology ==
- Monte Carlo method, a class of computational algorithms
- Monte Carlo integration, a method of numerical integration
- Monte Carlo option model, an option valuation model using Monte Carlo methods
- Monte Carlo algorithm, a randomized algorithm
- Monte Carlo localization, an algorithm for robots to localize
- Monte Carlo molecular modeling, the application of Monte Carlo methods to molecular problems
- Monte Carlo method in statistical physics, the application of Monte Carlo methods to statistical physics
- Monte Carlo methods in finance, the application of Monte Carlo methods to finance

== People ==
- Sophia Montecarlo (born 1986), former contestant on the reality show Born Diva
- Monte Carlo (composer) (1883–1967), Danish-born Broadway composer and author

== Other uses ==
- Monte Carlo (biscuit), a biscuit trademark owned by Arnott's Biscuits Holdings
- Monte Carlo stock, a style of rifle buttstock
- Monte Carlo Fashions Limited, Indian clothing retailer
