= Metal Slug (2006 video game) =

- Developer: SNK Playmore
- Publisher: SNK Playmore
- Director: Hiroshi Hishikawa
- Producer: Keiko Ijū
- Designers: Tatsuo Kajimoto; Hijiri; Zumi; 326
- Programmer: Hiroshi Hishikawa
- Composer: Toshikazu Tanaka
- Series: Metal Slug
- Platform: PlayStation 2
- Release: JP: June 29, 2006
- Genres: Run and gun, third-person shooter
- Mode: Single player

Metal Slug (メタルスラッグ, Metaru Suraggu), also called Metal Slug 3D (メタルスラッグ3D) to distinguish it from the original Metal Slug, is a third-person shooter run and gun video game developed and published by SNK Playmore for the PlayStation 2. It is a spin-off of the Metal Slug series and is the first game of the series to be presented in 3D. None of the original Metal Slug team were involved with the title.

The game had no definite title when it was first unveiled in Tokyo Game Show in 2004. In E3 of 2005, SNK Playmore revealed the game to be called Metal Slug: Evolution, but it was later changed to just Metal Slug.

The game was released only in Japan on June 29, 2006 due to mostly negative reviews from critics. Despite this, it contains texts and menus that are mostly in English, as well as English voice acting. Japanese subtitles and dialogue are also available.

== Plot ==
The game takes place in the year 2032, a year after Metal Slug 5 and before Metal Slug 7. Series antagonist General Morden becomes allies with Oguma, president of Oguma Enterprises and world leader of technology. Because this alliance could only stand to further strengthen Morden's military power, Marco Rossi, Fio Germi, Tarma Roving, and Eri Kasamoto set out to dissolve both parties. Recurring boss character Allen O'Neil also returns to oppose the player.

== Gameplay ==
Metal Slug maintains many features from the 2D entries; characters use an arsenal of various guns, grenades and explosives, and vehicles. The game also introduces full three-dimensional movement to the series to coincide with its 3D presentation, which uses super deformed characters.

Upgrades and customization are some of the largest new features. Players can upgrade each character's combat abilities, categorized into Pellet, Power, Hit Rate, and Machine. These abilities allow characters to increase the damage, "splash" radius, and accuracy of their weapons and vehicle handling, respectively. Each character begins with a full proficiency in different categories. For example, Marco starts off with a full Hit Rate skill while Fio starts with a completely upgraded Pellet skill.

Another new feature is a grade system, which ranks the player according to their performance on each of the game's 11 levels. Achieving the highest rank, the S rank, allows the player to collect medals, which are used for upgrading character attributes.

Playing through the game also awards Skill Points to the player, which can be used to upgrade 4 other abilities, which affect the amount of damage a character can withstand, their ability to evade enemy attacks, and more.

The game also includes the option to customize the titular Metal Slug to their own liking, with the ability to switch out its "core", treads, weapons, and armor. An in-game laboratory can be used to build custom parts for the vehicle.

== Reception ==
Metal Slug has received mixed reviews. NTSC-uk gave the game a 2 out of a possible 10, citing its poor graphics, barren environments, and overall boring gameplay. Edge scored a 5/10: "It's a glimpse of something special waiting to happen, of a no-nonsense attitude towards combat that could be developed into a series worthy of the torch that it has chosen to bear".
