= Metal Slug Anthology =

2006 video game

- North American box art
- Developer: Terminal Reality (Note: Original games developed by SNK Playmore and its respective co-developers, including Noise Factory and Nazca Corporation.)
- Publishers: SNK Playmore; Ignition Entertainment (EU)
- Designer: Steve Mallory
- Series: Metal Slug
- Engine: SNK's Neo Geo MVS arcade hardware
- Platforms: PlayStation 2, PlayStation Portable, PC, Wii
- Release: Wii: NA: December 14, 2006; AU: March 26, 2007; EU: March 30, 2007; JP: December 27, 2007; KOR: June 19, 2008; PSP: EU: February 9, 2007; NA: February 20, 2007; JP: February 22, 2007; PlayStation Store (PSP): NA: October 1, 2009; JP: August 17, 2009; PlayStation 2: NA: March 27, 2007; JP: May 5, 2007; EU: July 6, 2007; PC: EU: November 27, 2009; PlayStation Store: JP: August 19, 2015 (PS3); NA: July 5, 2016 (PS4); EU: September 20, 2016 (PS4)
- Genres: Scrolling shooter, run and gun, arcade
- Modes: Single-player, multiplayer

Metal Slug Anthology (Note: Known in Japan as Metal Slug Complete (Japanese: メタルスラッグコンプリート, Hepburn: Metaru Suraggu Konpurīto)) is a video game compilation for the PlayStation 2, PlayStation Portable, PC and the Wii. The Wii version boasts different controller configurations, most taking advantage of the Wii Remote, with the Japanese version supporting the Classic Controller and all regional variants supporting the GameCube controller. The game also marks the return of SNK Playmore as a third-party developer for a Nintendo console since the SNES era.

The graphics are virtually the same as the original versions released on arcade (and the more recent titles published on the PS2 and Xbox). The only major change is that all games now display at a converted 480i resolution (compared to the standard 240p). Cooperative gameplay is enabled on the console versions of the game, while the PSP version has a wireless mode so that two people can play together and work as a team.

A downloadable version was made available on PlayStation Store for the PSP on October 1, 2009. Metal Slug Anthology was then released on PC in 2009 under the name Metal Slug Collection PC. However, this version offers less content and an alternative menu interface. The PlayStation 2 version was also released on PlayStation Store for the PlayStation 3 and PlayStation 4 in 2015 and 2016, respectively.

== Included titles ==
- Metal Slug (1996)
- Metal Slug 2 (1998)
- Metal Slug X (1999)
- Metal Slug 3 (2000)
- Metal Slug 4 (2002)
- Metal Slug 5 (2003)
- Metal Slug 6 (2006)

Metal Slug 1-5 and X are the home console games running via Neo Geo AES emulation, while 6 is a ported version of the arcade game.

== Included features ==
Metal Slug 1-6 and X are included in the release, and the games have not been altered in any way. This is the same with the characters and abilities, which have all been kept the same, but the game's manual erroneously states that the 'slide' ability is achievable in Metal Slug 4, 5, and 6 — Metal Slug 4 and 6 do not include this feature in either the arcade or console version.

== Extra features ==
The game includes several special features:

- Art Gallery - Concept art of Metal Slug 1 to 6.
- Wallpapers - PSP-only option. A collection of wallpapers that can be copied to the Memory Stick.
- Sound Gallery - Music from Metal Slug 1 to 6. The PSP version includes an option that allows the player to copy the music to the Memory Stick as Atrac3+ format audio files with the proper track name and album tags.
- Game Options - Including difficulty, lives (which can be limited or unlimited, if they are limited the amount of lives the player has depends on the difficulty) and a rapid-fire option for all games except Metal Slug 6.
- Interview - A readable interview with some of the games' designers and programmers about the Metal Slug series itself.

== Reception ==
Reception

Aggregate scores
Aggregator	Score
GameRankings	Wii: 74% PSP: 78% PS2: 81%
Metacritic	Wii: 73/100; PSP: 78/100; PS2: 80/100

Review score
Publication	Score
GameSpot	8.2/10

The Metal Slug Anthology received positive reviews, but was criticized for its lack of Classic Controller support on the Wii version's Western releases.
