= Metal Slug 7 =

2008 video game

- Nintendo DS Cover art
- Developers: Noise Factory (Note: With assistance from Digital Hearts.),SNK Playmore
- Publishers: JP: SNK Playmore; NA: Ignition Entertainment; AU: All Interactive Distribution
- Director: Nobuhisa Shinoda
- Producer: Keiko Iju
- Artist: TONKO
- Series: Metal Slug
- Platform: Nintendo DS
- Release: JP: July 22, 2008; NA: November 18, 2008; EU: February 27, 2009; AU: October 29, 2009
- Genre: Run and gun
- Mode: Single-player

Metal Slug 7 (Note: Japanese: メタルスラッグ 7, Hepburn: Metaru Suraggu 7) is a run and gun video game developed by SNK Playmore for the Nintendo DS. It is the seventh and final title in the main Metal Slug series. It marks the first game in the main series that would be released without an arcade version. The game was released in 2008 for Japan on July 22 and North America on November 28 by Ignition Entertainment.

== Story ==
Several years following the events of Metal Slug 4, 5, 3D and Advance, the Peregrine Falcon Strike Force, the SPARROWS, and the Ikari Warriors are once again on a search for General Morden and his army, this time on a giant island landfill that has been converted into a military fortress, in order to stop his latest coup d'état. After having his newest weapon crushed by the heroes, Morden receives unexpected help when a time portal opens up and high-tech soldiers from the future appear to pledge their support. With their advanced technology, Morden is able to further fortify his base, but the heroes push forward despite the incredible odds.

At the very end, the heroes are able to destroy the time portal and cut off the Rebel Army's suppliers. Morden escapes in a giant mechanical Kraken and confronts them over a lake of molten lava. After a long and arduous battle, Morden is defeated and his weapon begins to sink into the lava. The heroes capture Morden and escape via helicopter, but he escapes when the Martians attack the helicopter. The final scene shows the heroes chasing Morden and his men off into the sunset.

== Gameplay ==
There are seven levels and three difficulties: Beginner, Normal and Hard. Metal Slug 7 uses the Nintendo DS touchscreen as a map of the level, making it easier for the player to look at the level and where to get power ups or captured prisoners. The usual weapons make their return from the series including a new weapon called "Thunder Shot", which fires a homing electric blast to the enemy.

== Soundtrack ==
The music in the game was composed by Toshikazu Tanaka, following on from his work on Metal Slug 4, Metal Slug 5, and Metal Slug 3D.

== Metal Slug XX ==
Metal Slug XX
- Developer: SNK Playmore
- Publishers: PSP: JP: SNK Playmore; NA: Atlus USA; EU: DHM Interactive; Xbox 360; SNK Playmore; PlayStation 4/Windows; SNK Corporation
- Series: Metal Slug
- Platforms: PlayStation Portable, PlayStation 4, Xbox 360, Microsoft Windows
- Release: PSP: JP: December 23, 2009; NA: February 23, 2010; EU: June 25, 2010; Xbox 360; May 19, 2010; PlayStation 4: NA: May 29, 2018; PAL: May 30, 2018; JP: May 31, 2018; Windows; January 31, 2019
- Genre: Run and gun
- Modes: Single-player, Multiplayer

A revised version of Metal Slug 7, titled Metal Slug XX, (Note: Pronounced as Metal Slug Double X.) was released on December 23, 2009 in Japan and North America on February 23, 2010 by Atlus USA for the PlayStation Portable. This version of the game features additional content, including co-op multiplayer and downloadable content. Metal Slug XX was released on Xbox Live Arcade for Xbox 360 on May 19, 2010; it was made backwards compatible on Xbox One on November 12, 2015. The PlayStation 4 version came worldwide in May 2018. Metal Slug XX was released for Microsoft Windows via Steam in January 2019.

== Reception ==
Reception

Aggregate score
Aggregator	Score		
Aggregator	DS	PSP	Xbox 360
Metacritic	70/100	67/100	61/100

Review scores
Publication	Score		
Publication	DS	PSP	Xbox 360
1Up.com	B−	N/A	N/A
Edge	6/10	N/A	N/A
Eurogamer	7/10	N/A	6/10
Famitsu	28/40	29/40	N/A
Game Informer	N/A	6.75/10	N/A
GamePro	N/A	3.5/5	N/A
GameRevolution	3/10	N/A	N/A
GameSpot	7.5/10	N/A	6/10
GameZone	7.6/10	7/10	N/A
IGN	7/10	N/A	6.5/10
Nintendo Power	7.5/10	N/A	N/A
Official Xbox Magazine (US)	N/A	N/A	7/10
Pocket Gamer	3.5/5	N/A	N/A
PlayStation: The Official Magazine	N/A	3.5/5	N/A
Teletext Gamecentral	6/10	N/A	6/10

Metal Slug 7 and the PSP and Xbox 360 versions received "mixed or average reviews" according to the review aggregation website Metacritic. In Japan, Famitsu gave it a score of two sevens, one eight, and one six for the original Metal Slug 7, and 29 out of 40 for the PSP version of Metal Slug XX.
