= MS6 =

MS6, or similar, may refer to:

- Efini MS-6, a Japanese automobile
- Metal Slug 6, a video game
- Mississippi Highway 6
- Mississippi's 6th congressional district
- The Masked Singer (American season 6), an American television series
