= Bakumatsu-den =

Bakumatsu-den refers to something taking place in the Bakumatsu period. It may refer to:

- Bakumatsuden, a manga by Ken Ishikawa
- Fu-un Bakumatsu-den
- Mouse Bakumatsu-den
