= Metal Slug (1996 video game) =

1996 video game

- European arcade flyer
- Developer: Nazca Corporation (Note: Saturn version developed by Ukiyotei.)
- Publisher: SNK
- Producer: Takashi Nishiyama
- Designers: Kazuma Kujo; Meeher
- Programmers: Atsushi Kurooka; Kenji Andō; Shinichi Hamada
- Artists: Akio Oyabu; Kazuhiro Tanaka; Takeshi Okui
- Composer: Takushi Hiyamuta
- Series: Metal Slug
- Platforms: Arcade, Neo Geo AES, Neo Geo CD, Sega Saturn, PlayStation
- Release: April 19, 1996: Arcade; JP: April 19, 1996; NA: May 1996; EU: 1996 Neo Geo AES; JP/NA: May 24, 1996 Neo Geo CD; WW: July 5, 1996 Saturn; JP: April 4, 1997 PlayStation; JP: August 7, 1997
- Genre: Run and gun
- Modes: Single-player, multiplayer
- Arcade system: Neo Geo MVS

Metal Slug (Note: Japanese: メタルスラッグ, Hepburn: Metaru Suraggu; also known as Metal Slug: Super Vehicle-001 at the title screen) is a 1996 run and gun video game developed by Nazca Corporation and published by SNK for the Neo Geo arcade and home systems. Set in 2028, the game follows Peregrine Falcon Strike Force soldiers Marco Rossi and Tarma Roving as they seek to overthrow a coup d'état by the Rebel Army, led by Donald Morden.

Metal Slug was conceived by the same staff who created several titles at Irem that shared a similar presentation, such as In the Hunt and GunForce II. The core concept during development was a simple yet exciting side-scrolling shooter, with an easy control scheme and visuals inspired by the works of Hayao Miyazaki. Gameplay was originally more slow-paced, with players controlling the titular tank instead of soldiers across shorter, less complex missions with a darker atmosphere. The project was heavily overhauled after poor responses during location tests, and the game's length was extended at the request of SNK to make it more attractive to console players, while incorporating more platform elements into its design.

Upon its release, Metal Slug garnered mixed reviews, which lauded its sense of humor and fluid hand-drawn animation but criticized its short length and lack of replay value. The game proved highly popular in arcades and was subsequently ported to other platforms by third-party developers, with varying changes and additions from the arcade original. It was later included on compilations and re-released through download services for other systems. The game's success led to a franchise with multiple sequels, remakes and spin-offs, beginning with Metal Slug 2, released in 1998.

== Gameplay ==
Arcade version screenshot

Metal Slug is a run and gun game reminiscent of Contra where players assume the role of captain Marco Rossi and lieutenant Tarma Roving of the Peregrine Falcon Strike Force, shooting constantly at a continual stream of enemies in order to complete each mission. At this point, players confront a boss, who is usually considerably larger and tougher than regular enemies. On the way through each level, players can find numerous weapon upgrades and the eponymous tanks. Known as the SV-001 and SV-002, the tanks increase the player's offense and add considerably to their defense.

In addition to shooting, players can perform melee attacks by using a knife. The player does not die by coming into contact with enemies, and correspondingly, many of the enemy troops have melee attacks. Much of the game's scenery is destructible, and occasionally, this reveals extra items or power-ups. During the course of a level, the player encounters prisoners of war (POWs), who, if freed, offer the player bonuses in the form of random items or weapons. At the end of each level, the player receives a scoring bonus based on the number of freed POWs. If the player dies before the end of the level, the tally of freed POWs reverts to zero. Getting hit by enemy fire, colliding against solid stage obstacles or falling off-stage will result in losing a life and once all lives are lost, the game is over unless players insert more credits into the arcade machine to continue playing.

There are a total of six missions taking place across locations such as forests, garrisoned cities, snowy mountain valleys, canyons, and military bases. The vast majority of enemies are soldiers equipped with weaponry befitting their specific role. There are several mechanized enemies, such as tanks, mobile artillery, aircraft, armored personnel carriers and technicals. Much of the game's humor comes from how the enemies are depicted; the player often encounters them as they are sunbathing, roasting food over a fire, or conversing. They tend to scream loudly if they see the player, and often try to either run away or fight back.

== Development ==
Metal Slug was developed by most of the same team that previously worked on several projects at Irem, such as In the Hunt and GunForce II, before departing from the company and forming Nazca Corporation. Kawai and Takashi Nishiyama served as chief development manager and producer, respectively. Kazuma "Kire-Nag" Kujo and Meeher acted as co-designers. Shinichi "Hamachan" Hamada, Kenji "Andy" Andō, Atsushi Kurooka (currently of PlatinumGames), Tetsuya Yokota, H. Yamada and "Pierre" Takada worked as programmers. Artists Akio Oyabu, Susumu, Kazuhiro "Max.D" Tanaka, Tomohiro, Takeshi Okui and Kozo were responsible for the pixel art. Composer Takushi "Hiya!" Hiyamuta scored the soundtrack. The team recounted the project's development process and history through various publications.

Metal Slug was first playable during a location test at Osaka, and was later showcased to attendees at the 1995 Amusement Machine Show on September 13–15. The plot was similar to the final version, but revolved around Regular Army members Phil Gene and Michiko Nakajima controlling the SV-001 and SV-002 prototype tanks instead.

== Release ==
Metal Slug was first released by SNK for the Neo Geo MVS arcade system on April 19, 1996, followed by the Neo Geo AES on May 24. The North American AES release has since become one of the more expensive titles on the platform, with copies of the port fetching over US$20,000 on the secondary video game collecting market. On July 5, 1996, a Neo Geo CD version of the game was released, featuring a "Combat School" mode that allowed players to revisit previously-played missions with new objectives.

In Japan, the game was released on the Sega Saturn on April 4, 1997, followed by the PlayStation on August 7; the Saturn port was developed by SNK, while the PlayStation port was developed by Ukiyotei. Though the software market was increasingly dominated by polygon-based games, conversions of Neo Geo games to the Saturn and PlayStation had been selling well in Japan, motivating SNK to produce conversions for Metal Slug as well. To retain all the animations of the arcade version, the Saturn version uses newer compression techniques, inter-level loading, and a 1 MB RAM expansion cartridge. The Saturn port was available in two revisions: 1.002 and 1.005, which included some minor bug fixes. Both ports feature the "Combat School" mode from the Neo Geo CD release, while the PlayStation version features "Another Story", a new mode consisting of plot-based minigames, and an art gallery featuring concept art.

A Game Boy Advance port was announced to be in development, but was ultimately never released in favor of Metal Slug Advance. In 2006, Metal Slug was included alongside its arcade sequels as part of Metal Slug Anthology for the Wii, PlayStation 2 and PlayStation Portable. It was later released for PC in 2009 (as Metal Slug Collection PC), and later for the PlayStation 4 in 2020 by Limited Run Games; the latter version was an emulated iteration of the arcade version, without additional game modes or content featured in previous home releases. In 2008, Metal Slug was included as part of SNK Arcade Classics Vol. 1 for Wii, PlayStation 2 and PSP, and was also released by D4 Enterprise for the Wii's Virtual Console. In 2010, a version by M2 for the NEOGEO Station service was published by SNK Playmore on PlayStation Network. In 2012, a Wireless version was released by DotEmu for iOS and Android.

Metal Slug is available as one of the 20 pre-loaded games with the Neo Geo X, and was also included in the Neo Geo 25th Anniversary Humble Bundle, released in 2015. Hamster Corporation re-released the game as part of their ACA Neo Geo series for the PlayStation 4, Xbox One, Nintendo Switch, Windows, Android and iOS. The game was also recently included in the international version of the Neo Geo mini, the Neo Geo Arcade Stick Pro plug and play game device and the Neo Geo MVSX table top.

== Reception and legacy ==
Reception

Aggregate score
Aggregator	Score
GameRankings	85% (NG)

Review scores
Publication	Score
AllGame	3.5/5 (ARC); 3.5/5 (NG)
Computer and Video Games	3/5 (SS)
Electronic Gaming Monthly	7.25/10 (NG)
Eurogamer	7/10 (VC)
Famitsu	25/40 (SS)
IGN	8.5/10 (VC)
Jeuxvideo.com	19/20 (NG)
Next Generation	3/5 (SS)
Nintendo Life	8/10 (VC, NS)
Dengeki PlayStation	80/100, 75/100 (PS)
Sega Saturn Magazine	92% (SS)

Upon its initial appearance, Metal Slug received mixed reviews. The four reviewers of Electronic Gaming Monthly heavily criticized the game's unfair difficulty and one-hit deaths, remarking that playing through the arcade version requires an inordinate amount of quarters, while the Neo Geo AES version's lack of an option for limited continues means players of all skill levels can complete it in a single sitting, with no motivation to play again or improve one's skill at the game. However, the four reviewers also concurred that the game is fun, chiefly due to its smooth and humorous animations. GamePro agreed that the Neo Geo version suffers from low longevity, with too few levels and a complete lack of replay value, and also criticized the slowdown in the game, but approved of the graphics, music, and arsenal of weapons, and summarized the game as "a soldier-slamming, side-scrolling, tour de force that dwarfs recent side-scrolling Neo shoot-em-ups, including the system's strongest platform offerings like Cyber-Lip and Top Hunter."

American and European magazines reviewing the Sega Saturn port as an import praised it for being a faithful arcade conversion, but noted its low longevity. Computer and Video Games' Steve Rey praised the weapon selection, attention to detail, humor and two-player mode. Next Generation stated that "in the end, Metal Slug is not a game players will really obsess over. However, the easy and exciting gameplay will have players returning to it often, which is probably why SNK decided to bring it to the States." Readers of the Japanese Sega Saturn Magazine voted to give the Saturn iteration an 8.6305 out of 10 score, ranking at the number 185 spot. A reviewer of NowGamer criticized the PlayStation conversion for its lack of replay value aside from Combat School mode. However, he praised the gameplay for being fun in short-term.

In their issue from 1 June 1996, Japanese magazine Game Machine listed the game as the seventh most-popular arcade game for the previous two weeks. In the United States, it was one of the top ten highest-grossing arcade games of 1996. According to Famitsu, the "SNK Best Collection" re-release of Metal Slug on PlayStation sold over 8,064 copies in its first week on the market. The PC port sold 156,631 digital copies worldwide on Steam.

When Metal Slug was re-released on the Virtual Console in 2008, IGN's Lucas M. Thomas awarded it an "Editor's Choice" badge. Eurogamer's Dan Whitehead was not quite as impressed. Despite praising the original game, Whitehead was critical of the port, criticizing the lack of support for online multiplayer, in comparison to the Xbox Live release. Nintendo Life's Marcel van Duyn praised the sprite work, visuals and fast-paced music. Slide To Play's Andrew Podolsky commended the iOS release for being an enjoyable and fast-paced arcade shooter in addition to its visual presentation, but recommended Metal Slug 3 instead, as he noted that the title was more simple, shorter and lack the gameplay features compared with later entries in the Metal Slug franchise. 148Apps's Carter Dotson heavily criticized the iOS version for its control scheme but praised its graphics and sound, as well as the gameplay and replay value. Nintendo Life's Damien McFerran praised its graphics and humor, although McFerran noted that its overall simplicity compared to later titles in the Metal Slug series may be seen as a shortcoming.

In a retrospective review, AllGame's Brett Alan Weiss and Kyle Knight praised its unique hand-drawn visual style, refined gameplay, simple controls, intense action, humor and replay value but criticized the game's slowdown when many objects are present on-screen, the overall length and found the music to be average. Knight regarded the title as one of the best side-scrolling shooters on Neo Geo. Jeuxvideo.com's nuktos praised the colorful graphics, humor, gameplay and sound design but criticized its short length. It was included in the 2010 book 1001 Video Games You Must Play Before You Die.

Metal Slug spawned a series of six sequels, a remake and four spin-offs. Marco Rossi appears as a playable character in the tag-team fighting game NeoGeo Battle Coliseum. Several developers have also created games similar to Metal Slug such as Demon Front, CT Special Forces, Alien Hominid, Commando: Steel Disaster, Apocalypse Max: Better Dead Than Undead, and Mercenary Kings.
