= Dotemu =

French video game developer and publisher

Dotemu SAS
- Type: Subsidiary
- Industry: Video games
- Founded: 2007; 19 years ago
- Founders: Xavier Liard; Romain Tisserand
- Headquarters: Paris, France
- Key people: Cyrille Imbert (CEO)
- Parent: Focus Entertainment (2021–present)
- Divisions: The Arcade Crew
- Website: dotemu.com

Dotemu SAS (originally DotEmu SAS) is a French video game developer and publisher based in Paris, founded in 2007 by Xavier Liard and Romain Tisserand. It is best known for its ports, remasters and remakes.

== History ==
Dotemu was founded by Xavier Liard and Romain Tisserand in 2007. The company's offices are located in Paris, close to the Folies Bergère.

In April 2010, Dotemu launched a digital distribution service that would sell games without digital rights management, akin to Good Old Games. In March 2017, Dotemu announced that its online store would be closed down on 1 June that year. The company cited tough market competition and its focus shifting towards game development rather than game distribution.

In September 2015, Liard and Tisserand sold their company to an unnamed private investor. Later that month, they founded a new video game publisher, Playdigious (which would later publish Dotemu's games on mobile platforms). In October 2014, Cyrille Imbert was appointed as Dotemu's chief executive officer. In March 2018, Dotemu announced the creation of The Arcade Crew, a publishing label that would support small development teams.

In August 2021, the company was acquired by Focus Home Interactive (now Focus Entertainment) for approximately €38.5 million (US$46 million).

== List of video games ==
=== Games developed ===
Year	Title
2008	Nicky Boom
2008	Krypton Egg
2009	Ishar + Ishar 2
2009	Street Fighter II: Champion Edition
2009	Ishar Compilation
2009	Golvellius
2009	Nicky 2
2010	Gobliiins Pack
2010	Dráscula: The Vampire Strikes Back
2010	Raptor: Call of the Shadows
2010	R-Type
2010	Broken Sword: Shadow of the Templars – The Director's Cut
2010	Gobliiins
2010	Avenging Spirit
2011	Red Baron Pack
2011	The Last Express: Collectors Edition
2011	Earth Defense Force
2011	64th Street
2011	X-Men
2011	P47 Thunderbolt
2011	Irem Arcade Hits
2011	Rod Land
2011	Another World – 20th Anniversary Edition
2012	Metal Slug 3
2012	Final Fantasy VII
2012	The Last Express
2012	Rayman Jungle Run
2012	Raiden Legacy
2012	Metal Slug
2013	Metal Slug 2
2013	Metal Slug X
2013	The Last Express: Gold Edition
2013	Double Dragon Trilogy
2014	R-Type II
2014	Little Big Adventure
2014	Final Fantasy III
2014	Final Fantasy IV
2014	Sanitarium
2015	Heroes of Might & Magic III: HD Edition
2015	Ys Chronicles 1
2015	Battle Fantasia: Revised Edition
2015	Final Fantasy IV: The After Years
2015	Final Fantasy V
2015	Final Fantasy VI
2015	Final Fantasy VII
2015	Little Big Adventure: Enhanced Edition
2016	The King of Fighters 2000
2016	Shock Troopers
2016	The Last Blade
2016	Pulstar
2016	Fatal Fury Special
2016	Samurai Shodown V Special
2016	Ironclad
2016	Twinkle Star Sprites
2016	Garou: Mark of the Wolves
2016	Blazing Star
2016	Baseball Stars 2
2016	Art of Fighting 2
2016	Sengoku 3
2016	Real Bout Fatal Fury 2: The Newcomers
2016	I Have No Mouth, and I Must Scream
2016	Ys Chronicles II
2016	Pang Adventures
2016	Neo Turf Masters
2016	Shock Troopers: 2nd Squad
2017	Ys Origin
2017	King of the Monsters
2017	The King of Fighters 2002
2017	Samurai Shodown II
2017	Windjammers
2019	Final Fantasy VIII Remastered
2020	Streets of Rage 4
2021	Ghoul Patrol
2021	Zombies Ate My Neighbors
2022	Windjammers 2
2023	Might & Magic: Clash of Heroes: Definitive Edition
2026	Blasterbug: Last Bug Standing!

=== Games published ===
Year	Title	Developer
2017	Wonder Boy: The Dragon's Trap	Lizardcube
2019	Dark Devotion	Hibernian Workshop
2021	Young Souls	1P2P
2022	Teenage Mutant Ninja Turtles: Shredder's Revenge	Tribute Games
2023	Pharaoh: A New Era	Triskell Interactive
2024	Metal Slug Tactics	Leikir Studio
2025	Ninja Gaiden: Ragebound	The Game Kitchen
2025	Absolum	Guard Crush Games, Supamonks
2025	Marvel Cosmic Invasion	Tribute Games
2026	Battlestar Galactica: Scattered Hopes	Alt Shift
2026	Starship Troopers: Ultimate Bug War!	Auroch Digital
2027	Dungeons & Dragons: Long Rest Tavern	Homo Ludens
2027	Warhammer Age of Sigmar: Deathmaster	Old Skull Games
