= Apocalypse Max: Better Dead Than Undead =

2012 video game

- Developer: Wandake
- Platforms: iOS, Android
- Release: September 14, 2012
- Genre: platform/shooting game
- Mode: Single-player

Apocalypse Max: Better Dead Than Undead is a 2D platform/shooting mobile game developed by American game studio Wandake for iOS on September 14, 2012 and for Android on August 31, 2016. Apocalypse Max is an old school side-scrolling platform shooter set in a zombie wasteland. Its lead designer is Safal Kapoor, who later joined EA Games and is currently working with Miniclip Games as Head of design. The visual design and art was done by Alessandro Marroni, the developer of Undead End series. The game studio Wandake, which also developed the Robokill series, was part of the Indian tech company Sourcebits Digital and was acquired by the American company Ascendum in 2017.

One of the game's inspirations is the Metal Slug series, with similarities in its setting, combat style, and controls.

== Critical reception ==
Reception

Aggregate score
Aggregator	Score
Metacritic	84/100

Review scores
Publication	Score
Pocket Gamer	4/5
TouchArcade	4/5

The game received "favorable" reviews according to the review aggregation website Metacritic.
