= Montecarlo, West Virginia =

Community in West Virginia, US

Montecarlo
- Unincorporated community
- Location within the state of West Virginia Montecarlo (the United States)
- Coordinates: 37°30′58″N 81°21′42″W
- Country: United States
- State: West Virginia
- County: Wyoming
- Elevation: 1,798 ft (548 m)
- Time zone: UTC-5 (Eastern (EST))
  - Summer (DST): UTC-4 (EDT)
- GNIS ID: 1555152

Montecarlo is an unincorporated community and coal town in Wyoming County, West Virginia, United States.
