= Metal Slug 2 =

1998 video game

- Developer: SNK
- Publisher: SNK
- Producer: Takashi Nishiyama
- Designer: Meeher
- Programmers: Kenji Andō; Shinichi Hamada; Hirokun
- Artists: Akio Oyabu; Cannon; Fukunishi
- Composer: Takushi Hiyamuta
- Series: Metal Slug
- Platforms: Arcade, Neo Geo AES, Neo Geo CD
- Release: Arcade: JP: February 23, 1998; NA: March 1998; Neo Geo AES: JP: April 2, 1998; NA: 1998; Neo Geo CD: JP: June 25, 1998; NA: 1998
- Genre: Run and gun
- Modes: Single-player, multiplayer
- Arcade system: Neo Geo MVS

Metal Slug 2 (Note: Japanese: メタルスラッグ 2, Hepburn: Metaru Suraggu 2; also known as Metal Slug 2: Super Vehicle-001/II at the title screen) is a 1998 run and gun video game developed and published by SNK for the Neo Geo arcade and home platforms. It is the second installment in the Metal Slug series and the first to not be developed by Nazca Corporation, who developed the 1996 game Metal Slug, as they were acquired and absorbed into SNK. The original version of the game had extensive slowdown and performance issues, eventually leading SNK to release a modified version in 1999, titled Metal Slug X: Super Vehicle-001 (メタルスラッグX). It has been ported to the Neo Geo CD, PlayStation, Virtual Console, iOS and Android, and to the Wii, PlayStation Portable and PlayStation 2 (as part of the Metal Slug Anthology). The game added several new features to the gameplay of the original Metal Slug, such as new weapons, vehicles and the ability to transform the character. It received generally positive reviews and was followed by Metal Slug 3, released in 2000.

== Gameplay ==
One of the new weapons, the laser, being used on the Mars people

Gameplay in Metal Slug 2 is similar to the previous game; the player must shoot constantly at a continual stream of enemies in order to reach the end of each level. At this point, the player confronts a boss, who is usually considerably larger and tougher than regular enemies. On the way through each level, the player can find numerous weapon upgrades and "Metal Slug" tanks. The tank is known as the SV-001 ("SV" stands for Super Vehicle), which increases the player's offense and considerably adds to their defense.

In addition to shooting, the player can perform melee attacks by using a knife and/or kicking. The player does not die by coming into contact with enemies, and correspondingly, many of the enemy troops have melee attacks. Much of the game's scenery is destructible, and occasionally, this reveals extra items or power-ups.

During the course of a level, the player encounters prisoners of war (POWs), who, if freed, offer the player bonuses in the form of random items or weapons. At the end of each level, the player receives a scoring bonus based on the number of freed POWs. If the player dies before the end of the level, the tally of freed POWs reverts to zero.

Metal Slug 2 introduces the ability for characters to transform during the course of the game. As well as doubling the number of available player characters from two to four, Metal Slug 2 introduces in-game characters to help the player in battle. The first is Hyakutaro Ichimonji, a prisoner who, when rescued, will fight alongside the player, throwing Hadouken balls at enemies, or roundhouse kicking them if they get within melee range. Another character is Sgt. Rumi Aikawa, an army supplier who lacks a sense of direction, earning her the title "The Wandering Ghost"; she carries a huge, overstuffed backpack and drops random items for the player to collect (more are dropped if the backpack is shot or cut).

== Plot ==
Two years have passed since the end of Metal Slug, when Capt. Marco Rossi and Lt. Tarma Roving of Peregrine Falcon Strike Force defeated and killed the evil General Morden, who had staged a coup d'état against the worlds' governments. Various factions sympathetic to Morden have been in operation, but are considered insignificant. They have begun to act in unison, and army intelligence concludes that the only way this could happen is if Morden is still alive and is attempting a new coup. Rossi (now a Major) and Roving (now a Captain) are sent to once again battle Morden. They are accompanied by two members of the Intelligence Agency's Special Ops Squad S.P.A.R.R.O.W.S.; Sgt. Eri Kasamoto and Sgt. 1st Class Fiolina Germi.

As the levels unfold, it is revealed that Morden has formed an alliance with aliens in an effort to facilitate his plans (the previous game ended with one of Morden's soldiers sending a paper airplane into outer space). In the final mission, however, the aliens turn on Morden, attacking his troops and taking him prisoner. An ad hoc alliance is formed between the Peregrine Falcon Strike Force and General Morden's army to combat the greater alien threat. After a long battle, they succeed in defeating the alien mother ship. As the ship explodes, Morden falls to the ground, strapped to a solid iron plate. While his soldiers celebrate his survival, the plate loses its balance and crushes him. The game ends with Rossi, Roving, Kasamoto and Germi celebrating their victory.

== Metal Slug X ==
Metal Slug X: Super Vehicle-001
- Developers: SNK; Prosoft Corporation (PS1)
- Publisher: SNK
- Producer: Takashi Nishiyama
- Designer: Meeher
- Programmers: Andy; Hirokun; Nakatsuka
- Artists: Akio; Cannon; Kon. Kitakichine
- Composers: Takushi Hiyamuta; Yoshihiko Wada
- Series: Metal Slug
- Platforms: Arcade, Neo Geo AES, PlayStation
- Release: Arcade: JP: March 19, 1999; NA: March 1999; Neo Geo AES: JP: 27 May 1999; NA: 1999; PlayStation: JP: January 25, 2001; NA: April 24, 2001; EU: August 1, 2003
- Genre: Run and gun
- Modes: Single-player, multiplayer
- Arcade system: Neo Geo MVS

Metal Slug X screenshot, depicting a battle against Dragon Nosuke.

An upgraded version of Metal Slug 2, titled Metal Slug X, was released in March 1999 for the Neo Geo MVS. The game used a modified version of the engine from Metal Slug 3, which eliminated the slowdown problems of the original. In addition to increased difficulty, Metal Slug X introduced several changes to gameplay and presentation:

- Much of the music has been remixed or altered.
- A new announcer.
- Many stages have the time of day changed. Instead of individual levels being set at either day or night, the stages can take place at dusk, twilight, or sunset.
- It is now possible for the player character to become fat by collecting food items in every stage after Mission 2; in the original game, the obese transformation was only possible in Mission 4.
- All levels have increased enemy count, new enemy placements, different enemy characters and new boss placements.
- Vehicle types and locations are different.
- There are more power-ups, POWs, and items (particularly food) in each mission. These items are often hidden.
- Many environmental elements have different reactions when shot, such as exploding with unexpected results or randomly spewing out items or enemies.
- Stronger versions of the heavy machine gun, flamethrower, shotgun, laser rifle, and rocket launcher are available. Each deals more damage than their normal counterpart, has a different appearance and a wider (or longer) area of impact. If the player happens to be fat while using these heavier weapons, they appear differently and can cause even more damage.
- Several new weapons are included: Stones, Iron Lizard, Enemy Chaser, Super Grenade, Drop Shot, a new Golden Metal Slug, which is available in Mission 3, and the Armor piercer, available in Mission 4.
- Added Fio's death sound (in Metal Slug 2, she uses Eri's).
- New enemies are added or replaced, like the Mummy Dogs.
- The original art for Metal Slug is shown at the end of the game while the credits are rolling, instead of the black screen used in Metal Slug 2.

== Release ==
Home versions of Metal Slug 2 were released for the Neo Geo AES in April 1998, and the Neo Geo CD in June. The Neo Geo CD version features a "Combat School" mode (similar to the CD-ROM based versions of the previous game) where the player can play new versions of previously played missions with new objectives.

Metal Slug X was ported to the Neo Geo AES in May 1999 and the PlayStation in January 2001. The PlayStation version was released in North America and PAL regions by Agetec and features the same "Combat School" mode featured in the Neo Geo CD versions of the first two games.

In 2006, Metal Slug Anthology (titled Metal Slug Complete in Japan) was released for the Wii, PlayStation 2 and PSP. This compilation includes the original Metal Slug, and all of its arcade sequels (including Metal Slug 2 and Metal Slug X) up to Metal Slug 6. The games are emulated versions of the originals, with none of the additional game modes or content introduced in the other home versions.

The AES version of Metal Slug 2 was released in October 2008 for the Wii Virtual Console.

Both Metal Slug 2 and Metal Slug X were also included in Metal Slug Collection PC, which was released in Europe in 2009. In 2013, versions of both games were released for iOS and Android.

Hamster Corporation re-released the game as part of their ACA Neo Geo series for the PlayStation 4, Xbox One, Nintendo Switch, Windows, Android and iOS.

== Reception ==
Reception

Aggregate scores
Aggregator	Score
GameRankings	iOS: 77% (MSX) PS: 78%
Metacritic	iOS: 76/100 (MSX) PS: 85/100 (MSX) iOS: 68/100

Review scores
Publication	Score
Eurogamer	Virtual Console: 7/10 (MSX) PS: 8/10
GameRevolution	(MSX) PS: B
GameSpot	(MSX) PS: 8.2/10
IGN	Virtual Console: 7.5/10
Next Generation	(MSX) PS: 3/5
AppSpy	iOS: 4/5
Pocket Gamer	iOS: 7/10 (MSX) iOS: 7/10
148Apps	(MSX) iOS: 3.5/5

Upon their initial appearance, both Metal Slug 2 and Metal Slug X received generally positive reviews. Many of the subsequent ports and re-releases have received mixed reviews. For example, the iOS version of Metal Slug 2 holds an aggregate score of 77% on GameRankings, based on 5 reviews, and 76 out of 100 on Metacritic, based on 6 reviews.

The exhibition of Metal Slug 2 at the February 1998 AOU Show made a significant impact, with Sega Saturn Magazine reporting that "SNK proudly displayed what many felt was the game of the show - Metal Slug 2. Huge crowds gathered around the stand to take a look at one of the greatest sprite-based games they'd ever seen."

When Metal Slug 2 was released on the Virtual Console in 2008, IGN's Lucas M. Thomas scored it 7.5 out of 10. He was highly critical of the slowdown (a common criticism of the game when it was first released, and one of the major selling points for Metal Slug X), but praised other aspects: "It's still a pretty solid game on its own, and there's no denying it's both hilarious and filled to the brim with great run-and-gun action". Eurogamer's Dan Whitehead scored the game 7 out of 10, criticizing the price: "The Metal Slug Anthology collates seven games from the series on disc, and can now be bought for just over twice the price of this solitary offering. If you like frantic blasting and silly humour then I heartily recommend you seek out Metal Slug. Just don't feel obliged to do it via Virtual Console".

Eurogamer's Tom Bramwell scored the 2001 PlayStation version of Metal Slug X 8 out of 10. Although he felt the game was somewhat dated by current PlayStation standards, he concluded that "Metal Slug X is a fan-pleasingly simple update to the MS series, and to the rest of us it's the best game of its kind on the PlayStation". Game Revolution's Johnny Liu rated the game a B, writing "as there are fewer and fewer good Playstation games, let alone a quality port. You could do much worse these days". GameSpot's Ryan Davis scored it 8.2 out of 10, writing: "What really separates Metal Slug X from the rest of the crowd is its tongue-in-cheek presentation. For example, enemy soldiers laugh when you die but shriek in horror when they realize you've come back. Or when a certain midboss is defeated, his corpse falls off the screen and is devoured by a giant killer whale. This skewed sense of humor, combined with its frenzied gameplay, gives the game a unique flavor and makes it one of the best side-scrolling shooters out there". It was nominated for GameSpot's annual "Best PlayStation Game" and, among console games, "Best Game No One Played" prizes.

Scott Steinberg reviewed the PlayStation version of Metal Slug X for Next Generation, rating it three stars out of five, and stated that "a derivative but instantly endearing military shooter that earns its stripes".

In a retrospective review, Neo-Geo.com scored Metal Slug X 10 out of 10: "Metal Slug X is different enough in many small ways that if you're a completist, you'll still want MS2 in your collection. However, if you're simply looking for the best-playing game of the two, Metal Slug X outshines its closely related cousin with a simple formula of "more, more, and more". This really is 2D action gaming at its finest".

=== Commercial performance ===
In Japan, Game Machine listed Metal Slug 2 as being the third most successful arcade game of March 1998. Game Machine also listed Metal Slug X as the seventh most successful arcade game of April 1999.

The PlayStation port of Metal Slug X sold 95,103 copies in Japan, and 69,035 copies in the United States, for a total of 164,138 copies sold in Japan and the United States. The later PC port of Metal Slug X sold 229,374 digital copies worldwide on Steam, for a total of at least 393,512 Metal Slug X copies sold for the PlayStation and Steam platforms.
