= Metal Slug 4 =

2002 video game

- Developers: Mega Enterprise; Noise Factory; SNK Playmore (MVS,AES,Xbox)
- Publishers: Playmore: Arcade; KOR: MEGA; NA: BrezzaSoft Neo Geo AES; JP: Sun Amusement; NA: BrezzaSoft MEGA (Windows) PlayStation 2; JP/NA: SNK Playmore; EU: Ignition Entertainment Xbox; JP/NA: SNK Playmore; EU: Ignition Entertainment
- Producers: Hong Ick Cho; Keiko Iju
- Designers: Kazuki Ito; Masafumi Fujii
- Programmers: Hiroshi Hishikawa; Kazuaki Ezato
- Artists: Joo Hwan Sohn; Yong Hee Lee
- Composer: Toshikazu Tanaka
- Series: Metal Slug
- Platform: Arcade: Microsoft Windows, Neo Geo AES, PlayStation 2, Xbox
- Release: March 27, 2002: Arcade; JP: March 27, 2002; NA: May 2002 Neo Geo AES; WW: June 13, 2002 Windows; KOR: December 5, 2002 PlayStation 2; JP: September 22, 2004; NA: May 24, 2005; EU: October 28, 2005 Xbox; JP: February 24, 2005; NA: August 16, 2005; EU: November 4, 2005
- Genre: Run and gun
- Modes: Single-player, multiplayer
- Arcade system: Neo Geo MVS

Metal Slug 4 (Note: Japanese: メタルスラッグ 4, Hepburn: Metaru Suraggu 4) is a run and gun video game developed by Mega Enterprise and Noise Factory and published by Playmore for the Neo Geo arcade and home platforms. It was released in 2002 for the Neo-Geo MVS arcade platform, and is the fourth game in the Metal Slug series. Two years later, Playmore published Metal Slug 4 for consoles.

Metal Slug 4 retains the same gameplay as previous titles, with the addition of some enemies, bosses, weapons, several vehicles and a bonus combo system. It was ported to Xbox and PlayStation 2 as a stand-alone game in Japan and Europe, and along with Metal Slug 5 as a compilation in North America and South Korea. Hamster Corporation re-released the game as part of their ACA Neo Geo series for the PlayStation 4, Xbox One, Nintendo Switch, Windows, Android and iOS.

== Gameplay ==
Gameplay screenshot, showing Nadia and Trevor battling multiple enemies.

A bonus scoring system was added that allows the player to be rewarded depending on how many enemies are killed in the time allotted. The time allotted is determined from the type of emblem that is picked up. A time meter will appear on the top of the screen, and if the player lives through the end of the level, they will be awarded bonus points for badges that represent feats accomplished. Eri and Tarma were replaced with Nadia and Trevor.

== Plot ==
One year after the events of Metal Slug 3 and 6, the world is under the threat of a mysterious and deadly cyber virus that threatens to attack and destroy any nation's military computer system. With Tarma Roving and Eri Kasamoto unable to help out due to their own assignments in the matter, Marco Rossi and Fiolina Germi are called in to investigate the situation and are joined by two newcomers, Nadia Cassel and Trevor Spacey. In their investigation, the group discovers that a rich terrorist organization known as the Amadeus Syndicate is behind the plot and has allied with General Morden's Rebel Army. They head into battle against Amadeus' forces, hoping to destroy the cyber virus before it gets the chance to wipe out the entire world's military computer system.

Halfway through the game's story mode, the player is confronted by who they presume to be General Morden. In the final stage, they find an underground facility where android doubles of Morden are being manufactured. Allen O' Neil fights the player and is also revealed to be a machine replica. The player confronts the leader of the syndicate, a man tentatively called "Doctor", who attacks with a series of powerful robots, but he is defeated and is trapped in his own devices as the base self-destructs, killing him. If the player safely escapes the base's bonus explosion stage, the credits will show the main cast eating a feast of food, but if the player gets caught in the explosion, the player character will appear in the hospital, bandaged and bed-ridden, being brought get-well gifts of food from both Tarma and Eri. After the credits, a single computer monitor is seen transmitting data to an unknown location before shutting down.

== Reception ==
In Japan, Game Machine listed Metal Slug 4 as the second most successful arcade game of April 2002.

Metal Slug 4 was mixed to positive received by players with users scores of 7.8 for PS2, 7.3 for Xbox, 8.1 for Neo Geo and 8.3 for the arcade versions, while Metacritic and GameRankings are given with 70.47% and 70 along with Metal Slug 5 as compilation for both PS2 and Xbox score.

== Legacy and re-releases ==
An emulated port by Code Mystics was released for Microsoft Windows on the Prime Gaming service on April 20, 2023. This port was released on GOG.com on April 8, 2024.
