= Fu-un Bakumatsu-den =

2005 video game

- Developer(s): Genki (PS2); From Software (PSP)
- Publisher(s): Genki (PS2); From Software (PSP)
- Platform(s): PlayStation 2 PlayStation Portable
- Release: PlayStation 2: JP: January 20, 2005; PSP: JP: December 10, 2009
- Genre(s): Action
- Mode(s): Single-player

Fu-un Bakumatsu-den (風雲 幕末伝) is a Japanese PlayStation 2 game made in 2005 by Genki Co. as a follow-up to Fu-un Shinsengumi. In 2009, it was remade for the PlayStation Portable as Fu-un Shinsengumi -Bakumatsu-den- Portable (風雲 新撰組‐幕末伝‐portable) by From Software.

As in the previous game, the player takes the role of a member of the Shinsengumi militia force.

== Voice actors ==
- Daisuke Ono as Sakamoto Ryōma
- Yui Sakakibara as Ikumatsu

== Development ==
Yoji Shinkawa worked on the game by doing the artwork after his previous role as artist in Fu-un Shinsengumi.

The game was released in Korean by Mega Enterprise on May 5, 2005 with pre-orders in South Korea done between April 22 to May 1 with the first 500 pre-orders being awarded with the game OST.
