= Monster Maulers =

1993 video game

Monster Maulers (Kyukyoku Sentai Dadardarn)
- Japanese arcade flyer of Kyukyoku Sentai Dadardarn (Monster Maulers)
- Developer: Konami
- Publisher: Konami
- Director: Kengo Nakamura
- Producer: Masahiro Inoue
- Programmers: Tomo Yoshi; Yukihiro; Y•K 98; Tomohiro Ishimoto; Naotaka Yoshikawa
- Artists: Kengo Nakamura; Andy! Take P. Natsuji; Yasuhiro Noguchi; Hitomi Terada; Yuji Asano; Kanbanmusume
- Composers: Yoshihiko Koezuka (video game music); Masato Shimon (singer)
- Platform: Arcade
- Release: 1993
- Genre: Beat 'em up
- Mode: Up to two players simultaneously
- Arcade system: Mystic Warriors-based hardware

Monster Maulers, known in Japan as Kyukyoku Sentai Dadandarn (究極戦隊ダダンダーン, lit. "Ultimate Squad Dadandarn"), is a 1993 beat 'em up arcade game developed and published by Konami.

== Gameplay ==
The focus of the game is one-on-one fights against giant enemies. Several of said enemies are references to or bosses in other Konami games, such as Gradius and its spin-off, Salamander. When playing two-player mode, both players can team up to do secret special moves.

== Plot ==
The three main protagonists are Kotetsu, Anne, and Eagle, members of the "Ultimate Task Force". A trio of evil villains known as the Happy Droppers unleashes a swarm of monsters to terrorize countries of the world, sending the three heroes on a mission to end the disaster and defeat the evil masterminds.

There are two endings in the game. The good ending has the villains apprehended, while the bad ending shows them having escaped.

== Characters ==
=== Heroes ===
- Kotetsu – a fighter/brawler hailing from Japan, he is the balanced-type character.
- Anne – a martial artist hailing from England, her abilities match both speed and skill.
- Eagle – a pro-wrestler hailing from America (in the Japanese version, his origin is unknown), he is the power-type character.

=== Monsters ===
- Dragon – a giant dragon that can change different colors with elements (red for fire, white for ice, and blue for lightning) for his breath attacks; he also blocks attacks to his head with his elf-fins. His stage is a cave with a visible statue of Baphomet in Norway.
- Fungus (known as Slime in Japan) – a gooey monster with gills for eyes who lives under the sea. He attacks mostly by bouncing around as a ball and stretching his arms, and he can also absorb his opponents into his body. His stage is a nicely detailed underwater grotto featuring an abnormally large Dunkleosteus-like fish in Bermuda.
- Centaur – a red-armored centaur who attacks with a large bladed yo-yo type shield as a weapon as well as by kicking. His stage is a temple in Iraq.
- Diablo (known as Furaiki in Japan) – a Chinese storm demon, most of his attacks utilize a certain kind of elemental power, like shooting fireballs and also using a spinning tornado kick. His stage is a pagoda in China.
- Spider Wort (known as Hydrante in Japan) – a carnivorous plant that attacks by eating its opponents. Its stage is the Amazon rainforest in Brazil.
- Moai – a living Easter Island head with a torso and arms. He uses these limbs to pull himself around, uses punches, attacks with ripple lasers and is able to deflect energy blasts. His stage is an underground temple in Brazil.
- Serpent (known as Mother in Japan) – a snake-like collection of organs, its stage is a gory biological area in Kenya.
- Brainy (known as Brain Golem in Japan) – a floating brain with tentacles and a bulging eye, he uses his long arms to grab his opponents and throws them; he also fires laser beams and energy balls from his eye. His stage is a gory biological area in Kenya.

=== The Happy Droppers ===
- Ducker – a walking robot piloted by Mr. Chin, the mad scientist of the Happy Droppers, he uses his robot to attack by shooting a flamethrower and by kicking. His stage is on top of the Happy Droppers ship.
- Robo-Ape (known as Mecha Gorilla in Japan) – a giant robot gorilla piloted by Garuga, the strong brute of the Happy Droppers, he fights like any gorilla does, like swinging punches, and fires missiles. His stage is inside the Happy Droppers ship factory.
- Cosmic Tank (known as Happy Buster Ace in Japan) – a pink chair tank with a drill and claw piloted by Happy, the leader of the Happy Droppers; she attacks by dropping bombs, uses the drill and claw, and teleports around. Her stage is the Happy Droppers ships control room. She serves as the game's final boss.

== Other appearances ==
- Kotetsu and Anne from Monster Maulers make a brief cameo in the interactive game TwinBee PARADISE in Donburishima.
- Anne from Monster Maulers makes an appearance as a photo in the puzzle game Pixel Puzzle Collection.

== Reception ==
In Japan, Game Machine listed Monster Maulers on their February 1, 1994 issue as being the fourth most-successful table arcade unit of the month.
