= Mad Shark =

1993 video game

- Arcade flyer
- Developer: MOSS
- Publisher: Allumer
- Platform: Arcade
- Release: JP: January 1993
- Genre: Scrolling shooter
- Modes: Single-player, multiplayer

Mad Shark (Note: Japanese: マッドシャーク, Hepburn: Maddo Shāku) is a 1993 vertically scrolling shooter video game developed by MOSS and published by Allumer for arcades. It was released in Japan only in January 1993. It is the first game to be developed by MOSS, formed by former Seibu Kaihatsu employees, hence its gameplay resembles that of the Raiden series. Hamster Corporation acquired the game's rights alongside Allumer's portfolio, releasing the game outside Japan for the first time as part of their Arcade Archives series for the Nintendo Switch and PlayStation 4 in August 2023.

== Gameplay ==
The player controls a fighter plane which travels through various levels and defeats enemies. Bombs and power-ups are available that allow the player to increase their firepower and quickly vanquish enemies, including wider spread of bullets, homing attacks and missiles.
