= Metal Slug Tactics =

2024 video game

- Developer: Leikir Studio
- Publisher: Dotemu
- Composer: Tee Lopes
- Series: Metal Slug
- Engine: Unity
- Platforms: Microsoft Windows; Nintendo Switch; PlayStation 4; PlayStation 5; Xbox One; Xbox Series X/S
- Release: November 5, 2024
- Genre: Turn-based tactics
- Mode: Single-player

Metal Slug Tactics is a turn-based tactics video game developed by Leikir Studio and published by Dotemu. A spin-off of the Metal Slug series, the game was released on November 5, 2024 for Microsoft Windows, Nintendo Switch, PlayStation 4, PlayStation 5, Xbox One, Xbox Series X and Series S.

== Gameplay ==
Unlike other games in the series, Metal Slug Tactics is played from an isometric perspective.

Unlike older Metal Slug titles which are run and gun video games, Metal Slug Tactics is a turn-based tactics game played from an isometric perspective. The world map is divided into regions with each culminating in a boss fight. Each region is further divided into several missions that players can complete in any order. Each mission has their own distinct objectives and rewards, and players must prioritize the resources they need while choosing which mission to tackle. The game introduces a structure commonly found in roguelike games. While individual squad members can be revived with reinforcement points during battle, players will be returned to the outpost if all characters are defeated, and must start the campaign again. At the outpost, players can upgrade the skills of each character, improve their weapons with mods, and purchase new items and weapons from vendors.

Players can choose three characters of the Peregrine Falcons squad for each mission. Each character has a primary weapon, which has unlimited ammo, a secondary weapon with limited ammo, and a distinct skill. Activating special abilities consume adrenaline, which is generated through movement in the battlefield, and attacking enemies. The game adopted a grid-based movement, and players have two action points for each turn, one for movement while the other for performing an action. Enemies will attempt to attack the player in their turn, though they can hide behind cover to boost their defense. The more a player character moves in their turn, the higher their defense. By strategically placing characters in the battlefield, players can line up sync attacks. By attacking an opponent that is also within the line of sight of another character, a second attack by the other character will be triggered automatically. Players can also make use of environmental hazards to inflict damage on their enemies. Occasionally, players can deploy a tank into the battlefield, which allows the player to do devastating damage to enemies. Depending on the amount of fuel available, a tank can attack enemies with its weapon multiple times in a turn.

== Development ==
Following the success of games such as Wonder Boy: The Dragon's Trap and Streets of Rage 4, SNK invited Dotemu to revive one of its dormant franchises. Metal Slug was chosen as it is one of the few franchises owned by SNK that is not a fighting game. Leikir Studio, which is based in Paris, served as the game's lead developer. Leikir pitched the project to SNK in 2018, and full development of the game commenced in 2019. SNK was not directly involved in the game's development, though it gave Leikir access to all the assets of the older Metal Slug games. However, the assets were not usuable in Tactics due to the change in gameplay perspective. Into the Breach served as an important inspiration for the studio, and paying homage to the franchise's action roots, the gameplay is speed-oriented despite being turn-based. The team introduced a variety of difficulty options for both fans of the turn-based tactics series, and players of the older games who are not familiar with this style of gameplay.

The game was officially announced by Dotemu in June 2021. Initially set to be released in 2023, the game's release date was subsequently delayed to late 2024 for Microsoft Windows, Nintendo Switch, PlayStation 4, PlayStation 5, Xbox One, Xbox Series X and Series S.

== Reception ==
Reception

Aggregate scores
Aggregator	Score
Metacritic	PS5: 79/100; Win: 78/100
OpenCritic	67% recommend

Review scores
Publication	Score
GamesRadar+	3.5/5
Hardcore Gamer	4/5
IGN	8/10
PC Gamer (US)	76/100
Push Square	8/10
Shacknews	8/10

Metal Slug Tactics received "generally favorable" reviews from critics, according to the review aggregator website Metacritic. OpenCritic determined that 68% of critics recommended the game.

Charlie Wacholz from IGN praised Metal Slug Tactics for its faithful adaptation, impressive pixel art, and engaging soundtrack. He noted that while the movement-focused gameplay and mechanics were strong, bugs and quality-of-life issues hindered the experience. Despite this, the game brought innovative elements to the tactics genre. Likewise, Abbie Stone from GamesRadar+ commended Metal Slug Tactics for its engaging gameplay and art style but noted that limited tutorials and technical issues, including crashes, affected its overall reception.
