= Gianni Widmer =

Italian aviator

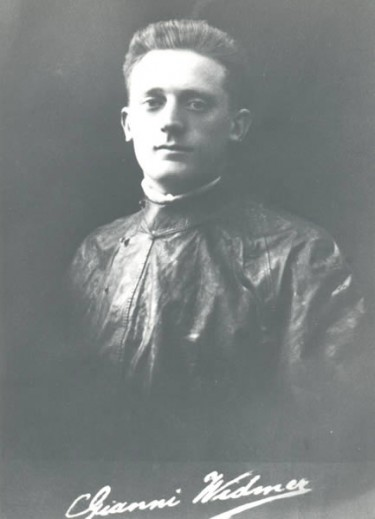
Gianni Widmer

Ivan Vidmar (April 25, 1892 in Trieste, then in Austro-Hungarian Empire – October 30, 1971 in Milan, Italy) (Italian: Gianni Widmer) was an Italian civil and military aviator of Slovenian descent, a pioneer of airmail.

He was interred at the cemetery of S. Anna in Trieste.

== Noted achievements ==
On September 24, 1911, he flew from Venice to Trieste across the Adriatic Sea in 1h 15 min.

There is a monument to Ivan Vidmar in San Marino on the mountain of Monte Carlo (Fiorentino commune) to commemorate his landing there on April 16, 1913. It was authored by sculptor Carlo Reffi, inscription by Pietro Franciosi. It is the second monument to an aviator (the first one being to Alberto Santos-Dumont in Paris, France). He was also awarded the San Marino Gold Medal of Civil Merit of first class for this feat.
