= Mega Enterprise =

Defunct video game companies of South Korea

MEGA Enterprise Co., Ltd. 메가엔터프라이즈
- Company type: Private
- Industry: Video games
- Founded: 1998
- Defunct: 2007
- Fate: Bankruptcy; Amid suspicions of corruption in special military service, company officials disappeared, stopped all services provided, and suddenly closed down
- Headquarters: Yeongdeungpo-gu, Seoul, South Korea
- Key people: Lee Sang-Min (President)
- Products: Arcade games

Mega Enterprise (Korean: 메가엔터프라이즈) or also MEGA, was a South Korean company that specialised in developing video games. It was formerly located at Yeongdeungpo-gu in Seoul.

Mega Enterprise was best known for publishing and porting some of video game titles developed by Data East and Technōs Japan to the PC for the Korean market, as well as having developed two arcade-only games: Pull Trigger (released in 2003), and Metal Slug 4 with Noise Factory for the Neo Geo after the original developer, SNK, went bankrupt.

In South Korea, Mega also published PC and PS2 games from companies like Activision (for the first), and SNK Playmore (instead for the second). It also developed Metal Slug Online game for PC.

== History ==
Mega was established in Yeongdeungpo-gu in 1998.

The company closed in 2007 amidst allegations of corruption.

== Games published by MEGA ==
All games listed for each platform are published only in South Korea.

=== Arcade ===
- Metal Slug 4 (2002) - co-developed with Noise Factory and Playmore
- The King of Fighters 2003 (2003)
- Metal Slug 5 (2003) - co-developed with Noise Factory and SNK Playmore
- Power Instinct Matrimelee (2003)
- Pull Trigger (2003)
- Rage of the Dragons (2002) - co-developed with Evoga Entertainment
- SNK vs. Capcom: SVC Chaos (2003)
- Time Crisis 3 (2003)
- Tekken 5 (2004)

=== Personal computer (PC) ===
- Super Dodge Ball (2001)
- Call of Duty (2003)
- Day of Defeat (2003)
- Empires: Dawn of the Modern World (2003)
- X2: Wolverine's Revenge (2003)
- Call of Duty: United Offensive (2004)
- Medieval: Total War (2004)
- Shrek 2 (2004)
- Spider-Man 2 (2004)
- Zwei: The Arges Adventure (2004; developed by Falcom in 2001)

=== PlayStation 2 ===
- Tenchu: Wrath of Heaven (2003)
- Metal Slug 3 (2003)
- The King of Fighters 2001 (2004)
- Fu-un Shinsengumi (2004)
- Kaidō Battle 2: Chain Reaction (2004)
- Kengo 3 (2004)
- KOF: Maximum Impact (2004)
- SNK vs. Capcom: SVC Chaos (2004)
- Starsky & Hutch (2004)
- Fu-un Bakumatsu-den (2005)
- The King of Fighters 2002/2003 (2005)

=== Mobile phone ===
- Catch the Crab
- Zwei!!

=== Web Online ===
- KongKong Online
- Poporu
- TOOJI Online
