= Metal Slug 3 =

2000 video game

- North American arcade flyer
- Developer: SNK: Noise Factory (PS2) DotEmu (Mobile/PC) Code Mystics (PSN)
- Publishers: SNK: PlayStation 2; JP: Playmore; KOR: MEGA; PAL: Ignition Entertainment Xbox; NA/JP: SNK Playmore; EU: Ignition Entertainment
- Producer: Takashi Nishiyama
- Designers: Akio Oyabu; Meeher; Narusawa
- Programmers: ABA; Kenji Andō; Dramania Hide
- Artists: Cannon; Curry; Susumu
- Composers: Masato Horiuchi; Takushi Hiyamuta; Yoshihiko Wada
- Series: Metal Slug
- Platform: Arcade: Neo Geo AES, PlayStation 2, Xbox
- Release: March 23, 2000: Arcade; JP: March 23, 2000; NA: April 2000 Neo Geo AES; JP: June 1, 2000; NA: September 17, 2001 PlayStation 2; JP: June 19, 2003; KOR: August 14, 2003; EU: November 5, 2004 Xbox; NA: May 25, 2004; JP: June 24, 2004; EU: November 5, 2004
- Genre: Run and gun
- Modes: Single-player, multiplayer
- Arcade system: Neo Geo MVS

Metal Slug 3 (Note: Japanese: メタルスラッグ 3, Hepburn: Metaru Suraggu 3) is a 2000 run and gun video game developed and published by SNK for the Neo Geo arcade and home systems. It is the sequel to Metal Slug 2/Metal Slug X. The music of the game was developed by Noise Factory.

The game adds several features to the gameplay of the original Metal Slug and Metal Slug 2, such as weapons and vehicles, as well as introducing branching paths into the series. It received generally positive reviews.

== Gameplay ==
Arcade version screenshot, showing Eri riding the Slugnoid to battle Huge Hermit.

The gameplay mechanics are the same as in previous Metal Slug games; the player must shoot constantly at a continual stream of enemies in order to reach the end of each level. At this point, the player confronts a boss, who is usually considerably larger and tougher than regular enemies. On the way through each level, the player can find numerous weapon upgrades and "Metal Slug" tanks. The tank is known as the SV-001 ("SV" stands for Super Vehicle), which increases the player's offense and considerably adds to their defense.

In addition to shooting, the player can perform melee attacks by using a knife and/or kicking. The player does not die by coming into contact with enemies, and correspondingly, many of the enemy troops have melee attacks. Much of the game's scenery is destructible, and occasionally, this reveals extra items or power-ups.

During the course of a level, the player encounters prisoners of war (POWs), who, if freed, offer the player bonuses in the form of random items or weapons. At the end of each level, the player receives a scoring bonus based on the number of freed POWs. If the player dies before the end of the level, the tally of freed POWs reverts to zero.

A new feature in Metal Slug 3 is the branching path system; in most missions, there are forking paths from which the player must choose one, each with their own obstacles, and each of varying length and difficulty. All paths eventually lead to the same boss battle, but the player may have different equipment, and may have rescued more or fewer POW's depending on their choice of path.

== Plot ==
Several years ago, the evil General Morden was foiled in his attempted coup d'état against the worlds' governments by the Peregrine Falcon Strike Force. After forming an alliance with an alien race in an attempt to stage another coup, Morden was betrayed and taken prisoner by his newfound allies. His rebels troops formed an ad hoc alliance with the Strike Force and the aliens were defeated and Morden was killed. Instrumental in defeating Morden during the first coup were Cpt. Marco Rossi and Lt. Tarma Roving. Rossi (now a Major) and Roving (now a captain) led the fight against the Morden during the second coup, joined by two members of the Intelligence Agency's Special Ops Squad S.P.A.R.R.O.W.S.; Sgt. Eri Kasamoto and Sgt. 1st Class Fiolina Germi.

Several years have passed since that time, and Morden is listed as missing by his surviving followers. Determined to wipe out every remnant of Morden's powerbase, the army send Rossi and Roving to destroy all remaining rebel strongholds, one by one. During the fighting, however, Rossi and Roving come to the conclusion that the enemy is too well organised, and perhaps Morden is not dead as was initially thought. Meanwhile, the S.P.A.R.R.O.W.S. come across a series of strange events which lead the army to conclude that the aliens with whom Morden once allied himself have returned.

The Peregrine Falcon Strike Force and S.P.A.R.R.O.W.S. are once again united, and sent to defeat this new threat. After various battles against Morden's forces, the heroes face off against Morden. After defeating him, it is revealed that it was an alien in disguise, and the real Morden has been taken prisoner by the aliens. The aliens abduct the player character and leave Earth. At this point, another character takes the player character's place. An ad hoc alliance is formed between the Strike Force and Morden's troops so as to save their captured comrades. The rebels launch an armada of rocket ships to attack the alien mother ship, Rugname. After a long battle through the ship's interior, the Rugname starts to collapse due to the amount of damage it has sustained. After destroying the ship's core, the Strike Force must fight their way through armies of clones of their captured teammate, some of whom have turned into zombies. Both the captured member of the Strike Force and Morden are freed. As they escape, they are confronted by the aliens' leader, Rootmars. A battle ensues in Earth's atmosphere, which is won by the Strike Force, who leave Rootmars' body in the ocean. Upon seeing Morden and his men celebrating, the player character throws their weapon into the water in disgust.

== Versions ==
=== Console versions ===
In the PlayStation 2 (PS2) and Xbox versions of the game, once the arcade mode has been beaten, there are two additional mini-games: "Storming the UFO Mothership" and "Fat Island". "Storming the UFO Mothership" mode allows the player to control one of General Morden's soldiers as they attempt to rescue fellow soldiers and attack the Martian forces. The player can choose between the "Shield Soldier", "Bazooka Soldier", and "Normal Soldier". The player is given a single life, which is balanced by the number of reinforcements from fellow soldiers. In "Fat Island", two players compete to gain the most weight in a limited amount of time by eating various foods. They start out at 100 kg and must finish at 200. If players lose enough weight, they will return to normal size and subsequently to a mummy state.

The Xbox version of the game supported online leaderboards via Xbox Live. In line with other original Xbox games, support on Xbox Live ended in 2010. Metal Slug 3 is supported on Insignia, the replacement original Xbox Live servers.

=== Later releases ===
In 2006, Metal Slug Anthology (titled Metal Slug Complete in Japan) was released for the Wii, PlayStation 2 and PSP. This compilation includes the original Metal Slug, and all of its arcade sequels (including Metal Slug 2 and Metal Slug X) up to Metal Slug 6. The games are emulated versions of the originals, with none of the additional game modes or content introduced in the other home versions.

Metal Slug 3 was released on Xbox Live Arcade on January 2, 2008. The game features upscaled graphics and co-op online gameplay, but it does not include the extra modes from console releases. This version was made backwards compatible on Xbox One in 2015.

In March 2012, the AES version of Metal Slug 3 was released for the Virtual Console on the Wii.

In July 2012, a version of the game was released for iOS and Android.

In February 2014, a PC version of the game was released on Steam.

A version of the game for PlayStation 3 and PlayStation Vita (through PlayStation Network) came in November 2014 in Japan and worldwide in March 2015. Hamster Corporation re-released the game as part of their ACA Neo Geo series for the PlayStation 4, Xbox One, Nintendo Switch, Windows, Android and iOS.

== Reception ==
Reception

Aggregate scores
Aggregator	Score			
Aggregator	iOS	PS2	Xbox	Xbox 360
GameRankings	74%	76.78%	75.71%	78.46%
Metacritic	76/100		76/100	78/100

Review scores
Publication	Score			
Publication	iOS	PS2	Xbox	Xbox 360
Eurogamer			7/10	9/10
GameRevolution			C+	
GamesMaster		86/100		
GameSpot			7.5/10	7.5/10
GameSpy			4/5	
IGN			6.8/10	7.4/10
PlayStation Official Magazine – UK		7/10		
Official Xbox Magazine (UK)			6.7/10	8.5/10
Official Xbox Magazine (US)			8/10	8/10
Play		86/100		
PSM3		79/100		

Upon its initial appearance, Metal Slug 3 received generally positive reviews. Most of its subsequent ports and re-releases have also seen good reviews. On GameRankings, the PS2 version has a score of 76.78% based on nine reviews, the Xbox version 75.71% based on sixty-four reviews, the Xbox 360 version 78.46% based on thirteen reviews, and the iOS version 74% based on five reviews. On Metacritic, the Xbox version has a score of 76 out of 100, based on fifty-six reviews, the Xbox 360 version 78 based on twelve reviews, and the iOS version 76 based on five reviews.

In his review of the game for the Xbox, IGN's Hilary Goldstein scored it 6.8 out of 10, feeling that as an arcade shooter, the game stood up well, but as an Xbox title, it was weak when compared to other games on the system: "If this game were $20 or even $30 it would merit a better score and better recommendation. This is not a $40 value unless you absolutely must have this game on your Xbox. When this game drops in price (and it will), that's when you'll want to snatch it up for sure". He scored the Xbox 360 version 7.4 out of 10, again feeling that the game was good for what it was, but somewhat dated when compared to other titles: "Before you purchase Metal Slug 3, you need to ask yourself how much you value ten dollars. This is a short experience that, even with a few playthroughs, won't last you long. Metal Slug 3 is a lot of fun, but this should be a $5 download. Especially when original, awesome-looking shooters such as Omega Five are storming Xbox Marketplace".

GameSpot's Ryan Davis scored both the Xbox and the Xbox 360 versions 7.5 out of 10. Of the Xbox version, he praised most aspects of the game, but criticized the excessive difficulty: "The fundamentals of Metal Slug 3 are all really excellent. You'll be hard-pressed to find another 2D side-scroller with such detailed environments and smooth animation, and the gameplay is the dictionary definition of frenetic. So, with all this going for it, it's a real shame that the brutal continue system introduced in the game's conversion to the Xbox makes the game overly uncompromising. If you are prone to throwing controllers out of frustration, you may want to approach Metal Slug 3 with caution". Of the Xbox 360 version, he argued that the game itself was excellent, but it was a somewhat dated experience: "Ultimately, the things that might prevent you from enjoying Metal Slug 3, such as the number of times it's been released on other systems, its relative price point, and the lack of extras, are peripheral to the experience itself. If these things don't concern you, then you'll have a blast".

Eurogamer's Spanner Spencer scored the Xbox version 7 out of 10. He praised the original game, but as an Xbox game, he found it somewhat wanting: "So short, so sweet. Two-player spins it out for a while, and there are Hard and Very Hard modes, but at £15 if you shop around Metal Slug 3 arguably transcends the usual rental recommendation. No lie, you'll finish the lot in a day. You can try and collect all the extras (Japanese radish and Chinese cabbage are all there for the taking), but there's no getting away from the fact that there's not enough in here to warrant shelling out full whack, no matter how perfect a slice of arcade action it may be". Patrick Garratt were more impressed with the Xbox 360 version, which he scored 9 out of 10, writing: "What's really fascinating here is the fact that a vaguely ageing title appears to have found its niche market on a modern console - this is Metal Slug 3's ideal home, and you'd be a fool not to make it welcome in yours".

GameSpy's Darryl Vassar scored the Xbox version 4 out of 5, arguing that "while each of the individual parts of Metal Slug 3 are unremarkable, they come together in a way that is greater than their sum. Metal Slug 3 is a fantastic game -- it's easy to pick up and play, has great character and depth, and is even better with a friend. There's a reason SNK has so many diehard fans, and this game should bring a few more into the fold".

=== Commercial performance ===
In Japan, Game Machine listed Metal Slug 3 as the third most successful arcade game of April 2000.

The PS2 port sold 47,581 copies in Japan. The 2014 PC port later sold 651,482 digital copies worldwide on Steam, for a total of at least 699,063 copies sold for the PS2 and Steam platforms.
