= Metal Slug Advance =

2004 video game

- North American box art
- Developer: Noise Factory
- Publisher: SNK Playmore
- Director: Hidenari Mamoto
- Producer: Moon
- Programmer: Hidenari Mamoto
- Composer: Den-Den
- Series: Metal Slug
- Platform: Game Boy Advance
- Release: JP: November 18, 2004; NA: November 30, 2004; EU: December 17, 2004
- Genre: Run and gun
- Mode: Single-player

Metal Slug Advance is a 2004 run and gun video game developed by Noise Factory and published by SNK Playmore for the Game Boy Advance. It is part of the Metal Slug series.

== Storyline ==
A survival training camp for new Peregrine Falcon recruits has just begun, where the recruits must survive on an unnamed island with limited supplies and weaponry. However, a large blimp begins to hover above the island, as General Morden's troops parachute down and attempt to build a new base, while successfully capturing many of the new recruits. Players play as either new recruits Walter Ryan or Tyra Elson as the survival training soon becomes a full-fledged assignment for the remaining recruits as they pierce through enemy lines.

== Gameplay ==
The gameplay is very similar to any other Metal Slug game, but with two new systems; the life system, and the card system. The life system is simply a life bar for players, as it replaces the extra lives from all the other Metal Slug games. As players take damage, the life bar depletes (different attacks cause different amounts of damage). Collecting food items can restore health, and players instantly die from being crushed or falling down a pit.

The Card system is a card collecting part of the game. Cards can be found from shooting certain parts of the background, and by obtaining it from certain hostages, and sometimes by doing both. The cards have many different purposes, from giving detailed info on items and characters from the Metal Slug series to boosting player abilities, and even unlocking special (and new) slugs. There are 100 cards to collect, and collecting them all becomes the main objective to anyone who defeats the final boss.

== Reception ==
Reception

Aggregate score
Aggregator	Score
Metacritic	79/100

Review scores
Publication	Score
GameSpot	8.3/10
GameZone	8.2/10
IGN	8.4/10
VideoGamer.com	8/10

Metal Slug Advance received "generally favorable" reviews according to review aggregator Metacritic.

== Release ==
On October 14, 2026, Metal Slug Advance was added to Nintendo Classics along with Monster Rancher Advance and Kururin Paradise

The game will also be in Metal Slug Ultimate Collection in 2027.
