= Metal Slug 6 =

2006 video game

- American arcade flyer
- Developers: Noise Factory; SNK Playmore
- Publishers: Sega; SNK Playmore (consoles)
- Director: Nobuhisa Shinoda
- Producer: Moon
- Designers: Rinken; Masafumi Fujii; Dessy; Akira Nakajima; Ryu Fujii (character designer); Hirokazu Nishitake; Miyavi; Motohiro Kitano; Kiyoshi Akimoto; Shigeto Hozumi; Katsuki Namba; Satoshi Takahashi; Kazuo Shiomi; Tsutomu Shimobayashi; Hidekazu Horimoto (background designer); Yasunari Hayami (interface designer)
- Programmers: Nobuhisa Shinoda; Keiko Kujime; Go Miyazaki; Kensuke Sakata; WORK_RAM; Hiroshi Hishikawa (Tool programmer)
- Composers: Manabu Namiki; Mitsuhiro Kaneda
- Series: Metal Slug
- Platforms: Arcade, Microsoft Windows, PlayStation 2
- Release: Arcade: JP: February 24, 2006; PlayStation 2: JP: September 14, 2006; NA: March 27, 2007; EU: July 6, 2007; Microsoft Windows: EU: 2009
- Genre: Run and gun
- Modes: Single-player, multiplayer
- Arcade system: Atomiswave

Metal Slug 6 (Note: Japanese: メタルスラッグ 6, Hepburn: Metaru Suraggu 6) is a 2006 run and gun video game developed by Noise Factory and SNK Playmore and published by Sega for arcades. It is the sixth installment of the Metal Slug series, the first to not run on the Neo Geo hardware, instead running on Sammy's Atomiswave arcade platform, and the last to be released for arcades as Metal Slug 7 was released exclusively for the Nintendo DS. It was ported to home consoles.

== Plot ==
One month after the events of Metal Slug 3, the threatening presence of General Morden looms over the world once again. Marco Rossi and Tarma Roving of the Peregrine Falcon unit reunites with Eri Kasamoto and Fio Germi of SPARROWS as the quartet is ordered to investigate Morden's latest plan, being joined by two new allies named Ralf Jones and Clark Still of the Ikari Warriors. Together, they proceed into the mountains where Morden's Rebel Army has established an outpost. After destroying their latest war machine in a long hillside battle, the six soldiers confront Morden and discover that he has rebuilt his alliance with the Martians. However, it is soon revealed that the Martians themselves are being invaded and eaten by a new dangerous race of aliens called Invaders and they have turned to Morden for help.

As the Invaders invade Earth's cities, the soldiers fight them off and chase them into the desert, where the Invader King has established a nest. With help from the Rebels, they rescue the captured Martians and succeed in destroying the Invader King.

== Gameplay ==
Metal Slug 6 returns to the Rebel-Martian alliance featured in Metal Slug 2, X, and 3, but on a much broader scale. Rather than repeating the previous games' events of the Martians breaking the alliance and the Rebels assisting the player in turn, the player now teams up with the Rebels and Martians to combat an even greater threat.

There are now two modes of play the player can choose from right at the beginning: Easy and Hard. Easy mode lowers the difficulty of the game and changes the player's default weapon to the Heavy Machine Gun, but the game ends just before the final mission.

As with previous installments, Metal Slug 6 adds a number of new Slugs as well as a new weapon, the Zantetsu Sword, which allows the player's melee weapon to emit lethal energy waves that can neutralize enemy firepower.

Each character now has unique abilities: Marco's basic gun does more damage, Eri can throw bombs in multiple directions, Ralf can perform the Vulcan Punch and take two hits himself before dying, and so on. Some characters also have special attack techniques that are activated through certain button combinations. Characters can now throw away one gun power-up's worth of ammunition, to give to the other player or simply discard altogether. A secondary melee attack is also available. Conversely, the sliding technique from Metal Slug 5 has been removed, and players except Fio and Ralf only receive half as much ammo for special guns.

Metal Slug 6 introduces a new play mechanic dubbed the 'Weapon Stock System'. Two gun power-ups can now be carried at the same time. Players can switch between the two weapons, or simply put them both away in favor of the default weapon. When obtaining a new weapon power-up, it will automatically occupy the inactive slot, or, if both are holstered, replace the less recent weapon of the two.

The score is multiplied by powers of 2. The faster the speed at which enemies are killed, the higher the power, as a meter at the bottom of the screen shows. When it says "Max" enemies and destructible objects will drop coins for an extra high score.

== Release ==
A PlayStation 2 port was released on September 14, 2006. A downloadable version was made available on the PlayStation Store for PlayStation 3 on May 20, 2015. It is also featured in Metal Slug Anthology for the Wii, PlayStation 2 and PlayStation Portable. In 2020, a homebrew conversion was released for the Dreamcast.
