= Metal Slug 5 =

2003 video game

- Developers: Noise Factory; SNK Playmore
- Publishers: SNK Playmore; Mega; Ignition Entertainment (PS2)
- Director: Toru Hagihara
- Artists: Misao Yoshida; Reiko Nagashima; Sayuri Matsumoto
- Composer: Toshikazu Tanaka
- Series: Metal Slug
- Platforms: Arcade, Microsoft Windows, Neo Geo AES, PlayStation 2, Xbox
- Release: November 13, 2003: Arcade; JP: November 13, 2003; NA: November 2003 Neo Geo AES; JP: February 19, 2004; NA: 2004 Windows; WW: September 17, 2004 PlayStation 2; JP: April 28, 2005; NA: May 24, 2005; AU: March 30, 2006; EU: March 31, 2006 Xbox; JP: July 28, 2005; NA: August 16, 2005; EU: March 10, 2006
- Genre: Run and gun
- Modes: Single-player, multiplayer
- Arcade system: Neo Geo MVS

Metal Slug 5 (Note: Japanese: メタルスラッグ 5, Hepburn: Metaru Suraggu 5) is a 2003 run and gun video game developed by Noise Factory and SNK Playmore and published by SNK Playmore for the Neo Geo arcade and home platforms. It is the fifth game in the Metal Slug series. It was the last Metal Slug released on the Neo Geo, as its sequels would run on the Atomiswave hardware and eventually transition to home consoles.

It was later ported to the PlayStation 2 and Xbox as a standalone game, and along with Metal Slug 4 as a compilation in North America and South Korea. It was ported to Microsoft Windows for a Korean release.

== Gameplay ==
Gameplay screenshot showcasing the first boss.

Metal Slug 5 is a 2D side-scrolling action shooter in which players can choose from four playable characters: Marco, Tarma, Eri, or Fio, each tasked with completing five missions while battling numerous enemies.

The game features various vehicles for players to control, including the Slug Mariner submarine, the Slug Flyer aircraft, and the newly introduced Slug Gunner robot. Metal Slug 5 introduces gameplay mechanics such as dual-wielding weapons and the ability to slide while shooting. The game supports two-player cooperative play and allows players to replay completed missions.

== Plot ==
A year after the events of Metal Slug 4, a special disc that contains deep and intricate secrets about the Metal Slug project is stolen by a mysterious group called the Ptolemaic Army, whose specialty lies from within archaeological excavation and espionage. Marco and Tarma of the Peregrine Falcon Strike Force follow in hot pursuit against the group and in the process are joined by Eri and Fio of SPARROWS. Together once more, the quartet investigate the shrouded objective of the Ptolemaic Army, who over time grows more powerful as they are joined by a mysterious masked man and his followers. At the end of the game, the Ptolemaic Army summons a giant demon as the final boss, which after a long battle is forced to leave Earth thanks to the heroes.

== Reception ==
Reception

Aggregate scores
Aggregator	Score
GameRankings	70.89%/70.47%
Metacritic	71

Review score
Publication	Score
Jeuxvideo.com	10/20 (PS2)

Metal Slug 5 received mixed to positive reviews from critics. It received very positive scores from players, with an average of 8.1 on GameSpot for the PS2 version and 8.4 for the arcade version.
