= Metal Slug =

Video game series

- The original Metal Slug logo
- Genre: Run and gun
- Developers: SNK; Nazca Corporation; Noise Factory; Mega Enterprise
- Publishers: SNK; Ignition Entertainment; Atlus USA
- First release: Metal Slug; April 19, 1996
- Latest release: Metal Slug Tactics; November 5, 2024

Metal Slug (Japanese: メタルスラッグ, Hepburn: Metaru Suraggu) is a Japanese run and gun video game series and multimedia franchise originally created by Nazca Corporation before merging with SNK in 1996 after the completion of the first game in the series. Spin-off games include a third-person shooter to commemorate the 10th anniversary of the series, multiple tower defense games, and a turn-based tactics game. While originally created for Neo-Geo arcade machines hardware (MVS) and the Neo-Geo home game consoles (AES) hardware, the original games have also been ported to other consoles and mobile platforms throughout the years, with several later games created for various other platforms. The games focus on the Peregrine Falcon Squad, a small group of soldiers who fight against a rebel army, aliens, zombies, mummies and various other forces intent on world domination. Over the years since its debut, the franchise developed a small, but passionate cult following due to its unique visuals and slapstick humor.

== Gameplay ==
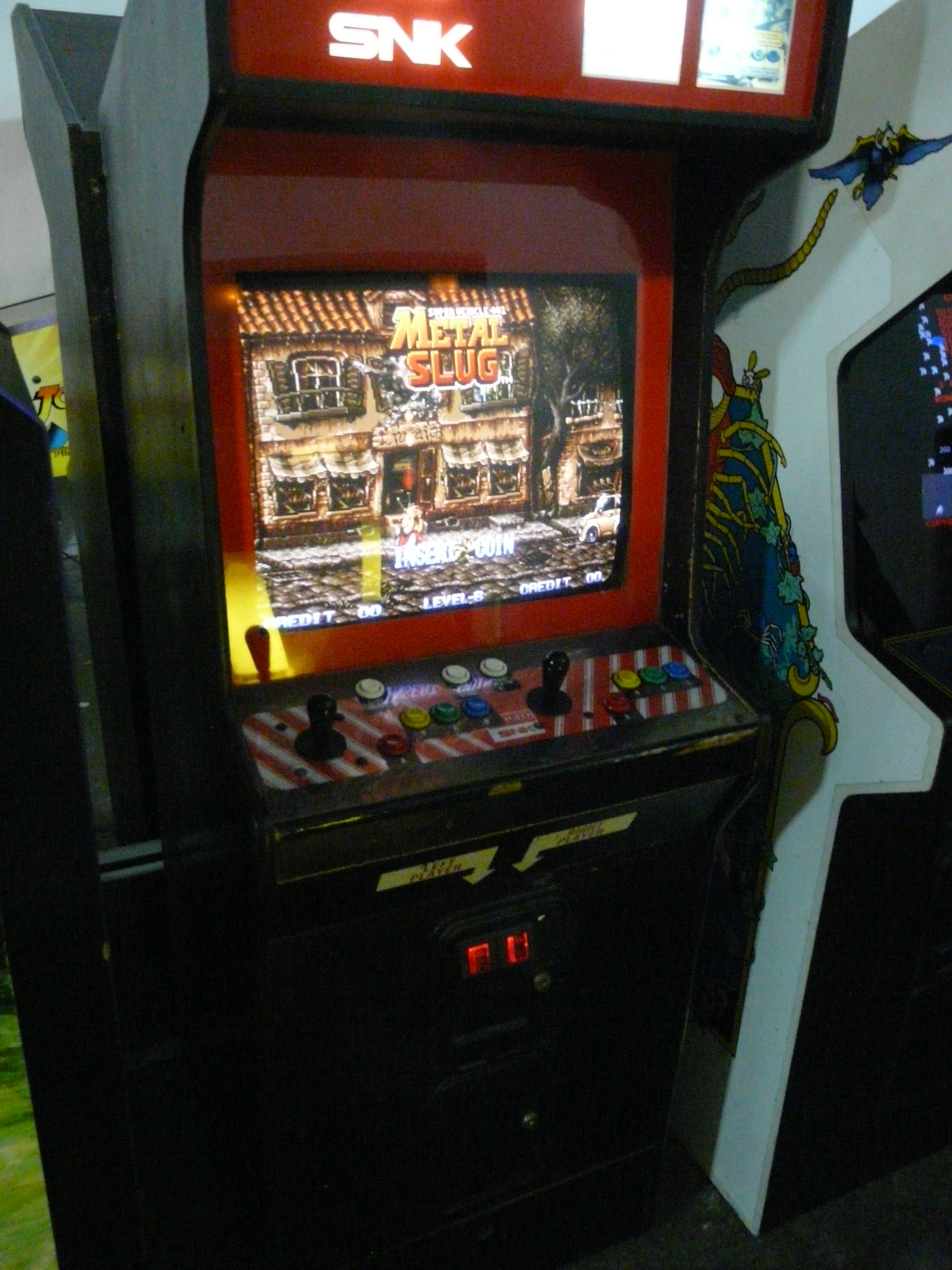
Metal Slug machine in the Musée Mécanique, San Francisco

The gameplay consists of run and gun elements as well as, in later releases, shoot 'em-up mechanics. The run and gun elements put a player against many enemies with the aid of extremely powerful weapon pick-ups. In most run and gun games, contact with an enemy leads to damage. In this series, however, contact results in the opportunity to perform a melee attack and the opportunity for the enemy to perform a melee attack of his own, if he has one. The player's melee attack is also much stronger than most shots. This leads to the player's ability to run in and use melee attacks to take down a number of enemies at once, as well as the ability to quickly defeat enemies that can take plenty of damage, such as the mummies in Metal Slug 2.

The player starts with only a simple semi-automatic handgun (Metal Slug 6 and 7 used a fully automatic handgun in place of the stock semi-auto first used in every game including a spin-off); as the game progresses, the player may pick up new weapons. The player can only use one weapon at a time. When a new weapon is found, it replaces the previous one. Similarly, when ammunition runs out, the player reverts to using the handgun, which has unlimited ammunition. A new system was implemented with Metal Slug 6 allowing players to carry and switch between the handgun and two other weapons. The player is also equipped with grenades which can be thrown at enemies to cause more damage, however, the number of grenades is limited and must be replenished periodically with ammunition found along the way.

The SV-001 (SV being an abbreviation for "Super Vehicle") or 'Metal Slug' is the main vehicle of the Metal Slug franchise. It is a small, cartoonish silver-gray tank propelled by caterpillar treads. The tank is armed with one cannon which shoots powerful bombs in limited numbers, and twin vulcan cannons which shoot unlimited tracer bullets. The vehicle can jump and crouch. Crouching opens a hatch on the top of the tank through which grenades already in the player's possession can be thrown. The grenades remain independent of the cannon's ammunition system. The vehicle's bombs can also be replenished with ammunition boxes found along the way. The vehicle can run over infantry and perform a suicide attack, with the driver jumping clear and the tank ramming into and exploding upon the target. The vehicle can take three direct hits before it is destroyed, at which point a warning will be given to eject before the vehicle explodes. The enemy chaser variant has a shield that must be destroyed before the vehicle can be destroyed.

Over time, these specifications changed into any vehicle armed with a Vulcan cannon and a cannon variant suited to the role of the vehicle, and propelled suitably for that vehicle's environment. Some vehicles will only provide Vulcan cannons (which are more powerful than the handgun's bullets and are also unlimited), but neither special bombs (grenades must be used) nor armored protection to the player. In Metal Slug 6 (and the home version of Metal Slug X onwards), the playable character Tarma can lock the Vulcan cannons into one position and fire continuously.

Metal Slug games typically have 6 levels. The exceptions are Metal Slug 3, Metal Slug 5 and Metal Slug 6, which have 5, and Metal Slug 7, which has 7. In the Western arcade and console versions, the game had the blood censored, showing sweat in its place. However, there is a code to disable this censor within the BIOS of the Neo-Geo hardware both on the arcade and home ports respectively.

== Plot ==
=== Setting ===
The first game's story involved the Peregrine Falcon (PF) Squad, a small but skilled team of soldiers serving under the Regular Army's special operations division, who fight against the army of General Donald Morden in order to prevent a massive coup d'état and the creation of a New World Order. Later games featured characters from the Sparrows Unit, which is under the control of the Regular Army's intelligence division. Beginning with Metal Slug 2, the PF Squad also battles an alien threat to Earth (the Mars People), as well as several other supernatural threats including yetis, zombies, ambulatory Venus flytraps, giant crabs, and mummies. These outlandish elements were removed from the fifth game to return to the feel of the original title. The fifth moved to the motif of modern guerrilla warfare, leaving only traces of the series' signature quirky humor and paranormal enemies, with the exception of the final boss. Metal Slug 6 returned to the plot of the first three installments, bringing back Morden's Rebel Army and the Mars People. Metal Slug 7 has less outlandish elements with the Mars People replaced by an alternative universe of Morden's Army with futuristic equipment and weapons.

=== Characters ===
Characters of Metal Slug

==== Heroes ====
Major Marco Rossi (voiced by Takenosuke Nishikawa in NeoGeo Battle Coliseum and by Kenta Miyake in Neo Geo Heroes: Ultimate Shooting) and Captain Tarma Roving were the only playable characters in the first game, and each was reserved solely to the first and second player, respectively. From the second installment, characters can be chosen independently, and Sergeant 2nd Class members Eri Kasamoto and Master Sergeant Fiolina "Fio" Germi were added to the cast. These four are typically considered to be the quintessential Metal Slug team. In the fourth game, Nadia Cassel and Trevor Spacey made their debut, replacing Eri and Tarma. They have not returned in later games, as they were created by the Korean-based Mega Enterprise and due to Playmore retaining intellectual rights to all SNK titles. Eri and Tarma returned in the fifth game. The Game Boy Advance edition of the game features two new characters specific to that title: PF squad trainees Cadets Walter Ryan and Tyra Elson. The King of Fighters/Ikari Warriors characters Colonel Ralf Jones and Second Lieutenant Clark Still have appeared since Metal Slug 6, and their King of Fighters teammate Leona Heidern is available as an extra downloadable character for Metal Slug XX, a revised edition of Metal Slug 7.

==== Enemies ====
General Donald Morden is the main antagonist of the Metal Slug franchise. He is depicted as a rambling madman wearing a beret, eyepatch, and wearing his army's uniform. In some games, he bears a passing resemblance to Saddam Hussein. He appears in every game except Metal Slug 5. He apparently mends his ways by the end of Metal Slug 6, as he (or Rootmars depending on the player(s)' chosen route) rescues the player(s) after they are knocked off a wall by an explosion caused by the alien end boss. His army is the main force of opposition in the Metal Slug games, with the exception of Metal Slug 5 and 6. He commands the Rebel Army, and in Metal Slug 4 he was thought to be behind the Amadeus Terror Syndicate. He once again returns to his roots of attempted world domination in Metal Slug 7, this time with the help of the Rebel Army from the future, also being the final boss for the first time since the original Metal Slug. Like the main characters, General Morden appears in various SNK games as a cameo, especially in the SNK vs. Capcom: Card Fighters series.

Allen O'Neil, a sub-boss, appears in all of the games except Metal Slug 5 and 6. He returns in Metal Slug 7. He uses an M60 machine gun, a knife, and grenades. Despite the fact that Allen is clearly killed at the conclusion of every encounter, the game makers have humorously brought him back in each new iteration of the series. Allen's son, Allen Jr., appears in Metal Slug Advance as the recruits' drill sergeant but later reveals himself as a double agent for the Rebel Army. He can be fought in the final mission as an optional boss.

The Mars People are aliens that are in a plot to take over Earth in the Metal Slug universe. They resemble squids, using their tentacles as a form of movement, and a strange fighting style that involves gas and a laser pistol. In Metal Slug 2, they appeared as enemies near the climax of the game, with their mother ship appearing as the final boss. They appear again in Metal Slug 3, abducting Morden and one of the members of the Regular Army in the final level (whichever one the player uses will be abducted), only for the Regular Army and Morden's army to take the fight to their mother ship and defeat them, and their leader Rootmars. In Metal Slug 6, the Mars People, Morden, as well as his rebel army, and the Ikari Warriors, join forces with the Regular Army to fight a new alien invader who feeds on the Mars People. In Metal Slug X they appear as enemies early in the game. Mars People also are the first characters from the Metal Slug series who appear in a fighting game: first in SNK vs. Capcom: SVC Chaos as a hidden (but playable) character, and later in Neo Geo Battle Coliseum as an unlockable playable character.

== Development ==
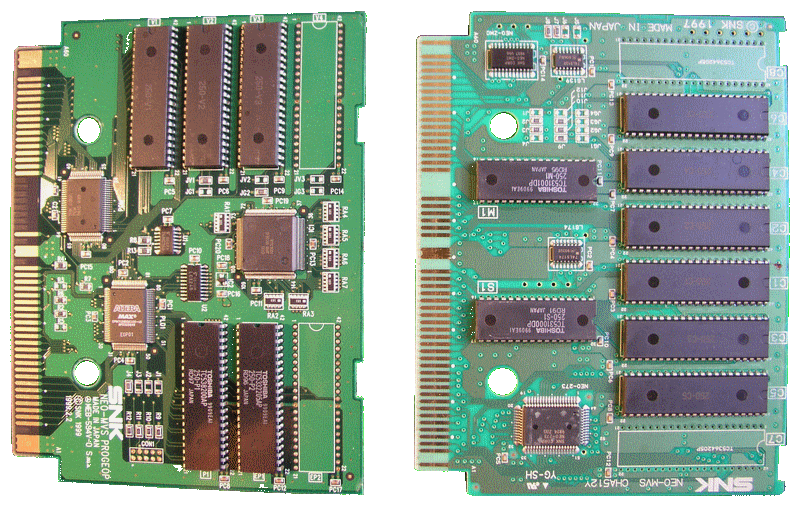
PCBs of a Metal Slug X: Super Vehicle-001 machine

The aspect of the Metal Slug series was to create a simple, but exciting side-scrolling shoot-em-up game with an easy control scheme (one joystick and three buttons). The same team that created Metal Slug for the Neo-Geo previously created several games for Irem which have very similar graphics and gameplays, such as GunForce (1991), In the Hunt (1993) and Gunforce 2 (1994).

Some of the stock sound effects and sprites from Irem and The King of Fighters titles were used in the Metal Slug games. The music was composed by Takushi Hiyamuta (who is credited as Hiya!), a key member of the Nazca Corporation, which was acquired by SNK in 1996. The first three titles were developed by the Nazca team before SNK declared bankruptcy in October 2001, leading to the disbandment of the original team. Anticipating the collapse of SNK, the company Playmore was launched in August 2001, which became known as SNK Playmore in 2003, the year after Metal Slug 4 was released. Development on the series has since continued without the original staff, with Noise Factory handling 4, 5, 6, and 7.
