= List of Irem games =

The following is a list of games developed and/or published by Irem (formerly known as IPM) for a variety of arcade and console platforms. The page may also includes ports from other companies licensed by Irem.

== Arcade ==
Title	System	JP	NA	US Distributor
Table Block (Note: A clone of Breakout)		March 1978	Unreleased	
Power Block		September 1978	Unreleased	
Stardust		September 1978	Unreleased	
Piccolo (Note: A clone of Circus)		September 1978	Unreleased	
Nyankoro		November 1978	Unreleased	
IPM Invaders (Note: A clone of Space Invaders)	M-10	January 1979	Unreleased	
New Block X		January 1979	Unreleased	
Mahjong Game		January 1979	Unreleased	
Mahjong DX		June 1979	Unreleased	
Capsule Invaders (Note: Originally released by Taito)		July 1979	Unreleased	
Head On (Note: Originally released by Sega)	M-10	September 1979	Unreleased	
Galaxy Wars (Note: Originally released by Universal)		September 1979	Unreleased	
Space Command		October 1979	Unreleased	
New Block Z		November 1979	Unreleased	
Richi Mahjong		November 1979	Unreleased	
Galaxian (Note: Originally by Namco)		December 1979	Unreleased	
Commander		December 1979	Unreleased	
Space Beam	M-10	1979	November 1980	Nanao
Astro Fighter (Note: Originally released by Data East)		January 1980	Unreleased	
Sky Chuter	M-10	March 1980	Unreleased	
Itazura Angel		April 1980	Unreleased	
Green Beret	M-10	May 1980	Unreleased	
Andromeda SS	M-10	July 1980	Unreleased	
Uni Wars; Ginga Teikoku no Gyakushū^{JP}		October 1980	October 1980	Irem
Panther	M-27	October 1980	October 1980	Irem
Payout Mahjong		February 1981	Unreleased	
Red Alert; WWIII^{JP}	M-27	July 1981	October 1981	GDI
Fever Mahjong		September 1981	Unreleased	
Computer Mahjong Jyancer		October 1981	Unreleased	
Demoneye-X	M-27	October 1981	October 1981	Irem
Oli-Boo-Chu; Punching Kid^{JP}	M-27	January 1982	August 1982	Thomas Automatics
Moon Patrol	M-52	June 1982	August 1982	Williams
MotoRace USA; Zippy Race^{JP} Traverse USA^{EU}	M-52	June 1983	August 1983	Williams
Tropical Angel	M-57	September 1983	Unreleased	
10-Yard Fight	M-58	December 1983	March 1984	Taito
VS 10-Yard Fight	VS	March 1984	Unreleased	
Atomic Boy; Wily Tower^{JP}	M-63	April 1984	July 1985	Memetron
Lode Runner (Note: Licensed from Broderbund)	M-62	July 1984	November 1984	Digital Control
The Battle Road	M-62	October 1984	October 1984	Irem
Kung-Fu Master; Spartan X^{JP}	M-62	December 1984	March 1985	Data East
Lode Runner II: The Bungeling Strikes Back	M-62	January 1985	Unreleased	
Lot Lot	M-62	September 1985	Unreleased	
Lode Runner III: The Golden Labyrinth; Lode Runner III: Majin no Fukkatsu^{JP}	M-62	November 1985	Unreleased	
Spelunker	M-62	January 1986	Unreleased	
Battle Bird		January 1986	Unreleased	
Yōjūden	M-62	June 1986	Unreleased	
Spelunker II: 23 no Kagi	M-62	September 1986	Unreleased	
Lode Runner IV: Teikoku kara no Dasshutsu	M-62	October 1986	Unreleased	
Kid Niki: Radical Ninja; Kaiketsu Yanchamaru^{JP}	M-62	December 1986	March 1987	Data East
R Type	M-72	March 1987	October 1987	Nintendo
Battle Chopper; Mr. Heli no Daibōken^{JP}	M-72	December 1987	December 1987	Irem
Vigilante	M-75	March 1988	February 1988	Data East
Kickle Cubicle; Meikyūjima^{JP}	M-77	June 1988	Unreleased	
Ninja Spirit; Saigo no Shinobidō^{JP}	M-72	August 1988	October 1988	Irem
Image Fight	M-72	October 1988	November 1988	Irem
Match It (Note: Developed by Tamtex); Shisenshō^{JP}	M-80	February 1989	Unreleased	
Legend of Hero Tonma; Tonma^{JP}	M-72	April 1989	March 1990	Irem
Dragon Breed	M-72^{JP/EU} M-81^{EU alt}	July 1989	September 1989	Irem
X-Multiply	M-72^{JP} M-81^{EU}	September 1989	March 1990	Irem
R-Type II	M-84	November 1989	April 1990	Irem
Major Title	M-82	March 1990	Unreleased	
Air Duel	M-72^{JP/EU} M-82^{EU alt/US}	June 1990	June 1990	Irem
Hammerin' Harry; Daiku no Gen-san^{JP}	M-72^{JP} M-81^{EU} M-82^{JP alt} M-84^{JP alt/US}	July 1990	June 1990	Irem
Pound for Pound	M-85	December 1990	December 1990	Irem
Ken-Go; Lightning Swords	M-84	February 1991	Unreleased	Irem
Hasamu	M-90	March 1991	Unreleased	Irem
GunForce	M-92	June 1990	September 1991	Irem
Blade Master; Cross Blades^{JP}	M-92	July 1991	September 1991	Irem
Bomberman (Note: Created under license from Hudson Soft); Atomic Punk^{NA} Dynablaster^{EU}	M-90	September 1991	September 1991	Irem
Cosmic Cop; Gallup - Armored Police Unit^{JP}	M-72^{JP} M-84^{JP alt/EU}	October 1991	November 1991	Irem
Lethal Thunder; Thunder Blaster^{JP}	M-92	December 1991	December 1991	Irem
Mystic Riders; Mahō Keibitai Gun Hōki^{JP}	M-92	May 1992	May 1992	Irem
Bomberman World; New Atomic Punk: Global Quest^{NA} New Dynablaster: Global Quest^{EU}	M-97^{JP/US/EU} M-99^{JP alt}	June 1992	September 1992	Irem
Undercover Cops	M-92	July 1992	March 1992	Irem
Major Title 2: Tournament Leader; The Irem Skins Game^{WW}	M-92	October 1992	October 1992	Irem
R-Type Leo	M-92	November 1992	Unreleased	
Angel Whisper (Note: A fortune telling machine.)		December 1992	Unreleased	
Quiz F1 One-Two Finish	M-97	December 1992	Unreleased	
Hill Climber (Note: A redemption game. Licensed by Leprechaun.)		1993	1993	
Hook	M-92	February 1993	December 1992	Irem
In the Hunt; Kaitei Daisensō^{JP}	M-92	April 1993	April 1993	Irem
Shisenshō II; Match It II^{WW}	M-97	June 1993	Unreleased	
Gussun Oyoyo; Risky Challenge^{WW}	M-97	September 1993	September 1993	Irem
Ninja Baseball Bat Man; Yakyū Kakutō League Man^{JP}	M-92	October 1993	October 1993	Irem
Superior Soldiers; Perfect Soldiers^{JP}	M-92	December 1993	February 1994	Irem
Fire Barrel; Air Assault^{WW}	M-107	February 1994	1994	Irem
GunForce II; Geo Storm^{JP}	M-92	July 1994	September 1994	Irem
Dream Soccer '94 (Note: Irem published the M-92 version. Data East published the M-107 version.)	M-92^{JP} M-107^{WW}	September 1994	1994	Data East
World PK Soccer (Note: A strength tester machine. Published by Jaleco.)	M-107	September 1994	Unreleased	

=== Prototypes ===
- Super Kung-Fu Master/Beyond Kung-Fu (1985) (M-62)
- Kozoutai Gatcyo (1987)
- Huddle Up (1988)

== MSX / MSX2 ==
- 1982
  - Moon Patrol (1982/1984) (Produced by Dempa) DP-3912011 (GenMSX entry)
- 1985
  - Kung-Fu Acho (聖拳アチョー) also known as Seiken Acho, produced by Irem and ASCII. (GenMSX entry)
- 1986
  - Spelunker (licensed from Brøderbund) IM-01 (GenMSX entry)
  - 10-Yard Fight IM-02 (GenMSX entry)
  - Panther (GenMSX entry)
- 1987
  - Super Lode Runner (licensed from Brøderbund) IM-03 (MSX & MSX2) (GenMSX entry)
  - R-Type (1987,1988) IM-04 (MSX & MSX2) (GenMSX entry)

== Sharp X68000 ==
- 1989
  - R-Type
- 1990
  - Image Fight

== Famicom / NES ==
- 1985
  - Kung Fu (licensed to Nintendo) (Spartan X in Japan)
  - Zippy Race
  - 10-Yard Fight
  - Spelunker
  - Lot Lot
- 1986
  - Sqoon
  - Deadly Towers
- 1987
  - Spelunker II: Yūja e no Chōsen
  - Kid Niki: Radical Ninja / Kaiketsu Yanchamaru
- 1988
  - The Guardian Legend
  - Napoleon Senki
  - Hototogisu
- 1989
  - Nishimura Kyoutarou Mystery: Blue Train Satsujin Jiken
  - Holy Diver
  - Major League
  - Gekitotsu Yonku Battle
  - Shinsenden
- 1990
  - Image Fight
  - Nishimura Kyoutarou Mystery: Super Express Satsujin Jiken
  - Kickle Cubicle
  - Paaman: Enban wo Torikaese!!
- 1991
  - Metal Storm
  - Kaiketsu Yanchamaru 2: Karakuri Land
  - Spartan X 2 (the American localization, known as Kung Fu II, was cancelled)
  - Hammerin' Harry / Daiku No Gen-San
  - Paaman Part 2
- 1992
  - Taiyou no Yuusha Firebird
- 1993
  - Ai Sensei no Oshiete: Watashi no Hoshi
  - Kaiketsu Yanchamaru 3: Taiketsu! Zouringen
  - Daiku no Gen-san 2: Akage no Dan no Gyakushuu

== Famicom Disk System ==
- 1986
  - Kineko
- 1987
  - Kineko II
  - Super Lode Runner
  - Mahjong Kazoku
  - Super Lode Runner II
  - Yōkai Yashiki

== Game Boy ==
- 1990
  - Shisenshō: Match-Mania
- 1991
  - Racing Damashii
  - Ganso!! Yancha Maru
  - Kung Fu Master
  - R-Type
  - Taiyou no Yuusha Firebird
- 1992
  - Hammerin' Harry: Ghost Building Company / Daiku no Gen-san: Ghost Building Company
  - Kizuchida Quiz Da Gen-San Da!
  - Noobow
  - R-Type II
- 1993
  - Saigo no Nindou: Ninja Spirit
  - Undercover Cops
- 1994
  - Daiku No Gen-San: Robot Teikoku No Yabou (1994)

== Game Boy Color ==
- 2000
  - Daiku no Gensan - Kachikachi no Tonkachi ga Kachi

== Super Famicom / Super NES ==
- 1991
  - Super R-Type
- 1992
  - The Irem Skins Game (known as Major Title in Japan and Europe)
  - DinoCity
  - GunForce
- 1993
  - R-Type III: The Third Lightning (Super NES version published by Jaleco in 1994.)
  - Street Combat (it is NCS' first Super Famicom Ranma 1/2 fighting game, with the license removed)
  - Rocky Rodent (Nitro Punks Mightheads in Japan)
  - Ganbare! Daiku no Gen-san
  - Undercover Cops (Super NES version unreleased. Super Famicom version published by Varie in 1995.)

== PC Engine / TurboGrafx-16 ==
- 1988
  - R-Type
- 1989
  - Vigilante
  - Mr. Heli no Daibōken
- 1990
  - Image Fight
  - Ninja Spirit
- 1992
  - Legend of Hero Tonma
  - Racing Damashi
- 1993
  - Gekisha Boy

== PC Engine CD ROM / TurboGrafx-16 CD ROM ==
- 1991
  - R-Type Complete CD
- 1992
  - Image Fight II
- 1993
  - Eiyū Sangokushi
- 1994
  - Sol Moonarge

== PlayStation and Sega Saturn ==
- 1995
  - In the Hunt
- 1996
  - Irem Arcade Classics
  - Zoku Gussun Oyoyo
  - Yoyo's Puzzle Park
- 1998
  - R-Types (PlayStation only)
- 1999
  - R-Type Delta (PlayStation only)
- 2000
  - Katon-Kun

== PlayStation 2 ==
- 2001
  - Gekibo 2 / (the European localization, known as Polaroid Pete, was cancelled)
- 2002
  - Sub Rebellion
  - Disaster Report
- 2003
  - R-Type Final
- 2004
  - Sakurasaka Shouboutai
- 2005
  - Steambot Chronicles
  - Blokus Portable: Steambot Championship/Blokus Club with Bumpy Trot
- 2006
  - Raw Danger!

== PlayStation 3 ==
- 2009
  - Minna de Spelunker; downloadable from the PSN Store.
  - Zettai Zetsumei Toshi 4: Summer Memories; Scheduled to be released Spring 2011, the fourth game in the survival horror Zettai Zetsumei Toshi series was cancelled as a result of the Tōhoku earthquake. Development was later resumed by the newly formed developer Granzella after they had acquired the intellectual property from Irem. The game would eventually be released on the PlayStation 4 under the title Zettai Zetsumei Toshi 4 Plus: Summer Memories, though Irem would not assist in the development or release of this final product.

== PlayStation Portable ==
- 2007
  - R-Type Tactics
- 2008
  - Hammerin' Hero
  - Steambot Chronicles: Battle Tournament
- 2009
  - Zettai Zetsumei Toshi 3: Kowareyuku Machi to Kanojo no Uta
  - Mawaskes
  - R-Type Tactics II: Operation Bitter Chocolate
  - Sengoku Efuda Yuugi: Hototogisu Ran
- 2010
  - Sengoku Efuda Yuugi: Hototogisu Tairan
  - Narisokonai Eiyuutan: Taiyou to Tsuki no Monogatari
- 2011
  - Doki Doki Suikoden

== Xbox 360 ==
- 2008
  - R-Type Dimensions

== Other compilations ==
- Irem Arcade Hits (2010, Win/Mac)
- Irem Arcade 1 (2022, Evercade)
- Irem Collection (2023, PS4/PS5/NS/XB/XSX)
