= Undercover Cops =

1992 video game

- Japanese arcade flyer
- Developer: Irem (Note: Super Famicom version developed by Varie.)
- Publisher: Irem
- Director: Meeher
- Designers: Akio; Susumu; Kozo; Nob; Super Famicom; Uma; Nabe; Katana; Michiroh; Nitro 49
- Programmers: Teroling; Danger Nao; Super Famicom; Kan Chan; Get A$; Ika‑B; Genta 800KG
- Composer: Takushi Hiyamuta
- Platforms: Arcade, Super Famicom
- Release: Arcade: NA: March 1992; JP: July 1992; Super Famicom: JP: March 3, 1995; Super Nintendo: NA: October 2021; EU: October 2021
- Genre: Beat 'em up
- Modes: Single-player, multiplayer
- Arcade system: Irem M-92 system hardware

Undercover Cops (アンダーカバーコップス, Andākabākoppusu) is a 1992 beat 'em up video game developed and published by Irem for arcades. It was the company's first attempt at the modern beat 'em up genre, which had been established with their previous game Kung-Fu Master (1984). Players control "city sweepers", a police agent-like group who fights crime by taking down thugs in New York City in the year 2043. The game was ported to the Super Famicom exclusively in Japan in 1995.

== Gameplay ==
Arcade version screenshot

Undercover Cops is notable for its detailed backgrounds and grimy futuristic setting. For its time, it was relatively gory, featuring crow-pecked skeletons in the midst of its urban wastelands and forcing players to lose a life by being crushed by a garbage compactor during the first boss battle. While the gameplay is inspired by Final Fight, some of the enemies are unique. Besides the usual human thugs, players fight strange mole creatures and mutants with jet packs and blades for hands. Players can never use enemy weapons, but the stages contain objects that can be picked up and used instead such as burning oil drums, steel girders, long concrete columns that shatter on impact, boxes of hand grenades and fish. The characters eat mice, frogs, birds and snails to restore their health.

The Japanese arcade version differs from the World version in several respects. The characters have a number of moves not seen in the World version, including dash + jump attacks, up to two different kinds of throws, and a powerful airborne special attack. The backgrounds and graphics are also different, especially at the start of Level Two and the end of Level Three. The music in the Japanese version has a more electronic feel and includes more voice samples. Some enemies carry broken bottles, knives and axes (in the World version these are replaced by planks and clubs). The mole creatures are weaker, taking only one hit to kill. Players' jump attacks do less damage, but their wider range of attacks makes them much more versatile.

The appearance and functions of the police car seen at the end of Undercover Cops exactly resembles the appearance and functions of the tank from Moon Patrol, another arcade game by Irem. The boss from Stage 1 of the first R-Type, also by Irem, can be seen on the screens of some red television sets. Undercover Cops was later advertised on a blimp seen in the arcade flyers of Irem's other beat 'em up, Ninja Baseball Bat Man.

== Characters ==
Playable characters:

- Zan Takahara (ザン・タカハラ) (known in the US version as Claude) is a scruffy Japanese former karate master who was banned from formal tournaments after killing a man in self-defense. He is a well-rounded character and similar in effect to Rosa. He also has the ability to shoot multiple fireballs.
- Matt Gables (マット・ゲーブルズ) (known in the US version as Bubba) is an American ex-gridiron player turned city sweeper after being sent to rock bottom by a false accusation of murder. He is the most powerful but slowest character, but has the ability to run for a short period of time. Plus, he can dive through the ground when he uses his airborne attack.
- Rosa Felmonde (ローザ・フェルモンド) (known in the US version as Flame) is a tough British blonde female vigilante whose lover, Thomas, was murdered by thugs. She is the fastest and easiest used character, making her good for beginners. She can send surrounding waves of energy if surrounded by enemies.

Bosses:

- Parcs (パークス) (known in the US as Cue Ball) is a Terminator-like cyborg. He is the only boss who can be defeated in two ways: either normally or being crushed in a garbage compactor (players, however, must be careful during this boss battle because this can also happen to their character).
- Fransowors (フランソワーズ) (known in the US as Fatso) is an obese, jackhammer-wielding dominatrix. She summons lesser enemies and cries when she starts to weak or gets hit, and bawls more loudly when her life bar is half-empty.
- Moguralian β (Beta) (モグラリアンβ（ベータ）) (known in the US as Gunpuncher) is the heavily armed leader of the mole creatures who utters simple Japanese phrases. He is armed with a machine gun and explosives.
- Balbarotch (バルバロッチ) (known in the US as Cone Head) is a crazed carnival freak with a metal claw, who attacks with a wide range of concealed weapons.
- Dr. Crayborn (クレイボーン博士) is the main antagonist in the game. He is a small, bespectacled scientist who transforms into a giant monster. He is confronted by the three protagonists near the end of the final stage before the final battle.

== Home version ==
Undercover Cops was later ported to the Super Famicom by the company Varie. An American localization was planned, but canceled. The unreleased American version was reviewed in Vol. 58 of Nintendo Power.

A physical release with an official translation was released for the SNES by Retro-Bit. 3000 units were shipped to North America and Europe in October 2021.

In the Super Famicom version, the player can adjust the number of lives and credits, as well as the skill setting, although there is no two-player mode. Playing "Easy" mode only gets the player to the end of the third level, after which the game ends, giving the player a stern message in Japanese, then asking them in English to try the next level (normal). A noticeable difference is the appearance of the common female enemy Fox, whose breasts are visible after being knocked down in the arcade version. The console version slightly alters her shirt to be fully covered when knocked down.

== Reception ==
Reception

Review score
Publication	Score
Super GamePower	3.8/5

In Japan, Game Machine listed Undercover Cops as the sixth most-successful table arcade unit of August 1992. In North America, RePlay listed it as the tenth most popular arcade game of August 1992.

In 2023, Time Extension included the game on their list of the top 25 "Best Beat 'Em Ups of All Time".

== Legacy ==
- Undercover Cops
- Manga
- Published by: Shinseisha
- Magazine: Gamest Comics
- Published: August 30, 1993 - February 10, 1995
- Volumes: 2

Due to its small success in Japan, Undercover Cops also got its own manga by Waita Uziga, which was published in the Gamest Comics series by Shinseisha in 1993. The game was later followed by a Game Boy spin-off titled Undercover Cops: Hakaishin Garumaa, and a more accurate translation called Undercover Cops Alpha (アンダーカバーコップスα), which retains the details of the original arcade version.

A few years later after its release, a lot of the team (artists, programmers, composers, designers, etc.) who made Undercover Cops went on to form the Nazca Corporation, who created the Metal Slug game series. The team have also worked on the Hammerin' Harry series, Superior Soldiers, In the Hunt and GunForce II.
