= GunForce II =

1994 video game

- Japanese Arcade flyer
- Developer: Irem
- Publishers: Irem; DotEmu (Irem Arcade Hits)
- Designer: Meeher
- Artists: Akio Oyabu; Takeshi Okui
- Composer: Takushi Hiyamuta
- Series: GunForce
- Platforms: Arcade, Macintosh, Microsoft Windows
- Release: Arcade: JP: July 1994; NA: September 1994; Irem Arcade Hits: NA/EU: 2011
- Genre: Run and gun
- Modes: Single-player, multiplayer
- Arcade system: Irem M-92

GunForce II (Note: Also known as Geo Storm (Japanese: ジオ ストーム, Hepburn: Jio Sutōmu) in Japan.) is a run and gun arcade video game released in 1994. It is one of the last arcade games Irem published before ceasing development of video games in the same year. It is the sequel to the 1991 arcade game GunForce. It is considered a spiritual predecessor to the Metal Slug franchise as many its developers went on to form the Nazca Corporation which developed the series for SNK. It is sometimes referred to as "Metal Slug Zero".

In GunForce II, players take control of Max and Lei through multiple stages battling against enemy soldiers and aliens, while rescuing POWs and collecting medals. Once again D.A.S., the persistent antagonist organization from previous games such as Air Duel, Undercover Cops and In the Hunt, threatens planet Earth and it is up to Max and Lei to stop D.A.S. GunForce II is the fourth and the last installment of D.A.S. tetralogy.

== Gameplay ==
Arcade version screenshot

GunForce II is a run and gun game where players take control of the soldiers Max (P1) and Lei (P2) across five stages that take place in a futuristic post-apocalyptic setting, battling against an army of enemy soldiers, mutants, aliens, among other types of enemies to fight, while rescuing female POWs and collecting medals along the way to increase their score at the end of each level. One of the unique features of the game is that the player's character are dual wielding two weapons at the same time that can be aimed in any given direction and at a slightly different angle each one, while different weapons scattered on the level are available to be collected, but only one can be upgraded as the other one keeps the default weapon.

As with the original GunForce, players may find a vehicle scattered in the current level they are in and there are eleven in total to be found through the course of the game, which the players can ride and use against the enemy forces and they tend to vary from level to level, but some of them do not provide any kind of protection for the player against enemy attacks. If the players lose all of their lives, the game is over unless more credits are inserted into the arcade machine to continue playing. Once all the stages are cleared, players are sent back to the beginning of the first level, as the game loops infinitely.

== Development and release ==
GunForce II shares many similarities with other previously released titles by Irem during the 1990s such as Air Duel, Cosmic Cop, Undercover Cops, In the Hunt and Superior Soldiers, due to being developed by most of the same personnel that would go on to form Nazca Corporation. The game was first showcased to the public at the 1994 AOU Show.

In October 2014, PlatinumGames producer Atsushi Kurooka revealed to a Twitter user that he worked on both GunForce II and Metal Slug (credited as A. Kurooka in the first title of the series), though Kurooka did not specify which role he was involved during the game's development.
