= List of arcade video games: Y =

This is a list of arcade video games organized alphabetically by name. It does not include PC or console games unless they were also released in video arcades. See Lists of video games for related lists.

Title	Alternate Title(s)	Year	Manufacturer	Genre(s)	Max. Players	PCB Model
Y.Y. Animal Land Jr.	Animalandia Jr. Exciting Animal Land Jr.	1993	Taito		1	
Yachtsman	Mermaid	1982	Sanritsu		2	
Yam! Yam!?	Wise Guy	1990	Dooyong			
Yamato	—	1983	Sega	Shooting gallery	2	
Yes/No Sinri Tokimeki Chart	—	1992	Taito		2	
Yie Ar Kung-Fu	—	1984	Konami	Versus Fighting	2	
Yori Zori Kuk Kuk	—	2002	Golden Bell			
Yosaku To Donbei	—	1979	Wing	Fixed shooter	2	
Yōjūden	—	1986	Irem	Scrolling shooter	2	
Yu-Jan	—	1999	Yubis		1	
Yu-Ka	—	1999	Yubis		1	
Yukon	—	1989	Exidy			
Yūyu no Quiz de Go! Go!	—	1990	Taito	Quiz	2	
