= Kid Niki: Radical Ninja =

1986 video game

- Japanese arcade flyer
- Developers: Irem; Tose (NES)
- Publishers: JP: Irem; NA: Data East (NES)
- Composers: Kouji Murata; Kenji Yamazaki
- Platforms: Arcade, Nintendo Entertainment System, Commodore 64, Apple II
- Release: Arcade: JP: December 1986; NES: JP: October 2, 1987; NA: November 1987
- Genre: Platform
- Modes: Single-player, multiplayer

Kid Niki: Radical Ninja, known in Japan as Kaiketsu Yanchamaru, (Note: Japanese: 快傑ヤンチャ丸, Hepburn: Kaiketsu Yanchamaru; lit. "The Wonderful Yanchamaru") is a 1986 platform video game developed and published by Irem for arcades. Initially released only in Japan, it was later released internationally by Data East in 1987 for the Nintendo Entertainment System. The arcade game runs on Irem-62 Hardware, the same as Kung Fu Master.

The differences between Kid Niki: Radical Ninja and Kaiketsu Yancha Maru are minimal. Aside from text translation, the most glaring difference is the main character's hair style. Kid Niki's hair is more "punk rock" with wild spikes and a ponytail in the back. Yancha Maru's hair has more subdued spikes and a topknot (or chonmage). In the arcade version of the game, the main character's keikogi is yellow while it is red in the home ports.

== Plot ==
One day in Feudal Japan, Kid Niki, the most radical of ninjas, is training at his Ninja School. Suddenly, a passing bird is struck down by an arrow and lands at Niki's feet. Attached is a note explaining that Niki's girlfriend, Princess Margo, has been kidnapped by the evil Stone Wizard. With the cry of "Will help you!" Niki bursts through the wall of his school and sets off on his quest to save Margo.

== Gameplay ==
Kid Niki is armed with the Spinning Sword, which according to the game's manual, "has been passed down from generation to generation from the School of Chirin".

In addition to the spinning sword, Kid Niki can gain extra offensive power by collecting Bells. The Golden Bell allows him to launch a projectile every time Kid Niki spins his sword, and the Silver Bell creates a spinning force field around him. Both of these power-ups last for a limited amount of time.

The game is divided up into seven rounds, with a boss character at the end of each one.

== Ports ==
Cover of the North American NES version

In 1987, Data East released ports of the game for the NES, Commodore 64, and Apple II. All home versions of the game show screen shots from the graphically superior arcade version on the back of their packages. Although it is an Irem game, the home ports were one of the more successful games released by Data East.

== Reception ==
Computer Gaming World called Kid Niki "yet another in the seemingly endless parade of horizontally-scrolling/running/jumping/shooting games" for the NES. While the reviewer stated that those who enjoyed such games would like the game, he wondered "how many of these interchangeable games Nintendo will authorize. Even devotees must be getting tired".

== Legacy ==
In Japan, two sequels appeared for the Famicom. The first was Kaiketsu Yanchamaru 2: Karakuri Land (快傑ヤンチャ丸２ からくりランド) in 1991, and the second was Kaiketsu Yanchamaru 3: Taiketsu! Zōringen (快傑ヤンチャ丸３ 対決！ゾウリンゲン) in 1993. Each of the three NES/Famicom titles feature radically different character designs.

A Game Boy sequel called Ganso!! Yanchamaru (元祖!! ヤンチャ丸) was released in 1991. This portable sequel is a unique game and not a port of one of the existing Kid Niki/Yanchamaru titles.

Kid Niki makes a cameo appearance in Irem's NES game Kickle Cubicle. To see Kid Niki, the player must hold down the A button on Controller 2, and then turn on the game. Then the player continues holding A until the title screen appears, and Kid Niki will appear. This trick also works on the Famicom version of Kickle Cubicle.

Kid Niki Radical Ninja was released by Hamster Corporation as part of their Arcade Archives series in January 2018 for the Nintendo Switch and PlayStation 4.

The NES version is considered by IGN to be the 49th best game to be released on the Nintendo Entertainment System.
