= Blademaster =

Blademaster or blade master may refer to:

- BladeMaster, a BBS door similar to The Pit
- Blade Master, a 1991 arcade game
- Blademaster (Transformers), a Decepticon helicopter Transformer introduced in Transformers: The Veiled Threat
- Blademaster (Warcraft), a hero in WarCraft III
- Musashiden II: Blade Master, see Musashi: Samurai Legend
- Blade Master Alastor, see List of characters in the Viewtiful Joe series
- Blade Master, a character class in Dungeon Fighter Online
- Blade Master, a character class in Mu Online
- Blade Master, the English title of Ator 2 - L'invincibile Orion (1984)
- Blademaster, a character class in Revelation Online

== See also ==
Master of Blades

- Drazhar, the Master Of Blades, see Dark Eldar
- Jindrax, Master of Blades, see Villains in Power Rangers: Wild Force

Master of the Blade

- Masters of the Blade, a book written by Rey Galang

Master of the Blades

- Master of the Blades, see Atha'an Miere

Other
