= Lightning Swords =

1991 video game

- Japanese arcade poster
- Developer: Nanao Corporation
- Publisher: Irem
- Platform: Arcade
- Release: 1991
- Genres: Hack and slash, beat 'em up
- Modes: Single-player, multiplayer

Lightning Swords, known in Japan as Ken-Go (剣豪), is a 1991 arcade video game developed by Nanao Corporation and published by Irem.

The game was an arcade-exclusive game until an emulated version was released in 2022 for the Evercade as part of Irem Arcade 1 cartridge.

== Gameplay ==
Lightning Swords is a side-scrolling hack and slash game set in feudal Japan where players control a duo of samurai brothers named Blue Dragon and Red Dragon. The game consists of five levels. The game has a single action button that controls the sword. By holding the button, the sword's power increases, and the longer the button remains pressed, the stronger the attack becomes once it's released (up to a maximum of five levels). The jumping is done by holding the joystick up. The player can take four hits before losing a life. The game includes a two-player co-op mode.

== Reception ==
Contemporary

Your Sinclair compared the game to Strider (1989) and said it introduces nothing new to the genre. They complained that the boss enemies take too many hits to defeat. Japanese trade press magazine Game Machine gave the game a rating of 5.53 out of 10.

Retrospective

Hardcore Gaming 101 summarized the game as "a fun, short, no-nonsense game that aims to do its own thing and does pretty well at it." Retro Gamer wrote: "This mediocre run-and-gun game starts off well, but quickly becomes a churn of recycled enemies, frustrating bosses and tedious and bland level design." Sega-16 compared the game to The Revenge of Shinobi (1989) and said: "With colorful graphics, a varied soundtrack, and interesting bosses, it wasn’t a bad way to spend a pocketful of quarters."
