= Undercover Cops: Hakaishin Garumaa =

1993 video game

- Front cover of Undercover Cops: Hakaishin Garumaa package showing Rosa Felmonde (known outside Japan as Flame). She wears a Hammerin' Harry keychain figure.
- Developer: Irem
- Publisher: Irem
- Composer: Kenji Yamazaki
- Platform: Game Boy
- Release: JP: December 10, 1993
- Genre: Traditional game
- Mode: Single-player

Undercover Cops: Hakaishin Garumaa (アンダーカバーコップス 破壊神ガルマァ), sometimes referred to with or without subtitle as Undercover Cops Gaiden (アンダーカバーコップス外伝), is a 1993 turn-based traditional game developed and published by Irem exclusively in Japan for the Nintendo Game Boy on December 10, 1993. It is a spin-off of Irem's 1992 beat 'em up arcade game simply titled Undercover Cops. It is also the second-to-last game Irem released for the Game Boy, with Daiku no Gen-san - Robot Teikoku no Yabō being the last.

== Gameplay ==
Zan fighting an opponent named Blood.

The player starts by choosing one of the three Undercover Cops: Zan Takahara (known outside Japan as Claude), Matt Gables (known outside Japan as Bubba) and Rosa Felmonde (known outside Japan as Flame). After that the player will move through the map in a board game pattern. During this part, the player will select one of two options: "SLOT" or "ITEM". To move through the pattern, the player must select "SLOT", then choose one out of five numbers he or she has. If the player selects a "2" or higher, the player will play a slot machine game (influenced by the ones seen during the "Assessment Day" segments after each stage before the final one in the Undercover Cops arcade game) that will randomly select either the number the player selected or any other number lower. For instance, if the highest number "10" was chosen, the slot machine will select between "10" and "1". If the player chooses a "1", the slot machine will not be played, while the player will move to one square. If the player selects "ITEM", he or she can use items they obtained throughout the game.

There are several different kinds of squares to step on. White squares do nothing, brown squares give money, black squares start either a battle or a minigame, "SHOP" squares allow players to buy items, "INN" squares allow players to rest and gain more hearts (or health), "777" squares will allow players to play a casino-like game to gamble, squares with magicians give something special, squares with fighting stick figures will start a boss battle, squares with a giant man on them will start a battle that costs money to learn a new normal attack move that will be randomly used along with the one the player already has, and squares with pictures of either city buildings, valleys or other environmental areas have civilians that will either give an advice, money, items or other stuff.

During a battle after stepping either on a black square, a square with a giant man (after spending money) or a square with a fighting stick figure, the player must choose the highest number he or she has while the CPU-controlled enemy randomly chooses a number. Whoever has the higher number than the other will "ATTACK", while the other will be in "DEFENSE". If both have an equal number, they'll have to select another number. In "DEFENSE" mode, the player must select one of three actions: "GUARD", "ITEM" or "RUN AWAY". "GUARD" allows the player to choose one of two parts of his or her chosen Undercover Cop's body part to make him or her protect, before choosing a number. The higher the number, the greater the player's chance at blocking or dodging the enemy's attack becomes if the enemy attacks anywhere in the body part the player defends. In "ATTACK" mode, while the enemy will randomly select a number, the player will first select one of three actions: "ATTACK", "ITEM" or "SP" (abbr. for "SPECIAL").

"ATTACK" allows the player to choose one of five of the enemy's body parts to attack at. After that, the player will select a number, the higher the easier he or she will successfully hit the enemy. In both "DEFENSE" and "ATTACK" mode, "ITEM" allows the player to use an item for support. "SP" (or "SPECIAL") allows the player to send a special move that will hit the opponent with greater damage than normal attacks without selecting the enemy's body part to attack at, but will drain the player's hearts (or health). "RUN AWAY" allows the player to either successfully flee from the enemy or be attacked by the enemy. After selecting a number in each part of each battle, a new number will randomly be drawn and added to both the player's and enemy's hands. If the player wins, he or she will earn a certain money and experiment (pr "EXP") points and return to the map screen. If the player loses, the game is over. In battles after stepping on a square with a giant man on it, the player only can select one of the enemy's body parts when in "ATTACK" mode, which means no "ITEM" or "SP" allowed.

== Reception ==
Famitsu review rated it 18 out of 40.
