= Steambot Chronicles: Battle Tournament =

2008 video game

- North American cover art
- Developer: Irem
- Publishers: JP: Irem; NA: Atlus
- Series: Steambot Chronicles
- Platform: PlayStation Portable
- Release: JP: July 10, 2008; NA: June 30, 2009
- Genre: Action-adventure
- Modes: Single-player, multiplayer

Steambot Chronicles: Battle Tournament (Note: Japanese: ポンコツ浪漫大活劇バンピートロット ビーグルバトルトーナメント, Hepburn: Ponkotsu Roman Daikatsugeki Bumpy Trot: Vehicle Battle Tournament; lit. Romantic Adventure Bumpy Trot Vehicle Battle Tournament) is an action-adventure game for the PlayStation Portable handheld that features a sandbox style of play. The game was developed by Irem in Japan and is published by Atlus in North America.

It is a spin-off of Steambot Chronicles, a 2005 PlayStation 2 title. A sequel to Steambot Chronicles, called Bumpy Trot 2, was announced and shown at the 2006 Tokyo Game Show, though it was officially cancelled in 2011. Blocks Club with Bumpy Trot is another spin-off title, originally released for the PlayStation 2 and later ported to the PlayStation Portable.

== Reception ==
Reception

Aggregate score
Aggregator	Score
Metacritic	54/100

Review scores
Publication	Score
Famitsu	28/40
GameZone	6.8/10
IGN	6/10
PlayStation: The Official Magazine	3/5

Battle Tournament received "mixed" reviews according to video game review aggregator Metacritic. In Japan, Famitsu gave it a score of all four sevens, for a total of 28 out of 40.
