= Metal Storm (video game) =

1991 video game

- North American box art
- Developer: Tamtex
- Publisher: Irem
- Director: Kengo Miyata
- Producer: Hiroshi Futami
- Programmer: Hikaru Yamashita
- Composer: Toru Watanabe
- Platform: Nintendo Entertainment System
- Release: NA: February 1991; JP: April 24, 1992
- Genres: Action, platform
- Mode: Single-player

Metal Storm is an action-platform video game developed by Tamtex and published by Irem for the Nintendo Entertainment System (NES). (Note: Metal Storm is known in Japan as Jūryoku Sōkō Metaru Sutōmu (重力装甲メタルストーム, lit. "Gravity Armor Metal Storm").) Irem released it in North America in February 1991 and in Japan on April 24, 1992. The game is defined by its central mechanic of the player's ability to reverse gravity at will, upon which all of its levels and challenges are built.

Its release garnered positive reviews and significant promotional support, including a cover feature in Nintendo Power. However, it was a commercial failure, largely attributed to its release at the end of the NES's lifecycle, as the market shifted to highly-anticipated 16-bit consoles like the Super Nintendo Entertainment System launching later that year.

In the years following its release, Metal Storm was critically reappraised through multiple eras of acclaim. It was first championed as an "unsung hero" by publications in the early 1990s and was later rediscovered by Internet-era retro gaming communities. Critics have consistently praised its innovative gameplay and technical feats that push the NES's limits, such as simulation of parallax scrolling. In 2019, its official re-release made the definitive Japanese version of the game widely available for the first time.

== Gameplay ==
The M-308 Gunner is using reversed gravity in Stage 6-2.

The core of Metal Storm's design is the player character's ability to reverse its gravitational polarity. By pressing the "Up" and "Jump" buttons simultaneously, the player instantly flips the M-308 Gunner mech between the floor and the ceiling. Other games of the era, such as Mega Man 5 and Strider, feature isolated segments with reversed gravity, but Metal Storm is built entirely around this concept so that every element from level layouts and enemy attack patterns to environmental hazards and boss encounters is designed to test the player's spatial awareness and mastery of this ability. Navigating a corridor becomes a complex puzzle of switching between surfaces to dodge projectiles, bypass barriers, and gain a positional advantage.

The game is structured across six stages, each divided into two acts, followed by a final seventh stage that is a climactic boss rush. The environment itself is the primary adversary, with hazards like laser emitters or crushing blocks that activate or deactivate depending on the player's orientation. Later stages feature screen-wrapping, where exiting one side of the screen causes the player to reappear on the other. This effect, combined with the gravity mechanic, demands absolute concentration.

The M-308 Gunner has a minimalist arsenal. The player has access to a limited selection of power-ups: a Power Beam, a defensive Shield, and a "Gravity Fireball" that provides temporary invincibility during a gravity flip. The player can hold only one of these items at a time. This scarcity of weaponry requires a reliance on movement and positioning over overwhelming force, which makes combat an extension of the platforming.

Upon completing the game, the player unlocks a second quest called Expert Mode. This is a comprehensive reworking of the entire game into a brutally unforgiving challenge. Most power-ups are removed, bosses have new and more complex attack patterns, and the enemy and hazard placements in every stage are completely reconfigured. Expert Mode shifts the experience from one of learning to one of absolute mastery, and the mode demands perfect level memorization and execution. Its design mirrors that of Irem's classic arcade games, retaining their steep difficulty while incorporating console-centric features like unlimited continues to allow players to practice and overcome the challenge.

== Plot ==
In 2501, humanity has colonized the Solar System. On a defense outpost on Pluto, a robotic laser cannon built to protect Earth from alien invaders begins to malfunction. It turns against its creators and starts destroying planets; its most recent target was Neptune. All attempts by Earth's forces to activate the station's self-destruct system have failed. In a last-ditch effort, players must take control of the M-308 Gunner, the most sophisticated combat mech available, to storm the Pluto base and manually trigger the self-destruct device before the cannon can destroy Earth. After the final boss is destroyed, the leaders of Earth grant the M-308 Gunner immortality and task it with protecting mankind from future threats.

== Development ==
Tamtex, a Tokyo-based subsidiary of the arcade giant Irem, developed Metal Storm. During the 8-bit era, Irem focused on in-house arcade development and frequently tasked Tamtex with creating and porting games for the Famicom and NES. Irem's heritage is deeply embedded in Metal Storm's design, which exhibits the steep but fair difficulty, emphasis on pattern recognition, and demand for precise execution characteristic of the publisher's arcade hits like R-Type.

The game is celebrated as a major technical achievement that pushes the NES hardware to its limits. Its most impressive feat is the widespread use of parallax scrolling, an effect where background layers scroll at different speeds to create an illusion of depth. The NES hardware did not natively support this feature, so the Tamtex programmers devised a workaround using a custom mapper chip in the cartridge and clever memory bank switching techniques to animate the background layers. This system allows for up to two independently moving background layers, an achievement described as "nearly unparalleled on the system". The game's visual prowess extends to its sprites and bosses. The M-308 Gunner is a large, fluidly animated sprite, and the bosses are massive, multi-part creations evocative of classic mecha anime, specifically resembling designs from series such as Mobile Suit Gundam and Macross.

The audio design is inconsistent; the sound effects are widely praised for their impact, with the sound accompanying the gravity flip being particularly distinctive, but the musical score is often cited as the game's weakest element, and many critics find it repetitive and forgettable.

The game's release history is highly unconventional. The North American version was released in February 1991, over one year before the Japanese version, Jūryoku Sōkō Metaru Sutōmu, launched on April 24, 1992. The Japanese version is a more complete and polished iteration, which suggests the North American release was an earlier, feature-incomplete build. The Japanese version includes a full cinematic introduction, additional dialogue, expanded story elements, a different color palette for the player mech, and restored credits for producer Hiroshi Futami.

== Release ==
Irem published Metal Storm in North America in February 1991. The game received substantial promotional support from Nintendo Power, the most widely read gaming magazine in the region at the time. Its March 1991 issue features Metal Storm on the cover and includes an extensive 12-page strategy guide.

In 2019, the game was officially re-released by Retro-Bit, in partnership with Limited Run Games. Jeremy Parish said this new cartridge-based edition is based on the superior Japanese Famicom version and was officially translated into English for the first time. This is a collector's edition including a figurine of the M-308 Gunner modeled after the iconic Nintendo Power cover.

== Reception ==
Reception

Review scores
| Publication | Score |
|---|---|
| ACE | 810/1000 |
| Computer and Video Games | 88/100 |
| Electronic Gaming Monthly | 7.75/10 |
| Famitsu | 24/40 |
| Game Players | 8/10 |
| Nintendo Power | 3.7/5 |
| Mean Machines | 88% |
| PlayStation Magazine (JP) | 18.9/30 |

Upon its release, Metal Storm garnered positive reviews. Electronic Gaming Monthly gave it a 7.75 out of 10, Computer and Video Games scored it 88/100, Mean Machines gave it an 88%, ACE rated it 810 out of 1000, Game Player's Strategy Guide to Nintendo Games gave it an 8 out of 10, Nintendo Power scored it 3.7 out of 5, and Japanese release received a 24 out of 40 from Famitsu. In a 1998 retrospective, the Japanese PlayStation Magazine gave it a score of 18.9 out of 30. Computer and Video Games called it a "slick, beautifully executed game", and Game Player's praised the "large, detailed sprites and multi-scrolling backgrounds", calling it a "must-buy" for action fans.

Metal Storm was a commercial failure, which is primarily attributed to its timing. By early 1991, the market was shifting to the new 16-bit console generation, and the Super Nintendo Entertainment System was set for its North American debut later that year. Because it was a new property on a waning console, Metal Storm was overshadowed.

In following years, the game’s reputation grew among retro gaming enthusiasts and publications. Nintendo Power included it in a 1993 feature on the "Unsung Heroes of the NES", complimenting its "inventive play control, great bosses and a level of challenge that was a cut above the average NES fare" but blaming low distribution and referencing itself as the "best marketing support the game ever received".

Modern retrospective reviews have been highly positive. IGN ranks it as the 46th best game on the NES, calling it a technological "tour de force" for its use of simulated parallax scrolling and advanced animation techniques. 1UP.com featured it in a list of "Hidden Gems" for the NES, praising the gravity gimmick for adding challenge and uniqueness, while also noting the game is quite difficult and rather short. In 2019, Jeremy Parish compared the difficulty of Expert Mode to modern "Kaizo" ROM hacks. Because of its enhancements, he regarded the Japanese Famicom version as the definitive "director's cut". In 2023, CBR ranked Metal Storm as the best NES game released shortly before the SNES, lauding its "innovative" and "well-implemented" gravity mechanic.

This growing acclaim, combined with its original low print run, made it a highly sought-after collector's item.
