= Deadly Towers =

1986 video game

- North American cover art
- Developers: Lenar; Tamtex
- Publishers: JP: Irem; NA: Broderbund
- Designers: Junichi Mizutari; R. Nagasu
- Composer: Yoshinobu Kasukawa
- Platform: Nintendo Entertainment System
- Release: JP: December 15, 1986; NA: September 1987
- Genre: Action role-playing
- Mode: Single-player

Deadly Towers is an action role-playing game co-developed by Lenar and Tamtex for Irem as a software title for the Nintendo Entertainment System (NES). It was released in Japan on December 15, 1986, and in North America in September of the following year.

In Japan, Deadly Towers was titled Mashō (魔鐘), literally meaning "Evil Bell". It is a pun of the word mashō (魔性), meaning "devilishness", and in keeping with this theme, the Japanese cartridge contained a red LED at the top which illuminated when turned on. The game's English-language title was intended to be Hell's Bells, but that name couldn't be used. In North America, it was one of Irem's three titles released in September 1987 on the NES, along with Spelunker and Sqoon.

== Plot ==
On the eve of his coronation ceremony, Prince Myer sits at a lakeside to ponder the future of his kingdom. Suddenly, a shadowy kami called Khan rises from the lake and coalesces into the form of a man. Khan doesn't identify himself, but he greets Prince Myer by name, and informs him that Rubas, the "Devil of Darkness", is preparing to overtake Willner Kingdom by using seven magic bells capable of summoning an army of monsters. To ensure peace, Khan says, Prince Myer must travel to the northern mountain to burn the seven bells in the sacred flame, burn down the seven bell towers in Rubas's magic palace and, ultimately, defeat Rubas himself.

The game begins outside Rubas's palace, a labyrinth filled with monsters. The player's objective is to kill Rubas. In order to do this, Prince Myer must first defeat the boss in each of the seven bell towers, collect the seven bells, and burn the bells in the sacred flame. Burning the bell also destroys the tower. When Prince Myer burns all seven bells, a door opens that leads to the final battle with Rubas.

== Gameplay ==
Prince Myer stands outside Rubas's palace.

Rubas's palace is presented in oblique perspective. The nonlinear gameplay is comparable to that of The Legend of Zelda. In most rooms of the palace, the screen does not scroll. Outside the palace and in the room containing the sacred flame, the room scrolls sideways; in bell towers, it scrolls vertically. Prince Myer can walk in eight directions, and he attacks by throwing a sword. The player earns coins (a currency called ludder) by killing monsters; ludder can be exchanged for new equipment at various shops. The shops are in fixed locations, but their inventories can change.

The main palace contains one long, horizontally scrolling room with the sacred flame and the entrances to 7 bell towers. At the top of each tower is a boss. The game's objective is to defeat the boss in each tower, collect the bell from each and destroy the bell collected (which destroys the tower as well) in the sacred flame in order to open the way to fight the final battle with Rubas.

To reach the main palace from the start of the game, the player must traverse an area containing 10 hidden dungeons. The first dungeon maze has 167 screens, and the tenth has 235. The entrances to the labyrinths are invisible and a specific room must be found to exit each dungeon. The dungeons also contain shops where items can be purchased.

Hidden throughout the towers are invisible portals to a secret areas called the Parallel Zones which resemble the towers, but are an alternate version, as well as Secret Rooms, in both of which the player can find equipment superior to that available in the shops.

== Development ==
Deadly Towers was the work of Japanese video game developers Lenar and Tamtex, the latter being owned by the same company as Irem. Lenar is credited both in the title screen and the end of the game, while Tamtex is mentioned only in the ending credits. The development team consisted of staff from both companies. On Lenar's side, the game was co-designed by a former employee from Namco (Junichi Mizutari), where he worked on the similar The Tower of Druaga.

Broderbund's relationship with Lenar was facilitated by Scott (Kenji) Tsumura, who worked for Irem and eventually worked for Broderbund to form the Kyodai Software division (and also later co-founded NST). Alan Weiss, the Nintendo Producer at Broderbund, managed all product development and worked with Lenar to translate the text of the game. Weiss kept the name, Prince Myer, to try to make faithful conversions and not "Americanize" it. The name, "Deadly Towers", came from Ed Bernstein of Broderbund. In response to the difficulty level of the game, Weiss said that they did not find it difficult to play when testing it, and that they wanted a more challenging game compared to other published titles.

== Legacy and reception ==
Deadly Towers and Rygar (whose NES release preceded Deadly Towers by a few months) were among the first Japanese action role-playing games to be published in North America. Computer Gaming World described Deadly Towers as a new kind of role-playing game that differed from both the console action-adventure games (such as Castlevania and Trojan) and American computer role-playing games (such as those in the series Wizardry, Ultima, and Might and Magic). Deadly Towers used a permanent power-up mechanic, which blurred the line between the power-ups used in action-adventure games and the experience levels used in RPGs. At the outset of the game, Prince Myer is comparatively weak: he can throw only one sword at a time, and some enemies take eight or more hits to defeat.

Deadly Towers was the best-selling title among Broderbund's four initial NES games and as a result it enjoyed a longer production cycle from the publisher than its contemporaries. While the game was not the subject of much press in its time and was commercially successful, it has received negative reviews in retrospective critiques. Sean Reiley, writing in 2001 for his comedy website Seanbaby.com, dismissed it as the worst Nintendo game of all time. In 2007, J. C. Fletcher of the video game blog Joystiq wrote that Deadly Towers is "the most frustrating game on the NES" and "the most frustrating game of all time". Even so, he also said that the game should be distributed through Nintendo's Virtual Console service.
