= Gekitotsu Yonku Battle =

1989 video game

- Developer(s): Tamtex
- Publisher(s): Irem
- Designer(s): Hiro Saito
- Composer(s): Ikuko Mimori
- Platform(s): Family Computer
- Release: JP: November 17, 1989
- Genre(s): Vehicular combat
- Mode(s): Single-player

Gekitotsu Yonku Battle (激突四駆バトル; "Four Wheel Drive Battle Clash") is a Japan-exclusive video game of the vehicular combat game genre released in 1989 by Irem for the Family Computer.

== Game description ==
The game is a top-down game, similar to games such as Micro Machines, Moto Roader, Jackal, among others.

Mechanically, the game consists of crashing cars within a limited stage with obstacles in the middle. Occasionally power-ups appear, one of which causes all cars on the screen to explode at the same time.

The goal is to eliminate all enemies and the players can only defeat them by making them crash into the obstacles or by turning around when they are behind the player and crashing into them head-on.

== Reviews ==
Four Famitsu reviewers considered the game to be refreshingly simple, focusing on ramming into and destroying enemy vehicles. They positively compared it to Rally-X while noting distinct differences, and appreciated its accessible controls requiring minimal skill. The reviewers highlighted how varying mechanics across stages helped maintain interest despite the basic premise. One reviewer felt that, while fun for short sessions, it needed more content to satisfy players used to modern gaming complexity.
