= Steambot =

A Steambot is a steam powered robot. For more info see steampunk. It could also refer to:

- Steambot Chronicles, a PS2 RPG.
