= Neo Turf Masters =

1996 video game

- Developers: Nazca Corporation; Saurus (NGPC)
- Publisher: SNK
- Producers: Takashi Nishiyama; Y. Kohdoh
- Programmer: H. Yamada
- Composer: Takushi Hiyamuta
- Platforms: Arcade, Neo Geo AES, Neo Geo CD, Neo Geo Pocket Color
- Release: January 29, 1996: Arcade; WW: January 29, 1996 Neo Geo AES; WW: March 1, 1996 Neo Geo CD; JP: May 3, 1996; NA: 1996 Neo Geo Pocket Color; JP: July 29, 1999; NA: July 31, 1999; EU: October 1, 1999
- Genre: Sports
- Modes: Single-player, multiplayer
- Arcade system: Neo Geo MVS

Neo Turf Masters (Note: Also known as Big Tournament Golf (Japanese: ビッグトーナメントゴルフ, Hepburn: Biggu Tōnamento Gorufu) in Japan.) is a 1996 golf video game developed by Nazca Corporation and published by SNK for the Neo Geo arcade and home systems. This is also one of the first two titles by Nazca before being acquired by SNK; the other series being the popular Metal Slug.

The game was released as an arcade cartridge (MVS) and as home cartridge (AES), as well as for the Neo Geo CD console. The Neo Geo version was later re-released as part of the SNK Arcade Classics Vol. 1 compilation for the PS2, Wii and PSP, as well as for the Wii Virtual Console. Developer DotEmu released a standalone iOS and Android port in 2016. Hamster Corporation re-released the game as part of their ACA Neo Geo series for the PlayStation 4, Xbox One, Nintendo Switch, Windows, Android and iOS (under the title Big Tournament Golf, due to a trademark conflict with Augusta National Golf Club over the "Masters" name).

A version for the Neo Geo Pocket Color was later released in North America in 1999. The NGPC version features cartoonish, less detailed graphics compared to the Neo Geo version which had partially digitized sprites and realistic art. This version was later re-released as part of Neo Geo Pocket Color Selection Vol. 1 in 2021.

Although improved for the Neo Geo platform, the game is in many ways similar to Major Title 2: Tournament Leader by Irem. This was because the game was programmed by a group of former Irem employees who had already worked on Major Title 2.

== Gameplay ==
Arcade version screenshot

The game is a fast-paced, arcade-style golf game. Players choose from two game modes, stroke play for one or two players, and match play for two players only.

Competing on one of four fictional golf courses located in the United States, Japan, Australia and Germany, players choose from one of six players with different attributes:

Unlike many golf games of the era which used a two-click swing system to determine the hook or slice of the ball, Neo Turf Masters uses a single click for the power of the shot, and a second for the height of the shot; hook and slice are selected with buttons B and C before making the shot. This makes the game much easier to pick up and play than its more technically demanding contemporaries, but it compensates for this reduced difficulty with fiendish (if somewhat unrealistic) course layouts and highly variable wind.

== Reception ==
In Japan, Game Machine listed Neo Turf Masters as the twelfth most-successful arcade game of March 1996.

IGN gave the Virtual Console release of the game 7.5 out of 10 stating "If you're the type of gamer who appreciates SNK's arcade style and can jibe with the idea of juiced-up, high-speed golf, Neo Turf might be well worth your 900 Wii Points".
