= Puzzle Guzzle =

2008 video game

- North American cover art
- Developer(s): Irem Software Engineering
- Publisher(s): JP: Irem; NA: Agetec; EU: DHM Interactive
- Platform(s): PlayStation Portable
- Release: JP: July 19, 2007; NA: February 26, 2008; EU: December 2, 2008
- Genre(s): Puzzle
- Mode(s): Single-player, Multiplayer

Puzzle Guzzle is a video game for the PlayStation Portable. This game is based on puzzles and you get assigned an avatar which can be customized during the game

== Gameplay ==
It's a block puzzle game where you spin sections of a puzzle as blocks fall in order to make triangular shapes match up for lines and shapes that roll into combos.
