= Mystic Riders =

1992 video game

- Developer: Irem
- Publisher: Irem
- Platform: Arcade
- Release: JP/NA: May 1992; EU: 1992
- Genre: Horizontal-scrolling shooter
- Modes: Single-player, multiplayer
- Arcade system: Irem M-92

Mystic Riders (Note: Known in Japan as Mahou Keibitai Gunhouki (Japanese: 魔法警備隊ガンホーキ, Hepburn: Mahō Keibitai Ganhōki; lit. 'Magic Guard Gunhawk').) is a 1992 arcade shoot 'em up video game released by Irem.

== Gameplay ==
Gameplay screenshot

Mystic Riders is a horizontal-scrolling shooter game.

== Development and release ==
Mystic Riders is one of the games available in the 2010 Irem Arcade Hits compilation for Microsoft Windows and Macintosh computers by Dotemu. It has also been announced as one of the titles included in the third volume of the Irem Collection for the PlayStation 4, PlayStation 5, Xbox One, Xbox Series X/S and Nintendo Switch, released on July 1, 2025.

== Reception ==
In Japan, Game Machine listed Mystic Riders on their July 1, 1992 issue as being the thirteenth most-popular arcade game for the previous two weeks. Japanese publication Micom BASIC Magazine ranked the game eleventh in popularity in its August 1992 issue. Sinclair User's John Cook praised the game's fantasy-themed visuals and gameplay, recommending giving it a chance. Hardcore Gaming 101's Kurt Kalata thought the game was visually unique and solidly designed, but felt the soundtrack could be better. Sega-16's Ken Horowitz considered it a fun title, praising its colorful graphical presentation and gameplay, but noted that it was easier than other Irem shoot 'em ups.
