= Major Title =

1990 video game

- Japanese arcade flyer
- Developer: Irem
- Publisher: Irem
- Composer: Masato Ishizaki
- Series: Major Title
- Platforms: Arcade, Super NES
- Release: Arcade: JP: February 1990; Super NES: NA: October 1992; JP: 4 December 1992; EU: 1993
- Genre: Sports (golf)
- Modes: Single-player, multiplayer

Major Title (Note: Japanese: メジャータイトル, Hepburn: Mejā Taitoru; also known as The Irem Skins Game in North America on Super Nintendo Entertainment System.) is a 1990 golf video game developed and published by Irem for arcades. A version of the game for the Super Nintendo Entertainment System and an arcade sequel, Major Title 2: Tournament Leader, were released in 1992. The SNES game and the arcade sequel were released in the United States as The Irem Skins Game.

The programmers of this game left Irem to found their own company named Nazca. The first game released by Nazca was Neo Turf Masters for Neo Geo in 1996; the game is very similar to Major Title 2.

== Gameplay ==
Arcade version screenshot

Major Title is an arcade-style golf simulation. The game is presented in a mixed perspective. The pre-shot perspective is a standard third-person view from just behind the golfer, but once the ball is hit, the view switches to a top-down perspective to track the ball in flight. The game takes a simplified approach to hitting the ball. Instead of setting the power and controlling the shot, the only function of the vertically oriented swing meter is to choose the vertical angle of the shot, which, in turn, sets the amount of backspin/topspin applied to the ball. The strength of each swing is selected prior to the shot by setting a power gauge to one of 16 levels. Draw and fade can be applied to the ball by changing the players stance. The game specifies the maximum distance for the putter in yards, but measures distance on the greens in meters.

Players can choose to play as one of four golfers (power hitter, all-round player, technician, and magician). Each of these golfers possess a unique skill set that influences the player's ability to make certain types of shots. The game provides the usual array of game modes: tournament, match play, stroke play, and a skins game. The control system is simple, but still involved enough to provide a decent level of control for a fourth generation video game console sports simulation game. The key mappings are as follows: D-pad- (Up & Down) Navigate menus, (Left & Right) alter value on sub menus (Club, Direction, Stance, Power). L and R shoulder buttons switch between the in-game sub menus, as does the (A) button. (B) button is used to take the shot and must be timed to be as close to the centre section of the power bar as possible.

== Reception ==
Reception

Aggregate score
Aggregator	Score
GameRankings	(SNES) 83%

Review scores
Publication	Score
AllGame	(SNES) 3.5/5
Consoles +	(SNES) 89%
Game Zone	(AC) 2.5/5
Joypad	(SNES) 83%
Joystick	(SNES) 85%
N-Force	(SNES) 86%
Nintendo Magazine System	(SNES) 61/100
Play Time	(SNES) 54%
Super Play	(SNES) 83%
Total!	(SNES) 2-
Video Games	(SNES) 58%
Your Sinclair	(Arcade) 82°/100°
Zero	(Arcade) 3/5

In Japan, Game Machine listed Major Title as the ninth most successful table arcade unit of April 1990. In the July 1990 issue of Japanese publication Micom BASIC Magazine, the game was ranked on the number sixteen spot in terms of popularity. The arcade original has been met with positive reception from reviewers since its initial release.
