= Battle Through Time =

1984 video game

- Developer: Anirog Software
- Publisher: Anirog Software
- Designer: Ken Grant
- Platform: Commodore 64
- Release: NA: 1984; EU: 1984
- Genre: Scrolling shooter
- Mode: Single-player

Battle Through Time is a video game for the Commodore 64 computer, programmed by Ken Grant. It is a side-scrolling shoot 'em up based on the arcade video game Moon Patrol.

== Gameplay ==
Gameplay screenshot

The basic gameplay is similar to Moon Patrol, in that the player has to drive a jeep through rough landscape and jump over potholes and obstacles, and shoot at enemies both on the ground and in the sky. The player has to travel ten miles in each level before they can progress to the next one.

Battle Through Time is themed after the most famous wars in the 20th century. It has seven levels, each with their own settings:

1. World War I
2. World War II
3. The Korean War
4. The Vietnam War
5. World War III
6. War Mutations, an alien-looking landscape almost devoid of enemies, only riddled with obstacles
7. In the Beginning, back to Stone Age, with a Tyrannosaurus rex as an end-of-level boss.

Each level has its own music theme, which consist of computer renditions of various famous melodies, such as Symphony #5 by Ludwig van Beethoven and The Blue Danube by Johann Strauss the Younger, and contemporary classics such as the Darth Vader theme.

== Reception ==
Reception

Review scores
Publication	Score
Big K	2/3
Home Computing Weekly	4/5
Computer Gamer	3/5

Big K gave the game an overall score of 'two Ks' out of three. Home Computing Weekly gave it four stars out of five. Computer Gamer gave it three stars out of five.
