= Image Fight =

1988 video game

- Arcade flyer
- Developer: Irem
- Publisher: Irem
- Platforms: Arcade, NES, PC Engine, X68000, FM Towns
- Release: October 1988: Arcade; JP: October 1988 NES; JP: March 16, 1990; NA: July 1990 PC Engine; JP: July 27, 1990 X68000; JP: December 14, 1990 FM Towns; JP: 1990
- Genre: Scrolling shooter
- Mode: Single-player

Image Fight (Note: Japanese: イメージファイト, Hepburn: Imēji Faito), also stylized as ImageFight, is a 1988 vertically scrolling shooter video game developed and published by Irem for Japanese arcades. It was ported to the Nintendo Entertainment System, PC Engine, X68000 and FM Towns in 1990. The NES version was the only version that was released in North America. It was followed by Image Fight II: Operation Deepstriker.

== Plot ==
The following is taken directly from the NES instruction manual:

On a fateful day in 20XX, the Earth's moon exploded into four large fragments and a multitude of meteors. Aliens from afar had succeeded in destroying the West's moon base. One after another, mankind's other military industrial space complexes were being lost. What mankind dreaded had come to pass. Scores of unidentified fighters were in the area. In addition, the moon's main computer, still intact after the explosion, had a strange vegetation coiled around it. Their trademark evil exploits being a dead giveaway, invaders from the Boondoggle Galaxy had arrived to take over the Earth. To counter these evil forces, leading scientists from all over the globe created the "OF-1" Fightership. Combat pilots depart the Earth to fend off the invaders and earn everlasting glory.

== Gameplay ==
Image Fight was released one year after Irem's successful horizontal scroller, R-Type, and, although not directly related, the two games have some similarities.

The player flies a futuristic red ship. The game begins with five stages taking place inside a combat simulation, and the player's ability to destroy enemy entities is tested. Upon finishing a simulation stage, the game displays results and shows if their score is considered passing or failing. The player must have an average kill rate of 90% or better in the simulation stages to immediately proceed to real combat. If the player fails, they must play an additional stage before entering real combat. Real combat consists of three stages. The real combat stages play much like a traditional shoot em' up game, where the player immediately proceeds to the next stage upon completing the current stage.

=== Pods ===
The defining feature of Image Fight is the Pod, a small, coloured sphere with two short gun barrels attached to it. The Pod, once collected, floats alongside the player's ship.

Screenshot of Image Fight (arcade version)

There are two different kinds of Pod:

- Red Pod – this changes direction based on the movement of the ship, and can therefore be aimed at enemies. This can be very useful, as enemies can and do attack from any direction.
- Blue Pod – similar to the Red Pod, except it always points forward and the direction cannot be changed. This makes it more powerful in direct confrontations, but less versatile.

The ship can support up to three Pods. The first two Pods collected will take up positions on the left and right sides of the ship; the third Pod hovers behind it.

==== Pod Shot ====
The Pod Shot is a special attack in which the side Pods are launched forward at high speed, before circling back and returning to the ship. This enables them to be used as projectiles themselves, and thrown at enemies ahead. This attack can be performed with either one or two side Pods; the rear Pod, if present, does not participate.

=== Speed control ===
The ship has four different levels of speed that the player can switch between, to allow for more precise manoeuvering in confined spaces. The structure of the ship transforms during a speed change, the wings angling down and back at higher speeds.

The ship's thrusters exhaust a large blue flame whenever the ship changes speed; this can be used as a weapon to damage or destroy enemies.

=== 'Forces' ===
The player can acquire various butterfly-shaped devices that attach to the front of the ship. These are similar in function to the Force in R-Type: they turn the player's blaster into a powerful laser weapon. They can also act as a weak shield, protecting the ship from impact; this destroys them but leaves the ship intact. Unlike the Force in R-Type, they cannot be ejected from the ship; the only way to remove them, in fact, is to have them destroyed. The ship cannot pick up a new device if one is already attached. There are a number of different kinds, each of which provides a different weapon. The weapon names are taken from R-Type Final. R-Type Final implies that these devices are in fact early versions of what it calls the OF Force, but this may be retroactive continuity.

== Ports and related releases ==
The arcade game was also ported for the Nintendo Entertainment System as well as becoming a Japan-only game for the PC Engine, X68000, and FM Towns in 1990. The PC Engine version was later re-released for the Wii Virtual Console only in Japan. In 1998, Image Fight, along with another arcade game by Irem, X-Multiply, was released only in Japan as a one-disc double-bill for the PlayStation and the Sega Saturn, titled AG Arcade Gears Image Fight & X-Multiply.

The arcade game was followed by Image Fight II: Operation Deepstriker, a sequel for the PC Engine Super CD-ROM² in 1992 exclusively in Japan. Like the PC Engine version of the first game, Image Fight II was re-released for the Wii U's Virtual Console in Japan in 2015 and for the first time in the United States in February 2018 for both games. Image Fight II and its PC Engine predecessor also made their European debut in February 2018.

Hamster Corporation released the arcade version as part of their Arcade Archives series for the Nintendo Switch and PlayStation 4 in 2019.

The ship from this game is included in R-Type Final, where it is the first in a series of five fighters called the OF series. The Pods are also available on fighters of the OF series.

== Reception ==
In Japan, Game Machine listed Image Fight as the most successful table arcade unit among operators surveyed during December 1988.

== Legacy ==
According to producer Hiroshi Iuchi, creator of Radiant Silvergun, Image Fight was the main inspiration for Radiant Silvergun's design. Tomonobu Itagaki, creator of the Dead or Alive series, listed Image Fight as one of his five favorite games. Image Fight is also said to be the favorite shooter game of Granzella's Kujo Kazuma.
