= Kickle Cubicle =

1988 video game

- Developer: Nanao
- Publisher: Irem
- Designer: Hiroya Kita
- Programmers: Kenji Nishi; Moichi Matsumoto
- Composer: Masahiko Ishida
- Platforms: Arcade, Nintendo Entertainment System
- Release: 1988
- Genre: Puzzle
- Modes: Single-player, multiplayer

Kickle Cubicle (Note: Known in Japan as Meikyūjima (Japanese: 迷宮島; lit. Labyrinth Island).) is a puzzle game developed by Irem for the arcades in 1988 and later ported to the Nintendo Entertainment System.

== Story ==
The protagonist Kickle wakes up one day to find his homeland, the Fantasy Kingdom, turned to ice by the Wicked Wizard King. The King has imprisoned the people in Dream Bags. Only Kickle was unaffected. Kickle sets out to save the kingdom with his special freezing breath, which he uses to turn the invaders into ice to use against his foes.

== Gameplay ==
The player must travel through the four lands in the Fantasy Kingdom, which Kickle plays in a set order. Each land has a boss at the end. After completing all four lands, the "special game" begins, consisting of 30 harder levels.

The player controls Kickle to solve a series of puzzles that take place on frozen islands. The goal of each level is to collect the red Dream Bags. There are several types of deadly enemies. Kickle can use his freezing breath ability to turn some enemies into ice to create walkways on water or to defeat other enemies. He can also create a pillar of ice in front of him to act as a block.

== Regional differences ==
- The Japanese version tends to have more enemies present in the various levels.
- In the Japanese version, the player can attempt the different levels of each world in any order. In the North American and European releases, the world order is fixed.

== Reception ==
Reception

Review score
Publication	Score
Electronic Gaming Monthly	8/10, 8/10, 7/10, 9/10 (NES)

In Japan, Game Machine listed Kickle Cubicle on their August 1, 1988 issue as being the thirteenth most-successful table arcade unit of the month.
