= Air Duel =

1990 video game

- Arcade flyer by Takashi Yamasaki
- Developer: Irem
- Publisher: Irem
- Platform: Arcade
- Release: March 1990
- Genre: Scrolling shooter
- Modes: Single-player, multiplayer
- Arcade system: Irem M-72 system

Air Duel (エア・デュエル, Ea Dyueru) is a vertically scrolling shooter game released for arcades by Irem in 1990. It was followed by an unofficial sequel called Air Assault in the west and Fire Barrel (ファイアーバレル) in Japan.

== Gameplay ==
Gameplay screenshot

The player selects from a jet fighter or attack helicopter, shoot enemies in the air and ground, collect power-ups, and defeat bosses to advance levels.

The game differs from most others in the genre in that the players can change the aircraft they use at the start of each level. The jet fighter always shoots straight forward; power-ups increase the width and strength of its shots. The helicopter fires thinner and weaker shots, but turns in the direction it moves (similar to the later Zero Gunner), giving it great range; powerups increase the strength of shots, as well as the number of bullets per shot (adding a small "spread" effect to the shot while moving around).

Both the fighter and the helicopter also start with three bombs which wipe out everything in their path, including enemy shots. These bombs are also unique compared to similar games, in that they produce a line of small horizontal blasts that can be "directed" at the line travels across the ground, by pressing left and right (similar to the helicopter's shots). Additional bombs can be picked up during the course of the game.

Losing a life resets the player's power and bomb count to the amount they start with. Later levels can become nearly unplayable if a single life is lost.

== Miscellaneous ==
All of GunForce II's music comes from Air Duel, though not all tracks were used and both games presumably took place in the same setting. The underwater path of the first mission of Metal Slug 3 features a melody which is a remix of Air Duel's 3rd & 10th stages' theme. All three games are known to have the same composer and likely the same staff.

== Reception ==
In Japan, Game Machine listed Air Duel on their July 15, 1990 issue as being the fourth most-successful table arcade unit of the month.
