= Kenzo Tsujimoto =

Japanese businessman (born 1940)

- Born: December 15, 1940 (age 85); Kashihara, Nara, Japan
- Occupation: Businessman
- Years active: 1960–present
- Known for: Founder of Capcom and Irem

Kenzo Tsujimoto (辻本憲三, Tsujimoto Kenzō; born December 15, 1940) is a Japanese businessman who founded the video game companies Capcom and Irem. He has also served as president of the Computer Software Copyright Association since 1997, and was president of Computer Entertainment Supplier's Association from 2002 to 2006.

== Biography ==
Tsujimoto was born in Kashihara, Nara, as the third son of a blacksmith. In 1956, after graduating from junior high school from his father's early death, he got a job at a nearby company, and at the same time entered the part-time system of Nara Prefectural Unebi Senior High School. After graduating from the school in March 1960, he got a job at an uncle's food wholesale company. In March 1963, he was transferred to the confectionery wholesale business run by his uncle and became independent, and although the company name was changed to Tsujimoto Shoten, he failed to manage and had a debt of several million yen.

In 1968, the confectionery retailer Tsujimoto Shoten was reopened in Osaka, and when the children lined up at the cotton candy making machine placed in the candy corner, it was not for the product itself, but for the process of making cotton candy. Two years later, Tsujimoto was peddling all over the country for the performance of selling this cotton candy making machine, and on his way home, he was entrusted with the modification of the pachinko machine and sold 1,000 units per model, so he was convinced that game entertainment would grow in the future.

In July 1974, Tsujimoto founded IPM, which became Irem and became its president. He established I.R.M. Corporation on May 30, 1979, and IRM changed its name to Sambi in 1981. The company released "IPM Invaders" and "Capsule Invaders" under license from Taito during the Invaders game epidemic. However, at Irem, Tsujimoto who was the chairman, was forced out because of poor performance due to the retreat of the Invaders boom.

On June 11, 1983, he founded Capcom as a sales company for Sambi and became president and representative director. In July of the same year, the company's first game Little League was released. In 1989, Sambi, which was developed, absorbed and merged with Capcom, which was in charge of sales, and changed the name of the surviving company, Sambi, to Capcom, and Tsujimoto continued to serve as president.

In the 1990s, Tsujimoto established his fourth company "Kenzo Estate" as a winery as a sole proprietorship. He purchased 1,500 hectares of land in Napa, California, USA, which had been idle due to Capcom's business failure, from Capcom for 7 billion yen, and made it privately owned by Tsujimoto. First shipped in 2008, this winery's white wine "Asatsuyu" was selected as one of the "best wines" by a magazine for the wealthy in the United States in 2011.

In 2001, Tsujimoto became chairman and CEO of Capcom.

In 2016, Tsujimoto opened Kenzo, a Michelin-starred Japanese restaurant, on the Kenzo Estate land.

== Personal life ==
Tsujimoto's older son, Haruhiro, has served as Capcom's President and COO since 2007. His younger son, Ryozo, is a producer of the Monster Hunter series. He also holds an interest in winery.

== Honours ==
- 1980 – Medal of Honor with Dark Blue Ribbon
- 2007 – Medal of Honor with Blue Ribbon
