= X Multiply =

1989 video game

- Arcade flyer
- Developer: Irem
- Publisher: Irem
- Platform: Arcade
- Release: JP: September 1989; NA: March 1990
- Genre: Scrolling shooter
- Modes: Single-player, multiplayer

X Multiply (Note: Japanese: Xマルチプライ, Hepburn: Ekkusu Maruchipurai) is a horizontally scrolling shooter video game developed and published by Irem for arcades. It was released in Japan in September 1989 and North America in March 1990.

== Gameplay ==
The game itself is a side-scroller like R-Type, albeit with a short vertical-scrolling area towards the end of the sixth level. Instead of the Force pod, however, the main power-up apparatus takes the form of two flexible tentacles. The tentacles are invulnerable to all enemy attacks, and can be positioned with careful maneuvering of the X-002.

== Plot ==
The game centers around an unusual alien invasion against a colony planet in the year 2249—the aliens themselves are microscopic creatures that invade, infect, and kill the colonists. Scientists have deployed the microscopic fighter X-002 into the body of a person who has been invaded by the alien queen.

== Reception ==
In Japan, Game Machine listed X Multiply on their November 1, 1989 issue as being the eighth most-successful table arcade game of the year.

== Legacy ==
An emulated version was released with Image Fight on the PlayStation and Sega Saturn in 1998. Hamster Corporation released the game as part of their Arcade Archives series for the Nintendo Switch and PlayStation 4 in 2019.
