= Napoleon Senki =

1988 video game

- Developer: Lenar
- Publisher: Irem
- Platform: Family Computer
- Release: JP: March 18, 1988; NA: Cancelled
- Genres: Historical strategy Real-time tactics
- Mode: Single-player

Napoleon Senki (ナポレオン戦記; "Battles of Napoleon") is a real-time tactics strategy video game developed by Lenar and published by Irem in March 1988 for the Family Computer. In August that same year, Broderbund announced that it would be released for the North American NES console as The Battlefields of Napoleon, which was eventually cancelled.

This video game allows the player to re-enact the Napoleonic Wars using a bird's-eye view. Starting with earliest battles against the Holy Roman Empire to grab territory for the fledgling French Republic during the French Revolutionary Wars in the year 1796, Napoleon would guide the French Revolutionary Wars until they ended in 1802. All the nations that were a participant in the Napoleonic Wars were included like the Russian Empire, Great Britain, and the Spanish Empire. Napoleon's first in-game battle would located in present-day Italy, making the battle equally important in Italian history as it was in French history. There are also battles in Egypt against the Ottoman Empire along with various other conquests in Europe.

== Gameplay ==
This is a screenshot of a player re-enacting one of Napoleon Bonaparte's earliest campaigns.

Before each battle, a summary screen is revealed (stating the situation and the military strength of each of the forces). There is also a simple map of Europe with dots on it so the player always knows the exact location of all the possible battles, but the map information is given out in Japanese. An interesting feature of the time was that the altitude of mountains were accurately depicted in the actual battlefields. The deeper the color was, the higher the altitude of the mountain was. For example, light brown represents small hills while dark brown either represents gigantic mountains or the large peaks of a mountain.

The object is to win each battle using late 18th and early 19th century warfare tactics so that Napoleon Bonaparte has a chance of conquering all of Europe. Infantry, artillery (cannonballs give them the ability to blow up walls), and cavalry must be properly used for victory and a successful re-enactment of France's unique and colorful past. Soldiers are divided into three categories: friendly soldiers, potential defects, and enemy soldiers. Friendly soldiers must be given commands of north, south, east, west or halt. When a player confront a group of potential defects, there is no battle and the soldiers in the unit of defects joins the platoon that discovered them. Enemy troops can be fought either automatically or manually (with commands of advance, retreat, sideways, or halt can be given to each individual soldier).

Each type of soldier has its own strengths and weaknesses. For example, the cavalry are the fastest while the swordsmen are the most powerful and the riflemen have the longest range. There is a Japanese language write-up about the history of each unit type, the tactics are used in-game, and a quick military parade with Napoleon Bonaparte leading his troops into battle.
