= Ninja Baseball Bat Man =

1993 video game

- Arcade flyer
- Developer: Irem
- Publisher: Irem
- Designer: Drew Maniscalco
- Programmer: Shinichi Hamada
- Platform: Arcade
- Release: WW: October 1993; Bases Loaded: WW: December 10, 2026
- Genre: Beat 'em up
- Modes: Single-player, multiplayer

Ninja Baseball Bat Man (Note: Known in Japan as Yakyū Kakutō League Man (Japanese: 野球格闘リーグマン, Hepburn: Yakyū Kakutō Rīgu Man; lit. "Baseball Hand-to-Hand Fighting League Man").) is a 1993 beat 'em up arcade video game developed and published by Irem. The object of the game is to recover various artifacts stolen from the Baseball Hall of Fame, a task prescribed to them by the Commissioner of Baseball. Each stage takes place in several parts of the United States. Each player chooses from among four characters: Captain Jose, Twinbats Ryno, Beanball Roger, and Stick Straw. Up to four players can play simultaneously. An HD remake with new features, titled Ninja Baseball League-Man: Bases Loaded, is set to be released on December 10, 2026, for Microsoft Windows, Nintendo Switch 2, PlayStation 5, and Xbox Series X/S.

== Gameplay ==
In the first level

Like Irem's previous beat 'em up arcade game, Undercover Cops, Ninja Baseball Bat Man features playable characters with several different fighting moves that sacrifices health in order to annihilate every enemy on the screen. The game allows players to perform combos, throws and dash attacks against several enemies. When a player's health bar flashes red, more moves can be performed as long as the player does not restore or completely lose health. There are items throughout the game that include American and Japanese food for restoring health, alternate weapons such as baseballs and shurikens, or items that call cheerleaders to either obliterate enemies on screen or drop a large amount of food. There are also mini-games after each boss before the final one is defeated.

== Development ==
Irem America opened its U.S. office in 1988 in Redmond, Washington, headed up by Frank Ballouz (founder of Fabtek, a thriving video kit company and former North American publisher of several arcade machines by Seibu Kaihatsu and TAD Corporation) and National Sales Manager Drew Maniscalco. During this time, Drew created the "Ninja Baseball Bat Man" video game concept (including the English title, plot and characters) and licensed it to Irem America in 1991.

Drew's concept came up after he read the top-grossing films during its time in a USA Today newspaper. One was Teenage Mutant Ninja Turtles; the other was one of the Batman films (possibly Batman Returns). After that, he started creating his own superhero influenced by what he saw in the USA Today newspaper. During the development of his concept, he liked the word ninja, because of it sounding mysterious to him. He gave the protagonists baseball bats and baseballs as their main weapons, as well as dressing them in baseball uniforms, because Drew is a baseball fan. Drew thought the baseball bat idea was also probably influenced by the 1973 film Walking Tall. This was also how he came up with the game's English title. In Japan, however, Irem of Japan's staff came up with the game's Japanese name as a reference to numerous tokusatsu television shows, most notably the Super Sentai series. Drew later created the concept for the other characters such as enemies. To illustrate the characters' sketches, Drew hired Gottlieb pinball artist Gordon Morison.

Drew's original gameplay ideas for the video game was for a 1-player, adventure-based, platform game similar to Nintendo's Super Mario Bros., but due to the very successful game sales of several 4-player games (most of them being beat 'em ups), Drew added 3-players in an effort to compete with the 4-player games. While the title and characters were Drew's concept, Irem Japan programmed the arcade game, and modified the look of its prototype. Drew did not mind it being different, as he was thrilled about it being programmed by them.

During the development of the two-player platform version, the two main characters were named "Willie" and "Mickey", named after Drew's two favorite baseball players of his childhood, Willie Mays and Mickey Mantle. During the development of the 4-player beat 'em up version, the prototype names of the four main characters were Captain Jeff (red), Nunchaks Sugar (green), Hammer' Eddy (yellow) and Naginata Jimmy (blue). Drew later came up with the final names of the four protagonists that are currently used in the finished version today, which the names are references to the four baseball stars during the arcade game's release: Jose Canseco (red), Ryne Sandberg (green), Roger Clemens (yellow) and Darryl Strawberry (blue). In Japan, their last names were changed to the names of their colors.

== Reception and legacy ==
Upon its 1993 release, it was an arcade hit in Japan and received good reviews from critics. It sold 1,042 arcade units worldwide, including 489 units in Japan and 510 units in other Asian countries. However, it sold poorly in North America, where only 43 units were sold, making Ninja Baseball Bat Man quite rare in the US. Drew "was very disappointed" with the effort by the US office. Despite this, the popularity of the arcade emulator MAME caused Ninja Baseball Bat Man to gain more popularity years later than it had when originally released.

A year after its concept was created and a year before it was released, despite it being interesting in his opinion, Drew left the company in 1992 and moved to Data East USA. Because of that, he was unable to market nor manage any other input related to the game, but according to his interview with GameRoom, he now owns the rights to Ninja Baseball Bat Man's non-video game products, while Irem Japan owns the rights to its video game content. Drew currently works at Andamiro USA.
