= GunForce =

1991 video game

- Developers: Irem; Bits Studios (SNES)
- Publisher: Irem
- Series: GunForce
- Platforms: Arcade, Super NES
- Release: Arcade: JP: April 1991; NA: September 1991; SNES: NA: November 1992
- Genre: Run and gun
- Modes: Single-player, multiplayer
- Arcade system: Irem M-92

GunForce (also known as GunForce: Battle Fire Engulfed Terror Island) is a side-scrolling run and gun video game produced by Irem for arcades in 1991. The game was ported by Bits Studios and published by Irem for the Super Nintendo Entertainment System in 1992. The sequel, GunForce II, was originally known in Japan as Geo Storm.

== Gameplay ==
Arcade screenshot

The player is armed with a gun that fires rapid-fire bullets. Each direction it shoots can be fixed toward it so the player doesn't have to hold the joystick toward it. Players may find motorcycles to speed across enemy territory faster in addition to helicopters and cable cars.

After scoring over any high score, whether they win or lose, players can enter their name into the high score list after the game over screen is "achieved". A strict time limit keeps the game going at a steady pace throughout; the consequence involves losing a life.

== Plot ==
Parachuted out of a bomber, the player has landed into hostile territory to defeat the enemy who is threatening Mother Earth.

== Reception ==
Reception

Aggregate score
| Aggregator | Score |
|---|---|
| GameRankings | (SNES) 60.25% |

Review scores
| Publication | Score |
|---|---|
| Famitsu | (SNES) 18/40 |
| Nintendo Power | (SNES) 3.075/5 |
| Consoles + | (SNES) 71% |
| Famimaga | (SNES) 17.89/30 |
| Joypad | (SNES) 79% |
| Joystick | (SNES) 67% |
| N-Force | (SNES) 70% |
| Play Time | (SNES) 67% |
| Sinclair User | (Arcade) 79% |
| The Super Famicom | (SNES) 60/100 |
| Super Play | (SNES) 59% |
| Super Pro | (SNES) 48% |
| Video Games | (SNES) 39% |
| Zero | (Arcade) 2/5 |

In Japan, Game Machine listed GunForce on their July 1, 1991 issue as being the tenth most-successful table arcade unit of the month. In the September 1991 issue of Japanese publication Micom BASIC Magazine, the game was ranked on the number fifteen spot in popularity.
