= The Battle-Road =

1984 video game

- Screenshot
- Developer: Irem
- Publisher: Irem
- Platform: Arcade
- Release: JP: 1984
- Genre: Vehicular combat
- Modes: Single-player, 2 players alternating
- Arcade system: Irem M-62

The Battle-Road is a vertically scrolling vehicular combat game released in arcades by Japanese video games developer Irem in 1984. The player controls a car armed with two types of guns (frontal and side) and drives on a road full of dangerous enemy vehicles, such as cars, motorcycles, trucks and helicopters. The player can shoot enemies along the way, who can shoot back. It has branching paths resulting in 32 possible routes.

== Reception ==
In Japan, Game Machine listed The Battle-Road on their November 15, 1984 issue as the seventh most-successful table arcade unit of the month.
