= Lot Lot =

1985 video game

- Family Computer cover art
- Developers: Irem; HAL Laboratory (Famicom)
- Publishers: Irem (arcade); Tokuma Shoten (home platforms)
- Platforms: Arcade, Family Computer, MSX, NEC PC-8801
- Release: Arcade: JP: September 1985; Family Computer: JP: December 21, 1985; MSX: JP: 1985; PC-8801: JP: 1986
- Genre: Puzzle
- Mode: Single-player or multiplayer video game (1-2 players)

Lot Lot (ロットロット, Rotto Rotto) is a multiplatform puzzle video game developed and published by Irem. Tokuma Shoten published the game on home platforms, including the Famicom.

The player controls one arrow and has to move some pellets (which resemble pachinko balls) from the upper cells (with a four-second delay) to the lower ones without having to confront an evil crab. He will grab the player's pellets and try to prevent the player from scoring with them by cutting the elastic. The crab is forced to leave the board if there are no pellets for him to find.
