= Blokus Portable: Steambot Championship =

2005 video game

- Developer: Tomcat System
- Publishers: JP: Irem; NA/EU: Majesco
- Series: Steambot Chronicles
- Platforms: PlayStation 2, PlayStation Portable
- Release: PlayStation 2: JP: November 17, 2005; PlayStation Portable: JP: September 21, 2006; NA: February 27, 2008; EU: October 3, 2008
- Genre: Puzzle
- Modes: Single-player, multiplayer

Blokus Portable: Steambot Championship, known in Japan as Blokus Club with Bumpy Trot (ブロックス倶楽部 with バンピートロット, Burokkusu Kurabu with Banpītorotto), is a 2005 puzzle video game developed and published by Irem Software Engineering for the PlayStation 2 and later ported to the PlayStation Portable in Japan. The PlayStation Portable version was later published outside Japan by Majesco. It is based on the board game Blokus and features characters from Steambot Chronicles (known in Japan as Bumpy Trot). Like in Steambot Chronicles, players are able to customize the appearance of their characters.

== Gameplay ==
Each player receives a pile of blocks that resemble polyominoes. Players must place blocks on the board starting at the corners and then extend it from the corners of the pieces they have placed. The game is over when no one can place any more pieces. The player with the fewest pieces remaining wins.

== Reception ==
Reception

Aggregate score
Aggregator	Score	
Aggregator	PS2	PSP
Metacritic	N/A	51/100

Review scores
Publication	Score	
Publication	PS2	PSP
Famitsu	22/40	N/A
GamesRadar+	N/A	2/5
IGN	N/A	5/10

In Japan, Famitsu gave the PlayStation 2 version a score of two sixes and two fives, for a total of 22 out of 40. Elsewhere, the PSP version received "mixed" reviews according to video game review aggregator Metacritic.
