= Nazca Corporation =

Japanese video game company; creators of Metal Slug series

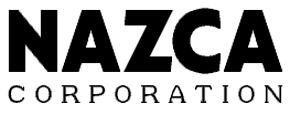
- Trade name: Nazca
- Native name: 株式会社ナスカ
- Romanized name: Kabushiki gaisha Nasuka
- Type: Kabushiki gaisha
- Industry: Video games
- Founded: May 1994; 32 years ago
- Defunct: October 1996; 29 years ago
- Fate: Acquired by SNK then folded
- Headquarters: Suita, Osaka, Japan
- Area served: Japan
- Key people: Yoshihiko Kodo (president)
- Products: Video games
- Number of employees: Approx. 30 (1996)
- Parent: SNK

Nazca Corporation (Note: Japanese: 株式会社ナスカ, Hepburn: Kabushiki gaisha Nasuka) was a Japanese video game company that developed games for the Neo Geo console. The company was formed in 1994 by a group of arcade manufacturer Irem employees after the shutdown of its video game division and became a subsidiary of SNK in 1996. It is best known for creating the Metal Slug franchise.

== History ==
R-Type II's graphical style bears great similarity to what this team is known for. However, it is generally thought their first game was Air Duel; they would later make games such as Armed Police Unit Gallop, Undercover Cops, Pound For Pound, Ken-Go, and In the Hunt. Their final game for Irem was GunForce II, after which they left and created Nazca, creating Neo Turf Masters and Metal Slug; the latter shares many stylistic similarities to the previous Irem works and both titles were made with the same development kits used for several Irem arcade games. SNK, impressed by the success of Nazca's titles, formally acquired the developer, and would make the second and third Metal Slug games. The team disbanded after SNK filed for bankruptcy in 2001.

Nine of the original Nazca staff (including planner Meeher, designers Akio and Susumu, and development manager Kawai) answered questions from an undated text interview that was translated and included in Metal Slug Anthology.

Because the common use of pseudonyms in arcade titles to hide identities, details of its staff remains scarce. One known key member is composer Takushi Hiyamuta (credited with names such as "HIYA!" and "HIYA-UNIT"), responsible for composing nearly every game listed here, in whole or part (he did not compose for Kaitei Daisensou; also, although he did not compose for R-Type II, he did for Super R-Type). He was considered part of SNK's in-house band, the "Shinsekai Gakkyoku Zatsugidan" ("New World Music Acrobatics"). He was interviewed for the Metal Slug Complete Sound Box released in 2008. The only works he is credited for since Metal Slug 3 are Yuusha 30, and producer on Sammy Corporation's Dolphin Blue, a credit he shares with fellow Nazca staffer KOZO. He currently works as a freelance musician, serving as the lead guitarist in the rock band GRowTH.

Graphic designer Akio worked for SNK after their bankruptcy in 2001, serving as the lead character designer for Metal Slug Anthology, and as character designer for Metal Slug XX. His final involvement with the company was the design of Metal Slug protagonist Marco Rossi for 2010's Neo Geo Heroes: Ultimate Shooting, released a few months after Metal Slug XX. Other contributions he made directly for the company are currently unknown. He currently works as a freelance artist, remaining fairly active on Japanese art website Pixiv, and has contributed illustrations to Mobius Final Fantasy and Street Fighter V: Arcade Edition. He created a Twitter account in early April 2023, and would later begin to post design documents from Metal Slug.

Kazuma Kujo, credited as KIRE-NAG in the first Metal Slug, went on to form Granzella after leaving both Irem and Nazca, but declined to comment on the status and identity of key staff members including lead designer Meeher and graphic artists Akio and Susumu. While he was responsible for the design of the gameplay, he left Nazca prior to Metal Slug's release due to internal disputes but has maintained friendship with the developers.

In May 2023, Akio Oyabu, Meeher, Kuichin, Takushi Hiyamuta and Shinichi Hamada reunited and announced they are developing a spiritual successor titled Black Finger JET for Steam under Kodachi Studio, with Märchen Forest developer Shinano Ishiguro serving as director.

== Staff ==
Due to the common use of pseudonyms in arcade titles to hide identities, details of its staff remains scarce. However, various individuals have been important figures in the history of Nazca Corporation:

- Yoshihiko Kodo - Former Irem executive and president of Nazca Corporation. Later appointed as president of SNK. Executive producer for Metal Slug X.
- Takashi Nishiyama – Creator of Moon Patrol, Street Fighter and Fatal Fury. Head of development for Metal Slug. Later founded Dimps.
- Kinte – Team leader for R-Type. Chief designer for Neo Turf Masters.
- Kazuma Kujo – Co-designer for Metal Slug under the pseudonym "Kire-Nag". Later formed Granzella.
- Meeher (みぃはぁ) – Co-designer for Metal Slug. Left SNK after their initial bankruptcy, but would return in 2003 to be a part of their pachislot division. He was also instrumental in helping Kazuma Kujo starting up Granzella.
- Atsushi Kurooka – Programmer for Metal Slug. Previously worked on GunForce II at Irem. Later worked at PlatinumGames on The Wonderful 101.
- Kenji Andō – Programmer for Metal Slug under the pseudonym "Andy".
- Shinichi Hamada – Programmer for Metal Slug under the pseudonym "Hamachan".
- Akio Oyabu – Character designer for R-Type. Artist for Metal Slug. Later worked as freelancer on several projects. Currently active on Pixiv.
- Susumu - Background artist for several Irem titles and Metal Slug. Like Akio, he became a freelance illustrator.
- Kazuhiro Tanaka – Artist for Metal Slug under the pseudonym "Max.D".
- Takeshi Okui – Artist for Metal Slug. Later worked at Squaresoft and Monolith Soft on several projects.
- Takushi Hiyamuta – Composer for Neo Turf Masters and Metal Slug under the pseudonym "Hiya". Later worked as freelancer on several projects.

Atsushi Inaba, formerly of Capcom and current CEO at PlatinumGames, was a member of Nazca after leaving Irem, doing income management, then SNK after its acquisition, rekindling his interest in video game development. Although details were never delved, Inaba stated he did programming work on a Samurai Shodown title and was unhappy with his experience at SNK. R-Type composer Masato Ishizaki was also a member of Nazca.

== Games ==
=== Developed ===
| Year | Title | Original platform(s) | Rereleases | Publisher | Co-developer |
|---|---|---|---|---|---|
| 1996 | Neo Turf Masters | Arcade, Neo Geo AES, Neo Geo CD, Neo Geo Pocket Color | Android, iOS, Linux, Macintosh, PC | SNK | Saurus (NGPC), Dotemu (Mobile/PC) |
| 1996 | Metal Slug | Arcade, Neo Geo AES, Neo Geo CD, PlayStation, Sega Saturn | Android, iOS, Linux, Macintosh, PC, PlayStation Network | SNK | SNK (SS), Ukiyotei (PS), M2 (PSN), Dotemu (Mobile/PC) |
| 1998 | Metal Slug 2 | Arcade, Neo Geo AES, Neo Geo CD | Android, iOS, Linux, Macintosh, PC, PlayStation Network | SNK | M2 (PSN), Dotemu (Mobile/PC) |
| 1999 | Metal Slug X | Arcade, Neo Geo AES | Android, iOS, Linux, Macintosh, PC, PlayStation | SNK | Prosoft Corporation (PS), Dotemu (Mobile/PC) |
| 2000 | Metal Slug 3 | Arcade, Neo Geo AES | Android, iOS, Linux, Macintosh, PC, PlayStation 2, PlayStation 4, PlayStation Network, PlayStation Vita, Switch, Xbox, Xbox 360 | SNK | Noise Factory (PS2), Dotemu (Mobile/PC), Code Mystics (PSN) |
