= Superior Soldiers =

1993 video game

- North American arcade flyer
- Developer: Irem
- Publisher: Irem
- Platform: Arcade
- Release: JP: December 9, 1993; US: February 1994
- Genre: Fighting
- Modes: Single-player, multiplayer

Superior Soldiers, known in Japan as Perfect Soldiers (Note: Japanese: パーフェクトソルジャーズ, Hepburn: Pāfekuto Sorujāzu), is a 1993 fighting video game developed and published by Irem for arcades. It was created during the fighting game trend of the 1990s that began with Capcom's Street Fighter II. Several graphic designers of this and several other Irem titles later moved to Nazca, and designed the graphics of the Metal Slug franchise for SNK.

== Characters ==
Gameplay screenshot showcasing a match between Arabian Moon and Meltdown.

There are eight fighters in the game:

- Star Savior (スターセイバー) (known outside Japan as Starsaber, but the back of the North American arcade flyer spells his name as Star Sabor) is the protagonist character of the game.
- Arabian Moon (アラビアンムーン) is a female fighter dressed as a scantily-clad dancer.
- Meltdown (メルトダウン) - a nuclear human remodeled with a built-in battery.
- Broadway (ブロードウェイ) (known outside Japan as Cattydox) is a female strip dancer.
- Bushidoh (ブシドー) (known outside Japan as Busido) is an armoured male samurai.
- Dinosaur (ダイナゾア) (known outside Japan as Reptilian) is the dinosaur with a personality that isn't violent.
- Evil Talon (エビルタローン) (known outside Japan as Satinsect) is a mutant that has been turned into a man-eating monster by corruptive force of Bydo. It sees everything as meals to be consumed.
- Seleous (セレウス) (known in North America as Skull Reaper) is the antagonist of the game. Upon defeat, an entity emerges from its body identifying itself as Bydo, a reference to the antagonist of Irem's R-Type series.

== Regional differences ==
Besides the names of several characters, the North American version, Superior Soldiers, lacks other things that are seen in the Japanese version, Perfect Soldiers. The Japanese version has an announcer shouting the name of the game at the title screen, as well as names of "who VS. who" at the VS. screens in Engrish, but the well-known "Winners Don't Use Drugs" screen and new color graphics were added to the North American version.
