= Yōjūden =

1986 video game

- Developer(s): Irem
- Publisher(s): Irem
- Platform(s): Arcade
- Release: JP: 1986
- Genre(s): Shooter
- Mode(s): Single-player, multiplayer

Yōjūden (Note: Japanese: 妖獣伝, Hepburn: Yōjū-den; lit. "Legend of the Monsters") is a 1986 shooter video game developed and published by Irem for arcades. Originally released only in Japan, it consists of a mix of top-down shooter and vertically scrolling shooter gameplay. It was released outside Japan for the first time by Hamster Corporation as part of their Arcade Archives series for the Nintendo Switch and PlayStation 4 in 2018, under the name Heroic Episode, with support for vertical screen gameplay on the Nintendo Switch.

== Gameplay ==
In Yōjūden, players control a winged soldier in the fantasy land of Mule, which is under invasion by the Gule Empire; he travels through land and sea to retrieve a statue of their goddess from the Gule Empire. In the land segments, the soldier travels on foot while shooting enemy soldiers in a manner similar to Capcom's Commando, while the air segments has the soldier fly and shoot monsters emerging from under the ocean. The soldier is armed with a maser that can shoot standard projectiles and a stronger version with slower rate of fire.

== Reception ==
Reviewing the Arcade Archives release on the Nintendo Switch, Dave Frear of Nintendo Life praised the mix of gameplay but criticized its harsh difficulty and lack of originality.
