= Blade Master =

1991 video game

- Japanese arcade flyer
- Developer: Irem
- Publisher: Irem
- Platform: Arcade
- Release: JP: July 1991; NA: September 1991
- Genres: Hack and slash, beat 'em up
- Modes: Single-player, multiplayer
- Arcade system: Irem M-92

Blade Master is a 1991 hack and slash video game developed and published by Irem for arcades. Two selectable heroes, Roy and Arnold, try to save their land from hordes of monsters. There are items to break and power-ups to collect, typical of this genre in the 1990s.

== Gameplay ==
Gameplay screenshot

== Reception ==
Reception

Review scores
Publication	Score
Game Zone	4/5
Sinclair User	82%
Zero	3.5/5

In Japan, Game Machine listed Blade Master as the fifteenth most successful table arcade unit of August 1991, outperforming titles such as Vimana and King of the Monsters. British gaming magazine The One for Amiga Games reviewed Blade Master in August 1991, calling it a "masterpiece" and stating that "Irem has certainly pulled out all the stops here - beautifully crafted animated sprites, lovely backgrounds, excellent gameplay, sampled sound", and furthermore calls the combat "satisfying". In the October 1991 issue of Japanese publication Micom BASIC Magazine, the game was ranked on the number fourteen spot in terms of popularity.
