= Steambot Chronicles =

2005 video game

- North American box art
- Developer: Irem
- Publishers: JP: Irem; NA: Atlus; PAL: 505 Games
- Producer: Kazuma Kujo
- Series: Steambot Chronicles
- Platform: PlayStation 2
- Release: JP: June 30, 2005; NA: May 23, 2006; EU: October 13, 2006; AU: October 19, 2006
- Genre: Action role-playing
- Modes: Single-player, multiplayer

Steambot Chronicles (Note: Japanese: ポンコツ浪漫大活劇バンピートロット, Hepburn: Ponkotsu Roman Daikatsugeki: Bumpy Trot) is a 2005 action role-playing game developed and published by Irem Software Engineering in Japan for the PlayStation 2, set during an alternate universe Industrial Revolution where machines called 'Trotmobiles' became the standard for modern transportation and industrial machinery. It was later published by Atlus in North America and 505 Games in PAL regions.

The game features sandbox style gameplay and several distinct sub-systems for the player to interact with, including multiple rhythm games, mech customisation and combat, and a player-reactive economy.

A sequel, Bumpy Trot 2, was announced and shown at the 2006 Tokyo Game Show, though it was officially cancelled in 2011. Two spin-off titles were also released: Steambot Chronicles: Battle Tournament for the PlayStation Portable and Blocks Club with Bumpy Trot, originally released for the PlayStation 2 and later ported to the PlayStation Portable.

== Plot ==
The game begins with a personality quiz, answers to these questions affecting the personality of the player character and how others will react towards him. Afterwards, the player character, revealed to be a young male named Vanilla, awakes on the shore of Seagull Beach, with a seemingly cheerful girl named Coriander (Connie for short) beside him, and currently suffers from amnesia due to a shipwreck nearby that occurred before the events of the game. Vanilla learns that Connie is picking herbs to use as medicine for her bed-ridden mother, Rosemary, who lives in Nefroburg. Vanilla spots a vehicle on a nearby cliff that shoots a bazooka, trapping the two in Seagull Beach.

Connie must get home to Nefroburg on the last bus, but cannot because of the fallen boulder blocking her path. She and Vanilla go to a nearby cottage that, as it turns out, holds bad memories for Connie, evidence of this being her in a picture with two unknown figures. The two stumble upon an old run-down Trotmobile resembling a bipedal automobile, which they use to leave Seagull Beach. Connie discovers that the bus already left minutes ago, and requests that Vanilla take her to Nefroburg.

On the trip, the two encounter a hoodlum from a gang known as the "Killer Elephants", who challenges Vanilla to a duel. After defeating the hoodlum, the two encounter Marjoram, one of the members of the Garland Globetrotters (a band of which Connie is the lead singer). Vanilla will have to help find Basil, another member of the band, and take him back to Marjoram and Connie.

The four later head back to Nefroburg. On the way, they encounter a humongous quadruped mechanical fortress (operated by the "Killer Elephants"), which Vanilla must destroy before the trip can continue. Once at Nefroburg, the four encounter yet another member, Fennel (who is suspected of firing the bazooka at Connie and Vanilla on the beach). After attending a concert at night, the player may choose to change the plot and Vanilla himself.

== Characters ==
- Vanilla R. Beans (voiced by Spike Spencer in English) is the protagonist and player character of the game. He awakes on a plank of wood in Seagull Beach with a shipwreck found nearby, having suffered from amnesia after the accident. After attending a concert in Nefroburg, the player may choose to make Vanilla a hero or a villain.
- Coriander is the lead vocalist of the Garland Globetrotters. She and Vanilla first meet on Seagull Beach while she was collecting herbs for her sick bed-ridden mother. She seems like a typical cheerful girl, but this belies a sadness from a past tragedy.
- Marjoram is drummer and saxophonist for the Globetrotters. Marjoram is a dedicated hard-working man, also taking care of the band's paperwork and finances. His family owns a grocery store in Happy Garland.
- Savory is the backup vocalist and pianist for the Globetrotters. Savory is like a big sister to Coriander and is extremely popular with the band's male fans.
- Basil is the bass string for the Globetrotters. He is short and immature, but has a knack for cheering people up.
- Fennel is an original member of Globetrotters who played guitar before leaving the band to pursue his musical dreams. Even after he leaves the band, he remains concerned about the other Globetrotters.
- Dandelion (voiced by Yuri Lowenthal in English) is the former leader of the Globetrotters, for which he played the violin. He is now a Master Craftsman that crafts instruments in a small shop in the woods. He lost his brother Chicory in an accident a few years back, but he seems to have moved on.
- Ciboulette is the captain of the Juniper Berry, a ship. She instructs the player in how to pilot a Trotmobile in the game's tutorial.
- Rosemary is Coriander's bed-ridden mother, a sweet gentlewoman. She asks the player to be a good friend to Coriander as she is aware of her daughter's inner turmoil. She was the former leader of the Globetrotters a long time ago, and even taught Dandelion how to play.
- Mallow is a man who Vanilla gets confused with constantly during the story. He has some kind of connection to Coriander and the others, a very dark one. He is the son of a wealthy man that owns the hospital in Happy Garland. When he was young, he used to tease Dandelion and Chicory because they were poor. The player assumes the role of him during the tutorial mode, which also acts as a semi-prelude to the actual game.

== Gameplay ==
=== Trotmobiles ===
The mechs, or "Trotmobiles" as they are called in the game (Trot Vehicles in the Japanese version), encompass most of the gameplay. They are introduced before the player gets to the first town, and function for transportation, trading commodities, and battles. They can be modified with dozens of parts, which can be purchased, found, or crafted. They range from small and speedy but frail, to large, powerful, and sturdy, but slow, but some are perfect in all aspects (Light and Strong and Fast), such as Schneider's and Elder's Trotmobiles, who are the top two ranked gladiators in the game. It is left for players to decide how they will customize their own Trotmobiles.

=== Music ===
Music plays a major role in Steambot Chronicles' plot. Vanilla is at first a solo musician on the street, until he is invited to join the Garland Globetrotters. With each successful concert, Vanilla earns tips and posters of the other Globetrotters, as well as sheet music for new songs. The sheet music allows Vanilla to practice songs solo. If he plays well enough, he will be asked to manage the band.

There are several instruments in the game, each with different control schemes. Vanilla starts out with a harmonica, and can later acquire the trumpet, saxophone, violin, string bass, accordion, drums, and guitar as well as play church organs and pianos found in bars or colleges. The main reward for playing music is tips.

There are six vocal songs, four that Coriander performs during the main story, and two which can be unlocked through sidequests. Nadia Gifford wrote and performed five of the songs for Coriander:

- 1. In Your Voice
- 2. Impossible
- 3. I Cry
- 4. Just Shout It Out
- 5. See You Later

The last song in the game is sung by Ryan Kerwin as Fennel:

- 6. Music Revolution

In an optional side-quest, Vanilla can acquire an electric guitar and join Fennel's "Fennel and the Blue Lightning" band.

== Reception ==
Reception

Aggregate score
Aggregator	Score
Metacritic	74/100

Review scores
Publication	Score
Edge	7/10
Eurogamer	7/10
Famitsu	32/40
Game Informer	5.5/10
GamePro	3/5
GameRevolution	B
GameSpot	7.1/10
GameSpy	4.5/5
GameTrailers	7/10
GameZone	7.1/10
IGN	7.3/10
Official U.S. PlayStation Magazine	4.5/5
The A.V. Club	A−

The game received "average" reviews according to video game review aggregator Metacritic. In Japan, Famitsu gave it a score of one nine, one eight, one seven, and one eight, for a total of 32 out of 40.

Hyper commended the game for its "huge amount of freedom [and] clever musical rhythm games" but criticised it for its "slowdown [and] load times".

== Cancelled sequel ==
A sequel to Steambot Chronicles, known as Poncotsu Roman Daikatsugeki Bumpy Trot 2 (ポンコツ浪漫大活劇バンピートロット2, Ponkotsu Rouman Dai Katsugeki Bampītorotto Tsū), was officially announced in September 2006, at the Tokyo Game Show. The game was in development by Irem, but was cancelled along with several other games following the 2011 Tōhoku earthquake and tsunami.

Initially the game was designed for the PlayStation 2, with the first trailer showing the new protagonist and a female companion exploring a wintery forest in a Trotmobile before being confronted by larger Trotmobiles, followed by a montage of gameplay elements ranging from downhill combat, fire fighting, loading and unloading ships, and performing in a band. An issue of Famitsu revealed details that the title moved production to the PlayStation 3 and that Irem would unveil a new trailer at the 2007 Tokyo Game Show. The new trailer showed off the game's graphics (while retaining the cel-shaded style of the original), and showcasing more of the action-oriented scenes than the first trailer.
