= Moon Patrol =

1982 video game

- North American arcade flyer
- Developer: Irem
- Publishers: Arcade: JP: Irem; NA: Williams Electronics; Ports; Atari, Inc. Atarisoft
- Designer: Takashi Nishiyama
- Platforms: Arcade, Apple II, Atari 8-bit, Atari 2600, Atari 5200, Atari ST, Commodore 64, IBM PC, MSX, TI-99/4A, VIC-20
- Release: JP: June 1982; NA: August 1982; EU: 1982
- Genre: Scrolling shooter
- Modes: Single-player, multiplayer
- Arcade system: Irem M-52 hardware

Moon Patrol (Note: Japanese: ムーンパトロール, Hepburn: Mūn Patorōru) is a 1982 horizontally scrolling shooter video game developed and published by Irem for arcades. It was released by Williams Electronics in North America. The player controls a lunar rover which continually drives forward across a scrolling landscape while jumping over or shooting obstacles such as holes and rocks. Shooting sends one bullet forward along the buggy's path and, simultaneously, another straight up for defense against aerial attack saucers. The goal is to reach the next checkpoint and eventually the end of the course.

Designed by Takashi Nishiyama, Moon Patrol is often credited with the introduction of full parallax scrolling in side-scrolling games. Cabinet art for the Williams version was done by Larry Day. Most of the home ports were from Atari, Inc., sometimes under the Atarisoft label.

== Gameplay ==
Two UFOs attack the moon buggy from above.

As a Luna City police officer assigned to Sector Nine, the home of the "toughest thugs in the galaxy", the player controls a lunar rover that travels to the right over the horizontally scrolling surface of the Moon. Craters, mines, and other obstacles on the ground must be shot or jumped over. Three types of flying UFOs attack from above and must be shot down. One of the flying enemies has a weapon which creates a crater when it hits the ground.

Gameplay takes place on two courses, each divided into 26 checkpoints identified with letters of the English alphabet. Of these, the five major checkpoints—E, J, O, T and, Z—denote a new "stage" with a new background and theme; for example, the third stage starts at J and introduces mines. The top portion of the screen shows a timeline-style map of the course, with the major checkpoints marked. Above the map is an indicator of the current checkpoint, the time spent in the stage, and three indicator lights: the top light indicates upcoming enemy aerial attacks, the middle one indicates an upcoming minefield, and the bottom one indicates enemies approaching from behind.

At the end of a stage, that time spent is compared to the average, and bonus points are awarded accordingly, at 1,000 plus 100 per second bettered; completing an entire course gives an additional 5,000 points plus 100 per second bettered. There are two unique courses: the "Beginner Course" and the "Champion Course". Once the first two Champion Courses are successfully finished, the next one & hereafter "loops" forever on.

Extra lives are given at 10,000, 30,000, and 50,000 points; thereafter, no more lives are given. The game ends when the last patrol car is destroyed. The game can be continued, but points scored from one game do not carry over.

== Development ==
Moon Patrol runs on the Irem M52 8-bit arcade system board manufactured by Irem and was written in assembly language. The M52 system includes:

- Z80 @ 3.072 MHz as main CPU
- M6803 @ 894.886 kHz as sound CPU
- 2 x General Instrument AY-3-8910A @ 894.886 KHz, 2 x OKI MSM5205 @ 384 KHz, Discrete Analogic Circuit for explosion sound effect

Other games that uses M52 board are 10-Yard Fight, Traverse USA / Zippy Race / Motorace USA, and Tropical Angel.

== Ports ==
Atari, Inc. released Moon Patrol for the Apple II, Atari 8-bit computers, Atari 2600, Atari 5200, Atari ST, Commodore 64, VIC-20, IBM PC (as a self-booting disk), and TI-99/4A. The versions for non-Atari systems were published under the Atarisoft label. The MSX conversion was published by Irem.

== Reception ==
Moon Patrol was among the five top-grossing arcade games on North America's monthly RePlay charts by January 1983.

Moon Patrol received a Certificate of Merit in the category of "1984 Best Science Fiction/ Fantasy Video Game" at the 5th annual Arkie Awards. Arcade Express reviewed the arcade version in January 1983 and scored it 8 out of 10.

Scott Mace of InfoWorld stated that Moon Patrol for the Commodore 64 was his favorite Atarisoft game, making good use of the computer's sound. Computer Games magazine called the Commodore 64 conversion a "very good" shoot 'em up and the "thinking man's killing game" while noting it has a continue feature like Vanguard. They later gave the home computer conversions a B− rating. In March 1985, Computer & Video Games rated the Atari 8-bit computer version 33 out of 40 and listed it as the third best game of the month. In 1995, Flux magazine ranked the arcade version 86th on their "Top 100 Video Games" list.

== Legacy ==
Moon Patrol introduced full parallax scrolling. The arcade video game Jump Bug (1981) previously used a limited form of parallax scrolling, with the main scene scrolling while the starry night sky is fixed and clouds move slowly. Moon Patrol has three separate background layers scrolling at different speeds, simulating the distance between them. Taito's Jungle King, also with parallax scrolling, was released a month after Moon Patrol.

The game's designer Takashi Nishiyama went on to create the beat 'em up game Kung-Fu Master (1984).

=== Re-releases ===
Moon Patrol was included in the retro compilations Arcade Hits: Moon Patrol & Spy Hunter for Game Boy Color and Midway Presents Arcade's Greatest Hits: The Midway Collection 2 for Dreamcast, PlayStation, and Microsoft Windows. In 2006 Bandai released an enhanced version as Moon Patrol EX for cell phones. Hamster Corporation released the game as part of the Arcade Archives series for the Nintendo Switch and PlayStation 4 in 2018. The original arcade version is also included on the Irem cartridge for the Evercade series of consoles.

=== Clones ===
A bootleg version called Moon Ranger was released in the arcades the same year as Moon Patrol.

Home clones include Desert Patrol for the TRS-80 Color Computer (1983), Gas Hog for the Atari 2600 (1983), Lunar Rover Patrol for the Dragon 32 (1983), Moon Buggy for the Commodore 64 (1983), Moon Alert for the ZX Spectrum (1984), Luna Rover for the ZX Spectrum (1985), Moon Control for the Amstrad CPC (1985), Moonrider for MSX (1986), and Overlander for the Amiga (1993). Battle Through Time (1984) for the Commodore 64 re-themed the gameplay to be about major wars of the 20th century. A contemporaneous review for B.C.'s Quest for Tires (1983) remarked on the game's similarity to Moon Patrol.

Open-source clones named moon-buggy and ASCII Patrol run in Unix-like terminals.
