= In the Hunt =

1993 video game

- Arcade flyer
- Developer: Irem (Note: PlayStation version developed by Xing Entertainment; Saturn version developed by SIMS.)
- Publishers: Irem: PlayStation; JP: Xing Entertainment; NA/EU: Kokopeli Digital Studios Saturn; JP: Imagineer; NA/EU: Kokopeli Digital Studios Windows Xing Entertainment
- Designer: Kazuma Kujo
- Artist: Akio Oyabu
- Platforms: Arcade, PlayStation, Sega Saturn, Windows
- Release: April 1993: Arcade; WW: April 1993 PlayStation; JP: November 10, 1995; NA: March 22, 1996; EU: 1996 Saturn; JP: December 15, 1995; NA: June 4, 1996; EU: June 1996 Windows; JP: 1997
- Genre: Scrolling shooter
- Modes: Single-player, multiplayer
- Arcade system: Irem M-92

In the Hunt (Note: Known in Japan as Undersea War (Japanese: 海底大戦争, Hepburn: Kaitei Daisensō)) is a 1993 scrolling shooter video game developed and published by Irem for arcades. Versions for the PlayStation, Sega Saturn, and Microsoft Windows were also released. The player assumes control of the Granvia, a submarine tasked with overthrowing the Dark Anarchy Society before they activate their doomsday device. Gameplay involves shooting enemies, collecting power-up items, and avoiding collision with projectiles. It runs on the Irem M-92 hardware.

The game was conceived by Kazuma Kujo, and designed by the same group of people that later went on to found Nazca Corporation, the creators of the Metal Slug series. Kujo was inspired to create a water-based shooter, with player-dependent scrolling and simultaneous multiplayer being its main focus. The overall concept of submarine warfare was inspired by Kujo's leisure with a water fountain. In the Hunt was met with mixed reception from critics since its initial release, specifically the home conversions; common complaints were towards the lack of innovation and slowdown, although it was praised for its detailed graphics and gameplay. Nevertheless, it has since gained a cult following in Japan.

== Gameplay ==
The Granvia fighting Argock, the game's first boss (arcade version).

In the Hunt is an underwater-themed scrolling shooter, with its gameplay described as a cross between Metal Slug (1996) and R-Type (1987). The plot involves an evil organization named the D.A.S. ("Destroy and Slaughter" in Japanese; "Dark Anarchy Society" overseas) attempting to launch a superweapon over a post-apocalyptic earth. To stop this, a submarine named the Granvia is deployed to stop the D.A.S. and protect what is left of the planet. The game does not scroll automatically, as the player is able to move the Granvia at their own will. In each level, the objective is to destroy enemies, avoid their projectiles, and defeat the end level boss. The Granvia begins the game with forward-moving missiles, which defeat most enemies with one hit. Missiles can be launched upwards to destroy aerial enemies like helicopters and planes. Destroying specific enemy types rewards the player with a power-up, which give the Granvia access to new weapon types. Weapons include a powerful machine gun, a wave cannon, and a "cracker" shot that launches a barrage of bullets at enemies. Some enemies drop red orbs embossed with stars, which award bonus points when collected. The game has multiple endings.

== Development and release ==
In the Hunt was designed by a group of Irem employees that would later go on to found Nazca Corporation, the creators of the Metal Slug series. Kazuma Kujo served as its designer, writing the concept and overseeing development of the project during his time working at Irem. Kujo stated that plans for a shoot 'em up title had already been settled by the management at Irem, however he decided to make it for co-op play but disliked genre conventions such as forced scrolling and wanted the thematic to be different instead of the standard space motive found in other shooters at the time. The concept of playing as submarines was inspired during Kujo's leisure near a fountain which, after hearing the water sounds, prompted him to pursue the idea. Artist Akio Oyabu served as the game's graphic designer.

In the Hunt was first released in arcades in April 1993, running on the Irem M-92 board. The game was ported to the Sega Saturn and PlayStation in 1995 by Tsuji Jimusho and SIMS respectively, followed by a Microsoft Windows version in 1997 by Xing Entertainment. They were released internationally by THQ under their Kokopeli Digital Studios label. A Super Nintendo Entertainment System conversion was shown at the 1994 Consumer Electronics Show in a playable state, but was never released. In 2019, Hamster Corporation released the game under their Arcade Archives series for the Nintendo Switch and PlayStation 4.

== Reception ==
Reception

Aggregate score
Aggregator	Score
GameRankings	52.33%

Review scores
Publication	Score
AllGame	2/5
Edge	4/10
Electronic Gaming Monthly	8.25/10
Famitsu	26/40
GameFan	212/300
IGN	3/10
Next Generation	1/5
Nintendo Life	8/10
Gamest	28/50
Maximum	2/5
Sega Saturn Magazine	76%

In Japan, Game Machine listed In the Hunt as the sixth most popular arcade game of May 1993. Play Meter listed it as the 16th most popular arcade game at the time. RePlay also reported it to be the fifth most popular arcade game at the time.

Electronic Gaming Monthly gave the PlayStation version a positive review, with their four reviewers particularly praising the huge number of enemies on-screen for the bulk of the game and the minimal slowdown. GamePro were also positive in their assessment: "The very detailed graphics are supported by audio that's loaded with blasts. The controls are sluggish but mostly accurate. This sub floats above other PlayStation shooters like Galactic Attack [sic - Galactic Attack was released for the Saturn, not the PlayStation] and Jupiter Strike." Maximum expressed enthusiasm for "little innovations" like the mine powerups and the King Canute boss, but nonetheless concluded the game to be "an all-too familiar mission." They also criticized that the game is too easy, short, and lacking in replay value, all criticisms that were shared by one of EGM's reviewers. A reviewer for Next Generation actually praised the game for having some mild slowdown, saying that it reflects the phenomenally high level of action going on. However, he generally panned the game for the slow movement of the player's submarine, and concluded that "while very young gamers might enjoy the lightshow, the lethargic tempo and lack of originality are sure to put anyone over the age of 10 to sleep."

Sega Saturn Magazine described the game as unoriginal and outdated, but enjoyable, with a strong sense of tongue-in-cheek humor and ingeniously designed boss fights. They concluded, "Nothing particularly new or exciting here, but In the Hunt is good fun to play, featuring loads of exciting battles and explosions." Scary Larry of GamePro found the Saturn version does not hold up well to either the PlayStation version or recent Saturn shooters such as Panzer Dragoon II and Darius Gaiden, particularly due to its frequent slowdown. He nonetheless concluded it to be "a great rental" and "a good buy if you're feeling nostalgic."
