= Eizo =

Japanese visual technology company

Eizo Corporation
- Native name: EIZO株式会社
- Formerly: Eizo Nanao Corporation
- Type: Public KK
- Traded as: TYO: 6737
- Industry: Computer
- Founded: March 1968; 58 years ago in Hakui, Ishikawa, Japan (as Hakui Electronic Corporation)
- Headquarters: 153 Shimokashiwano, Hakusan, Ishikawa 924-8566, Japan
- Key people: Yoshitaka Jitsumori (President and CEO)
- Products: Computer monitors; Medical monitors; Color management monitors; Industrial monitors; Imaging system software
- Brands: ColorEdge, CuratOR, DuraVision, FlexScan, FORIS, RadiForce, Raptor
- Revenue: ▲US$ 696.1 million (FY 2021) (¥ 76.57 billion) (FY 2021)
- Net income: ▲US$ 56.0 million (FY 2021 (¥ 6.15 billion) (FY 2021)
- Number of employees: 2,422 (consolidated, as of March 31, 2020)
- Subsidiaries: Carina System Co., Ltd. EIZO Support Network Corporation EIZO MS Corporation EIZO Engineering Corporation EIZO Agency Corporation EIZO GmbH EIZO Technologies GmbH EIZO Display Technologies (Suzhou) Co., Ltd. EIZO Inc. EIZO Nordic AB EIZO AG EIZO Limited EIZO Europe GmbH EIZO Austria GmbH Irem Software Engineering Inc. Nanao Factory
- Website: www.eizoglobal.com

Eizo Corporation (EIZO株式会社, EIZO Kabushiki-gaisha; /ˈeɪzoʊ/) is a Japanese visual technology company, founded in March 1968, which manufactures display products and other solutions for markets such as business, healthcare, graphics, air traffic control, and maritime. The company is headquartered in Hakusan, Ishikawa Prefecture.

== Name ==
The name EIZO comes from the Japanese word meaning "image" (映像 eizō).

== History ==
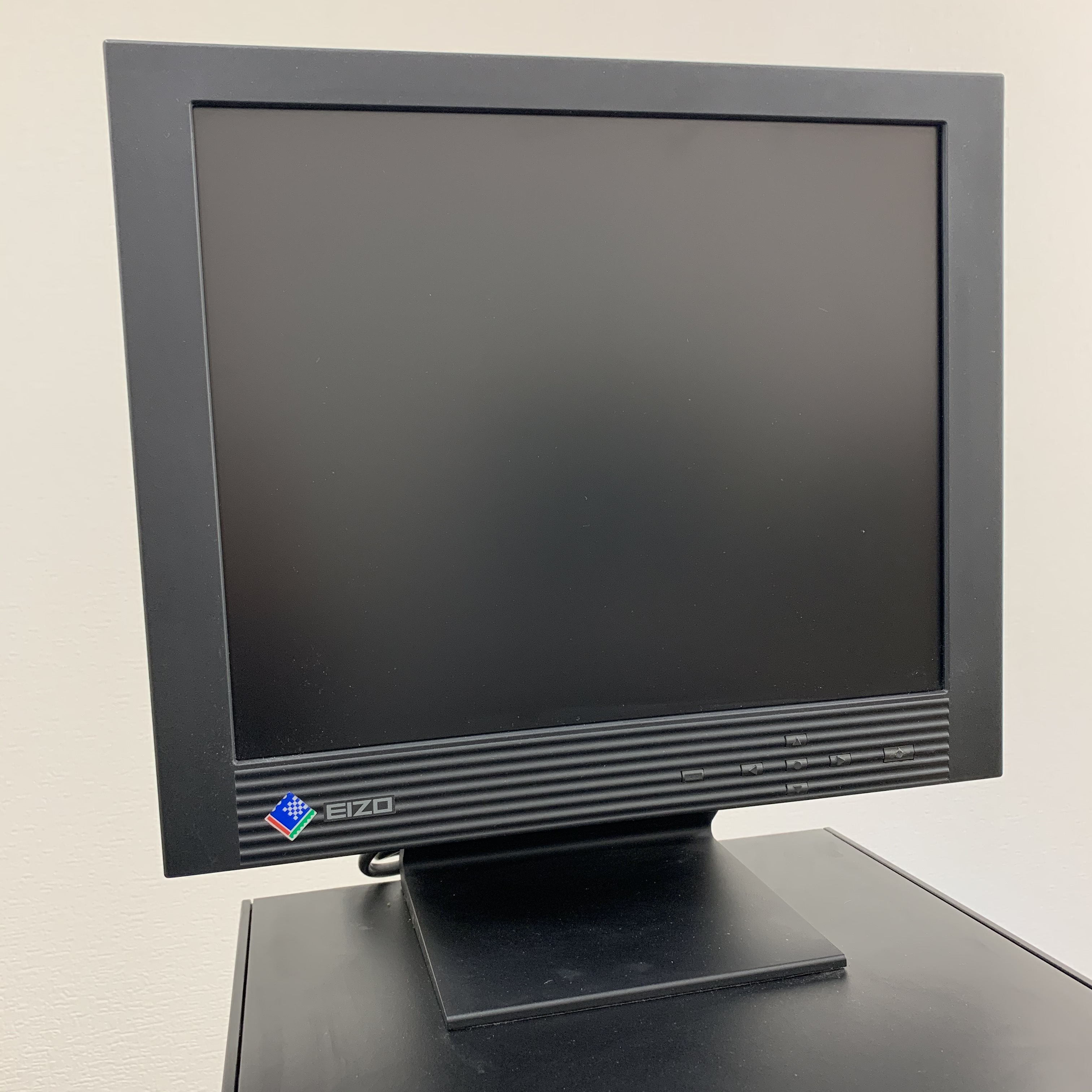
EIZO FlexScan L461 (16.0 inch)

Nanao Electric Co., Ltd. was founded in Nanao, Ishikawa in 1967. The following year, Hakui Electronic Corporation was founded in Hakui, Ishikawa; it initially manufactured televisions. In March 1973, it became Nanao Corporation.

In 1976, the company began to manufacture industrial monitors, and in 1978 it entered the gaming market by manufacturing CRTs arcade game cabinets of Space Invaders and selling tabletop video arcade machines.

In 1980, the company acquired video game developer and publisher Irem Corporation. Nanao had two other video developers: Tamtex and an internal arcade game development division. In 1981, production of computer monitors, video cassette recorders and radio cassette TVs, with a new factory opening in Hakusan.

In 1984 the company began expanding overseas, distributing in Europe under the brand EIZO, with Hitec Associates Ltd established as a sales subsidiary specifically for the European market, and Nanao USA in California, United States, to launch products in that region under the same "Nanao" brand as in Japan. "EIZO" was launched as a brand of Hitec Associates in Europe in 1985, with the European arm was renamed as the Eizo Corporation in January 1990.

In 1990, the company's headquarters moved to Mattō, Ishikawa, with production and sales of computer monitors under the brand NANAO beginning the following year. In 1996, the brand was unified under the name EIZO.

In 1997, Irem Software Engineering Inc. was established, as a subsidiary company replacing Irem Corporation. The following couple of years saw the introduction of the FlexScan L23 13.8 LCD monitor and the FlexScan L66, the world’s first 1280x1024 resolution monitor. In 1999, Nanao Corporation and Eizo Corporation merged to become Eizo Nanao Corporation.

Production of monitors for medical imaging began in 2002, under the brand name RadiForce. In 2004 the company began production of the ColorEdge CG220, the world's first monitor capable of reproducing the Adobe RGB colorspace. In 2005 Eizo Nanao received ISO 13485 certification as the first manufacturer of stand-alone monitors.

In 2013, Eizo Nanao Corporation changed its name to Eizo Corporation. Further acquisitions included Panasonic Healthcare Co. Ltd's endoscopy monitor business (2016) and Carina System Co.Ltd. (2018), a company that develops camera hardware and software for the healthcare and broadcasting markets.

In April 2023, EIZO Corporation announced the launch of its new subsidiary, EIZO Private Limited, in India.

== Products ==
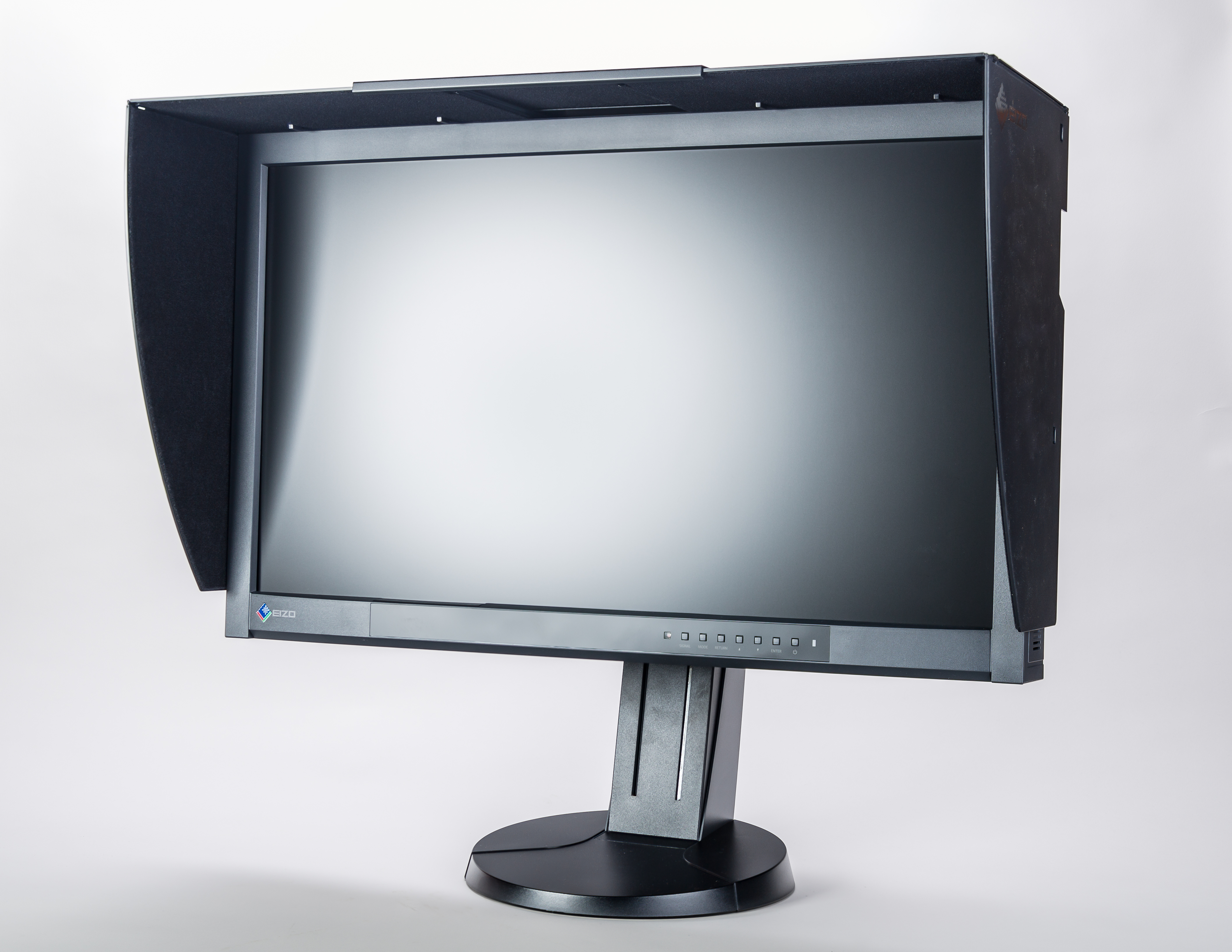
EIZO ColorEdge CG277 display

- FlexScan - Business LCD Monitors
- ColorEdge - Color Management Monitors
- DuraVision - Touch panel, IP Decoders and Industrial monitors
- RadiForce - Medical display systems (calibration: RadiCS software; RadiNET Pro for management)
- CuratOR - OR Area camera and display systems
- FORIS - Home entertainment monitors
- Raptor - Air traffic control monitors
