= Irem =

Japanese video game and pachinko company

- Native name: アイレムソフトウェアエンジニアリング株式会社
- Romanized name: Airemu Sofutowea Enjiniaringu Kabushiki-gaisha
- Company type: Subsidiary
- Industry: Video games, pachinko
- Founded: July 10, 1974 (Irem Corporation); April 15, 1997 (Irem Software Engineering)
- Headquarters: Chiyoda, Tokyo, Japan
- Key people: Kenzo Tsujimoto (Founder); Masaki Ono (President)
- Products: Video games Pachinko
- Number of employees: 200
- Parent: Eizo
- Website: www.irem.co.jp

Irem Software Engineering, Inc. (Note: Japanese: アイレムソフトウェアエンジニアリング株式会社, Hepburn: Airemu Sofutowea Enjiniaringu Kabushiki-gaisha) is a Japanese video game developer and publisher and manufacturer of pachinkos. The company has its headquarters in Chiyoda, Tokyo.

The full name of the company that uses the brand is Irem Software Engineering. It was established in 1997 by its parent company Nanao (now Eizo) for the purpose of taking over the development department of the original Irem Corporation, that had left the video game industry in 1994 to concentrate itself on the rental and sales of coin-op electronics. Irem Corporation was founded in 1974 as IPM and still exists today under the name of Apies.

Irem is known internationally for three 1980s arcade games: Moon Patrol (1982; licensed to Williams Electronics in North America), the earliest beat 'em up, Kung-Fu Master (1984), and the scrolling shooter R-Type (1987). Irem has been popular in Japan with games like Gekibo: Gekisha Boy for the PC Engine and In the Hunt and Undercover Cops for arcades.

Since the 2010s, Irem has largely abandoned the development of console video games in favor of games based on pachinko machines.

== History ==
Older logo (1979—2001)

Irem's ancestor was founded in 1969 by Kenzo Tsujimoto in Osaka Prefecture. Tsujimoto opened his store in Osaka to sell machines for cotton candy stores. At the time, Tsujimoto was already confident in the potential of the game entertainment and started including the manufacturing of pachinko machines to his business as early as 1970.

The success of the store led to the creation in 1974 of IPM Co Ltd, with Tsujimoto as its president. "IPM" stood for International Playing Machine. At first, IPM's purpose was to build and install video game machines for small stores in Japan, and its initial vocation was not much different from Tsujimoto's previous venture.

With Breakout and its various clones dominating the video game scene, IPM started to manufacture, sell, and rent arcade hardware cabinets. In 1977, IPM partnered with Nanao Corporation of Ishikawa Prefecture to produce CRT monitors for its arcade cabinets.

IPM released its first video arcade games in 1978, starting with IPM Invader (a clone of Taito's legendary Space Invaders). In early 1979, IPM changed its name to Irem Corporation following a letter from IBM that the name "IPM" was too confusing. Irem is an acronym for "International Rental Electronics Machines".

In 1980, Nanao became the majority shareholder of Irem Corporation.

Tsujimoto remained chairman of Irem Corporation in the early 1980s despite establishing in 1979 another company, I.R.M Corporation (the precursor of Capcom). However, Tsujimoto was blamed in 1982 for the declining sales of the video game IPM Invader and other lackluster titles, and was replaced by Nanao's president. The following year, Tsujimoto left the company to form Capcom.

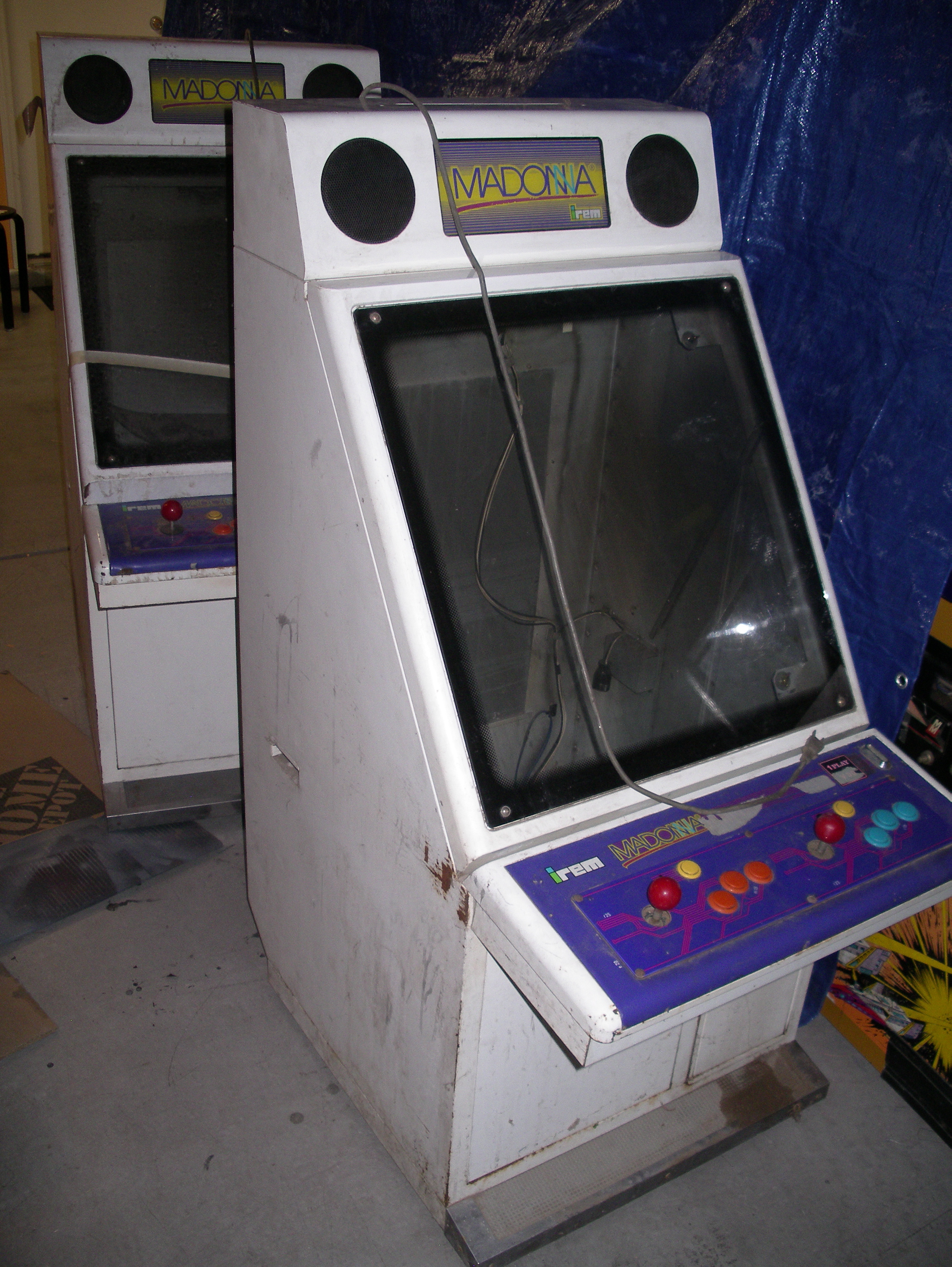
An Irem cab

Three arcade games released by Irem in the 1980s became the company's most successful titles: Moon Patrol (1982; licensed to Williams Electronics in North America), the earliest beat 'em up, Kung-Fu Master (1984), and the scrolling shooter R-Type (1987). While Irem's arcade video games in the 1980s were typically developed in-house, its published titles on the Famicom home console were often handled by Tamtex, a Tokyo-based sister company from the Nanao Group.

In 1994, Irem completely ceased development of video games. The development department of Irem Corporation was transferred to Nanao's headquarters in Ishikawa Prefecture. The company's original wholesale division, in charge of manufacturing and renting/selling arcade cabinets, stayed in Osaka and was not impacted by the company's restructuring. Then, a group of employees from Irem's video game division, left to form their own company under the name Nazca Corporation, which became best known for developing SNK's Metal Slug franchise.

In late 1996, Irem released the video game Gussun Paradise (ぐっすんぱらだいす) for the PlayStation. Although this was the company's first video game in two years, this would also be the last video game from Irem Corporation.

On April 15, 1997, Nanao established Irem Software Engineering Inc. Shortly after in July 1997, Irem Software Engineering took over the development department of Irem Corporation and absorbed it.

With the video game business gone to the new Irem Software Engineering, Irem Corporation was left with only its longtime arcade equipment division. In 1997, Nanao sold Irem Corporation to Yubis Corporation. In 1998, Irem Corporation was renamed Apies Corporation Ltd to avoid confusing the company with Irem Software Engineering. Ownership of Apies changed hands in April 1999, when Yubis sold the company to Atlus. Atlus finally sold its shares of Apies in 2001 for 1 000 yen. Apies has been an independent company since then. With the decline of amusement equipment, Apies leading products are fortune-telling machines and senjafuda vending machines. In 2018, it was the top manufacturer of fortune-telling vending machines in Japan, controlling approximately 80% of the domestic market. Apies is now located in Wakō and is the original company founded in 1974 by Kenzo Tsujimoto.

Following its inception in 1997, Irem Software Engineering developed and published, under the Irem trademark, video games in Japan mainly for the various PlayStation and Nintendo platforms. Irem Software Engineering owns the rights to the video games that were produced by Irem Corporation and continued releasing new installments of the R-Type franchise. As a result of the 2011 Tōhoku earthquake and tsunami, Irem canceled the majority of its remaining video game projects, including Disaster Report 4 Plus: Summer Memories (its production resumed in 2014 under another publisher) and a sequel to Steambot Chronicles. Irem refocused to become primarily a slot-machine and pachinko developer, the industry it was in before turning to video games. Many Irem designers, including producer Kazuma Kujo, gathered to form a new company called Granzella to continue creating video games. Though no longer involved in the development or release of new video games, Irem remains present in the industry as a licensor of its IPs to other companies, such as when it sold to Hamster Corporation in 2017 the rights to produce some of its arcade games. The company had long been based in Hakusan but moved in 2010 to Chiyoda, Tokyo. It is a wholly owned subsidiary of Eizo Corporation (formerly Nanao).

== See also ==
- List of Irem games
