= Type R (disambiguation) =

The Type R is a marque of special performance Honda cars.

Type R or R Type may also refer to:

== Transportation ==
=== Automotive ===
- Audi Type R, a 1930s car
- Bentley R Type, a 1950s car
- MG R-type, a 1930s car
- Renault R-Type engine, a 2010s straight-4 diesel

=== Other ===
- VicRail R type carriage, Australian rail carriage
- Lohner Type R, a WWI flying boat from Austria-Hungary
- Type R ship, a WWII U.S. Navy ship classification for refrigerated cargo ships

== Science ==
- R-type asteroid, a type of main-belt asteroid
- R-type calcium channel (cellular biology)

== Video gaming ==
- R-Type, a video game series:
  - R-Type, 1987
  - R-Type II, 1989
  - Super R-Type, 1991
  - R-Type Leo, 1992
  - R-Type III: The Third Lightning, 1993
  - R-Type Delta, 1999
  - R-Type Final, 2003
  - R-Type Tactics, 2007
  - R-Type Tactics II: Operation Bitter Chocolate, 2009

== Other ==
- R-type instruction format for machine code, see MIPS architecture
- Type R print, reverse chromogenic print process
- R-Type (album series), by Health (2026)

== See also ==
- R (disambiguation)
- R class (disambiguation)
- Model R (disambiguation)
- Honda R engine, a 2000s inline-four engine
- Mack R series, a Class 8 heavy-duty truck
- International Harvester R-Series, 1950s truck
