= R-Types =

1998 shoot'em up video game compilation

- Developer: Irem
- Publishers: JP: Irem; NA: ASCII; EU: Virgin Interactive
- Series: R-Type
- Platform: PlayStation
- Release: JP: February 5, 1998; EU: October 1998; NA: March 1999
- Genre: Various
- Mode: Single-player

R-Types (Note: Japanese: アール タイプス, Hepburn: Āru Taipusu) is a 1998 shoot'em up video game compilation developed and published by Irem for the PlayStation. It was published by ASCII Corporation in North America, and by Virgin Interactive in Europe. R-Types contains two games from Irem's R-Type franchise - the original R-Type (1987) and its direct sequel R-Type II (1989) - alongside bonus material such as promotional artwork and a gallery spanning the series' history.

Kazumi Kujo, the chief producer for the series, suggested R-Types to Irem executives whilst in talks of a potential new R-Type game. Having fallen into heavy financial difficulties and being weary of the current console game market, Irem proposed that Kujo and staff create a collection of early R-Type games as a way to test the market if a sequel was suitable. Both games were reprogrammed from scratch via reverse-engineering the original hardware, as opposed to using software emulation. R-Types allowed Irem to familiarize themselves with the hardware of the PlayStation console.

R-Types sold well, and gave Irem hope in a new R-Type game returning a profit. The game was praised by critics for its quality and extra content, although some argued that it could have benefited from additional games and that the difficulty of the two games could turn off potential players. It was re-released as a budget title in 2003, and as a digital download for the PlayStation Network in 2006.

== Gameplay ==
R-Types hosts several pieces of extra content, such as an "R Museum" containing information on the series' history.

R-Types includes conversions of the arcade games R-Type (1987) and R-Type II (1989). In both games, the player controls a starship named the R-9 that must eradicate the Bydo, a powerful extraterrestrial race bent on the destruction of mankind. Gameplay involves shooting down enemies and avoiding collision with enemies, projectiles and obstacles. The R-9 can perform a charge shot by holding down the fire button, which when released disperses a blast that cuts through enemies. Destroying small "POW Armor" enemies causes them to leave behind a power-up item, which grants the player one of several unique abilities when collected. One is the "Force", an orange-colored pod that acts as a shield for the R-9 and provides additional firepower. The Force can be attached to either the front or back of the R-9, and can also be launched forwards or backwards to fly freely. R-Type II adds a number of additional features and mechanics, including new weapon types and a new type of charge shot that creates a barrage of shots that home in on enemies.

Alongside the ports of the first two games, R-Types includes several pieces of bonus content. The "R Museum" is an extensive gallery featuring models and information ships, characters, enemies and locations spanning the history of the R-Type series up to that point, as well as a history of the series and promotional artwork. A demo for the then-upcoming R-Type Delta can be played, which ends upon completion of the second level. Two FMV cutscenes can be unlocked by getting a certain score in R-Type and R-Type II. High scores are saved to a PlayStation memory card. Controls for the Delta demo and the arcade ports can be modified to the player's liking.

== Development and release ==
By the late 1990s, Japanese video game company Irem, known for arcade hits such as R-Type and Moon Patrol, were having financial difficulties, attributed to a severe lack of major money-making hits compared to their golden years. Shortly after the release of R-Type III: The Third Lightning for the SNES, Irem closed all of its video game production lines in 1994 to focus on restructuring itself and becoming more stable.

After the company emerged as Irem Software Engineering in 1997, R-Type series chief producer Kazumi Kujo proposed a new R-Type game to executives. In an interview with Retro Gamer magazine, Kujo remembers Irem executives being very hesitant towards the idea, saying they felt the shoot’em up genre was a niche market. After several discussions, Irem proposed that Kujo and other employees create a compilation of early R-Type games as a way to test the market and see if a new sequel would be profitable. Kujo agreed, and got to work on what later became R-Types. As opposed to using software emulation like other classic game compilations, Irem reprogrammed both of the included games from scratch via reverse-engineering the original arcade boards. R-Types allowed Irem programmers to familiarize themselves with the internals of the PlayStation console, which became useful for later projects.

R-Types was completed by early 1998, and was released in Japan on February 5. As a way to create bonds with international publishers, and to rake in additional much-needed profit, Irem worked with European publisher Virgin Interactive and the American branch of the Japanese ASCII Corporation to bring R-Types overseas. Virgin released the game in Europe in October 1998, while ASCII America released it in North America in March 1999.

On October 21, 2001, Irem re-released R-Types in Japan as a budget title, published under the "R's Best" brand alongside R-Type Delta. R-Types was digitally re-released for the PlayStation Network service on December 21, 2006 in Japan, later released on April 24, 2008 in Europe and North America; due to Sony's license with Irem expiring, this version of the game was removed from the storefront.

== Reception ==
Reception

Aggregate score
Aggregator	Score
GameRankings	72.56% (12 reviews)

Review scores
Publication	Score
Computer and Video Games	4/5
Famitsu	27/40
GameSpot	6/10
IGN	6/10
Official US PlayStation Magazine	3.5/5
PSX Magazine	8/10

According to Kujo, R-Types sold well and gave Irem hope in a new R-Type sequel performing well financially in the market. Original copies have greatly risen in price over the years, and is seen as a collector's piece among R-Type fans.

The game received mostly positive reviews. Computer + Video Games said "Although we've had some great shooting games recently, R-Types still stands out as one of the very best on the PlayStation." The quality of the collection itself has been mixed, with some saying it could have benefited from additional titles. GameSpot said that Irem should have included additional games to make the price point justified, such as Super R-Type and R-Type Leo, which Famitsu agreed with. Official US PlayStation Magazine thought the game had a nice selection of bonus features, as did PSX Magazine. GameSpot said the presentation was good, but felt outside the CG movies it was rather basic.

The included games, R-Type and R-Type II, were liked by several. Many applauded the conversions for being arcade-perfect, and the best ways to play them. Official US PlayStation Magazine said their quality was the standout among the collection, saying that ports as well-done as these made it one of the best classic game collections released for the system. IGN, GameSpot and PSX Magazine all stated that the games were fun to play and had an addictive quality to them - GameSpot in particular wrote that they offered plenty of gameplay time. Most publications agreed that the game's grand difficulty could put off players. GameSpot said: "For gamers less enamored of the past, you'll definitely want to rent before you buy." CVG said that both games were just as fun as they were back in their heyday, saying it made for one of the best classic game collections released. They wrote: "While it's easy to write off classic game compilations as a waste of time and money, the good ones give you the chance to play the very best examples of video gaming excellence. R-Types is one of these."

In 2007, IGN re-reviewed R-Types for its "Retro Roundup" segment of articles, describing it as "a perfectly cool pairing of some very classic shooters". They liked the collection for its graphics, precise controls and spot-on emulation quality, saying that it makes for one of the best PSone Classic releases yet. IGN also said that both R-Type and R-Type II hold up very well, making it a great recommendation for fans of the genre.
