= List of R-Type video games =

R-Type is a science-fiction themed horizontally scrolling shooter franchise developed and published by Irem for arcade systems and home game platforms. The first entry in the series, R-Type, was released in 1987 and was followed by several sequels for other platforms. Ten games in total have been released in the series. Other pieces of media, such as plastic-resin model kits, soundtrack albums and literature, were also produced. The series centers on an intergalactic war between humans and the Bydo, a powerful extraterrestrial race that are made from both biological lifeforms and mechanical structures. Most games have the player controlling the R-9 "Arrowhead" star vessel, although other entries have slightly altered versions of the ship instead.

R-Type video games have been released for multiple home video game consoles, as well as personal computers, handheld systems and mobile phones. Several games in the series were also released for digital distribution services, such as Xbox Live Arcade, alongside dedicated compilation games for other systems. Most entries are horizontal-scrolling shooter games, although a number have expanded into other genres, such as tactical role-playing games. The R-Type series is considered one of the most important video game franchises established in the 1980s; the original is also cited as one of the greatest video games ever made.

== List of games ==
=== Main series ===
| Game | Details |
|---|---|
| R-Type Original release date(s): JP: July 1, 1987; NA: 1987 | Release years by system: 1987 – Arcade 1988 – Atari ST, Commodore 64, Master System, MSX2, PC-88, TurboGrafx-16, ZX Spectrum; 1989 – Amiga, Amstrad CPC, X68000; 1991 – Game Boy, PC Engine CD; 1998 – PlayStation (R-Types); 1999 – Game Boy Color (R-Type DX); 2002 – Mobile phone 2006 – PlayStation 3 (R-Types), Wii Virtual Console; 2009 – Xbox 360 (R-Type Dimensions); 2010 – iOS; 2011 – Android; 2014 – 3DS Virtual Console, Wii U Virtual Console; 2014 – PlayStation 3 (R-Type Dimensions); 2018 – Nintendo Switch, PlayStation 4, Steam (R-Type Dimensions EX) |
| R-Type Original release date(s): JP: July 1, 1987; NA: 1987 | Notes: The arcade version was published by Nintendo outside Japan.; Due to storage space limitations, the PC Engine version was split into two games, R-Type I and R-Type II.; Cited as one of the greatest video games ever created. |
| R-Type II Original release date(s): JP: December 1989; NA: 1989 | Release years by system: 1989 – Arcade 1991 – Amiga, Atari ST; 1991 – SNES (Super R-Type); 1992 – Game Boy; 1998 – PlayStation (R-Types); 1999 – Game Boy Color (R-Type DX); 2006 – PlayStation 3 (R-Types); 2008 – Wii Virtual Console (Super R-Type); 2009 – Xbox 360 (R-Type Dimensions); 2014 – Android, iOS; 2014 – PlayStation 3 (R-Type Dimensions); 2018 – Nintendo Switch, PlayStation 4, Steam (R-Type Dimensions EX) |
| R-Type II Original release date(s): JP: December 1989; NA: 1989 | Notes: A direct arcade sequel.; The SNES release is titled Super R-Type, featuring new stages and enemy types. |
| R-Type III: The Third Lightning Original release date(s): JP: December 10, 1993; NA: August 2, 1994; EU: 1994 | Release years by system: 1993 – SNES 2004 – Game Boy Advance; 2006 – Wii Virtual Console; 2026 – Nintendo Switch, Nintendo Switch 2, PlayStation 4, PlayStation 5, Xbox Series X/S Steam (R-Type Dimensions III) |
| R-Type III: The Third Lightning Original release date(s): JP: December 10, 1993; NA: August 2, 1994; EU: 1994 | Notes: Released simply as R-Type III in North America, published by Jaleco. |
| R-Type Delta Original release date(s): JP: November 19, 1998; NA: July 31, 1999; EU: 1999 | Release years by system: 1998 – PlayStation 2009 – PlayStation 3, PlayStation Vita; 2025 – Nintendo Switch, PlayStation 4, PlayStation 5, Xbox Series X/S Steam (R-Type Delta HD Boosted) |
| R-Type Delta Original release date(s): JP: November 19, 1998; NA: July 31, 1999; EU: 1999 | Notes: Stylized as R-Type Δ.; The first entry in the series to incorporate 3D graphics. |
| R-Type Final Original release date(s): JP: July 17, 2003; NA: February 2, 2004; EU: March 26, 2004 | Release years by system: 2003 – PlayStation 2 |
| R-Type Final Original release date(s): JP: July 17, 2003; NA: February 2, 2004; EU: March 26, 2004 | Notes: Intended to be the final game in the R-Type series.; Includes over 100 unlockable playable spaceships.; Published in North America by Eidos Interactive. |
| R-Type Final 2 Original release date(s): JP: April 29, 2021; NA: April 30, 2021; EU: April 30, 2021 | Release years by system: 2021 – Nintendo Switch, PC, PlayStation 4, Xbox One, Xbox Series X/S |
| R-Type Final 2 Original release date(s): JP: April 29, 2021; NA: April 30, 2021; EU: April 30, 2021 | Notes: A direct sequel to R-Type Final.; Developed by Granzella and published by Irem. |
| R-Type Final 3 Evolved Original release date(s): March 2023 | Release years by system: PlayStation 5 |
| R-Type Final 3 Evolved Original release date(s): March 2023 | Notes: A direct sequel to R-Type Final and R-Type Final 2 |

=== Spin-off games ===
| Game | Details |
|---|---|
| Armed Police Unit Gallop Original release date(s): JP: September 1991; NA: 1991 | Release years by system: 1991 – Arcade |
| Armed Police Unit Gallop Original release date(s): JP: September 1991; NA: 1991 | Notes: Also known as Cosmic Cop. |
| R-Type Leo Original release date(s): JP: December 1992 | Release years by system: 1992 – Arcade |
| R-Type Leo Original release date(s): JP: December 1992 | Notes: The final R-Type game to be released in arcades. |
| R-Type Tactics Original release date(s): JP: September 20, 2007; NA: May 6, 2008; EU: September 26, 2008 | Release years by system: 2007 – PlayStation Portable |
| R-Type Tactics Original release date(s): JP: September 20, 2007; NA: May 6, 2008; EU: September 26, 2008 | Notes: Released in North America as R-Type Command, published by Atlus.; Tactical role-playing game intermixed with elements from the R-Type series. |
| R-Type Tactics II: Operation Bitter Chocolate Original release date(s): JP: October 27, 2009 | Release years by system: 2009 – PlayStation Portable |
| R-Type Tactics II: Operation Bitter Chocolate Original release date(s): JP: October 27, 2009 | Notes: A sequel to R-Type Tactics.; Plans were made to release the game as R-Type Command II in North America, however, it was never released. |
| R-Type: Flash of the Void Original release date(s): JP: October 28, 2009 | Release years by system: 2009 – PlayStation Home |
| R-Type: Flash of the Void Original release date(s): JP: October 28, 2009 | Notes: A 3D spin-off game released for the now-defunct PlayStation Home network. |

== Compilations ==
| Game | Details |
|---|---|
| R-Types Original release date(s): JP: February 5, 1998; EU: October 1998; NA: March 1999 | Release years by system: 1998 – PlayStation 2006 – PlayStation 3 |
| R-Types Original release date(s): JP: February 5, 1998; EU: October 1998; NA: March 1999 | Notes: A compilation of both R-Type and R-Type II.; Later digitally re-released through the PlayStation Network under the PSOne Classics moniker. |
| R-Type DX Original release date(s): JP: March 21, 1999; NA: June 28, 1999; EU: July 20, 1999 | Release years by system: 1999 – Game Boy Color |
| R-Type DX Original release date(s): JP: March 21, 1999; NA: June 28, 1999; EU: July 20, 1999 | Notes: A compilation of both R-Type and R-Type II.; Includes a "DX Mode" that merges both titles into one game. |
| R-Type Dimensions Original release date(s): X360: WW: February 4, 2009; PS3: JP: May 20, 2014; Steam: WW: November 28, 2018; Switch: WW: December 13, 2018; PS4: WW: December 19, 2018 | Release years by system: 2009 – Xbox 360 2014 – PlayStation 3 2018 – Nintendo Switch, PlayStation 4, Steam |
| R-Type Dimensions Original release date(s): X360: WW: February 4, 2009; PS3: JP: May 20, 2014; Steam: WW: November 28, 2018; Switch: WW: December 13, 2018; PS4: WW: December 19, 2018 | Notes: Developed by Tozai Games.; A compilation of both R-Type and R-Type II, alongside 3D remakes for both games.; The Nintendo Switch, PlayStation 4 and Steam releases are titled R-Type Dimensions EX. |
| R-Type Tactics I • II Cosmos Original release date(s): JP: March 12, 2026; WW: June 18, 2026 | Release years by system: 2026 – Nintendo Switch, Nintendo Switch 2, PC, PlayStation 4, PlayStation 5, Xbox Series X/S |
| R-Type Tactics I • II Cosmos Original release date(s): JP: March 12, 2026; WW: June 18, 2026 | Notes: Developed by Granzella.; A compilation of both R-Type Tactics and R-Type Tactics II, and a remake using Unreal Engine 5 for both games.; R-Type Tactics II will have its first official western release.; Published by NIS America in the west. |
