= Zettai zetsumei =

Zettai zetsumei (絶体絶命 or rarer, 絶対絶命) is a phrase in Japanese meaning "to be in a desperate situation" or a stalemate. It may refer to:

== Music ==
- Zettai Zetsumei (album), a 2010 album by Japanese rock band Radwimps
- "Zettai Zetsumei" a song by heavy metal musician Demon Kogure, on his 2009 album Girls' Rock: Tiara
- "Zettai Zetsumei", a song by rock band Tokyo Jihen, on their 2010 album Sports
- "Zettai Zetsumei, a single by pop-rock band Cö Shu Nie, used as the first ending theme to The Promised Neverland
- "Zettai Zetsumei", a song from My First Story's album "S.S.S"

== Video games ==
- Zettai Zetsumei Toshi (絶体絶命都市, "The Desperated City"), the Japanese title of the 2002 PlayStation 2 game Disaster Report and its sequels
- Raw Danger!, released as Zettai Zetsumei Toshi 2: Itetsuita Kiokutachi in Japan
- Zettai Zetsumei Toshi 3: Kowareyuku Machi to Kanojo no Uta
- Zettai Zetsumei Toshi 4: Summer Memories
