= R-Type Final 2 =

- Developer: Granzella
- Publishers: JP: Granzella; WW: NIS America
- Series: R-Type
- Engine: Unreal Engine 4; Unreal Engine 5 (Final 3)
- Platforms: Nintendo Switch; PlayStation 4; Windows; Xbox One; Xbox Series X/S; PlayStation 5 (Final 3)
- Release: R-Type Final 2: JP: April 29, 2021; WW: April 30, 2021; R-Type Final 3 Evolved: JP: March 23, 2023; NA: April 25, 2023; EU: April 28, 2023
- Genre: Horizontal-scrolling shooter
- Mode: Single-player

R-Type Final 2 (Note: Japanese: アール・タイプ ファイナルツー, Hepburn: Āru Taipu Fainaru Tsū) is a horizontal-scrolling shooter video game developed and published by Granzella. Part of Irem's long-running R-Type series, it is a sequel to R-Type Final released in 2004, and the first R-Type game in over a decade, after the release of R-Type Tactics II: Operation Bitter Chocolate in 2009. The game was released for the Nintendo Switch, PlayStation 4, Windows, Xbox One, and Xbox Series X/S on April 29, 2021. An updated version titled R-Type Final 3 Evolved (Note: Japanese: アール・タイプ ファイナルスリー エボルブド, Hepburn: Āru Taipu Fainaru Surī Eborubudo) was released for the PlayStation 5 on March 23, 2023.

The western versions of the game are published by NIS America. R-Type Final 2 is the first game in the series to be released outside of Japan since R-Type Dimensions in 2009. It was released on April 30, 2021, and Final 3 Evolved was released in late April 2023.

== Development ==
On April 1, 2019, Granzella released a teaser trailer for R-Type Final 2. Later that day, the company confirmed via Twitter that the game was not an April Fools joke and was actively in development. A crowdfunding campaign was announced to be taking place in May, with an additional campaign also taking place in October the same year. The crowdfunding campaign ended on November 1, 2019, raising total of US$1,094,459 (¥118,673,775), to be develop in-game contents, including tribute battle stages from the previous R-TYPE titles, worldwide subtitles support. The developers announced that there would be rewards to give to those who contributed, receiving different sets of gifts depending on the various funded tiers they made into the project; these sets include the physical copy of the game, its digital version, the original soundtrack CD, a hardcover art book, and a T-shirt, as well as the contributor's name to be featured in the endgame credits. There were also 4 brand new player-ships developed for the title. The game was developed using Epic Games' Unreal Engine 4.

R-Type Final 2 was produced by Goro Matsuo and designed by Kazuma Kujo. Kujo previously worked on R-Type Delta, R-Type Tactics and R-Type Final, as well as in other titles like several games in the Disaster Report series. The game was released on April 29, 2021, in Japan, and on April 30, 2021, worldwide.

=== R-Type Final 3 Evolved ===
On June 18, 2021, Granzella Inc. confirmed the roadmap of updates with the free upgrade for R-Type Final 3 Evolved. On October 27, 2022, a website for R-Type Final 3 Evolved was revealed, announcing the game for PlayStation 5. The game brings back all stages from R-Type Final 2 and other stages from previous installments in the series fully remade in Unreal Engine 5 as well as seven stages personally made by designer Kazuma Kujo exclusive to the PlayStation 5. Other new features include a performance-based difficulty system, advanced customizations options for ships and pilots, global rankings, a virtual reality launch demo for the aircraft launch sequence, a new multiplayer mode that supports up to six players, and an online metaverse area called R Park. R Park serves as a lobby for the multiplayer mode where players can share strategies and compete in minigames for R Points that can be used for customization. On January 27, 2023, the game was officially announced to be released overseas by NIS America on April 28, 2023. A deluxe edition and special edition of the game were also made available for pre-order. The deluxe edition of the game includes a one-disc "Discovery" soundtrack and a softcover artbook. The special edition includes all content from the deluxe edition as well as a two-disc “Starfighter” soundtrack and an R-9A Arrowhead keychain light.

== Reception ==
Reception

Aggregate score
Aggregator	Score
Metacritic	PS4: 73/100; NS: 69/100; XSX: 78/100

Review scores
Publication	Score
Computer Games Magazine	7.5/10
Nintendo Life	6/10
Nintendo World Report	6.5/10
Push Square	7/10
Shacknews	7/10
The Games Machine	8.6/10

The PlayStation 4 version of R-Type Final 2 sold 8,693 physical copies within its first week on sale in Japan, and was the twelfth best-selling retail game of the week in the country. The Xbox Series X/S version of R-Type Final 2 received generally positive reviews, according to review aggregator website Metacritic. The PlayStation 4 and Switch versions of R-Type Final 2 received mixed or average reviews.
