= Cosmic Cop =

1991 video game

- Developer: Irem
- Publisher: Irem
- Artist: Akio Oyabu
- Platform: Arcade
- Release: JP: September 1991; NA: 1991
- Genre: Scrolling shooter
- Mode: Single-player
- Arcade system: Irem M-84 system

Cosmic Cop (Note: Also known as Armed Police Unit Gallop (アームドポリスユニットギャロップ, Āmudo Porisu Yunitto Gyaroppu) in Japan.) is a side-scrolling shoot 'em up arcade game produced by Irem in 1991. It is part of the popular R-Type video game series.

== Story ==
Taking place concurrently with R-Type Delta, Cosmic Cop sees the player as a member of the like-named private security organization tasked with hunting down autonomous vehicles driven berserk by the Bydo, dubbed "Mad Cars".

== Gameplay ==
Gameplay screenshot

The player pilots an R-Type fighter, the R-11B Peace Maker. As in most horizontal shooters the screen scrolls continuously to the right, but Cosmic Cop is unusual in that the scroll rate can be controlled by the player. The further right the player's craft is oriented onscreen, the faster the game scrolls.

Gameplay progresses through five different "zones", each culminating with a boss. Significant bonus points are awarded for completing the zones quickly.

The R-11B is armed with forward-firing guns, as well as a lock-on laser that automatically targets enemies, but whose energy depletes as it is fired. These weapons can be powered up twice by picking up a letter "P" and the laser's energy can be quickly refilled by picking up a letter "L".

Picking up a letter "M" will equip the R-11B with a missile unit that will fire one of three types of munitions: anti-air missiles, anti-ground missiles, or napalm bombs. Contact with any terrain will cause the missile unit to be lost.

== References to Cosmic Cop in other R-Type media ==
- The R-Type Special CD released in 1993 includes arrangements of the music from every R-Type arcade game, including Cosmic Cop.
- The R-11B has an entry in the library in the R-Types compilation for PlayStation.
- The R-11B is once again playable in R-Type Final, along with its improved successors the R-11S Tropical Angel and R-11S2 No Chaser. Final also includes the anti-ground missiles that originated in Cosmic Cop as a weapon, usable by many of the craft in the game.
- The R-11S variant is an available unit in R-Type Tactics.

== Reception ==
In Japan, Game Machine listed Cosmic Cop on their November 1, 1991 issue as being the thirteenth most-successful table arcade unit of the month.
