= Zettai Zetsumei Toshi 3: Kowareyuku Machi to Kanojo no Uta =

2009 video game

- Developer: Irem
- Publishers: Irem, Granzella Inc.
- Producer: Kazuma Kujo
- Platform: PlayStation Portable
- Release: JP: April 23, 2009
- Genre: Adventure
- Modes: Single-player, multiplayer

Zettai Zetsumei Toshi 3: Kowareyuku Machi to Kanojo no Uta (絶体絶命都市３ ─壊れゆく街と彼女の歌, The Desperate City 3: Damaged Town and Her Song) is the third game in the Disaster Report series, following Disaster Report and Raw Danger!. It was developed and published by Irem and was released in Japan and South Korea for the PSP in April 2009. It was supposed to be followed by a 2011 PlayStation 3 sequel titled Zettai Zetsumei Toshi 4: Summer Memories, though the release was cancelled after the 2011 Tōhoku earthquake and tsunami; eventually the sequel was released for the PlayStation 4, published by Granzella in 2018.

== Gameplay ==
Players can choose to play as a boy (Naoki Kōsaka) or a girl (Rina Makimura), both of whom start the game trapped in a bus a tunnel after a large earthquake. Survivors the player can encounter include Saki Honjō, a nurse turned amateur musician, and Ayami Hazuki, a high school girl. The two player characters have slightly different attributes, which affect gameplay: Naoki is physically strong and self-confident, but becomes stressed more easily, while Rina is physically weak but has a calmer personality, which causes her stress levels to rise more slowly.

During Disaster Report 3, the thirst and body temperature meter has been replaced by a stress meter. The meter rises after engaging in angry conversations and witnessing/experiencing various traumatic incidents. The player can choose from several responses during conversations, allowing them to choose how to behave towards fellow survivors. These responses allow the player to control the character's personality, and also have occasional effects on the character, such as lowering or raising their stress levels. High stress will affect the character's movements, causing them to have trouble walking. The character's health meter will drop during hazardous situations, such as touching fire or remaining in the vicinity of a gas leak. The character's status bars can be replenished or reduced by consuming food and medicine, or completely restored by resting on a bench, which also allows the player to save the game.

A number of different outfits and compasses can be collected during the game.

2-4 players can play cooperatively via ad hoc connection, unlike the first two games, which were only single player.

== Plot ==
Leaving their home for a new life in a Megalopolis as a university student is a dream come true for Naoki/Rina. However, the dream soon turns into a nightmare when an earthquake strikes and destroys the city, leaving Naoki/Rina trapped in a tunnel. Now they must survive the catastrophe using wit, physical prowess and luck, rescue other survivors trapped in the debris and run to find reinforcements, or any sort of help.

During the game, the player gets to interact with their two female companions, the relationship between them affecting the ending. Hazuki is held at gunpoint on the edge of a skyscraper by her half brother, Yoichi, as he reveals his plan for revenge over the murder of his beloved daughter. He's then attacked by the player as Saki distracts him. The building is suddenly hit by waves, causing Hazuki to lose balance. The player can then opt to save her or let her die. Letting her die will lead to a neutral bad end. Saving her will also lead to a bad end if the player has negative or neutral relationships with both characters, the player dying along with Hazuki. Having positive relationships with either will save both Hazuki and the player, leading to a good end in which the player supports Saki in her singing career or stays with Hazuki to ensure her happiness. There are also bad endings gained by abandoning your companions to escape alone or sacrificing yourself during cutscene choices.

== Reception ==
- Famitsu score = 28/40 (7/7/7/7)
- 1st week sales = 31,207 (#04 Japanese PSP charts)
- 2nd week sales = 12,525 (#17 Japanese PSP charts)
