= Kyoei Toshi =

2017 PlayStation 4 video game

- Developer: Granzella
- Publisher: Bandai Namco Entertainment
- Engine: Orochi 3
- Platform: PlayStation 4
- Release: JP: October 19, 2017
- Genre: Survival
- Mode: Single-player

Kyoei Toshi (巨影都市; lit. City of Giant Shadows), known in English as City Shrouded in Shadow, is a 2017 survival video game developed by Granzella and published by Bandai Namco Entertainment for the PlayStation 4. The objective of the game is to escape a city ravaged by battles between monsters, robots, and heroes from the Japanese kaiju, mecha, and tokusatsu franchises Godzilla, Ultraman, Gamera, Patlabor, and Neon Genesis Evangelion.

Kyoei Toshi is a spiritual successor to Granzella's Disaster Report series, and several characters from that series also make cameo appearances in the game.

== Plot ==
An in-game screenshot of Ken and Yuki speaking with a Riot Police Unit officer, who tells them to use the blue sedan in front of them to escape a Legion swarm; the player can choose whether or not Ken and Yuki will use the sedan.

The game is set in the fictional Ichi City in Japan, which is attacked by mysterious giant monsters called kyoei ("giant shadows"). The player can choose between two player characters—a man named Ken Misaki or a woman named Miharu Matsuhara (the character may be renamed)—with the objective being to try to escape Ichi City with their partner Yuki. After witnessing a deal between yakuza, they must also escape a hitman who pursues them across the city. During their escape, the player learns more about Yuki's past and her connection to the kyoei.

== Cast ==
- Takuya Sato as Ken Misaki
- Satomi Akesaka as Miharu Matsubara
- Reina Ueda as Yuki Kouno
- Ryōta Takeuchi as Hideyasu Otsuka
- Yuko Kaida as Risa Kashiwagi
- Minoru Kawai as Ryoji Shibata
- Toru Nara as Katsuhiro Muto
- Madoka Shiga as Toru Fujiwara

== Giant Shadows ==
The objective of Kyoei Toshi is to survive the giant monsters or mechas encountered in the 17 levels of the game. Some giants are benevolent, only a threat due to the massive collateral damage they cause; some are malevolent, actively seeking destruction; while others are neutral and indifferent to human life.

Listed below are the "shadows", grouped by their franchise of origin and sorted by appearance.

Ultraman

- Alien Zarab/Imitation Ultraman – Level 1
- Ultraman – Levels 1 and 14
- Kyrieloid – Level 9
- Ultraman Tiga – Level 9
- Dada A/B/C – Level 11
- Ultraman Belial – Level 14
- Ultraman Taro – Level 14
- Ultraman Zero – Level 14
- Ultraseven – Level 17
- Pandon – Level 17

Gamera (Heisei Trilogy)

- Legion Soldiers – Levels 2 and 16
- Legion Plant – Levels 2 and 16
- Gamera – Levels 2, 10, and 16
- Gyaos – Level 10

Godzilla

- Mothra (Heisei) – Level 3
- Battra – Level 3
- Godzilla (Heisei) – Levels 6, 8, and 13
- King Ghidorah (Heisei) – Level 8
- Mechagodzilla (MFS-3 Kiryu) – Level 13

Patlabor (TV series)

- Type-5G/1C Grau Bear – Level 4
- CRL-98 Pyro-Buster – Level 4
- AV-98 Ingram 1 – Levels 4 and 7
- AV-98 Ingram 2 – Level 7
- Type J-9 Griffon – Level 7
- Type M-5 Abraham – Level 7

Rebuild of Evangelion

- Sachiel the 4th Angel – Level 5
- Evangelion Unit-01 – Levels 5, 12, and 15
- Shamshel the 5th Angel – Level 12
- Sahaquiel the 8th Angel – Level 15
- Evangelion Unit-02 – Level 15
- Evangelion Unit-00 – Level 15

== Development ==
The game was announced via teaser website, which opened on September 4, 2015. A seven-day countdown was launched on September 10, 2015. Kyoei Toshi was officially revealed on September 17, 2015. A livestream on the game started on December 14, 2015, via 876TV live stream to show off a game preview.

On May 30, 2017, producer Kensuke Tsukanaka said in an interview that a Vita version was cancelled since the decision was made to improve the game's quality on the PlayStation 4.

It was developed by Granzella and directed by Kazuma Kujo. Takashi Watabe was the producer on behalf of the publisher Bandai Namco.

The game features the theme song "Shadow", performed by Mai Iida.

== Release ==
The game launched on October 19, 2017, in Japan. The game's secret costumes were taken from Ultraman, Evangelion, and Patlabor. It also includes costumes from previous Disaster Report games.

A secret mission was added to the game if players pre-ordered the game between July 6 and November 15, 2017, where PlayStation mascots Toro and Kuro ask for the player's help to finish Zettai Anzen Toshi 2.

Kyoei Toshi was released under a Welcome Price version in Japan worth 3,800 Yen on February 29, 2019.

== Reception ==
The game sold 48,935 copies within its first week on sale in Japan, placing it at number two on the all format sales charts.

Famitsu gave the game a 8/8/7/8 [31/40] score.
