= Model R =

Model R may refer to:

- Curtiss Model R, a WWI U.S. utility airplane
- Gee Bee Model R, a 1930s racing airplane
- Stinson Model R, a 1930s light airplane
- Wright Model R, a 1910 airplane

== See also ==
- R (disambiguation)
- R class (disambiguation)
- Type R (disambiguation)
- Mack R series, a Class 8 heavy-duty truck
- International Harvester R-Series, 1950s truck
