= MotorStorm: Apocalypse =

2011 video game

- European box art
- Developer: Evolution Studios
- Publisher: Sony Computer Entertainment
- Director: Matt Southern
- Designer: Paul Rustchynsky
- Programmers: James Burns; Oli Wright; Russell Payne
- Artists: Dom Wright; Neil Massam; Nick Sadler; Andy Seymour
- Writer: Richard Boon
- Composers: Klaus Badelt; DJ Shadow; Elite Force; Noisia
- Series: MotorStorm
- Platform: PlayStation 3
- Release: AU: 17 March 2011; EU: 31 March 2011; NA: 3 May 2011
- Genre: Racing
- Modes: Single-player, multiplayer

MotorStorm: Apocalypse is a 2011 racing video game developed by Evolution Studios and published by Sony Computer Entertainment for the PlayStation 3. It is the fourth game in the MotorStorm series and the third for the PlayStation 3. The title was revealed shortly before the beginning of the Electronic Entertainment Expo 2010 on the PlayStation Blog by Evolution Studios on 6 June.

The planned UK release date of MotorStorm: Apocalypse was 16 March 2011, but was delayed by Sony Computer Entertainment UK following the 2011 Tōhoku earthquake and tsunami in Japan. The Australian launch went ahead as planned on 17 March, but Sony announced further shipments of the game to that country were halted in the wake of the disaster. The planned North American release date of 12 April was delayed again by Sony who later confirmed new releases dates of 31 March in the UK and 3 May in North America. The Multiplayer servers were closed on 27 August 2018.

== Story ==
Apocalypse is more story-driven than previous instalments. The events of Apocalypse's MotorStorm Festival are told from the perspective of three participants, labelled Mash "The Rookie", Tyler "The Pro", and Big Dog "The Veteran" by Evolution Studios, with each participant also representing a difficulty level of gameplay. These three participants will each see different parts of the catastrophe unfold over the course of the three-day festival. In the game, racers participate in a three-day festival in a decaying city known as The City, which is the aftermath of a natural disaster. The game is the first in the series to feature an urban setting, as opposed to natural environments. The game has a single-player mode with 40 tracks across three difficulty levels. Each difficulty level focuses on a different racer's story. The game also has a multiplayer mode with support for up to four-player splitscreen races locally, and up to two-player split-screen online. Other online features include 16-player racing, vehicle customization, performance perks, and wagering.

=== Setting ===
The game takes place in an apocalyptic urban area called The City, based on the West Coast of the United States (in particular California's Bay Area). The game consists of more than 40 tracks that can be altered from active catastrophic earthquakes and tornadoes as well as helicopters crashing through buildings.

== Gameplay ==
New vehicles in the game include supercars, superbikes, hot hatches, muscle cars and choppers. Apocalypse is the first game in the MotorStorm series to focus on an urban setting as opposed to natural environments. The city that the Festival takes place in is enduring the throes of a massive natural disaster, causing the man-made structures in the city to visibly deteriorate. As players race through the tracks, the tracks can change in real-time; bridges can buckle and twist, buildings collapse and rifts open up beneath the vehicles as they drive. Players can also customize their vehicles with vinyls, vehicle parts, and modify the vehicle's handling, boosting and offensive abilities through perks. They are able to create and design their own game rules for online tournaments. A new gameplay element is the addition of "air cooling" one's boost. Similar to driving through cool water in Pacific Rift would speed up the rate of boost cooling, releasing the accelerator over a large jump will also cause the boost temperature gauge to drop quicker.

A new challenge in Apocalypse is the introduction of people who try to interfere in the event. The City houses two factions, known as the Crazies and DuskLite, who vie for survival. The Crazies try to impede the progress of the racers. They loot broken buildings, break into fights on the streets, steal cars and try to slam racers off the road, and attack racers with firearms. A private military company known as DuskLite attempts to enforce order and their involvement creates additional hazards for racers to overcome such as an attack helicopter firing missiles onto the track.

=== Vehicles ===
Five new vehicle classes: the supercar, superbike, muscle car, chopper and the hot hatch, are new additions, with the original MotorStorm vehicles, ranging from the MX Motocross bike to the Monster Truck, being included.

Three DLC packs included new vehicles: The first DLC is "Revelation" pack, containing four vehicles that could be either bought entirely or individually.

The second DLC is "Remix" pack, consisting three vehicles from the original MotorStorm game such as the Mojave Slugger, the Patriot Surger and the Voodoo Iguana.

The third DLC is the "Prestige" Pack, consisting a rally car and two supercars that could be bought entirely or individually.

== Development ==
=== Title sequence ===
After watching the title sequence for Smokin' Aces, Alan McDermott from Evolution approached VooDooDog to explore developing a Hollywood blockbuster title sequence for the game. This was the first time VooDooDog had worked on a game title sequence, however Paul Donnellon notes in his interview with Codeshop that the approach was very similar to that of creating a music video, with music being a key element holding the elements together. In an article by Edge special mention is made to the way VooDooDog developed custom fonts in Donnellon explained: "We wanted to try different handmade fonts. We wanted to build it into the walls like graffiti, so we had no choice; it wasn't something we could just grab together. We do make an effort to make it interesting if we can, but so long as people can read it. Even on film titles we try to push it more because, to us, typography alone isn't enough".

== Release ==
The game was released in spring 2011 in Europe and North America. The game was initially scheduled to be released in New Zealand on 16 March, but following a magnitude 6.3 earthquake in the country in February, the game release was delayed indefinitely. Similarly, the game's release in Japan was also delayed indefinitely after an earthquake and tsunami struck the country on 10 March – the game's originally scheduled release date. The cancellation was confirmed by Sony Computer Entertainment Japan three months later, with no reason given at the time. Sony Computer Entertainment Europe also delayed the game's release in the UK, stating in relation the disaster in Japan: "We are very conscious of the parallels between these events and the underlying theme in MotorStorm and are doing everything we can to be as sensitive as possible to the situation".

The game was first released in Asia on 16 March 2011. In Australia, the game was launched as scheduled on 17 March, but Sony halted any further shipments and pulled all advertising campaigns for the game.

=== Pre-order bonuses ===
In the North America three DLC packs were available as pre-order incentives, each available from a specific retailler. Each pack included a PlayStation Network avatar, an XMB theme and unique vehicle designs and stickers which the player could use to customise other vehicles.

== Reception ==
Reception

Aggregate score
Aggregator	Score
Metacritic	77/100

Review scores
Publication	Score
1Up.com	B
The A.V. Club	C+
Eurogamer	8/10
Game Informer	8.25/10
GameRevolution	B
GameSpot	8.5/10
GameTrailers	8.5/10
Giant Bomb	3/5
IGN	8/10
Joystiq	3/5
PlayStation: The Official Magazine	8/10
Push Square	9/10
The Telegraph	8/10
The Guardian	3/5
Metro	7/10

MotorStorm: Apocalypse received "generally favorable reviews" according to the review aggregation website Metacritic. GamePro criticized the game for its "underwhelming graphics" and for the game being similar to the game, Split/Second, giving it three stars out of five. However, GameSpot praised it for its variety of multiplayer options, well-designed tracks and destructible environments. Edge gave it eight out of 10, saying that the game "has a special relationship with chaos, and if you can keep your head when all about you are throwing their controllers, you're just as likely to lose. Less battle than survival racing, it's happy to let fairness be a stain on the tarmac." GameZone gave it 6.5 out of 10, saying: "For anyone looking for a fresh new racing game on the PS3, things could get a lot worse than Motorstorm: Apocalypse, but they could also be a little better."

== See also ==
- Impact of the 2011 Tōhoku earthquake and tsunami on the video game industry
