= Impact of the 2011 Tōhoku earthquake and tsunami on the video game industry =

The 2011 Tōhoku earthquake had a significant impact on the nation of Japan, including one of its most well-known economic sectors, the video game industry. The damage to Japan's infrastructure prompted delays in software and hardware releases, and also caused outright cancellations when the subject matter of the software was considered too similar to real-life events. At the same time, the Japanese gaming industry took on relief efforts to assist those most directly affected by the earthquake and subsequent tsunami.

Members of the gaming industry contributed donations to support foundations including several large donations from video game-oriented companies such as Nintendo, Sony Computer Entertainment, Namco Bandai, Sega Sammy, Capcom, and Tecmo Koei, and have also encouraged donations from individuals. Several online games helped donate money to the relief effort, including EVE Online and Zynga's Facebook games. Thirty-six hours after the initial tremor, Zynga had gathered donations adding up to $1.35 million.

== Background ==
Map showing the epicenter of the earthquake

A 9.0-magnitude megathrust earthquake occurred off the coast of Japan on 11 March 2011. The epicenter was 130 kilometers (81 mi) off the east coast of the Oshika Peninsula of Tōhoku near Sendai, with the hypocenter at a depth of 32 km (19.9 mi). The earthquake triggered extremely destructive tsunami waves of up to 10 meters (33 ft) that struck Japan minutes after the quake, in some cases traveling up to 10 km (6 mi) inland, with smaller waves reaching many other countries after several hours. Tsunami warnings were issued and evacuations ordered along Japan's Pacific coast and at least 20 other countries, including the entire Pacific coast of North America and South America.

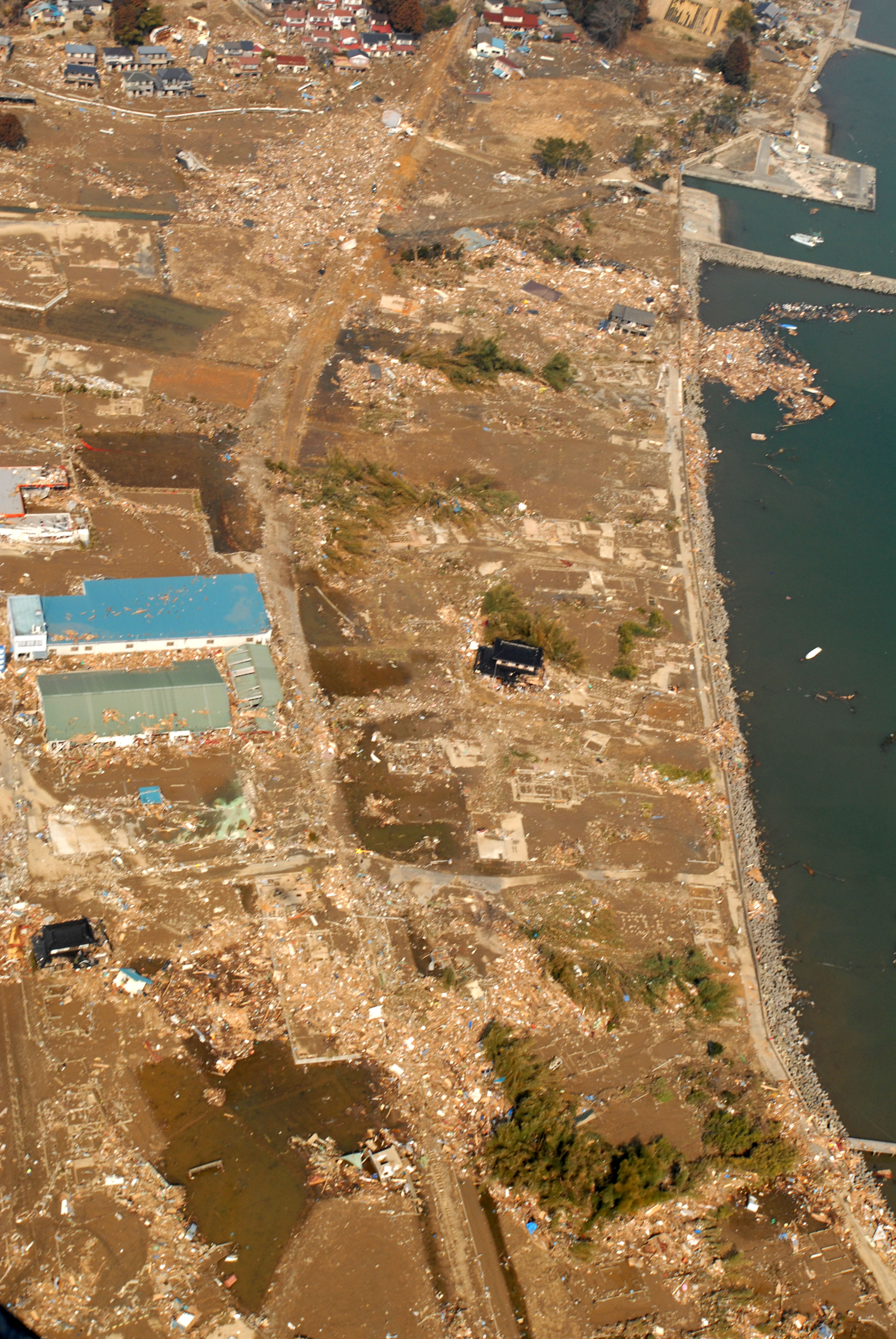
Aftermath of the 2011 Tōhoku earthquake and tsunami that took place near Tōhoku, Japan.

The Japanese National Police Agency officially confirmed a large number of casualties across seventeen prefectures. The earthquake and tsunami caused extensive and severe damage in Japan, including heavy damage to roads and railways as well as fires in many areas, and a dam collapse. Around 4.4 million households in northeastern Japan were left without electricity and 1.5 million without water. Many electrical generators were taken down, and at least three nuclear reactors suffered explosions due to hydrogen buildup within their outer containment buildings.

Estimates of the Tōhoku earthquake's magnitude make it the most powerful known earthquake to hit Japan, and one of the five most powerful earthquakes in the world overall since modern record-keeping began in 1900. Japanese Prime Minister Naoto Kan said that the crisis was the country's "toughest and most difficult" since World War II. The earthquake moved Honshu 2.4 m (7.9 ft) east and shifted the Earth on its axis by almost 10 cm (3.9 in). Early estimates placed insured losses from the earthquake alone at US$14.5 to $34.6 billion. The Bank of Japan offered ¥15 trillion (US$183 billion) to the banking system on 14 March 2011 in an effort to normalize market conditions.

== Effects on business ==
The disaster resulted in a drop in stocks at the Tokyo Stock Exchange for many video game companies at the Monday close following. Eurogamer's Gamesindustry.biz website reported that Sega Sammy's dropped 13.5 percent, ending up at ¥1530; Tecmo Koei's fell 10.7 percent to ¥626; Konami's fell 9.9 percent to ¥1610; Sony's fell 9.1 percent to ¥2550; Nintendo's fell 7.6 percent to ¥21,280; Namco Bandai's fell 6.4 percent to ¥905; and Square Enix's fell 6.2 percent to ¥1370. Edge also reported drops, but lower amounts for Sega Sammy, Nintendo, and Square Enix: 1.3 percent, 1.1 percent, and 4.5 percent, respectively. Capcom's shares fell 14.4 percent, and the company announced closures of ten amusement arcades in the Tōhoku and Kantō regions due to damage. The top 20 titles sold around 568,000 units between 6 and 12 March. In the same time period, the top 10 video game systems sold close to 195,000 units. Anoop Gantayat writing for IGN, however, speculated that most video game sales in Japan stopped when the earthquake occurred. Gamasutra's Tom Curtis noted that most titles on Japan's charts dropped in sales the following week; the top 20 titles sold approximately 275,000 units. He further noted that the top seller, Dynasty Warriors 7, sold 75 percent fewer copies compared to the previous week, when it debuted at number one.

No employees of Japan's gaming community have been reported as casualties of the quake or the subsequent tsunami. IGN writers noted that most video game companies are a "significant distance" from the earthquake's epicenter. Soon after the disaster struck, rumors began circulating that Pokémon series creator Satoshi Tajiri, among other Japanese celebrities, had died in the tsunami; however, this turned out to be false when he tweeted that he was, in fact, alive. Several artists and designers used their online presences on social networking sites to provide information not only on their own situations, but to inform others of the disaster's impact. Hideo Kojima, Masahiro Sakurai, Goichi Suda and Fumito Ueda used their Twitter accounts to pass on information, with Suda encouraging his colleagues to seek shelter. Kojima announced that he would be leaving his offices for power saving reasons. Ace Attorney series art director Tatsuro Iwamoto illustrated an image of characters from the series saying "Let's work hard and not be defeated by the earthquake!!", specifically making usage of how character Miles Edgeworth has a canonical fear of earthquakes. Nintendo's American subsidiary in Redmond, Washington provided updates on the status of the company headquarters and its employees.

=== Delays and cancellations ===
When asked if the Nintendo 3DS' launch in Europe and North America would be affected by the situation, Nintendo gave indication that the former will be unaffected. It elaborated that business operations and future product shipments would be unaffected. Video games analyst Michael Pachter commented that it was difficult to assess how much impact the disaster will have, commenting that a company like Nintendo will not suffer as many set backs in the release of software as other companies have, such as Sony. He noted that if the threat of a nuclear plant meltdown grows stronger, the industry could be placed in much more dire straits. Pachter also noted that while Japanese software delays would not impact the United States market, hardware shortages could. Related hardware manufacturing industries have also indirectly affected video gaming. For example, Japan's manufacturers make up 70% of world's supply of anisotropic conductive films for LCD production, and can, among other devices, affect Nintendo DS panel production. The iPad, which companies began developing games for soon after its release, was expected to be available in short supply due to components that are manufactured in Japan. Apple indefinitely delayed the Japanese release of the iPad 2. Due to production disruptions, Sony announced that it may decide to limit the initial release of PlayStation Vita to one region by the end of 2011. Investment research company Zachs described the situation as uncertain, adding that if there is a radiation leak at Fukushima's nuclear plants, it could shut down operations all over Japan.

Early screenshot of Ryū ga Gotoku of the End, depicting a city in ruin. It was erroneously believed to portray an "earthquake or other natural disaster".

The disaster's effects on Japan has affected a number of planned releases. Jesse Divnich, an analyst for EEDAR, expected video game delays to be the biggest impact of the disaster on the video game industry, asserting this as being due to the inflexibility of development schedules. Kevin Gifford of 1UP.com noted that the country's "strained" distribution networks and the number of consumers focused on the events of the disaster would result in losses should a video game be released. Some games, due to their subject matter being perceived as too similar to the real-life events, have had their releases delayed indefinitely, including Sony Computer Entertainment's MotorStorm: Apocalypse. While it has entered distribution channels in the United Kingdom, Sony announced that they will cease any further shipments and remove marketing material for it. Sega similarly delayed their video game, Ryū ga Gotoku of the End, indefinitely. Early in Ryū ga Gotoku of the End's unveiling, it was mistakenly thought to depict an "earthquake or other natural disaster." Irem's upcoming release of Zettai Zetsumei Toshi 4: Summer Memories and Poncotsu Roman Daikatsugeki Bumpy Trot 2 has been cancelled altogether (with the former being re-announced in 2015 with a different title, developer and platform), with the publisher issuing an apology; the game would have been the fourth in a series of survival action games where players would need to escape a city after the onset of a major disaster, specifically a large earthquake in Zettai Zetsumei Toshi 4. Pre-release orders reportedly rose after the disaster.

There have been delays of video games that are not related to earthquakes or disasters; Nintendo delayed the release of their Nintendo 3DS video game Steel Diver in Japan from its original release date of 17 March, Major League Baseball 2K11 and Top Spin 4 were both delayed from their intended release date of April, and Toaru Kagaku no Railgun for the PlayStation Portable. The delay of Steel Diver is in spite of a statement by Nintendo that it would not postpone the release of any games. Microsoft delayed the release of Dragon Age Origins: Awakening due to "distribution disruption", Capcom delayed the first download content pack for Marvel vs. Capcom 3: Fate of Two Worlds in Japan and Ubisoft similarly delayed download content for Assassin's Creed Brotherhood in Japan.

Some companies took steps to conserve energy by shutting down servers used for Internet gaming. Square Enix shut down its servers for Final Fantasy XI and Final Fantasy XIV, while Konami suspended the servers for Metal Gear Online indefinitely. The two Final Fantasy games along with the PlayOnline service accounted for 11 percent of Square Enix's energy consumption the previous month. After implementing other energy consumption efforts to reduce energy usage by over 10 percent, including lighting reduction and ceasing office climate control, the company planned to restart the services on 25 March. Nintendo shut down service for Pokémon Global Link, a feature that was part of the newest additions to the franchise. Due to this shutdown, the release date of the feature for other countries has been delayed. Hitachi, one of Nintendo's suppliers for the manufacture of its Nintendo DS handheld system, has indicated that deliveries of its materials may be delayed, depending on whether its factories are shut down for a period of time. Sony announced that while PlayStation Network services for the PlayStation 3 and PlayStation Portable would not be interrupted, users may experience connection problems, and some content updates will be delayed. Sony later urged PSN users to back up their data. Microsoft delayed the launch of some of their Xbox 360's Xbox Live features that they had planned to release in the week following the disaster. In Japan, Sony temporarily closed their call centers, while it and Microsoft both closed their repair centers.

A number of gaming-related events were canceled in the wake of the disaster. These include a number of demos for video games such as BlazBlue: Continuum Shift II, Dragon Ball Zenkai Battle Royal, and others. An event planned to be held for the release of Ryū ga Gotoku of the End to allow fans to have their copies signed in Hiroshima and Osaka was also canceled. A Monster Hunter themed event called "Monster Hunter Festa" was also cancelled. Microsoft delayed a tour to advertise its Kinect controller. The video game tournament Evolution vs Godsgarden was canceled over logistic concerns related to the disaster's impact.

The earthquake had a significant impact on the ending of Chunsoft's Zero Escape: Virtue's Last Reward. The ending of the game is a cliffhanger that depicts humanity's downfall due to a virus infection and mass-suicide; this included a scene in which a newscaster commits suicide live on air. Writer and director Kotaro Uchikoshi felt that the ending on its own would be inappropriate following the Tōhoku earthquake, and so an extra meta ending was added, to give the ending a more hopeful feeling. In this ending an entity representing the player is heavily implied to have entered the game's world through the consciousness of character Kyle to help protagonists Sigma and Phi save the world. This ending, intended to be entirely non-canonical, heavily impacted how many fans interpreted the lore of Zero Escape, which Uchikoshi has since regretted.

== Donations and assistance ==
=== Japanese response ===
Several Japanese video game publishers donated relief to Japan; this includes Nintendo, which donated 300 million yen; Sony, which donated 300 million yen and 30,000 radios; Sega Sammy, which donated 200 million yen, and Namco Bandai, Capcom, and Tecmo Koei, which donated 100 million each. CyberConnect2 opened its offices and offered aid to 30 people from the general public. Sega promised to donate all proceeds earned from Football Manager 2011 and its Sonic the Hedgehog titles available for iOS platforms for a week, beginning on 15 March 2011. Capcom lowered the price of the iOS version of Street Fighter IV from $4.99 to $0.99, donating the proceeds of its sales from that point on to tsunami relief. iOS developer 5pb. slashed the prices of its games from ¥2200 to ¥350 and donating all proceeds to the Red Cross until 31 March. Arc System Works employee Toshimichi Mori commented that he was in talks with his company on making downloadable content to donate some of the proceeds. Nippon Ichi announced that the earnings from the downloadable content release of a character in Disgaea 4 would retail for ¥100 under the name "Fans of Disgaea 4". Square Enix pledged to donate ¥100 million, as well as giving gamers with Square Enix accounts to use points called "Square Enix Crysta" to donate. They also set up a "worldwide employee charity fund". Level-5 donated 10 million yen, as well as pledging to release charity items through its video game Inazuma Eleven Mobile.

=== International response ===
Online gaming publications have launched relief drives of their own. IGN started up a fundraiser, wherein its staff plays 24 Japanese-made games in 24 hours in an attempt to garner donations of $24,000, while Brian Crecente of Kotaku will host the Japan Earthquake Relief Fundraiser on 24 March 2011 in Denver, Colorado, in which proceeds will go to the Japanese Red Cross Society. Game Informer's Meagan Marie put up for auction her Mario-themed Nintendo DS autographed by several people with links to Nintendo, including Shigeru Miyamoto, Koji Kondo, Eiji Aonuma, Charles Martinet, and Martin Leung, with the proceeds to go to Japanese relief. Siliconera put up for auction an action figure of the fictional character Cecil from Dissidia: Final Fantasy, signed by Final Fantasy IV designer Takashi Tokita. The industry's online auction efforts organized into Play For Japan, which acts as an online hub for auctions of collectible video game paraphernalia.

Non-Japanese video game companies also provided assistance. Mastiff, in addition to a sum of money already donated, pledged to donate $100 for every 100 Facebook likes their page receives, up to $25,000 worth. Shawnimals discounted two video games, Wee Ninja and Wee Devil, to $10, pledging to donate all profits made to the relief fund. EVE Online players are able to donate the game's in-game currency, which will be converted into real-world money and given to the Red Cross, and players of select Facebook games by Zynga, such as FarmVille and CityVille, can purchase special in-game items, whose profits would go to helping support the Japanese relief effort. 36 hours in, Zynga has collected approximately $1.35 million. ScrewAttack announced that all profits made from their game, Texting of the Bread, would go to the American Red Cross. NEXON Corporation announced that all profits made from specific in-game items for sale in their games, such as MapleStory, will go to the relief effort. American developer and publisher PopCap Games, in partnership with the Red Cross, discounted its entire line of iOS games and pledged to donate all proceeds to relief efforts. Valve announced that they will be donating all proceeds from the purchase of certain items purchased in their game Team Fortress 2. Publisher Aksys Games initiated a charity sales drive where all gross proceeds from sales from their website would be donated to Red Cross, raising $34,162.33. NCsoft pledged to donate ¥500 million (approx €4.5 million/£3.9 million/$6.3 million), which they describe as "one month's earnings". They also pledged to provide "payment support" to quake victims who cannot log in for "extended periods". Riot Games created charity skins for their League of Legends games that people could purchase, with all proceeds being donated to the Red Cross for Earthquake relief.
