= R-Type III: The Third Lightning =

1993 video game

- North American Super NES cover art
- Developers: Tamtex; Raylight Studios (GBA)
- Publishers: Irem: JP/EU: Irem; NA: Jaleco; NA: Retro-bit (re-release as R-Type Returns); NA: Destination Software (GBA); EU: Zoo Digital (GBA); NA: Retro-bit (re-release alongside Super R-Type)
- Designer: Kengo Miyata
- Programmer: Y. Suzuki
- Composer: Ikuko Mimori
- Platform: SNES: SNES, Game Boy Advance, Wii Virtual Console
- Release: December 10, 1993: SNES; JP: December 10, 1993; NA: August 2, 1994; PAL: 1994 Game Boy Advance; NA: March 26, 2004; PAL: November 19, 2004
- Genre: Side-scrolling shooter
- Modes: Single-player, multiplayer

R-Type III: The Third Lightning (アールタイプ3 ザ・サード・ライトニング, Āru Taipu Surī: Za Sādo Raitoningu) is a 1993 side-scrolling shooter video game developed by Tamtex and first released in Japan by Irem in 1993 for the Super Famicom and in North America and Europe in 1994 for the SNES.

== Gameplay ==
R-Type III: The Third Lightning was the first game in the series to introduce new Forces. As well as the original Force (which was now named the Round Force, later named as the Standard Force in R-Type Delta), the player could choose from two other Forces: the Shadow Force and the Cyclone Force. These both had new, different weapon sets and special enhancements.

It also refined the weapons and charging system. It reverted to the original red-blue-yellow weapon system, and the Diffusion Wave Cannon from R-Type II was replaced with a more standard wave cannon. Charging this cannon to full beam strength results in a massive, powerful beam that passes through all enemies and obstacles. A new weapon called the Hyper Wave Cannon was also added to the ship, which the player could use instead of the normal wave cannon if desired. By switching to Hyper mode and supercharging the wave cannon, the ship temporarily gains the ability to use the Hyper Wave Cannon, which is unique among wave cannons in having a rapid fire capability. The shots fired create damaging explosions, and if the player has collected one or two Bits, they spin around the ship burning with energy. However, this Hyper mode causes the ship to overheat after a short while, and it must subsequently spend seconds cooling down, during which time the wave cannon is inoperative.

The fighter in R-Type III is identified in R-Type Final as the R-9Ø Ragnarök; it was originally referred to as the 'R-90'. In fact, the original R-90 has been split into three in Final: the R-9S Strike Bomber has the R-90's basic Standard force unit and first wave cannon, identified as the Mega Wave Cannon. Final's version of the R-90 has the Shadow Force and Hyper Wave Cannon, but is unable to choose its Force or switch between Wave Cannons. Finally, the R-9Ø2 Ragnarok II has the R-90's final Force, the Cyclone Force, and the Giga Wave Cannon, which can be charged through 7 loops. It can be assumed that this is because the original R-90 would simply be too powerful for the game to be any kind of challenge.

== Release ==
R-Type III was originally released only on the Super NES, but later ported to the Game Boy Advance by Italy-based Raylight Studios.

The SNES version was released for download on the Nintendo Wii's Virtual Console, but was delisted in Japan on March 30, 2012, Europe on March 31, 2012 and North America on January 2, 2013.

At the CES 2018, Retro-bit has announced that they would be re-releasing R-Type III: The Third Lightning as well as its other installments on a Super NES multicart that was released in May 2018, having a Standard Edition and a Limited Collector’s Edition as well.

R-Type III: The Third Lightning is a game built into Retro-Bit's Super Retrocade, which features a number of legally-licensed titles. (In the version 1.1 release of that product, the first R-Type and R-Type II are also included games.)

R-Type III would receive a high definition remake called R-Type Dimensions III on May 18, 2026 for PlayStation 5, Nintendo Switch, Nintendo Switch 2 and PC through Steam, developed by KRITZELKRATZ 3000 and published by ININ.

== Reception ==
Reception

Aggregate scores
Aggregator	Score	
Aggregator	GBA	SNES
GameRankings	57.72%	N/A
Metacritic	46/100	N/A

Review scores
Publication	Score	
Publication	GBA	SNES
Computer and Video Games	N/A	88/100
Electronic Gaming Monthly	N/A	8/10, 8/10, 8/10, 8/10, 8/10
Famitsu	N/A	8/10, 6/10, 7/10, 8/10
Game Informer	6.25/10	N/A
Game Players	N/A	83%
GameFan	N/A	85/100, 90/100, 89/100
GamesMaster	N/A	89%
GameSpot	2.8/10	N/A
Hyper	N/A	90%
IGN	7.5/10	N/A
Nintendo Power	82/100	N/A
Official Nintendo Magazine	44%	93/100
Retro Gamer	83%	N/A
Super Play	N/A	83%
Total!	N/A	(UK) 88%, (DE) 2-
Nintendo Game Zone	N/A	90/100
Nintendo Magazine System	N/A	79/100
Pocket Games	2/10	N/A
SNES Force	N/A	89/100
Super Action	N/A	84%
Super Control	N/A	89%
Super Gamer	N/A	91/100
VideoGames	N/A	9/10

R-Type III: The Third Lightning received a 22.0/30 score in a readers' poll conducted by Super Famicom Magazine. The game also garnered generally favorable reception from critics. Electronic Gaming Monthly's five reviewers gave the Super NES version a unanimous score of 8 out of 10 each, commenting that "Huge levels, excellent bosses (and a rather high difficulty) makes this the shooter to get." They also praised the inclusion of a two-player mode. R-Type III was awarded Best Shooter of 1994 by Electronic Gaming Monthly.

In 1997, Electronic Gaming Monthly ranked the Super NES version the 23rd best console video game of all time, saying that compared to its predecessors it had virtually eliminated the slowdown, increased the difficulty, improved the graphics and sounds, and expanded the strategy by allowing the player to choose from three different Force Device units. IGN ranks it #65 on its list of the Top SNES Games of All Time. In 2018, Complex ranked the game 32nd on their "The Best Super Nintendo Games of All Time." In 1995, Total! rated the game 42nd in their Top 100 SNES Games.

=== GBA ===
The Game Boy Advance version received "generally unfavorable" reviews, holding a rating of 57.72% based on nine reviews according to review aggregators Metacritic and GameRankings.
