= R class =

R class or Class R may refer to:

== Rail transport ==
- LCDR R class, a British steam locomotive class
- NER Class R, a British steam locomotive class
- NZR R class, a type of New Zealand steam locomotive
- Rhymney Railway R class, class of tank locomotive
- South Australian Railways R class, a steam locomotive class
- Tasmanian Government Railways R class, a steam locomotive class
- Victorian Railways R class, Australian steam locomotive
- WAGR R class Australian steam locomotive
- WAGR R class (diesel), Australian diesel locomotive
- R-class Melbourne tram
- R-class Sydney tram
- R1-class Sydney tram

== Ships ==
=== Surface vessels ===
- R-class cruise ship, a cruise ship design
- R-class destroyer (1916), a series of World War I Royal Navy destroyers
- Q and R-class destroyer, Royal Navy ships launched during World War II
- R-class patrol boat, Finnish patrol boats
- Revenge-class battleship, of the Royal Navy
- Pierre Radisson-class icebreaker, of the Canadian Coast Guard; also called "R class"

=== Submarines ===
- British R-class submarine, a Royal Navy World War I submarine
- Italian R-class submarine, a large World War II Italian submarine
- Rainbow-class submarine, a Royal Navy World War II submarine
- United States R-class submarine, a type of US Navy submarine

== Other uses ==
- Mercedes-Benz R-Class, an automobile

== See also ==
- Model R (disambiguation)
- Type R (disambiguation)
- R (disambiguation)
