= Raw Danger! =

2006 video game

- Developer: Irem
- Publishers: JP: Irem (2006-2014); JP: Granzella Inc. (2014-present); NA: Agetec; EU: 505 Games
- Producer: Kazuma Kujo
- Designer: Maki D. Iguchi
- Programmer: Takada
- Composer: Tomoyuki Kawamura
- Series: Zettai Zetsumei Toshi
- Platforms: PlayStation 2, PlayStation Network
- Release: PlayStation 2: JP: March 30, 2006; EU: May 18, 2007; NA: June 12, 2007; PlayStation Network: JP: February 18, 2015
- Genre: Action-adventure
- Mode: Single-player

Raw Danger!, known in Japan as Zettai Zetsumei Toshi 2: Itetsuita Kiokutachi (絶体絶命都市2 -凍てついた記憶たち-, The Desperate City 2: Frozen Memories) is an action adventure survival game for the PlayStation 2. It was released on March 30, 2006 in Japan by Irem, and later internationally in 2007 by Agetec and 505 Games. The game follows six characters as they try to escape a city that is being flooded by torrential rains.

The game is a sequel to Disaster Report. Like the previous game in the series, Raw Danger was modified for the North American release. A further sequel, Zettai Zetsumei Toshi 3: Kowareyuku Machi to Kanojo no Uta, was released in Japan and South Korea for the PSP on April 23, 2009..

== Gameplay ==
Players must think on their feet and utilize creative survival skills to have any hope of seeing their family again. Body temperature and health decrease when players are wet or in cold weather too long. They must find places to warm themselves and gather food, and find dry clothes or make them. In the end, players must run, climb, jump, and crawl their way out of this devastated city, while constantly trying to piece together information from emergency broadcasts and other victims of the disaster.

The game is broken up into multiple chapters, each one focusing on a separate character, but choices that the players make within the game can affect the storyline and dialog of other characters, and ultimately the ending of the game itself.

== Plot ==
In December, 2010, the thriving city of Del Ray, built around the Hudson River, is preparing to commemorate the opening of Geo City, a massive underground metropolitan complex underneath Del Ray designed to be the safest and most advanced city ever built. The Mayor of Del Ray holds a conference in Geo City to celebrate its success, but several days of heavy rainfall causes Del Ray to issue a precautionary warning to evacuate after the Hudson River's water levels rise beyond cautionary levels, creating a prelude to a major disaster. The sequence of the disaster is seen through the points of view of six citizens of the city:

Kazuya Shinohara (EN: Joshua Harwell)

Joshua Harwell is part of the wait staff hosting Mayor Goldstein's conference, but the collapse of one of the levees along the Hudson river prompts the city officials to adjourn the conference and evacuate as Geo City begins flooding. Joshua escapes from Geo City with his co-worker Stephanie, and attempts to evacuate Del Ray by bus, only to be stopped by a collapsed highway, forcing them to find an alternate route. Joshua and Stephanie encounter Stephanie's stepmother Claire, whom Stephanie became estranged from after Claire accidentally donated Stephanie's late mother's dress and was seriously injured saving Stephanie from a car accident, leaving her bedridden; Claire is being looked after by circus performers taking shelter in their tent but they inform Stephanie that Claire's condition is serious and she does not have much time left. Although Stephanie makes amends with Claire before she dies, she and Joshua are forced to leave when the hydroelectric dam holding back the Hudson River collapses, flooding the area. Joshua and Stephanie make it out alive and meet Stephanie's father, who evacuates the two via his private helicopter.

Yuko Saeki (EN: Amber Brazil)

Amber Brazil is fugitive after being framed for her brother's death. Amber escapes custody when the police station collapses, but is unable to remove her handcuffs, forcing her to travel the city wearing them as she tries to discover who killed her brother and why. She meets Aidan Chase, an assistant of Mayor Goldstein, and tells him about her brother. The pair travel to the Del Ray aquarium, finding an unconscious man with a head injury. After delivering him to a rescue team (or leaving him in the aquarium) as the building collapses, they return to Amber's brother's apartment to investigate, being confronted by Del Ray Police Detective Trapp twice before Trapp is killed by falling cars during the chase. After returning to her brother's apartment, Amber discovers a music box her brother intended to give to her, and a note within saying "Cascade the guardian god of water". Amber and Aiden conclude that the note alludes to the Cascade Dam, a massive hydroelectric facility on the Hudson River. They travel to the dam, meeting a crippled reporter named Keith Helm along the way. At the dam, Amber sees a man in black who she had witnessed standing over her brother's body at the murder scene, and, believing him to be the murderer, chases him across the dam as it collapses. When Amber catches up to the man, he tells her his name is Jaden Bradford and reveals to her that he is a friend of her brother, giving her a data disk that was to be entrusted to her. However, upon showing the disk to Aiden, Aiden brandishes a knife and demands she hand over the disk, revealing himself to be the murderer of Amber's brother, as part of a cover up at the bidding of Mayor Goldstein. Aiden takes Amber hostage, but Jaden distracts Aiden long enough for Amber to escape; an avalanche triggered by the collapse pushes Aiden over the edge, where Amber may save him or allow him to fall to his death after retrieving the disk. With her name cleared, Amber watches Jaden depart as police arrive to take Aiden into custody (if saved) and escort her out of the city.

Akira Tsuge (EN: Isaac Schiller)

Isaac is a taxi driver, working on the night of the disaster. After dropping off a client at Geo City, he picks up a woman by the name of Sophia Briggs, who initially asks to be taken to the Norcal laboratory but has him first stop at the Del Ray Police Station. After narrowly avoiding an explosion (inadvertently caused by Amber Brazil as she was escaping the collapsing jail), he and Sophia continue towards Norcal. However, they are diverted when a bridge collapse causes Isaac to crash, forcing him to locate a spare tire for his taxi before they can continue; during Isaac's search, Sophia briefly converses with Jaden Bradford. At Norcal, Sophia and Isaac investigate inside, but Sophia becomes trapped in a flooding room. She sends Isaac to locate Jaden so he can override the lock on the door. Jaden agrees to help, but requests that Isaac first take him to Cascade Dam. Isaac does so, witnessing the Dam's collapses and briefly seeing Amber and Aiden's confrontation at the top before Jaden returns. Isaac takes Jaden back to Norcal where they manage to narrowly save Sophia from drowning. They hastily escape the collapsing laboratory campus as the saturated ground causes the building foundations to fail. Jaden thanks Isaac for his help, then leaves the two. Isaac delivers Sophia to her final stop and pays him for his services, but then returns and asks him for one last ride.

Kana Nishizaki (EN: Peige Meyer)

Peige is a teenage student at Del Rey high school who is suffering from bullying by fellow student Emily Rose, who threw her into a locker shortly before the disaster begins. Peige emerges from the locker hours later to find the school abandoned. As she explores the school, Peige recalls the traumatizing bullying that Emily and her friends put her under, during which time Peige can swear revenge against Emily. She eventually meets up with Kelly Austin, returning from Disaster Report and one of the school's teachers, who becomes trapped by a fallen piano. Peige attempts to rescue Kelly, but is harassed by another schoolteacher, Gary Savage, who has apparently gone insane and chases Peige, trying to bring her to "detention." After escaping Gary and rescuing Kelly, Peige learns that other students and staff are taking shelter in the school gym until a rescue helicopter can evacuate them. They are confronted by Savage again, who once more attempts to catch Peige, but Savage falls to his death during the chase. At the gym, they find the principal of the school with a doctor by the name of Spritz. The principal appears to be suffering from some kind of sickness, but Spritz says he cannot leave, as he is waiting for someone to deliver an object of importance to them. That night, Emily wakes Peige up, requesting her help; regardless of whether Peige helps or refuses, she encounters a man and a woman before going to the roof to board the evacuation helicopter with Emily. As they are about to board, the collapsing building causes Emily to lose her footing and nearly fall from the ledge, at which point Peige can either allow her to die or help her up, reconciling and boarding the rescue helicopter with her.

Yuuji Hayami (EN: Ivan Koslov)

Ivan, who turns out to be the injured man whom Aidan and Amber encountered in the aquarium earlier, awakens either in a medical shelter (if rescued by Aidan) or outside the flooded aquarium (if left behind), with no memories of his name or past. He meets a woman named Sierra, who Ivan assists in investigating the apartment of her murdered boyfriend David, who was also Amber Brazil's brother. Ivan finds no clues to his past at the apartment, but the two then encounter Doctor Spritz, who tells Ivan that David was his former lab partner. Spritz then beseeches Ivan to destroy something code-named "Echidna", which could kill thousands if unleashed in Del Ray. Ivan goes to his old apartment to try to find more clues, at which point he recalls that he and David were one of the scientists working on Echidna, which is revealed to be a deadly and highly contagious biological weapon. Ivan and Sierra meet Doctor Spritz at Del Ray high school, but he collapses as he is revealed to have been afflicted with Echidna, but manages to tell Ivan that Echidna can be destroyed with electricity before dying. Ivan and Sierra locate a large container filled with Echidna at the high school, but the floodwaters and unstable ground causes it to float away, forcing the two to give chase. They manage to secure the container and Ivan prepares to use downed discharge wires from an electrical substation to destroy Echidna, but he is confronted by Mayor Goldstein, who says his true identity is "Mr. Apolon", a former resident of a village that was destroyed during Del Ray's initial construction. As revenge, Goldstein worked his way into Del Ray's government, intentionally sabotaging the dam and levee construction to engineer the disaster, so that he may release Echidna in the chaos to kill the victims still trapped in the city; Ivan and David were two of the top scientists assigned to the project, but David developed a guilty conscience and wanted to release evidence of the Mayor's plan to the authorities, prompting Goldstein to have him killed. Goldstein orders Ivan to stand down, and Ivan may either obey, abandoning Sierra, or refuse and attempt to destroy Echidna. If Ivan resolves to destroy Echidna, Goldstein shoots him, and Ivan, mortally wounded, uses the last of his strength to crawl through the floodwaters and connect the electrical cables, destroying Echidna before being executed by an enraged Goldstein, thus saving the city from Echidna. Sierra is last seen crying, either from being abandoned by Ivan or mourning his death.

Masayuki Sudo (EN: Keith Helm)

Keith is the last character to be played in the game, and will only be playable under certain circumstances. Crippled due to unknown circumstances after Disaster Report, he walks with a crutch and briefly encounters several other characters before appearing in the final chapter of the game. After being approached by Isaac and Sophia, who pass him information that Sophia was able to retrieve from the Norcal Laboratory, he stays behind to continue gathering information, which is revealed to be evidence of Echidna and Goldstein's plot against the city. He narrowly escapes as his building begins to flood, climbing to the same tower where Joshua and Stephanie are evacuating from via helicopter if the player is not Keith; Keith or Joshua will retrieve the evidence from Jaden depending on whether the player fully completed Joshua's chapter. The collapsing tower suddenly shifts, forcing Keith to hold onto the radio antenna; If Sophia survived Isaac's chapter, she and Isaac will rescue Keith by helicopter, and Keith will look out over the sinking city as he departs, reflecting on its fate.

== Connectivity ==
This game is able to interface with the Konami Para Para Paradise controller. This allows the player to design their own hand movements to be used when summoning rescuers. Players may also use the controller to simulate the "fireman carry", used to move unconscious characters.

== Reception ==
Reception

Aggregate score
Aggregator	Score
Metacritic	63/100

Review scores
Publication	Score
Edge	7/10
Eurogamer	6/10
Famitsu	28/40
Game Informer	4.5/10
GamePro	2.75/5
GameSpot	6.7/10
GameSpy	2/5
GameZone	7.5/10
IGN	7.5/10
PlayStation: The Official Magazine	5.5/10
The New York Times	(favorable)

The game received "mixed" reviews according to the review aggregation website Metacritic. In Japan, Famitsu gave it a score of all four sevens for a total of 28 out of 40.
