= R-Type II =

1989 video game

- Japanese arcade flyer by Takashi Yamasaki
- Developer: Irem
- Publisher: Irem
- Artist: Akio
- Series: R-Type
- Platforms: Arcade, Amiga, Atari ST, Game Boy, iOS, Android
- Release: November 1989: Arcade; JP: November 1989; EU: December 1989; NA: April 1990 Amiga; EU: June 1991 Atari ST; EU: 1991 Game Boy; JP: December 11, 1992; EU: 1992 iOS, Android; WW: February 13, 2014
- Genre: Scrolling shooter
- Modes: Single-player, multiplayer
- Arcade system: Irem M-84 hardware

R-Type II (Note: Japanese: アール・タイプII, Hepburn: Āru Taipu Tsū) is a 1989 horizontally scrolling shooter video game developed and published by Irem for arcades. It is the sequel to 1987's R-Type, and the second game in the R-Type series.

== Gameplay ==
Arcade screenshot, the R-9C approaches the level 1 Boss

The player controls a ship called the R-9C, which is an improved version of its predecessor game's ship, the R-9. The ship's design was changed slightly, and the Wave Cannon is given a new charge level. Two new types of weapons (the Search Laser and Shotgun Laser) were added, bringing the total number of weapon types up to five. A new anti-ground unit bomb was added to the missile inventory.

Though the number of levels was decreased from the previous game, the number of enemies, their durability, and the number of bullets they shoot were greatly increased. Enemy movements and terrain were also made trickier, bringing the game's difficulty up considerably. The same revival system is used as in R-Type, where the player is brought back to a checkpoint whenever their ship is destroyed.

The game consists of six levels. Though an ending screen is displayed after the player finishes all of the levels once through, the game's true ending is only displayed after the player completes the levels a second time under increased difficulty. The game starts off in a ruined Bydo base, and continues through a giant cave where waterfalls can prevent the ship from progressing. The player battles several huge battleships in the third level, and the terrain constantly shifts around during the fourth and fifth levels. The final level takes place on the Bydo home planet, where the alien organisms are cloned and mass-produced.

== Ports ==
R-Type II did not receive any home console ports until 1998, after it had become a retro game; R-Type II for the PC Engine is actually the second half of the original R-Type, while Super R-Type, released in 1991 for the Super Nintendo Entertainment System, is only a semi-port of R-Type II. About half of the levels in Super R-Type were newly created, but some are arranged versions of the levels in R-Type II. The game was released for the Wii Virtual Console on January 29, 2008.

R-Type II for the Amiga is a downgraded though faithful conversion of the original arcade game. It was positively received by magazine critics of the time garnering praise for its accuracy. It was converted by Arc Developments and the graphics were hand-created pixel-by-pixel by in-house graphic artist Jon Harrison. It is missing all the new weapons (search laser, shotgun laser, scatter bomb) and the helper bits have no firing capability. The same goes for the Atari ST version, which misses much gfx and any parallax, but the gameplay and level design remain as faithful to the original as the Amiga version.

The game was also ported to the Game Boy, but the limitations of the hardware caused the content to be changed considerably. The Game Boy version contains only 5 levels, and some of the boss names were changed as well.

The game is coupled with its forerunner in R-Types, which was released for the PlayStation in 1998. This was followed by downloadable releases for the PlayStation Portable and PlayStation 3 over the PlayStation Network. R-Types includes a new opening and ending movie animation, along with "R's Library", which documents some of the game's design settings. A promotional movie for R-Type Delta is included in this release.

Tozai Games ported R-Type II, along with the original R-Type, to the Xbox 360's downloadable service Xbox Live Arcade as R-Type Dimensions in 2009. It is also playable on the Xbox One via backwards compatibility. The title was ported to the PlayStation 3 in 2014. Tozai Games returned in 2018 and issued the collection digitally as R-Type Dimensions EX, on Microsoft Windows (via Steam), PlayStation 4, and Nintendo Switch. Strictly Limited Games released physical copies of the PlayStation 4 and Switch versions in February 2019. These were limited to 2,000 and 3,000 copies respectively. Collector's Edition variants were issued which contained a hardcover artbook, dog tags, stickers and cards, once again limited to 1,000 on the PlayStation 4 and 2,000 on the Switch.

== Reception ==
Arcade reviews

Review scores
Publication	Score
Crash	Positive
Computer and Video Games	92%
Your Sinclair	93%
Zero	5/5 stars
Zzap!64	Positive
Commodore User	86%

Award
Publication	Award
Gamest Awards	Best Graphics

The arcade game was successful in Japan, where Game Machine listed it as the second most successful table arcade game of December 1989.

The arcade game was critically acclaimed. Commodore User reviewed the arcade game, giving it an 86% score.
