= R-Type Leo =

1992 video game

- Developer: Nanao
- Publisher: Irem
- Designer: Atsushi Inaba
- Composer: Hiroshi Kimura
- Series: R-Type
- Platform: Arcade
- Release: WW: November 1992
- Genre: Horizontal-scrolling shooter
- Modes: Single-player, multiplayer
- Arcade system: Irem M-92

R-Type Leo (Note: Japanese: アールタイプ・レオ, Hepburn: Āru Taipu Reo) is a 1992 horizontal-scrolling shooter arcade game developed by Nanao and published by Irem. It is a spin-off of the R-Type series and the last R-Type entry to be released in arcades. In Leo, players take control of the titular space fighter to travel the man-made mechanical planet Eden and destroy its supercomputer core Major. The game was initially conceived as an original shoot 'em up by Nanao before being retooled into an R-Type project by Irem. The title was met with positive reception from reviewers. It has since been re-released as part of Dotemu's 2010 Irem Arcade Hits compilation.

== Gameplay ==
Gameplay screenshot

R-Type Leo is a horizontal-scrolling shooter that is part of the R-Type series. The plot involves a man-made mechanical planet named Eden, which after its supercomputer core called Major begins to malfunction, uses its defense systems and machines to destroy what is left of mankind. In response, a starfighter named the Leo is deployed to destroy Eden. Leo features gameplay similar to its predecessors; the player (or players) flies through each stage, destroying constantly-moving formations of enemies and avoiding their projectiles and stage obstacles. There are six stages total, which become progressively more difficult as the player progresses. Stages include deserts, tropical jungles, and abandoned space battleships. Each stage also has a massive boss that must be defeated by destroying its weak point.

Leo features multiple deviations from the R-Type gameplay structure. The most notable change is the removal of the Force, a shield item from previous installments that also acted as an additional source of firepower. The player is instead given two Psy-Bit satellites that follow them and fire at enemies. There are power-ups that can be collected to grant the Leo access to new weapons. Weapon types include a powerful laser beam, a homing shot, and a laser that reflects off of walls.

== Development and release ==
R-Type Leo was initially an original shoot 'em up game in development by Nanao before Irem retooled it into an R-Type project instead. Atsushi Inaba, currently of PlatinumGames, was involved in the development of the project before joining Nazca Corporation with other ex-Irem members. The game was first released in arcades in November 1992, running on the Irem M-92 board. In a 2019 interview, M2 CEO Naoki Horii stated that the company wanted to develop a Sega Mega Drive version of Leo but the plan was rejected by Sega. The title was later re-released in 2010 as part of Dotemu's Irem Arcade Hits compilation for Microsoft Windows.

== Reception ==
Reception

Award
Publication	Award
Gamest Mook (1998)	Best Shooting Award 5th Annual Hit Game 22nd

R-Type Leo was met with positive reception from reviewers since its release in arcades. Gamest also gave it several awards for the 6th Gamest Grand Prize. Leo won 5th place in the Best Shooting Award and 22nd place in the Annual Hit Game award. Electronic Gaming Monthly praised the inclusion of cooperative multiplayer, visuals, sound design, gameplay and bosses. In Japan, Game Machine listed the game on their February 1, 1993 issue as being the eighteenth most popular arcade game at the time. French magazine Joypad praised the graphics and music highly. Consoles + regarded the title as an "excellent shooting game". Andreas Kanuf of German magazine Video Games gave it an overall positive outlook. Retro Gamer regarded it to be an acceptable addition to the R-Type series. Kurt Kalata of Hardcore Gaming 101 praised its visuals and sound design but noted the lack of "careful design and required strategy" from previous R-Type entries. Metal Slug co-designer Kazuma Kujo regarded Leo to be "quite innovative for an R-Type game, and it was well done for a shooter, but it doesn't quite feel like an R-Type game".
