= Disaster Report 4 Plus: Summer Memories =

2018 video game

- Developer: Granzella
- Publisher: NIS America: JP: Granzella
- Producer: Kazuma Kujo
- Composer: Yuka Kitamura
- Series: Disaster Report
- Engine: Unreal Engine 4
- Platforms: PlayStation 4; Nintendo Switch; Windows
- Release: PlayStation 4: JP: November 22, 2018; WW: April 7, 2020; Nintendo Switch: JP: September 26, 2019; WW: April 7, 2020; Windows: WW: April 7, 2020
- Genre: Action-adventure
- Mode: Single-player

Disaster Report 4 Plus: Summer Memories (Note: Known in Japan as Zettai Zetsumei Toshi 4 Plus: Summer Memories (絶体絶命都市4 Plus -Summer Memories-)) is an action-adventure video game developed and published by Granzella for the PlayStation 4. Released in 2018 in Japan, it is the fourth entry in the Disaster Report series. It was originally meant to be released for the PlayStation 3 by Irem, but was cancelled in 2011 after the Tōhoku earthquake and tsunami in March of the same year; development resumed in 2014 for the PlayStation 4 after Granzella acquired the intellectual property of the franchise from Irem.

A Nintendo Switch version was released in September 2019 in Japan and a Windows port was released in April 2020, with all platforms also receiving an international release by NIS America on the same day.

== Gameplay ==
The goal is to escape the destroyed city, finding safe paths through collapsing buildings and dealing with panicked and fleeing people.

The game was to feature over 60 characters, the largest in series history. The player would have had to work with these people to escape.

There are a few new features Irem highlights for Disaster Report 4:

- The player can enter collapsed buildings, within which the player will find survivors and additional escape routes.
- The game has a new "cleanliness" parameter for the character. If the character gets too dirty, stress will rise.
- The player can use the toilet to increase the main character's cleanliness parameter.

The player is free to customize the main character. At the start of the game, the player can set the main character's gender, face style, and hair style. Over 100 clothing items, including suits and casual outfits can be earned as the player works through the game.

== Story ==
The game takes place in Hisui City in the year 201X. It is July, the heart of summer, and the main character is visiting the city for a job interview. The city is suddenly hit with a major earthquake, which causes the bus they are riding on to crash and stranding them in the city.

The protagonist escapes from the wrecked bus and gets their bearings, meeting several residents of the city: Ms. Higa, a schoolteacher assigned to three highschool students who were caught in the earthquake, Tomoya, who was attacked by a "scary-looking man" and whom tasks the protagonist with retrieving a box from his locker in the Hisui City underground metro, Yayoi, a young woman who, like the protagonist, was caught in the earthquake while attending a job interview, and Mr. Kirishima, the president of the struggling IT company Vestola. After retrieving the item from Tomoya's locker, they rescue a young woman named Kanae and escape a pair of drunken thugs. Kanae suggests they travel together to Hisui's ferry terminal, where evacuations are proceeding. As they arrive, they find the ferry is overloaded and unable to accept more passengers, but Kanae states that she must meet her boyfriend, revealed to be Tomoya, there. However, the aftershocks of the earthquake and extreme soil liquefaction causes the terminal to begin to collapse, so the pair flee in a lifeboat to a flooded apartment complex and rest for the night, and Kanae convinces the protagonist to help her find Tomoya.

The pair awaken to the apartment building collapsing, and narrowly escape back to their raft. After making it to dry land, they go back into the city, once again crossing paths with Kirishima, learning that the source of Vestola's struggles is their rival company Kerberos taking advantage of the chaos to spread rumors about Vestola. Kanae and the protagonist eventually meet Tomoya again, who reveals he is assisting with recovery and evacuation efforts in the city, and proposes to Kanae, who accepts. Electing to stay with Tomoya to help with recovery, Kanae wishes the protagonist luck, and the protagonist continues to search for a way out of the city. After briefly becoming inducted into, then ousted by, a cult which had been defrauding citizens of their money in exchange for shelter, the protagonist flees into the residential district and volunteers to assist an elderly woman locate a doctor; the local hospital is overcrowded, but they manage to find medical assistance at a nearby elementary school that had been turned into an evacuation shelter. They meet a foreign exchange student named Danny, but the two find that most of the Hisui city citizens at the shelter distrust them, leaving them unable to find food or water; the protagonist's attempts to assist by providing tap water in a novelty water bottle causes the citizens to believe the water to be a "miracle cure", but are angered when they discover it only to be regular drinking water, and force Danny and the protagonist out of the shelter.

The protagonist arrives at a burned down shopping plaza, where they meet Tomoya again, still assisting with recovery efforts. They also cross paths with the "scary looking man" once more, who is apparently following Tomoya for an unknown purpose. After assisting the citizens at the plaza, they return to Kanae, who informs the protagonist that an evacuation plane is flying citizens out of the city at the airport, and gives them a ticket. As they go to the airport, the protagonist encounters Ms. Higa again, but they discover one of her students, Hiroko, is attempting suicide due to repeated bullying from her classmates. Ms. Higa rescues Hiroko, but falls to her death.

The protagonist continues towards the airport, meeting Yayoi again, but discovers she was sexually assaulted and traumatized by the drunken thugs from the metro. They then discover that another, larger evacuation shelter has been established near the city center, and the protagonist may choose between going to the airport with Yayoi or journey alone to the city center.

If they decide to go to the city center, they discover the area already flooded with citizens, desperate for aid. The situation is exacerbated when the Hisui City Hall's power is restored, despite the majority of the city still being without power. The protagonist gets caught up in a mass of citizens flooding into the city hall to demand answers from the city administration. As the crowd corners the mayor on the roof of the building, another aftershock causes the protagonist to lose balance, but they are rescued from falling by Kumazawa, an unscrupulous entrepreneur whom the protagonist had encountered in the city previously.

If the protagonist travels to the airport with Yayoi, they meet Kanae at a rest stop just before the airport bridge, and the three embark with the last group of refugees to the airport. However, upon arrival it is revealed that the evacuation plan is actually a ruse by "Snake Snake", a human trafficking syndicate which is taking advantage of the disaster to capture refugees to sell into slavery; Tomoya, whose actual name is "Keith", reveals himself to be a high-ranking member of the syndicate, having faked his identity and relationship with Kanae to gain her trust and integrate into Hisui City's population, and has the protagonist, Kanae, Yayoi, and the rest of the refugees imprisoned in their ship. The protagonist manages to slip their bonds, and, using an improvised bomb, frees the other refugees and destroys the ship during their escape. Keith confronts the protagonist on the docks and attempts to shoot them, but he is stopped by the "scary looking man", actually an undercover police detective, who arrives with backup to arrest Keith and the rest of "Snake Snake." After the rescue, a helicopter arrives to evacuate the refugees, and the protagonist may either evacuate with Yayoi, or return to the city with Kanae to assist with rebuilding efforts.

== Development ==
The game was originally being developed and published by Irem for the PlayStation 3, it would have supported 3D output and PlayStation Move. Initially, the game was planned for release on March 10, 2011, a day before the 2011 Tōhoku earthquake and tsunami, but was pushed back to a Spring time frame. Chief producer, Kazuma Kujo said the reason for the delay was because the game could not be completed in time. The game was officially cancelled on March 14, 2011.

In December 2014, Kujo revealed that his new company, Granzella, had acquired the intellectual property of the Disaster Report series; they planned to formally announce the game in Q3/Q4 2015. The new game was eventually announced in November 2015 with the title Disaster Report 4 Plus: Summer Memories. It is being developed for PlayStation 4. Kujo has also stated the re-branded title started development from scratch. A PlayStation VR demo was planned to be released in January 2017 but was postponed to be released after February 2017. A non-public VR Demo was shown to a Japanese video game magazine in December 2016 and produced quite positive reactions from the testers. The game was released on October 25, 2018, in Japan. The game's release was delayed and the new release date was announced to be on November 22, 2018.

The Kobe Fire Bureau worked with Granzella to showcase the KFD's work in what civilians should do in case they're caught up in a disaster.

It was announced that the game would see a release with Traditional Chinese language support, which was released on October 29, 2019, by Just Dan. For its Korean release on August 8, 2019, Digital Touch collaborated with Granzella to work on translating the game in Korean.

On June 20, 2019, NIS America announced their plans to localize the game in both North America and Europe. On January 7, 2020, they announced that the game will release for North America and Europe on April 7, 2020.

In the end, the VR mode only allows to play selected areas and only after they have been cleared already in regular mode.

== Reception ==
Reception

Aggregate score
Aggregator	Score
Metacritic	NS: 59/100; PC: 58/100; PS4: 51/100

Review scores
Publication	Score
Electronic Gaming Monthly	2/5
Nintendo Life	6/10
Push Square	3/10
USgamer	2/5

The game received mixed reviews. On review aggregator Metacritic, all versions of the game received "mixed or average reviews". The Nintendo Switch version received an average score of 59 out of 100, the PC version 58 out of 100, and the PlayStation 4 version 51/100.

The game debuted at 3rd place in the top 20 games sold with 42,272 copies sold as of November 25, 2018.

It was reported on December 5, 2018, that the game sold a total of 47,483 copies.

== Sequel ==
In November 2018, game director Kazuma Kujo mentioned that a sequel was being considered, and in December 2020, Granzella published a teaser indicating that planning and prototyping of Disaster Report 5 had begun.

In a livestream in March 2022, Kujo announced that the game will be an open world-based game, set three years after the first game.

== See also ==
- Impact of the 2011 Tōhoku earthquake and tsunami on the video game industry
