= Super R-Type =

1991 video game

- North American cover art
- Developer: Irem
- Publishers: JP/NA: Irem; EU: Nintendo
- Composers: Yasuhiro Kawakami; Takushi Hiyamuta; Hiroshi Kimura
- Series: R-Type
- Platform: Super NES
- Release: JP: July 13, 1991; NA: September 1991; EU: June 4, 1992; BR: December 1993
- Genre: Scrolling shooter
- Mode: Single-player

Super R-Type (Note: Japanese: スーパーR-Type, Hepburn: Sūpā Āru Taipu) is a scrolling shooter video game developed and published by Irem for the Super Nintendo Entertainment System. It was released in Japan and North America in 1991, Europe in 1992, and Brazil in 1993 by Nintendo. It is a partial port of R-Type II, borrowing stages and enemies, but introducing several of its own. The game has been re-released on the Wii Virtual Console in 2008, and on the Nintendo Classics service in 2024.

== Gameplay ==
Super R-Type borrows four stages from R-Type II and adds three new ones. The game is known for its high difficulty (even compared to other games in the series), particularly because of its lack of checkpoints, since dying means restarting the level from scratch. Also, this game suffers from slowdown, which was also a problem in many early games for this system. But unlike the others Super R-Type slows down to a virtual standstill when there are many things on-screen. However, this proved useful for players when there were many obstacles on-screen because it was easier to avoid them.

== Reception ==
Reception

Review scores
Publication	Score
ACE	890/1000
Computer and Video Games	91/100
Electronic Gaming Monthly	8/10, 8/10, 8/10, 8/10
Famitsu	28/40
Game Informer	7/10
Games-X	4/5
Raze	77/100
Super Play	72%
Total!	(UK) 71%, (DE) 2-
Zero	91/100
Control	77%
Game Boy	4/5, 3/5, 5/5, 4/5, 5/5
Game Zone	90/100
Hippon Super!	7/10
Mean Machines	90%
N-Force	87%
SNES Force	83%
Super Action	81%
The Super Famicom	B
Super Gamer	74%
Super Pro	78/100

According to Famitsu, Super R-Type sold 109,120 copies in its first week on the market and 190,374 copies during its lifetime in Japan. The Japanese publication Micom BASIC Magazine ranked the game eighth in popularity in its October 1991 issue, and it received a 22.1/30 score in a readers' poll conducted by Super Famicom Magazine. It also garnered generally favorable reception from critics.

Entertainment Weekly's Bob Strauss picked the game as the second greatest game available in 1991, saying: "The space-shooting R-Type game has been evolving over the last several years; this latest incarnation is the most graphically overpowering yet. Players pilot a ship through the deep cosmos, picking up various supercharged weapons along the way and squaring off against some extraordinarily detailed aliens, which look like illustrations from classic pulp sci-fi magazines of the 1930s". Super Gamer stated that "It looks brilliant and plays well, but while graphical slowdown isn't that bad, going back to the start of the level whenever you die soon becomes tedious".

== Re-releases ==
On March 14, 2008, the game was released on the Wii Virtual Console service in Europe and Australia. The game was made available on the Virtual Console in North America on March 17, 2008. However, it was removed from the Virtual Console on March 30, 2012, in North America and on March 31, 2012, in Europe. The game was re-released on the Nintendo Classics service on April 12, 2024.

Legacy games company Retro-Bit released a SNES-compatible cartridge including the game alongside R-Type III: The Third Lightning in July 2018.
