= R-Type Tactics II: Operation Bitter Chocolate =

2009 video game

- Japanese cover art
- Developer: Irem
- Publisher: Irem
- Designer: Kazuma Kujo
- Composer: Yuki Iwai
- Series: R-Type
- Platform: PlayStation Portable
- Release: JP: December 10, 2009
- Genre: Turn-based strategy
- Modes: Single-player, multiplayer

R-Type Tactics II: Operation Bitter Chocolate (Note: Japanese: アール・タイプタクティクスツー -オペレーションビターチョコレート-, Hepburn: Āru-Taipu Takutikusu Tsū: Operēshon Bitā Chokorēto) is a turn-based strategy tactical role-playing game released in 2009 in Japan for the PlayStation Portable game console. It is the sequel to 2007's R-Type Tactics. The main part of the game consists of three campaigns, in which the player controls two human factions, then the Bydo Empire.

A remake of both R-Type Tactics games, titled R-Type Tactics I • II Cosmos, is in development at Granzella. It's set to be released in late 2025 for Nintendo Switch, PlayStation 4, PlayStation 5, Windows, and Xbox Series X/S, and marks the first time the game is available outside Japan. This remake also adds a new third campaign to the Tactics II story mode.

== Gameplay ==
Bitter Chocolate features the player as they navigates a fleet of space fighters and support units, as one of three factions - the Earth Allied Armed Forces (EAAF; an evolution of the Earth Space Corps in the first game), the Bydo Empire, and a new human faction called the Granzella Revolutionary Army (GZRA). The side-scrolling nature of R-Type Command's gameplay is retained in the sequel. Most levels are structured as in a side-scrolling shooter, with the player's units and the objective on opposite sides of the field. Units cannot change the direction they are facing, which has an important impact on gameplay, as certain attacks can only be performed in one direction. Although certain missions have the player's units facing right, there are missions in both Human and Bydo campaigns where they will face left. Players can also earn veterancy levels, which improve their units' hit points or evasion levels.

Like other turn-based strategy games, the playing field is also divided into hexagons with varying effects. The game maps are also larger than those found in the first game, with some levels encompassing behemoth space facilities. Some stages are also vertically scrolling.

Players can also customize their avatars under a new profiling system and can also interlink with their old profiles from the first game. The profile from the first game represents the Bydo commander who was forced to leave Earth for good at the end of Tactics. The player will assume this profile when the Bydo campaign is unlocked. However, players with profiles in R-Type Tactics (not Command) can take advantage of this feature. The game also features branching mission paths that can be unlocked based on choices listed in the player's journal. The missions on the other path would be available when the player completes a campaign chapter.

=== Units ===
R-Type Tactics II offers more than 200 different units, including many of the R-series fighters from the other R-Type games such as R-Type Final, plus units from other Irem games such as the Granvia-F submarine from In the Hunt. Each fighter has unique abilities such as sub-space movement (called "desynching") and a distinct set of attacks. During the game, the player acquires abilities enabling new units and upgrades to existing units to be purchased for their army. Furthermore, new units can be acquired by capturing certain objectives in levels, such as derelict space stations and starbases. The unit's development can also be tracked through a special technology tree. More powerful versions of unlockable units in the game are also available as downloadable content from the PlayStation Network, but unlike the other units, the player can only acquire one of each.

Support units range from large carrier ships to maintenance units as well as the Force pods.

Force units can either be controlled separately or they can be attached to fighter craft. Attached Forces function as a unidirectional shield while providing the fighter with stronger attacks. When not attached, a Force is an independent unit that can be used as a tank.

Aside from mining Solomonadium, Etherium, and Bydolgen, the Rr2o-3 is also capable of building a space station on certain stages featuring core blocks, though at a cost of Solomonadium mined on the spot. The kinds of modules that can be assembled include expansion conduits, docking bays, missile and laser turrets, fixed Wave Cannon turrets, and radar stations. The player can assemble up to 30 modules per stage. Once a core block has been destroyed, the entire station complex is destroyed as well.

The EAAF's arsenal comprises most of the Force-capable R-series fighters seen in the history of the franchise. The Granzella Revolutionary Army (GZRA) has only one fighter with a Force system (the R-90 Ragnarok and the non-Bydo-based Shadow Force, respectively), but have jamming support, which can mask units under a fog of war. Sonar can also be used to uncover "desynched" units without having to bump into them during a turn. Regardless of what faction the player starts with, most of the other faction's units can be unlocked later in the game. The player can also exit the mission without having finished it and retain whatever bonus boxes recovered in the level.

The player's alter ego is the main character, which can be designed according to gender, birthplace, and favorite food and color. The main character's voice can be heard in the journal entries, which also have choices that can affect the campaign and determine the player's rating in a special profile graph. The male character is voiced by Tetsu Inada while the female character is voiced by Yukie Maeda. The assistants are still available in the Bydo campaign, but no voice options are available for the main character in the journal.

=== Multiplayer ===
The game also supports multiplayer combat via Wi-Fi and also has a co-operative two-player mode available through ad hoc connection and game sharing modes.

== Plot ==
The game is set in MC 0074, nine years after the events of Tactics. The Space Corps has successfully fought off the invasion of the Bydo Empire and peace has reigned. However, tension rises when the EAAF resists calls to demobilize and scrap much of its Force-based arsenal as the Bydo no longer pose a threat. Fed up with the EAAF's defiance, a faction based in Mars called the Granzella Revolutionary Army declares war on Earth and attracts many people to their cause.

== Release ==
=== Demo ===
Irem released two demos of the game, with one demo sampling the EAF and the other for the GZRA. Both contain three stages each, with one of them a remake of a classic R-Type stage featuring the boss Dobkeratops.

=== Full version ===
As a pre-order bonus, a soundtrack disc was included. No announcements have been made for a release outside Japan. In June 2010, an English version of the game was rated by the ESRB with Irem listed as the publisher, but no official announcement was ever made and the game was never released. In 2018, a fan produced translation was made available.

In the PlayStation 3's community-based social gaming network, PlayStation Home, Irem has released a Game Space in the Japanese Home on December 3, 2009, to promote the release of R-Type Tactics II: Operation Bitter Chocolate on the PSP and PSPgo. This is the first PSP title to receive a PlayStation Home Game Space.

== Reception ==
Reception

Review score
Publication	Score
Famitsu	30/40
