= Granzella =

Japanese video game developer

Granzella Inc.
- Native name: 株式会社グランゼーラ
- Romanized name: Kabushiki gaisha Guranzeera
- Company type: Kabushiki gaisha
- Industry: Video games
- Founded: April 2011; 15 years ago
- Headquarters: Nonoichi, Ishikawa Prefecture, Japan
- Website: granzella.co.jp

Granzella Inc. is a Japanese video game developer based in Ishikawa. The company is formed from former Irem staff and engaged in planning, production and sales of console games. The company is known for developing the latest entry in the Disaster Report and R-Type series. Granzella was established in April 2011 by former staff of Irem Software Engineering Inc. (hereafter referred as Irem) after the cancellation of multiple video game projects as a result of the 2011 Tōhoku earthquake and tsunami. The name of the company is derived from "Granzella Revolution Army," which appeared in R-Type Tactics II: Operation Bitter Chocolate, a game from the R-Type series developed by the staff at Irem.

== History ==
After the company's establishment, Granzella mainly focused on developing content for PlayStation Home. On June 30, 2014, the company was split into two business divisions: "Granzella Inc." which focused on visuals and "Granzella Overseas Entertainment Inc." which focused on developing games for Western audiences and smartphones.

In December 2014, Granzella acquired IP and distribution rights of the Disaster Report series in all areas of the world, including future titles, from Irem. The company then announced the restart of development work for Disaster Report 4 Plus: Summer Memories, which was previously in limbo after Irem halted development of the game, and began distribution of previous titles through downloadable services and arcades.

In September 2015, the company announced a joint project with Bandai Namco Entertainment, which eventually became City Shrouded in Shadow. The game was described as a spiritual successor to the Disaster Report series. In November of that year, the company announced the establishment of Gz Studios, a video game development studio, and Granzella Music, a music sub-label.

In August 2019, Gz Studios was renamed to Granzella Game Studios.

== Games developed by Granzella ==
Title	Platform(s)	Release date	Publisher(s)	JP	NA	EU	AUS
Soccer Love	Android, iOS	March 30, 2017	Granzella	Yes	No	No	No
City Shrouded in Shadow	PlayStation 4	October 19, 2017	Bandai Namco Entertainment	Yes	No	No	No
Manga Kakeru	PlayStation Vita	January 26, 2018	Granzella	Yes	No	No	No
Manga Kakeru	PlayStation 4	June 19, 2018	Granzella	Yes	No	No	No
Hototogisu Tairan 1553: Ryuuko Aiutsu	Nintendo Switch	April 26, 2018	Granzella	Yes	No	No	No
Disaster Report 4 Plus: Summer Memories	PlayStation 4	October 25, 2018	Granzella, NIS America	Yes	Yes	Yes	Yes
Disaster Report 4 Plus: Summer Memories	Nintendo Switch	September 26, 2019	Granzella, NIS America	Yes	Yes	Yes	Yes
Disaster Report 4 Plus: Summer Memories	Windows	April 7, 2020	NIS America	Yes	Yes	Yes	Yes
R-Type Final 2	Nintendo Switch, PlayStation 4, Windows, Xbox One, Xbox Series X/S	April 29, 2021	Granzella, NIS America	Yes	Yes	Yes	Yes
R-Type Final 3 Evolved	PlayStation 5 (Note: R-Type Final 3 content is also planned for release as a free update to R-Type Final 2.)	March 23, 2023	Granzella, NIS America	Yes	Yes	Yes	Yes
Side View Golf	Nintendo Switch	July 6, 2023	Granzella	Yes	Yes	Yes	Yes
R-Type Tactics I • II Cosmos	Nintendo Switch, Nintendo Switch 2, PlayStation 4, PlayStation 5, Windows, Xbox Series X/S	2026	Granzella, NIS America	Yes	Yes	Yes	Yes
FZ: Formation Z	Nintendo Switch 2, PlayStation 5, Windows, Xbox Series X/S	2026	City Connection	Yes	Yes	Yes	Yes
Disaster Report 5	TBA	TBA	Granzella	Yes	TBA	TBA	TBA
