= R-Type =

1987 video game

- Japanese arcade flyer
- Developer: Irem (Note: Master System version developed by Compile)
- Publishers: JP: Irem; NA: Nintendo; EU: Electrocoin
- Producer: Kinte
- Designer: Abiko
- Programmers: Sum; Misachin
- Artists: Akio Oyabu; Yoshige
- Composer: Masato Ishizaki
- Series: R-Type
- Platform: Arcade: TurboGrafx-16, Atari ST, Commodore 64, ZX Spectrum, Master System, PC-88, MSX2, X68000, Amiga, Amstrad CPC, Game Boy, Super CD-ROM², Game Boy Color, mobile phone, iOS, Android
- Release: May 15, 1987: Arcade; JP: May 15, 1987; EU: July 1987; NA: October 1987 TurboGrafx-16; JP: March 25, 1988 (part 1); JP: June 3, 1988 (part 2); NA: November 1989 Atari ST, C64, ZX Spectrum; EU: September 1988 Master System; JP: October 1, 1988; NA: December 1988; EU: 1989 PC-88; JP: October 1988 MSX2; JP: December 9, 1988 X68000; JP: June 9, 1989 Amiga, CPC; EU: 1989 Game Boy; JP: March 19, 1991; NA: May 1991; EU: 1991 Super CD-ROM²; JP: December 20, 1991 Game Boy Color; NA: June 28, 1999; EU: July 20, 1999; JP: November 12, 1999 Mobile; EU: 2007 iOS; WW: August 26, 2010 Android; WW: September 12, 2011
- Genre: Scrolling shooter
- Modes: Single-player, multiplayer
- Arcade system: Irem M72

R-Type (Note: Japanese: アール・タイプ, Hepburn: Āru Taipu) is a 1987 horizontally scrolling shooter developed and published by Irem as an arcade video game. The player controls the R-9 "Arrowhead" starship in its efforts to destroy the Bydo, a powerful alien race bent on wiping out all of mankind. The R-9 can acquire a glowing orb called a "Force", giving limited protection from enemy fire and providing additional firepower.

R-Type was the first game to run on Irem's 16-bit M72 arcade system. The development team drew inspiration from Gradius, Aliens, and works by H.R. Giger. The music was composed by Masato Ishizaki, while character designs were by Akio Oyabu. The arcade version was distributed in North America by Nintendo, and was the last arcade title to be released by the company.

R-Type was commercially successful and praised by critics for its graphics and addictive gameplay, but was criticized for its difficulty. It is commonly cited as one of the best shoot 'em up games, and one of the greatest video games of all time. Its success inspired several sequels and spin-off games, as well as home ports and releases for digital distribution services. A remake of the game was released as R-Type DX for the Game Boy Color in 2000. A 3D remake, R-Type Dimensions, was released for the Xbox 360 in 2009; for the PlayStation 3 in 2014; for the Nintendo Switch, PlayStation 4, and Windows in 2018; and for iOS in 2019.

== Gameplay ==
Fighting Dobkeratops, the game's first boss, in the arcade version

The game has a generally slower pace than similar shooting games of the time, and emphasizes enemy pattern memorization as much as player speed. It is composed of eight levels, with a boss enemy at the end of each. The player controls a small spacecraft and must navigate terrain and fight enemies using the various ship weapons. The player's spacecraft has, by default, a weak but rapid-firing main gun; and a more powerful gun called the Wave Cannon, which requires the player to hold their fire to build up power for the cannon.

During the game, the player can obtain an auxiliary device called a Force. This resembles a glowing orange ball. The Force can be attached to the front or back of the player's spacecraft, or detached to fly freely. When attached, the Force provides one of three different powerful weapons, in addition to the main gun and the Wave Cannon.

When detached, these weapons cannot be used, but the Force will instead resort to a secondary set of guns, which can be fired by the player even if the Force is at a distance from the spacecraft. The Force has a secondary use as a shield; it is completely indestructible and can block most things fired at it, as well as damage or destroy enemies on contact. Game designer Abiko mentioned the behavior of dung beetles as an inspiration for the Force.

The "R-" in the title stands for "ray", as in a ray of light, in reference to the many different types of rayed weapons that players use in the series.

== Development ==
Development on the Commodore 64 version began when Activision's Electric Dreams Software subsidiary obtained the rights. David Jolliff was planning on to program the game with James Smart assisting in program help. The original version was shelved, and as a result of the settlement between the creators of Katakis and Activision, Manfred Trenz of Rainbow Arts had the right to do a port, which was made in six weeks.

== Release and ports ==
Hudson Soft developed a fairly accurate port of R-Type for the PC Engine/TurboGrafx-16 console, although it suffered from a slightly lower resolution, reduced color palette, sprite flickering and slowdown. Due to the slightly reduced resolution, the playfield also scrolls slightly in the vertical axis whenever the player's ship approaches the top or bottom of the screen. The Japanese release was split across two game cards (HuCards), titled R-Type I (アール・タイプI, Āru Taipu Wan) and R-Type II (アール・タイプII, Āru Taipu Tsū), while the later North American release (published there by NEC Home Electronics) contained the entire game on a single card. The TurboGrafx-16 version of R-Type has a boss at the end of Stage 6, rather than a prolonged wave of enemies as in all other versions.

The Xbox Live Arcade game R-Type Dimensions was released on February 4, 2009, by Tozai Games. It is a port of the original R-Type and the sequel R-Type II. It can be played either with the original 2D graphics or with new 3D graphics, and has added co-op gameplay functionality. A similar version for the PlayStation 3 was released in May 2014.

The TurboGrafx-16 version of R-Type was one of the first games confirmed for Nintendo's Virtual Console. The Japanese release for the Wii is split between two downloads, mirroring the original format of the game. The Japanese releases for the Nintendo 3DS and Wii U use the North American version instead of the Japanese one, presenting the game as a single download; however, the game was removed from the Nintendo 3DS and Wii U stores on July 30, 2020.

The Master System version became available as well on the Virtual Console for Japan on May 19, 2009, North America on November 2, 2009, and Europe on September 25, 2009; however, due to licensing issues, this version was delisted on September 30, 2011, in North America and Europe and October 18, 2011, in Japan.

In 2010, DotEmu developed an iOS port of R-Type, published by Electronic Arts, released also for Android in September 2011.

Tozai Games returned in 2018 and released an updated digital-only version of R-Type Dimensions, now carrying the title R-Type Dimensions EX, for Microsoft Windows (via Steam), PlayStation 4, and Nintendo Switch. Strictly Limited Games released physical copies of the PlayStation 4 and Nintendo Switch versions in February 2019, limited to 2,000 and 3,000 copies respectively. Collector's Edition variants were also issued which contained a hardcover artbook, dog tags, stickers and cards, once again limited to 1,000 on the PlayStation 4 and 2,000 on the Nintendo Switch.

== Reception ==
Reception

Review scores
Publication	Score					
Publication	Arcade	Atari ST	Game Boy	Master System	TurboGrafx-16	ZX
ACE				900	940	871
AllGame	4/5		3.5/5	4.5/5	4.5/5	
Crash						92%
Computer and Video Games	Positive	85%	85%	84%	92%	93%
Sinclair User						90%
The Games Machine (UK)		82%				90%
Commodore User	9/10					
Computer Entertainer				6/8		
Mean Machines				92%		
Sega Power				91%		

Awards
Publication	Award
Golden Joystick Awards	Best 8-Bit Coin-Op Conversion (runner-up)
Computer and Video Games	Game of the Month
Crash	Crash Smash
Your Sinclair	Megagame

=== Arcade ===
In Japan, Game Machine listed R-Type as the most successful table arcade cabinet of July 1987. It went on to be Japan's highest-grossing table arcade game of 1987. Later in 1988, it was the year's third highest-grossing arcade conversion kit and sixth highest-grossing overall arcade game of the year.

The original R-Type was well received by most critics. However, it was also infamous for its relentless difficulty. Clare Edgeley of Computer and Video Games selected R-Type as the "game of the month" in July 1987. The following month, Commodore User magazine gave it a highly positive review and noted that it drew large crowds queuing up at arcades.

=== Consoles ===
According to Mega Guide in 1992, R-Type had sold "squillions on hand-held".

A 1988 port to the Master System was immediately recognized as one of the best games available in the Sega library. A Mean Machines magazine review praised in particular the graphics and the high quality of the challenge offered by the game, awarding it an overall rating of 92%. In 1989, ACE listed it as one of the top five best games available for both the PC Engine and Master System.

A 1995 article in Next Generation stated that the "PC Engine [TurboGrafx-16] conversion of Irem's arcade smash R-Type is still regarded as the system's definitive contribution to the shoot 'em up genre." The following year they listed both it and the arcade original (but not any other ports of the game) at number 98 in their "Top 100 Games of All Time", praising its art direction, graphics, design innovations, and huge bosses.

In a retrospective review, Allgame editor Shawn Sackenheim described the TurboGrafx-16 version of R-Type as "(the) most accurate home conversion (of the arcade version) of the game", furthermore stating that "it's the shooter that started it all and it's still a thrill ride from beginning to end".

=== Computers ===
The ZX Spectrum version of R-Type was awarded 9/10 in the January 1989 issue of Your Sinclair and was placed at number 6 in their official top 100. The Games Machine praised the "incredible use of colour" and that it "blows away almost every other shoot'em up on the Spectrum". Crash congratulated Electric Dreams for "retaining the frenetic arcade feel and producing such a brilliant game". Sinclair User praised the weapons system and difficulty curve, and C+VG called it "an excellent shoot'em up that's both challenging and addictive. An absolute must for Spectrum blasting fanatics".

The game was runner-up in the category of "Best 8-Bit Coin-Op Conversion of the Year" at the Golden Joystick Awards, behind Operation Wolf.

The implementation of the music in the C64 version was well received, but this port received average reviews due to performance issues and glitches.

== Legacy ==
Irem has developed a number of sequels and related games, including R-Type II and Armed Police Unit Gallop. Their XMultiply, although not part of the series, has similar themes and gameplay, and was released around the same time as R-Type II. However, before any of these games was Katakis, a 1987 clone produced by Factor 5 for the Commodore 64 and the Amiga.

In 1991, Konami released Xexex, a game heavily influenced by R-Type and XMultiply. The game used similar weapons and concepts, such as the "Flint" being a combination of R-Type Force and X Multiply tentacle equipment.

Other games similar to R-Type are Rezon, released by Allumer in 1991, Aicom's Pulstar and Blazing Star (the latter published under Yumekobo) for the Neo Geo, and Technosoft's 1992 title Thunder Force IV for the Sega Genesis.

On April 1, 2019, Granzella announced the development of R-Type Final 2, a sequel to R-Type Final.

Chris Huelsbeck composed new title songs for the Amiga and Commodore 64 versions, which have remained as popular targets for game music remixers. The Amiga theme was composed by Huelsbeck, while the faster C64 theme was composed by Huelsbeck with Ramiro Vaca.

=== Adaptations ===
- R-9A Arrowhead, Scant, and Dobkeratops appears in the Chapter 30 on the manga Warera Hobby's Famicom Seminar.
- R-9A Arrowhead, Scant, Dobkeratops, Wick, Gouger, Gomander and Warship appears in the Chapter 17 on the manga Rock 'n Game Boy.
