= R-Type Final =

2003 PS2 video game

- North American box art
- Developer: Irem
- Publishers: JP: Irem; NA: Eidos Interactive; EU: Metro3D
- Producer: Kazuma Kujo
- Designer: Kazuma Kujo
- Composer: Yuki Iwai
- Series: R-Type
- Platform: PlayStation 2
- Release: JP: July 17, 2003; NA: February 3, 2004; EU: March 26, 2004
- Genre: Scrolling shooter
- Mode: Single-player

R-Type Final (Note: Japanese: アールタイプファイナル, Hepburn: Āru Taipu Fainaru) is a horizontally scrolling shooter by Irem for the PlayStation 2 video game console. It was planned to be the last mainline game in the R-Type series. However, R-Type Tactics was released for the PlayStation Portable in 2007, and the direct sequel R-Type Final 2 was announced on March 30, 2019, and was released on April 29, 2021.

== Plot ==
Final takes place after several long wars against the Bydo, the main antagonist in the R-Type series. The player's first mission is to investigate a mysterious enemy inside a crashed space colony, the remnants of a large battle codenamed Operation Last Dance, a previous attempt to wipe out the Bydo once and for all. This investigative theme is incorporated throughout the game as each level is considered 'research' on the Bydo and unlocks a gallery of in-universe artwork and additional playable ships. Levels are prefaced with hints of the R-Type universe in the form of poetry.

Eventually the player is tasked with finishing where Operation Last Dance left off, and their success with their task is determined by which route the player takes. The primary route sees the player confront the heart of the Bydo, sacrificing themselves and their ship to destroy it in a last stand. One of the alternate routes turns the player ship into a Bydo, and pits the player against their former allies. The final alternate route sees the player taken to the future to fight against an unrelenting wave of Bydo forces with no way to continue once they die.

== Gameplay ==
Final provides 101 playable ships, including altered versions of ships appearing in previous R-Type games, together with many original ones. They are unlocked through a branching system accessed via the R Museum, which was originally featured in R-Types. The PlayStation 2's internal clock is incorporated into each ship's development history (shown through a commemorative plaque) when certain in-game tasks are completed. For example, ships unlocked in 2008 will be seen in the game as having been rolled out in 2168.

== Reception ==
Reception

Aggregate score
Aggregator	Score
Metacritic	79/100

Review scores
Publication	Score
Edge	8/10
Electronic Gaming Monthly	8.17/10 (Note: Two critics of Electronic Gaming Monthly gave the game each a score of 8.5/10, and the other gave it 8/10.)
Famitsu	33/40
Game Informer	6.75/10
GameRevolution	B
GameSpot	8.1/10
GameSpy	3/5
GameZone	8.1/10
IGN	8.1/10
Official U.S. PlayStation Magazine	4/5
X-Play	4/5
The Village Voice	8/10

The game received "generally favorable reviews" according to the review aggregation website Metacritic. In Japan, Famitsu gave it a score of 33 out of 40. GamePro said of the game, "For fans of the genre who thought 2D shooters were phased out to extinction, R-Type Final is a sweet reminder that some types of tried-and-true gameplay never go out of style." (Note: GamePro gave the game three 4/5 scores for graphics, sound, and fun factor, and 4.5/5 for control.)

In a special edition of Edge, listing their 100 top videogames of all time, the game was the only horizontal shooter on the list.
