= Disaster Report =

2002 video game

- North American cover art
- Developer: Irem
- Publishers: JP: Irem, Granzella Inc.; WW: Agetec
- Designer: Kazuma Kujo
- Programmer: Pierre
- Artists: Koichi Kita; Kazuhiro Ushiro; Mizu Seijuro
- Writer: Maki D. Iguchi
- Platform: PlayStation 2
- Release: JP: April 25, 2002; NA: February 18, 2003; UK: March 7, 2003
- Genre: Action-adventure
- Mode: Single-player

Disaster Report, known in Japan as Zettai Zetsumei Toshi (絶体絶命都市, The Desperate City) and in the PAL region as SOS: The Final Escape, is a 2002 survival action-adventure video game developed by Irem for the PlayStation 2. It was released in Japan in 2002 by Irem, and in North America and Europe in 2003, localized by Agetec. It is the first game in the Disaster Report series.

The game deals with the characters' survival and escape from the slow collapse of an artificial island. While dodging falling buildings and debris from periodic earthquakes, the player must find a way off the island. In addition, the main character, a reporter, must investigate the reasons for the disaster.

== Gameplay ==
HP is the character's health and QP is the amount of energy the character has left. QP can be restored by drinking water. If the character becomes thirsty from running or other strenuous tasks, the player must provide the character with drinking water. If the player does not do this, the character begins to slowly lose health. Water can be drank from clean taps or from bottled water filled up along the way. It is possible to give the character's companion water.

Ultimately, the aim of the game is to move through the city avoiding hazards and finding new routes through seemingly impassable hazards. When an aftershock strikes, the player must make Keith crouch, to keep him stable and safe from harm. Customisation of equipment can help Keith, or in the case of certain accessories, change his appearance. Items are stored in the players backpack, which has a limited number of slots, but larger backpacks can be collected. Friendly characters are unarmed.

Keith is accompanied by various companions. At one point, Keith has choice of companion, Karen or Kelly, both with different areas to explore and storylines to uncover. There are seven possible endings to the game.

The Japanese version is one of the few games to support the Trance Vibrator.

== Plot ==
In 1991, the Japanese government commission Terry Stiver (Yoshitaka Shinzaki) to construct a man-made island out in the Pacific Ocean, using revolutionary new engineering technology. Ten years later, in 2001, Japan unveils the newly completed island, named Stiver Island (Capital Island in the Japanese version), complete with a state-of-the-art metropolis called Capital City.

In June 2005, Keith Helm (Masayuki Sudō) travels to Capital City for the first time, after gaining his dream job as an editor for the city's newspaper, the Town Crier. Shortly after he leaves the airport for the city, an earthquake strikes Stiver Island. After regaining consciousness, Keith works to reach the city, as the bridge he is on begins to collapse. Making for safety, he find rescue workers evacuating people, but is unable to reach them in time before they depart. Trying to survive, Keith meets two other survivors as the island and city are hit by strong aftershocks - Karen Morris (Mari Aizawa), and Greg Bach (Kōji Jin'nai). Eventually, the party split up, with Keith either going with Karen to find her dog, or with Greg to aid a young girl, Kelly Austin (Natsumi Higa), find her brother Jason (Haruhiko). While making for the city centre, Keith and his companion(s) find their way beneath the city's surface, where they find water is flooding the island's foundations.

Eventually, Keith reaches the Town Crier building with his chosen companion(s), and meets his boss William (Hideaki Nishiyama), who suspects a conspiracy surrounding the island's construction. Directed to the construction company that built Stiver Island and Capital City, Keith overhears a phone conversation by Terry's business partner Albert, revealing the disaster was man-made and that Albert was responsible for killing Terry's family. After escaping him and his men upon being discovered, Keith brings this information to William, who they either help to evacuate due to the wounds they suffered, or leave him behind to reach safety with their companion(s). Learning rescue workers are evacuating survivors from the city's stadium, Keith travels there, whereupon they help either Karen or Kelly leave by helicopter, shortly before the stadium starts to collapse. After escaping, Keith and his chosen companion take shelter in an abandoned mall, where they find themselves hounded by Albert and his thugs, seeking to prevent them exposing the truth about the disaster. Evading their pursuers as the mall begins to be hit with shockwaves, they eventually escape and reunite with Greg.

The group then encounter Terry (revealed to be Karen's uncle if she is with the group), who explains he built Stiver Island's foundation like a honeycomb, the design allowing him to then flood them with seawater and trigger a man-made earthquake. When he reveals he caused the disaster as revenge against the government for failing to save his family from a landslide, Keith reveals Albert caused the landslide to take advantage of him so he could bring chaos to the government. Shortly after their meeting, as Terry processes this information, the group are forced to escape from Albert, who sends an attack helicopter after them. As they evade its attacks, they overhear a news bulletin revealing a mini-tsunami has been triggered and is heading for what is left of Stiver Island. Forced to beach on broken-up ground, the pair rush into a skyscraper to head for its roof as the water begins to rises.

Upon reaching the top, the group encounter the helicopter again, which drops two more of Albert's thugs. Risking his life to save his companions, Greg is fatally shot moments before the thugs are killed when sections of the skyscraper break apart. Before dying, Greg advises Keith to write an exposé concerning the truth of the disaster. As they make for higher ground, Keith and his companion run into Albert, who holds them at gunpoint, and Terry. During this moment, Terry questions him over his family's death. After Albert shoots him, the two men proceed to open fire on each other, before Terry kills himself and Albert. In the aftermath of their deaths, depending on his actions, Keith and his companion either drown on the building after Albert's helicopter leaves and it falls apart, or both are found by rescue workers and taken to the mainland with Keith vowing to write his article about the disaster.

== Development ==
Designer Kazuma Kujo has recounted that the game's setting was inspired by the disaster novel Japan Sinks, its film adaptation Submersion of Japan and the accounts of those who present for the Great Hanshin earthquake of 1995. Kujo had sought to "take advantage" of the PlayStation 2's processing power to replicate the feeling of living through a disaster, "and I thought it would be entertaining if I made a game where it wasn’t aliens and monsters attacking, but the city itself being a threat".

== Reception ==
Reception

Aggregate score
Aggregator	Score
Metacritic	66/100

Review scores
Publication	Score
Edge	7/10
Electronic Gaming Monthly	5.5/10
Eurogamer	6/10
Famitsu	32/40
Game Informer	5/10
GamePro	4/5
GameRevolution	C+
GameSpot	6.7/10
GameSpy	3/5
GameZone	7.9/10
IGN	6.3/10
Official U.S. PlayStation Magazine	3.5/5
Entertainment Weekly	B

The game received "average" reviews according to the review aggregation website Metacritic. In Japan, Famitsu gave it a score of 32 out of 40.

=== Sequels ===
A sequel, Zettai Zetsumei Toshi 2: Itetsuita Kiokutachi, was released in Japan on March 30, 2006, and later released in America and Europe as Raw Danger!. A second sequel, Zettai Zetsumei Toshi 3: Kowareyuku Machi to Kanojo no Uta, was released for the PSP on April 23, 2009. This game was not released outside Japan. A fourth game, Zettai Zetsumei Toshi 4: Summer Memories, was scheduled for release on PlayStation 3 in April 2011, with 3D and Move support. However, the game was cancelled after the 2011 Tōhoku earthquake.

In December 2014, the creator of the Disaster Report series - Kazuma Kujo - bought the IP of the series from Irem for his company Granzella. Subsequently, Granzella re-released the existing Disaster Report games for download in Japan. The original game and the sequel Raw Danger! were re-released on PlayStation 2 and Zettai Zetsumei Toshi 3 for the PSP. Development for the fourth game was resumed and Granzella released three new teaser pictures and announced to release detailed information around autumn 2015. It was eventually released for PlayStation 4 as Disaster Report 4 Plus: Summer Memories in 2018, with a Nintendo Switch port released in 2020.

In December 2020, Granzella teased that prototyping and planning for the next game in the series, currently titled Disaster Report 5, had begun. No more news as of yet of this project nor the full title of the game.
