= R-Type Delta =

1998 video game

- North American cover art
- Developer: Irem
- Publishers: JP: Irem; NA: Agetec; EU: Sony Computer Entertainment
- Series: R-Type
- Platform: PlayStation
- Release: JP: November 19, 1998; EU: May 14, 1999; NA: August 10, 1999
- Genre: Shoot 'em up
- Mode: Single-player

R-Type Delta (Note: Japanese: アールタイプ デルタ, Hepburn: Āru Taipu Deruta) is a 1998 shoot 'em up video game developed and published by Irem for the PlayStation. It is the fourth game in the R-Type series and the first to feature 3D graphics. The game received generally positive reviews from critics.

== Gameplay ==
In-game screenshot showing the player exchanging shots with ground-stationed enemies in the first stage

R-Type Delta is a shoot 'em up set in 2164. The game offers different fighters, with different Force and Wave Cannon combinations for the player to choose from. It also introduces the Dose System, which allows Forces to absorb energy through collisions with projectiles or enemies. Every Force has a Dose Gauge, and when the Dosage becomes 100%, the player can use the fighter's Delta Attack, a superweapon attack whose form depends on the fighter being used.

== Development ==
Irem began development of R-Type Delta in early 1998. Around the beginning of its development, Taito released a conversion of their arcade game RayStorm for the PlayStation, whose 3D visuals caught the eye of several video game developers and led to the release of several 3D shooting games for the console. Being rather impressed with its fast-paced action and polygonal graphics, Irem began to create a new R-Type game that could potentially rival the success of Taito's game. Led by director Hiroya Kita, Delta was the team's first attempt at a 3D video game, which in early test versions proved problematic as many of their ideas were ineffective in 3D compared to the 2D gameplay that Irem had primarily focused on. Designer Koichi Kita recalls the 3D perspective being difficult to work with, notably with its level terrain as it made it difficult to determine the player's hitbox and often led to the unintended destruction of their ship. Kita also claims the Force pod was a frustrating ordeal as the polygonal visuals made it look "fake" and unappealing.

The idea for multiple playable ships was one of the team's most requested features, as they felt it would add replayability. Originally the player had two different ships to choose from, with a third being added later on to make it more "satisfying" and worthwhile. The goal of the playable ships idea was for each of them to be distinctively different from one another without disrupting the core R-Type gameplay, to make it feel like the player was playing an entirely new game with each ship. The R-9 from the original R-Type was chosen at the very start, followed by an updated version named the R-X. The R-13 ship was made to appeal towards more "hardcore", skilled players, with the "13" added to make it feel more sinister, due to the number's connection with superstition. The "blue" weapon for the R-X was revised several times as the team was unable to decide on what kind of lasers the ships' tentacle-laced Force could shoot. Stage designs were first created with the R-9 in mind, then later altered slightly to accommodate for the two new ships.

Kita came up with the name R-Type Delta based on the fact three different ships were playable, which reminded him of the Greek symbol delta. Early planning documents for the game referred to it as R-Type EVE, a title named after the novel Parasite Eve and met with a mixture of confusion from the production team. Other members suggested R-Type IV or simply R-Type, which they argued made it more recognizable. Kita created a questionnaire sheet with several possible names and sent it to other Irem employees, with Delta receiving the most votes. He also said the symbol represented the number 4, which alluded to it being the fourth mainline R-Type game. Towards the end of development, programmer Takayasu Itou added in the series' traditional "Kid's Mode" and "Human Mode" difficulties, with Kid's being the easiest and Human the hardest. The difficulty itself was made much harder than previous R-Type games as the team wanted the player to memorize stage patterns and learn from their mistakes, which they claimed made the game much more worthwhile to play. An updated version called R-Type Delta: HD Boosted had announced for modern consoles and PC, with a release date on November 20, 2025 in Japan.

== Re-release ==
An updated version called R-Type Delta: HD Boosted was announced in July 2025 for modern consoles and PCs, with a release date on November 20, 2025 in Japan.

== Reception ==
Reception

Aggregate score
Aggregator	Score
GameRankings	86%

Review scores
Publication	Score
AllGame	4/5
CNET Gamecenter	7/10
Edge	7/10
Electronic Gaming Monthly	8.25/10 (Note: Four critics of Electronic Gaming Monthly gave the game each a score of 9/10, 8.5/10, 7.5/10, and 8/10.)
Famitsu	34/40
Game Informer	7.25/10
GameSpot	8.2/10
IGN	8.3/10
Next Generation	3/5
Official U.S. PlayStation Magazine	4.5/5
Dengeki PlayStation	80/100, 90/100

R-Type Delta received favorable reviews according to the Review aggregation website GameRankings. Tom Russo of NextGen said that the game was, "Overall, a fantastic looking effort, but proof that the gameplay limits of this genre will soon relegate all 2D shooters to classic collections." In Japan, Famitsu gave it a score of 34 out of 40. GamePro called it "an excellent time-waster, full of tasty eye-candy and time-tested blasting goodness." (Note: GamePro gave the game two 4.5/5 scores for graphics and control, and two 4/5 scores for sound and fun factor.)

Electronic Gaming Monthly reviewer Che Chou described the game as "the best R-Type [title] ever", while Peter Bartholow of GameSpot said of the Japanese import, "If there's one PlayStation shooter to own, R-Type Delta is that shooter." The game's graphics were highlighted for their diversity, colors, details, and complex polygon models, with GameSpot noting that each enemy offers unique explosions and attacks. The publication also praised the "top-notch" and dynamic soundtrack for giving the game "a catchy fusion of rock and techno that changes with the Japanese import's surroundings."

Although the gameplay was praised for being both hard and rewarding, some reviewers found it unnecessarily difficult and frustrating. GameSpot highlighted the Japanese import's different ships, stating that each offers a strategic use of their weapons and abilities. Edge, however, noted the lack of innovation in the same Japanese import, concluding: "Delta's central gameplay remains a product of the '80s. Your performance upon entering a new level depends largely on trial and error, and the game is as much a test of memory as it is joypad dexterity. As such, it's refreshing and frustrating at the same time [...] A fine shoot 'em up."

In 2015, Hardcore Gaming 101 included the game on the list of the 200 Best Video Games of All Time.
