= Neo Geo Online Collection =

NEOGEOオンラインコレクション NEOGEO Online Collection
- Front cover of NEOGEO Online Collection Complete BOX - Volume 1
- Developer: SNK Playmore
- Publisher: SNK Playmore
- Platform: PS2
- First release: June 30, 2005
- Latest release: June 26, 2008

The NEOGEO Online Collection is a series of classic Neo Geo video games, re-released by SNK Playmore for the PlayStation 2 in Japan. These games allow players to fight against other players over the Internet by way of KDDI's Multi Matching BB matching service. Some of these collections have been released in the United States and Europe, while online connectivity for these collections is not available outside Japan.

== Games in the series ==
The following table lists the games in the collection, both released and announced. Note that some games in the collection were released in different editions: normal, limited, and/or "THE BEST" (a discount version). The dates listed reflect the date the first Neo Geo Online Collection edition was released.

Titles in the Neo Geo Online Collection-series
Vol.	English title	Japanese title	Games included	Release date (Japan)	Sony Catalog No.
#01	Garou: Mark of the Wolves	餓狼-MARK OF THE WOLVES-	Garou: Mark of the Wolves (1998)	2005 June 30	SLPS-25509
#02	The Last Blade 1 and 2	幕末浪漫 月華の剣士1・2	The Last Blade (1997); The Last Blade 2 (1998)	2006 January 12	SLPS-25503
#03	The King of Fighters: Orochi Collection	THE KING OF FIGHTERS -オロチ編-	The King of Fighters '95 (1995); The King of Fighters '96 (1996); The King of Fighters '97 (1997)	2006 April 20	SLPS-25605
#04	Art of Fighting Anthology	龍虎の拳〜天・地・人〜	Art of Fighting (1992); Art of Fighting 2 (1994); Art of Fighting 3: The Path of the Warrior (1996)	2006 May 11	SLPS-25610
#05	Fatal Fury Battle Archives 1	餓狼伝説バトルアーカイブズ1	Fatal Fury (1991); Fatal Fury 2 (1992); Fatal Fury Special (1993); Fatal Fury 3: Road to the Final Victory (1995)	2006 July 20	SLPS-25664
#06	Fatal Fury Battle Archives 2	餓狼伝説バトルアーカイブズ2	Real Bout Fatal Fury (1995); Real Bout Fatal Fury Special (1997); Real Bout Fatal Fury 2: The Newcomers (1998)	2007 February 22	SLPS-25698
#07	The King of Fighters: NESTS Collection	THE KING OF FIGHTERS -ネスツ編-	The King of Fighters '99: Evolution (1999); The King of Fighters 2000 (2000); The King of Fighters 2001 (2001)	2007 April 19	SLPS-25661
#08	Fu'un Super Combo	風雲スーパーコンボ	Savage Reign (1995); Kizuna Encounter: Super Tag Battle (1996)	2007 June 21	SLPS-25781
#09	World Heroes Anthology	ワールドヒーローズ ゴージャス	World Heroes (1992); World Heroes 2 (1993); World Heroes 2 Jet (1994); World Heroes Perfect (1995)	2007 October 18	SLPS-25782
#10	The King of Fighters '98: Ultimate Match	THE KING OF FIGHTERS '98 ULTIMATE MATCH	The King of Fighters '98 (1998)	2008 June 26	SLPS-25783
#11	Sunsoft Collection	サンソフトコレクション	Galaxy Fight: Universal Warriors (1995); Waku Waku 7 (1996)	2008 June 26	SLPS-25849
#12	Samurai Shodown Anthology	サムライスピリッツ六番勝負	Samurai Shodown (1993); Samurai Shodown II (1994); Samurai Shodown III: Blades of Blood (1995); Samurai Shodown IV: Amakusa's Revenge (1996); Samurai Shodown V (2003); Samurai Shodown VI (2005)	2008 July 24	SLPS-25839

Note: The NTSC and PAL versions of The King of Fighters: The Orochi Saga includes The King of Fighters '94 (1994) and The King of Fighters '98 (1998).
