= List of arcade video games: W =

This is a list of arcade video games organized alphabetically by name. It does not include PC or console games unless they were also released in video arcades. See Lists of video games for related lists.

Title	Alternate Title(s)	Year	Manufacturer	Genre(s)	Max. Players	PCB Model
Wacca	—	2019	Marvelous Inc.	Rhythm	1	
Wacko	—	1982	Bally Midway			
Waku Waku 7	—	1996	Sunsoft	Fighting	2	
WaiWai Drive	—	2005	Sammy			
Wakakusa Monogatari Mahjong Yonshimai	—	1996	Maboroshi Ware			
Wall Crash	—	1984	Midcoin			
Wall Street	—	1982	Century Electronics			
Wally wo Sagase!	—	1992	Sega			
Wangan Midnight	—	2001	Namco	Racing	2	
Wangan Midnight: Maximum Tune	—	2004	Sega	Racing	2	
Wangan Midnight: Maximum Tune 2	—	2005	Sega	Racing	2	
Wangan Midnight R	—	2002	Namco	Racing	2	
Wantame Music Channel	—	2007	Capcom			
Wanted (Sega)	—	1982	Sega			
Wanted (Sigma)	—	1984	Sigma			
War Final Assault	—	1999	Atari Games	Shooting gallery	4	
War Gods	—	1996	Midway	Fighting	2	
War Mission	—	1987	EFO SA			
War of Aero	—	1993	Allumer	Shooter	2	
War of the Bugs or Monsterous Manouvers in a Mushroom Maze	—	1981	Armenia			
War of the Worlds	—	1981	Cinematronics	Fixed shooter	1	
Warai no Hana Tenshi	—	1991	Dynax			
Warai no Mahjong Angels: Comic Gekijou Vol. 2	—	1991	Dynax			
Wardner	Wardner no Mori ^{JP} Pyros ^{US}	1987	Toaplan / Taito	Platformer	2	
Warlords	—	1980	Atari	Action	4	
Warp & Warp	Warp Warp	1981	Namco	Shooter	2	
Warp-1	—	1979	Taito			
Warrior	—	1979	Vectorbeam	Fighting	2	
Warrior Blade: Rastan Saga Episode III	—	1992	Taito			
Warriors of Fate	Tenchi wo Kurau II: Sekiheki no Tatakai	1992	Capcom	Beat 'em up	3	CPS1
Watashi wa Suzume-chan	—	1986	Dyna			
Water Balls	—	1996	ABM Electronics			
Water Match	—	1984	Sega			
Water Ski	—	1983	Taito	Sports	2	
Water-Nymph	—	1996	Subsino			
Wave Shark	Jet Wave^{JP}	1996	Konami			
WaveRunner	—	1996	Sega			
WaveRunner GP	—	2001	Sega			NAOMI cart.
Wayne Gretzky's 3D Hockey	—	1996	Atari Games	Sports	4	
WEC Le Mans 24	—	1986	Konami			
Wedding Rhapsody	—	1997	Konami			
Welltris	—	1991	Video System	Puzzle	2	
WGP: Real Racing Feeling	—	1990	Taito			
WGP 2: Real Racing Feeling	—	1991	Taito			
Wheel of Fortune	—	1989	GameTek			
Wheels & Fire	—	199?	TCH			
Wheels II	—	1975	Midway			
Wheels Runner	—	199?	International Games			
Whizz	Twin Falcons	1989	PhilKo Corporation	Scrolling shooter	2	
Who Dunit	—	1988	Exidy			
Who Shot Johnny Rock?	—	1991	American Laser Games			
Wiggie Waggie	—	1994	Promat			
Wild Arrow	—	1982	Meyco Games			
Wild Pilot	—	1992	Jaleco	Shooting gallery	2	
Wild Poker	—	1991	TAB-Austria			
Wild Riders	—	2001	Sega	Driving	1	
Wild West C.O.W.-Boys of Moo Mesa	—	1992	Konami	Run and gun	4	
Wild Western	—	1982	Taito	Shooter	2	
Willow	—	1989	Capcom	Platformer	2	CPS1
Windjammers	Flying Power Disc ^{JP}	1994	Data East	Sports	2	
Winding Heat	—	1996	Konami			
Wing Shooting Championship	—	2001	American Sammy			
Wing War	Wing War R360	1994	SEGA	Flight combat	2	
Wink	—	1985	Midcoin			
Winner's Choice	—	1984	Cal Omega			
Winning Run	—	1988	Namco	Racing	1	
Winning Run '91	—	1991	Namco	Racing	1	
Winning Run Suzuka GP	—	1989	Namco	Racing	1	
Winning Spike	—	1997	Konami			
Winter Heat: Sega Sports	—	1997	Sega			Sega ST-V
Wipe Out	—	1973	Ramtek			
Wiping	Rug Rats ^{NA}	1982	Nichibutsu	Action	2	
Wit's	—	1989	Visco			
Wiz	The Wiz ^{NA}	1985	Taito	Platformer	2	
Wizard Fire	Dark Seal 2 ^{JP}	1992	Data East	Hack and Slash; Beat 'em up	2	
Wizard of Wor	—	1981	Midway	Maze	2	
Wizz Quiz	—	1985	Zilec-Zenitone			
Wonder Boy	—	1986	Sega	Platformer	2	
Wonder Boy in Monster Land	—	1987	Sega	Platformer	2	
Wonder Boy III: Monster Lair	—	1988	Sega	Platformer	2	
Wonder Momo	—	1987	Namco	Beat 'em up	2	
Wonder Planet	—	1987	Data East	Scrolling shooter		
Wonder Stick	—	199?	Yun Sung			
Wonderleague 96	—	1996	SemiCom			
Wonderleague Star: Sok-Magicball Fighting	—	1995	Mijin Computer			
Woodpecker	—	1981	Amenip			
World Adventure	—	1999	F2 System			
World Beach Volley	—	1995	Playmark			
World Class Bowling	—	1995	Incredible Technologies			
World Class Bowling Deluxe	—	1999	Incredible Technologies			
World Class Bowling Tournament	—	1997	Incredible Technologies			
World Club Champion Football European Clubs 2004-2005	—	2005	Sega	Sports		
World Club Champion Football European Clubs 2005-2006	—	2006	Sega	Sports		
World Club Champion Football Serie A 2001-2002	—	2002	Sega	Sports		
World Club Champion Football Serie A 2002-2003	—	2003	Sega	Sports		
World Combat	Warzaid ^{EU}	2002	Konami	Shooting gallery	4	
World Court: Pro Tennis	—	1988	Namco	Sports	2	
World Cup Volley '95	—	1995	Data East	Sports		
World Darts!	—	1987	Arcadia Systems	Sports	2	Arcadia
World Heroes	—	1992	SNK	Fighting	2	
World Heroes 2	—	1993	SNK	Fighting	2	
World Heroes 2 Jet	—	1994	SNK	Fighting	2	
World Heroes Perfect	—	1995	SNK	Fighting	2	
World Kicks	—	2000	Namco			NAOMI cart.
World PK Soccer	Kick for the Goal	1994	Jaleco	Sports		
World PK Soccer V2	—	1996	Jaleco	Sports		
World Rally	—	1993	Gaelco			
World Rally 2: Twin Racing	—	1995	Gaelco			
World Series - The Season	—	1985	Cinematronics		2	
World Series Baseball	—	2001	Sega			NAOMI GD-ROM
World Soccer Finals	—	1990	Leland			
World Soccer Winning Eleven Arcade Game Style	Pro Evolution Soccer: The Arcade	2002	Konami			
World Soccer Winning Eleven Arcade Game Style 2003	—	2004	Konami			
World Tennis	—	1982	Original Game			
World Trophy Soccer	—	1989	Arcadia Systems	Sports	2	Arcadia
World Wars	—	1987	SNK			
WOW New Fantasia	—	2002	Comad			
WOW New Fantasia (Alt. Version)	—	2002	Comad			
Wrestle War	—	1989	Sega	Pro wrestling		
Wully Bully	—					
WWF WrestleFest	—	1991	Technōs	Pro wrestling		
WWF Superstars	—	1989	Technōs	Pro wrestling		
WWF Royal Rumble	—	2000	Sega			NAOMI cart.
WWF WrestleMania: The Arcade Game	—	1995	Midway	Pro wrestling		
Wyvern F-0	—	1985	Taito	Scrolling shooter		
Wyvern Wings	Wivern Wings	2001	Semicom	Scrolling shooter	2	
