= World Heroes (video game) =

1992 video game

- Japanese arcade flyer
- Developer: Alpha Denshi: Sunsoft (Super NES) Sega Midwest Studio (Genesis)
- Publishers: SNK: Neo Geo CD; JP: Alpha Denshi; NA: SNK; Super NES; Sunsoft; Genesis; Sega
- Producer: Kenji Sawatari
- Designer: Kimitoshi Yokoo
- Programmer: Yuji Noguchi
- Artists: Akira Ushizawa; Atsushi Kobayashi; Hatsue Sakanishi
- Composers: Hideki Yamamoto; Hiroaki Shimizu; Yuka Watanabe
- Series: World Heroes
- Platforms: Arcade, Neo Geo AES, Neo Geo CD, Sega Genesis, Super Nintendo Entertainment System
- Release: July 28, 1992: Arcade; JP: July 28, 1992 Neo Geo AES; NA/JP: September 11, 1992 Super NES; JP: August 12, 1993; NA: September 1993; EU: 1993 Genesis; NA: 1994 Neo Geo CD; JP: March 17, 1995
- Genre: Fighting
- Modes: Single-player, multiplayer
- Arcade system: Neo Geo MVS

World Heroes (Note: Japanese: ワールド・ヒーローズ, Hepburn: Wārudo Hīrōzu) is a 1992 fighting video game developed by Alpha Denshi and published by SNK for the Neo Geo arcade and home systems. It is ADK's first game in the fighting game genre, as well as their earliest attempt in the fighting game trend of the 1990s that was popularized by Capcom's 1991 arcade hit Street Fighter II.

World Heroes was followed by a sequel, released less than a year later, titled World Heroes 2.

== Gameplay ==
Gameplay screenshot showcasing Hanzō Hattori performing a throw with Kim Dragon

World Heroes is controlled with three of the four buttons ("A" to punch, "B" to kick and "C" to throw) used along with an 8-way joystick on the Neo Geo MVS arcade cabinet. The punches and kicks have two levels, weak and strong. In order to get each strength with just two buttons, the punch and kick buttons have to be pressed briefly for weak and longer for strong. This same mechanic even can be performed with special moves. The throw button C, if close enough to the opponent, grabs and throws the opponent across the stage; however, if holding the joystick in the opposite direction at the right time, the opponent would be tossed the opposite direction. Introduced in the fighting game genre by World Heroes are some abilities exclusive to some characters that were used in several later fighting games, such as multi-jumping using Hanzou and Fuuma, and shooting projectiles from the air using Rasputin.

There are eight playable characters in the roster and two different play modes for players to choose from: "Normal Game" and "Death Match". In "Normal Game", players have to defeat the other seven playable characters in a random order, followed by a battle against the final boss Geegus (misspelled as "Gee Gus" in localized English versions), all by using the chosen character. If the player defeats an opponent, the player moves on to the next opponent. After the third battle, the player has a bonus round to carve a block of stone into a statue in ten seconds with repeated hits. After the sixth battle, the player has another bonus round to break falling pots in ten seconds before they hit the ground.

"Death Match" acts like Normal Mode with a difference. Players will fight in a ring with environmental hazards such as electrical barriers, spiked walls, oil puddles and others which players must avoid while fighting. Players also can force their opponents against the environmental hazards to their advantage. Also, unlike the normal game where battles take place in various locations, all death match battles take place in a closed boxing-esque arena setting, and take place in front of a live audience.

== Plot ==
In the future, DR. Sugar Brown, a scientist, wants to find the strongest fighter in history. Using a time machine, he brings fighters from different centuries together for a one-on-one tournament. The fighters do not know they are being watched by an enemy who could endanger them and the world.

== Characters ==
- Hattori Hanzo (服部 半蔵, Hattori Hanzō), the protagonist of the game, is the head of Iga ninja clan, during the Ashikaga Shogunate. As he's been sent to a world that's unknown to him, he continues to train and obtain enlightenment as a ninja warrior, and considers himself naive, though he has hopes to one day become the greatest. He is the rival of Fuuma Kotaro.
- Kotaro Fuuma (風魔 小太郎, Fūma Kotarō), is the fifth leader of the Fuuma ninja clan and Hanzo's rival. Unlike his enemy, he is an easy going womanizer who does not like to work any harder than he has to. He also adopts to culture that he's part of and is excited by changes.
- Kim Dragon (キム・ドラゴン / 金龍, Kim Dragon), a famous Korean-Chinese martial arts film star in the 20th century. His career is compared to that of singers, but he wants to be a great fighter as well, just like his idol Bruce Lee. He enters the World Heroes tournament to prove his point.
- Jeanne d'Arc (ジャンヌ・ダルク, Jannu Daruku), a Frenchwoman from the 15th century who has a mastery at fencing. A bearer of tremendous beauty, she roamed her homeland in search of a strong fighter to become her husband. However, she continues her search in a different timeline now.
- J. Carn (J・カーン, Jei Kān), the heroic leader of the Mongolian marauding horde, this juggernaut warrior is the strongest fighter of his army. He led his army of powerful soldiers to many victories and conquests throughout Eurasia.
- Muscle Power (マッスル•パワー, Massuru Pawā), an American all-star pro-wrestler. He also strongly believes his own powers of his muscles is #1. He fights in the World Heroes tournament to prove his point. He dreams of making a name for himself in the pro-wrestling world.
- Brocken (ブロッケン, Burokken), is a cyborg developed by Dr. Brown initially for the army of Nazi Germany. After their final defeat in World War II, he travels the world to prove that the power of science is the greatest of them all.
- Rasputin (ラスプーチン, Rasupūchin), the leader of a love cult based on Russia. He is also a sorcerer with great knowledge of magic, and fights the other World Heroes, preaching about love all of mankind should have.
- Geegus (ギガス, Gigasu), the final boss who is an artificial polymorphic experiment from the future, created by a mad scientist named Damned. It is sent to the past multiple times to slaughter anyone that stands in its way, intending to invade and conquer planets.

== Development ==
According to ADK World, the other famous and infamous figures that were considered for the cast were Al Capone, Billy the Kid, Musashi Miyamoto, Hanzo Hattori, Napoleon Bonaparte, Adolf Hitler, and Jack the Ripper. A Korean warrior who was the game's intended sub-boss, and an Egyptian warrior were also in the works.

Out of the entire prototype lineup, Hattori was the only one kept for the final product. Hitler was taken and reworked into a different Nazi-based fictional character named Brocken to avoid controversy. Jack was also redesigned and later added to the cast in World Heroes 2 Jet. Miyamoto's character was instead used in other SNK titles such as The Last Blade, the Samurai Shodown series and Ganryu.

== Ports and related releases ==
World Heroes was later ported to the Neo Geo AES in both Japan and North America on September 11, 1992, which is identical to the Neo Geo MVS version, but designed for home gaming, just like nearly every AES versions of Neo Geo titles. World Heroes was later ported to the Neo Geo CD exclusively in Japan by ADK on March 17, 1995 and then to North America in October 1996, which is the same as the MVS and AES versions, but with arranged background music.

Besides SNK's consoles, it was first ported by Sunsoft to the Super Nintendo Entertainment System in Japan on August 12, 1993, in North America in September 1993, and PAL regions in 1993. Later, it was ported to the Sega Mega Drive / Genesis by Sega Midwest Studio (then known as Sega Midwest Development Division) exclusively in North America in 1994. The Neo Geo AES version was also added to the Wii's Virtual Console first in Japan on September 28, 2007, then in North America on October 8, 2007, and in Europe on October 19, 2007. Later, it was added to a compilation of Neo Geo arcade games for the PlayStation 2, PlayStation Portable and Wii titled SNK Arcade Classics Vol. 1 as an unlockable game. Hamster Corporation re-released the game as part of their ACA Neo Geo series for the PlayStation 4, Xbox One, Nintendo Switch, Windows, Android and iOS.

On October 18, 2007, SNK Playmore added it with its three sequels to the arcade game compilation World Heroes Gorgeous: Neo Geo Online Collection Vol. 9 (ワールドヒーローズ ゴージャス) in Japan for the PlayStation 2. It was later published in North America on March 11, 2008, and in Europe on November 7, 2008, both titled as World Heroes Anthology. This was created to celebrate the 15th Anniversary of the World Heroes series. This compilation was later reprinted as part of a series of best-sellers labeled "The Best" in Japan on June 18, 2009.

== Reception ==
Reception

Review scores
Publication	Score
Computer and Video Games	(Arcade) 74% (SNES) 81%
Electronic Gaming Monthly	(SNES) 26 / 40 (Genesis) 26 / 50
Famitsu	(Neo Geo) 22 / 40
GameFan	(Neo Geo) 182 / 200
GamePro	(Genesis) 11.5 / 20
Sinclair User	(Arcade) 81%
Electronic Games	(Genesis) D
Joystick	(Neo Geo) 88%

The arcade version was commercially successful upon release. It was said to be one of the first games that brought the attention of SNK's consoles to game players. In Japan, Game Machine listed World Heroes on their September 1, 1992 issue as being the third most-popular arcade game at the time.

In the United States, on RePlay magazine's coin-op earnings charts, World Heroes topped the software conversion kits chart in July 1992, ranking just above Capcom's Street Fighter II. RePlay then reported World Heroes to be the most-popular arcade game in September 1992. It was then the top-grossing software conversion kit during October to November 1992, and then again in January 1993. On the April 1993 charts, it was the fifth highest-earning software conversion kit. On the May 1993 chart, it dropped to number-eight, with World Heroes 2 at number-five. It was one of America's top five highest-grossing arcade games of 1993.

=== Critical reception ===
The September 1992 issue of Sinclair User gave the arcade game a score of 81%. The October 1993 issue of Computer and Video Games scored it 74%.

On release in the home retail market, Famicom Tsūshin scored the Neo Geo console version of the game a 22 out of 40. GameFan's two reviewers scored the Neo Geo console version 92% and 90%. One of the reviewers stated "that it is NOT just another Street Fighter 2 clone", praising the "all new" and "unique" moves and characters, and "the weapons and added Death Match." The other called it "a great fighting game" that rivals Street Fighter II and is "surpassed only by Art of Fighting."

Electronic Gaming Monthly gave the Genesis version a 26 out of 50, commenting that "The Super NES version was a good Neo Geo reproduction, but this one completely misses! The action is incredibly slow (and a bit choppy) and the voices are horrendous!" GamePro criticized the Genesis version as well, citing slow action, mediocre graphics, poor sound, and hapless opponent AI. In 2018, Complex rated World Heroes 62nd in their "The Best Super Nintendo Games of All Time".

=== Promotion ===
Early pictures of the Super NES version of the game were presented at the 1993 Winter Consumer Electronics Show.
