= Pleasure Goal: 5 on 5 Mini Soccer =

1996 video game

- Arcade flyer
- Developer: Saurus
- Publisher: SNK
- Producer: Nobuyuki Tanaka
- Designer: Kenji Ishimoto
- Programmers: Akio Ōi; Koji Kawakubo; S. Yamane
- Artists: J. Mikami; Kiyoshi Matsueda; Kurara Kiri
- Composers: Kazuhiko Oshikiri; Sin Chan
- Platforms: Arcade, Neo Geo CD
- Release: WW: July 19, 1996
- Genre: Sports
- Modes: Single-player, multiplayer
- Arcade system: Neo Geo MVS

Pleasure Goal: 5 on 5 Mini Soccer (Note: Also known as Futsal: 5 on 5 Mini Soccer (Japanese: フットサル: 5オン5ミニサッカー, Hepburn: Futtosaru: 5 on 5 Mini Sakkā) in Japan) is a 1996 futsal video game developed by Saurus and published by SNK for the Neo Geo arcade and home platforms. In the game, players compete against either AI-controlled opponents or other players in matches across various stadiums. The title was created by most of the same team that would later work on future projects at Saurus such as Shock Troopers. Though first launched for Neo Geo MVS, it was later released for Neo Geo CD and has since been re-released through download services on various consoles.

== Gameplay ==
Gameplay screenshot

Pleasure Goal: 5 on 5 Mini Soccer is a futsal game played from an top-down perspective in a two-dimensional environment with pre-rendered sprites. Although it follows the same gameplay as with other soccer titles at the time and most of the sport's rules are present as well, the game opts for a more arcade-styled and faster-paced approach of the sport, instead of being a full simulation. There are multiple stadiums to choose from, each with their own characteristics. There are 16 teams available to choose from before starting, each one representing their country.

== Development and release ==
Pleasure Goal: 5 on 5 Mini Soccer was created by most of the same team that would later work on future projects at Saurus such as Shock Troopers, with Nobuyuki Tanaka acting as producer. Kenji Ishimoto served as designer while Akio Ooi, Koji Kawakubo and S. Yamane were involved as programmers. Designers J. Mikami, Kiyoshi Matsueda, Kurara Kiri, Naohide Nakagawa, "Suitanakano", Sumire Azuma, Yuko Hara and Yuri Tachikawa were also responsible for the artwork. Sound was handled by Kazuhiko Oshikiri and Sin Chan. The game was first released by SNK for both Neo Geo MVS and Neo Geo CD on July 19, 1996. Prior to launch, the title first showcased to the public at the 1996 AOU Show. The Japanese CD release has since become one of the more expensive titles on the platform, with copies of the port fetching over US$400 on the secondary video game collecting market. It has since been re-releases in recent years on digital distribution platforms such as the Nintendo eShop, PlayStation Network and Xbox Live.

== Reception ==
Reception

Review score
Publication	Score
Super Game Power	(NGCD) 4.0/5.0

French magazine Player One gave Pleasure Goal: 5 on 5 Mini Soccer a positive outlook. Chris Moyse of Destructoid noted Pleasure Goal: 5 on 5 Mini Soccer's pacing and style similar to that of early International Superstar Soccer on both Super Nintendo Entertainment System and Sega Genesis, while regarding its "techno" music to be amusing.
