= World Heroes =

- The first and most commonly used logo for the World Heroes series.
- Genre: Fighting game
- Developer: Alpha Denshi/ADK (assisted by SNK)
- Publishers: ADK, SNK
- First release: World Heroes; July 28, 1992
- Latest release: World Heroes Perfect; May 25, 1995

World Heroes (ワールドヒーローズ, Wārudo Hīrōzu) is a series of four fighting games created originally by ADK with assistance from SNK for the Neo Geo family of arcade and home consoles.

Over the years, the games have been ported to various non-SNK platforms as well including the Super NES and Sega Saturn. A fifth title World Heroes Pocket was announced for release on the Neo Geo Pocket around 1999 but later canceled.

== Gameplay ==
The series plays similar to many other fighting games, but instead of a 6-button layout, the original World Heroes uses only 3 of the standard 4 Neo-Geo buttons: one for punching, another for kicking, and the last for throwing. The former two buttons can be held down longer in order to deliver stronger attacks, similar to the first Street Fighter control scheme, with only two levels of strength and using standard buttons instead of pneumatic buttons. In the SNES version (and later games, starting with World Heroes 2 Jet), it is possible to assign the 4 basic attacks to different buttons. In World Heroes Perfect, each character had a traditional four-button attack layout, but could also achieve stronger attacks by pushing down two respective punch or kick buttons at the same time.

In World Heroes Perfect, every character has an ABC Special Move that can be activated by pressing the A, B, and C buttons at the same time. Moves vary by character, though they all require strategic use and are easy to activate, allowing for more tactical battles. For example, the character Fuuma's ABC Special allows him to fake a special move; J. Max's ABC Special allows him to catch, hold onto, and throw back projectiles; and Kim Dragon's ABC Special allows him to perform counters while blocking.

Aside from the normal tournament mode, there is also the popular "Death Match" mode (which was removed in World Heroes 2 Jet and World Heroes Perfect). In it, the arenas are filled with different kinds of traps that can change conditions in the bouts or even damage the characters (such as spiked walls, landmines, burning ropes, slick floors, etc.). The "Death Match" modes of the first two titles in the series may have been inspired by the growing popularity of deathmatch style professional wrestling in Japan at the time, mostly made famous by Frontier Martial-Arts Wrestling.

== Story ==
The general premise is that a scientist, Dr. Brown, having perfected a time machine, organized a tournament for various "World Heroes" throughout all of history to engage in combat with each other. True to this plot, many of the fighters are based on actual historical figures, while some are fictional ones.

== List of games in the series ==
Overview of World Heroes games
Japanese Title	English Title	System	Year
ワールドヒーローズ	World Heroes	Neo Geo MVS; Neo Geo AES; Neo-Geo CD; Mega Drive/Genesis; SNES; PlayStation 2 Virtual Console; PSN	1992
ワールドヒーローズ2	World Heroes 2	Neo Geo MVS; Neo Geo AES; Neo-Geo CD; PC-Engine Super CD-ROM²; SNES; PlayStation 2 Virtual Console	1993
ワールド ヒーローズ2 ジェト	World Heroes 2 Jet	Neo Geo MVS; Neo Geo AES; Neo-Geo CD; Game Boy; PlayStation 2 Virtual Console	1994
ワールド ヒーローズ パーフェクト	World Heroes Perfect	Neo Geo MVS; Neo Geo AES; Neo-Geo CD; Sega Saturn; PlayStation 2 Virtual Console	1995

=== Other/canceled games ===
Game	Details
World Heroes Anthology Original release date(s): JP: October 18, 2007; NA: March 11, 2008; PAL: 2008	Release years by system: 2007 – PlayStation 2
World Heroes Anthology Original release date(s): JP: October 18, 2007; NA: March 11, 2008; PAL: 2008	Notes: Released in Japan as World Heroes Gorgeous; A compilation of all four World Heroes titles in the series with exclusive features.
World Heroes Pocket Original release date(s): Cancelled	Release years by system: Cancelled
World Heroes Pocket Original release date(s): Cancelled	Notes: A World Heroes game originally planned for release on the Neo Geo Pocket sometime in 2000, but the project was discontinued.

== Related releases ==
Fuuma Kotaro appears as a playable character in the 1994 fighting game Aggressors of Dark Kombat, which was also created by ADK. However, some of his moves from the World Heroes series were removed to make him fair enough to fight. Every character from the World Heroes series as well as some characters from other ADK games were featured in the Neo Geo CD-exclusive title, ADK World.

Since World Heroes Perfect and ADK World, and during the Neo Geo Pocket era, ADK suffered enough financial difficulties to file for bankruptcy; however, all intellectual properties and copyrights to their video game and character library were bought by SNK Playmore. Due to the World Heroes series being entirely originally released for the Neo-Geo platform, some characters from the franchise returned in the fighting game NeoGeo Battle Coliseum and the card game SNK vs. Capcom: Card Fighters DS as a result, as well as SNK Heroines: Tag Team Frenzy.

== Characters ==
This section lists the characters in the original game, and characters added or removed in subsequent releases.

=== World Heroes ===
- (Brazil) Dr. Brown
  This unplayable character, and his involvement with the concept of time travel, serves as an apparent homage to Doc Brown from the Back to the Future film trilogy (he became fully known as "Dr. Brown Sugar" with the release of Neo Geo Heroes: Ultimate Shooting). Dr. Brown has been also responsible for bringing and helping Nakoruru, Love Heart, and Mui Mui in the event of The King of Fighters XIV.
- (Japan) Hattori Hanzō
  Hanzo is the protagonist of the series and uses many moves and commands similar to Ryu from the Street Fighter series, a common occurrence in fighting games of the time. However, in later titles of the series, Hanzo became slightly less comparable to Ryu. Hanzo also appears in NeoGeo Battle Coliseum as a playable character. He is based on the historical ninja of the same name.
- (Japan) Fūma Kotarō
  He is considered the rival of the main character Hanzo Hattori and as such they both share many similar moves (albeit using different names) in a similar fashion to Ken from the Street Fighter series. Fūma also appears in both Aggressors of Dark Kombat and NeoGeo Battle Coliseum as a playable character. He is based on the actual Fūma Kotarō, who allegedly killed the real Hanzo. In the ADK universe, Fūma is portrayed as a fun-loving bandit who is willing to adopt new ideas. Sometimes, he will stay in the modern era after time-traveling, which happens in Aggressors of Dark Kombat.
- Rasputin
  A philosopher of 13th century Russia, was also a known alchemist and sorcerer. He discovered a way to expand his fists and feet so he could fight from a distance. He accepted the chance to fight Geegus because he sees Geegus as a fallen angel. He keeps pleading that loving one another is important and will not give into people who do not listen to his constant persuasion. He is based loosely on Grigori Rasputin.
- (Kingdom of France) Janne D'Arc
  She is a 15th-century feminist, who protects the circus that raised her and has proven to be one of the toughest fencers of her time. She accepted the invitation to defeat Geegus, only to prove that women are tougher than men. She puts all her worries about getting married into her blows. She enters the later tournaments to try to seek a husband, but finds out that men are intimidated by her strength as a fighter. She is loosely based on Joan of Arc. She is also a downloadable playable in The King of Fighters mainline-based tie-in crossover title, SNK Heroines: Tag Team Frenzy, where she was dragged into Kukri’s pocket dream dimension alongside some other girls who participated previous KOF, with one of them are male fighters who are transformed into females in that dimension.
- J. Carn
  He is fierce and merciless in hand-to-hand combat. J. Carn joined the World Heroes tournament to fight Geegus out of boredom. He has become a tyrant and wants to be victorious by hurling his raw brawn. He and Ryofu respect each other's power. He is loosely based on the actual Genghis Khan, but his look and fighting style share some similarities to Uighur the Warden from Fist of the North Star.
- (Germany) Brocken
  Brocken is a Third Reich produced android, and his moveset contains techniques involving mechanically-extended limbs and missile 'fists'. He is loosely based on Rudolph von Stroheim from the JoJo's Bizarre Adventure manga franchise. Some other parts of his look were also influenced by the titular character of the first two Terminator films, and (with his name) Brockenman or his son Brocken Jr. from the manga/anime series Kinnikuman. He later became the playable character of the side-scrolling shoot 'em up in the Japan-only, Neo Geo CD-exclusive title ADK World.
- Kim Dragon
  Dragon is a Chinese famous martial artist and a star of martial arts films of Korean descent. Accused of lacking real skill, he accepted the invitation to fight against Geegus. He is based on real-life martial artist and actor Bruce Lee, but in the first game, his stage is set in China, whereas in World Heroes 2, his stage is set at Yongdusan Park in Busan, South Korea. He was possibly named after president of SNK's then-Korean distributor Viccom, Kim Kap-Hwan (after whom the Fatal Fury character was also named), to avoid copyright infringement. His rapid punching moves share some similarities to Kenshiro from the manga/anime series Fist of the North Star. In the first game, his nationality is indicated as Chinese and the Chinese characters used to spell his name in World Heroes Perfect translate to "Gold Dragon".
- (United States) Muscle Power
  An American wrestler from the 21st century, he was the first competitor to win every Heavyweight Championship from every wrestling association. He accepted Doc Brown's invitation to fight Geegus because he took Geegus as a challenger of his multiple belts. He is based on the wrestler Hulk Hogan. His looks were slightly altered in World Heroes 2 and subsequent titles to tone down the resemblance and avoid copyright infringement. Despite this, the first World Heroes has been re-released a few times without changing any parts of his look other than adding extra palettes in World Heroes Anthology.
- (N/A) Geegus
  Geegus is a cyborg created by the secret organization called D.A.M.D.; he can shapeshift into any of the eight fighters and use their moves at will, similar to Shang Tsung from the Mortal Kombat series. Geegus wants to destroy Earth; the World Heroes tournament was created to stop his evil plans. After all but one fighter have been eliminated, Geegus demands that the Champion fight him or he will destroy the entire planet. Geegus appears in World Heroes 2 as Neo Geegus, serving as the game's sub-boss. In this game, he can only transform into any of the six new characters of this game: Kidd, Erick, Ryoko, Mudman, Shura and Johnny. Neo Geegus also cannot be harmed while shape shifting, unlike in the first game. Geegus' design and abilities are, seemingly, a homage to the T-1000 liquid metal cyborg from Terminator 2: Judgment Day. Geegus makes a cameo appearance in NeoGeo Battle Coliseum as part of Neo Dio's Geo-Geegus desperation move; he also appears as Geo Geegus in the game Neo Geo Heroes: Ultimate Shooting.

=== World Heroes 2 ===
- ( (Kingdom of Great Britain) ) Captain Kidd
  A pirate who steals treasures from all over the world. He is based on the infamous William Kidd. His special moves involve ghost sharks, impressive kick moves and even throwing a blue miniature ghost pirate ship at the opponent. He also has a hanging rope for his super move in World Heroes Perfect. Although he has no nationality, he was born as an Englishman in the British Empire.
- (Norway) Erick
  A Viking who wants to see his family. He is loosely based on the explorer Erik the Red. His special moves are named after features from Norse mythology, such as Odin, Thor and Æsir.
- (United States) Johnny Maximum
  An American football player who describes himself as a "killer machine". In his World Heroes Perfect ending, it is revealed that he has a son, who wants to be like him, though Johnny does not approve of that. He is loosely based on American Football player Joe Montana.
- (Papua New Guinea) Mudman
  A Papuan wizard with a large wooden mask and no real historical basis apart from appearing primitive. However, he is similar to the protagonist of Daijiro Morohoshi's "Mud Men" series in Monthly Shōnen Champion. He also appears in NeoGeo Battle Coliseum as a playable character. Mudman attacks using blue spirits and flying mask-spinning attacks.
- (Japan) Ryoko Izumo
  Ryoko is a 16-year-old girl and a master of Judo who wants to prove her power against the rest of the fighters of the tournament. She admires Janne and Hanzo, considering them her role models; Janne for her beauty and strength, Hanzo for his skill. She is based on the famous real-life judoka Ryoko Tamura.
- (Thailand) Shura (Naï Khanom Tom)
  Shura is a 25-year-old Muay Thai fighter who has joined the tournament to prove his worth to his feared dead older brother (even though his brother is actually alive and well). He is based on the legendary Muay Thai hero, Nai Khanom Tom.
- (N/A) Dio
  Another cyborg created by D.A.M.D. to finish what Geegus started, but went rogue and is now on a worldwide killing spree. He is the final boss of World Heroes 2 and later reappears in World Heroes Perfect, also as the final boss, with the name Neo Dio. He is inspired by the main character of Baoh and shares similar attacks to him. He also resembles another character created by Hirohiko Araki, Kars, the leader of the "Pillar Men" from the second series of Jojo's Bizarre Adventure: he has sharp blades on his elbows just like him and he is a shapeshifter as well. His name, Dio, is also another homage to Araki: in fact, the historic villain of the series is named Dio Brando. He is also a boss and playable character in NeoGeo Battle Coliseum. The Super NES version lists his occupation as "Ultimate Being". "Dio" also means "God" in Italian.

=== World Heroes 2 Jet ===
- (Qing dynasty) Ryofu
  A Chinese warrior that wields the Heaven Scorching Halberd (方天画戟 fāng tiān huà jǐ) and is the rival of J.Carn. He is loosely based on the warlord Lü Bu of the Three Kingdoms era.
- (Kingdom of Great Britain) Jack
  A punk serial killer with claws on his hands. He is loosely based on the historical serial killer Jack the Ripper.
- (Byzantine Empire) Zeus
  The main boss in this title. His look and some moves are inspired from Souther and Raoh, two of the main antagonists in the Fist of the North Star saga. He originally appeared in ADK's Ninja Commando, where he is referred to as "Spider", the leader of Mars Corporation.

=== World Heroes Perfect ===
- (Qing dynasty) Songoku
  He is based on the famous mythological character Sun Wukong ("Journey to the West").
