= World Heroes Anthology =

2007 video game

- Developer: Prosoft
- Publishers: SNK, Takara
- Platform: PlayStation 2
- Release: JP: October 18, 2007; NA: March 11, 2008; AU: September 25, 2008; EU: November 7, 2008
- Genre: Versus fighting game
- Modes: Single-player, multiplayer

World Heroes Anthology, known in Japan as World Heroes Gorgeous (ワールドヒーローズ ゴージャス, Wārudo Hīrōzu Gōjasu), is a game compilation which includes all four games from ADK's World Heroes series, which were a part of the early Neo Geo titles from SNK. The four games presented here World Heroes, World Heroes 2, World Heroes 2 Jet, and World Heroes Perfect. The compilation was released exclusively for the PlayStation 2 on March 11, 2008.

== Story ==
The main storyline is based around Dr. Brown who has created a time machine able to bring together fighters from various times in history, with the goal of determining the greatest fighter of all time. As the games focus on different time frames throughout history, most of its characters are based on real people.

- World Heroes (1992)
- World Heroes 2 (1993)
- World Heroes 2 Jet (1994)
- World Heroes Perfect (1995)

== Reception ==
Reception

Aggregate score
Aggregator	Score
Metacritic	53/100

Review scores
Publication	Score
Eurogamer	5/10
GamesMaster	39%
GameSpot	5.5/10
GamesRadar+	3/5
IGN	5.3/10
X-Play	2/5

The game received "mixed or average" reviews according to video game review aggregator Metacritic.
