= Neo Geo Heroes: Ultimate Shooting =

2010 video game

- Japanese packaging artwork
- Developer: SNK Playmore
- Publisher: SNK Playmore
- Platform: PlayStation Portable
- Release: JP: July 29, 2010; NA: December 7, 2010
- Genres: Vertical Scrolling shooter, run and gun
- Modes: Single-player, multiplayer

Neo Geo Heroes: Ultimate Shooting (Note: Japanese: ネオジオ ヒーローズ ～アルティメット シューティング～) is a shooting game developed and published by SNK Playmore for the PlayStation Portable in 2010.

== Gameplay ==
Players can choose to rotate action on the screen horizontally or vertically based on their preferences. This allows players to play their PSP in whatever two positions they desire.

A normal story in Story Mode consists of fifteen stages. Each story has multiple story paths and endings the players can now explore with each character.

Players can choose to test themselves in a Challenge Mode. Two known options is a survival mode against all the bosses, and a shooting mode that limits or tests the players for their best rankings.

Using wireless connection, two players can also stage multiplayer competitions with one another. The competition settings are the same as KOF Sky Stage. Since the game features the same characters as KOF Sky Stage, an option to play it is also available.

The Museum Mode features profile information and artwork for each character. It also features a sound select and rankings for the players to review.

== Characters ==
Playable

- Akari Ichijo
- Athena Asamiya
- Iori Yagami
- Iroha
- Kula Diamond
- Kyo Kusanagi
- Mai Shiranui
- Marco Rossi
- SYDIII Pilot
- Terry Bogard

Non-playable

- Doctor Brown

Bosses

- Geo-Geegus
- Goenitz
- Kusanagi
- Omega Rugal
- Orochi
- Orochi Chris
- Orochi Iori
- Orochi Shermie
- Orochi Yashiro
- Rugal Bernstein

== Release ==
The game first released on July 29, 2010 in Japan. A North American release was on December 7 of that year.

Consumers who reserved the product early received a CD featuring the original soundtrack for this game, the arranged soundtrack for KOF Sky Stage, and other music choices from other SNK shooting titles.

== Reception ==
Reception

Review scores
Publication	Score
Famitsu	26/40
GamesRadar+	6/10

Neo Geo Heroes: Ultimate Shooting received mixed reviews upon its release. The game was praised for its gameplay and the inclusion of NeoGeo based characters while being criticized for framerate issues and lack of tutorial.

GamesRadar complimented the challenging boss fights and large amount of extra content, although noting that the "Frequently dull levels suck out a lot of the charm".
