= World Heroes 2 =

1993 video game

- Developers: ADK; Agenda (Note: Additional work by ADS) (PC Engine Arcade CD-ROM²); Saurus (SNES)
- Publishers: SNK: Hudson Soft (PC Engine Arcade CD-ROM²) Super NES; JP: Saurus; NA: Takara ADK (Neo Geo CD)
- Director: Akira Ushizawa
- Producer: Kenji Sawatari
- Designer: Kimitoshi Yokoo
- Programmer: Yuji Noguchi
- Artist: Hiroyuki Ryū
- Composers: Hideki Yamamoto; Hiroaki Shimizu; Yuka Watanabe
- Series: World Heroes
- Platforms: Arcade, Neo Geo AES, Neo Geo CD, PC Engine Arcade CD-ROM², Super NES
- Release: April 26, 1993: Arcade; WW: April 26, 1993 Neo Geo AES; WW: June 4, 1993 PC Engine Arcade CD-ROM²; JP: June 4, 1994 Super NES; JP: July 1, 1994; NA: September 1994 Neo Geo CD; JP: April 14, 1995; NA: October 1996
- Genre: Fighting
- Modes: Single-player, multiplayer
- Arcade system: Neo Geo MVS

World Heroes 2 (Note: Japanese: ワールド・ヒーローズ 2, Hepburn: Wārudo Hīrōzu Tsū) is a 1993 fighting video game developed by ADK and published by SNK for the Neo Geo arcade and home platforms. It is the sequel to the 1992 fighting arcade game World Heroes, as well as the second title of the World Heroes series. It was the first game with the ADK logo labeled within the game after the developer changed from its previous name Alpha Denshi; however, the "Alpha" logo was last used on one of the arcade flyers of World Heroes 2.

It was followed by a sequel released a year later, titled World Heroes 2 Jet.

== Gameplay ==
Gameplay screenshot showcasing a match between Kotaro Fūma and Ryoko Izumo

World Heroes 2 uses most of the elements of its predecessor, such as the same three out of four button layout, movements and motion commands performed using an 8-way joystick, and the "Normal Game" and "Death Match" modes. However, the "C" button can either be used to throw when close enough to the opponent, or taunt against the opponent. New additions include six new characters, new and modified moves and fighting statistics added to the original eight playable characters returning from the first World Heroes, projectile-reflecting, counter-grabbing and a slightly faster movement. There are fourteen playable characters in all.

In "Normal Game" mode, the object is to first defeat all six playable characters introduced in World Heroes 2, then defeat four of the original eight characters introduced in the original World Heroes chosen by the game randomly. After that, the player must defeat the two bosses, Neo Geegus and Dio to win the game. The rule in each battle against a character, like in most fighting games at the time of its release, requires the players to win two-of three rounds to completely win against the opponent. If the timer runs out before anyone is knocked out, the one with the most health in his/her lifebars wins.

In "Death Match" mode, the object of this mode is the same as "Normal Game" mode, but with new stages that feature new environmental hazards and a unique lifebar called the "seesaw lifebar". Unlike most fighting games at the time, the seesaw lifebar in "Death Match" mode has a different rule. If the player hits his or her opponent, the arrow on the lifebar will move toward the opponent's side at a distance depending on certain moves performed against the opponent. If the arrow scrolls at the end of the opponent's side, he/she will have to constantly press any button to stand up as fast as possible before the referee counts to ten. If the arrow is perfectly in the middle with the time running out, the battle becomes a draw game.

== Plot ==
One year before the events of the game, Dr. Brown created the World Heroes tournament to find the strongest fighter. Due to the arrival and interference of Geegus, Dr. Brown was unable to get his answer. The tournament returns with six new fighters, all seeking the title of history's strongest fighter.

== Characters ==
New characters are marked below in bold:

- Brocken
- **Captain Kidd**
- **Dio** (final boss)
- **Erick**
- Hanzou Hattori
- Jeanne D'Arc
- **Johnny Maximum**
- Julius Carn
- Kim Dragon
- Kotaro Fuuma
- **Mudman**
- Muscle Power
- Neo-Geegus (semi-final boss)
- Rasputin
- **Ryoko Izumo**
- **Shura Nai Khanomtom**

== Development ==
According to ADK World, other famous people considered for the cast included Yagyu Jubei, Siegfried Fischbacher, Vlad Dracula, Sindbad the Sailor, Ramesses III, and Gors who was the female version of Geegus, intended sub-boss, she was scrapped due to animation issues. Other characters who didn't make the cut were an Aztec hero whose motions are that of an animal, a European fencer who rivals Jeanne D'Arc, a Native-American tribal warrioress, and a Mexican professional-wrestler who was served as the basis for Muscle Power.

Erick was conceived due to two scrapped world heroines named Ellis and Musha; One was a young Valkyrie and the other was a "Western fantasy" based character, both of them wielded blunt melee weapons. Much like the Musashi Miyamoto-based character Haohmaru who was also scrapped in the original game, Yagyu Jubei on the other hand would also later go on to also become a playable character in Samurai Shodown (1993).

== Ports and related releases ==
World Heroes 2 was later ported to the Neo Geo AES in both Japan and North America on June 4, 1993, which is identical to the Neo Geo MVS version, but designed for home gaming, just like nearly every AES versions of Neo Geo titles. World Heroes 2 was later ported to the Neo Geo CD in Japan by ADK on April 14, 1995, which everything in it is identical to the MVS and AES versions, but with arranged background music. Outside of SNK's platforms, it was first ported by Agenda with graphics handled by ADS and published by Hudson Soft to the PC Engine Super CD-ROM² exclusively in Japan on June 4, 1994, as part of a series of titles that use the Arcade Card expansion for the PC Engine Super CD-ROM² along with three Neo Geo titles also equally ported by Hudson Soft: Art of Fighting, Fatal Fury 2 and Fatal Fury Special. It features a mixture of arranged and chiptune BGM (different compared to the Neo-Geo CD version's BGM), as well as nearly identical graphics, sound effects and voice samples to the original Neo Geo versions. Later, World Heroes 2 was ported and published by Saurus to the SNES in Japan on July 1, 1994, while this specific port was later published in North America by Takara in September 1994. This port, unlike the other versions, allows players to choose the boss characters with a secret code.

On October 18, 2007, SNK Playmore added it along with its predecessor and successors to the arcade game compilation World Heroes Gorgeous: Neo Geo Online Collection Vol. 9 (ワールドヒーローズ ゴージャス) in Japan for the PlayStation 2. It was later published in North America on March 11, 2008, and on November 7, 2008, both titled as World Heroes Anthology. This compilation was reprinted as part of a series of best-sellers subtitled "The Best" in Japan on June 18, 2009. The Neo Geo AES version was later re-released on the Wii Virtual Console in Japan on November 15, 2011. Hamster Corporation re-released the game as part of their ACA Neo Geo series for the PlayStation 4, Xbox One, Nintendo Switch, Windows, Android and iOS.

== Reception ==
Reception

Review scores
Publication	Score
AllGame	3.5/5 (Neo Geo)
Electronic Gaming Monthly	(SNES) 37 / 50
Famitsu	(Neo Geo) 25 / 40
GameFan	(Neo Geo) 349 / 400 (SNES) 244 / 300
GamePro	(SNES) 17 / 20

In Japan, Game Machine listed World Heroes 2 on their June 1, 1993 issue as being the most-successful table arcade unit of the month. In North America, RePlay reported World Heroes 2 to be the fifth most-popular arcade game in May 1993, and Play Meter listed World Heroes 2 as the nineteenth most-popular arcade game in June 1993. RePlay later listed World Heroes 2 as America's top-grossing arcade software kit in July 1993.

On release, Famicom Tsūshin's four reviewers scored the Neo Geo version of the game a 25 out of 40. GameFan's four reviewers scored the Neo Geo version 349 out of 400 (average 87.25%), stating that SNK has come "closer in their quest for fighting perfection" and concluding that it is "the best Neo Geo fighting game next to Fatal Fury 2" and "is as good as SF2."

GamePro applauded the SNES version for its massive size (24 megabits) and accurate translation of the arcade game, commenting that "WH 2 is so faithful to the arcade graphics that you have to look closely to see what (if anything) was lost in the conversion." They additionally praised the game for its large selection of characters and options. Electronic Gaming Monthly's five reviews scored it 37 out of 50 (average 7.4 out of 10), calling it "another excellent conversion of an arcade game to the Super NES platform." They cited the ability to play as the boss characters and the speed settings as good bonuses.
