= World Heroes Perfect =

1995 video game

- Developer: ADK (Note: Additional work by SNK)
- Publishers: ADK: Neo Geo CD; JP: ADK; NA: SNK
- Producer: Kazuo Arai
- Designer: Takashi Hatono
- Programmers: Eiji Fukatsu; Makio Chiba
- Artists: Hajime Suzuki; Hideyuki Kusano; Misako Ohno
- Composers: Hideki Yamamoto; Hiroaki Kujirai; Hiroaki Shimizu
- Series: World Heroes
- Platforms: Arcade, Neo Geo AES, Neo Geo CD, Sega Saturn, Windows
- Release: May 25, 1995: Arcade; JP: May 25, 1995 Neo Geo AES; WW: June 30, 1995 Neo Geo CD; JP: July 21, 1995; NA: October 1996 Saturn; JP: August 9, 1996; Windows: WW: May 2, 2026
- Genre: Fighting
- Modes: Single-player, multiplayer
- Arcade system: Neo Geo MVS

World Heroes Perfect (Note: Japanese: ワールド・ヒーローズ・パーフェクト, Hepburn: Wārudo Hīrōzu Pāfekuto) is a 1995 fighting arcade game developed and published by ADK for arcades. It was originally released for the Neo Geo MVS arcade cabinet on 25 May 1995. It is the fourth and final title of the World Heroes series.

== Gameplay ==
Gameplay screenshot showcasing a match between Janne D'Arc and Captain Kidd.

In World Heroes Perfect, each character had a traditional four-button attack layout instead of the two-out-of-three pressure-sensing button attack layout as its predecessors, but also could achieve stronger attacks by pushing down two respective punch or kick buttons at the same time. Players are also able to perform weak or strong versions of special moves depending on whether they press one or both punch or kick buttons with the special move command.

New additions include a few new playable characters, as well as new and modified moves and fighting statistics added to the playable characters returning from the first three World Heroes titles. Other new features are that every character has an ABC Special Move (or "special ability") that can be activated by pressing the A, B, and C buttons at the same time. Moves vary by character, though they all require strategic use and are easy to activate, allowing for more tactical battles. For example, the character Fuuma's ABC Special allows him to fake a special move; J. Max's ABC Special allows him to catch, hold onto, and throw back projectiles; and Kim Dragon's ABC Special allows him to perform counters while blocking. Characters also can use the strongest versions of their desperation moves whenever their life bars are under 50%.

All modes from the previous titles were excluded in this version; however, the main mode is similar to the "Normal Game" modes of World Heroes and World Heroes 2, as well as the "Entry to the tournament" mode of World Heroes 2 Jet. At the start of World Heroes Perfect in the main mode, after selecting one of the sixteen playable characters (plus three unlockable ones using codes), the object is to first face several of the playable characters selected by random and fight them in random stages that take place in different historical periods. After defeating ten characters, the player will then face off against Zeus and Neo Dio. If the player defeats Neo Dio, they will be able to see their selected character's ending.

=== Characters ===
New characters are marked below in bold:

- Brocken
- Captain Kidd
- Erick
- Hanzou Hattori
- Jack
- Jeanne D'Arc
- Johnny Maximum
- Julius Carn
- Kim Dragon
- Kotarō Fūma
- Mudman
- Muscle Power
- **Neo Dio** (Note: Boss character) (New version of Dio from World Heroes 2)
- Rasputin
- Ryofu
- Ryoko Izumo
- Shura Nai Khanomtom
- **Son Gokū**
- Zeus

== Plot ==
One year after the conclusion of the World Heroes Battle Fest, Dr. Brown sends invitations to the 16 fighters, informing them of a new World Heroes tournament, that would finally settle the question of who is the strongest fighter in history. With the 16 fighters preparing themselves, Zeus seeks revenge against those who had caused his downfall. Little does Zeus or the fighters know that an old enemy is back; also desiring revenge.

== Ports and related releases ==
World Heroes Perfect was ported to the Neo Geo AES in both Japan and North America on 30 June 1995. Like most AES versions of Neo Geo titles, it is the same as the Neo Geo MVS version. This version was added to the Wii's Virtual Console in Japan on January 11, 2011, in North America on July 26, 2012, and in the PAL region on October 18, 2012. World Heroes Perfect was ported and published in Japan by ADK to the Neo Geo CD on July 21, 1995, and published in North America by SNK on the same date. Everything in the Neo Geo CD version is identical to the MVS and AES versions, with the exception of replacing FM chiptune background music with arranged versions, plus a few exclusive modes. This is also the only title in the series to have a Neo-Geo CD port released outside Japan.

Outside of SNK's platforms, it was ported to the Sega Saturn. This port was reprogrammed by ADK and published by SNK exclusively in Japan on 9 August 1996. This port has the traditional Arcade mode, the VS. mode, and a CPU VS. mode, and uses the same arranged background music as the Neo-Geo CD port. It also includes some official artworks from all four World Heroes titles and is the only version of the game where Zeus is a selectable character.

On October 18, 2007, SNK Playmore added it, along with its predecessors, to the arcade game compilation World Heroes Gorgeous: Neo Geo Online Collection Vol. 9 (ワールドヒーローズ ゴージャス) in Japan for the PlayStation 2. It was later released in North America on 11 March and 7 November 2008, both titled as World Heroes Anthology. This compilation was re-released as part of a series of best-sellers, subtitled "The Best", in Japan on June 18, 2009.

Hamster Corporation re-released the game as part of their ACA Neo Geo series for the PlayStation 4, Xbox One, Nintendo Switch, Windows, Android and iOS.

World Heroes Perfect was ported to Windows via Steam on May 2, 2026, as part of "NEO GEO Premium Selection" by SNK. This port contains various quality-of-life modern updates such as rollback netcode with nine-player lobbies, Practice Mode, classic artwork in the gallery mode, achievements and toggle for hidden characters.

== Reception ==
Contemporary reception

Review scores
Publication	Score
AllGame	3.5/5 (Neo Geo)
Computer and Video Games	76/100 (Arcade); 2/5 (Saturn)
Electronic Gaming Monthly	8.5/10 (Neo Geo)
Next Generation	2/5 (Neo Geo)
Consoles +	85% (Neo Geo CD)
Hobby Consolas	92/100 (Neo Geo)
Hobby Hi-Tech	7/10 (Neo Geo CD)
MAN!AC	69% (Neo Geo)
Player One	89% (Neo Geo CD)
Sega Saturn Magazine (JP)	8.0/10 (Saturn)
Super Game Power	3.8/5.0 (Neo Geo)
Superjuegos	84/100 (Neo Geo CD)
Video Games	73% (Saturn)
VideoGames	9/10 (Neo Geo)

Award
Publication	Award
GamePro (1995)	Best Neo•Geo Game

In Japan, Game Machine listed World Heroes Perfect as the second most-successful arcade game of July 1995. According to Famitsu, the AES and Neo Geo CD versions sold over 6,044 and 28,766 copies in their first week on the market respectively.

Reviewing the Neo Geo home version, GamePro stated that it is "almost perfect." While expressing some disappointment that it was only an upgrade of the previous installment, they praised the game for adding new special moves and fixing most of the problems with World Heroes 2 Jet. They concluded that "World Heroes Perfect almost lives up to its title." GamePro later awarded it Best Neo-Geo Game of 1995. Electronic Gaming Monthly scored it an 8.5 out of 10, citing the improved audio, graphics, and playability over previous games in the series, as well as the new moves that they said add considerable depth to the game. Ed Semrad and Al Manuel both said it was by far the best game in the World Heroes series to date. They later stated that, while "not quite perfect, this game is still good." Next Generation reviewed the Neo-Geo version of the game, rating it two stars out of five, and stated that "World Heroes Perfect is best left for fighting game enthusiasts and those gamers without any other fighting games in their current library."

=== Retrospective reviews ===
Retrospective assessments

Aggregate score
Aggregator	Score
Metacritic	58/100 (Switch)

Review scores
Publication	Score
Nintendo Life	7/10 (Wii); 7/10 (Switch)
Nintendo World Report	5/10 (Switch)
Bonus Stage	6/10 (Switch)
Cubed3	5/10 (Switch)
Digitally Downloaded	3/5 (Switch)

World Heroes Perfect has been met with a more mixed outlook from reviewers in recent years.
