= War of Aero =

1993 video game

- Developer: Allumer
- Publisher: Allumer
- Platform: Arcade
- Release: JP: 1993
- Genre: Scrolling shooter
- Modes: Single-player, multiplayer

War of Aero: Project MEIOU (Note: Japanese: ウォーオブエアロ, Hepburn: Wō Obu Earo) is a 1993 vertically scrolling shooter video game developed and published by Allumer for arcades, and distributed in Hong Kong by Yang Cheng.

Hamster Corporation acquired the game's rights alongside Allumer's catalogue, releasing the game outside Japan for the first time as part of their Arcade Archives series for the Nintendo Switch and PlayStation 4 in February 2024.

== Gameplay ==
The player controls fighter jets which battle swarms of mechanical enemies across 16 stages. Players can unlock numerous types of pods through power-ups, which fire ammunition that differ in attack range and power, as well as being able to shoot behind the player. Unique to the game, two players can combine their jets to form a more powerful fighter jet, which can be controlled by both players at a relatively slower movement speed.
