= World Heroes 2 Jet =

1994 video game

- Developers: ADK; Be Top (Game Boy)
- Publishers: SNK: Game Boy; JP/EU: Takara; NA: Playmates Interactive
- Director: Akira Ushizawa
- Producer: Kazuo Arai
- Designer: Kenji Sawatari
- Programmer: Yoshiki Ono
- Artists: Hideyuki Yamada; Kazushige Hakamata; Masato Mitsuya
- Composers: Hideki Yamamoto; Hiroaki Shimizu; Yuka Watanabe
- Series: World Heroes
- Platforms: Arcade, Game Boy, Neo Geo AES, Neo Geo CD
- Release: April 26, 1994: Arcade; WW: April 26, 1994 Neo Geo AES; WW: June 10, 1994 Neo Geo CD; JP: November 11, 1994; NA: October 1996 Game Boy; JP: February 24, 1995; NA: August 1995; EU: 1995
- Genre: Fighting
- Modes: Single-player, multiplayer
- Arcade system: Neo Geo MVS

World Heroes 2 Jet (Note: Japanese: ワールド・ヒーローズ2ジェット, Hepburn: Wārudo Hīrōzu 2 Jetto) is a 1994 fighting video game developed by ADK and published by SNK for the Neo Geo arcade and home platforms. It is the sequel and update to the 1993 fighting arcade game World Heroes 2, as well as the third title of the World Heroes series.

It was followed by a sequel released over a year later titled World Heroes Perfect.

== Gameplay ==
Gameplay screenshot showcasing a match between Ryoko Izumo and Janne D'Arc

World Heroes 2 Jet shares many elements with its predecessor, such as the same three out of four button layout ("A" to punch, "B" to kick, and "C" to either throw or "Challenge", which is taunting), movements and motion commands performed using an 8-way joystick. New additions include three new characters and new and modified moves and fighting statistics added to the playable characters returning from the first two World Heroes titles. Also, the word "Jet" in the title not only refers to faster movement, but also the ability to perform forward and backward dashing. Another new addition is when two attacks hit each other, they will rebound. The "Normal Game" and "Death Match" modes are replaced by "Entry to the tournament" and "The FORGING OF WARRIORS":

In "Entry to the tournament", the objective is to first face four groups that have three opponents per group, and defeat at least two out of three opponents per group. Second, the player must defeat Captain Kidd in at least two of three rounds. Third, the player must defeat Hanzou the same way. Finally, the player must defeat Zeus' henchmen Jack and Ryofu before defeating Zeus himself.

In "The FORGING OF WARRIORS", the player selects an opponent to fight against. Each battle against a character, like in most fighting games at the time of its release, requires the player to win two out of three rounds to completely win against the opponent. If the timer runs out before anyone is knocked out, the competitor with fuller lifebars wins. Once the player wins or loses, the player returns to the "Player Select" and "Enemy Select" screens. However, after winning against four opponents in a row, the game ends. This is the only mode in which two players can play against each other. Depending on what CPU-controlled opponent or second player's character is chosen, the stage both players will fight on will be the second character's stage from World Heroes 2; however, for characters introduced in World Heroes 2 Jet, the battle would take place on their stages exclusively shown in this mode.

== Plot ==
After the defeat of both Dio and Neo Geegus at the end of World Heroes 2, the world was saved from the threatening danger and that the 14 fighters who had participated in the World Heroes tournament had returned to their own respective time periods. However, one year later, the 14 fighters had received invitations to a new fighting tournament known as the World Heroes Battle Fest and that this tournament would take place over the next five days in different parts of the world, being watched by millions of fighting fans. Surprisingly, the 14 fighters learn that Dr. Brown is not the one who is sponsoring the tournament, but rather, a mysterious millionaire who is known simply as Mr. Z to the public. As the 14 fighters prepare themselves for the World Heroes Battle Fest, all of them have no clue or idea that Mr. Z has his own callous ambition for world domination and with the assistance of his two loyal servants, he vows to eliminate anyone who dares to get in his ruthless way.

== Characters ==
New characters are marked below in bold:

- Brocken
- Captain Kidd
- Erick
- Hanzou Hattori
- **Jack** (Note: Sub-Boss)
- Jeanne D'Arc
- Johnny Maximum
- Julius Carn
- Kim Dragon
- Kotarō Fūma
- Mudman
- Muscle Power
- Rasputin
- **Ryofu**
- Ryoko Izumo
- Shura Nai Khanomtom
- **Zeus** (Note: Final Boss)

== Ports and related releases ==
World Heroes 2 Jet was later ported to the Neo Geo AES in both Japan and North America on June 10, 1994, which is the same as the Neo Geo MVS version like nearly every AES versions of Neo Geo titles. World Heroes 2 Jet was later ported to the Neo Geo CD exclusively in Japan by ADK on November 11, 1994. Outside of SNK's platforms, it became the first and only title of the series to receive a port on a handheld, which was reprogrammed by Betop and published by Takara for the Nintendo Game Boy with Super Game Boy features added to it, as well as characters being super deformed due to the handheld platform's screen being small. This port was first released in Japan as Nettō World Heroes 2 Jet (熱闘ワールドヒーローズ2 ジェト) on February 24, 1995, as part of Takara's Nettō Dead Heat Fighters (熱闘DEAD HEAT FIGHTERS) series of Game Boy conversions of arcade fighting games that mostly include Neo-Geo fighting games and Battle Arena Toshinden. The Game Boy port was later released in North America by Playmates Interactive the same year in August, but without "Nettou" added to the title.

On October 18, 2007, SNK Playmore added it along with its predecessors and successor to the arcade game compilation World Heroes Gorgeous: Neo Geo Online Collection Vol. 9 (ワールドヒーローズ ゴージャス) in Japan for the PlayStation 2. It was later published in North America on March 11, 2008, and in Europe on November 7, 2008, both titled as World Heroes Anthology. This compilation was reprinted as part of a series of best-sellers subtitled "The Best" in Japan on June 18, 2009. It was also released in the Wii Virtual Console. Hamster Corporation re-released the game as part of their ACA Neo Geo series for the PlayStation 4, Xbox One, Nintendo Switch, Windows, Android and iOS.

== Reception ==
Reception

Review scores
| Publication | Score |
|---|---|
| Electronic Gaming Monthly | 8.25 / 10 (Neo Geo); 7.875 / 10 (Game Boy) |
| Famitsu | 26 / 40 (Neo Geo); 24 / 40 (Game Boy) |

Award
| Publication | Award |
|---|---|
| Electronic Gaming Monthly | Game of the Month, Editors' Choice Gold |

In Japan, Game Machine listed World Heroes 2 Jet on their June 1, 1994 issue as being the third most-successful table arcade unit of the month. In North America, RePlay reported World Heroes 2 Jet to be the fifth most-popular arcade game at the time. Play Meter also listed the game to be the twenty-eighth most-popular arcade game at the time.

On release, Electronic Gaming Monthly gave the Neo Geo version their "Game of the Month" and "Editors' Choice Gold" awards, citing the sharp graphics, stereo sound, improved controls, and large number of added features. Reviewing the Neo Geo version, GamePro praised the added tournament mode and new moves but criticized the absence of death match mode and the slow-paced gameplay, concluding that "Even though Jet has more depth than previous Heroes, it's still missing the defining elements of an SF II-quality game, such as a true four-button configuration, ... tightly balanced game play, and extremely likable characters."

Electronic Gaming Monthly and GamePro both gave the Game Boy version rave reviews, with EGM reviewer Sushi-X commenting, "I could not believe a fighting game would ever work for the portables, but this one does." Both magazines cited the sounds as the one weak point, and particularly applauded the inclusion of all the characters, the attractiveness of the graphics, and the responsiveness of the controls.
