= Neo Geo =

Arcade system and home video game console

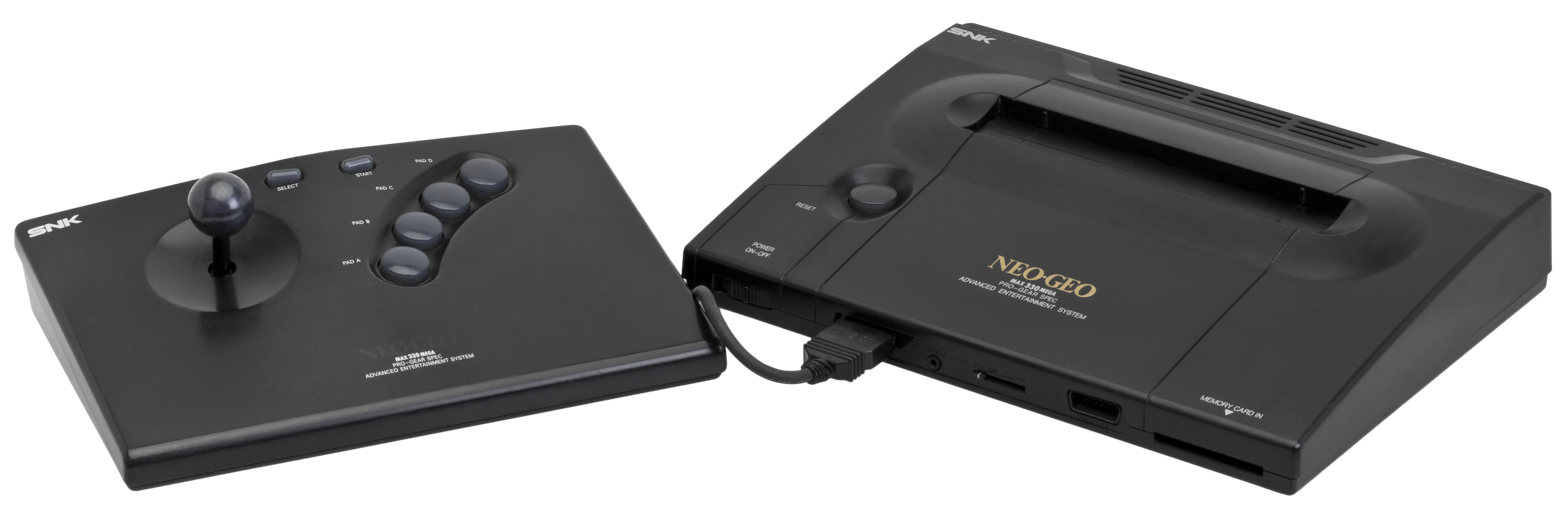
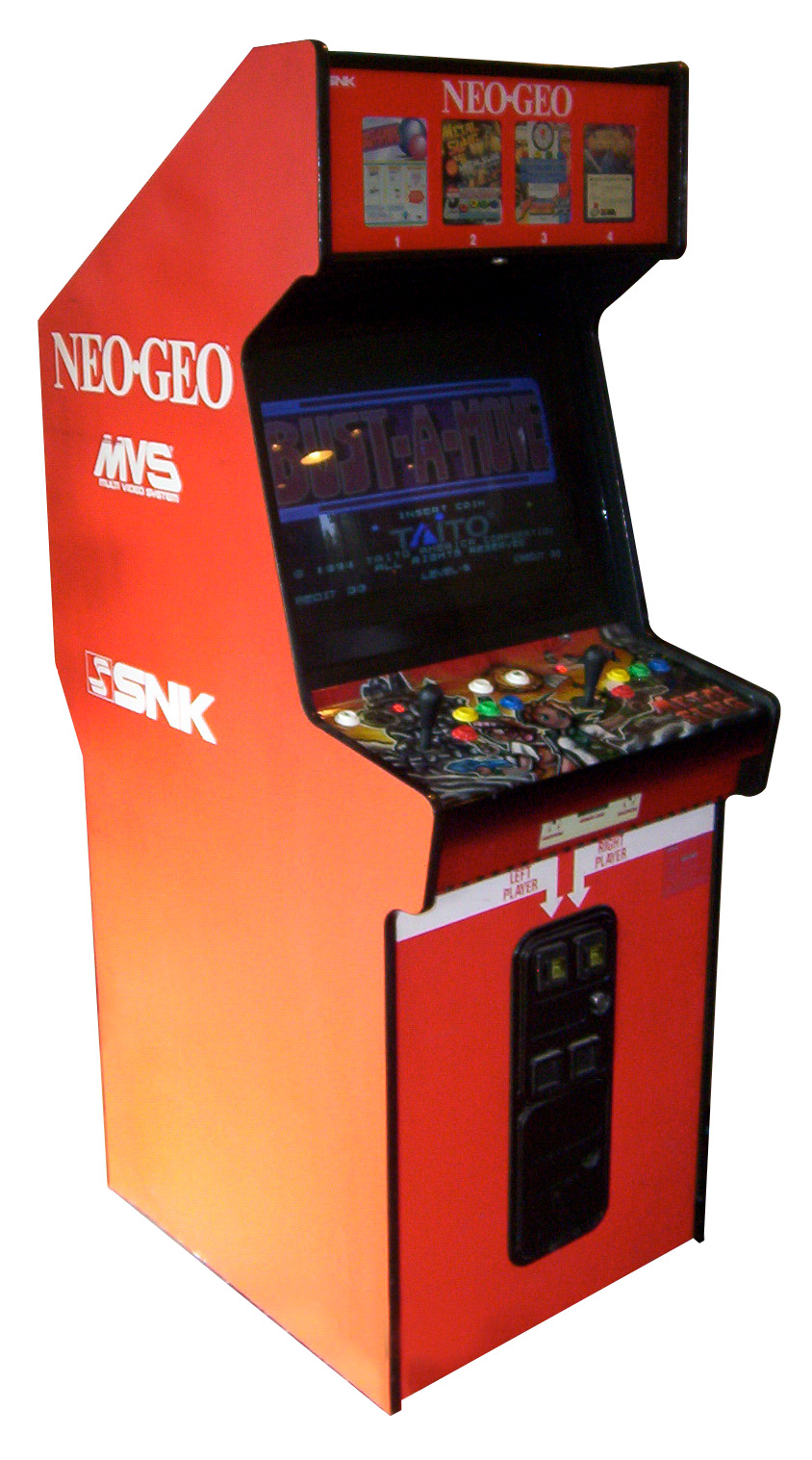
- Neo Geo AES console (top) and 4-slot MVS arcade cabinet (bottom)
- Manufacturer: SNK Corporation
- Type: Arcade system board Home video game console
- Generation: Fourth
- Released: April 16, 1990: JP: April 16, 1990 (MVS); JP: April 26, 1990 (AES); NA: August 22, 1990 (MVS); AU: August 1990 (MVS); NA: July 1, 1991 (AES); EU: 1991
- Introductory price: US$649.99
- Discontinued: 1997 (AES), 2004 (MVS)
- Units sold: 1 million (MVS); 410,000 (AES)
- Media: ROM cartridge
- CPU: Motorola 68000 @ 12 MHz; Zilog Z80A @ 4 MHz
- Memory: 64 KB RAM, 84 KB VRAM, 2 KB sound memory
- Storage: Memory card
- Display: 320×224 resolution, 3840 on-screen colors out of a palette of 65536
- Sound: Yamaha YM2610
- Power: 8 W older systems 5 W newer systems
- Dimensions: 325 × 237 × 60 mm (12.8 × 9.3 × 2.4 inches)
- Best-selling game: Samurai Shodown
- Successor: Neo Star (cancelled); Hyper Neo Geo 64

The Neo Geo (Note: Japanese: ネオジオ, romanized: Neojio) (Greek for 'New World'), stylized as NEO•GEO, is a video game platform released in 1990 by Japanese game company SNK Corporation. It was initially released in two ROM cartridge-based formats: an arcade system board (Multi Video System; MVS) and a home video game console (Advanced Entertainment System; AES). A CD-ROM-based home console iteration, the Neo Geo CD, was released in 1994. The arcade system can hold multiple cartridges that can be exchanged out, a unique feature that contrasted to the dedicated single-game arcade cabinets of its time, making it popular with arcade operators.

The Neo Geo was marketed as the first 24-bit system; its CPU is actually a 16/32-bit 68000 with an 8-bit Z80 coprocessor, while its GPU chipset has a 24-bit graphics data bus. It was a very powerful system when released, more so than any video game console at the time, and many arcade systems such as rival Capcom's CPS, which did not surpass it until the CP System II in 1993.

The Neo Geo AES was originally released solely as a rental console for video game stores in Japan called the Neo Geo Rental System, with its high manufacturing costs causing SNK not to release it for retail sale. This was later reversed due to high demand and it was released at retail as a luxury console. Adjusted for inflation, it was the most expensive home video game console ever released at the time, costing US$649.99 (equivalent to $1,540 in 2025). The AES had identical hardware to the MVS, allowing home users to play the games exactly as they were in the arcades; however, cartridges are not inter-compatible due to different physical sizes, meaning that software releases differed for the two systems.

The Neo Geo MVS was a success during the 1990s due to the cabinet's low cost, multiple cartridge slots, and compact size. Several successful video game series were released for the platform, such as Fatal Fury, Art of Fighting, Samurai Shodown, World Heroes, The King of Fighters, Twinkle Star Sprites and Metal Slug; game software production lasted until 2004, making Neo Geo the longest-supported arcade system of all time. The AES had a very niche market in Japan, though sales were very low in the U.S. due to its high price for both the hardware and software, but it has since gained a cult following and is now considered a collectable. Worldwide, one million Neo Geo MVS units (Note: As of April 1997) and 410,000 Neo Geo AES units were sold. (Note: As of March 1997)

== History ==
=== Development ===
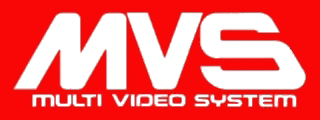
Logo used for the MVS (Multi Video System)

Neo Geo logo

The Neo Geo hardware was an evolution of an older SNK/Alpha Denshi M68000 arcade platform that was used in Time Soldiers in 1987, further developed in the SNK M68000 hardware platform as used for P.O.W.: Prisoners of War in 1988. Contrary to other popular arcade hardware of the time, the SNK/Alpha Denshi hardware used sprite strips instead of the more common tilemap-based backgrounds. The Neo Geo hardware was essentially developed by Alpha Denshi's Eiji Fukatsu, adding sprite scaling through the use of scaling tables stored in ROM as well as support for a much higher amount of data on cartridges and better sound hardware. The system's hardware specifications were finalized in December 1989.

Takashi Nishiyama left Capcom, where he had created the fighting game Street Fighter (1987), to join SNK after they invited him to join the company. There, he was involved in developing the Neo Geo. He proposed the concept of an arcade system that uses ROM cartridges like a game console, and also proposed a home console version of the system. His reasons for these proposals were to make the system cheaper for markets such as China, Hong Kong, Taiwan, Southeast Asia, Central America, and South America, where it was difficult to sell dedicated arcade games due to piracy. Nishiyama also created the Fatal Fury fighting game franchise, as a spiritual successor to the original Street Fighter. He also worked on the fighting game franchises Art of Fighting and The King of Fighters, as well as the run and gun video game series Metal Slug.

=== Release ===
The Neo Geo was announced and demonstrated on January 31, 1990, in Osaka, Japan. SNK exhibited several Neo Geo games at Japan's Amusement Machine Operators' Union (AOU) show in February 1990, including NAM-1975, Magician Lord, Baseball Stars Professional, Top Player's Golf and Riding Hero. The Neo Geo then made its overseas debut at Chicago's American Coin Machine Exposition (ACME) in March 1990, with several games demonstrated. The system was then released in Japan on April 16, 1990. Initially, the AES home system was only available for rent to commercial establishments, such as hotel chains, bars and restaurants. When customer response indicated that some gamers were willing to buy a US$650 console, SNK expanded sales and marketing into the home console market in 1991.

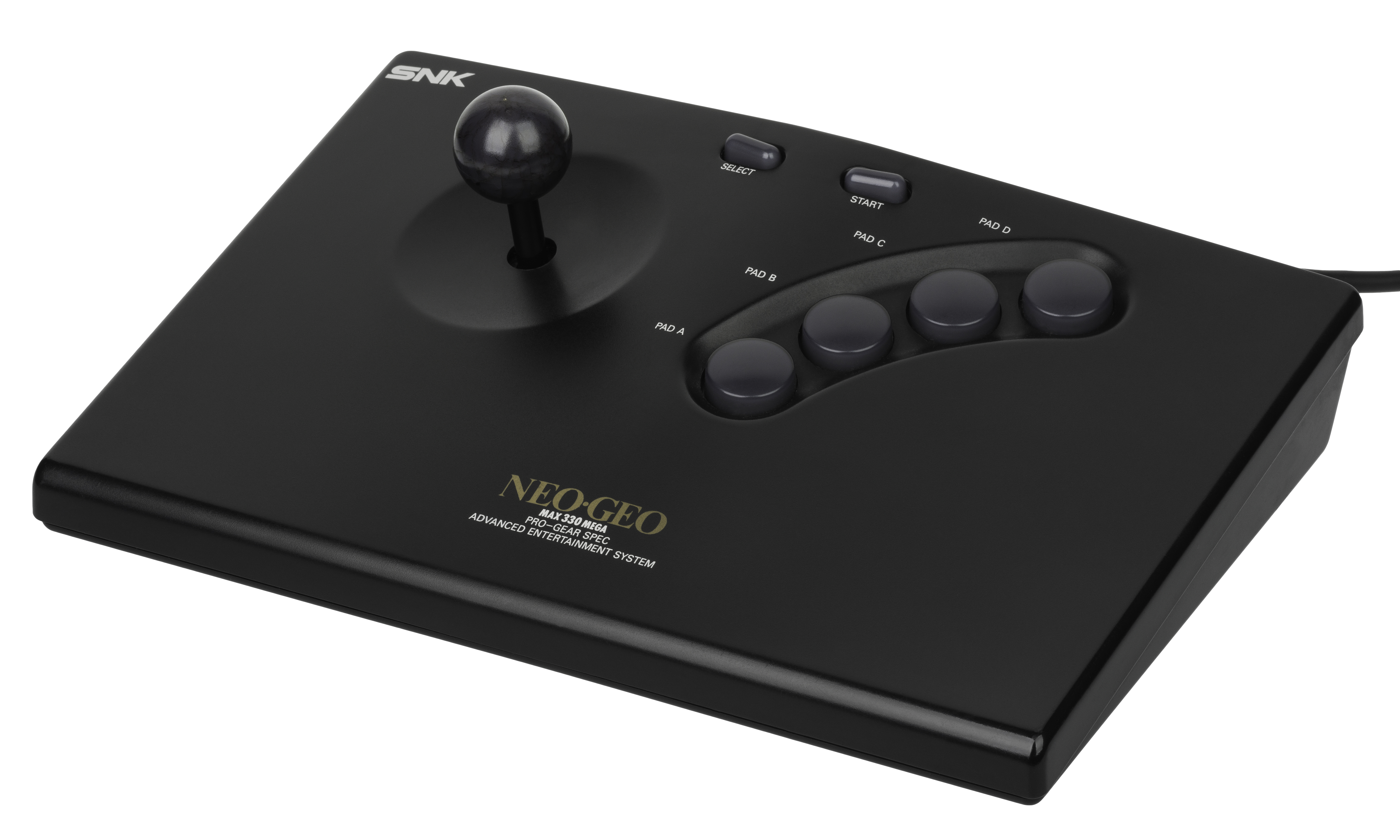
The Neo Geo AES shipped with large, arcade-style controllers.

The Neo Geo's graphics and sound are largely superior to other contemporary home consoles, computers (such as the X68000) and even some arcade systems. Unlike earlier systems, the Neo Geo AES was intended to reproduce the same quality of the game as the arcade MVS system. The MVS was one of the most powerful arcade units at the time, allowing the game ROM to be loaded from interchangeable cartridges instead of using custom, dedicated hardware for each game.

In the United States, the console's debut price was planned to be US$599 and included two joystick controllers and a game: either Baseball Stars Professional or NAM-1975. However, the price was raised and its American launch debuted as the Gold System at US$649.99 (equivalent to $1,536 in 2025). Later, the Gold System was bundled with Magician Lord and Fatal Fury. The Silver System package, launched at US$399.99, included one joystick controller and no pack-in game. Other games were launched at about US$200 and up. At double or quadruple the price of the competition, the console and its games were accessible only to a niche market. However, its full compatibility meant that no additional money was being spent on porting or marketing for the AES, since the MVS' success was automatically feeding the AES, making the console profitable for SNK.

=== Lifetime and discontinuation ===
In January 1991, Romstar released an arcade conversion kit version of the Neo Geo in the United States, allowing the conversion of an arcade cabinet into a Neo Geo system. The same month, the Neo Geo home console version made its North American debut at the Consumer Electronics Show (CES). SNK also announced that there would generally be a roughly six-month gap between the arcade and home releases of Neo Geo games.

When real-time 3D graphics became the norm in the arcade industry, the Neo Geo's 2D hardware was unable to produce them. Despite this, Neo Geo arcade games retained profitability through the mid-1990s, and the system was one of three 1995 recipients of the American Amusement Machine Association's Diamond Awards (which are based strictly on sales achievements). SNK developed a new home console in 1994, called the Neo Geo CD. A new arcade system was also made in 1997, called Hyper Neo Geo 64. However, these two systems had low popularity and only a few games.

While it ceased manufacturing home consoles by the end of 1997, SNK continued making software for the original 2D Neo Geo. Despite being very aged by the end of the decade, the Neo Geo continued getting popular releases, such as the critically acclaimed The King of Fighters 2002. The last official game by SNK for the Neo Geo system, Samurai Shodown V Special, was released in 2004, 14 years after the system's introduction.

On August 31, 2007, SNK stopped offering maintenance and repairs to Neo Geo home consoles, handhelds, and games. The Neo Geo X Gold entertainment system was released on December 6, 2012. The system was a licensed, limited-edition bundle created by Tommo and SNK Playmore to celebrate the 20th anniversary of the original Neo Geo AES. It included a handheld console with 20 pre-loaded AES classics, a docking station modeled after the original AES console, and an arcade-style joystick. The Neo Geo X (NGX) is a hybrid video game console manufactured by Tommo, licensed by SNK Playmore and released on December 18, 2012. It features games that were popular on the original Neo Geo hardware and comes built-in with 20 original Neo Geo games, with additional titles available on game cards.

== Technical specifications ==
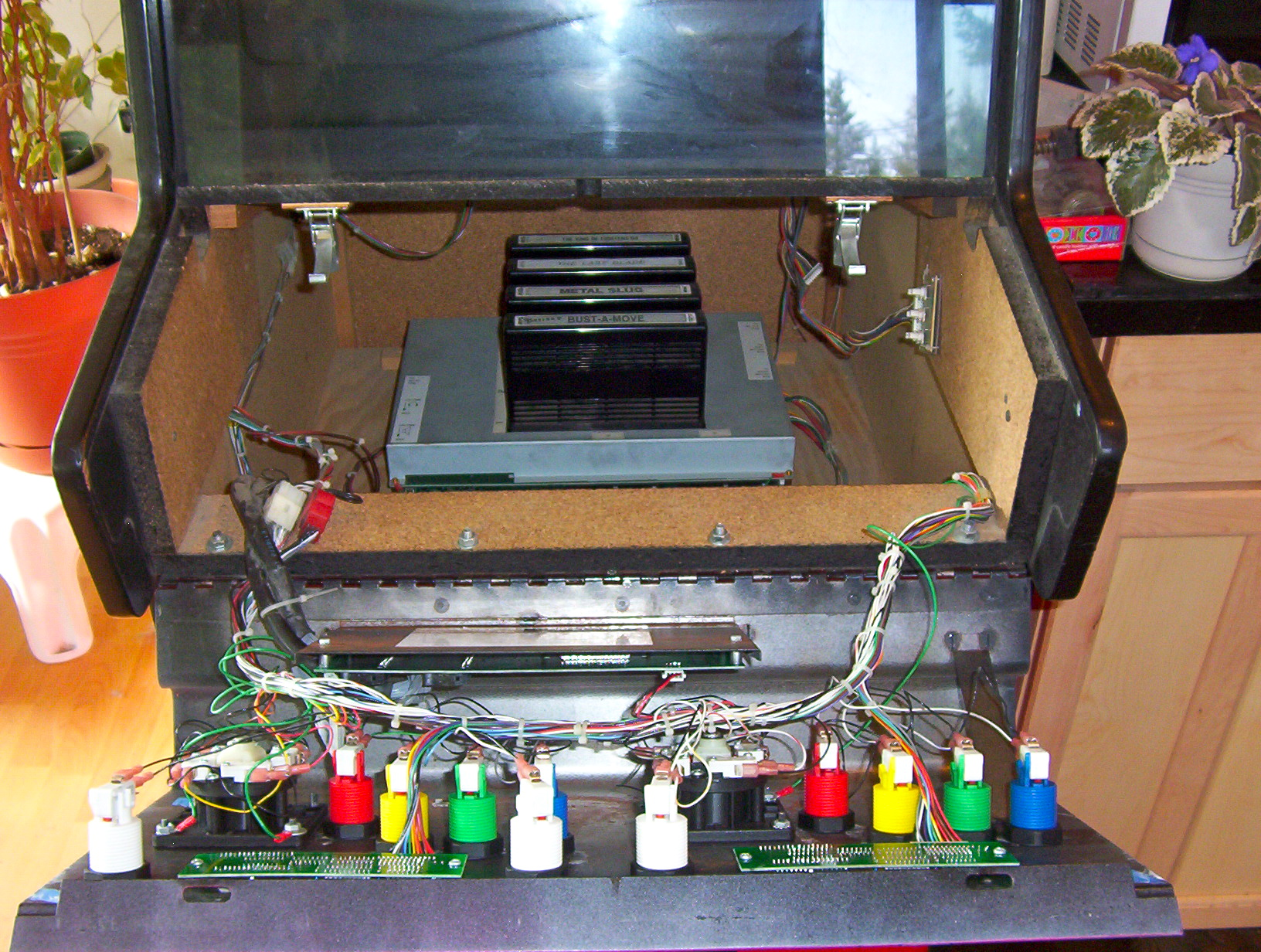
Inside a four cartridge Neo Geo arcade machine

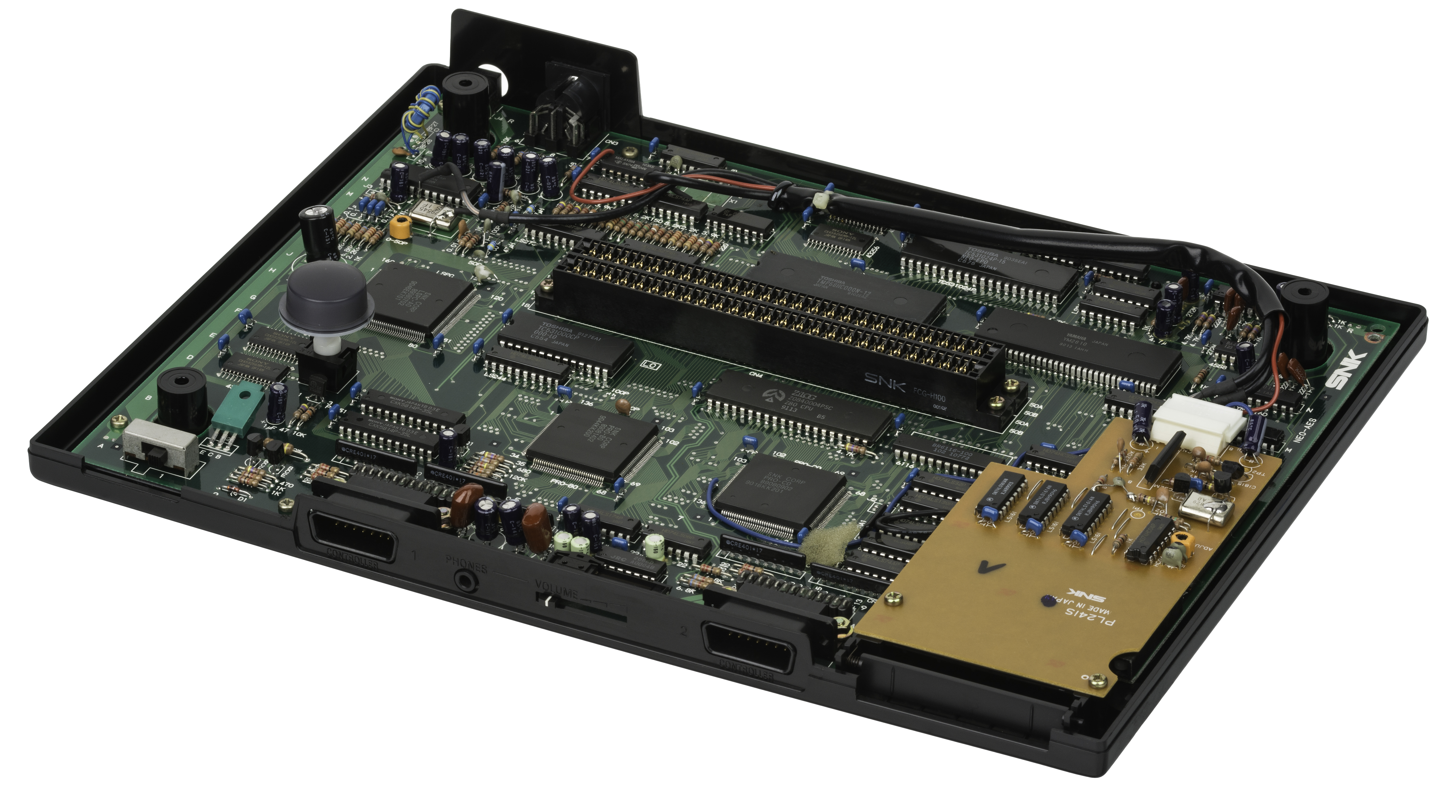
Neo Geo AES motherboard

Each joystick controller is 280 mm (width) × 190 mm (depth) × 95 mm (height) (11 × 8 × 2.5 in.) and contains the same four-button layout as the arcade MVS cabinet.

The arcade machines have a memory card system by which a player could save a game to return to at a later time and could also be used to continue play on the SNK home console of the same name.

The arcade version of the video game hardware is often referred to as the "MVS", or Multi Video System (available in 1-slot, 2-slot, 4-slot, and 6-slot variations, differing in the amount of game cartridges loaded into the machine at the time), with its console counterpart referred to as the "AES", or Advanced Entertainment System. Early motherboard revisions contain daughterboards, used to enhance the clarity of the video output.

The MVS and AES hardware can execute identical machine code. Owners can move EPROMs from one type to the other, and the game will still run. The program specifics for both MVS and AES game options are contained on every game ROM, whether the cartridge is intended for home or arcade use. However, the arcade and home cartridges do have a different pinout. They were designed this way to prevent arcade operators from buying the cheaper home carts and then using them in arcades. In a few home version games, the arcade version of the game can be unlocked by inputting a special code.

=== ROM sizes and startup screens ===
The original specification for ROM size is up to 330 megabits, hence the system displaying "Max 330 Mega Pro-Gear Spec" upon startup. While no technical advances were required to achieve it, some games over 100 megabits, such as Top Hunter, followed this screen by displaying an animation proclaiming "The 100Mega Shock!". The original ROM size specification was later enhanced on cartridges with bank switching memory technology, increasing the maximum cartridge size to around 716 megabits. These new cartridges also cause the system to display "Giga Power Pro-Gear Spec" upon startup or during attract mode, indicating this enhancement.

The 100Mega Shock!

Giga Power

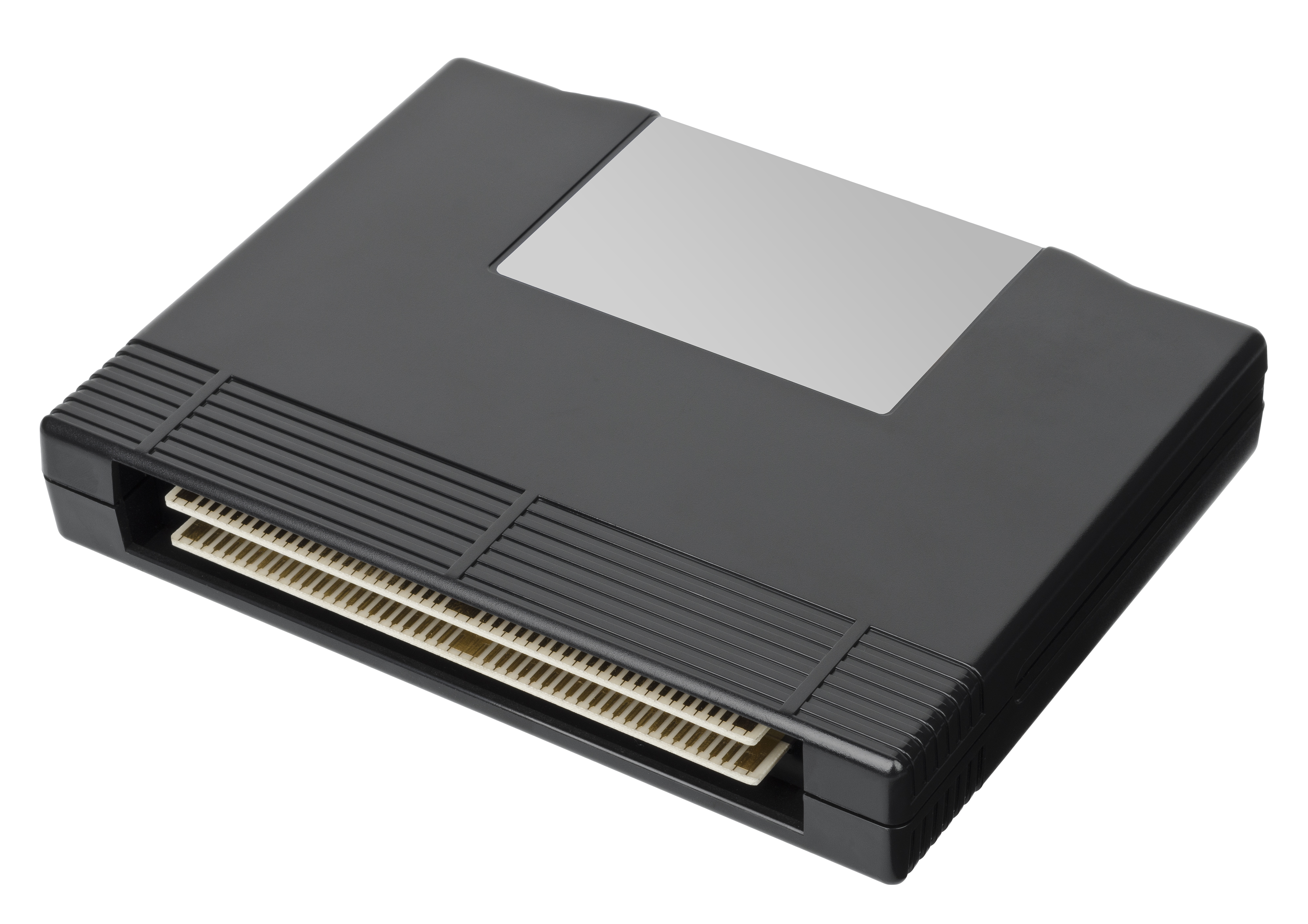
The game cartridges measure 19 cm (7.5 in) by 14 cm (5.5 in) by 2.5 cm (0.98 in).

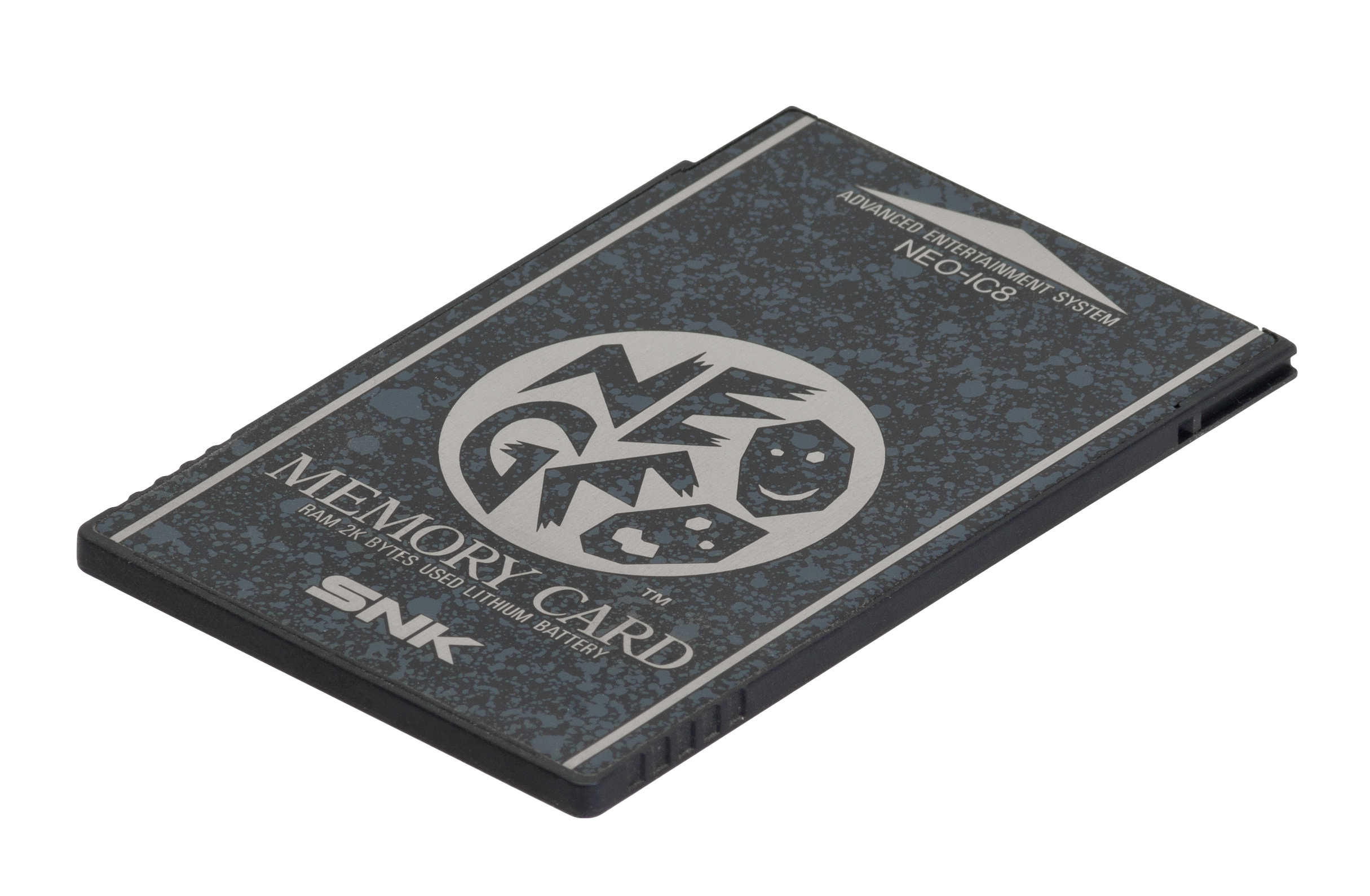
Neo Geo Memory Card

The system uses seven different specialist processors, which divide the workload for the visuals, audio and gameplay.

=== Processors ===
- CPU: Motorola 68000 (often a second sourced version, usually by Toshiba or Hitachi, initially a Hitachi HD68HC000PS12) @ 12 MHz (16/32-bit instructions @ 1.75 MIPS)
- Coprocessor: Zilog Z80 @ 4 MHz (also used as audio controller) (8/16-bit instructions @ 0.58 MIPS)

=== Memory ===
RAM: 214 KB SRAM

- Main 68000 RAM: 64 KB (32 KB SRAM ×2)
- Video RAM: 84 KB SRAM
  - Main VRAM: 64 KB (32 KB SRAM ×2)
  - Palette memory: 16 KB (8 KB SRAM ×2)
  - Fast video sprite RAM: 4 KB (2 KB SRAM ×2)
- Z80 sound RAM: 2 KB SRAM
- Battery-backup save NVRAM: 64 KB SRAM

On-board ROM: 512 KB

- Zoom look-up table: 128 KB
- Fix layer graphics: 128 KB
- Z80 sound: 128 KB
- 68000 BIOS: 128 KB

=== Display ===
The die of the SNK LSPC2-A2

The SNK custom video chipset allows the system to draw sprites in vertical strips of tiles (blocks of 16x16 pixels) that can be 32 tiles tall (total of 512 pixels); it can draw up to 380 sprites on the screen at a time, with the limitation of 96 sprites per scanline. Each tile can be assigned a palette, which defines 15 colors (+ transparency). Allowing up to 256 palettes at the same time, the system can display 3840 colors simultaneously. Unlike most other video game consoles of its time, the Neo Geo does not use scrolling tilemap background layers. Instead, it has a single non-scrolling tilemap layer called the fix layer, while any scrolling layers rely exclusively on drawing sprites to create the scrolling backgrounds (like the Sega Y Board). By laying multiple sprites side by side, the system can simulate a tilemap background layer. The Neo Geo sprite system represents a step between conventional sprites and tilemaps.

- GPU chipset:
  - SNK LSPC2-A2 (line sprite generator & VRAM interface) @ 24 MHz
  - SNK PRO-B0 (palette arbiter)
  - SNK PRO-A0, NEO-B1, NEO-GRC
- GPU graphics data bus: 24-bit
- Display resolution: 320×224 px (many games only use the centermost 304 px), progressive scan
- Color palette: 65,536 (16-bit) (not RGB565, but RGB666, where the lowest bit of each channel is shared, being common to the three RGB components)
- Maximum colors on screen: 3840
- Maximum sprites on screen: 380
- Minimum sprite size: 16×16 px
- Maximum sprite size: 16×512 px
- Maximum sprites per scanline: 96
- Maximum sprite pixels per scanline: 1536 px
- Static tilemap plane: 1 (512×256 px fix layer)
- Aspect ratio: 4:3
- A/V output: RF, composite video/RCA audio, RGB (with separate 21 pin RGB cable FCG-9, or European standard RGB SCART cable).

=== Sound ===
The onboard Yamaha YM2610 sound chip provides 14 channels of sound.

- Sound chip: Yamaha YM2610
- 4 concurrent FM synthesis channels (voices), four operators per channel
- 3 SSG channels
- 7 pulse-code modulation (PCM) channels
  - ADPCM-A: 6 ADPCM channels, 18.5 kHz sampling rate, 12-bit audio depth
  - ADPCM-B: 1 ADPCM channel, 1.85–55.5 kHz sampling rate, 16-bit audio depth
- 2 interval timers
- 1 low frequency oscillator (LFO)
- Sound/Work RAM: 2 KB
- Sound ROM: 128 KB on-board (only less than 32 KB used), up to 512 KB sound ROM on cartridges

=== Other ===
Power

- Source: separate DC 5 V (older systems) and DC 9 V adapter (newer systems).
- Consumption: 8 W older systems, 5 W newer systems

Dimensions

- Console: 325 mm (width) × 237 mm (depth) × 60 mm (height)
- Controller: 280 mm (width) × 190 mm (depth) × 95 mm (height)

Console storage

- Removable memory card: 2 KB or 68-pin JEIDA ver. 3 spec memory. Any 68-pin memory that fits the JEIDA version 3 spec will work.

Arcade storage

- Removable memory card: 68-pin. Cartridge is composed of two PCBs.

== Reception ==
The Neo Geo MVS was a worldwide commercial success upon release in arcades, becoming one of the highest-earning machines at various arcades across markets such as North America and Australia in 1990. In North America, three Neo Geo games were later among the ten top-grossing arcade software conversion kits in December 1992: Art of Fighting at number one, World Heroes at number two, and King of the Monsters 2 at number ten. The Neo Geo MVS received Diamond awards from the American Amusement Machine Association (AAMA) two years in a row, for being among America's top four best-selling arcade machines of 1992 (with Street Fighter II: Champion Edition, Mortal Kombat and Terminator 2) and 1993. In 1994, the Neo Geo MVS was best-selling arcade printed circuit board (PCB) worldwide.

In the 1990 Gamest Awards, the Neo Geo received the Special Award. At the 1991 AMOA Awards held by the Amusement & Music Operators Association (AMOA), the Neo Geo won the "Most Innovative New Technology" award.

In a 1993 review, GamePro gave the Neo Geo CD a "thumbs up". Though they voiced several criticisms, noting that the system was not as powerful as the soon-to-launch 3DO and had few releases which were not fighting games, they generally praised both the hardware and games library and recommended that gamers who could not afford the console (which was still priced at $649.99) play the games in the arcade.

=== Legacy ===
The Neo Geo is the first home game console to feature a removable memory card for saved games.

The GameTap subscription service has included a Neo Geo emulator and a small library of Neo Geo games. In 2007, Nintendo announced that Neo Geo games would appear on the Wii's Virtual Console, in partnership with D4 Enterprise, starting with Fatal Fury: King of Fighters, Art of Fighting, The King of Fighters '94, and World Heroes. Neo Geo games were released through Xbox Live Arcade and PlayStation Network (for the PlayStation 3, the service was called NEOGEO Station), including Fatal Fury Special, Samurai Shodown II, Metal Slug 3, Garou: Mark of the Wolves and The King of Fighters '98. Many Neo Geo games were released on the PlayStation 4, Xbox One, Windows, and Nintendo Switch through the Arcade Archives service under the ACA Neo Geo label. In 2019, Antstream Arcade also runs Neo Geo games during the gaming platform's early lifespan.

Homebrew activity began after the console's discontinuation, both by noncommercial hobbyists and commercially.

The Neo Geo has a community of collectors. Because of the limited production runs received by cartridges amongst the available arcade library, some of the rarest Neo Geo games can sell for well over $1,000. The most valuable game is the European AES version of Kizuna Encounter: Super Tag Battle. The MVS market provides an alternative to the rare home cartridges, and complete arcade kits are priced at a premium. It is also possible to play the MVS cartridges, which generally cost much less, on the AES home system through the use of adapters.

In 2009, the Neo Geo was ranked 19th out of the 25 best video game consoles of all time by video game website IGN.

== Recreated hardware ==
Since the 2010s, SNK have revived the Neo Geo in new form factors with built-in games, created both by themselves and by officially licensed third-parties.

=== Neo Geo X ===
The Neo Geo X, an officially licensed device with a collection of Neo Geo games pre-installed, was first released in 2012 by TOMMO Inc. After just one year and a lukewarm reception due to its price and poor quality of the emulation, on October 2, 2013, SNK Playmore terminated the license agreement and demanded an immediate cease and desist of distribution and sales of all licensed products.

=== Neo Geo Mini ===
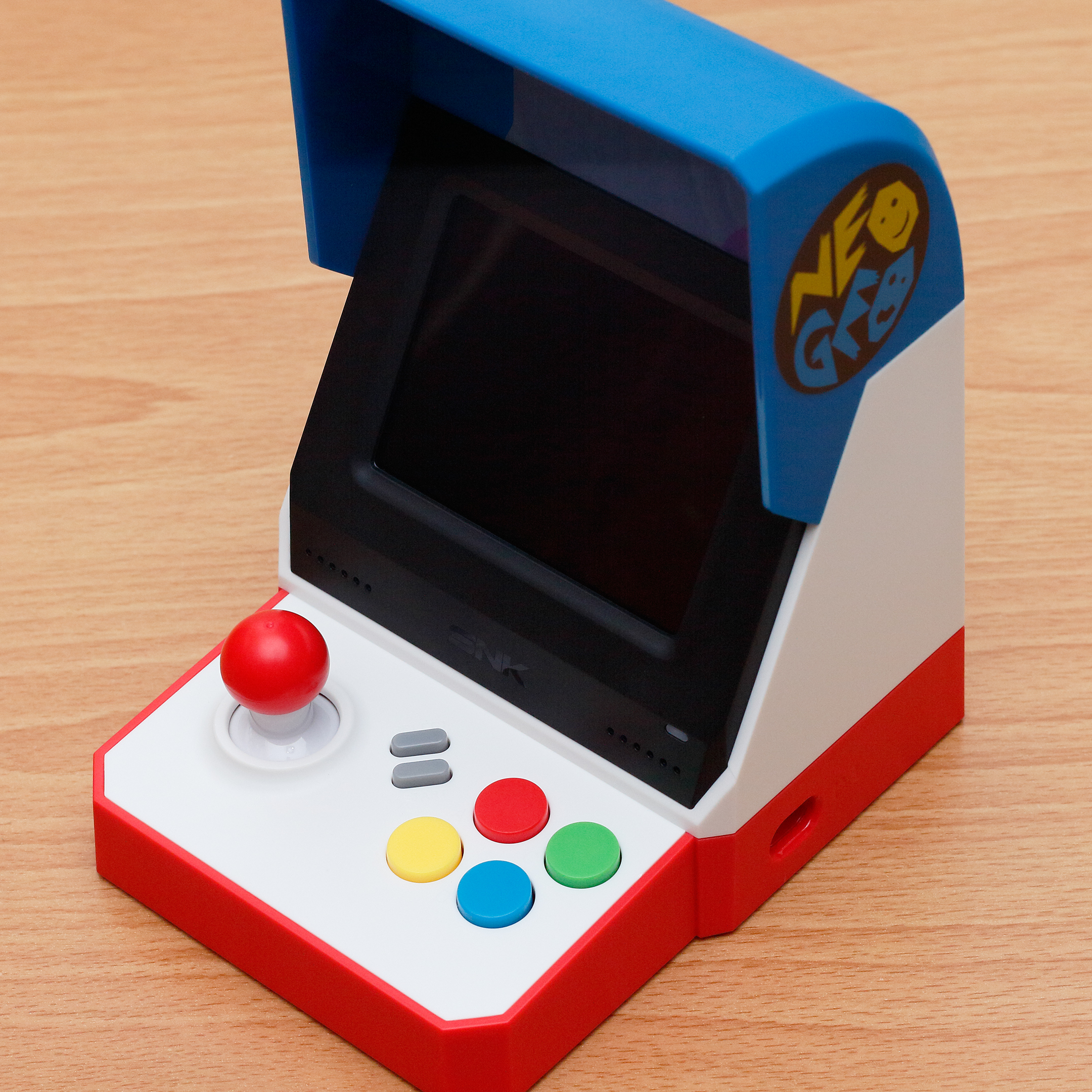
Neo Geo Mini (original Japanese version)

On June 9, 2018, SNK announced the Neo Geo Mini, a miniature sized semi-portable arcade cabinet loosely resembling the appearance of a Japanese Neo Geo MVS, which features 40 built-in SNK titles, and was released on July 24, 2018, in Japan to celebrate SNK's 40th anniversary. The games on the system are the AES home console versions with limited continues; however, the Neo Geo Mini features a save/load state system which allows players to save and load the game at any time to continue the game and has up to four save files per game. In addition to its 320x224 pixel display, it can be connected to a TV via an HDMI cable and it has two ports for external Neo Geo Mini control pads based on the Neo Geo CD controllers.

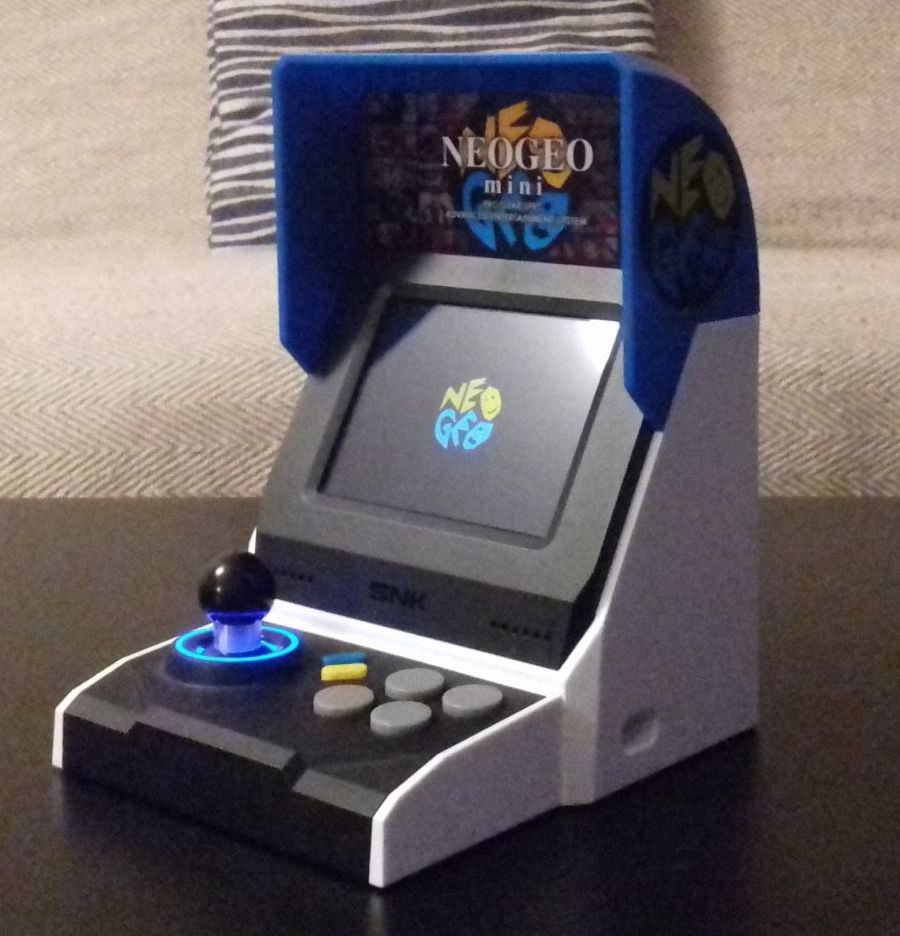
The Neo Geo Mini International Edition

SNK also released an international version of the Neo Geo Mini, which was released outside Japan on October 15, 2018, and later in Japan on November 15, 2018. The international version contains the same features as the Japanese Neo Geo Mini but 14 out of the 40 titles are different (including all of the Metal Slug games) and a different interface. As such, both versions have 54 different SNK titles in total. On July 19, 2019, SNK announced the discontinuation of the original Neo Geo Mini and the international version.

In December 2018, a limited edition Christmas themed Neo Geo Mini was released, featuring nine games previously unreleased on the other two versions. On June 27, 2019, a limited edition called "Samurai Shodown" was released, in three colors; white, red, and blue, with a black edition being released later on. This edition has 40 games, featuring all of the Samurai Shodown games, including three new games that have never been included in prior versions. Another limited edition was released exclusively in Japan on September 30, 2019, called "Samurai Spirits Kuroko", with 48 games.

List of games on Neo Geo Mini
Games	International Edition	Japan Edition	Christmas Edition	Samurai Shodown Editions	Samurai Spirits Kuroko Edition	MVS Edition
3 Count Bout	Yes	No	No	No	No	Yes
Aggressors of Dark Kombat	No	Yes	Yes	Yes	Yes	No
Alpha Mission II	No	Yes	Yes	Yes	Yes	No
Art of Fighting	Yes	Yes	Yes	Yes	Yes	Yes
Art of Fighting 3	No	No	No	No	No	Yes
Baseball Stars Professional	No	No	No	No	No	Yes
Blazing Star	Yes	Yes	Yes	Yes	Yes	No
Blue's Journey	Yes	No	Yes	Yes	Yes	No
Burning Fight	No	Yes	Yes	Yes	Yes	No
Crossed Swords	Yes	No	No	No	No	No
Cyber-Lip	No	Yes	Yes	Yes	Yes	No
Fatal Fury: King of Fighters	No	No	Yes	Yes	Yes	No
Fatal Fury 2	No	No	Yes	Yes	Yes	Yes
Fatal Fury Special	Yes	Yes	No	No	No	Yes
Fatal Fury 3: Road to the Final Victory	No	No	Yes	No	No	Yes
Football Frenzy	Yes	No	No	No	No	Yes
Garou: Mark of the Wolves	Yes	Yes	Yes	Yes	Yes	Yes
Ghost Pilots	Yes	No	No	No	No	No
The King of Fighters '94	No	Yes	No	No	No	Yes
The King of Fighters '95	Yes	Yes	No	No	No	Yes
The King of Fighters '96	No	Yes	No	No	No	Yes
The King of Fighters '97	Yes	Yes	Yes	Yes	Yes	Yes
The King of Fighters '98: The Slugfest	Yes	Yes	Yes	Yes	Yes	Yes
The King of Fighters '99: Millennium Battle	No	Yes	Yes	Yes	Yes	Yes
The King of Fighters 2000	Yes	Yes	No	No	No	Yes
The King of Fighters 2001	No	Yes	Yes	No	Yes	Yes
The King of Fighters 2002: Challenge to Ultimate Battle	Yes	Yes	Yes	No	Yes	Yes
The King of Fighters 2003	No	Yes	No	No	No	Yes
King of the Monsters	Yes	No	Yes	No	Yes	No
King of the Monsters 2	Yes	Yes	Yes	Yes	Yes	No
Kizuna Encounter: Super Tag Battle	Yes	Yes	Yes	Yes	Yes	Yes
The Last Blade	No	Yes	No	No	No	Yes
The Last Blade 2	Yes	Yes	Yes	Yes	Yes	Yes
Last Resort	Yes	No	No	No	No	No
League Bowling	No	No	Yes	Yes	Yes	No
Magician Lord	Yes	No	Yes	Yes	Yes	Yes
Metal Slug	Yes	Yes	Yes	Yes	Yes	Yes
Metal Slug 2	Yes	Yes	Yes	Yes	Yes	No
Metal Slug X	Yes	No	Yes	No	Yes	Yes
Metal Slug 3	Yes	Yes	Yes	Yes	Yes	Yes
Metal Slug 4	Yes	No	Yes	No	Yes	Yes
Metal Slug 5	Yes	No	Yes	No	Yes	Yes
Mutation Nation	Yes	No	No	No	Yes	No
Ninja Combat	No	No	Yes	No	No	No
Ninja Commando	No	Yes	Yes	Yes	Yes	No
Ninja Master's: Haō Ninpō Chō	Yes	Yes	Yes	Yes	Yes	No
Puzzled	Yes	Yes	No	No	No	No
Real Bout Fatal Fury	Yes	Yes	No	No	No	Yes
Real Bout Fatal Fury Special	No	No	Yes	Yes	Yes	Yes
Real Bout Fatal Fury 2: The Newcomers	No	Yes	Yes	Yes	Yes	Yes
Robo Army	Yes	No	Yes	Yes	Yes	No
Samurai Shodown	No	No	No	Yes	Yes	Yes
Samurai Shodown II	Yes	Yes	Yes	Yes	Yes	Yes
Samurai Shodown III: Blades of Blood	No	No	No	Yes	Yes	Yes
Samurai Shodown IV: Amakusa's Revenge	Yes	Yes	Yes	Yes	Yes	Yes
Samurai Shodown V	No	No	No	Yes	Yes	Yes
Samurai Shodown V Special	Yes	Yes	Yes	Yes	Yes	Yes
Savage Reign	No	No	Yes	No	No	Yes
Sengoku	No	No	No	No	No	Yes
Sengoku 2	No	No	No	No	No	Yes
Sengoku 3	Yes	Yes	Yes	Yes	Yes	Yes
Shock Troopers	Yes	No	Yes	No	Yes	Yes
Shock Troopers: 2nd Squad	Yes	Yes	Yes	Yes	Yes	No
Soccer Brawl	No	No	Yes	Yes	Yes	No
Super Sidekicks	Yes	Yes	Yes	Yes	Yes	Yes
The Super Spy	No	No	Yes	No	No	No
Top Hunter: Roddy & Cathy	No	Yes	Yes	Yes	Yes	No
Top Player's Golf	Yes	Yes	Yes	Yes	Yes	Yes
Twinkle Star Sprites	No	Yes	Yes	Yes	Yes	No
World Heroes Perfect	Yes	Yes	Yes	Yes	Yes	Yes
Number of games Included	40	40	48	40	48	45
Games	International Edition	Japan Edition	Christmas Edition	Samurai Shodown Editions	Samurai Spirits Kuroko Edition	MVS Edition

=== Neo Geo Arcade Stick Pro ===
In September 2019, SNK announced the release of the Neo Geo Arcade Stick Pro. Resembling a large white arcade stick complete with joystick and 8 buttons, it has 20 built-in games as well as HDMI output for TVs. It can also be used on any of the Neo Geo Mini units via an included adapter and is also backwards compatible with the game pads released for the Mini. The initial 20 built-in games were all fighting games, but more games were added by SNK through software updates to make a total of 40.

In November 2020, a special limited Christmas edition of the Neo Geo Arcade Stick Pro was released. The package includes a Neo Geo CD style control pad, a cover for the arcade stick, an arcade stick ball cover, a sticker sheet and a Neo Geo 30th anniversary artbook. All 40 games are included, unlocked from the start.

List of Neo Geo Arcade Stick Pro games
Initial games	Additional games released throughout 2020
Art of Fighting; Fatal Fury 3: Road to the Final Victory; Fatal Fury Special; Garou: Mark of the Wolves; The King of Fighters '95; The King of Fighters '97; The King of Fighters '98: The Slugfest; The King of Fighters '99: Millennium Battle; The King of Fighters 2000; The King of Fighters 2002: Challenge to Ultimate Battle; Kizuna Encounter: Super Tag Battle; The Last Blade 2; Ninja Master's: Haō Ninpō Chō; Samurai Shodown II; Samurai Shodown III: Blades of Blood; Samurai Shodown IV: Amakusa's Revenge; Samurai Shodown V Special; World Heroes 2; World Heroes 2 Jet; World Heroes Perfect	Art of Fighting 3: The Path of the Warrior; Fatal Fury 2; Fatal Fury: King of Fighters; The Last Blade; League Bowling; Metal Slug; Metal Slug 2; Metal Slug 3; Metal Slug 4; Metal Slug 5; Metal Slug X; Ninja Combat; Real Bout Fatal Fury Special; Samurai Shodown; Savage Reign; Shock Troopers; Shock Troopers: 2nd Squad; Soccer Brawl; Super Sidekicks; The Super Spy

=== Unico ===
In August 2020, the company Unico announced the Neo Geo MVSX, an arcade table top system capable of playing MVS and AES titles that are pre-installed on the system itself, with 2-player support with a 17-inch screen, and pre-loaded with 50 games. Also available is a 32-inch stand to allow it to work as a free-standing unit resembling a vintage MVS cabinet. It was released in November 2020 in North America.

In late 2023, Unico released another Neo Geo Mini, this one in the style of an MVS arcade cabinet. It could be purchased with or without an additional Unico red controller, modelled the same way as the pre-existing Neo Geo Mini controllers and an HDMI cable. It comes pre-loaded with 45 games, most of them are the same as those found on the MVSX, but with five games removed from the line up.

=== Neo Geo AES+ ===
In April 2026, SNK and Plaion announced the Neo Geo AES+, a recreation of the original AES hardware using ASIC chips. The system will feature options including overclocking functions, language selection, and display options. It also features HDMI video output, alongside the original console's analog outputs of composite video and RGB. Along with the system, replicas of the original arcade stick, gamepad, and memory card accessories will also be released. Original Neo Geo games will also be re-released in cartridge format, and will be fully compatible with original AES consoles. Ten games will be re-printed for the launch of the AES+: Metal Slug, The King of Fighters 2002, Garou: Mark of the Wolves, Neo Turf Masters, Shock Troopers, Samurai Shodown V Special, Pulstar, Twinkle Star Sprites, Magician Lord, and Over Top. There will also be a white Neo Geo AES+ released to celebrate the console's 35th anniversary, which includes a white arcade stick and a white cartridge version of Metal Slug.

Originally scheduled for release on November 12, 2026, in September 2026 the Neo Geo AES+ was delayed to September 16, 2027, with Plaion citing the global memory shortage as the primary reason for the delay.

== See also ==
- Atomiswave
- List of Neo Geo games
- Neo Geo CD
- Neo Geo Pocket
