= Neo Geo CD =

Home video game console

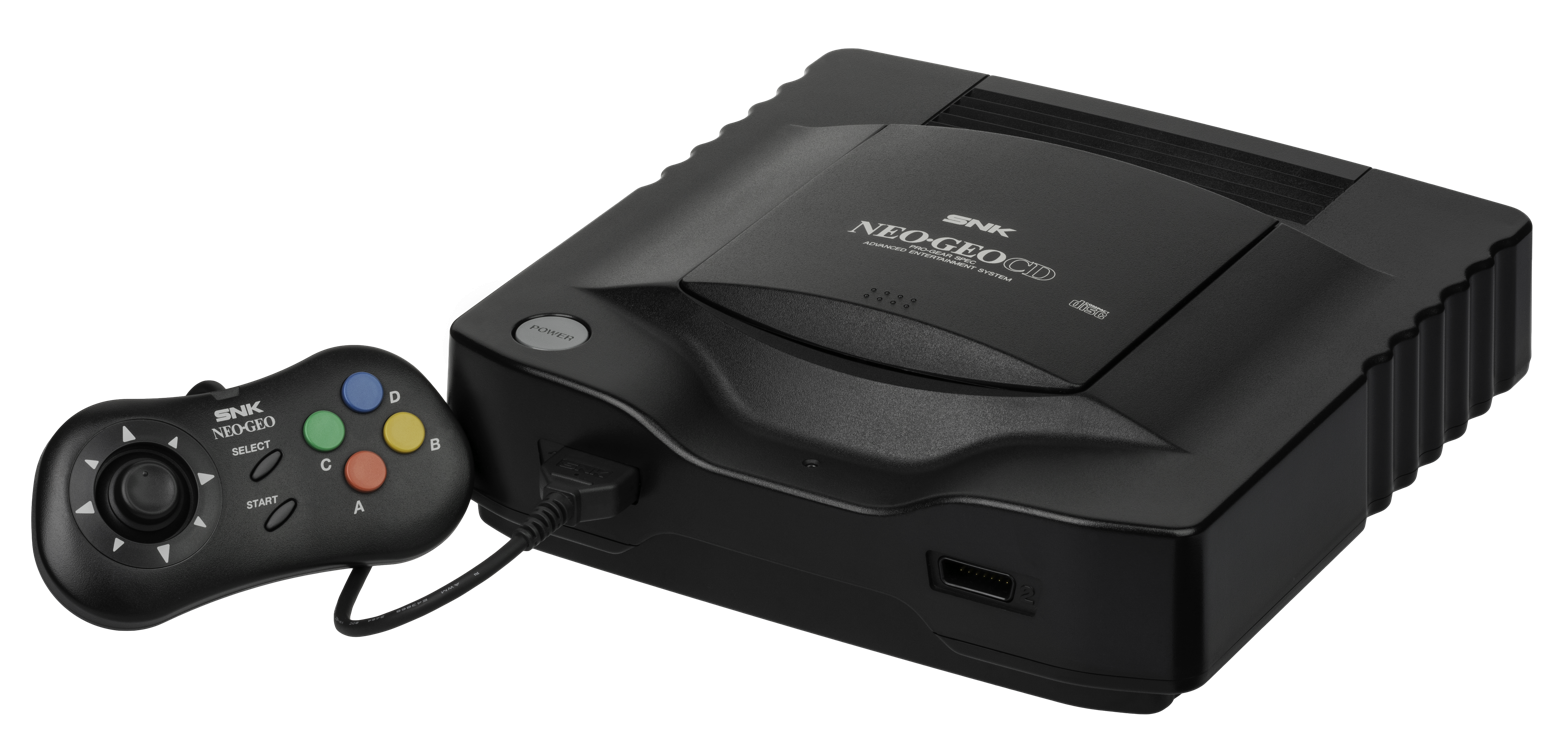
- The top loading Neo Geo CD system with controller
- Manufacturer: SNK
- Type: Home video game console
- Generation: Fourth
- Released: JP: September 9, 1994; EU: December 3, 1994; AU: December 23, 1994; NA: January 15, 1996
- Introductory price: NA: US$399; JP: ¥49,800
- Discontinued: 1997
- Units sold: 570,000
- Media: CD-ROM
- CPU: Motorola 68000 @ 12 MHz
- Predecessor: Neo Geo AES
- Website: neogeo.co.jp at the Wayback Machine (archived 1997-10-11)

The Neo Geo CD (ネオジオCD, Neo Jio Shī Dī) also called as NeoCD is a home video game console produced by SNK Corporation, released on September 9, 1994. The system is the same platform as the cartridge-based Neo Geo released four years earlier, but converted to the cheaper CD media format which retailed at $49 to 79 per title compared to up to $300 for the equivalent cartridge.

The Neo Geo CD was launched with a bundled control pad instead of a joystick like the AES version of the Neo Geo came with; however, the system was compatible with controllers from the AES. The Neo Geo CD met with limited success due to it being plagued with long loading times that could vary from 30 to 60 seconds, depending on the game, and its lack of 3D graphics capabilities at a time when 3D graphics were becoming ubiquitous in the video game industry. As of September 30, 1997, there had been 570,000 Neo Geo CD units sold worldwide; production of all Neo Geo consoles were discontinued in 1997, while new software continued to be released and backported by the Neo Geo MVS until 2004.

== History ==
The Neo Geo CD was first unveiled at the 1994 Tokyo Toy Show. The console uses the same CPU set-up as the arcade and cartridge-based Neo Geo systems, facilitating conversions. SNK planned to release Neo Geo CD versions of every Neo Geo game still in the arcades.

The system was originally priced at US$399.

In response to criticism of the Neo Geo CD's long load times, SNK planned to produce a model with a double-speed CD-ROM drive for North America, compared to the single-speed drive of the Japanese and European models. However, the system missed its planned North American launch date of October 1995, and while SNK declined to give a specific reason for the delay, in their announcement of the new January 1996 launch date they stated that they had decided against using a double-speed drive. Their Japanese division had produced an excess number of single-speed units and found that modifying these units to double-speed was more expensive than they had initially thought, so SNK opted to sell them as they were, postponing production of a double-speed model until they had sold off the stock of single-speed units.

In response to reader inquiries about Neo Geo CD software, GamePro reported in an issue cover dated May 1997 that SNK had quietly discontinued the console by this time.

== Reception ==
Criticism of the system's generally long loading times began even before launch; a report in Electronic Gaming Monthly on the Neo Geo CD's unveiling noted, "At the show, they were showing a demo of Fatal Fury 2. The prototype of the machine that they showed was single speed, and the load time was 14-28 seconds between rounds. You can see that the screen[shot] on the right is a load screen."

Approximately one month after launch, SNK reported that they had sold the Neo Geo CD's entire initial shipment of 50,000 units.

Reviewing the Neo Geo CD in late 1995, Next Generation noted SNK's reputation for fun games but argued that their failure to upgrade the Neo Geo system with 3D capabilities would keep them from producing any truly "cutting edge" games, and limit the console to the same small cult following as the Neo Geo AES system in spite of the games being less expensive. They gave it 1 1/2 out of 5 stars.

== Hardware ==
=== Technical specifications ===
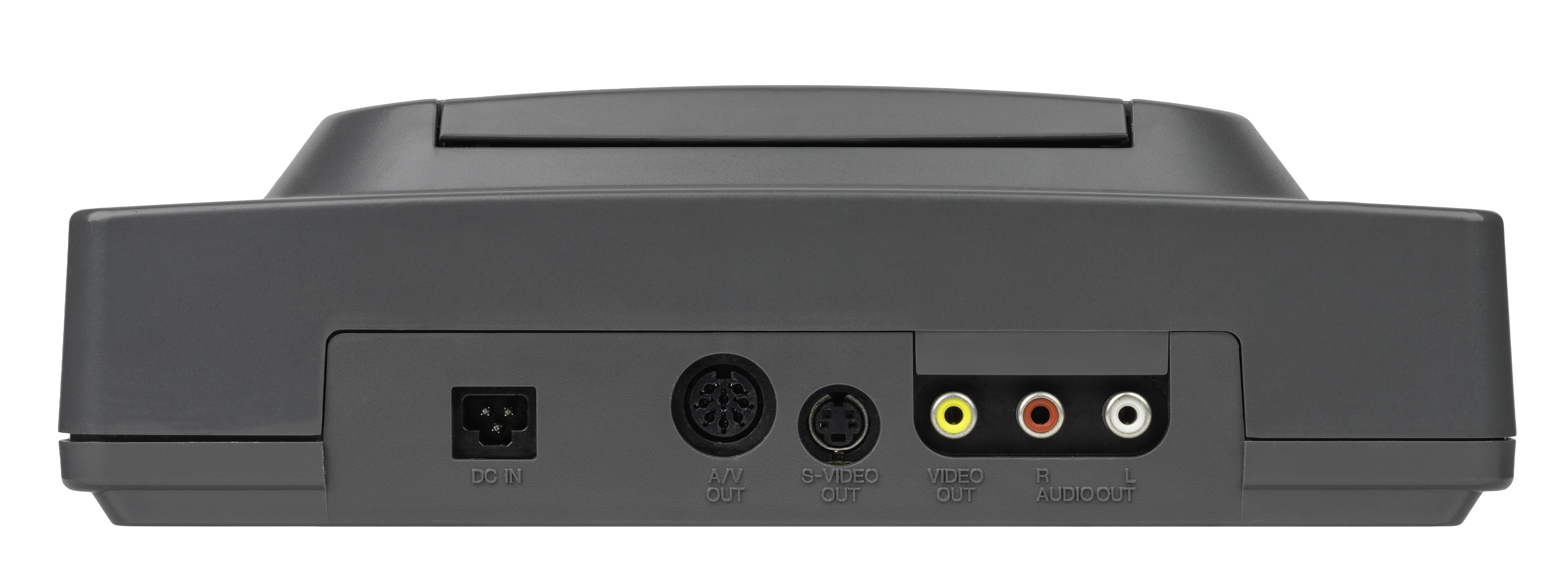
The standard A/V outs on the Neo Geo CD, as well as a multi port for RGB video

- Main Processor: Motorola 68000 running at 12 MHz. Although the original CPU was designed by Motorola, many of the 68000 CPUs in Neo Geo hardware are manufactured by second-sources. The most common CPU is the TMP68HC000 manufactured by Toshiba.
- Coprocessor: Zilog Z80 running at 4 MHz
- Colors on screen: 4,096
- Colors available: 65,536
- Resolution: 304 x 224
- Max sprites: 384
- Max sprite size: 16 x 512
- Number of planes: 3 (128 sprites per plane as the Neo Geo does not use tiles for its planes like with most game systems at the time)

The system is also capable of reading Redbook standard compact disc audio.

In addition to the multi-AV port (nearly identical to the one used on the Sega Genesis model 1, though they are not interchangeable), all Neo Geo CD models had composite RCA A/V and S-Video out jacks on the rear of the console.

The CD system's 56 Mbit / 7 MB of RAM was split accordingly:

- 68000 program memory: 2 MB
- Fix layer memory: 128 KB
- Graphics memory: 4 MB
- Sound sample memory: 1 MB
- Z80 program memory: 64 kB
- VRAM: 512Kb (For graphics attributes)
- SRAM: 2 KB (For high scores / general save data)

=== Models ===
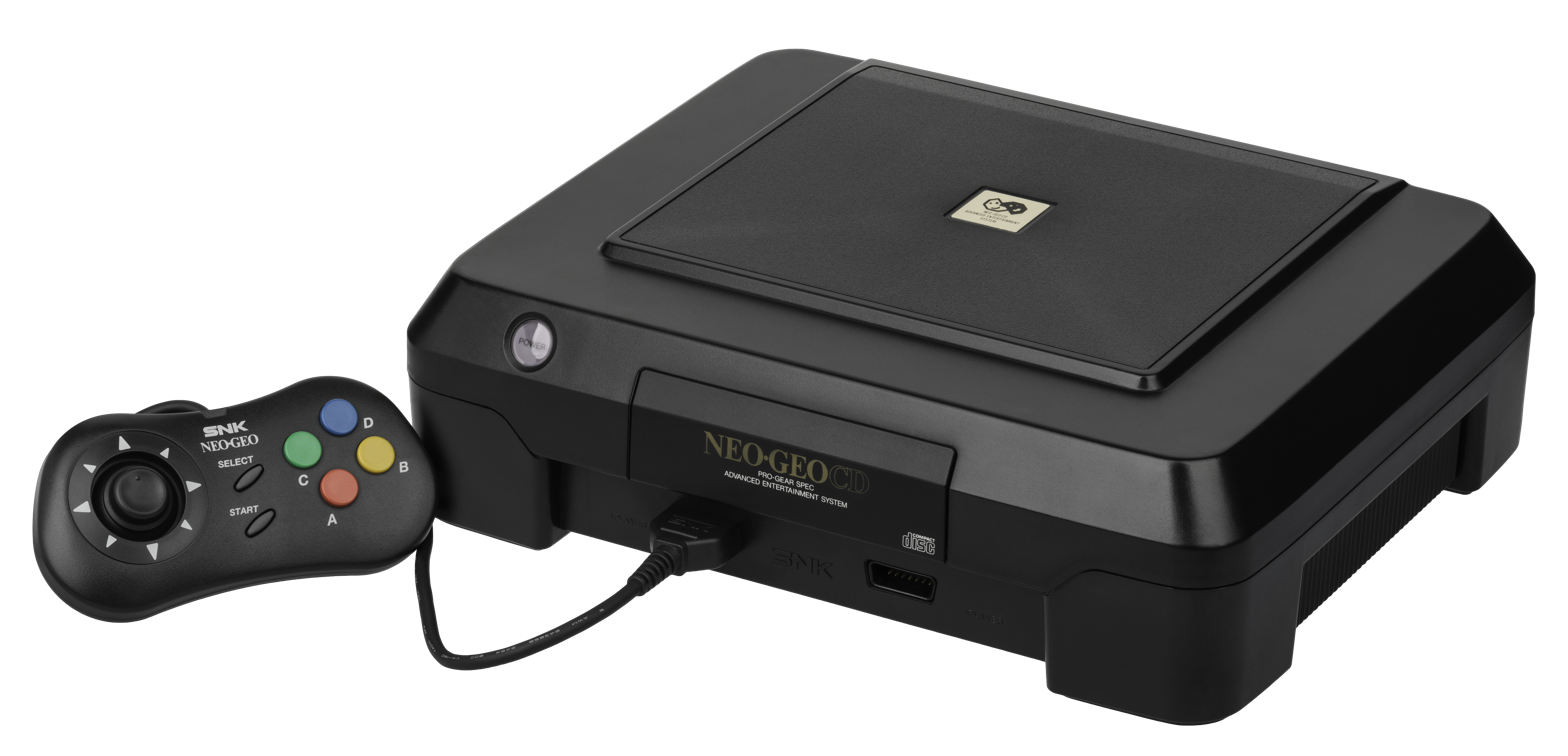
The front-loading version was the first to be marketed, and was only released in Japan.

Three versions of the Neo Geo CD were released:

1. A front-loading version, only distributed in Japan, with 25,000 total units built
2. A top-loading version, marketed worldwide, as the most common model
3. The Neo Geo CDZ, an upgraded, faster-loading version, released in Japan only

The front loader is the original console design, while the top loader version was developed shortly before the Neo Geo CD launch as a smaller, cheaper alternative model.

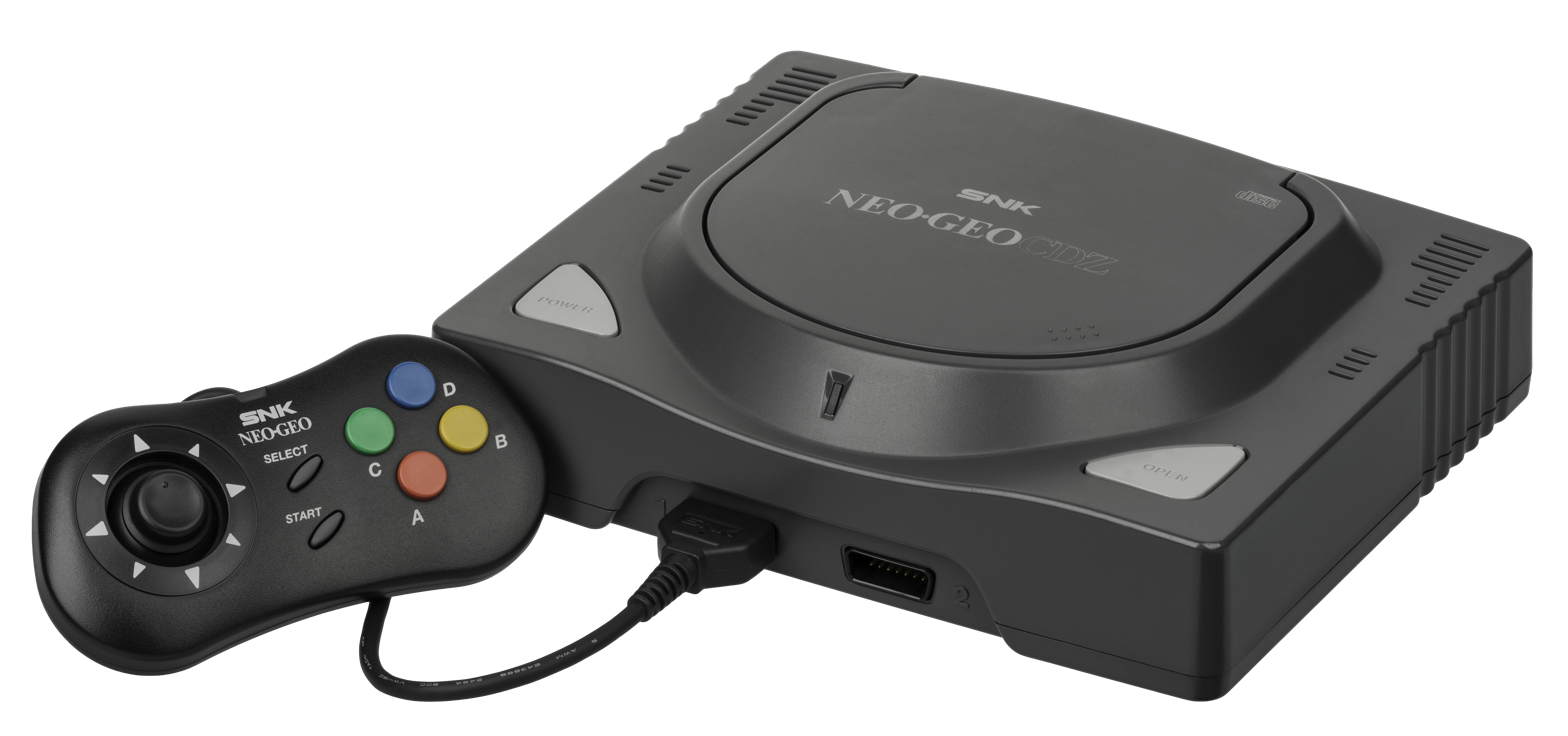
The CDZ was only released in Japan and featured faster CD loading than the previous models.

The CDZ was released on December 29, 1995, as the Japanese market replacement for the top loader unit. The system's technical specs are identical to the previous models except that it includes a double-speed CD-ROM drive, and different CD controller circuitry.

All three versions of the system have no region lock, but they are region aware, and some games will display English or Japanese depending on the console's region setting. The system can also play Audio CDs.

== Software ==
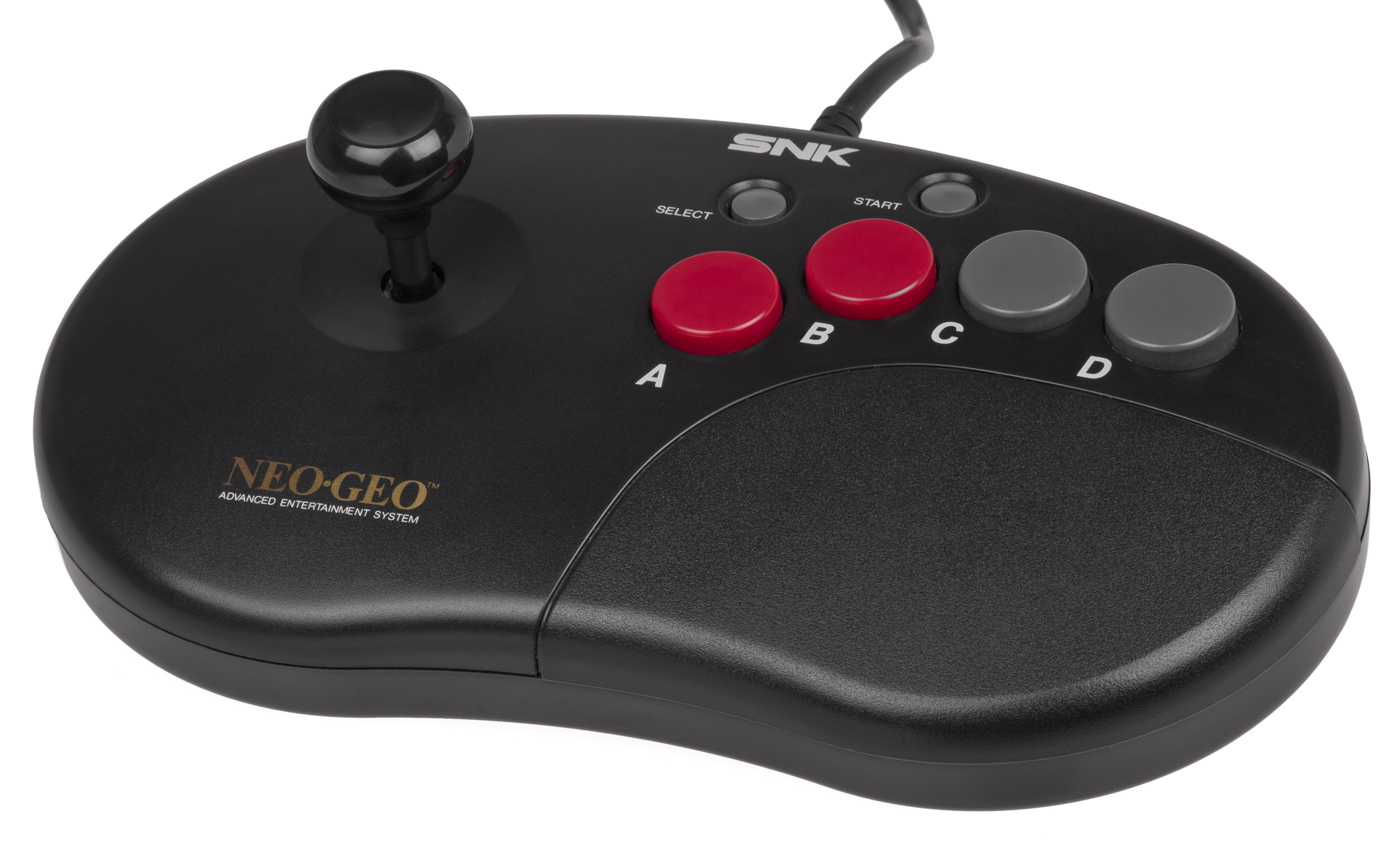
The Neo Geo Controller Pro, an update to the previous Neo Geo AES's arcade stick controller

A total of 97 games were released for the Neo Geo CD. While the Neo Geo CD library consists primarily of ports of MVS and AES titles, there are a few MVS arcade games which were not officially released for the Neo Geo AES and instead ported to the Neo Geo CD. These include Puzzle Bobble, Janshin Densetsu: Quest of Jongmaster (a Mahjong game also released for the PC Engine), Power Spikes II, Neo Drift Out: New Technology, and Pleasure Goal: 5 on 5 Mini Soccer (Futsal: 5-on-5 Mini Soccer).

In addition, only eight games, which were unreleased in MVS and AES formats, were released exclusively for the Neo Geo CD. These include Ironclad: Tesshō Rusha (Chōtetsu Burikingā, BRIKIN'GER), Crossed Swords II, ZinTrick (Oshidashi Zintorikku), ADK World, Neo Geo CD Special, The King of Fighters '96 Neo Collection, Samurai Shodown RPG (Shinsetsu Samurai Spirits: Bushidō Retsuden; an RPG spin-off of the Samurai Shodown series that was also released for the Sony PlayStation and Sega Saturn), and Idol-Mahjong Final Romance 2 (an arcade game which is not an MVS game, but was ported directly to the Neo Geo CD).

Two prototype games were in development: Bang² Busters [Bang Bang Busters] (Made by Visco in 2000. Released in 2010 for Neo Geo CD by N.C.I.) and Treasure of the Caribbean [Caribe no Zaihō] (Made by Face in 1994. Released in 2011 for Neo Geo CD by N.C.I./Le Cortex).
