= List of SNK games =

SNK logo

Japanese video game company SNK (formerly Shin Nihon Kikaku and SNK Playmore) began developing and publishing video games in 1978. SNK's first video games were released on dedicated arcade boards throughout the 1980s. In the 1990s and early 2000s, most of their games were released on their proprietary hardware, including the Neo Geo and Neo Geo Pocket Color. The following is the list of games developed and/or published by SNK itself as well as ports from other companies authorized by SNK.

== Arcade platforms ==
=== Dedicated boards ===
Title	Developer	Release date	System(s)
Alpha Mission	SNK	1985	Arcade, NES
Athena	SNK	July 1986	Arcade, Amstrad CPC, Commodore 64, NES, ZX Spectrum
Atom Smasher	SNK	1980	Arcade
Beast Busters	SNK	November 1989	Arcade, Amiga, Atari ST
Bermuda Triangle	SNK	February 1987	Arcade
Canvas Croquis	SNK	1985	Arcade
Chopper I	SNK	June 1988	Arcade
Country Club	SNK	1988	Arcade
Fantasy	SNK	October 1981	Arcade
Fighting Soccer	SNK	May 1988	Arcade
Gang Wars	Alpha Denshi	July 1989	Arcade
Gladiator 1984	SNK	1984	Arcade
Gold Medalist	SNK	1988	Arcade
Guerrilla War	SNK	March 1987	Arcade, Amstrad CPC, Apple II, Commodore 64, NES, ZX Spectrum
HAL 21	SNK	March 1985	Arcade
Ikari III: The Rescue	SNK	January 1989	Arcade, Commodore 64, MS-DOS, NES
Ikari Warriors	SNK	February 1986	Arcade, Apple II, Amiga, Atari 2600, Atari 7800, Atari ST, Acorn Electron, Amstrad CPC, BBC Micro, Commodore 64, MS-DOS, NES, MSX2, ZX Spectrum
Jongbou	SNK	1987	Arcade
Jongbou II	SNK	1987	Arcade
Jumping Cross	SNK	1984	Arcade
Lasso	SNK	August 1982	Arcade
Lee Trevino's Fighting Golf	SNK	May 1988	Arcade, NES
Mad Crasher	SNK	December 1984	Arcade
Mahjong Classroom	SNK	1983	Arcade
Main Event	SNK	November 1984	Arcade
Marvin's Maze	SNK	December 1983	Arcade
Mechanized Attack	SNK	March 1989	Arcade, NES
Mejinsen	SNK	1986	Arcade
Micon Kit	SNK	1978	Arcade
The Monkey and Monkey Fiend	SNK	1980	Arcade
Munch Mobile	SNK	January 1983	Arcade
The Next Space	SNK	October 1989	Arcade
Ozma Wars	SNK	December 1979	Arcade
P.O.W.: Prisoners of War	SNK	August 1988	Arcade, NES
Paddle Mania	SNK	January 1988	Arcade
Pioneer Balloon	SNK	March 1982	Arcade
Prehistoric Isle in 1930	SNK	June 1989	Arcade
Psycho Soldier	SNK	March 1987	Arcade, Amstrad CPC, Commodore 64, ZX Spectrum
Safari Rally	SNK	December 1979	Arcade
SAR: Search and Rescue	SNK	December 1989	Arcade
Sasuke vs. Commander	Tose	October 1980	Arcade
Shusse Ōzumō	Technōs Japan	June 1984	Arcade
Sky Adventure	Alpha Denshi	November 1989	Arcade
Sky Soldiers	Alpha Denshi	July 1988	Arcade
Street Smart	SNK	August 1989	Arcade, Genesis
Super Champion Baseball	SNK	1989	Arcade
Super Tank	Video Games	October 1981	Arcade
Time Soldiers	Alpha Denshi	September 1987	Arcade, Amiga, Atari ST, Commodore 64, Master System
TNK III	SNK	September 1985	Arcade, Amstrad CPC, Commodore 64, ZX Spectrum
Touchdown Fever	SNK	January 1987	Arcade, NES
Touchdown Fever 2	SNK	1988	Arcade
Vanguard	Tose	July 1981	Arcade
Vanguard II	SNK	March 1984	Arcade
Victory Road	SNK	October 1986	Arcade, Amiga, Amstrad CPC, Apple II, Commodore 64, MS-DOS, NES, ZX Spectrum
World Wars	SNK	May 1987	Arcade
Yosaku	SNK	1979	Arcade
Zarzon	SNK	March 1981	Arcade

=== Neo Geo, Neo Geo CD & Hyper Neo Geo 64 ===
- 1990
  - Baseball Stars Professional
  - Blue's Journey (Raguy)
  - Cyber-Lip
  - League Bowling
  - Magician Lord
  - MahJong Kyoretsuden: Higashi Nippon Hen
  - Mahjong Kyōretsuden: Nishi Nihon Hen
  - NAM-1975
  - Puzzled (Joy Joy Kid)
  - Riding Hero
  - The Super Spy
  - Top Player's Golf
- 1991
  - Alpha Mission II (ASO II: Last Guardian)
  - Bakatono-sama Mahjong Manyūki
  - Burning Fight
  - Crossed Swords
  - Eight Man
  - Fatal Fury: King of Fighters (Garou Densetsu: Shukumei no Tatakai)
  - Ghost Pilots
  - Great Quiz Detective
  - King of the Monsters
  - Legend of Success Joe
  - Minna-san no Okage-sama Desu! Dai Sugoroku Taikai
  - Quiz Daisousa Sen: The Last Count Down
  - Robo Army
  - Sengoku (Sengoku Denshou)
  - Soccer Brawl
  - Super Baseball 2020
  - Thrash Rally
- 1992
  - Andro Dunos
  - Art of Fighting (Ryuuko no Ken)
  - Baseball Stars 2
  - Fatal Fury 2 (Garou Densetsu 2: Arata-naru Tatakai)
  - Football Frenzy
  - King of the Monsters 2: The Next Thing
  - Last Resort
  - Mutation Nation
  - Ninja Commando
  - Quiz Meitantei Neo Geo (Quiz Daisousa Sen Part 2)
  - Super Sidekicks (Tokuten Ou)
  - Viewpoint
  - World Heroes
- 1993
  - 3 Count Bout (Fire Suplex)
  - Fatal Fury Special (Garou Densetsu Special)
  - Samurai Shodown (Samurai Spirits)
  - Sengoku 2 (Sengoku Denshou 2)
  - Spinmaster (Miracle Adventure)
  - World Heroes 2
- 1994
  - Aero Fighters 2 (Sonic Wings 2)
  - Aggressors of Dark Kombat (Tsuukai Gangan Koushinkyoku)
  - Art of Fighting 2 (Ryuuko no Ken 2)
  - Fight Fever
  - Gururin
  - Janshin Densetsu: Quest of Jongmaster
  - Karnov's Revenge (Fighter's History Dynamite)
  - The King of Fighters '94
  - Power Spikes II
  - Puzzle Bobble (Bust-A-Move)
  - Samurai Shodown II (Shin Samurai Spirits: Haohmaru jigokuhen)
  - Super Sidekicks 2: The World Championship (Tokuten Ou 2: Real Fight Football)
  - Street Slam (Street Hoop, Dunk Dream)
  - Top Hunter: Roddy & Cathy
  - World Heroes 2 Jet
  - Windjammers
  - Zed Blade
- 1995
  - Aero Fighters 3 (Sonic Wings 3)
  - Bomberman: Panic Bomber
  - Chibi Maruko-chan: Maruko Deluxe Quiz
  - Crossed Swords II
  - Double Dragon
  - Far East of Eden: Kabuki Klash (Tengai Makyou: Shin Den)
  - Fatal Fury 3: Road to the Final Victory (Garou Densetsu 3: Haruka-naru Tatakai)
  - Galaxy Fight: Universal Warriors
  - Goal! Goal! Goal!
  - Idol Mahjong Final Romance 2
  - The King of Fighters '95
  - Master of Syougi
  - Pulstar
  - Puzzle de Pon!
  - Quiz King of Fighters
  - Real Bout Fatal Fury (Real Bout Garou Densetsu)
  - Samurai Shodown III: Blades of Blood (Samurai Spirits: Zankurou Musouken)
  - Savage Reign (Fu'un Mokushiroku: Kakutou Sousei)
  - Stakes Winner (Stakes Winner: GI Kinzen Seihae no Michi)
  - Super Sidekicks 3: The Next Glory (Tokuten Ou 3: Eikoue No Michi)
  - Taisen Idol-Mahjong Final Romance 2
  - Voltage Fighter Gowcaizer (Choujin Gakuen Gowcaizer)
  - World Heroes Perfect
- 1996
  - Art of Fighting 3: The Path of the Warrior (Art of Fighting: Ryuuko no Ken Gaiden)
  - Breakers
  - Ironclad
  - The King of Fighters '96
  - Kizuna Encounter: Super Tag Battle (Fu'un Super Tag Battle)
  - Magical Drop II
  - Metal Slug (Metal Slug: Super Vehicle-001)
  - Neo Drift Out: New Technology
  - Neo Mr. Do!
  - Neo Turf Masters (Big Tournament Golf)
  - Ninja Master's -Haoh-Ninpo-Cho-
  - Over Top
  - Pleasure Goal: 5 on 5 Mini Soccer (Futsal: 5 on 5 Mini Soccer)
  - Ragnagard (Shin-Oh-Ken)
  - Samurai Shodown IV: Amakusa's Revenge (Samurai Spirits: Amakusa Kourin)
  - Tecmo World Soccer '96
  - Twinkle Star Sprites
  - Super Dodge Ball (Kunio no Nekketsu Toukyuu Densetsu)
  - The Ultimate 11: SNK Football Championship (Tokuten Ou: Honoo no Libero)
  - Waku Waku 7
  - ZinTrick
- 1997
  - Real Bout Fatal Fury Special (Real Bout Garou Densetsu Special)
  - The Irritating Maze
  - The King of Fighters '97
  - The Last Blade (Bakumatsu Roman: Gekka no Kenshi)
  - Money Puzzle Exchanger (Money Idol Exchanger)
  - Neo Bomberman
  - Pop'n Bounce
  - Puzzle De Pon! R!
  - Road's Edge (Round Trip)
  - Samurai Shodown 64
  - Samurai Shodown RPG (Shinsetsu Samurai Spirits Bushidō Retsuden)
  - Shock Troopers
- 1998
  - Battle Flip Shot
  - Blazing Star
  - Breakers Revenge
  - Fatal Fury: Wild Ambition
  - The King of Fighters '98: The Slugfest (The King of Fighters '98: Dream Match Never Ends)
  - The Last Blade 2 (Bakumatsu Roman: Dai Ni Maku Gekka no Kenshi)
  - Metal Slug 2 (Metal Slug 2: Super Vehicle-001/II)
  - Neo Geo Cup '98: The Road to the Victory
  - Real Bout Fatal Fury 2: The Newcomers (Real Bout Garou Densetsu 2: The Newcomers)
  - Samurai Shodown 64: Warriors Rage (Samurai Spirits 2: Asura Zanmaden)
  - Shock Troopers: 2nd Squad
  - Off Beat Racer!/Xtreme Rally
- 1999
  - Beast Busters: Second Nightmare
  - Buriki One
  - Captain Tomaday
  - Garou: Mark of the Wolves
  - Ganryu
  - The King of Fighters '99: Millennium Battle
  - Metal Slug X (Metal Slug X: Super Vehicle-001)
  - Prehistoric Isle 2 (Genshi Tou)
  - Puzzle Bobble 2
  - Strikers 1945 Plus
- 2000
  - Bang Bead
  - The King of Fighters 2000
  - Metal Slug 3
  - Nightmare in the Dark
- 2001
  - The King of Fighters 2001
  - Sengoku 3 (Sengoku Legends 2001)
  - ZuPaPa!
- 2002
  - The King of Fighters 2002: Challenge to Ultimate Battle
  - Metal Slug 4
  - Rage of the Dragons
- 2003
  - The King of Fighters 2003
  - Metal Slug 5
  - Pochi and Nyaa
  - Power Instinct Matrimelee (Shin Gouketsuji Ichizoku Toukon)
  - Samurai Shodown V (Samurai Spirits Zero)
  - SNK vs. Capcom: SVC Chaos
- 2004
  - Samurai Shodown V Special (Samurai Spirits Zero Special)

=== Atomiswave ===
- 2004
  - The King of Fighters Neowave (released by Sammy)
- 2005
  - Neo Geo Battle Coliseum (released by Sega)
  - Samurai Shodown VI (Samurai Spirits: Tenkaichi Kenkakuden) (released by Sega)
  - The King of Fighters XI (released by Sega)
- 2006
  - Metal Slug 6 (released by Sega)

=== Taito Type X^{2} ===
- 2007
  - KOF: Maximum Impact Regulation A (released by Taito)
- 2008
  - Samurai Shodown Sen (Samurai Spirits Sen) (released by Taito)
- 2009
  - The King of Fighters 2002: Unlimited Match (released by Taito, also available for the SI Electronics System Board Y2)
  - The King of Fighters XII (released by AMI)
- 2010
  - The King of Fighters XIII

=== Taito Type X ===
- 2008
  - The King of Fighters '98: Ultimate Match (released by Taito, also available for the IGS PGM2 (PolyGame Master 2))
- 2010
  - KOF Sky Stage (released by Taito)

=== Taito Type X^{3} ===
- 2017
  - The King of Fighters XIV (released by Taito)
- 2018
  - SNK Heroines: Tag Team Frenzy (released by Taito)
- 2019
  - Samurai Shodown (2019) (released by Taito)

=== Taito Type X^{4} ===
- 2028
  - Metal Slug 8 3D (released by Taito)

== Neo Geo Pocket & Neo Geo Pocket Color ==
- 1999
  - Baseball Stars Color
  - Biomotor Unitron
  - Crush Roller
  - Dark Arms: Beast Busters
  - Fatal Fury: First Contact
  - The King of Fighters R-1
  - The King of Fighters R-2
  - Magical Drop Pocket
  - Metal Slug: 1st Mission
  - Neo Geo Cup '98 Plus Color
  - Neo Turf Masters
  - Pocket Tennis Color
  - Puyo Pop
  - Puzzle Bobble Mini
  - Samurai Shodown! 2 (Samurai Spirits! 2)
  - SNK vs. Capcom: Card Fighters' Clash
  - SNK vs. Capcom: The Match of the Millennium
  - Sonic the Hedgehog Pocket Adventure
- 2000
  - Cotton
  - The King of Fighters: Battle de Paradise
  - The Last Blade: Beyond the Destiny
  - Metal Slug: 2nd Mission
  - Shanghai Mini
  - SNK Gals' Fighters
  - Ballistic
  - Battle Royal
  - Big Bang Pro-Wrestling
  - Bikkuriman 2000
  - Billiard Break Shot
  - Biomotor Unitron 2
  - Bust-A-Move Pocket
  - Cool Boarders Pocket
  - Cool Cool Jam
  - Del Sol 2
  - Delta Warp
  - Densha de Go! 2 Kōsoku-hen
  - Digital Primate
  - Dive Alert
  - Dynamite Slugger
  - Evolution: Eternal Dungeons
  - Faselei!
  - Ganbare Neo Poke-Kun
  - Graduation Photograph
  - Ikari Warriors
  - Koi Koi Mahjong
  - Master of Syougi
  - Melon Chan's Growth Diary
  - Melon Chan's Growth Diary 2
  - Neo 21
  - Neo Baccarat
  - Neo Cherry Master Color
  - Neo Dragon's Wild
  - Neo Mystery Bonus
  - Neo Pocket Bass Fishing
  - NeoGeo Cup '98
  - Oekaki Puzzle
  - Ogre Battle Gaiden: Prince of Zenobia
  - Pachinko Simulation Vol. 1
  - Party Mail
  - Pocket Fishing
  - Pocket Love - If
  - Pocket Reversi
  - Popeye and Betty
  - Puzzle Link
  - Puzzle Link 2
  - Puzzle Tsunagete Pon
  - SNK vs. Capcom: Card Fighters 2 Expand Edition
  - Samurai Shodown! (Samurai Spirits!)
  - Shigeru Mizuki's Ghost Photo Gallery
  - Soccer Manager Simulation
  - Super Producer
  - Super Real Mahjong: Premium Collection
  - Thunder V
  - Tsunagete Pon! 2
  - Ward of Lights
  - World Heroes Pocket
  - Zero Kichi

== Other consoles (1986–96) ==
=== Famicom / NES ===
- Alpha Mission
- Athena
- Baseball Stars
- Crystalis
- Fighting Golf
- Guerrilla War
- Ikari Warriors
- Ikari Warriors II: Victory Road
- Ikari Warriors III: The Rescue
- Iron Tank
- Little League Baseball: Championship Series
- Mechanized Attack
- P.O.W.: Prisoners of War
- Satomi Hakkenden (Japan only)
- Touchdown Fever

=== Game Boy ===
- Dexterity (Funny Field)
- The King of Fighters '95
- The King of Fighters '96
- Real Bout Fatal Fury Special
- Samurai Shodown (1993)
- Samurai Shodown III
- World Heroes 2 Jet

=== Super NES ===
- Art of Fighting
- Art of Fighting 2
- Fatal Fury: King of Fighters
- Fatal Fury 2
- Fatal Fury Special
- King of the Monsters
- King of the Monsters 2
- Magical Drop 2
- Samurai Shodown (1993)
- Sengoku Denshou
- Super Baseball 2020
- World Heroes
- World Heroes 2

=== Sega Genesis ===
- Art of Fighting
- Fatal Fury: King of Fighters
- Fatal Fury 2
- King of the Monsters
- King of the Monsters 2
- Samurai Shodown (1993)
- Street Smart
- Super Baseball 2020
- Viewpoint
- World Heroes

=== Game Gear ===
- Fatal Fury Special
- Samurai Shodown (1993)

=== Sega CD ===
- Fatal Fury Special
- Samurai Shodown (1993)
- Sengoku Denshou

=== PC Engine Arcade CD-ROM^{2} ===
- Art of Fighting
- Fatal Fury 2
- Fatal Fury Special
- World Heroes 2

=== 3DO ===
- Samurai Shodown (1993)

== Other consoles (1996–2002) ==
=== Sega Saturn ===
- Fatal Fury 3: Road to the Final Victory
- The King of Fighters '95
- The King of Fighters '96
- The King of Fighters '97
- The King of Fighters Best Collection
- Metal Slug
- Real Bout Fatal Fury
- Real Bout Fatal Fury Best Collection
- Real Bout Fatal Fury Special
- Samurai Shodown III: Blades of Blood
- Samurai Shodown IV: Amasuka's Revenge
- Samurai Shodown RPG
- Shin-Oh-Ken
- Stakes Winner 2
- Twinkle Star Sprites
- World Heroes Perfect

=== PlayStation ===
- Fatal Fury: Wild Ambition
- The King of Fighters '95
- The King of Fighters '96
- The King of Fighters '97
- The King of Fighters '98
- The King of Fighters '99
- The King of Fighters: Kyo
- Athena: Awakening from the Ordinary Life
- Koudelka
- The Last Blade
- Metal Slug
- Metal Slug X
- Real Bout Fatal Fury
- Real Bout Fatal Fury Special: Dominated Mind (Real Bout Garou Densetsu Special: Dominated Mind)
- Samurai Shodown 1+2
- Samurai Shodown III: Blades of Blood
- Samurai Shodown IV Special
- Samurai Shodown IV: Amakusa's Revenge
- Samurai Shodown: Warriors Rage (Samurai Shodown Shinshou)
- Samurai Shodown RPG

=== Dreamcast ===
- Cool Cool Toon
- Garou: Mark of the Wolves
- The King of Fighters: Dream Match '99
- The King of Fighters: Evolution
- The King of Fighters 2000
- The King of Fighters 2001
- The King of Fighters 2002
- Nakoruru: Ano Hito kara no Okurimono
- The Last Blade 2
- Twinkle Star Sprites

== Other consoles (2002–12) ==
=== PlayStation 2 ===
- Art of Fighting Anthology
- Fatal Fury Battle Archives Vol. 1
- Fatal Fury Battle Archives Vol. 2
- Garou: Mark of the Wolves
- The King of Fighters '94 Re-Bout
- The King of Fighters '98: Ultimate Match
- The King of Fighters 2000
- The King of Fighters 2001
- The King of Fighters 2002
- The King of Fighters: Neowave
- The King of Fighters 2002: Unlimited Match
- The King of Fighters 2003
- The King of Fighters XI
- The King of Fighters Orochi Collection
- The King of Fighters: Orochi Hen (NeoGeo Online Collection Vol. 3)
- The King of Fighters: Nests Hen (NeoGeo Online Collection Vol. 7)
- KOF: Maximum Impact
- KOF: Maximum Impact 2
- Metal Slug Anthology
- Metal Slug (2006)
- Metal Slug 3
- Metal Slug 4
- Metal Slug 5
- Metal Slug 6
- Neo Geo Battle Coliseum
- Samurai Shodown V
- Samurai Shodown VI
- Samurai Shodown Anthology
- The Last Blade
- The Last Blade 2
- SNK Arcade Classics Vol. 1
- SNK vs. Capcom: SVC Chaos
- Sunsoft Collection
- World Heroes Anthology
- ADK Damashii
- Twinkle Star Sprites: La Petite Princesse

=== Game Boy Advance ===
- The King of Fighters EX: Neo Blood
- The King of Fighters EX2: Howling Blood
- Metal Slug Advance

=== Xbox ===
- The King of Fighters 2002
- The King of Fighters 2003
- The King of Fighters Neowave
- KOF: Maximum Impact Maniax
- Metal Slug 3
- Metal Slug 4
- Metal Slug 5
- Samurai Shodown V
- SNK vs. Capcom: SVC Chaos

=== Nintendo DS ===
- Days of Memories
- Days of Memories 2
- Days of Memories 3
- Doki Doki Majo Shinpan!
- Doki Doki Majo Shinpan! 2 DUO
- Doki Majo Plus
- Kimi no Yusha
- Metal Slug 7
- SNK vs. Capcom: Card Fighters DS

=== PlayStation Portable ===
- The King of Fighters Collection: The Orochi Saga
- Metal Slug Anthology
- Metal Slug XX
- Neo Geo Heroes: Ultimate Shooting
- Samurai Shodown Anthology
- SNK Arcade Classics Vol. 0
- SNK Arcade Classics Vol. 1
- Strikers 1945 Plus

=== Xbox 360 ===
- Fatal Fury Special (via Xbox Live Arcade)
- Garou: Mark of the Wolves (via Xbox Live Arcade)
- The King of Fighters '98: Ultimate Match (via Xbox Live Arcade)
- The King of Fighters 2002: Unlimited Match (via Xbox Live Arcade)
- The King of Fighters XII
- The King of Fighters XIII
- KOF Sky Stage (via Xbox Live Arcade)
- Metal Slug 3 (via Xbox Live Arcade)
- Metal Slug XX (via Xbox Live Arcade)
- Neo Geo Battle Coliseum (via Xbox Live Arcade)
- Samurai Shodown II (via Xbox Live Arcade)
- Samurai Shodown Sen
- Trouble Witches Neo! (via Xbox Live Arcade)

=== Wii ===
- The King of Fighters Collection: The Orochi Saga
- Metal Slug Anthology
- Samurai Shodown Anthology
- SNK Arcade Classics Vol. 1

=== PlayStation 3 ===
- The King of Fighters XII
- The King of Fighters XIII

== Other consoles (2016–present) ==
=== PlayStation 4 ===
- The King of Fighters XIV
- SNK Heroines: Tag Team Frenzy
- The King of Fighters '98: Ultimate Match
- The King of Fighters 2002: Unlimited Match
- SNK 40th Anniversary Collection
- Metal Slug XX
- Samurai Shodown (2019)
- Samurai Shodown Neo Geo Collection
- The King of Fighters XV
- The King of Fighters XIII Global Match
- Metal Slug Attack Reloaded
- SNK vs. Capcom: SVC Chaos
- Fatal Fury: City of the Wolves

=== Xbox One ===
- SNK 40th Anniversary Collection
- Samurai Shodown (2019)
- Samurai Shodown Neo Geo Collection

=== Nintendo Switch ===
- SNK Heroines: Tag Team Frenzy
- SNK 40th Anniversary Collection
- Samurai Shodown (2019)
- Samurai Shodown Neo Geo Collection
- Neo Geo Pocket Color Selection Vol. 1
- Neo Geo Pocket Color Selection Vol. 2
- The King of Fighters XIII Global Match
- Metal Slug Attack Reloaded
- SNK vs. Capcom: SVC Chaos
- Metal Slug Ultimate Collection

=== PlayStation 5 ===
- The King of Fighters XV
- Metal Slug Attack Reloaded
- Fatal Fury: City of the Wolves
- Metal Slug Ultimate Collection
- Metal Slug 8 3D

=== Xbox Series X/S ===
- Samurai Shodown (2019)
- The King of Fighters XV
- Metal Slug Attack Reloaded
- Fatal Fury: City of the Wolves
- Metal Slug Ultimate Collection
- Metal Slug 8 3D

=== Nintendo Switch 2 ===
- Fatal Fury: City of the Wolves
- Metal Slug Ultimate Collection
- Metal Slug 8 3D

== PC ==
=== Windows ===
- Fatal Fury 3: Road to the Final Victory
- Metal Slug Collection PC
- The King of Fighters: Evolution
- Samurai Shodown II

=== Microsoft Store ===
- 3 Count Bout
- Aero Fighters 2
- Aero Fighters 3
- Aggressors of Dark Kombat
- Alpha Mission II
- Art of Fighting
- Art of Fighting 2
- Art of Fighting 3: The Path of the Warrior
- Blue's Journey
- Burning Fight
- Crossed Swords
- Cyber-Lip
- Fatal Fury: King of Fighters
- Fatal Fury 2
- Fatal Fury 3: Road to the Final Victory
- Fatal Fury Special
- Galaxy Fight: Universal Warriors
- Ghost Pilots
- Gururin
- Karnov's Revenge
- The King of Fighters '94
- The King of Fighters '95
- The King of Fighters '96
- The King of Fighters '99
- The King of Fighters 2001
- The King of Fighters 2003
- The King of Fighters XV
- King of the Monsters
- King of the Monsters 2
- Kizuna Encounter
- The Last Blade
- The Last Blade 2
- Last Resort
- League Bowling
- Magician Lord
- Metal Slug
- Metal Slug 4
- Metal Slug 5
- Mutation Nation
- NAM-1975
- Neo Turf Masters
- Ninja Combat
- Ninja Commando
- Ninja Master's
- Over Top
- Power Spikes II
- Pulstar
- Puzzle Bobble
- Puzzle Bobble 2
- Puzzled
- Ragnagard
- Real Bout Fatal Fury
- Real Bout Fatal Fury Special
- Riding Hero
- Robo Army
- Samurai Shodown (1993)
- Samurai Shodown II
- Samurai Shodown III
- Samurai Shodown IV
- Samurai Shodown V
- Samurai Shodown V Special
- Savage Reign
- Sengoku
- Sengoku 2
- Spinmaster
- Stakes Winner
- Stakes Winner 2
- Street Slam
- Strikers 1945 Plus
- Super Baseball 2020
- Super Sidekicks
- The Super Spy
- Top Hunter: Roddy & Cathy
- Twinkle Star Sprites
- World Heroes
- World Heroes 2
- World Heroes 2 Jet
- World Heroes Perfect
- Zed Blade
- ZuPaPa!

=== Steam ===
- Baseball Stars 2
- Fatal Fury: City of the Wolves
- Garou: Mark of the Wolves
- The King of Fighters '97 Global Match
- The King of Fighters '98: Ultimate Match Final Edition
- The King of Fighters 2002: Unlimited Match
- The King of Fighters XIII Steam Edition
- The King of Fighters XIV Steam Edition
- The King of Fighters XV
- Kizuna Encounter: Super Tag Battle "4Way Battle Version" (Fu'un Super Tag Battle "Special Version")
- The Last Blade
- The Last Blade 2
- Metal Slug
- Metal Slug 2
- Metal Slug 3
- Metal Slug X
- Metal Slug XX
- Metal Slug Attack Reloaded
- Metal Slug Defense
- Neo Geo Pocket Color Selection Vol. 1
- Neo Geo Pocket Color Selection Vol. 2
- Real Bout Fatal Fury 2: The Newcomers
- SNK 40th Anniversary Collection
- SNK Heroines: Tag Team Frenzy
- SNK vs. Capcom: SVC Chaos
- Samurai Shodown V Special
- Samurai Shodown Neo Geo Collection
- Samurai Shodown (2019)
- Shock Troopers
- Shock Troopers: 2nd Squad
- Twinkle Star Sprites
- Metal Slug Ultimate Collection
- Metal Slug 8 3D

=== Humble Bundle ===
- Art of Fighting 2
- Baseball Stars 2
- Blazing Star
- Fatal Fury Special
- Garou: Mark of the Wolves
- Ironclad
- The King of Fighters 2000
- The King of Fighters 2002: Challenge To Ultimate Battle
- The Last Blade
- Metal Slug
- Metal Slug 2
- Metal Slug 3
- Metal Slug X
- Neo Turf Masters
- Pulstar
- Real Bout Fatal Fury 2: The Newcomers
- Samurai Shodown II
- Samurai Shodown V Special
- Sengoku 3
- Shock Troopers
- Shock Troopers: 2nd Squad
- Twinkle Star Sprites

=== Epic Games Store ===
- Samurai Shodown (2019)
- Samurai Shodown Neo Geo Collection
- The King of Fighters XV
- Fatal Fury: City of the Wolves

== Mobile phones ==
- Blazing Star
- Fatal Fury Special
- Garou: Mark of the Wolves
- The King of Fighters-A 2012
- The King of Fighters-i 2012
- The King of Fighters '97
- The King of Fighters '98
- Metal Slug
- Metal Slug 2
- Metal Slug 3
- Metal Slug X
- Metal Slug Attack
- Metal Slug Defense
- Samurai Shodown II
- The King of Fighters All Star
- The King of Fighters Arena
