= Samurai Shodown Anthology =

- US box art for PS2 version
- Developer: Terminal Reality
- Publisher: SNK Playmore: EU: Ignition Entertainment
- Series: Samurai Shodown
- Platforms: PlayStation 2, PlayStation Portable, Wii
- Release: July 24, 2008: PlayStation 2; JP: July 24, 2008; NA: March 24, 2009; EU: March 27, 2009; Wii; JP: July 24, 2008; EU: March 27, 2009; NA: April 14, 2009; PlayStation Portable; NA: March 24, 2009; EU: March 27, 2009
- Genre: Fighting
- Modes: Single-player, multiplayer

Samurai Shodown Anthology (Note: Japanese: サムライスピリッツ 六番勝負, Hepburn: Samurai Supirittsu Rokuban Shobu; lit. Samurai Spirits: The Sixth Match) is a 2008 fighting game compilation featuring the Samurai Shodown series released by SNK Playmore for the PlayStation 2, PlayStation Portable and Wii. This release does not include Samurai Shodown V Special, which made significant changes to the original release. It was re-released as a downloadable game on the PlayStation Store for PSP on October 1, 2009.

== Games included ==
- Samurai Shodown (1993)
- Samurai Shodown II (1994)
- Samurai Shodown III: Blades of Blood (1995)
- Samurai Shodown IV: Amakusa's Revenge (1996)
- Samurai Shodown V (2003)
- Samurai Shodown VI (2005)
