= Samurai Shodown V Special =

2004 video game

- Developer: Yuki Enterprise
- Publisher: SNK Playmore
- Producer: Yasuo Tanaka
- Designers: Dorio Takaya; Tōru Sakurai
- Programmers: M. Kawamura; Yoshihiro Nakamura
- Artists: Chihiro Takahashi; Taniuchi Yuho; T. Matsuura
- Composers: Haruhiko Kuroiwa; Kennosuke Suemura
- Series: Samurai Shodown
- Platforms: Arcade, Neo Geo AES
- Release: Arcade: JP: April 22, 2004; Neo Geo AES: WW: July 15, 2004
- Genre: Fighting
- Modes: Single-player, multiplayer
- Arcade system: Neo Geo MVS exA-Arcadia (Perfect)

Samurai Shodown V Special (Note: Also known as Samurai Spirits Zero Special (Japanese: サムライスピリッツ 零 SPECIAL, Hepburn: Samurai Supirittsu Zero Special) in Japan.) is a 2004 fighting game developed by Yuki Enterprise and published by SNK Playmore for the Neo Geo arcade and home platforms. It is the ninth installment in the Samurai Shodown series of fighting games. It is an updated version of Samurai Shodown V and is the last official game for the Neo Geo platform. A further updated version of the game had its location test abruptly canceled in late 2004 and would not be officially released until 2020 as part of the Samurai Shodown NeoGeo Collection as Samurai Shodown V Perfect. A fully uncensored version of this final update was released only in arcades on exA-Arcadia on September 29, 2022.

== Gameplay ==
Gameplay screenshot showcasing a match between Haohmaru and Sogetsu Kazama.

The essential mechanics remained largely unchanged from previous games, with the update being directed towards graphical and audio changes. The updated visuals include portraits by artist Satoshi Ito, which convey a dark atmosphere similar to that of Samurai Shodown III.

A significant number of changes exist between Samurai Shodown V and Samurai Shodown V Special. Among them, the characters Sankuro and Yumeji were replaced with Samurai Shodown boss, Amakusa Shiro Tokisada, and Samurai Shodown III boss, Zankuro Minazuki. Also, the hidden character Poppy was replaced with Samurai Shodown II boss, Mizuki Rashojin, and was playable without the need of a hidden code. In addition to the roster change, many graphics and sound changes were made to give the game a fresh feel, even though most of the returning characters used their old voices, dating from Samurai Shodown IV. Existing Samurai Shodown V character stages were modified, and new stages were made for the arrival of Amakusa, Zankuro, and Mizuki.

This game also received many gameplay tweaks, making this version much more balanced than its predecessor. However, the biggest gameplay change was the introduction of the Zetsumei Ougi, or the Overkill Move. When performed correctly, it instantly ends the match for its victim, regardless of how much life he/she has remaining. This concept is similar to that of the Guilty Gear series, except that the conditions for the move are much stricter. The character must be in a rage, and the opponent's life must be below the point where they could have entered Concentration One, introduced in Samurai Shodown V as a special slow-motion mode powered up by meditating (holding D while standing still). The start-up motion is the same for each character, but if it hits the attacking character, it can finish off their victim in their own unique fashion.

In addition to the overkill moves, generic fatality effects from Samurai Shodown IV were brought back for this game, such as being slashed in half horizontally. New fatality effects were also added, such as being split in half vertically with the victim drenching their opponent in blood. In addition, Nakoruru and Rimururu, who were both made "immune" to fatal effects in Samurai Shodown III and Samurai Shodown IV, are able to experience these fatal effects at the end of the match, and, in some situations, they scream violently.

This combination of violent acts in Samurai Shodown V Special generated much controversy and resulted in SNK Playmore censoring the Neo Geo AES cartridge shortly after the Sasebo slashing.

== Plot ==
A meeting of 28 fierce warriors begins, destined to go through a series of deadly duels, where only the best will survive.

The twenty-eight Samurai characters clash in one epic title.

== Release ==
As the AES version of the game was approaching its release date on July 8, 2004, it was mysteriously delayed a week, moving its release date to the 15th. When it came out, the generic fatalities were removed and the Zetsumei Ougi was watered down to a loosely based version of the issen for the characters. This act of censorship affected the entire worldwide release, not just the non-Japanese speaking audience. Not only did these modifications censor the game, but the censorship also created bugs, such as that of the AES's exclusive training mode, and upon hearing fan outcry, SNK did a cart recall shortly after that which fixed the bugs brought about by the censoring acts, and also to partially restore the character specific Zetsumei Ougis. The acts of body splitting were still completely gone. This meant some of the Zetsumei Ougis made no sense. However, some of the more violent content still remained, such as the more violent death screams and being able to be smashed into a wall. The only way for players outside of an arcade to experience the Zetsumei Ougis was either through emulation or to get an unfixed version of the game and apply Razoola's Universe Bios to it, which allows access to the uncensored versions of the moves and fixes the bugs that the censorship created.

Over a decade later, the game was released by SNK and Code Mystics for the PlayStation 4 and PlayStation Vita on September 12, 2017. The game is fully intact with the uncensored content in addition to settings to change the violence and blood in the Options mode. Unlike the previous Samurai Shodown V that receives a "T" rating, the upgraded version receives an "M" rating by the ESRB in North America. It also included online multiplayer modes, a Gallery mode featuring the artwork of the characters, trophies and ranking modes. Hamster Corporation re-released the game as part of their ACA Neo Geo series for the PlayStation 4, Xbox One, Nintendo Switch, Windows, Android and iOS. It was the final game in the series until it was revived in 2026.

Samurai Shodown V Perfect featured a non-canon storyline that would tie in with Samurai Shodown VI, a dream match. Like the uncensored V Special, V Perfect retained the Zetsumei Ougis but removed the resulting body dismemberment and mutilations. Samurai Shodown V Perfect for arcades on exA-Arcadia restored the original Zetsumei Ougis resulting in body dismemberment and mutilations. It also has a brand new English localization and new art from Samurai Shodown III artist, Shiroh Ohno.
