= Monster Maezuka =

Japanese voice actor (born 1962)

- 前塚 モンスター
- Born: Atsushi Maezuka; March 19, 1962 (age 64); Osaka, Japan
- Occupation: Voice actor

Monster Maezuka (前塚 モンスター, Maezuka Monsuta; born as Atsushi Maezuka (前塚 厚志, Maezuka Atsushi), on March 19, 1962 in Osaka, Japan) is a Japanese voice actor currently associated with the Clutch voice actor agency. Maezuka is noted for his roles as Ralf Jones, Benimaru Nikaido, and Choi Bounge in The King of Fighters fighting game series. He has also voiced the latter two in Capcom vs. SNK, and the first in The King of Fighters: Another Day anime; in addition to that, he has had voiceover experience playing Sling and the narrator in the original Japanese version of Beast Wars Neo. Maezuka is also noted for having done the voices of Kyoshiro Senryo and Nicotine Caffeine in the Samurai Shodown series, as well as Ken Masters in SNK vs. Capcom: SVC Chaos.

== Filmography ==
=== Animation ===
- The King of Fighters: Another Day (2006) – Ralf Jones
- The King of Fighters: Destiny (2017–2018) – Benimaru Nikaido, Choi Bounge

=== Video games ===
- The King of Fighters '94 (1994) – Benimaru Nikaido, Choi Bounge, Ralf Jones
- Samurai Shodown II (1994) – Kyoshiro Senryo, Nicotine Caffeine
- The King of Fighters '95 (1995) – Benimaru Nikaido, Choi Bounge, Ralf Jones
- Samurai Shodown III (1995) – Kyoshiro Senryo
- Art of Fighting 3: The Path of the Warrior (1996) – Wang Koh-San, Wyler
- The King of Fighters '96 (1996) – Benimaru Nikaido, Choi Bounge, Ralf Jones
- Samurai Shodown IV (1996) – Kyoshiro Senryo
- The King of Fighters '97 (1997) – Benimaru Nikaido, Choi Bounge, Ralf Jones
- The Last Blade (1997) – Shikyoh
- The King of Fighters '98 (1998) – Benimaru Nikaido, Choi Bounge, Ralf Jones
- The King of Fighters: Kyo (1998) – Benimaru Nikaido, Choi Bounge, Ralf Jones
- The Last Blade 2 (1998) – Mukuro
- The King of Fighters '99 (1999) – Benimaru Nikaido, Choi Bounge, Ralf Jones
- The King of Fighters 2000 (2000) – Benimaru Nikaido, Choi Bounge, Ralf Jones
- Capcom vs. SNK: Millennium Fight 2000 (2000) – Benimaru Nikaido
- Capcom vs. SNK 2: Millionaire Fighting 2001 (2001) – Benimaru Nikaido, Choi Bounge
- The King of Fighters 2001 (2001) – Benimaru Nikaido, Choi Bounge, Ralf Jones
- The King of Fighters 2002 (2002) – Benimaru Nikaido, Choi Bounge, Ralf Jones
- SNK vs. Capcom: SVC Chaos (2003) – Choi Bounge, Ken Masters
- Samurai Shodown V (2003) – Kyoshiro Senryo
- The King of Fighters 2003 (2003) – Benimaru Nikaido, Ralf Jones
- The King of Fighters: Maximum Impact (2004) – Ralf Jones
- The King of Fighters Neowave (2005) – Benimaru Nikaido, Choi Bounge, Ralf Jones
- NeoGeo Battle Coliseum (2005) – Fuuma, Mudman
- The King of Fighters XI (2005) – Benimaru Nikaido, Ralf Jones
- The King of Fighters: Maximum Impact 2 (2006) – Ralf Jones
- The King of Fighters XII (2009) – Benimaru Nikaido
- The King of Fighters XIII (2010) – Benimaru Nikaido
- The King of Fighters XIV (2016) – Benimaru Nikaido, Choi Bounge
- The King of Fighters All Star (2018) – Benimaru Nikaido, Choi Bounge
- Samurai Shodown (2019) – Kyoshiro Senryo
- The King of Fighters XV (2022) – Benimaru Nikaido
