= Aero Fighters 2 =

1994 video game

- Arcade flyer
- Developer: Video System
- Publisher: SNK
- Designers: A. Ōkawara; Katsuyuki Yamamotoya; Hiroko Yokoyama
- Composers: Hiroyuki Itou; Norie Aoki; Soshi Hosoi
- Series: Aero Fighters
- Platforms: Arcade, Neo Geo AES, Neo Geo CD
- Release: July 18, 1994: Arcade; JP: July 18, 1994; NA: August 1994 Neo Geo AES; JP: August 26, 1994; NA: 1994 Neo Geo CD; JP/NA: September 29, 1994
- Genre: Scrolling shooter
- Modes: Single-player, multiplayer
- Arcade system: Neo Geo MVS

Aero Fighters 2, released in Japan as Sonic Wings 2 (Note: Japanese: ソニックウィングス2, Hepburn: Sonikkū~ingusu 2), is a 1994 vertically scrolling shooter video game developed by Video System and published by SNK for the Neo Geo arcade and home platforms. It is the second installment of the Aero Fighters series, followed by the sequel Aero Fighters 3 (1995) and the spin-off Aero Fighters Assault (1997).

Hamster Corporation acquired the rights to the game alongside Video System's catalogue, re-releasing the game as part of their ACA Neo Geo series for the PlayStation 4, Xbox One, Nintendo Switch, Windows, Android and iOS.

== Gameplay ==
Gameplay screenshot

The game is played with two buttons, with the A button firing projectiles from the plane and the B button launching a special bomb attack which uses a bomb from a limited stock of bombs. Power projectiles can be obtained by destroying buildings and armored enemy planes. There are two types of Power projectiles: "P" Power projectiles, which increase the plane's firepower by one level, and "F" Power projectiles, which increase the plane's firepower to the maximum level instantly. The maximum level only lasts for a limited number of shots. When certain ground enemies and buildings are destroyed, money bonuses appear which give a set number of points based on how fast the player destroys them and how quickly they collected the bonus. When the player reaches the end of the stage, they must face a boss ship. There are ten levels. Once those levels are beaten, there is a character-specific ending. The game then loops with palette changes, but after the looped stages are beaten, the game truly ends.

== Reception ==
Reception

Aggregate score
Aggregator	Score
GameRankings	(NS) 90%

Review scores
Publication	Score
AllGame	(NG) 3/5
Famitsu	(NG) 28/40
GamePro	(NG) 14/20
HobbyConsolas	(NG) 90/100
Joypad	(NGCD) 75%
M! Games	(NG) 63%
Mega Fun	(NG) 71%
Next Generation	(NG) 2/5
Nintendo Life	(NS) 9/10
Player One	(NGCD) 70%
Superjuegos	(NGCD) 91/100
CD Consoles	(NGCD) 2/5
Computer+Videogiochi	(NGCD) 85/100
VideoGames	(NG) 7/10

In Japan, Game Machine listed Aero Fighters 2 as the seventh most popular arcade game of August 1994. In North America, RePlay reported it to be the fifth most popular arcade game of September 1994. Play Meter also listed it as the 57th most popular arcade game of September 1994.

The game was met with generally positive reception from critics, and holds a 90% on the video game review aggregator GameRankings. AllGame's Kyle Knight praised the variety of ships and backgrounds, sound, level designs and gameplay, but criticized its replay value. GamePro's Captain Squideo gave it a generally positive review. While citing some issues with slowdown and an absence of sound effects for the player's jet, as well as a general lack of originality, he considered it an overall enjoyable shooter with fun weapons, huge bosses, and "crisp" controls. Next Generation reviewed the Neo Geo version of the game, stating that "players with any skill will beat the game on the easy or normal level in under an hour. The higher levels offer more challenges, but not new ones".

Hobby Consolas's Manuel del Campo praised the graphical design of stages and enemies despite the small size of the player's plane, music, playability and ship variety, but criticized the lack of variety with sound design and "wow factor". Joypad's Benji regarded the Neo Geo CD version to be disappointing, writing that "we found ourselves in front of a game which would have been all the rage (although!) On Neo cartridge five years ago. Because even soundtrack side, for CD, the result is trivial". MAN!AC's Ingo Zaborowski commended the visuals but criticized the music for being inappropriate and unmotivated, comparing the game to Raiden II and Twin Eagle II. Mega Fun's Martin Weidner visually compared the game to Last Resort and Viewpoint, criticizing the music, slowdown during gameplay, and lack of additional options.

Player One's Christophe Delpierre reviewed the Neo Geo CD version, remarking that the graphics needed more work and criticized the levels for their short length, concluding that "in short, Aero Fighters 2, without being bad, still disappoints a little. On Neo CD, we are entitled to expect much better". Like Manuel del Campo, Superjuegos' Roberto Serrano praised the visual design, music, sound design and playability but criticized the occurrence of slowdown when many sprites are displayed on-screen, stating that the sequel far exceeds its predecessor. CD Consoles' David Taborda commended the audiovisual presentation and playability, but criticized its creativity on display and slowdown during gameplay; he nevertheless regarded it to be a good game. Computer+Videogiochi's Maurizio Miccoli reviewed the Neo Geo CD version, praising the gameplay, longevity, and presentation. VideoGames' Gabe Soria commended the game's playability, but noted it was neither new nor special, pointing out how the graphics were similar to those of the original Aero Fighters and comparing the sound design to Apocalypse Now.

Aero Fighters 2 has been met with mostly positive reception from retrospective reviewers in recent years. In 2014, HobbyConsolas named it one of the twenty best games for the Neo Geo AES. Nintendo Life's Dave Frear praised the Nintendo Switch version for the addition of high score and caravan modes, selection of planes, enemy variety, action and multiple endings.
