= Kazuro Morita =

Japanese computer programmer and video game developer

- 森田 和郎
- Born: 1955; Toyama, Toyama, Japan
- Died: July 27, 2012 (aged 56–57); Japan
- Education: Saitama Medical University
- Occupation: Game designer
- Years active: 1982–2012

Kazuro Morita (森田 和郎, Morita Kazurō) (1955 – July 27, 2012) was a Japanese video game designer known for his work on the Morita's Shogi video game series. Becoming interested in computer programming during high school, he entered magazine competitions during his university years, creating video game versions of board games. He won a competition organised by Enix in 1982 with the video game Morita's Battlefield, which was published the following year to great commercial success.

Following this success he established Random House, developing his Shogi series and several other game projects, several published by Enix. From 1999, he remained as a programmer for Yuki Entertainment (later Examu) following their acquisition of Random House's properties. He continued acting as a company manager while contributing to the programming of titles including Samurai Shodown V and VI. Among those whom he was survived by are his wife Sakicho, and his brother politician Takashi Morita.

== Early life ==
Kazuro Morita was born in 1955 in Toyama, capital of Toyama Prefecture in Japan's Chūbu region; his family were established professionals in internal medicine and obstetrics and gynaecology. He was the oldest of three brothers, with one of his younger brothers being politician Takashi Morita. While attending Toyama Prefectural Toyama Chubu High School, he had the opportunity to work with a programmable calculator, where he became interested in programming. After his high school graduation in 1973 he entered the Tokyo Institute of Technology's Department of Organic Chemistry, but dropped out in 1975 after having to repeat a year, and after another year in Toyama entered Saitama Medical University. During his second university year, he spent time working with an NEC TK-80, using it to create his first project, an electronic version of the board game Othello. He took part in electronics magazine competitions with his work, using royalties from a successful submission to buy a PC-8801 for programming.

== Career ==
Seeking game proposals following its entry into the video game market in 1982, Enix organized a competition dubbed the "Enix Game Hobby Program Contest" in both computer and manga magazines, offering a prize of ¥1 million (US$10,000) for a game prototype which could be published by Enix. Morita 's submission was a simulation video game called Morita's Battlefield. Morita won the grand prize, being among a notable group of designers who were accepted by Enix alongside Yuji Horii and Koichi Nakamura. Morita's Battlefield was published in February 1983, earning royalties of ¥5 million. Uusing the money Morita established Random House with a number of university friends. Beginning in 1983, Morita created a video game version of the board game shogi, with it being published in 1985 under the title Morita's Shogi, and starting off a series of similar games.

Enix would publish several of Random House's products over the coming years, including his Shogi series and Just Breed. He was programmer for Minelvaton Saga: Ragon no Fukkatsu, which was his first time working on a role-playing video game. Another notable project was Alphos, which began development was a homage to Namco's Xevious series, going on to receive permission to develop Alphos as a Xevious spin-off. In 1998, Random House was bought out by Yuki Entertainment (later Examu). Morita continued to work at Yuki Entertainment as a programmer and company manager. One of his notable contributions was help with the development work for Samurai Shodown V.

== Personal life and death ==
Morita's video game work is characterised by being "thinking games", and making use of advanced or complex programming. One of his notable works was Alphos, which he started as a programming exercise before it became an official commercial project. He was also noted by co-workers as a helpful and open person. For his work on the Shogi series, he was referred to as a foundational figure in shogi computer games. He was a 4th Dan at shogi, a 3rd Dan at Go, and a 2nd Dan at Othello.

During his later years he suffered from unspecified ill health, having trouble walking. On one occasion he fell down and broke his arm, but continued to do programming work on one arm. Morita died on July 27, 2012. He had a private funeral attended by his immediate family, with his wife Sachiko as chief mourner. The death was not announced publicly until June 2013.
