= Cool Cool Toon =

2000 video game

- Developer: SNK
- Publisher: SNK
- Platform: Dreamcast
- Release: JP: August 10, 2000
- Genre: Rhythm
- Modes: Single-player, multiplayer

Cool Cool Toon (Note: Japanese: クルクルトゥーン, Hepburn: Kuru Kuru To~ūn) is a 2000 rhythm video game developed and published by SNK for the Dreamcast. It was released only in Japan on August 10, 2000, alongside Cool Cool Jam, a companion game for the Neo Geo Pocket Color.

== Gameplay ==
The letters A, B, X, and Y appear at the edge or in the middle of a large circle on the screen. The player must use the analog stick to move a marker to the letter and press the corresponding button on the controller at the right time. If the player misses too many letters, they level down. If the performance level goes to zero or is too low, the game ends.

== Characters ==
=== Main characters ===
Amp (アンプ, Anpu)
Voiced by: Junko Takeuchi
The main male human protagonist. A somewhat timid boy who was brought to Cool Cool Town. Encouraged by Yusa, he learns about the power of flitz.
Spica (スピカ, Supika)
Voiced by: Asami Saitō, Yumi Kakazu (older form)
The main female human protagonist. A lively girl who was brought to Cool Cool Town. She uses her inherent energy to draw those around her into her world.
Yusa (ユサ, Yusa)
Voiced by: Mami Kingetsu
A pink and white rabbit-like creature who brought Amp and Spica to Cool Cool Town. She was searching for a human who possessed the power of flitz, comparable to King's.
Ival (イバル, Ibaru)
Voiced by: Atsushi "Monster" Maezuka
A young vampire boy who is the son of the King, but harbors a deep grudge against his father due to having been banished by him, and for the King being the one who caused the death of his mom. He lures Amp into a trap in order to confront his father. He is exclusive to Amp's story route.
Iyamy (イヤミィ, Iyamyi)
Voiced by: Haruna Ikezawa
A young witch girl who harbors a rivalry with Spica and speaks in a polite, archaic manner. She is exclusive to Spica's story route.

=== Side characters ===
King (キング, Kingu)
Voiced by: Kōji Ishii
A vampire who is the ruler of all of Cool Cool Town and is known to be the greatest flitzer, befitting his high, powerful position.
Kamio (カミオ, Kamio)
Voiced by: Eiji Yano
A friendly and lovable human boy. Whenever he experiences strong emotions like excitement, he ends up transforming into a murderous and violent werewolf.
Dr. Stein (Dr.スティン, Dr. Sutin)
Voiced by: Makoto Awane
A scientist who attempted to create an artificial human.
Ranke (ランケ, Ranke)
Voiced by: Satomi Nakatani
An artificial "living doll" who was created by Dr. Stein, their flaw being that they lack general human emotions.
Mirror (ミラー, Mirā)
Voiced by: Takenosuke Nishikawa
King's strongest and closest henchman, who is exclusive to Amp's story route.
Mum (マム, Mamu)
Voiced by: Hazuki Nishikawa
King's strongest and closest henchwoman, who is exclusive to Spica's story route.

== Development and release ==
Cool Cool Toon was developed and published by SNK. The composer, Yasumasa Yamada, considered it a fresh game to work on due to it being a game with music as a central premise. He based the soundtrack's tempo on music used by motion-captured music of the time. When making the music, he had to work with the programmers to approach it in the best way. He contributed four songs to the project, with most of the work being done by other members of staff. According to Yamada, the development of the game was very "business-oriented." The art design was led by Ippei Gyoubu.

It was originally teased on March 22, 2000, when SNK posted promotional artwork on their official website. A localized version was planned and aimed for an early 2001 release in North America, but was cancelled due to SNK's impending bankruptcy and the Dreamcast's declining popularity. An English fan translation was released in 2023.

== Reception ==
Reception

Review scores
Publication	Score
AllGame	4/5
Edge	7/10
GameSpot	7/10
IGN	7.8/10
Dreamcast Magazine	7.33/10
Consoles +	83%

The reception of the game has been mostly positive. Reviewers praised the art style and original use of the analogue stick.
