= Top Player's Golf =

1990 video game

- Developer: SNK
- Publisher: SNK
- Platforms: Arcade, Neo Geo AES, Neo Geo CD
- Release: Arcade: WW: May 23, 1990; Neo Geo AES: WW: July 1, 1991; Neo Geo CD: JP: September 9, 1994; NA: October 1996
- Genre: Sports
- Modes: Single-player, multiplayer
- Arcade system: Neo Geo MVS

Top Player's Golf (Note: Japanese: トップ・プレイヤーズ・ゴルフ, Hepburn: Toppu Pureiyāzu Gorufu) is a 1990 golf video game developed and published by SNK for the Neo Geo arcade and home platforms. It was one of the launch titles for both the Neo Geo MVS (arcade) and Neo Geo AES (home) platforms in the United States, the second golf game created by SNK after 1988's Lee Trevino's Fighting Golf, as well as one of the two golf games released for the Neo Geo, with the other one being Nazca Corporation's 1996 Neo Turf Masters.

In the game, the players compete with either computer-controlled opponents or against other players in matches across various golf courses set in two country clubs. The game was re-released through download services for various consoles, among other ways to play it as of date.

Top Player's Golf received mixed reception from critics after its initial launch with praise towards the presentation and digitized voice samples but many were divided in regards to the gameplay and visuals.

== Gameplay ==
Gameplay screenshot

Top Player's Golf is a golf game similar to Lee Trevino's Fighting Golf and other golf titles from the era, where players compete in matches on various golf courses set across two country clubs. There are three game modes and four golfers to choose from at the main menu: Stroke Play is the main single-player mode where one player compete against CPU-controlled opponents in 18 holes. Match Play is similar to the first mode, except that two players compete against each other and the player with the lowest score wins. The last mode, Nassau Game, in which one player competes with either a CPU or another human opponent and the player with the lowest score wins, with events such as longest drive or closest to the pin contests appearing on occasions. Before starting each mode, players have the option of having a caddie for advice and tips in how to complete a course. If a memory card is present, the players are allowed to save their progress and resume into the last course the game saved at.

== Development and release ==
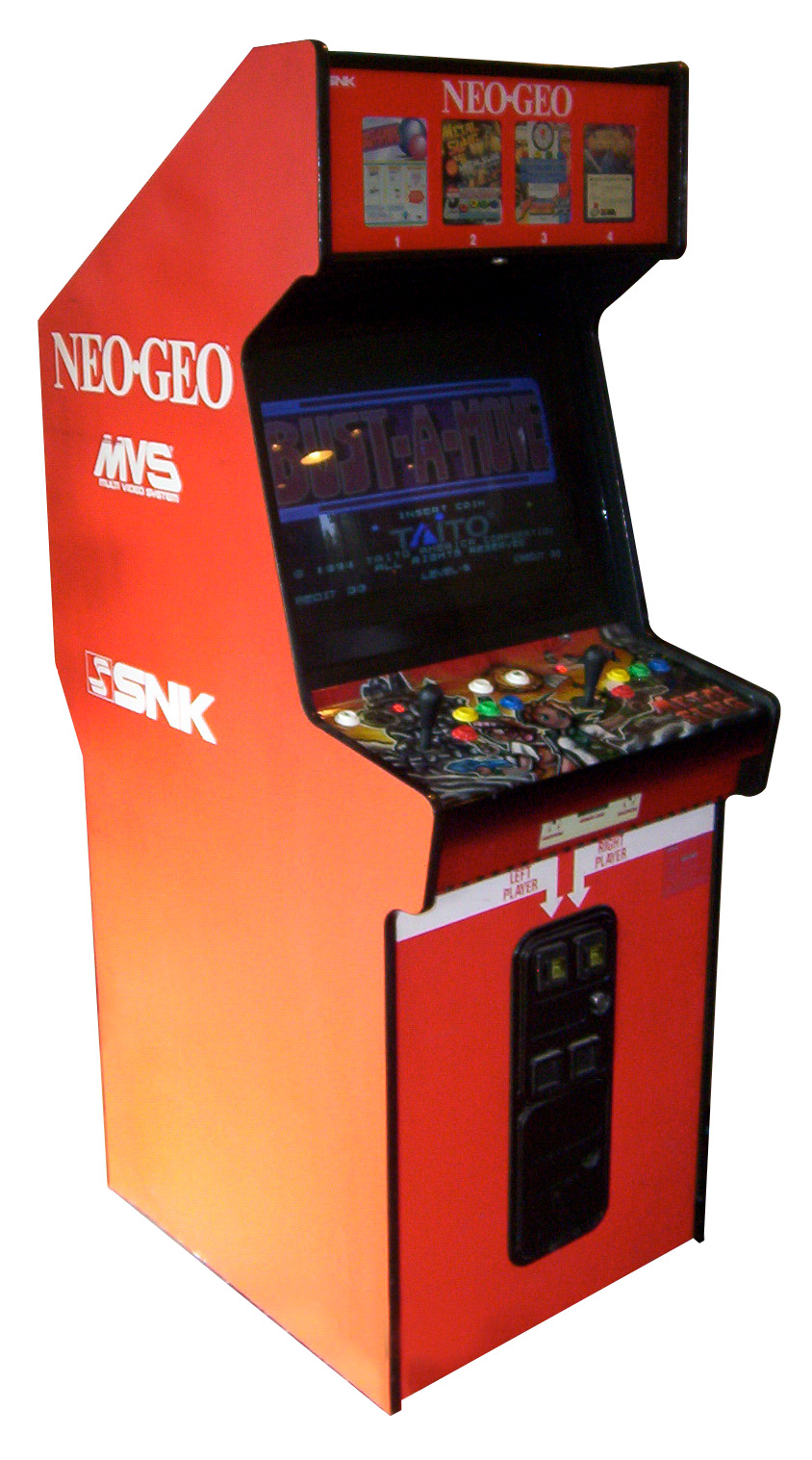
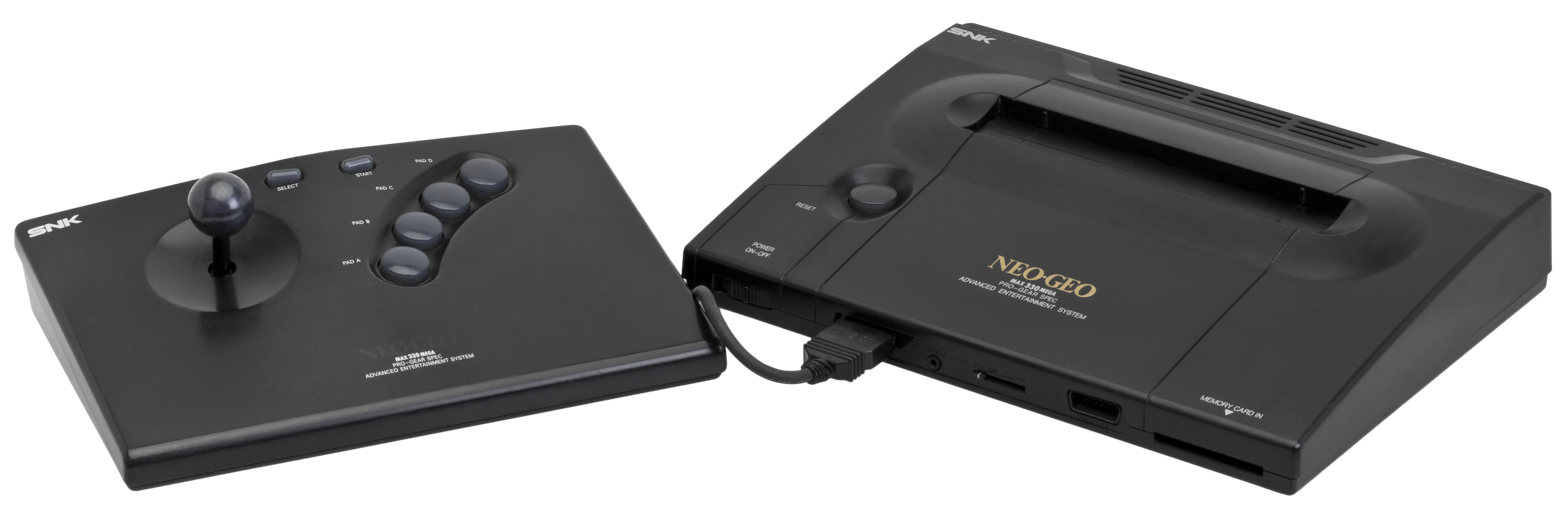
Top Player's Golf became one of the first games released for the Neo Geo MVS (left) and Neo Geo AES (right) when both systems were launched in North America.

Top Player's Golf was initially launched for arcades on May 23, 1990. It was also released during the same period for the Neo Geo AES, when the system was originally a rental-only system for video game stores and hotels in Japan before this was later reversed due to high demand and came to the market as a luxury console on July 1, 1991. It was later re-released for the Neo Geo CD on September 9, 1994, as one of the launch titles for the system, featuring an arranged CD-quality soundtrack and other changes. Hamster Corporation re-released the game as part of their ACA Neo Geo series for the PlayStation 4, Xbox One, Nintendo Switch, Windows, Android and iOS. It was also recently included in the international version of the Neo Geo mini.

== Reception ==
Reception

Review scores
Publication	Score
AllGame	(Neo Geo)
CVG Mean Machines	(Neo Geo) 29%
GamePro	(Neo Geo) 18 / 25
Hobby Hi-Tech	(Neo Geo CD) 6 / 10
Joystick	(Neo Geo) 91% (Neo Geo) 90%
Micom BASIC Magazine	(Neo Geo)

In Japan, Game Machine listed Top Player's Golf on their December 15, 1990 issue as being the twentieth most-successful table arcade unit of the month, outperforming titles such as Quiz H.Q.. The game received mixed reception from critics after its initial launch.
