= Just Breed =

1992 video game

- Developer: Random House
- Publisher: Enix
- Designers: Kazuro Morita; Takashi Yasuno
- Artist: Yuzo Takada
- Writer: Katsuyuki Sato
- Composers: Kōhei Tanaka; Jun Kobayashi; Izuru Aki
- Platform: Famicom
- Release: JP: December 15, 1992
- Genre: Tactical role-playing
- Mode: Single-player

Just Breed (ジャストブリード, Jasuto Burīdo) is a tactical role-playing game published by Enix for the Famicom. It was published exclusively in Japan in 1992. The game was announced nearly three years before release. It is one of the largest RPGs for the Famicom.

== Gameplay ==
The game's six main characters each have their own armies of six soldiers, making the total number of troops thirty-six. Each character has a set character class, which allots them fixed attributes and allows some of them to learn and use certain spells. The leaders are well-rounded Heroes that use both weapons and magic. Wizards rely almost entirely on powerful magic. Fighters battle close-range with a number of weapons. Archers attack from afar using arrows. As in traditional RPGs, battles earn each character experience points which go towards a level up, increasing that character's stats such as hit points, strength, defense, and wisdom.

A large battle with player characters colored blue and enemies colored red.

The gameplay in Just Breed is based on turn-based strategy similar to that of Fire Emblem or Shining Force. The game utilizes a battle system known as "Team Spirits," in which all the units in one army act one after the other. Each character and enemy occupies a single unit on the battlefield. Using a cursor, the player can select an army and execute actions with each character within that army, such as moving or attacking a nearby target, or may view the stats of an enemy. Monster dens on the overworld continuously spawn monsters until a character is moved within range to "unarm" them.

While not in battle, the player can explore towns in which one can purchase items and equipment, engage in storyline events, or casually interact with numerous non-playable characters. Commands can also be used to speak, search the ground, use items and magic, or arrange equipment.

== Plot ==
The game's story opens in the town of Astholm, which is spiritually protected by a sapphire wielded by the priestess Firis. She is one of six priestesses charged with holding a special gem to have together held an archaic power for several generations. During the town's Sapphire Festival, Firis is kidnapped by the henchmen of Ezelkiel, a man bent on collecting the priestesses to revive an ancient evil. The player takes on the role of the nameless Hero who, along with being sworn to protect Astholm, is the lover of Firis. He immediately sets out with his army to rescue the priestess and ends up becoming involved in a much larger-scale predicament involving the world's other priestesses and gems.

== Development ==
Just Breed was announced nearly three years before its release, which took place towards the end of the Famicom's lifecycle. The game was programmed by Kazuro Morita's game company Random House. Manga artist Yuzo Takada, best known for 3×3 Eyes series, designed both the characters and monsters, while anime composer Kōhei Tanaka scored the game. The cartridge for Just Breed includes the MMC5 chip, which boosts the game's graphics and sound. At 6 megabits, it is lauded as one of the largest RPGs for the system. The game was never released outside Japan but an unofficial English patch was created by Stealth Translations in 2004.

== Merchandise ==
Shogakukan published a 144-page strategy guide for the game in January 1993. A 57-page illustration book titled The World of Just Breed was published by Futabasha on June 20, 1993, featuring all of the game's artwork by Yuzo Takada. Futabasha also published a 255-page light novel as part of its fantasy novel series in October 1993.
