= Riding Hero =

1990 video game

- Developer: SNK
- Publisher: SNK
- Director: Hiroshi Matsumoto
- Producer: Eikichi Kawasaki
- Artists: Kimie M. Koichi Sakita; Masayo S.
- Composer: Yasumasa Yamada
- Platforms: Arcade, Neo Geo AES, Neo Geo CD
- Release: Arcade: JP: July 24, 1990; Neo Geo AES: NA/JP: July 1, 1991; Neo Geo CD: JP: May 26, 1995; NA: October 1996
- Genres: Racing, Role-playing
- Modes: Single-player, multiplayer
- Arcade system: Neo Geo MVS

Riding Hero (Note: Japanese: ライディング・ヒーロー, Hepburn: Raidingu Hīrō) is a 1990 racing role-playing video game developed and published by SNK for the Neo Geo arcade and home platforms. It was the first Neo Geo game that featured "Multi Play" (Multi-Link) support, which allowed two systems to be connected via a phone jack port integrated into each cartridge for versus LAN play.

In the game, players have the choice to participate on a worldwide grand prix tour against AI-controlled opponents, assume the role of a protagonist who embark on a quest to enter the Suzuka 8 Hours endurance race or compete in matches against other human players. Riding Hero was first launched for the Neo Geo MVS before being later released for both Neo Geo AES and Neo Geo CD in 1991 and 1995 respectively, in addition to being re-released through download services for various consoles, among other ways to play it as of date.

Since its initial launch, Riding Hero has been met with a mixed reception from both critics and reviewers alike who felt divided in regards to various aspects such as the visuals, sound design, controls and gameplay, though some regarded the single-player role-playing game mode as a novel concept and the multiplayer offering was noted to be one of the game's positive points. Its multiplayer LAN support would later be re-used in other titles for Neo Geo.

== Gameplay ==
Gameplay screenshot

Riding Hero is a racing game that uses a behind-the-motorcycle perspective similar to Super Hang-On and Suzuka 8 Hours featuring a Grand Prix mode, a role-playing single-player campaign mode reminiscent of Final Lap Twin, as well as a multiplayer mode like most other racing titles released in the era. In the grand prix mode, players compete against AI-controlled racers on a worldwide Grand Prix tour in order to become the champion, while up to two human players can compete on versus matches in the multiplayer mode by connecting two Neo Geo systems via LAN. Every race in the game is timed and if the players fails regain time by completing a lap, the game is over unless the player inserts more credits into the arcade machine to continue playing. If a memory card is present, players are allowed to save their progress during the single-player campaign at the protagonist's home and resume the last point the game was saved at.

In the role-playing single-player mode, players assume the role of an aspiring motorcycle racer on a quest to enter the Suzuka 8 Hours endurance race. Players travel over the map, meeting locals and facing small-time racers in order to earn money that can be spent on purchasing new bikes and upgrade their current bike, until enough money is collected to enter the endurance race and face the champion Diamond Dave. Both the grand prix and role-playing modes give a set number of turbo boosts to the players before each race that can be used to gain higher speeds and outrun opponents.

== Development and release ==
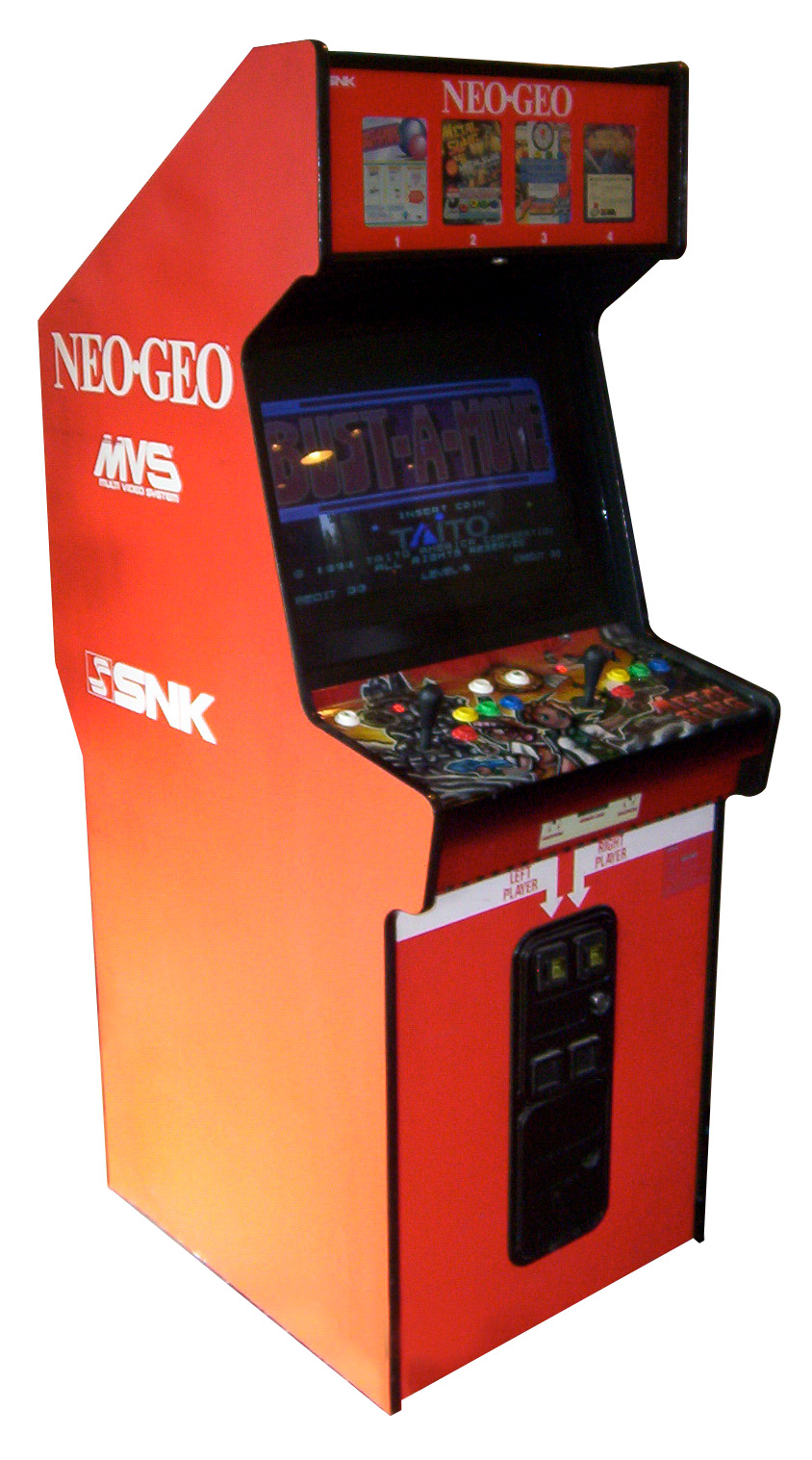
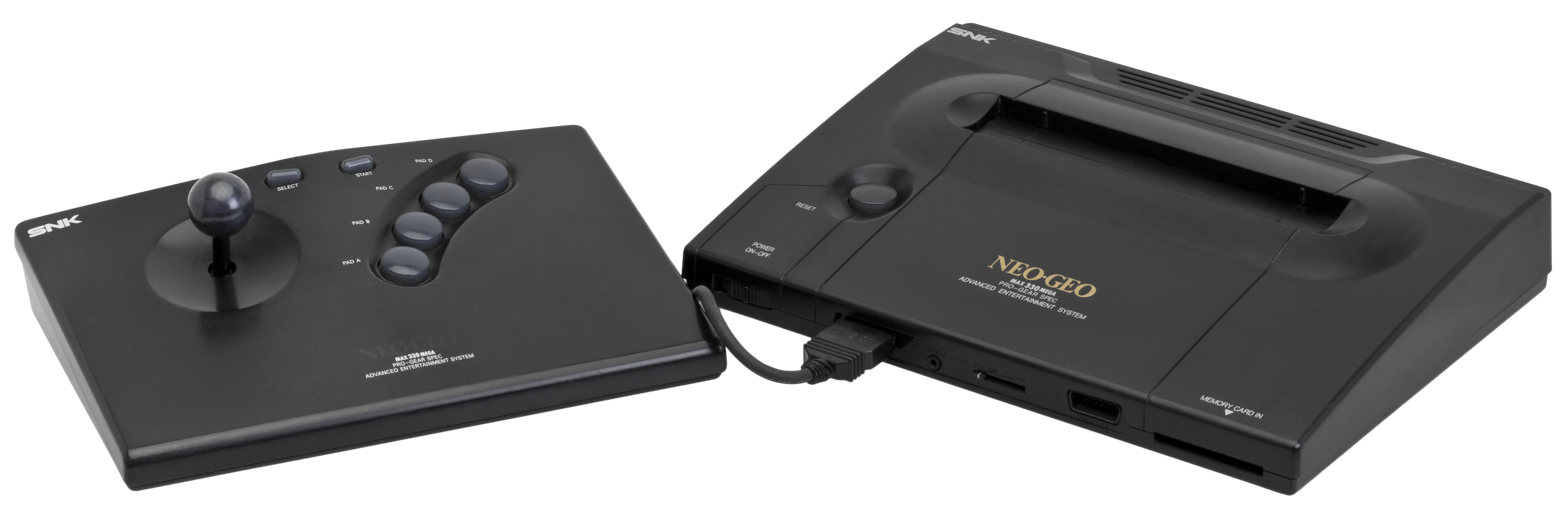
Riding Hero was the first title developed for the Neo Geo platform that featured multiplayer support via LAN play.

Riding Hero was initially first launched for arcades on July 24, 1990, becoming the first title in the Neo Geo library that featured "Multi Play" (Multi-Link) support that allowed two systems to be connected via a phone jack port integrated into each cartridge for LAN play. The game was then released for Neo Geo AES on July 1, 1991, and retained the LAN support for versus play. The title was later re-released for the Neo Geo CD on May 26, 1995, with minimal changes compared to the original MVS and AES versions minus the multiplayer mode. It has received a re-release in recent years on various digital distribution platforms such as the PlayStation Network, Nintendo eShop and Xbox Live by HAMSTER Corporation.

== Reception ==
Reviews (Neo Geo)

Review scores
Publication	Score
ACE	820/1000
AllGame	1.5/5 stars
Computer and Video Games	35%
GamePro	18/25
Joystick	82%
Mega Fun	60%
Player One	Average
Video Games (DE)	Average
Consolemania	68%
Leisure Line	9/10
Micom BASIC Magazine	3 stars

In North America, it was the top-grossing new video game on the RePlay arcade charts in November 1990. RePlay later reported Riding Hero to be the fifteenth most-popular arcade game in January 1991.

The game had some notable issues, the most common being how easy it was for the AI to put the player in a spin oftentimes unrecoverable. The vehicle movement was too predictable and bike itself ran choppy and the braking was weak.

Riding Hero was received with a mostly mixed reception from critics and reviewers since its original release.

== Legacy ==
Although Riding Hero never received a sequel or a spiritual successor of sorts, its LAN play feature would be re-used in SNK's own League Bowling and Alpha Denshi's Thrash Rally, the first of which allowed up to four or eight people for multiplayer.
