= Savage Reign =

1995 video game

- Developer: SNK
- Publisher: SNK
- Producers: Eikichi Kawasaki; Takashi Nishiyama
- Designers: H. Hamachi; Mitsuzo I. Yasuaki Uenoyama
- Programmers: Jaron; Magi2
- Artists: Ahokamen Boke; Econo Daisuke; March Kaji
- Composers: Yasuhiro Naka; Yoshihiko Kitamura
- Series: Fu'un
- Platforms: Arcade, Neo Geo AES, Neo Geo CD
- Release: Arcade: JP: April 25, 1995; NA: April 1995; Neo Geo AES: JP: May 26, 1995; NA: 1995; Neo Geo CD: JP: June 16, 1995; NA: October 1996
- Genre: Fighting
- Modes: Single-player, multiplayer
- Arcade system: Neo Geo MVS

Savage Reign (Note: Also known as Wind and Cloud Apocalypse: Hand-to-Hand Fighting Genesis (Japanese: 風雲黙示録 ～格闘創世～, Hepburn: Fū'un Mokushiroku: Kakutō Sōsei) in Japan.) is a 1995 fighting game developed and published by SNK for the Neo Geo arcade and home platforms. It was followed by Kizuna Encounter: Super Tag Battle in 1996. It was released along with its sequel in Japan as part of the Fūun Super Combo for the PlayStation 2; this compilation was re-released on the PlayStation Store for PlayStation 4 in December 2016.

== Plot ==
Savage Reign is set in the first half of the 21st century in the fictional city of South Town (the same city used in the Fatal Fury and Art of Fighting series), which has now been upgraded and renamed as Jipang City. A mysterious legendary fighter known only as King Leo has risen up from the shadows of secrecy and issued a challenge on television for the strongest of fighters to battle against him in a tournament known as the Battle of the Beast God, with the promises of immense wealth and legendary fame beyond imagination. Nine fighters have come to take part in this tournament, each with their own sole purpose and reason for battling against King Leo.

== Gameplay ==
Gameplay screenshot showcasing a match between Carol Stanzack and Sho Hayate.

The game, much like Samurai Shodown before it, places heavy emphasis on the user's weapon. However, Savage Reign has a few particular elements that make it stand out from its predecessor:

- The weapons can be thrown at an opponent from a distance for more ranged attacks. There are also two levels of playing field within the battles: The default lower one and the upper field, which both fighters jump to.
- The button layout is also slightly different, resembling World Heroes somewhat with a button for punching, a button for kicking, a button for the weapon and a button for jumping between planes. Holding down the punch or kick buttons results in a stronger attack.
- Much like Art of Fighting, the camera zooms in on the characters if they are in close proximity to each other and like Fatal Fury, the characters can fight each other using a two line battle system.

== Characters ==
- Sho Hayate: A young Japanese man who aims to prove the strength of Fu'un-Ken: a fighting style that combines martial arts with the mastery of the boomerang. Hayate is best known for his calm yet brash attitude while always initiating a strong battle cry in combat.
- Max Eagle: An undefeated pro wrestler who at first seems to just be interested in the challenge. However, he has a motive for entering: to see whether or not King Leo is actually his missing older brother. Eagle fights with a mixture of his axe and a couple of wrestling moves. The wrestling organization Eagle works for (known as the SWF) is the same one used in the SNK arcade game 3 Count Bout.
- Carol Stanzack: A beautiful French gymnast who is being forced to marry King Leo by her father and teacher, Jeanrick. Annoyed by this, Carol fights in order to break this commitment by using a combination of her acrobatic skills and a pink Olympic gymnast ball, as well as the use of aikido.
- Gordon Bowman: A large yet muscular police officer who carries an electric stun tonfa. His young daughter, Canbee is deathly ill and he's entered into the tournament in order to win the prize money so he can help support her medical attention.
- Chung Paifu: An old sennin who decides to enter the tournament due to a past conflict between him and King Leo. His cap was given to him by a man known only as the "Legendary Wolf". Chung fights with a wooden cane and is capable of instantly going into Ikari (Angry) Mode if his opponent knocks his cap off his head during battle.
- Gozu: A red-clad ninja who uses fire-based attacks with his Fire Claws. He is a member of a terrorist organization called the Jaguar (or Jäger) and (alongside his brother, Mezu) seeks revenge against King Leo for killing their brother, Kazuo.
- Mezu: A blue-clad ninja who uses water/ice-based attacks with his Ice Claws. Much like his older brother, Gozu, Mezu is a member of the Jaguar and is determined to avenge the death of their brother Kazuo, who was killed by King Leo in the past.
- Joker: A clown-like fighter who happens to be the leader of a violent street gang known as the Looly Po Po. Joker uses his unusual appearance and his strange weaponry (the primary one being a jack-in-the-box) as his fighting tools. His motivations for entering the tournament is to obtain glory for both himself and his gang. His real name is Marco Bariadrid.
- Nicola Zaza: A young Russian super genius who constructed both a Super Shield (which he utilizes like a flying disc in battle) and a Super Suit, Nicola participates in the tournament in order to test the very depths of his own creations.
- King Lion (Kage Shishioh): An unknown man that works for King Leo as his body double. Much like King Leo, King Lion wields the Sword of Leo and utilizes the same fighting style that King Leo has, although his is less powerful than his master's.
- King Leo (Shin Shishioh): The final boss and main antagonist of the series, King Leo is a legendary yet mysterious fighter responsible for creating and sponsoring the Battle of the Beast God tournament. A strong and ruthless warrior, King Leo wields the Sword of Leo and uses his minion, King Lion in order to test his opponent out before he comes out and battle them from within his lair.

== Reception ==
Reception

Review scores
Publication	Score
AllGame	(Neo Geo) 1.5/5
Next Generation	(Neo Geo) 2/5
Consoles +	(Neo Geo CD) 93%
The Electric Playground	(Neo Geo CD) 9 / 10
Hobby Consolas	(Neo Geo CD) 94 / 100
Joypad	(Neo Geo) 85%
MAN!AC	(Neo Geo) 74%
Maximum	(Neo Geo CD) 4/5
Mega Fun	(Neo Geo CD) 82%
Micromanía	(Neo Geo CD) 84 / 100
Player One	(Neo Geo) 60%
Super Game Power	(Neo Geo) 4.5 / 5.0
Superjuegos	(Neo Geo CD) 92 / 100
Última Generación	(Neo Geo CD) 72 / 100
Video Games	(Neo Geo CD) 78%
VideoGames	(Neo Geo) 7 / 10

In Japan, Game Machine listed Savage Reign on their 1 June 1995 issue as being the seventh most-successful arcade game of the month, outperforming titles such as Baku Baku Animal and Cyberbots.

Reviewing the Neo Geo home version, GamePro summarized, "Savage Reign is one of those impressive fighting games that's likely to disappear soon after it surfaces. It looks great and the sound is dynamite, but in the end it falls short because it lacks an identity to separate it from the multitude of fighting games already out there." The same GamePro critic reviewed the Neo Geo CD version with similar remarks, and noted that compared to the Neo Geo version "the three-button simultaneous attacks are more difficult to execute because the buttons are stacked on top of each other."

Next Generation reviewed the Neo-Geo version of the game, rating it two stars out of five, and stated that "The only innovative facet in Savage Reign is the upper level perch that shows up in each location in the form of a loft, rooftop, or just a cable to hang by. If you just can't get enough of these games, here's another."

Maximum gave the Neo Geo CD version four out of five stars, commenting that "Let there be no doubt, everything from the coin-op has been packed into the CD version making it a very attractive break from the more conventional Fatal Fury/King of Fighters activities, but with all the fighting action you'd expect from an SNK title."
