= Shinsetsu Samurai Spirits Bushidō Retsuden =

1997 video game

Shinsetsu Samurai Spirits: Bushidō Retsuden
- Developer: SNK (Note: Additional work by Asatsu and Fuji Television)
- Publisher: SNK
- Director: Choji Yoshikawa
- Producers: Chihiro Amano; Takashi Nishiyama; Yoshiro Kataoka
- Designer: Shirō Ono
- Programmers: M. Kondoh; T. Nakamura; T. Yamazaki
- Artists: Hitoshi Kanemaru; Keisuke Nozawa; Kimihiro Hasuo
- Writers: Katsuhiko Chiba; Tatsuji Yamazaki
- Composers: Akihiro Uchida; Hirotomi Imoto; Kyoko Naka
- Series: Samurai Shodown
- Platforms: Neo Geo CD; PlayStation; Sega Saturn
- Release: JP: June 26, 1997; Relaunch: JP: July 23, 1998
- Genre: Role-playing
- Mode: Single-player

Shinsetsu Samurai Spirits: Bushidō Retsuden (Note: Japanese: 真説 サムライ スピリッツ 武士道烈伝, Hepburn: Shinsetsu Samurai Supirittsu: Bushidō Retsuden; "Definitive Samurai Spirits: Tales of the Bushido") (Note: Also known as Samurai Shodown RPG and Samurai Spirits: True Legends of Furious Bushido RPG.) is a 1997 role-playing video game developed and published by SNK for the Neo Geo CD. It is a spin-off of the Samurai Shodown series. The game retells the events of Samurai Shodown and Samurai Shodown II in greater detail. The game was never released outside Japan. It was ported to the Sega Saturn and PlayStation.

The game is very similar to most console RPGs such as Dragon Quest and Final Fantasy.

The game received mixed reviews. It was praised for its graphics and detailed animation, but criticized for its long load times.

== Gameplay ==
A battle scene with Haohmaru facing two enemies. In this given moment, the player must choose a command for Haohmaru to perform.

The basic setup of the game is very similar to most console RPGs, such as Final Fantasy. The characters roam an overworld, enter towns and dungeons, and get into battles, which occur on a separate screen. The menu options enable equipping of armor and accessories, as well as use of items.

At the outset, the player is given the option to choose from six characters to be the "main" character of the story: Haohmaru, Nakoruru, Ukyo Tachibana, Genjuro Kibagami, Cham Cham, and Galford. D. Weller. The basic outline of the plot does not diverge greatly for any of them, but each has different dialogue ingame, and each also has unique special scenes which go into greater detail about the character. In addition, to better adjust to character continuity, certain stories are modified slightly based on the selected chapter. Over the course of the game, two other characters can also join the party (unless the hero is Genjuro, who only gains a partner in his second story). In addition, the second chapter also introduces a new character, Shippuu no Reon (疾風の鈴音), whose name translates roughly to "The Ringing of the Gale Winds." All characters from the first two Samurai Shodown games make an appearance, either as a temporary helper, plot device, or enemy.

Combat includes an option to input the joystick motions for the various special moves manually, as in the arcade games, rather than simply selecting the moves from a list.

While armor and accessories can be bought and equipped, each character has the same weapon throughout the game. Characters can visit blacksmiths to temper and strengthen their weapons. These smiths can also infuse the weapons with one of the game's various elements, which make the weapon's normal strikes and select special moves more effective against certain enemies.

== Development ==
The development history of the game is fairly storied. It was announced for development in 1995, and underwent many delays in the process, finally being released a few years later. For some time, rumors abounded that it was never going to come out. A U.S. release was planned for the third quarter of 1997 (just a few months after the Japanese release), but it never materialized.

As originally envisioned, the game was to be split into three episodes: one for each of the three games in the series. For a while, it was to be a Neo Geo CD exclusive, but developmental and financial pressures caused SNK to also release it for two other current systems. SNK decided that each version was to contain only two of the three episodes, thereby necessitating a player to buy two copies of the game in order to get the whole story. This plan resulted in a significant backlash from fans, and was discarded.

Eventually, as development ground on, the executive decision was made to scrap the third chapter entirely, and focus solely on the first two, so as to allow the game to be released sooner.

== Release ==
While the core gameplay is largely similar between the versions, there are aesthetic and gameplay differences between the Neo Geo CD and PlayStation/Saturn versions.

- The Neo Geo CD version has considerably more animation in the combat sprites than the PS and Saturn, including unique idle stances for each character and specialized death animations for monsters.
- The Neo Geo CD version has more ornate and colorful menus, whereas the PS and Saturn versions have fairly blank, purple-and-green menus instead.
- Motions in the Neo Geo CD version have a smoother look and feel than the others.
- In the overworld map, the NeoCD version uses a scaled-down version of the dungeon/down character sprite. The PS version uses a new sprite entirely.
- The Neo Geo CD runs in its native resolution of 304x224, whereas the PS and Saturn run in 320x240.
- The Neo Geo CD version has fewer pauses between audio clips than the others.
- The PS and Saturn version have significant animation cuts in the characters' walk/run animations.
- The PS version enables the player to select the strength of a normal attack after choosing a target, whereas the Neo Geo CD does not.
- The PS version shows an Active Time Battle bar, which the NeoCD lacks.
- The PS version has higher-quality music than either of the other two versions, owing to higher-quality PCM samples.

The most obvious differences between the three versions are the bonus modes which are unlocked after beating the game.

- Neo Geo CD: A third "mini-chapter" is enabled, wherein the player controls Hisame Shizumaru as he wanders around, running into cameo appearances of various SNK characters from other games.
- PlayStation: A "side story" mode is enabled, which enables the player to view non-interactive sequences about many of the series' other characters.
- Saturn: An interview mode is enabled, which enables the player to view a lengthy, non-interactive sequence about the various characters, frequently breaking the fourth wall. This bonus content is also available in the PlayStation version, by way of a hacked save file.

== Reception ==
Reception

Review score
| Publication | Score |
|---|---|
| Dengeki PlayStation | 55/100, 85/100 |

According to Famitsu, Shinsetsu Samurai Spirits: Bushidō Retsuden on Neo Geo CD sold over 20,256 copies in its first week on the market. Famitsu also reported that both the PlayStation and Sega Saturn versions sold over 37,353 and 28,122 copies, respectively, in their first week on the market as well.

In 2014, HobbyConsolas identified Shinsetsu Samurai Spirits: Bushidō Retsuden as one of the twenty best games for the Neo Geo CD.
