= Ragnagard =

1996 video game

- Developer: Saurus (Note: Additional work by System Vision)
- Publisher: SNK: Saurus (Neo Geo CD)
- Director: Ryōmi Momota
- Producer: Nobuyuki Tanaka
- Designer: Hiroaki Fujimoto
- Programmer: Hideki Suzuki
- Artists: Kyoosuke Motoya; Motohiro Toshiro; Ryōmi Momota
- Composer: Hideki Suzuki
- Platforms: Arcade, Neo Geo AES, Neo Geo CD, Sega Saturn
- Release: Arcade: JP: June 13, 1996; Neo Geo AES: JP: July 26, 1996; Neo Geo CD: JP: August 23, 1996; Saturn: JP: April 4, 1997
- Genre: Fighting
- Modes: Single-player, multiplayer
- Arcade system: Neo Geo MVS

Ragnagard (Note: Also known as Shinouken (Japanese: 神凰拳, Hepburn: Shin'ōken; lit. "God Phoenix Fist") in Japan.) is a 1996 fighting game developed by Saurus and published by SNK for the Neo Geo arcade and home platforms. It was ported to the Neo Geo CD and Sega Saturn. The game's characters are all based on Shinto deities.

== Gameplay ==
Gameplay screenshot showcasing a match between Susano and Benten.

Ragnagard is a fighting game using pre-rendered sprites similar to that of Rare's Killer Instinct but with different gameplay mechanics. The game features an Aerial Battle System which is done by pushing up on the joystick and both of the weak punch and weak kick buttons together, allowing for air combos and air dashing. Players can also charge up the power gauge (based on four elements of Water, Wind, Fire, and Thunder, though each character only uses two of the four elements) which allows for Desperation Moves to be performed. Super Desperation Moves can be performed only if the player's life is flashing red, similar to The King of Fighters series.

== Ports and related releases ==
Ragnagard was later ported to the Neo-Geo AES, the home console version of the Neo-Geo MVS. This version features limited continues and different difficulty settings. This version was re-released through the Wii Virtual Console exclusively in Japan. Ragnagard was also ported to the Neo-Geo CD exclusively in Japan; this version features an improved intro, slightly cleaner background music, and a few other tweaks. This version of Ragnagard was later ported to the Sega Saturn, also exclusively in Japan. This version features a few new modes and control customization, while some of the game's graphics and gameplay were improved and altered. Unlike the arcade and Neo-Geo versions, in which the player can play as one of the bosses by entering a cheat code, the Neo-Geo CD and Sega Saturn versions allow the player to play as the bosses only by entering the versus mode. Hamster Corporation re-released the game as part of their ACA Neo Geo series for the PlayStation 4, Xbox One, Nintendo Switch, Windows, Android and iOS.

== Reception ==
Reception

Review scores
Publication	Score
AllGame	2.5/5 (ARC)
Electronic Gaming Monthly	4.675/10 (NG)
Famitsu	63/100 (SS)
M! Games	75% (SS)
Player One	78% (NGCD)

Ragnagard received generally mixed reception from critics since its release.

Of Electronic Gaming Monthly's four reviewers, Crispin Boyer had a subdued reaction, but the other three panned the game. Shawn Smith and Sushi-X found it boring due to the characters' choppy movements and the lag time between each move, and Dan Hsu and Sushi-X remarked that while the pre-fight animations are impressive, the graphics are undistinguished once the fight starts. MAN!AC's Robert Bannert commended the character designs but felt overall mixed about Ragnagard when reviewing the Saturn conversion in regards to several design aspects. Player One's Christophe Delpierre compared the visual style of the game with Killer Instinct.

In a retrospective review for AllGame, Kyle Knight felt mixed in regard to the pre-rendered visual presentation and audio design but criticized the balance issues with characters and gameplay.
