= Cyber-Lip =

1990 video game

- Developer: SNK
- Publisher: SNK
- Director: Deru-Deru
- Producer: Eikichi Kawasaki
- Designer: Higashi Pon
- Programmer: Sho Chan
- Composer: Yasuo Yamate
- Platforms: Arcade, Neo Geo AES, Neo Geo CD
- Release: Arcade: WW: November 7, 1990; Neo Geo AES: WW: July 1, 1991; Neo Geo CD: JP: April 21, 1995; NA: October 1996
- Genre: Run and gun
- Modes: Single-player, multiplayer
- Arcade system: Neo Geo MVS

Cyber-Lip (Note: Japanese: サイバー・リップ, Hepburn: Saibā-Rippu) is a 1990 run and gun video game developed and published by SNK for the Neo Geo arcade and home platforms. Hamster Corporation re-released the game as part of their ACA Neo Geo series for the PlayStation 4, Xbox One, Nintendo Switch, Windows, Android and iOS.

== Gameplay ==
The first boss

Gameplay consists of battling through large numbers of enemies, collecting power-ups and defeating several end-of-stage bosses. In addition to the normal gun, the player can gain and use other weapons such as flamethrowers and rocket launchers. However ammunition is limited and players can switch weapons to conserve ammo. Bosses require the player to shoot their weak spots repeatedly. In between stages the player has to choose whether to ascend or descend in an elevator which will randomly determine if the player will proceed to the next stage. If the player picks the wrong elevator button, the player will have to traverse through a dangerous sub-level before proceeding to the next stage. After passing stages one till six, the player will be faced with a computer room with eight doors, which randomly determine which of the previous six bosses the player will face, the final ammunition room or the chance to face Cyber-Lip itself.

== Plot ==
In the year 2016 the federal government approved a space colony project in response to global overpopulation. By 2019, the Colony CO5 was the stronghold for androids. However many androids were found to be defective. The next year, the government had a supercomputer called Cyber-Lip built to control the androids. The androids were trained to combat an incoming alien invasion. Now the year is 2030 and humankind is in jeopardy from the alien and maverick android forces combined. Two of the military's best veteran androids Rick and Brook have been sent as a last-ditch effort to repel the invaders and destroy the evilly reprogrammed Cyber-Lip.

== Development and release ==
The game was ported over to the Neo Geo CD system in 1995. The CD version features improved voice acting and added a short introduction to the game explaining the plot.

== Reception ==
Reviews (Neo Geo)

Review scores
| Publication | Score |
|---|---|
| AllGame | 1.5/5 |
| Consoles + | 67% |
| GameFan | 291/400 |
| Joystick | 82% |
| Player One | 74% |
| Superjuegos | 70.4% |
| Tilt | 15/20 |
| ACE | 765/1000 |
| CVG Mean Machines | 31% |
| Génération 4 | 72% |

In Japan, Game Machine listed Cyber-Lip on their December 15, 1990 issue as being the fourth most-popular arcade game at the time. In North America, it was the top-grossing new video game on the RePlay arcade charts in December 1990. RePlay later reported the game to be the sixth most-popular arcade game in January 1991. The title was met with mixed critical reception from reviewers since its initial release in arcades and later on Neo Geo AES.

AllGame's Kyle Knight regarded Cyber-Lip as an inferior Contra clone, criticizing the inability to shoot diagonally or down when jumping but commended the hand-drawn graphics and praised the audio design. Consoles Plus's F. Orlans and J.B. Aerstut, as well as Player One's Cyril Drevet, commended the animated sequences, audiovisual presentation, orchestra-like soundtrack and playability but the former publication criticized the presence of unlimited continues, stating that the feature lowered interest in the game. Likewise, GameFan's four reviewers gave positive remarks to the character animations, audio and boss fights but unanimously criticized its short length.

French magazine Joystick commented in a positive light in regards to the visuals and two-player mode, as well as the ability to save progress via memory card. Both Superjuegos' Alberto Pascual and Tilt's François Hermelin, as well as Génération 4's Jean Delaite, praised the audiovisual presentation and animations but Pascual felt mixed in regards to the difficulty and originality on display. ACE's David Upchurch also commended the presentation and enjoyable gameplay but regarded this area as unoriginal and mindless. Computer and Video Games Mean Machines noted its high difficulty but felt unimpressed, criticizing the lack of originality and gameplay for being dull.

In 2014, HobbyConsolas identified Cyber-Lip as one of the twenty best games for the Neo Geo CD.
