= Kizuna Encounter: Super Tag Battle =

1996 video game

- Arcade flyer by Shinkiro
- Developer: SNK
- Publisher: SNK
- Directors: Kanbei Hama; Mitsuzo I.
- Producers: Akira Goto; Hiroshi Matsumoto; Takashi Nishiyama
- Programmers: Bashi; Jaron
- Artists: Akairo Megane; G. Ishidaman; Nishi Futatsu
- Writer: Hidetaka Suehiro
- Composers: Mitsuo; Yasuo Yamate; Yoshihiko Kitamura
- Platforms: Arcade, Neo Geo AES Windows
- Release: Arcade: JP: September 20, 1996; NA: 1996; Neo Geo AES: NA/JP: November 8, 1996; 4Way Battle Version; Windows: WW: October 11, 2025
- Genre: Fighting
- Modes: Single-player, multiplayer
- Arcade system: Neo Geo MVS

Kizuna Encounter: Super Tag Battle (Note: Also known as Fū'un Super Tag Battle (Japanese: 風雲スーパータッグバトル, Hepburn: Fū'un Sūpā Taggu Batoru; lit. "Wind and Cloud Super Tag Battle") in Japan.) is a 1996 fighting game developed and published by SNK for the Neo Geo arcade and home platforms. It is the sequel to Savage Reign. The European Neo Geo home cartridge PAL release is relatively rare, with only five known copies, making it a sought-after item in video game collecting. It is the first game with involvement from Hidetaka Suehiro, who wrote the scenario for the game and would become a reputable video game designer.

Like its predecessor, it was ported to PlayStation 2 (released in Japan only). This compilation was re-released in the PlayStation Store for PlayStation 4 in December 2016. The Neo Geo version was released for the Wii Virtual Console in Japan on June 28, 2011. Hamster Corporation re-released the game as part of their ACA Neo Geo series for the PlayStation 4, Xbox One, Nintendo Switch, Windows, Android and iOS.

On October 11, 2025, the game was released for Windows as part of the Neo Geo Premium Selection series, based on the previously unreleased Kizuna Encounter: Super Tag Battle "4Way Battle Version". This version features 4 players and online play with rollback netcode by Code Mystics.

== Gameplay ==
Gameplay screenshot showcasing a match between Rosa and Sho Hayate against Max Eagle and Chung Paifu.

The Kizuna Encounter fighting system is similar to the Real Bout Fatal Fury fighting system. Notable additions include the tag system, in which players have the ability to switch characters in-game by pressing the tag button while standing in their team's tag area. If a player loses one character, regardless of their other character's vitality, they lose the match. A roll system similar to the one used in The King of Fighters is also present in Kizuna Encounter as well.

== Plot ==
One year ago, King Leo made and held the Battle of the Beast God tournament in order to see who was worthy enough to challenge him. Nine fighters entered the tournament upon sight and each of them battled against one another, but in the end, Sho Hayate proved to be the strongest warrior and he won the tournament while defeating both King Leo and his fake impersonator King Lion in the finals of the competition.

To seek revenge against Hayate and those who caused his downfall, King Leo has organized a second version of the Battle of the Beast God tournament, but with a new rule: teams of two people must work together in this new tournament so that they can either ensure victory or face defeat. The competitors from last year's tournament have learned of King Leo's new tournament and have decided to join forces with each other on either friendly or temporary terms, with the exception of Carol Stanzack (who decides to skip the tournament in order to continue her gymnastics training) and Nicola Zaza (who's too busy with work on his latest scientific project). However, the previous fighters aren't the only ones from within this tournament, as two new challengers have entered into the fray as well. The gathered fighters must be prepared to not only fight against each other, but against King Leo in this tournament, as well as an unknown threat lurking in the shadows.

== Characters ==
=== Returning characters ===
- Sho Hayate
- Max Eagle
- Gordon Bowman
- Chung Paifu
- Gozu
- Mezu
- Joker
- King Lion

=== New characters ===
- Rosa - A young woman who wields a sword in combat and leads a strong resistance force against King Leo. When her young brother and a couple of her friends are kidnapped by King Leo, Rosa heads to the tournament in the hopes of defeating King Leo and saving her comrades.
- Kim Sue Il - A young Korean police detective who uses taekwondo and wields a bo staff. He is investigating Joker's involvement in the tournament and seeks to not only arrest him, but also to disband his gang, the Looly Po Po. It is heavily implied that Sue Il is a descendant of Kim Kaphwan from the Fatal Fury and The King of Fighters series (sharing some of his ancestor's traits, specifically a strong sense of justice, similar appearance, and many fighting skills and techniques). His name is translated as "Kim Young-Mok" in the game.

=== Bosses ===
- King Leo (Sub-Boss)
- Jyazu (Final Boss) - A mysterious fighter with a golden crow helmet known for his cruelty and sadism. Jyazu dresses in a black variant of Gozu and Mezu's attire and fights using a pair of golden claws while also utilizing some of Gozu and Mezu's own moves. As the leader of the terrorist organization the Jaguar (to which Gozu and Mezu are members of it), Jyazu's background is shrouded in mystery and his intentions are unknown. He can also transform into a demonic humanoid crow at will and can mask his evil intent from his enemies, giving him an unfair advantage.

== See also ==
- Savage Reign
