= Football Frenzy =

1992 video game

- Developer: SNK
- Publisher: SNK
- Producer: Eikichi Kawasaki
- Designer: Tomomi M.
- Programmers: Data Tada; Makoto; Masami
- Artists: Mina Kawai; Nishi Futatsub; Tami Sugiura
- Composers: Yasuo Yamate; Yoshihiko Kitamura
- Platforms: Arcade, Neo Geo AES, Neo Geo CD
- Release: Arcade: WW: January 31, 1992; Neo Geo AES: WW: February 21, 1992; Neo Geo CD: JP: September 9, 1994; NA: October 1996
- Genre: Sports
- Modes: Single-player, multiplayer
- Arcade system: Neo Geo MVS

Football Frenzy (Note: Japanese: フットボール・フレンジー, Hepburn: Futtobōru Furenjī) is a 1992 American football video game developed and published by SNK for the Neo Geo arcade and home platforms. It was the second football game created by SNK after 1987's Touchdown Fever, as well as the only football game released for the Neo Geo platform.

In the game, players have the choice to compete in matches against either AI-controlled opponents or other human players. It was re-released through download services for various consoles. Football Frenzy has been met with mixed reception from critics since its initial launch, with some praising its presentation, visuals and sound design, while others criticized the gameplay for being difficult to grasp.

== Gameplay ==
Gameplay screenshot

Football Frenzy is an American football game similar to Touch Down Fever and other similar golf titles from the era, where players compete in matches against either AI-controlled opponents on a single-player tournament mode or against other human players in a two-player versus mode. Most of the rules from the sport are present in the title, following the same basic gameplay featured in other football simulators including the ability of tackling players and lob the oval-shaped football into the goalpost, though the game provides a faster pace and a more arcade-style approach of the sport instead. When playing solo, players compete against seven rival teams by choosing any of the ten selectable teams in order to become champion of the season. Due to the lack of an NFL license, all of the teams featured are fictional. If a memory card is present, the players are allowed to save their progress and resume into the last match the game saved at.

== Release ==
Football Frenzy was initially first launched for arcades on January 31, 1992, becoming the only football title released on Neo Geo by SNK. The game was then released for Neo Geo AES during the same time period a month later. The title was later re-released for the Neo Geo CD on September 9, 1994 as one of the launch titles for the system, with minimal changes compared to the original MVS and AES versions. Hamster Corporation re-released the game as part of their ACA Neo Geo series for the PlayStation 4, Xbox One, Nintendo Switch, Windows, Android and iOS. It was also recently included in the international version of the Neo Geo mini.

== Reception ==
Reception

Review scores
Publication	Score
AllGame	(Neo Geo)
GamePro	(Neo Geo) 13 / 20
Consolemania	(Neo Geo) 83 / 100
Consoles +	(Neo Geo) 92%
Hobby Consolas	(Neo Geo) 85 / 100
Hobby Hi-Tech	(Neo Geo CD) 5 / 10
Joypad	(Neo Geo) 90%
Joystick	(Neo Geo) 86%
Mega Fun	(Neo Geo) 74%
Micom BASIC Magazine	(Neo Geo)
Neo Geo Freak	(Arcade) 9 / 20
Player One	(Neo Geo) 84%

In Japan, Game Machine listed Football Frenzy as the fourth most successful table arcade unit of March 1992, outperforming titles such as Captain Commando. The game has been met with mixed reception from critics since its initial launch.
