= Gururin =

1994 video game

- Developer: Face
- Publisher: SNK
- Producer: Kenichi Iwanaga
- Designer: Kingo Hiraku
- Programmers: Kaori Hijiya; Noriyuki Tabata
- Artists: Kenichi Kumakura; Masako Araki; Michiyo Morohoshi
- Composers: Atsuko Iwanaga; Kenji Sugai
- Platform: Arcade
- Release: WW: May 25, 1994
- Genre: Puzzle
- Modes: Single-player; Multiplayer
- Arcade system: Neo Geo MVS

Gururin (Note: Japanese: ぐるりん) is a 1994 tile-matching puzzle video game developed by Face and published by SNK for the Neo Geo arcade platform. A conversion for the Neo Geo CD was planned and even previewed but it did not receive an official release to the public. In the game, players must match 3 people with their respective colored outfit, while rotating the playfield in order to rearrange them.

Gururin has garnered mixed critical reception since its original release in arcades from reviewers who felt mixed towards several aspects of the game such as the visuals, sound design and gameplay, while its difficulty and learning curve has been heavily criticized.

Hamster Corporation re-released the game as part of their ACA Neo Geo series for the PlayStation 4, Xbox One, Nintendo Switch and Windows.

== Gameplay ==
Gameplay screenshot.

Gururin is a tile-matching puzzle game reminiscent of Columns and Puyo Puyo, where the player must match 3 people wearing the same color outfit vertically or horizontally in order to become warriors as the main objective. In addition to the single-player mode, the game also features a competitive two-player mode where one human competes against either computer-controlled opponents or against other human players in versus matches to become the winner. If a memory card is present, the players are allowed to save their high-score.

A unique feature of the game is the rotation of people around the playfield; By pressing A or B, players rotate the arena either to the left or the right, changing the positioning of people. On occasions, an arrow appears indicating the correct way to match 3 people of the same color. However, people can also potentially grab their hands to not let themselves go, making puzzle solving more complex and later levels increase in difficulty as well. If the people manages to occupy the playfield, the game is over unless players insert more credits into the arcade machine to continue playing.

== Development and release ==
Gururin served as the first project to be developed by Face for the Neo Geo platform and its creation was helmed by producer Kenichi Iwanaga. Iwanaga was also both its designer and programmer along with Kaori Hijiya, Kingo Hiraku and Noriyuki Tabata. Artists Masako Araki, Michiyo Morohoshi and Kenichi Kumakura were responsible for the pixel art, while Atsuko Iwanaga and Kenji Sugai were in charge of its sound design, among other people collaborating in its development.

Gururin was initially only launched for the arcades by SNK on May 25, 1994. A Neo Geo CD version was announced and even showcased for playing to the attendees at SNK's booth during the Winter Consumer Electronics Show in 1995 but it was never released for unknown reasons. The game has since received a re-release in 2018 on various modern platforms such as the Nintendo Switch, PlayStation 4, Xbox One and Microsoft Windows as part of the ACA Neo Geo series by Hamster Corporation.

== Reception ==
Reception

Aggregate score
Aggregator	Score
GameRankings	(Switch) 50%

Review scores
Publication	Score
AllGame	(Neo Geo) 3.5/5
Nintendo Life	(Switch) 5 / 10
Cubed3	(Switch) 5 / 10

Gururin has been met mixed reception from critics since its initial release. AllGame's Kyle Knight criticized the visuals, sound design, difficulty and learning curve but praised the addictive gameplay and rotating mechanic. In a retrospective review, Gonçalo Lopes from Nintendo Life regarded the graphics and music for being surreal and psychedelic, despite being standard for the genre but criticized for being complicated for players, recommending other titles on the Neo Geo such as Puzzled, Magical Drop and Puzzle Bobble. In another retrospective review, Gabriel Jones of Cubed3 criticized its level of complexity and learning curve, stating that it was a stark contrast to the "pick up and play" philosophy of other arcade titles.
