= Touchdown Fever =

1987 video game

- North American arcade flyer
- Developer: SNK
- Publishers: Arcade: JP/NA: SNK; Famicom/NES: JP: K. Amusement Leasing; NA: SNK
- Platforms: Arcade, Nintendo Entertainment System
- Release: Arcade: JP: August 1987; NA: October 1987; Famicom/NES: JP: November 11, 1988; NA: February 1991
- Genre: Sports
- Modes: Single-player, multiplayer

Touchdown Fever (Note: Japanese: タッチダウンフィーバー, Hepburn: Tacchidaun Fībā) is a 1987 American football video game developed and published by SNK for arcades. It was later ported to the Nintendo Entertainment System and was released in Japan by K. Amusement Leasing on November 11, 1988 and in North America by SNK in February 1991. A sequel, Touchdown Fever II, was released in 1988.

Hamster Corporation released the game as part of their Arcade Archives series for the Nintendo Switch and PlayStation 4, as well as their Arcade Archives 2 series for the PlayStation 5 and Xbox Series X/S in January 2026.

== Gameplay ==
At first glance, it resembles Irem's 1983 arcade game 10-Yard Fight, but with rotating joysticks that were previously used in SNK's Ikari Warriors. Most of the official rules are in effect as well as most major running and passing plays. Field goals and punts are also included, but, players cannot make horse collar tackles.

== NES Version ==
This version featured teams that originated from cities that had NFL teams at the time (such as Seattle and Phoenix) but not the colors or the nicknames as the game was not officially licensed by the NFL. Graphics were toned down as they were for many arcade games ported to the system. The human players could only select five basic plays: Long Pass, Short Pass, QB Sneak, Backs (a hand-off) or Punt/Field Goal (Field Goals could only be attempted if the line of scrimmage was within the 15-yard line). Field Goals would always go through the uprights unless blocked by the opposing team. Despite the NFL not adopting this rule until the 1994 season, a player could attempt a 2-point conversion if so desired.

== Reception ==
In Japan, Game Machine listed Touchdown Fever as the 17th most successful table arcade unit of October 1987.

== See also ==
- Football Frenzy
