= Ghost Pilots =

1991 video game

- Developer: SNK
- Publisher: SNK
- Director: Takashi Nishiyama
- Producer: Eikichi Kawasaki
- Designers: M. Mioshi; N. Mori; R. Miyazaki
- Composer: Masahiko Hataya
- Platforms: Arcade, Neo Geo AES, Neo Geo CD
- Release: Arcade: WW: January 25, 1991; Neo Geo AES: WW: July 1, 1991; Neo Geo CD: JP: March 17, 1995; NA: October 1996
- Genre: Scrolling shooter
- Modes: Single-player, multiplayer
- Arcade system: Neo Geo MVS

Ghost Pilots (Note: Japanese: ゴースト・パイロット, Hepburn: Gōsuto Pairotto) is a 1991 vertically scrolling shooter video game developed and published by SNK for the Neo Geo arcade and home platforms. It has elements similar to Capcom's 194X series, but the player controls a seaplane.

== Plot ==
In World War II, an ambitious Nazi general sends his forces against the Allies. Two freelance ace pilots Tom Phillips and Charlie Stingley nicknamed "Ghost Pilots", set off in their seaplanes to combat the Axis forces head on.

== Gameplay ==
Gameplay screenshot

Before starting a stage, the player must choose one of two bomb types. In one of the two stages after the first, the player also has the option to choose a third unique bomb type (napalm bomb in the land strike stage and air mines in the air strike stage). At the start of the game a player starts with three bombs and can collect up to a maximum of nine bombs. In a two-player game, both players cannot choose the same bomb type.

During a stage, the player can maneuver the seaplane around the area, fire bullets and launch the chosen bombs in limited quantity. Enemies consist of tanks, gunboats, jets and a number of other units. Shooting a row of red planes grants collectible power-ups for stronger and widespread firepower, additional bombs and extra lives. Certain medium-sized enemies destroyed grant collectible bonus stars for additional score. The player loses a life if the seaplane is hit by a bullet or crashes into an enemy.

The first stage is in two parts which means there is no checkpoint in between. When the player reaches a checkpoint, the overall score is boosted. After the first stage the player can choose to do either the land strike stage or the air strike stage next. The land strike stage consists of mostly sea and land units while the air strike stage consists of a majority of air units. If the player makes it past both stages, the last stage is in two parts. Throughout the game's stages, the player must destroy bosses by shooting their weak points multiple times.

== Reception ==
Reception

Aggregate score
Aggregator	Score
GameRankings	(NS) 60%

Review scores
Publication	Score
AllGame	(AC) 2/5 (NG) 1.5/5
Consoles +	(NG) 88%
Computer and Video Games	(NG) 68/100
Famitsu	(NG) 24/40
GamePro	(NG) 25/25
HobbyConsolas	(NG) 89/100
Joystick	(NG) 72%
Nintendo Life	(NS) 6/10
Player One	(NG) 93%
Superjuegos	(NG) 80,8/100
Génération 4	(NG) 84%
Última Generación	(NGCD) 72/100
Ultimate Future Games	(NGCD) 59%

In Japan, Game Machine listed Ghost Pilots on their April 15, 1991 issue as being the seventeenth most-popular arcade game at the time. Likewise, RePlay reported the game to be the tenth most-popular arcade game at the time. The title was met with mixed to positive reception from critics since its release in arcades. It holds a 60% on the video game review aggregator GameRankings.

AllGame's Paul Biondich and Kyle Knight compared Ghost Pilots with 1942 and 1941: Counter Attack, regarding it as a rip-off and criticized the sluggish controls, lack of enemy variety and uninteresing power-up system. Consoles Plus' Kaneda Kun and François Hermelin praised the graphics, sound design and playability but felt mixed in regards to the presentation and criticized the presence of unlimited continues. Computer and Video Games' Frank O'Connor also compared the game with Flying Shark, criticizing its design and programming, regarding it to be an average but mediocre vertical-scrolling shoot 'em up. Famitsu's four reviewers scored the Neo Geo version a 24 out of 40. In contrast, GamePro's Rigor Mortis gave high remarks to the pseudo-3D visual design, sound, cooperative two-player mode and lack of slowdown during gameplay.

In a similar manner as Biondich and Knight, Hobby Consolas' Manuel del Campo also compared Ghost Pilots with 1942. del Campo praised the graphics, sound design and playability but criticized its short length. Likewise, both Génération 4's Frank Ladoire and Joystick' Jean-Marc Demoly commended the game's animated visuals, controls, sound and playability. Player One's Cyril Drevet drew comparison with 1941: Counter Attack and Flying Shark as well but gave positive remarks to the visuals, animations, sound and longevity but criticized its low difficulty level. Superjuegos' Alberto Pascual noted that its difficulty level was high and praised the audiovisual presentation but felt mixed about the originality on-display. Última Generación's Javier S. Fernández reviewed the Neo Geo CD version, stating that it embodied the spirit of older overhead shoot 'em ups but criticized the presence of unlimited continues, a sentiment shared by Kun and Hermelin. Ultimate Future Games also reviewed the Neo Geo CD version but stated it was not as fun as Viewpoint, criticizing its slow pace.

Ghost Pilots has been met with mixed reception from retrospective reviewers in recent years. Nintendo Life's Gonçalo Lopez commended the Nintendo Switch port for being a solid port, praising the visuals and sound design but criticized its lack of balance.
