= The Super Spy =

1990 video game

- Developer: SNK
- Publisher: SNK
- Director: Eikichi Kawasaki
- Producer: Kazuhiro Nishida
- Designers: Akira Goto; Hideki Fujiwara; Takeshi Kimura
- Composer: Masahiko Hataya
- Platforms: Arcade, Neo Geo AES, Neo Geo CD
- Release: Arcade: JP: October 8, 1990; Neo Geo AES: NA/JP: July 1, 1991; Neo Geo CD: JP: September 9, 1994; NA: October 1996
- Genre: Action role-playing
- Modes: Single-player, multiplayer
- Arcade system: Neo Geo MVS

The Super Spy (Note: Japanese: ザ・スーパー・スパイ, Hepburn: Za Sūpā Supai) is a 1990 action role-playing video game developed and published by SNK for the Neo Geo arcade and home platforms. It contains first-person shooter and beat 'em up elements as players move through the many floors of an office building shooting terrorists. It is a first-person game where the player character's arms and weapons are visible on screen.

== Plot ==
The plot revolves around a CIA agent, named Roy Heart, who needs to traverse office buildings, and warehouses to stop a group of terrorists, known as the Zolge King terrorist group, led by a man named King (who bears a slight resemblance to Geese Howard in his business suit from the Fatal Fury and The King of Fighters franchises, both also by SNK). The group is responsible for the horrible murders of thousands caused by destroying the subways with bombs. As Mr. Heart, the player hunts through the terrorists' bomb factory for those responsible.

== Gameplay ==
Gameplay screenshot

Movement in the game is done by mainly strafing and only moving forwards or backwards in corridors. Additional moves include ducking, sidestepping and blocking. The player can only progress after all enemies in sight are cleared. Occasionally, the player can move forward into rooms to save hostages or ambush a boss or other enemies. Saving hostages will grant the player healing items, chances to repair or upgrade his weaponry, or random moments of exposition. Eliminating enemies grants the player experience points used to raise a level, granting more power in attacks.

Much of the close combat system resembles Mike Tyson's Punch-Out!!. The player's attack variety consists of four types. Punching (which can be upgraded with brass knuckles) includes some special moves: strong punches and stunning right hook punches. Kicking includes knee smashes. The combat knife is sturdier but loses power and gets rusty the more it is used. The pistol has limited ammo and no recharges but can be used to pistol-whip to conserve shots. Finally from certain hostages the player can gain a submachine gun which has a wider range than the pistol. Firearms can also be used to blow up various explosive materials in the background against enemies.

Enemies consist mainly of palette-swapped ski-masked men, ninjas and gunmen who get stronger as the player progresses through the levels. There are occasional sub-bosses including engineers, scientists and strongmen. To finish the game, both bosses in the first mission must be eliminated and all six in the second mission.

== Reception ==
Reception

Aggregate score
Aggregator	Score
GameRankings	(Switch) 40%

Review scores
Publication	Score
Nintendo Life	(Switch) 4 / 10
AllGame	(Neo Geo)
CVG Mean Machines	(Neo Geo) 39%
GamePro	(Neo Geo) 20 / 25
Hobby Hi-Tech	(Neo Geo CD) 6 / 10
Mega Fun	(Neo Geo) 73%
Micom BASIC Magazine	(Neo Geo)
Raze	(Neo Geo) 83%

The game has been received with an overall mixed reception from critics since its initial release. Dave Frear of Nintendo Life described the game as a “repetitive trudge” and “impressive looking … considering its 1990 release date ”.

In Japan, Game Machine listed The Super Spy on their December 15, 1990 issue as being the fifth most-successful table arcade unit of the month, outperforming titles such as Columns and its sequel. In North America, RePlay reported The Super Spy to be the seventh most-popular arcade game in January 1991.
