= 3 Count Bout =

1993 video game

- Developer: SNK
- Publisher: SNK
- Producer: Eikichi Kawasaki
- Designers: Hiroyuki Kawano; Yasuaki Uenoyama
- Artists: Mina Kawai; Nishi Futatsu; T. Maeda
- Composer: Masahiko Hataya
- Platforms: Arcade, Neo Geo AES, Neo Geo CD
- Release: Arcade: WW: March 25, 1993; Neo Geo AES: WW: April 23, 1993; Neo Geo CD: JP: April 21, 1995; NA: October 1996
- Genre: Sports
- Modes: Single-player, multiplayer
- Arcade system: Neo Geo MVS

3 Count Bout (Note: Also known as Fire Suplex (Japanese: ファイヤー・スープレックス, Hepburn: Faiyā Sūpurekkusu) in Japan.) is a 1993 wrestling video game developed and published by SNK for the Neo Geo arcade and home platforms. It was re-released multiple times on home consoles.

== Gameplay ==
Gameplay screenshot showcasing a match with Bomberder facing off against The Gandhara.

Players can play as one of 10 fictional professional wrestlers to fight for the SWF championship title. Along with the standard wrestling match, fights locations include venues such as car parks and factories (turning it into a hardcore wrestling match, with less restrictions and the ability to use weapons). In addition to that, two players can join in together for two-on-two tag-team matches.

One of the key features of this game is its combat system. Gauges are displayed on the screen when you approach your opponent during the match. The player can give priority to the technique by hitting the button repeatedly until the gauge meter is higher than the opponent's. Additionally, there are dashing techniques from a long distance, aerial killing from the top rope, promised foul attack, and middle distance batting techniques. Not only ordinary classic match rings venues are available, but also the street can be a match location as well.

The game consists of 5 championships with their own stages. The first stage type is a wrestling ring where the opponents can bounce from the edges and can be out of bounds. The second stage type is street wrestling, where there are objects to destroy and weapons to wield. The last stage is the electricity stage where the borders are harmful and weapons are used. Press the A button to punch. Press the B button to kick. Press the C button to jump. Press the A and B buttons simultaneously for a quick moving retreat. Pull the joystick twice in a direction to rush that way. If the player rushes in the direction of a boxing ring edge, they can bounce back. If the player is down, repeatedly press the A button and pull the joystick left and right to get up. Press the C button to body drop on a downed opponent. Press the A button many times rapidly to use a special attack. Press Button A or B on a downed opponent to grab and wrestle. When the player and opponent clash in a wrestle, press the A and B buttons as fast as possible to push back. Press Button D to pin down a downed opponent and hold him for 3 seconds to win. Alternatively, some fighters have holds which can force an opponent with low stamina to submit.

== Story ==
SWF (SNK Wrestling Federation) is an organization that stands at the top of the professional wrestling world. The SWF decided to hold the "Worldwide Indiscriminate Class Tournament". The tournament is to determine the "true world champion" and allows the world's most powerful wrestlers to freely participate in the indiscriminate class with no weight limit. Moreover, the tournament incorporates a radical deathmatch, which seems to be the most severe battle in the history of professional wrestling.

Wrestlers from all over the world entered, including the current SWF heavyweight champion and some wrestlers from the underground professional wrestling organization "Hole of the Lion".

== Development and release ==
The game was released for the Neo Geo AES on April 23, 1993, and was later ported to the Neo Geo CD on April 21, 1995. Hamster Corporation re-released the game as part of their ACA Neo Geo series for the PlayStation 4, Xbox One, Nintendo Switch, Windows, Android and iOS.

== Reception ==
Reception

Review scores
Publication	Score
AllGame	(AC) 3/5 (NG) 2/5
Consoles +	(NG) 94%
GameFan	(NG) 256/400
GamePro	(NG) 16/20
HobbyConsolas	(NG) 94/100
Joypad	(NG) 83%
Mega Fun	(NG) 80%
Player One	(NG) 80%
Computer+Videogiochi	(NG) 93/100
Consolemania	(NG) 91/100
Gamest	(AC) 27/50
Play Time	(NG) 91%
Power Unlimited	(NG) 54/100
VideoGames	(NG) 7/10

In Japan, Game Machine listed 3 Count Bout on their May 1, 1993 issue as being the tenth most-popular arcade game at the time. In North America, RePlay reported 3 Count Bout to be the fourth most-popular arcade game in April 1993. The following month, RePlay listed it as the top-grossing arcade software conversion kit, while Play Meter listed 3 Count Bout as the 47th most-popular arcade game.

The game received generally positive reception from critics since its release in arcades and other platforms. AllGame's Paul Biondich noted its attempt at mixing of fighting styles from game such as WWF WrestleFest and Street Fighter II, however, Kyle Knight stated that 3 Count Bout has an "identity crisis" due to this and regarded the controls as decent during fighting mode but poorly implemented during wrestling mode. Both Biondich and Knight felt mixed in regards to the audiovisual presentation, gameplay and overall replay value. In contrast, Consoles Plus' Marc Menier and Jean-Loup Jovanovic praised the presentation, visuals, sprite animations, sound design, playability and two-player mode. However, GameFan's four reviewers commended the graphical presentation but criticized the limited sprite animation, controls and gameplay mechanics, with Sgt. Gamer in particular recommending to play the title in arcades rather than on AES.

GamePro's Scary Larry praised the visuals for being up to standards on Neo Geo and sound design but criticized the controls for being stiff and difficult opponent AI. Hobby Consolas' Manuel del Campo highly commended the film-like presentation, music and sound effects but criticized one aspect of its playability and noted the high difficulty level on the easiest setting. Likewise, Joypad's Nourdine Nini and Jean-François Morisse gave positive remarks to the number of moves for each character, graphics, animations controls and sound design but criticized the gameplay for being repetitive. In a similar manner as Larry, Mega Fun's Philipp Noak and Ulf Schneider criticized the AI opponent for being unfair but gave positive comments to the technical presentation, number of moves and two-player mode.

Player One's Christophe Delpierre praised the animated visuals, sound, difficulty and longevity but felt mixed in regards to the gameplay. Computer+Videogiochi's Paolo Cardillo and Consolemania's Piemarco Rosa also praised the animated graphics, audio, gameplay and number of moves but Cardillo criticized the game's originality, while Rosa criticized certain gameplay aspects and longevity. Play Time's Armin Thielen highly commended the title for the technical and audiovisual presentation, as well as its difficulty level. A reviewer of Dutch magazine Power Unlimited reviewed the AES version in a negative light, stating that "The sounds and images may be beautiful, what good is it if the game is unplayable? 3 Count Bout feels like it's impossible to win, and of course you shouldn't have it." VideoGames' Chris Bieniek criticized the method of executing special moves.
