= League Bowling =

1990 video game

- Developer: SNK
- Publisher: SNK
- Platforms: Arcade, Neo Geo AES, Neo Geo CD
- Release: Arcade: WW: December 10, 1990; Neo Geo AES: WW: July 1, 1991; Neo Geo CD: JP: September 9, 1994; NA: October 1996
- Genre: Sports
- Modes: Single-player, multiplayer
- Arcade system: Neo Geo MVS

League Bowling (Note: Japanese: リーグ・ボウリング, Hepburn: Rīgu Bōringu) is a 1990 bowling video game developed and published by SNK for the Neo Geo arcade and home platforms. The players controls Pete and can select balls from 8 to 15 pounds. It is the only bowling game released on the Neo Geo.

== Gameplay ==
Gameplay screenshot

League Bowling has three types of modes, played up to 4 players.

=== Regulation ===
Played just like a normal game of bowling, with 300 being a perfect score.

=== Flash ===
Values of 100 to 300 will flash on a randomizer during the time the bowler throws his shot. A strike adds the bonus flash value to the score accumulated at the end of the game. Below each strike value is a smaller point value, which is added to the score for a spare.

Unlike regular bowling, bonus shots in the tenth frame are not awarded; once a strike or spare is thrown, the game ends.

The maximum possible score is 3,000.

=== Strike 90 ===
Played just like Regulation mode except that a strike scores 90 points for the frame, and a spare scores 60 for the frame, with no carry-over bonus. 30 points are awarded in the case of a field goal (throwing the ball in between the 7 and 10 pins). Like the Flash mode, there are no bonus shots in the tenth frame.

The maximum possible score is 900.

In addition, it also has the option to link up to 4 Neo-Geo MVS machines to become the 8-player game. This is the only Neo Geo game that features 8-player support.

== Reception ==
Reception

Review scores
Publication	Score
AllGame	(NG) 3/5
Consoles +	(NG) 68%
HobbyConsolas	(NG) 85/100
Joystick	(NG) 80%
Player One	(NG) 91%

In Japan, Game Machine listed League Bowling on their February 1, 1991 issue as being the eighth most-popular arcade game at the time. Likewise, RePlay reported the game to be the twentieth most-popular arcade game at the time. The title was met with mixed to positive reviews from critics, many of which criticized its awkward controls for being passable but praised its humorous artstyle as well as the characters and their reactions.

AllGame's Kyle Knight praised the cartoon-style presentation, simple gameplay and multiplayer but criticized the audio and lack of replay value. Consoles Plus's J.B. Aerstut also commended the visual presentation, comparing it with the works of Tex Avery, audio and playability but felt mixed in regards to its longevity. HobbyConsolas' Manuel del Campo gave positive remarks to the multiplayer, character animations, appropriate music, sound and playability but criticized one gameplay aspect. Joystick's Jean-Marc Demoly and Player One's Cyril Drevet commented positively in regards to the animated audiovisual presentation, realism and longevity. Joystick also regarded it as one of the best bowling simulators in the genre but was criticized for being repetitive and limited.

== Ports ==
Tom Fulp, the founder and CEO of Newgrounds, ported the game to Adobe Flash in 2002. The port features no ball selection, a regulation mode only, fewer animations, and the different player's sprites are the same.

The game was released as part of the NEOGEO Station for the PlayStation 3 and the PlayStation Portable. In July 2011, a Virtual Console version for the Wii was released in Japan. Hamster Corporation re-released the game as part of their ACA Neo Geo series for the PlayStation 4, Xbox One, Nintendo Switch, Windows, Android and iOS.
