= Aero Fighters 3 =

1995 video game

- Japanese arcade flyer
- Developer: Video System
- Publishers: SNK: Neo Geo CD; JP: Video System; NA: SNK
- Designers: A. Ōkawara; A. Sakamura; Count IKuei
- Composers: Hiroyuki Itou; Norie Aoki; Soshi Hosoi
- Series: Aero Fighters
- Platforms: Arcade, Neo Geo AES, Neo Geo CD
- Release: October 12, 1995: Arcade; JP: October 12, 1995; NA: October 1995; EU: 1995 Neo Geo AES; JP: November 17, 1995 Neo Geo CD; JP: December 8, 1995; NA: 1995
- Genre: Scrolling shooter
- Modes: Single-player, multiplayer
- Arcade system: Neo Geo MVS

Aero Fighters 3, released in Japan as Sonic Wings 3 (Note: Japanese: ソニックウィングス3, Hepburn: Sonikkū~ingusu 3), is a 1995 vertically scrolling shooter video game developed by Video System and published by SNK for the Neo Geo arcade and home platforms.

Hamster Corporation acquired the game's rights alongside Video System's catalogue, re-releasing the game as part of their ACA Neo Geo series for the PlayStation 4, Xbox One, Nintendo Switch, Windows, Android and iOS.

== Gameplay ==
Gameplay screenshot

Ten different planes are available for selection by default, some of whom return from previous Aero Fighters games. An additional two secret characters from previous Video System games can be accessed by entering a code. Various characters can carry different numbers of power-ups (P) and bombs (B) before reaching a full stock; picking either of these up while fully stocked grants the player 2,000 points, while a full-power (F) grants 10,000.

Destroying large enemies on the ground, as well as buildings and other prominent bits of scenery, will frequently reveal any of the above powerups as well as currency icons, which change depending upon the nationality of the player's character. Currency icons are worth anywhere between 10,000 and 200 points each; picking the icons up at the very top of the screen nets the maximum, picking them up more than halfway down nets the minimum.

The game contains a total of 18 stages, of which eight will be played in each of the game's two loops using a branching system. After defeating the bosses of certain stages, a plane will appear with two destructible wings; whichever wing is destroyed first determines the next stage that is played. Stages 3 and 6 are always bonus stages; these have no boss, and will either contain enemies which release many power-ups which can be collected for 2,000 points each, or a large number of non-firing ground enemies which release currency.

The game also contains a number of secrets; both of the last bosses will very rarely be replaced by hidden bosses, who also grant hidden endings. Some smaller enemies will sometimes exhibit unusual behavior; for example, the gun turrets in the USA stage will occasionally turn into a bust of Villiam from Aero Fighters.

In two-player mode, players must use any two planes which are on the same row as each other on the character select screen. During gameplay, if both players' sprites sit exactly on top of each other, a powerful combined shot will be fired as long as neither player uses a bomb.

== Plot ==
After their presumed defeat, the evil alien forces launch a surprise attack against the Aero Fighters' base, effectively destroying their aircraft. Unable to counter the attack, they must use old World War II-era warplanes with strange modifications, in a desperate scramble for victory. Unfortunately, these planes are in terrible condition and present a great challenge to the Aero Fighters.

== Reception ==
Reception

Review scores
Publication	Score
Electronic Gaming Monthly	(NG) 19.5/40
GamePro	(NG) 15/20
HobbyConsolas	(NGCD) 90/100
M! Games	(NG) 39%
Nintendo Life	(NS) 8/10
VideoGames	(NGCD) 5/10

In Japan, Game Machine listed Aero Fighters 3 as the 20th most popular arcade game of November 1995. Aero Fighters 3 was met with mixed reception from critics. Electronic Gaming Monthly's four reviewers criticized the visual presentation and difficulty, but commended the ability to select between multiple planes, which added more replay value. Reviewing the Neo Geo AES version, GamePro's Major Mike said the game has intense action and audio, but lacks fresh gameplay and is not as fun as Aero Fighters 2. Mike particularly noted that Aero Fighters 3 has shorter stages than 2 and removes the ability to mix-and-match pilots of different nationalities in two-player mode.

MAN!AC's Andreas Knauf heavily criticized the graphics for their lack of care and strange music, regarding it as a "loveless shooting game with messed up backgrounds, annoying giant opponents and ultra-short levels". In contrast, Nintendo Life's Dave Frear commended the character roster, multiple paths, visual design, vocal music tracks and replay value. VideoGames' Frank O'Connor compared the game visually to 1941: Counter Attack, but criticized the bosses for being uninspired.
