= Samurai Shodown V =

2003 video game

- Developer: Yuki Enterprise
- Publishers: SNK Playmore; Ignition Entertainment (PS2/Xbox)
- Producer: Yasuo Tanaka
- Designers: Koji Takaya (Dorio); Tōru Sakurai
- Programmers: Kazuro Morita; M. Kawamura; Yoshihiro Nakamura
- Artists: C. Takahashi; Daisuke Shimada; Manabu Sakai
- Composers: Haruhiko Kuroiwa; Kennosuke Suemura
- Series: Samurai Shodown
- Platforms: Arcade, Neo Geo AES, PlayStation 2, Xbox
- Release: October 10, 2003
- Genre: Fighting
- Modes: Single-player, multiplayer
- Arcade system: Neo Geo MVS

Samurai Shodown V (Note: Also known as Samurai Spirits Zero (Japanese: サムライスピリッツ 零, Hepburn: Samurai Supirittsu Zero) in Japan.) is a 2003 fighting game developed and published by SNK for the Neo Geo arcade and home platforms. It is the eighth installment in the Samurai Shodown series. It was one of the last games to be released on the Neo Geo. This title takes place two years before the first Samurai Shodown.

Hamster Corporation re-released the game as part of their ACA Neo Geo series for the PlayStation 4, Xbox One, Nintendo Switch, Windows, Android and iOS.

== Gameplay ==
Gameplay screenshot showcasing a match between Mina Majikina and Kazuki Kazama.

Following the revitalization of SNK after its collapse in 2001, the company decided that it would be worthwhile to create another game in the largely-defunct Samurai Shodown series. As part of their reorganization, development duties were given over to the relatively-unknown Yuki Enterprise, which had mainly only created simulation and board games for the Simple 2000 series of PlayStation 2 games in Japan, and had no experience in developing fighting games. This announcement caused considerable unease among series fans.

In spite of this, SNK managed to raise excitement by announcing that Nobuhiro Watsuki, the creator and author of the Rurouni Kenshin manga and anime series, was hired to design some of the new characters, and they were gradually revealed by way of silhouettes on the official website, and slowly showing the official artwork. Word finally got out that the game was to be a true prequel to the rest of the series, taking place two years before Samurai Shodown. This created its own issues with the series timeline.

The gameplay was sped up slightly from Samurai Shodown IV, and the button layout was changed again.

The Slash/Bust system of the last few games was done away with, and each character now only had one version, though in several cases, the Bust mode was replaced by a new character of very similar setup.

== Synopsis ==
Seven years after the release of Samurai Shodown IV, the storyline of this game is a prequel for the rest of the series, two years before the events of the original Samurai Shodown, focusing on a new protagonist named Yoshitora Tokugawa as he and many other warriors must face the rebellion of Yoshitora's former mentor, Gaoh Kyogoku Hinowanokami who intends on conquering and unifying all of Japan under his rule.

== Development ==
SNK Playmore hired Yuki Enterprise (later became Examu) to develop a new Samurai Shodown installment, where project lead Koji Takaya was a former SNK employee and worked on the main titles of the series. Takaya and the team developed the title based on decompiled ROM of Samurai Shodown IV with their own development tools.

=== Samurai Shodown V (Xbox) ===
An Xbox version was announced for Europe by Ignition Entertainment in June 2005 for a September 2005 release with a retail price of £19.99. The game did not release on Xbox in the PAL region. It instead released exclusively in North America in January 2006.

== Reception ==
Reception

Aggregate score
Aggregator	Score
Metacritic	58%

Review scores
Publication	Score
Electronic Gaming Monthly	58%
G4	40%
GameRevolution	42%
GameSpot	69%
GameSpy	3/5
IGN	62%
Official Xbox Magazine (UK)	50%

The game had mediocre reception. GameSpot said "This 2D fighting game is a real blast from the past, but its big cast of fairly interesting characters and its online play can make it worthwhile for NeoGeo fans." IGN said "It's got lots of moves, a deep fighting system, and the online play is a big plus, but it really isn't that enjoyable in the end." GameSpy summarised it as "A competent port of an iffy game in a good series", while EGM said "this classic weapons-based fighting series has lost much of its soul. While the original cast moves as fluidly as ever, the newer faces are the epitome of mediocre design and animation". The Official Xbox Magazine said it was "an obsolete relic". Metacritic rated the Xbox version of the game 58% based on 29 critics, indicating "mixed or average reviews".
