= Fighting Golf =

1988 video game

- North American arcade flyer
- Developer: SNK
- Publisher: SNK
- Platforms: Arcade, Nintendo Entertainment System
- Release: Arcade: JP: March 1988; NA: April 1988; NES: JP: March 24, 1988; NA: September 1988
- Genre: Sports (golf)
- Modes: Single-player, multiplayer

Fighting Golf (Note: Japanese: ファイティング ゴルフ, Hepburn: Faitingu Gorufu) is a 1988 golf video game developed and published by SNK for arcades. It was ported to the Nintendo Entertainment System the same year, which was titled Lee Trevino's Fighting Golf in North America.

== Summary ==
Arcade screenshot

The player can choose between four different golfers with varying advantages and disadvantages. Birdie Tommy (Lee Trevino/Super Mex in the North American releases), Pretty Amy/Eri, Miracle Chosuke and Big Jumbo are playable. Pretty Amy has limited range, but the easiest control ("control" refers to the length of the aiming guide). Miracle Chosuke and Super Mex have average attributes. Big Jumbo has the best range, but the worst control. Despite the title, no fighting is involved in the game. The player has to avoid sand traps, water hazards, rough ground and trees.

The courses range from relatively straightforward fairways to elaborate arrangements of sand traps. The two courses available for play are the United States, which consists of mostly bunkers and super rough, and the Japan course, consisting of water and tight boundaries. The United States course is modeled after PGA West Stadium Course.

At the end of the game, the player is greeted with a photorealistic shot of the country club lodge against the setting sun and surrounded by trees.

== Reception ==
In Japan, Game Machine listed Fighting Golf as the ninth most successful table arcade unit of April 1988.

GameRevolution ranked this game number 23 on its list of the "50 Worst Video Game Names of All Time".

== Legacy ==
The game was parodied in the season 7 episode of The Simpsons titled "Marge Be Not Proud", with the game in the episode referred to by the Comic Book Guy as "Lee Carvallo's Putting Challenge". A playable, fan-made version of Lee Carvallo's Putting Challenge was released on June 15, 2020.

Hamster Corporation released the arcade version as part of their Arcade Archives series for the Nintendo Switch and PlayStation 4, as well as their Arcade Archives 2 series for the PlayStation 5 and Xbox Series X/S in October 2026.
