= Samurai Shodown VI =

2005 video game

- Japanese PlayStation 2 box art
- Developers: SNK Playmore; Yuki Enterprise
- Publisher: SNK Playmore: JP: Sega (Arcade)
- Director: Koji Takaya
- Designers: Tōru Sakurai; Masahito Koyano
- Programmers: Kazuro Morita; E. Hakumai; Sunao Tomomori
- Artists: Takkun; Eriko Kawada; Chihiro Takahashi
- Writer: Tōru Sakurai
- Composers: Kennosuke Suemura; Mitsuo Miyamoto
- Series: Samurai Shodown
- Platforms: Arcade, PlayStation 2, PlayStation Network
- Release: Arcade: JP: September 14, 2005; PlayStation 2: JP: January 26, 2006; PlayStation Network: JP: December 17, 2014 (PS3); NA: November 22, 2016 (PS4); EU: November 25, 2016 (PS4)
- Genre: Fighting game
- Modes: Single-player, multiplayer
- Arcade system: Atomiswave

Samurai Shodown VI (Note: Known in Japan as Samurai Spirits Tenkaichi Kenkakuden (サムライスピリッツ 天下一剣客伝, Samurai Supirittsu Tenkaichi Kenkakuden; lit. Samurai Spirits: Tale of the World's Greatest Swordsman)) is the tenth iteration in the Samurai Shodown series.

On December 17, 2014, the game was released as a PS2 Classic for the PlayStation 3 through the PlayStation Network, although only on the Japanese Store. In November 2016, the game was released for the PlayStation 4 in North America and Europe through the PlayStation Network, with enhanced features such as trophy support and uprendered resolution.

== Gameplay ==
The game features new backgrounds with 2D and 3D elements. It also features a "spirit select" system, which allows players to choose between six different fighting styles based on all previous series installments.

== Characters ==
Samurai Shodown VI features 36 returning playable characters, consisting of nearly every playable character and boss from the previous numbered entries, as well four new characters and two non-playable bosses. The console release adds seven additional characters, consisting of three alternate versions of existing characters and four animal companions, and makes one of the boss characters playable for a total of 48 playable characters. New characters to the series are marked in bold.

- **Andrew**
- Amakusa Shiro Tokisada
- Basara Kubikiri
- Cham Cham
- Chample (Note: Exclusive to the home release)
- Charlotte Christine Colde
- **Demon Gaoh** (Note: Non-playable boss character)
- Earthquake
- Enja
- Gaira Caffeine
- Galford D. Weller
- Kyougoku Hinowanokami Gaoh
- Gen-an Shiranui
- Genjuro Kibagami
- Hanzo Hattori
- Haohmaru
- **Iroha**
- Jubei Yagyu
- **Karakuri Ocha-Maro**
- Kazuki Kazama
- Kim Ung Che
- Kuroko (Note: Non-playable boss character in arcade; playable in home release)
- Kusaregedo
- Kyoshiro Senryo
- Mina Majikina
- Mizuki Rashojin
- Murasaki Nakoruru
- Nakoruru
- Neinhalt Sieger
- Nicotine Caffeine
- Paku Paku
- Poppy
- Rasetsu Galford
- Rasetsumaru
- Rera
- Rimururu
- Sankuro Yorozu
- Shikuru/Mamahaha
- Shizumaru Hisame
- Sogetsu Kazama
- **Sugoroku Matsuribayashi**
- Suija
- Tam Tam
- Ukyo Tachibana
- Wan Fu
- Yoshitora Tokugawa
- Yumeji Kurokouchi
- Yunfei
- Zankuro Minazuki

== Release ==
The arcade version of Samurai Shodown VI was released by Sega and runs on the Atomiswave system. The game was also released for the PlayStation 2 in Japan on January 25, 2006. The American and European home versions were released respectively on March 24 and March 29, 2009, on the PS2, PSP and Wii as part of the compilation Samurai Shodown Anthology. The PS2 release added even more playable characters, and three more spirit select systems to go along with them. With the PS2 release, virtually every character to have ever appeared in the Neo Geo games including the referee, Kuroko, and the animal characters, are all playable. The Samurai Shodown Anthology version is similar to the PS2 version except that everything is unlocked at the start. In 2020, a homebrew conversion was released for the Dreamcast.
