= Samurai Shodown IV =

1996 video game

Samurai Shodown IV: Amakusa's Revenge
- Developer: SNK
- Publishers: SNK; TNSsoft (Windows)
- Designer: Kiyoji Tomita
- Artist: Y. Koyasu
- Writer: Y. Yoshimitsu
- Composers: Hideki Asanaka; Yasumasa Yamada; Yoshihiko Kitamura
- Series: Samurai Shodown
- Platform: Arcade: Microsoft Windows, Neo Geo AES, Neo Geo CD, PlayStation, Sega Saturn
- Release: October 25, 1996: Arcade; WW: October 25, 1996 Neo Geo AES; WW: November 29, 1996 Neo Geo CD; WW: December 27, 1997 Saturn; JP: October 2, 1997 PlayStation; JP: December 25, 1997 Windows; JP: December 2000
- Genre: Fighting
- Modes: Single-player, multiplayer
- Arcade system: Neo Geo MVS

Samurai Shodown IV: Amakusa's Revenge (Note: Also known as Samurai Spirits: Amakusa's Descent (Japanese: サムライスピリッツ: 天草降臨, Hepburn: Samurai Supirittsu: Amakusa Kōrin) or TenSamu for short in Japan, and as Paewang Jeonseol: Legend of a Warrior in Korea.) is a 1996 fighting game developed and published by SNK for the Neo Geo arcade and home platforms. It is the fourth installment of the Samurai Shodown series. Chronologically, it is the second and final chapter of a story between Samurai Shodown and Samurai Shodown II, with Samurai Shodown III being the first chapter. Samurai Shodown! on the Neo Geo Pocket is a monochrome adaptation of this game, and it was followed by Samurai Shodown! 2 on the Neo Geo Pocket Color, which is a 2D adaptation of Samurai Shodown 64: Warriors Rage.

== Gameplay ==
Gameplay screenshot showcasing a match between Rimururu and Basara Kubikiri.

The ability to select from "Slash" and "Bust" versions of characters is retained from Samurai Shodown III.

Among other series changes, aerial blocking was removed entirely. One can also no longer charge one's own "pow" gauge. The off-screen delivery man was omitted entirely from the game. The "CD combo" was added, wherein a player can press the C and D buttons together, triggering a strike that can be followed up by a sequence of button taps.

SNK also added a "suicide" move, wherein one's character forfeits the round. The bonus to this is that the one committing suicide will start the next round with a full "POW" gauge. Certain finishes also enable a "fatality" move in the vein of Mortal Kombat.

== Characters ==
All twelve playable characters from Samurai Shodown III return, though some have been retouched to further enhance the cartoonish look. Three additional characters from previous games, Charlotte, Tam Tam and Jubei Yagyu, are also included.

Joining the cast are the two ninja brothers:

- Kazuki Kazama - member of the Kazama ninja clan specializing in fire jutsu, he deserts to rescue his younger sister, Hazuki, from Amakusa's clutches.
- Sogetsu Kazama - older brother to Kazuki and Hazuki who uses water jutsu; unlike Kazuki, he stays with the clan and is ordered to assassinate his brother for leaving.

Cham Cham from Samurai Shodown II also makes a playable appearance, exclusively for the PlayStation port of the game known in Japan as Samurai Spirits: Amakusa's Descent Special.

== Reception ==
Reception

Review scores
Publication	Score
Electronic Gaming Monthly	8/10, 8/10, 8/10, 8/10 (NG)
Famitsu	7/10, 7/10, 6/10, 6/10 (PS)
Nintendo Life	8/10 (VC)

In Japan, Game Machine listed Samurai Shodown IV on their December 1, 1996 issue as being the most-popular arcade game at the time. According to Famitsu, the AES version sold over 9,253 copies in its first week on the market. It was released for the PlayStation in Japan on December 25, 1997.

Reviewing the arcade version in GamePro, The Union Buster commented that Samurai Shodown IV lacks the depth of contemporaries such as Street Fighter Alpha 2 and Soul Edge, but for the same reason offers an easier pick-up-and-play experience. He was unimpressed with the two new characters but pleased with the return of those which had been dropped from the roster in Samurai Shodown III. He particularly praised the visuals, remarking that "The fighters have superb animation; several fighting stages are outright beautiful; and the special moves look awesome."

The four reviewers of Electronic Gaming Monthly praised the high number of characters and the size of the character sprites.

In a review of the Virtual Console release, Nintendo Life also gave the game an 8 out of 10, but their praise focused more on the animations, heavy challenge, and the thrilling pacing of battles, commenting, "a single slash [is] capable of turning the tide against any opponent."
