= List of Neo Geo games =

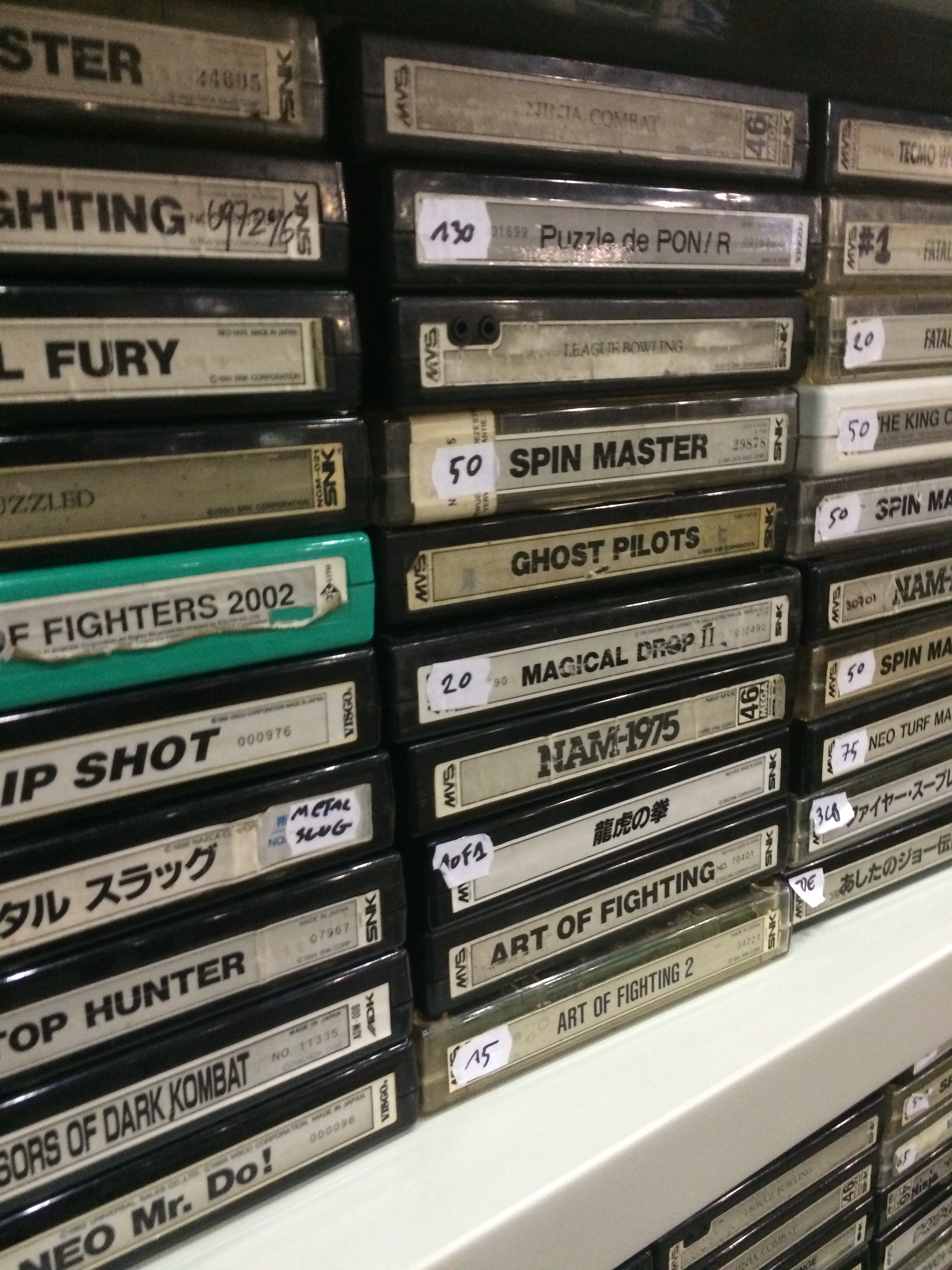
Neo Geo MVS cartridges

The Neo Geo is a video game platform developed and designed by SNK and supported from 1990 to 2004. It was released in three different iterations: a ROM cartridge-based arcade system board called the Multi Video System (MVS), a cartridge-based home video game console called the Advanced Entertainment System (AES), and a CD-ROM-based home console called the Neo Geo CD. Each system features similar hardware and runs the same library of games through different media formats. Most games were first released on the MVS, then rereleased for the home consoles. However, some never saw a home console release, and a few were released exclusively for the Neo Geo CD. This page lists every officially licensed game released for all three formats.

== Games ==
There are 156 officially licensed Neo Geo games. This list does not include unlicensed games, unlicensed conversions, prototypes, Neo Geo Pocket games, or Hyper Neo Geo 64 games.

| Platform | Description | Media format |
|---|---|---|
| MVS | Neo Geo Multi Video System | ROM Cartridge |
| AES | Neo Geo Advanced Entertainment System | ROM Cartridge |
| CD | Neo Geo CD | CD-ROM |

| Title | Developer(s) | Publisher(s) | Release date(s) | | |
| Title | Developer(s) | Publisher(s) | MVS | AES | CD |
|---|---|---|---|---|---|
| 3 Count Bout | SNK | SNK | March 25, 1993 | April 23, 1993 | April 21, 1995 |
| ADK World | ADK | ADK | Unreleased | Unreleased | November 10, 1995 |
| Aero Fighters 2 | Video System | SNK | July 18, 1994 | August 26, 1994 | September 29, 1994 |
| Aero Fighters 3 | Video System | SNK, Video System | October 12, 1995 | November 17, 1995 | December 8, 1995 |
| Aggressors of Dark Kombat | ADK | SNK, ADK | July 26, 1994 | August 26, 1994 | January 13, 1995 |
| Alpha Mission II | SNK | SNK | March 25, 1991 | July 1, 1991 | September 9, 1994 |
| Andro Dunos | Visco | SNK, Visco | June 15, 1992 | July 17, 1992 | Unreleased |
| Art of Fighting | SNK | SNK | September 24, 1992 | December 11, 1992 | September 9, 1994 |
| Art of Fighting 2 | SNK | SNK | February 3, 1994 | March 11, 1994 | September 9, 1994 |
| Art of Fighting 3: The Path of the Warrior | SNK | SNK | March 12, 1996 | April 26, 1996 | June 14, 1996 |
| Bakatono-sama Mahjong Manyūki | Monolith | Monolith | December 13, 1991 | December 20, 1991 | Unreleased |
| Bang Bead | Visco | SNK, Visco | 2000 | Unreleased | Unreleased |
| Baseball Stars 2 | SNK | SNK | April 15, 1992 | April 28, 1992 | September 9, 1994 |
| Baseball Stars Professional | SNK | SNK | April 26, 1990 | July 1, 1991 | April 21, 1995 |
| Battle Flip Shot | Visco | SNK, Visco | December 8, 1998 | Unreleased | Unreleased |
| Blazing Star | Yumekobo | SNK, Yumekobo | January 19, 1998 | February 26, 1998 | Unreleased |
| Blue's Journey | Alpha Denshi | SNK, Alpha Denshi | December 31, 1990 | July 1, 1991 | October 31, 1994 |
| Bomberman: Panic Bomber | 8ing, Hudson Soft | SNK | January 18, 1995 | Unreleased | Unreleased |
| Breakers | Visco | SNK, Visco | December 17, 1996 | March 21, 1997 | April 25, 1997 |
| Breakers Revenge | Visco | SNK, Visco | July 3, 1998 | Unreleased | Unreleased |
| Burning Fight | SNK | SNK | May 20, 1991 | August 9, 1991 | September 9, 1994 |
| Captain Tomaday | Visco | SNK, Visco | May 27, 1999 | Unreleased | Unreleased |
| Chibi Maruko-chan: Maruko Deluxe Quiz | Be Top | SNK, Takara | November 27, 1995 | January 26, 1996 | Unreleased |
| Crossed Swords | Alpha Denshi | SNK, Alpha Denshi | July 25, 1991 | October 1, 1991 | October 31, 1994 |
| Crossed Swords II | ADK | ADK | Unreleased | Unreleased | May 2, 1995 |
| Cyber-Lip | SNK | SNK | November 7, 1990 | July 1, 1991 | April 21, 1995 |
| Double Dragon | Technōs Japan | SNK, Technōs Japan | March 3, 1995 | March 31, 1995 | June 2, 1995 |
| Eight Man | Pallas, SNK | SNK | June 7, 1991 | November 20, 1991 | Unreleased |
| Far East of Eden: Kabuki Klash | Racjin, Red Entertainment | SNK, Hudson Soft | June 20, 1995 | July 28, 1995 | November 24, 1995 |
| Fatal Fury: King of Fighters | SNK | SNK | November 25, 1991 | December 20, 1991 | September 9, 1994 |
| Fatal Fury 2 | SNK | SNK | December 10, 1992 | March 5, 1993 | September 9, 1994 |
| Fatal Fury 3: Road to the Final Victory | SNK | SNK | March 27, 1995 | April 21, 1995 | April 28, 1995 |
| Fatal Fury Special | SNK | SNK | September 16, 1993 | December 22, 1993 | September 9, 1994 |
| Fight Fever | Viccom, SNK | SNK, Viccom | June 28, 1994 | Unreleased | Unreleased |
| Football Frenzy | SNK | SNK | January 31, 1992 | February 21, 1992 | September 9, 1994 |
| Galaxy Fight: Universal Warriors | Sunsoft | SNK, Sunsoft | January 24, 1995 | February 25, 1995 | April 21, 1995 |
| Ganryu | Visco | SNK, Visco | 1999 | Unreleased | Unreleased |
| Garou: Mark of the Wolves | SNK | SNK | November 26, 1999 | February 25, 2000 | Unreleased |
| Ghost Pilots | SNK | SNK | January 25, 1991 | July 1, 1991 | March 17, 1995 |
| Goal! Goal! Goal! | Visco | Visco | 1995 | Unreleased | Unreleased |
| Gururin | Face | SNK, Face | May 25, 1994 | Unreleased | Unreleased |
| Idol Mahjong Final Romance 2 | Video System | Video System | Unreleased | Unreleased | August 25, 1995 |
| Ironclad | Saurus | Saurus | Unreleased | Unreleased | September 20, 1996 |
| Janshin Densetsu: Quest of Jongmaster | Aicom | SNK | June 29, 1994 | Unreleased | March 31, 1995 |
| Karnov's Revenge | Data East | SNK, Data East | March 17, 1994 | April 28, 1994 | December 22, 1994 |
| King of the Monsters | SNK | SNK | February 25, 1991 | July 1, 1991 | Unreleased |
| King of the Monsters 2 | SNK | SNK | May 25, 1992 | June 1, 1992 | September 9, 1994 |
| Kizuna Encounter | SNK | SNK | September 20, 1996 | November 8, 1996 | Unreleased |
| Last Resort | SNK | SNK | March 23, 1992 | April 24, 1992 | September 9, 1994 |
| League Bowling | SNK | SNK | December 10, 1990 | July 1, 1991 | September 9, 1994 |
| Legend of Success Joe | Wave | SNK, Wave | July 1991 | August 30, 1991 | Unreleased |
| Magical Drop II | Data East | SNK, Data East | March 21, 1996 | April 19, 1996 | May 24, 1996 |
| Magical Drop III | Data East | SNK, Data East | February 25, 1997 | April 25, 1997 | Unreleased |
| Magician Lord | Alpha Denshi | SNK, Alpha Denshi | April 26, 1990 | July 1, 1991 | October 31, 1994 |
| Mahjong-kyō Retsuden: Nishi Nihon Hen | SNK | SNK | April 26, 1990 | July 1, 1991 | September 9, 1994 |
| Master of Syougi | ADK, SNK | SNK, ADK | September 28, 1995 | October 13, 1995 | October 20, 1995 |
| Matrimelee | Noise Factory | Playmore, Sun Amusement | March 20, 2003 | May 29, 2003 | Unreleased |
| Metal Slug | Nazca Corporation | SNK | April 19, 1996 | May 24, 1996 | July 5, 1996 |
| Metal Slug 2 | SNK | SNK | February 23, 1998 | April 2, 1998 | June 25, 1998 |
| Metal Slug 3 | SNK | SNK | March 23, 2000 | June 1, 2000 | Unreleased |
| Metal Slug 4 | MEGA, Noise Factory | Playmore, Sun Amusement, BrezzaSoft | March 27, 2002 | June 13, 2002 | Unreleased |
| Metal Slug 5 | SNK Playmore | SNK Playmore | November 13, 2003 | February 19, 2004 | Unreleased |
| Metal Slug X | SNK | SNK | March 19, 1999 | May 27, 1999 | Unreleased |
| Mina-san no Okage-sama Desu! Dai Sugoroku Taikai | Monolith | SNK, Monolith | July 25, 1991 | July 1, 1991 | Unreleased |
| Money Puzzle Exchanger | Face | Face | January 17, 1997 | Unreleased | Unreleased |
| Mutation Nation | SNK | SNK | March 16, 1992 | April 17, 1992 | February 25, 1995 |
| NAM-1975 | SNK | SNK | April 26, 1990 | July 1, 1991 | September 9, 1994 |
| Neo Bomberman | Hudson Soft | SNK, Hudson Soft | May 1, 1997 | Unreleased | Unreleased |
| Neo Drift Out: New Technology | Visco | SNK, Visco | March 28, 1996 | Unreleased | July 26, 1996 |
| Neo Geo CD Special | SNK | SNK | Unreleased | Unreleased | December 22, 1995 |
| Neo Geo Cup '98: The Road to the Victory | SNK | SNK | May 28, 1998 | July 30, 1998 | Unreleased |
| Neo Mr. Do! | Visco | Visco | June 26, 1997 | Unreleased | Unreleased |
| Neo Turf Masters | Nazca Corporation | SNK | January 29, 1996 | March 1, 1996 | May 3, 1996 |
| Nightmare in the Dark | AM Factory, Paon | SNK, Eleven, Gavaking | January 27, 2000 | Unreleased | Unreleased |
| Ninja Combat | Alpha Denshi | SNK, Alpha Denshi | July 24, 1990 | July 1, 1991 | October 31, 1994 |
| Ninja Commando | Alpha Denshi | SNK, Alpha Denshi | April 30, 1992 | May 29, 1992 | October 31, 1994 |
| Ninja Master's: Haō Ninpō Chō | ADK, SNK | SNK, ADK | May 27, 1996 | June 28, 1996 | September 27, 1996 |
| Over Top | ADK | SNK, ADK | April 26, 1996 | May 24, 1996 | July 26, 1996 |
| Pleasure Goal: 5 on 5 Mini Soccer | Saurus | SNK, Saurus | July 19, 1996 | Unreleased | July 19, 1996 |
| Pochi and Nyaa | Aiky, Taito | Taito | December 24, 2003 | Unreleased | Unreleased |
| Pop'n Bounce | Video System | Video System, Visco | 1997 | Unreleased | Unreleased |
| Power Spikes II | Video System | Taito, Video System | October 19, 1994 | Unreleased | March 17, 1995 |
| Prehistoric Isle 2 | Saurus, Yumekobo | SNK | September 27, 1999 | Unreleased | Unreleased |
| Pulstar | Aicom | SNK | August 28, 1995 | September 29, 1995 | October 27, 1995 |
| Puzzle Bobble | Taito | SNK, Taito | December 21, 1994 | Unreleased | May 2, 1995 |
| Puzzle Bobble 2 | Ukiyotei | SNK | September 1999 | Unreleased | Unreleased |
| Puzzle de Pon! | Visco | SNK, Visco | November 28, 1995 | Unreleased | Unreleased |
| Puzzle de Pon! R | Visco | SNK, Visco | 1997 | Unreleased | Unreleased |
| Puzzled | SNK | SNK | November 20, 1990 | July 1, 1991 | September 9, 1994 |
| Quiz Daisōsasen: The Last Count Down | SNK | SNK | July 1991 | August 30, 1991 | Unreleased |
| Quiz King of Fighters | Saurus, SNK | SNK, Saurus | February 1, 1995 | March 10, 1995 | April 7, 1995 |
| Quiz Meitantei Neo & Geo: Quiz Daisōsasen Part 2 | SNK | SNK | March 1992 | April 24, 1992 | Unreleased |
| Rage of the Dragons | Evoga Entertainment, Noise Factory | Playmore, BrezzaSoft | June 6, 2002 | September 26, 2002 | Unreleased |
| Ragnagard | Saurus, System Vision | SNK, Saurus | June 13, 1996 | July 26, 1996 | August 23, 1996 |
| Real Bout Fatal Fury | SNK | SNK | December 21, 1995 | January 26, 1996 | February 23, 1996 |
| Real Bout Fatal Fury 2: The Newcomers | SNK | SNK | March 20, 1998 | April 29, 1998 | July 23, 1998 |
| Real Bout Fatal Fury Special | SNK | SNK | January 28, 1997 | February 28, 1997 | March 30, 1997 |
| Riding Hero | SNK | SNK | July 24, 1990 | July 1, 1991 | May 26, 1995 |
| Robo Army | SNK | SNK | October 30, 1991 | December 20, 1991 | April 21, 1995 |
| Samurai Shodown | SNK | SNK | July 7, 1993 | August 11, 1993 | September 9, 1994 |
| Samurai Shodown II | SNK | SNK | October 28, 1994 | December 2, 1994 | December 15, 1994 |
| Samurai Shodown III: Blades of Blood | SNK | SNK | November 15, 1995 | December 1, 1995 | December 29, 1995 |
| Samurai Shodown IV: Amakusa's Revenge | SNK | SNK | October 25, 1996 | November 29, 1996 | December 27, 1996 |
| Samurai Shodown V | Yuki Enterprise | SNK Playmore | October 10, 2003 | December 11, 2003 | Unreleased |
| Samurai Shodown V Special | Yuki Enterprise | SNK Playmore | April 22, 2004 | July 15, 2004 | Unreleased |
| Savage Reign | SNK | SNK | April 25, 1995 | May 26, 1995 | June 16, 1995 |
| Sengoku | SNK | SNK | February 12, 1991 | July 1, 1991 | March 17, 1995 |
| Sengoku 2 | SNK | SNK | February 18, 1993 | April 9, 1993 | March 17, 1995 |
| Sengoku 3 | Noise Factory | SNK | July 18, 2001 | October 25, 2001 | Unreleased |
| Shinsetsu Samurai Spirits Bushidō Retsuden | Asatsu-DK, Fuji TV, SNK | SNK | Unreleased | Unreleased | June 27, 1997 |
| Shock Troopers | Saurus | SNK | November 11, 1997 | Unreleased | Unreleased |
| Shock Troopers: 2nd Squad | Saurus | SNK | November 6, 1998 | June 24, 1999 | Unreleased |
| SNK vs. Capcom: SVC Chaos | SNK Playmore | SNK Playmore | July 24, 2003 | November 13, 2003 | Unreleased |
| Soccer Brawl | SNK | SNK | February 14, 1992 | March 13, 1992 | March 31, 1995 |
| Spinmaster | Data East | SNK, Data East | December 16, 1993 | February 18, 1994 | Unreleased |
| Stakes Winner | Saurus | SNK, Saurus | September 27, 1995 | October 27, 1995 | March 22, 1996 |
| Stakes Winner 2 | Saurus | SNK | September 24, 1996 | December 13, 1996 | Unreleased |
| Street Slam | Data East | SNK, Data East | December 8, 1994 | December 9, 1994 | January 20, 1995 |
| Strikers 1945 Plus | Psikyo | SNK, Psikyo | December 24, 1999 | Unreleased | Unreleased |
| Super Baseball 2020 | Pallas, SNK | SNK | September 20, 1991 | October 25, 1991 | February 25, 1995 |
| Super Dodge Ball | Technōs Japan | SNK, Technōs Japan | 1996 | Unreleased | Unreleased |
| Super Sidekicks | SNK | SNK | December 14, 1992 | February 19, 1993 | March 31, 1995 |
| Super Sidekicks 2: The World Championship | SNK | SNK | April 19, 1994 | May 27, 1994 | September 9, 1994 |
| Super Sidekicks 3: The Next Glory | SNK | SNK | March 7, 1995 | April 7, 1995 | June 23, 1995 |
| Tecmo World Soccer '96 | Tecmo | SNK, Tecmo | 1996 | Unreleased | Unreleased |
| The Irritating Maze | Saurus, SNK | SNK | August 25, 1997 | Unreleased | Unreleased |
| The King of Fighters '94 | SNK | SNK | August 25, 1994 | October 1, 1994 | November 2, 1994 |
| The King of Fighters '95 | SNK | SNK | July 25, 1995 | September 1, 1995 | September 29, 1995 |
| The King of Fighters '96 | SNK | SNK | July 30, 1996 | September 27, 1996 | October 25, 1996 |
| The King of Fighters '96 Collection | SNK | SNK | Unreleased | Unreleased | February 14, 1997 |
| The King of Fighters '97 | SNK | SNK | July 28, 1997 | September 25, 1997 | October 30, 1997 |
| The King of Fighters '98: The Slugfest | SNK | SNK | July 23, 1998 | September 23, 1998 | December 23, 1998 |
| The King of Fighters '99: Millennium Battle | SNK | SNK | July 22, 1999 | September 23, 1999 | December 2, 1999 |
| The King of Fighters 2000 | SNK | SNK | July 26, 2000 | December 21, 2000 | Unreleased |
| The King of Fighters 2001 | Eolith, BrezzaSoft | Playmore, Sun Amusement | November 15, 2001 | March 14, 2002 | Unreleased |
| The King of Fighters 2002: Challenge to Ultimate Battle | Eolith, Playmore | Playmore, Eolith | October 10, 2002 | December 19, 2002 | Unreleased |
| The King of Fighters 2003 | SNK NeoGeo | SNK Playmore | December 12, 2003 | March 18, 2004 | Unreleased |
| The Last Blade | SNK | SNK | December 5, 1997 | January 29, 1998 | March 26, 1998 |
| The Last Blade 2 | SNK | SNK | November 25, 1998 | January 28, 1999 | February 27, 1999 |
| The Super Spy | SNK | SNK | October 8, 1990 | July 1, 1991 | September 9, 1994 |
| The Ultimate 11: SNK Football Championship | SNK | SNK | October 16, 1996 | December 20, 1996 | Unreleased |
| Thrash Rally | Alpha Denshi | SNK, Alpha Denshi | November 8, 1991 | December 20, 1991 | October 31, 1994 |
| Top Hunter: Roddy & Cathy | SNK | SNK | May 18, 1994 | June 24, 1994 | September 29, 1994 |
| Top Player's Golf | SNK | SNK | May 23, 1990 | July 1, 1991 | September 9, 1994 |
| Twinkle Star Sprites | ADK | SNK, ADK | November 25, 1996 | January 31, 1997 | February 21, 1997 |
| Viewpoint | Aicom, Sammy | SNK, Sammy | November 20, 1992 | December 11, 1992 | February 25, 1995 |
| Voltage Fighter Gowcaizer | Technōs Japan | SNK, Technōs Japan | September 18, 1995 | October 20, 1995 | November 24, 1995 |
| Waku Waku 7 | Sunsoft | SNK, Sunsoft | November 21, 1996 | December 27, 1996 | Unreleased |
| Windjammers | Data East | SNK, Data East | February 17, 1994 | April 8, 1994 | January 20, 1995 |
| World Heroes | Alpha Denshi | SNK, Alpha Denshi | July 28, 1992 | September 11, 1992 | March 17, 1995 |
| World Heroes 2 | ADK | SNK, ADK | April 26, 1993 | June 4, 1993 | April 14, 1995 |
| World Heroes 2 Jet | ADK | SNK, ADK | April 26, 1994 | June 10, 1994 | November 11, 1994 |
| World Heroes Perfect | ADK | SNK, ADK | May 25, 1995 | June 30, 1995 | July 21, 1995 |
| Zed Blade | NMK | SNK | September 13, 1994 | Unreleased | Unreleased |
| ZinTrick | ADK | ADK | Unreleased | Unreleased | September 27, 1996 |
| ZuPaPa! | Face | SNK | September 1, 2001 | Unreleased | Unreleased |
