= Bang Bang Busters =

2010 video game

- Developer: Visco Corporation
- Publishers: Neo Conception International; JoshProd (Dreamcast)
- Director: Don Gabacho
- Producer: Tetsuo Akiyama
- Designers: Ebi Taisyo; Tel.Y
- Programmers: Kenichi Imamatsu; Kentaro Masakane
- Artists: Hirofumi Mawatari; Kaoru Ishizawa; Makoto Nobetani
- Writer: Ebi Taisyo
- Composer: Kiyoshi Kusatsu
- Platforms: Arcade, Dreamcast, Neo Geo AES, Neo Geo CD
- Release: 2010: Neo Geo AES; JP: December 2010; NA: April 2011 Arcade; WW: 15 August 2011 Neo Geo CD; WW: June 2012 Dreamcast; EU: July 2018; NA: November 2018
- Genre: Platform
- Modes: Single-player, multiplayer
- Arcade system: Neo Geo MVS

Bang Bang Busters (Note: Japanese: バン バン バスターズ, Hepburn: Ban Ban Basutāzu; also known as Bang Busters and Bang² Busters) is a 2010 platform video game developed by Visco Corporation and originally published by Neo Conception International for the Neo Geo AES (home). Taking place on the fictional planet of Palua in the future, where an evil being known as Honey plots to have his own galaxy, players assume the role of Lazy and Refia in order to prevent Honey and his followers from realizing their plan. Its gameplay mainly consists of platforming mixed with action elements using a main two-button configuration.

Headed by Visco founder Tetsuo Akiyama and Breakers producer Don Gabacho, Bang Bang Busters was created by most of the same team that previously worked on several projects at Visco. Though it was initially launched for the Neo Geo AES, the game was later released for both Neo Geo MVS (arcade) and Neo Geo CD in 2011 and 2012 respectively, as well for the Dreamcast in 2018.

== Gameplay ==
Gameplay screenshot

Bang Bang Busters is a platform game similar to Snow Bros. and the Neo Geo's own Nightmare in the Dark and ZuPaPa!, where the players assume control of Lazy (P1) and Refia (P2) across seven stages comprising multiple levels that take place on planet Palua, each with a boss at the end that must be fought before progressing any further, in order to stop an evil being known as Honey and his followers before the former has his own galaxy as the main objective.

The players must throw energy projectiles at enemies to inflate them with air, which is reminiscent of Dig Dug. From there, players can grab the inflated enemies to perform a variety of actions such as launching them against other enemies at any direction by holding the attack button, perform a dash throw by double-tapping the joystick left or right, as well as float above the ground by repeatedly tapping the jump button. Any enemy inflated with air cannot move until it shakes it off. Defeated enemies may spawn power-ups and items like a speed increaser, a bomb that obliterates any enemy caught in its blast radius, among others. Players can sustain a number of enemy hits, at the expense of losing power as a penalty, but the game is over after taking one last hit unless the players decide to continue playing.

== Development and release ==
Bang Bang Busters was created by most of the same team that previously worked on several projects at Visco Corporation. Its development was helmed by Visco founder Tetsuo Akiyama and Breakers producer Don Gabacho, with Yasuhisa Itoi acting as supervisor. Ebi Taisyo and Tel.Y served as designer, with Taisyo also serving as writer. Artists Hirofumi Mawatari, Makoto Nobetani and Kaoru Ishizawa designed the characters, while Kentaro Masakane and Kenichi Imamatsu were the programmers. The music was composed by Kiyoshi Kusatsu, while other people also collaborated during development. It was initially slated to be co-published and distributed by SNK.

Bang Bang Busters was initially showcased at trade shows and intended to be released in 1994, and again in 2000, but was never released until 2010, when independent developer and publisher Neo Conception International released the AES version as part of an acquisition deal with Visco in regards to the rights of their intellectual properties. Although its production number during development remained unknown, it was later revealed to be officially assigned with the number 71. The title was then launched for Neo Geo MVS in 2011 and later for Neo Geo CD by N.C.I. in 2012. Years later, an officially licensed port by Visco for the Dreamcast was released by JoshProd worldwide in 2018.
