= Baseball Stars =

1989 video game

- North American NES box art
- Developer: SNK
- Publishers: SNK; Nintendo (arcade)
- Series: Baseball Stars
- Platforms: NES, arcade
- Release: 1989
- Genre: Sports (baseball)
- Modes: Single-player, multiplayer
- Arcade system: PlayChoice-10

Baseball Stars (Note: Known in Japan as Baseball Star Mezase Sankan Ō (Japanese: ベースボールスター めざせ三冠王, Hepburn: Bēsubōru Sutā Mezase Sankan Ō; lit. Baseball Stars Triple Crown)) is a 1989 baseball video game developed and published by SNK for the Nintendo Entertainment System. It was also released in arcades by Nintendo through their PlayChoice-10 arcade system. Baseball Stars was the first baseball game to have battery save backup, which would become the norm across NES games. This allowed players to create a team, configure baseball league & play a season, and the game's memory chip stored cumulative statistics.

== Features ==
Baseball Stars was the first baseball game to have battery backup on any console, and the first NES sports game to have battery backup. This allowed players to create a team, configure baseball league & play a season, and the game's memory chip stored cumulative statistics. Baseball Stars was also the first sports game for the NES to have a create a player feature, giving gamers the power to name their players, as well as their teams. The game also introduced a role playing element; as each game played earns the winning team money, and the amount won is directly related to the sum of the prestige ratings of the players from both teams (as prestige determines how many paying fans attend the game). The money can be used to purchase upgrades to the various abilities of players currently on the roster, or it can be used to purchase pre-designed players (available in the Rookie, Veteran, and All-Star categories). Also a first, a hidden feature allows players to hire female baseball players.

== Gameplay ==
Simple graphics are coupled with repetitive upbeat 8-bit music. The pitching is simple: curve balls, fast balls, off-speed pitches, and sinkers. The batting is a swing on a level plane, thus it is simply a question of timing. The fielding, at the time, was a revolution in arcade baseball; it achieved a level of realism unseen prior to its release. This realism, coupled with ease-of-fielding features contributed to the game's popularity. These ease-of-fielding features are characterized by examples such as off-screen fielders automatically drifting towards fly balls, fielders catching balls anywhere near them, the ability to jump and dive, infielders shifting to prevent extra base hits down the line when men are on base, etc.

It is possible to deliver unhittable pitches that would "drop" as they crossed home plate, the only clue would be a high-pitched squeak as the pitch came towards home plate. However, despite the high sound, sometimes these pitches failed to drop and in fact crossed home plate for strikes.

=== Seasons and vs. ===
The main menu for Baseball Stars. From here all the different options are accessible.

Baseball Stars includes a simple one-off versus mode, but it provides the option of creating a mini-league of up to six teams, with each team playing up to 25 games against every other team. That means a season with a maximum 125 game schedule can be created. When making a season, one chooses how many teams, how many games, and which teams are controlled by the AI (computer) and which are controlled by the gamers. In vs. mode, no stats, such as wins, losses, hits, or home runs are kept but money can still be won when a player controlled team plays against an AI-controlled team. No money is won in this mode when it is player vs. player. Versus mode games can be considered exhibition games.

=== Teams ===
There can be a total of 14 teams. Eight teams come with the game and six more teams can be created. The original eight cannot in any way be edited or changed.

Although the game does not use any real Major League Baseball teams, one of the default teams, the American Dreams, included players with names that are based on real (former) baseball players such as "Pete" (Pete Rose), "Hank" (Hank Aaron), "Babe" (Babe Ruth), "Sandie" (Sandy Koufax), "Cy" (Cy Young), "Denny" (Denny McLain), and "Willie" (Willie Mays). In addition, the Japan Robins included a player named "Oh," presumably after Sadaharu Oh of Japan's Nippon Professional Baseball.

The other default teams are the Ninja BlackSox, Brave Warriors, Japan Robins, World Powers, Ghastly Monsters, Lovely Ladies (an all women's team), and SNK Crushers.

When creating a new team, one is given the option of choosing its main strength (for example defense, running, batting, balanced, etc.). This does not mean that a chosen strength will remain with the team forever. The option simply favors the chosen attribute when the computer randomly generates the players. Each new team gets about $30,000 and 18 players (5 pitchers, 8 batters, and 5 pinch hitters) to start. From there, games are played and games that are won earn money for the team. Players on created teams can be modified and improved as well as traded amongst other created teams. A pitcher cannot be traded for a batter; it must always be batter for batter or pitcher for pitcher. There is also a free agent market in which players can be bought ranging in price from $5,000 to $2,980,000. Since there is a limit of 18 players per team, before a free agent can be bought, a player must be fired. If a player is traded for a player with superior attributes, the better player's attributes are diminished. Each player also has a maximum number of attribute points possible (out of 90) with some players having higher eventual potential than others.

=== Statistics ===
In season play, the game keeps track of various stats. By going into the SEE STANDINGS menu, it can be seen how each team's win–loss record compares to the other team(s). The player can also view the top ten leaders in batting average, home runs, RBIs, pitching ERA, pitching wins, and saves.

Each individual player's batting average and home run totals can be seen when that player is up to bat and individual pitcher's ERA is shown when that pitcher is pitching. With the exception of a pitcher's ERA, stats are current when a player steps into the batter's box.

=== Mercy rules ===
The game has a 10-run mercy rule. Thus, if at the end of any inning, one team is up by at least 10 runs, the game is called in favor of the leading team. In addition to the 10-run mercy rule, there is also a 100-run mercy rule. If at any point in the game one team attains a lead of 100 or more, play is immediately stopped and a winner is declared, even though the inning is not over. For example, if the visiting team scores 100 runs in the top of the first inning, the visiting team will be declared the winner and the home team will not even have the chance to bat. If the game remains tied after 18 innings, the game is over and no winner is declared; all hits and other stats are not saved - as if the game never happened.

=== Player improvements ===
As stated above, when money is won, it can be applied to upgrade a player. For batters, there are six abilities that can be augmented. For pitchers, there are eleven. Each ability can be assigned up to 15 points. Each player has a maximum number of points allowed and the higher the "max" of the player, the more valuable he could become.

== Reception ==
Reception

Review score
| Publication | Score |
|---|---|
| Computer Entertainer | 7.5/8 |

Baseball Stars was a critical success, often referred to as the best baseball game on the NES platform, and as such, has become a franchise series for SNK, spawning five sequels, and its "create player" and "create team" functions have become standard features in sports games. In 1997 Electronic Gaming Monthly ranked the NES version as number 87 on their "100 Best Games of All Time". Citing the customizable teams and players, full season play, stat tracking, and sense of fun, they assessed it as "every bit as fun as it was eight years ago when it was the best baseball game the NES ever saw". IGN placed it at #28 in the article "Top 100 NES Games". Baseball Stars placed #3 on Yahoo!'s "Top 5 Best Old School Sports Video Games". Baseball Stars was once voted most popular baseball game according to a poll taken by Nintendo Power magazine. David Littman, a producer on EA's NHL series of games, stated that the popular GM mode in those games was originally inspired by Baseball Stars. It received a perfect 5-star rating in the book Ultimate Nintendo: Guide to the NES Library 1985–1995.

== Sequels ==
In 1991, a sequel, Baseball Stars 2, was released by Romstar, but it was far less popular than the original. Reasons for this included the inability to change the name of a gamer-created team or names of the players on a gamer-created team, and unimproved graphics over the original. Two more sequels were made for SNK's console, the Neo-Geo:

- Baseball Stars Professional (1990, one of the first Neo-Geo games published) featured all the teams in the original Baseball Stars for the NES, but the teams' features could not be changed, gamers could only play as them.
- Baseball Stars 2 (1992) featured 18 teams across 2 leagues (exciting league & fighting league) and put more emphasis on graphics and actual gameplay (for example, being able to change pitchers or batters and powering up batters which increased the size of your bat).

Two additional games were made with the Baseball Stars title for SNK's handheld systems, Neo Geo Pocket and Neo Geo Pocket Color: Baseball Stars and Baseball Stars Color. Baseball Stars was released only in Japan and Europe, but Baseball Stars Color was released in North America. Baseball Stars Color was later re-released as part of Neo Geo Pocket Color Selection Vol. 2 in 2022.

Finally there was one other Nintendo baseball game that used that same engine that was featured in Baseball Stars, although it was not officially a Baseball Stars game, Little League Baseball: Championship Series (1990)

The Neo-Geo game Super Baseball 2020 share similar gameplay with the series, but in a futuristic, science fiction settings.
