= Mega Twins =

1990 video game

- Japanese arcade flyer
- Developers: Capcom (arcade); Visco (Mega Drive/Genesis); NEC Avenue (PC Engine)
- Publishers: Capcom (arcade); U.S. Gold (Amiga, ST); Sega (Mega Drive/Genesis); NEC Avenue (PC Engine)
- Composer: Hiromitsu Takaoka
- Platforms: Arcade, Amiga, Atari ST, Mega Drive, PC Engine CD-ROM
- Release: 1990
- Genre: Platform
- Modes: Single-player, multiplayer
- Arcade system: CP System

Mega Twins, known as Chiki Chiki Boys (Note: Japanese: チキチキボーイズ, Hepburn: Chiki Chiki Bōizu) in Japan and Europe is a 1990 platform video game developed and published by Capcom for arcades.

== Plot ==
The game features two twins who are attempting to re-take control of their land, Alurea, after a monster unexpectedly attacks, destroying everything in its path. The people of Alurea have lived in peace for a thousand years and have forgotten how to fight, yet the land's only survivors, the twin sons of the king, must take up the challenge and return their kingdom to its former glory. The two twins, aged around 15 at the time the game takes place, venture forth in search of a legendary stone known as "Dragon Blue Eyes", which is rumoured to be able to put everything back to rights.

== Gameplay ==
The game is a scrolling platform game, where the players control the twins. The game can be played alone (in which case only one of the twins is present), or with two players together controlling one twin each.

In addition to moving around, the players can jump and also cling on to vertical walls, allowing them to climb to areas that would otherwise be out of reach. Each player is armed with a magic sword, which is the main weapon used against the enemies in the game. Magic bombs can also be collected as the game progresses, each of which will cause damage to all enemies on the screen when fired. Only a limited number of these bombs can be carried by the players at a time. The blue twin does more damage with his sword, while the red twin can carry more magic spells at a time.

Each player has an energy bar which is depleted each time contact is made with an enemy or projectile. When the energy reaches zero, the player loses a life.

Chests are scattered throughout the game (some of which are hidden and must be discovered), the majority of which contain coins that add point to the players' scores, but some of them contain power ups and bonuses such as a pill that replenishes the players' energy bars and an enhanced magic sword.

=== Levels ===
The game is made up of nine levels:

- Round 1 – the earth—consisting of a forest section and a lava-filled cavern. The goddess Callia is encountered at the end of this level.
- Round 2 – the heavens—at the end, the Shrine of Meius, the god of the heavens, is reached.
- Round 3 – under the sea—during which the twins travel through a haunted sunken pirate ship.
- Round 4, stage 1 – jungle/crystal caverns.
- Round 4, stage 2 – the underwater foundations.
- Round 4, stage 3 – the monster castle dungeon.
- Round 4, stage 4 – into the sky.
- Round 4, stage 5 – ascent to the top of monster castle.
- Round 5 – escape to paradise.

The player is able to select to start on any of the first three levels, but the remaining levels can only be accessed sequentially.

== Ports ==
U.S. Gold released ports of Mega Twins for the Atari ST and Amiga in 1991 . Ports for the Commodore 64, ZX Spectrum, and Amstrad CPC were advertised, but were never published, though unfinished Spectrum and Amstrad versions have since surfaced on the Internet.

A Mega Drive/Genesis port of the game was released by Sega in 1992 and 1993. Developed by Visco Corporation, it was released in North America and Europe under the game's original Japanese title of Chiki Chiki Boys. This port lacks the 2-player cooperative mode, but is otherwise identical to the arcade version in terms of content and quality.

A version for the Capcom Power System Changer was planned and previewed but never released.

A PC Engine Super CD-ROM² port was released in 1994 exclusively in Japan by NEC Avenue. This port features enhanced versions of most of the arcade's BGM soundtrack in CD-DA format, but some used the PC Engine's sound chip. Unlike the Genesis port, the PC Engine Super CD-ROM² version includes multiplayer.

== Reception ==
Reception

Review scores
Publication	Score
Computer and Video Games	86% (Arcade)
Mega Action	85% (Genesis)
Mega Guide	Positive
Mega Force	85% (Genesis)
Player One	84% (Genesis)
Power Unlimited	60% (Genesis)
Nottingham Post	54% (Genesis)

Julian Rignall of Computer and Video Games magazine gave the arcade game an 86% score. Mega Action praised the graphics calling it "wholly impressive" and noting the wide variety of enemies without much repetition in gameplay. They concluded with a review score of 85%. Mega Guide gave a positive review praising the gameplay as "tough and incredibly addictive" and commented that the main characters are wonderfully animated. The only criticism they had was the game does not have a 2 player mode. Power Unlimited gave a review score of 60%; although they called its gameplay "solid", they felt that there were better similar games in the platform genre. Steve Fountain of Nottingham Post gave the Genesis version 54% and called it another "colourful" platform game that will entertain young players for short periods.

== Legacy ==
The game is included in Capcom Classics Collection: Remixed for the PlayStation Portable, and Capcom Classics Collection Volume 2 for PlayStation 2 and Xbox, both released in 2006. It is also included in Capcom Arcade Stadium.
