= Caliber .50 =

1989 video game

- Arcade flyer
- Developers: SETA Corporation (Arcade); Visco Corporation (Genesis/Megadrive)
- Publishers: Able Corporation (Arcade); Mentrix Software (Genesis/Megadrive)
- Designer: Masaharu Ohno
- Composers: Hiroshi Taguchi, Takayuki Suzuki, Hisashi Yotsumoto
- Platforms: Arcade, Sega Genesis/Megadrive
- Release: Arcade: NA: 1989; Genesis: NA: December 1991
- Genre: Scrolling shooter
- Modes: Single-player, multiplayer

Caliber .50 is a 1989 scrolling shooter arcade game developed by SETA Corporation. A port of the game was released for the Sega Genesis in 1991.

== Gameplay ==
The player faces a large number of enemy troops

Players control a United States Air Force pilot who was taken as a prisoner of war in Vietnam in 1972. The pilot must escape the prison compound by battling enemy soldiers with guns and grenades. Various power-ups are available that give the player use of various other weapons including a machine gun and flamethrower. Enemy vehicles such as a plane can also be commandeered.

The Sega Genesis version is single-player only, as the player now controls Captain Addis of the United States Army, who must rescue his fellow soldiers twenty years after he failed to retrieve his men during the Vietnam War. He must now re-navigate through the Ho Chi Minh trail in order to liberate his captured comrades-in-arms. Surviving soldiers are displayed by the dog tags that appear on the screen at the end of each level. An option menu allows players to choose from either an easy, normal, or hard difficulty level in addition to the number of initial lives. This version expands on the arcade version with extra stages and bosses, and was advertised as being "2.5 times longer" than the arcade game.

== Reception ==
In Japan, Game Machine listed Caliber .50 on their December 15, 1989 issue as being the second most-successful table arcade unit of the month.

The game has been compared to SNK's Ikari Warriors. Crash pointed out that like Ikari Warriors, a vehicle can be commandeered in Caliber .50. Computer and Video Games compared the two games as well, calling Caliber .50 "miles better" than SNK's game. Crash called the game "difficult" but said "there's enough blasting action to stop you from kicking the cabinet in frustration" and that the game was "Well worth a look." Meanwhile, Computer and Video Games wrote "Anyone who enjoys a good shoot'em up should love this..." and gave the game an 87% overall rating.
