= Little League Baseball: Championship Series =

1990 video game

- Cover art
- Developer: SNK
- Publisher: SNK
- Platform: NES
- Release: JP: October 6, 1989; NA: July 1990
- Genre: Arcade baseball
- Modes: Single-player; Multiplayer

Little League Baseball: Championship Series is a 1990 video game for the Nintendo Entertainment System.

== Summary ==
Trying to catch the ball in the outfield.

The player gets a choice between 16 Little League Baseball teams from around the world, ranging from Texas and Puerto Rico to Chinese Taipei.

Single-player mode results in a mandatory international tournament while two-player mode allows for some exhibition play. Every game is six innings long, excluding extra innings, but games may end early by mercy rule if a team is ahead by 10 or more runs. Players can be taken out of the game and placed back in like real Little League Baseball. Unlike Little League Baseball, there is no rule making it mandatory for everyone to have at turn at bat and in the field for at least two innings. A power analysis screen rates each team in batting, pitching, running, and defense. There is a relative amount of freedom for pitchers and batters in the game, giving them nearly full movement in the batter's box and the pitcher's mound. Each player is given an overall rating which ranges from 1 (awful) to 5 (perfect).

This game has the same engine as the NES video game Baseball Stars. While the actual cartridge is still common today through video game collectors and Internet hobbyist sites, the original game box and instruction manual have an "average" level of rarity and are harder to find.

== Ratings ==
Nintendojo gave this game a 95% rating in a review done in 2003.

== See also ==
- List of Nintendo Entertainment System games
