= Andro Dunos =

1992 video game

- Developer: Visco Corporation
- Publisher: SNK
- Director: Don Gabacho
- Producer: Tetsuo Akiyama
- Designer: Yuji Masuda
- Programmer: R. Mutoh
- Platforms: Arcade, Neo Geo AES, Neo Geo CD, Dreamcast
- Release: WW: 15 June 1992
- Genre: Scrolling shooter
- Modes: Single-player, multiplayer
- Arcade system: Neo Geo MVS

Andro Dunos (Note: Japanese: アンドロデュノス, Hepburn: Andoro De~yunosu) is a scrolling shooter arcade video game developed by Visco Corporation and originally published by SNK on June 15, 1992. It is the first title to be created by Visco for both the Neo Geo MVS (arcade) and Neo Geo AES (home) platforms. Andro Dunos, along with 1996's Breakers are the only two Visco developed games to be officially licensed for distribution on the Neo Geo AES platform. All other Visco games were only released on the Neo Geo MVS arcade platform.

Taking place on a futuristic sci-fi setting where an unknown alien race from outer space has steadily increased their invasion activities, players assume control of the Yellow Cherry and Red Fox space fighter crafts in a last-ditch effort for mankind to overthrow the alien forces. Though it was initially launched for the Neo Geo MVS, Andro Dunos was later released for the Neo Geo AES on July 17 of the same year.

Andro Dunos was met with mixed reception from both critics and reviewers alike since its initial release on the MVS and later on the AES, who commended various aspects of the title such as the colorful and detailed graphics, sound design, simplistic controls and the ability to choose between multiple weapons, but the gameplay was criticized for being unremarkable and not original.

A sequel developed by Picorinne Soft and published by Just for Games and PixelHeart titled Andro Dunos II was released in March 2022 for Microsoft Windows, Nintendo 3DS, Nintendo Switch, and PlayStation 4, with versions for the Dreamcast and Xbox One being released later in the same year.

== Gameplay ==
Gameplay screenshot

Andro Dunos is a scrolling shoot 'em up game reminiscent of Hellfire and Whip Rush where players take control of the Neo Type space fighter crafts Yellow Cherry (P1) and Red Fox (P2), which are sent by the defense system of Earth across eight levels that take place on a futuristic sci-fi setting, where an unknown alien race from outer space who have steadily increased their invasion activities against humankind that must be eliminated in order to finish a long lasting war as the main objective. The game starts over repeatedly when finished. In addition to the single-player mode, the game also features a two-player cooperative multiplayer mode. If a memory card is present, the players are allowed to save their progress and resume into the last stage the game saved at.

A notable feature of the game is the ability to choose between four different weapon sets at any given time in a linear order by pressing the B button and they can be increased up to multiple times from their original state, while charging the currently selected weapon with the A button allows the ships to unleash a powerful shot against enemies. However, this strategy is a risky proposition for players, as the weapon decreases its power level down to one, weakening the ship's current firepower as a result. If the player's ship is hit by enemy fire, they will be respawned but with the penalty of decreasing the ship's power to one level before being hit. Once all lives are lost, the game is over unless players insert more credits into the arcade machine to continue playing, which resets the main weapon down to level two and the other three sub-weapons down to the first level as well.

== Release ==
Andro Dunos was initially launched for the arcades by SNK on June 15, 1992, becoming the first title developed by Visco Corporation to be released on the Neo Geo MVS hardware. The game was also released for the Neo Geo AES on July 17 during the same year. Along with the fighting game Breakers from 1996, these two games are the only officially licensed Visco games to release on the Neo Geo AES platform during its original commercial run from 1990 - 2004. Although it was never originally ported to the Neo Geo CD, an officially endorsed conversion of the game by independent developer and publisher Neo Conception International (N.C.I.) was released for the console in 2012, which was part of an acquisition deal with Visco in regards to the rights of their intellectual properties. A Dreamcast version was released in August 2022. Columbus Circle & French based PixelHeart released an officially licensed reproduction on the Neo Geo AES platform available in both English and Japanese in 2020.

Andro Dunos was released as part of the VISCO Collection for the PlayStation 4/5, Xbox One/Series, Nintendo Switch and PC in October 2023.

== Reception ==
Reception

Review scores
Publication	Score
AllGame	2/5
Consoles +	45%
Electronic Gaming Monthly	24/40
GamePro	16/20
HobbyConsolas	88/100
Joypad	79%
Mega Fun	68%
Player One	90%
VideoGames & Computer Entertainment	5/10

In Japan, Game Machine listed Andro Dunos on their September 1, 1992 issue as being the twentieth most-popular arcade game at the time. The game received mixed reception from both critics and reviewers since its initial release in arcades and Neo Geo AES.
