= Pocket Bravery =

- Cover artwork
- Developer: Statera Studio
- Publishers: PQube, PixelHeart
- Director: Anderson Halfeld
- Producer: Jonathan Silva
- Designers: Ed Junior; Márcio Hypólito
- Programmers: Arthur Graña; Julio Centeno; Lucas X. C
- Artists: Allan "Natural"; Allyson Maciel; Edson "Benhazard"; Elias Vaz; Guilherme "Gaiden"; Verion Julian
- Writers: Jefferson Silva; Pedro Gomes
- Composers: Angelo Ceccatto; Douglas Rodrigues; Franklin Lisboa; João Paulo Oliveira; Luan Lucas
- Series: Bravery
- Engine: Unity
- Platforms: Windows; PlayStation 4 PlayStation 5 Xbox One; Xbox Series X/S; Nintendo Switch
- Release: PC: WW: August 31, 2023; PlayStation 4, PlayStation 5, Xbox One, Xbox Series X/S, Nintendo Switch: WW: April 10, 2025
- Genre: Fighting
- Modes: Single-player, multiplayer

Pocket Bravery is an indie fighting game developed by Brazilian company Statera Studios and published by PQube and PixelHeart. The game was created in pixel art inspired by the chibi aesthetic of the Super Gem Fighter Mini Mix game and the Neo Geo Pocket Color fighting games. And influenced by the retro 2D games like Street Fighter, Fatal Fury and The King of Fighters which it pays homage to. The game was announced in April 2020, and during its development there were several tests and even championships, in addition to two beta phases, a closed beta that started on August 10, 2023, exclusively for people who donated to the game, and an open beta in the following day. Pocket Bravery was released on August 31, 2023, and was later released for PlayStation 4, PlayStation 5, Nintendo Switch, Xbox One and Xbox Series X/S on April 10, 2025. The creation of Pocket Bravery was somewhat turbulent due to a lack of funding and distrust among the gaming community due to the controversies surrounding the game Trajes Fatais, on which producer Jonathan Silva had previously worked on. Despite the disbelief, the project managed to win over the public, raising funds that not only made its release possible, but also has continuous support for DLCs and updates.

== Gameplay ==
Nuno Alves, the protagonist of Pocket Bravery, fighting Shō Kamui from the Breakers series.

Pocket Bravery is an indie 2D pixel art fighting game, with four main button controls inspired by The King of Fighters, one for weak punch, one for strong punch, one for weak kick and one for strong kick. However, it also features Breaker system, originating from Breakers. And the additional buttons for, grab, and combo breaker and the optional ones, two for punch and two for kick and elemental. The game has four bars for each character, the uppermost gray bar is the stun bar that fills up as the character receives a hit; the health bar is the orange one and is the largest located further down, it decreases in each hit the character receives; the power bar that fills as the player keeps fighting, with this bar the character can do special attacks or cancel enemy special attacks; and finally the elemental bar, which fills like the power bar but takes longer and with it the character attacks with more strength and can make different moves such as canceling attacks and enemy combos. The grab command is executed by pressing the two weak attack buttons and the opponent can break away from the command by pressing the same buttons. Characters can also run, dash backward, do normal and long jumps. The game also offers simplified commands that help players with special needs. Each battle rewards the player with battle points (BP), which can be used to unlock new stages, new colors to customize characters, arts and even extra characters.

=== Game modes ===
Some of the many game modes of Pocket Bravery.

The game can be played in single player or two player mode offline and multiplayer online, the latter featuring rollback netcode. It has seven modes; story mode, arcade, combo factory, training mode, gallery, versus and online multiplayer.

== Plot ==
A strange phenomenon has taken over the world and few people are able to feel or manifest it. Some are able to release energetic powers through their hands, others tone their muscles, while others transfer their energy to objects and weapons. No one can understand the reason for all this and tries to unravel the mystery of this phenomenon. In the midst of this disturbance, a terrorist group called Pack steals artifacts and ancient relics from countless nations, causing chaos wherever they go. Nuno Alves, a former member of the Pack, opposes its leader Hector and ends up being brutally punished and thrown into a captivity called place Kennel. There he meets a man called Lobo with whom he creates an alliance and gets mentored by him, teaching him how to use the strange force known as Ichor that has taken over the world. Nuno and Lobo manage to escape from captivity and plan to take revenge on Hector. On this journey they meet Mingmei who is an agent of the Ghost Hat organization that aims to stop Nuno's tormentor and in this endeavor they meet and become friends with Sebastian and Hadassa who have goals similar to Nuno's, as well as the rest of the cast around the world.

== Characters ==
The game was launched with 13 playable characters at the start, with 3 of them being unlockable via cheat code or through specific objectives for each character. The game will also have 2 season passes that will be included via DLC. Characters in italics are unlockable, while those in bold are guest characters.

Base roster

- (Portugal) Nuno Alves
- (China) Mingmei Wong
- (Scotland) Sebastian McClane
- (Brazil) Hadassa Silva
- (Russia) Aleksander Arshavin
- (United States) Kimberly Moore
- (Nigeria) Ekon Ndidi
- (Japan) Daisuke Sato
- (India) Malika Sharma
- (Mexico) Ximena Guadalupe
- (Brazil) Hector Silva
- (Brazil) Jorge Chagas
- (Japan) **Sho Kamui**

DLC

**1st Season**

- (Australia) **Rick Johnson**
- (United States) Brandon Carter
- (N/A) Dvesha
- (France) Camille Leclerc

**2nd Season**

- (South Korea) Son Ji-Sung
- (Japan) **Shinji Arashi**
- (Italy) Filippo Baggio
- (Japan) **Moha**

Pocket Bravery has two confirmed seasons, others could come if it gets high demand. Sho Kamui from the fighting game Breakers is a guest character in partnership with PixelHeart. Rick Johnson, Shinji Arashi and Moha are the second, third and fourth guest characters who come from other Statera games, Guns N' Runs and Arashi Gaiden. Jorge Chagas is the only official character in the game who has no importance in Story Mode despite having a background plot. His moves are also based on famous characters from other fighting games such as Ralf Jones, Ryuji Yamazaki, Terry Bogard, Leona Heidern and Kim Kaphwan from The King of Fighters series in addition to Luke Sullivan and Guile from Street Fighter series. His theme "Goodbye Osasco" is a homage to Kyo Kusanagi's theme song "Goodbye Esaka" in The King of Fighters. Non-playable characters that appear in the game and are relevant to the plot are; Lobo, Sergei Arshavin, Arcano and Hiraku. Son Ji-Sung, who was originally meant to be included in the Season 1 Pass had his schedule moved to the Season 2 Pass, with his spot being filled by Nuno's doppelganger, Dvesha.

=== Season 1 DLC ===
The Season 1 DLC was released for PlayStation 4, PlayStation 5, Xbox One and Xbox Series X/S, followed by a Nintendo Switch release on March 10, 2026. The DLC introduces four new playable characters, each with their own unique stage, music track, Arcade Mode ending, color palettes, and unlockable items from the in-game shop. The four characters are Rick Johnson, an Australian gunslinger who uses plasma-based electric combat with nano-robot technology; Brandon Carter, an American former SEAL and CIA operative specializing in close-quarters combat; Dvesha, a shadowy entity created through Lobo's powers and the Scroll of Shadows, wielding shadow-based capoeira-inspired moves; and Camille Leclerc, a French punk-rock martial artist who uses sound-element attacks.

=== Season 2 DLC ===
The Season 2 DLC was announced for a staggered release on Steam, with characters being released one per week starting in April 2026, beginning with Son Ji-Sung. The console versions are planned to receive all Season 2 characters simultaneously at a later date. Filippo Baggio, one of the Season 2 characters, is voiced by community member Vitor Afonso.

== Development ==
The origin of Pocket Bravery was the disappointment with the development of the game Trajes Fatais. Jonathan Silva, the creator of the franchise had previously worked on the indie fighting game 'Trajes Fatais' from Onanim Studio and was also the publicity face for the project. He started working on the project in 2016 and in 2017 he was faced with a huge lack of money raised for the game's development. The studio ended up suffering from this financial shortage and this affected many members who ended up being dismissed. The studio's harmony was no longer the same and he decided to leave the project in 2020 but with his dream of creating a fighting game. Wanting to separate himself from the bad reputation he unfairly gained, he met Anderson Halfeld and they founded Brazilian developer Statera Studio. Initially they wanted to create the game Bravery which would be in the style of The King of Fighters XIII but would require a lot of manpower which they did not have at the time. They then decided to make a simpler (pocket) version of this initial project, taking inspiration from SVC Chaos: SNK vs. Capcom, Neo Geo Pocket's games and Pocket Fighter, with the visual part having a hint of Metal Slug and Scott Pilgrim. Thus, both Bravery and its pocket version are different projects of the same universe. Along with this, they wanted to bring back the nostalgia of the fighting game fever in the arcades of the 90s but bringing new elements giving the title its own originality. The studio was committed from the beginning to bringing transparency to the development of the project so that players can regain confidence their lost in Trajes Fatais. They started a funding campaign on Indiegogo bringing exclusive rewards to donors using an all-or-nothing format. If they did not achieve the goal in the estimated time, they would refund the money raised and the project would be ceased. The campaign offered several contribution options that led to different rewards: from the possibility of becoming a beta tester, obtaining a digital artbook and even creating a character for the game. The extended options also included a new game mode (Tag Strike), character color editing, a version for mobile devices and even new characters. The deadline coincided with the launch of the open beta version. From the beginning, they wanted to create a game that clearly showed the fundamentals for applying strikes, understanding why and how they work the way they do and how to link one strike into another. In addition, it also addressed the diversity of nationalities, so the Nigerian character Ndidi was created because Nigeria is one of the African countries with the largest fighting community of the continent. In November 2025, co-founder and director Anderson Halfeld stepped away from Statera Studio due to personal health reasons. Following his departure, long-time artist Ed Junior and programmer Erasmo Bellumat became partners in the studio, ensuring the continuation of the project and its planned content. A sequel, Pocket Bravery 2, was confirmed to be in development, retaining the pixel art style of the original while incorporating new characters and gameplay systems. Additionally, a Mega Drive version of Pocket Bravery was announced to be in development for collectors.

== Critical reception ==
Pocket Bravery received favored reviews, with GameBlast giving it an 8 out of 10, highly praising the number of single player modes, but complaining about the progress in Story Mode not being saved in the cloud. The website Round 1 praised the ease of gameplay and the educational way of teaching the game to be handled, also giving it an 8 out of 10 and emphasizing that the traditional controls seem somewhat "hard". Gamerview while also praising the gameplay also highlighted the considerable modes, despite saying that Hot Pursuit mode didn't add anything, and gave it a rating of 95 out of 100%. Siliconera gave it a 7 and praised the complexity of the cast, the fun modes and the help tools. Retrolike jointly praised the numerous modes and the pixel art but complained about the unbalanced characters, the issues in the hitbox and blocking of attacks, finishing with a rating of 7 out of 10. Hey Poor Player emphasized the beauty of the character design and praised the amount of content at the beginning without the need of an overpriced DLC and that despite the difficulty in some Story Mode sessions the game is formidable, giving it a 3.5 out of 5. Hardcoregamer expressed that the game is a tribute to classic fighting games while bringing a modern touch with various modes, options and extra content and the website Pizza Fria added that the game stands out in the saturated scene of the genre by standing out with its facets made with passion.

On aggregate review websites, the game holds a score of 75 out of 100 on OpenCritic, based on 16 critic reviews, and is recommended by 63% of critics. On Steam, the game has a "Very Positive" rating with 89% of user reviews being positive.

== Awards ==
Year	Award	Category	Results	Ref
2023	Brasil Game Awards	Brazilian Game of The Year	Won	
2023	Flow Games Awards	Brazilian Game of The Year	Won	
2023	The Game Awards 2023	Best Fighting Game	Nominated	
2024	27th Annual D.I.C.E. Awards	Fighting Game of the Year	Nominated	
