= Super Drift Out =

1995 video game

Super Drift Out: World Rally Championships
- Cover art
- Developer: Dragnet (programming)
- Publisher: Visco Corporation
- Composer: Kenji Yamazaki
- Series: Drift Out
- Platform: Super Famicom
- Release: JP: February 24, 1995
- Genre: Racing
- Mode: Single-player

Super Drift Out: World Rally Championships (スーパードリフトアウト) is a 1995 rallying video game developed by Dragnet and published by Visco Corporation for the Super Famicom. It is the third game in the Drift Out series, and was followed by Neo Drift Out: New Technology. It resembles the first Drift Out and is sometimes referred to as a port or remake.

All races in this game are based on the 1994 World Rally Championship season. Two types of background music ('normal' and 'hard' beats) and three racing levels (easy, normal, and hard) are available. The top six times are tracked in each of the rally legs, including the super special stage.

== Gameplay ==
The player (Impreza WRX) is racing along a dirt road at speeds up to 158 km/h in this rally racing event.

The player has to finish among the top six race car drivers at the end of each round. Failing to complete this task ends the game with premature elimination from the world rally. Licensed rally cars from around the world are included in the game. The only exception is the European edition of Ford Escort due to licensing issues; rally races never use the North American model. As a result, the Ford Escort RS Cosworth featured in the game was renamed the "Tord Ecorst"; as with the previous Drift Out '94: The Hard Order.

The first level is intended for new players. After beating this level, the player is told to try a harder level and views the closing credits. Normal games start at the second level, but the player does not have to deal with the consequences of crashing the vehicle until the third level. Crashing the car sends the player back to the start, where the time is reset for another chance (and all damage to the vehicle is fixed). After beating the most difficult level of the game, the full credits are played.

All three levels can be used in either world rally mode or time trial mode. Target times are reduced when a harder level of difficulty is introduced.

== Reception ==
On release, Famicom Tsūshin scored the game a 23 out of 40.

== See also ==
- Neo Drift Out: New Technology
