= Bass Rush: ECOGEAR PowerWorm Championship =

2000 video game

- Developer: Visco Corporation
- Publisher: Visco Corporation
- Platforms: Dreamcast, Nintendo 64
- Release: Nintendo 64: JP: April 28, 2000; Dreamcast: JP: December 21, 2000
- Genre: Fishing
- Mode: Single-player

Bass Rush: ECOGEAR PowerWorm Championship is a fishing video game by Visco Corporation for the Dreamcast and Nintendo 64, released in 2000 in Japan.

== Gameplay ==
Bass Rush: ECOGEAR PowerWorm Championship is a bass fishing game with 6 real lakes, more than 10 types of fish, and 124 types of both hard and soft lures, and virtual tournaments were held on the Internet with monthly rankings to allow players to compete in real time, and collect points for catching fish in mini-games. The game utilized the VMU memory card and fishing controller. The game featured two playable characters, a man and a woman.

The gameplay has been described as more realistic compared to Sega Bass Fishing.

== Development and release ==
It was released in April 2000 for Nintendo 64, and an upgraded version called Bass Rush Dream was released in December 2000 on Dreamcast.

== Reception ==
Eric Bratcher reviewed the Dreamcast version of the game for Next Generation, rating it one star out of five, and stated that "we love fishing games, but we can't think of a single reason to own this one." He also called the game "boring" and was critical of animation and the environments.

In Japan, Dreamcast Magazine rated the game at 67%, Famitsu rated it at 65%, and Dorimaga rated it at 82%.
