= Super Baseball 2020 =

1991 video game

- Arcade flyer
- Developer: Pallas (Note: Ported to Super NES by Monolith Corp. and to Genesis by NuFX.)
- Publishers: SNK: Genesis/Mega Drive; NA/EU: Electronic Arts; JP: Electronic Arts Victor Super NES; JP: K Amusement Leasing; NA: Tradewest
- Composers: Toshikazu Tanaka; Yasuo Yamate; Yasumada Yamada; Toshio Shimizu
- Platforms: Arcade, Neo Geo AES, Neo Geo CD, Genesis/Mega Drive, Super NES
- Release: September 20, 1991: Arcade; JP: September 20, 1991 Neo Geo AES; NA/JP: October 25, 1991 Super NES; JP: March 12, 1993; NA: July 1993 Genesis/Mega Drive; NA/EU: September 1993; JP: March 4, 1994 Neo Geo CD; JP: February 25, 1995; NA: October 1996
- Genre: Sports
- Modes: Single-player, multiplayer
- Arcade system: Neo Geo MVS

Super Baseball 2020 (Note: Also known as 2020 Super Baseball (Note: Japanese: ２０２０年スーパー・ベースボール, Hepburn: 2020-Nen Sūpā Bēsubōru) in Japan.) is a 1991 baseball video game developed by Pallas and published by SNK for the Neo Geo arcade and home platforms. It was ported to the Neo Geo AES console a month after its release, followed by ports for the Sega Genesis and Super Nintendo Entertainment System in 1993. The North American Genesis and European Mega Drive versions feature a package illustration by Electronic Arts artist Marc Ericksen.

The gameplay and rules build upon its predecessors Baseball Stars Professional and Baseball Stars with futuristic upgrades befitting of the year 2020 AD, including robot players and technological upgrades for the humans, including powerful armor, computer sensors, jet-packs.

== Gameplay ==
Gameplay screenshot from the original Neo Geo version.

In addition to the futuristic characters, the field has been jazzed up in the form of Cyber Egg Stadium. The bleachers are covered by glass so beyond the playing surface, it's as if the spectators are sitting under an elevated portion of the field. To balance the overly powerful hitters, the only opening for home-runs is in dead center. Foul territory has been reduced to the area behind first base, home and third base, not extending past the second-based lines into the outfield increasing the opportunities for hits.

New on-field features include stop zones near first and third bases that cause a batted ball to stop dead, jump zones that give an acrobatic boosts to fielders (located in front of the home run window on the Super SNES version). On all releases except the Super SNES version, landmines called crackers are thrown on the field to inhibit the defence.

=== Players ===
In line with the Baseball Stars series, this game includes male and female characters, with the addition of robots. All three types of players have the same basic abilities and vary by their personal strengths. Robot players can blow up (or lose all their power) if they are worked too hard during a game, by constantly diving for the ball, running extra bases, or getting hit by a pitch. Under no stress whatsoever, some robots, especially pitchers, will naturally run out of power as the game progresses. When this happens, they will lose all their abilities and become useless. When that occurs, the manager can either power them up or replace them with another player on the roster. Human players do not blow up, but human pitchers can tire out. leading them to pant heavily and throw the ball very slowly. This can be remedied by either an upgrade or, as in real baseball, switching to a relief pitcher.

=== Powering up ===
A distinguishing feature of Super Baseball 2020 and its predecessors is the ability to power-up any character. During the game, players can earn money doing certain things, ranging from throwing a strike ($100) to hitting a grand slam ($10,000), or lose money for being put out [$100]. Money does not carry over to the next match, but can be spent at any time during the game to upgrade the hitting, fielding or pitching of human players of human players, to upgrade a robot's model, or to convert a human to a glowing robot. Upgrades are categorized as levels A, B and C, with their own costs and percentage increases. Similar to the money, the upgrades do not carry over to the next match, and players that explode or power down effectively lose their abilities but can remain in the game to stand around.

- ^{a} In the Super NES version, the amount received is the amount if the base stealing from was taken. Stealing second awards $300 (like a single), stealing third awards $500 (double), stealing home awards $800 (triple).

=== Limitations ===
- There is no infield fly rule in this game, which can be used to the advantage of a defender if there are base runners. Double plays and even triple plays are common because of this.
- A base runner cannot begin to steal bases until the pitcher has released the ball. In most baseball video games and in real life, a runner can begin to steal the next base at any time. However, stealing a base beforehand can only be done if the steal button is continuously pressed right after the screen cuts-back after the batter hit a foul ball, and the pitcher will not even notice the player running.
- The third baseman, second baseman, and first baseman will not leave the base to retrieve a ball. They will instead stand on the base and wait for another fielder to get the ball, which can sometimes mean they will stand there while the ball rolls inches away from them. The only exception would be if the shortstop covers third or second base for the fielder; then they remain in the stationary position.
- Since the game has semi-automatic fielding, the player cannot change which defensive player they want to run after the ball, meaning sometimes the pitcher will end up chasing a ball well into the outfield.
- If a ball is hit far enough into the stands, it can sometimes become stuck, allowing the batter to garnish an inside-the-park home run. Because of the reduced home run zone, faster players can often round the bases by hitting the ball up into the fair-zone stands.
- The computer players will always attempt to hit the ball straight, as if trying to hit a home run, no matter what the strength of the batter, which can give an advantage to the human operator of the game.
- It is not possible to play against a team from the other league except in League mode, where if the player's team wins the pennant, they advance to a one-game championship against the winner of the other league's pennant. In the SNES version the final game is against the secret team The Cosmopolitan Monolis who wear gold and black uniforms and have Nazi related names like V-2, Himmler, Tojoe and Goebbels.
- If more than 100 runs are scored, the player's score will turn back to zero, as there are only two spaces for your runs. Consequently, if the player scores 101 runs, and their opponent scores two runs, the player will lose the game 01–02.
- Players cannot change positions in the field or line up without replacing them.
- If another player is in the player's line of path to throw the ball, they will catch the ball after it is thrown. This means that if the shortstop retrieves a ground ball just behind third base, then the throw will get cut off by the third baseman and then the pitcher before the ball gets to first base. The pitcher will almost always get in the way, and this can present a problem when trying to pull a double play between third and first or second and home.
- If a base runner has touched a base they can not go back to their original base in order not to get forced out.

== Reception ==
Reception

Aggregate score
Aggregator	Score
GameRankings	60% (Neo Geo); 63% (Genesis); 74% (SNES)

Review score
Publication	Score
AllGame	3/5 (Neo Geo AES)

RePlay reported Super Baseball 2020 to be the third most popular arcade game of October 1991. In Japan, Game Machine listed it as the ninth most successful table arcade unit of that month.

On release, Famicom Tsūshin scored the Neo Geo version of the game a 24 out of 40.

In a retrospective review, Allgame editor Kyle Knight described the Neo Geo AES version of Super Baseball 2020 as "a lot of fun to play and a refreshing take on the game of baseball".
