= Ashura Blaster =

1990 video game

- Japanese arcade flyer
- Developer: Visco
- Publisher: Taito
- Platform: Arcade
- Release: 1990
- Genre: Shooter game
- Modes: Single-player, multiplayer
- Arcade system: Taito B System hardware

Ashura Blaster (阿修羅ブラスター) is a 1990 vertically scrolling shoot 'em up developed by Visco and published by Taito for arcades. The player controls a helicopter (selecting 1 of 4 bomb configurations) and shoots enemies in the air and ground, collects power-ups, and defeats bosses to advance levels.

== Reception ==
CU Amiga gave it 65% and said "It's straight ahead two-player vertical blasting without frills."

Zero said "all in all I found it rather uninspiring. Save your dosh."

Speciale Annuario Videogiochi '91 said it was very similar to previous helicopter games.

Joystick said it was a rehash with little innovation.
