= Visco Corporation =

Japanese video game developer

- Type: Public
- Industry: Video games slot machines
- Founded: 1982; 44 years ago
- Headquarters: Japan
- Website: http://www.visco.co.jp/

Visco Corporation (株式会社ビスコ) is a Japanese video game developer. They originally developed video games for several platforms from the arcades and NES, to the Nintendo 64 and Neo Geo in the past. Alongside Toaplan and other developers, Visco was closely associated with Taito, who released their games without any credit; Visco eventually bought back the rights to every game they had developed.

== History ==
Visco was founded in 1982 by Tetsuo Akiyama (秋山 哲雄, Akiyama Tetsuo) and later became corporate on August 8, 1983, while revealing itself as "Visco" in Japan.

The company teamed up with Seta and Sammy in developing arcade games powered by the SSV (Sammy, Seta and Visco) arcade system board until Sammy fully acquired noted game company Sega under a new company titled Sega Sammy Holdings in 2004, while Seta's parent company Aruze announced in December 2008 that Seta decided to close their doors after 23 years of existence. Therefore, the SSV board was no longer being produced. From 2008, Visco began manufacturing slot machines for casinos mostly in southeast Asian regions.

== Games released ==
Title	Platform(s)	Release year	Note(s)
Andro Dunos	Neo Geo (MVS & AES)	1992	
Ashura Blaster	Arcade	1990	Game developed by Visco for Taito.
Asuka & Asuka	Arcade	1988	Game developed by Visco for Taito.
Bang Bang Busters	Neo Geo (MVS & AES), Neo Geo CD	2000 (prototype)	Unreleased prototype released in 2010.
Bang Bead	Neo Geo MVS	2000	
Bass Rush: ECOGEAR PowerWorm Championship	Nintendo 64, Sega Dreamcast	2000	
Battle Flip Shot	Neo Geo MVS	1997	
Blocken	Arcade	1994	Game developed by KID.
Breakers	Neo Geo (MVS & AES), Neo Geo CD	1996	
Breakers Revenge	Neo Geo MVS	1998	An updated version of Breakers.
Caliber .50	Sega Mega Drive	1991	A Sega Mega Drive port of the same name, made by SETA Corporation for Arcade in 1989.
Captain Tomaday	Neo Geo MVS	1999	
Chiki Chiki Boys	Sega Mega Drive	1992	A Sega Mega Drive port of Mega Twins, made by Capcom for Arcade in 1990.
Cowboy Kid	NES	1991	1) Game developed by Pixel. 2) Is known in Japan as Western Kids.
Crystal Legacy	Neo Geo MVS	1994 (prototype)	1) Also known as Tenrin no Syo Chicago. 2) Game and title of origin of Breakers.
Drift Out	Arcade	1991	
Drift Out '94: The Hard Order	Arcade	1994	
Galmedes	Arcade	1992	
Ganryu	Neo Geo MVS	1999	Also known as Musashi Ganryuki.
Goal! Goal! Goal!	Neo Geo (MVS & AES)	1995	
Great Boxing: Rush Up	NES	1990	Game published in North America by Romstar as World Champ.
Maze of Flott	Arcade	1989	Game developed by Taito.
Neo Drift Out: New Technology	Neo Geo (MVS & AES), Neo Geo CD	1996	
Neo Mr. Do!	Neo Geo (MVS & AES)	1996	Game released on license from Universal.
Panic Road	Arcade	1986	Game co-developed with Seibu Kaihatsu.
Pop'n Bounce	Neo Geo MVS	1997	Developed by Video System.
Puzzle De Pon!	Neo Geo MVS	1995	Game released on license from Taito.
Puzzle De Pon! R	Neo Geo MVS	1997	Game released on license from Taito.
Puzzlekko Club	Neo Geo MVS	1994 (prototype)	
Rally Bike	NES	1990	Game developed by Toaplan.
Stagger I	Arcade	1998	Game developed by Afega.
Storm Blade	Arcade	1996	
Super Drift Out	Super Famicom	1995	
Thunder & Lightning	Arcade, NES	1990	Game developed by SETA.
Thunder & Lightning 2	Arcade	1992	The only sequel to Thunder & Lightning, known in Japan as Block Carnival.
U.N. Defense Force: Earth Joker	Arcade	1993	
Vasara	Arcade	2000	
Vasara 2	Arcade	2001	
Vivid Dolls	Aleck 64 Arcade System	1998	Eroge developed by Visco. Published by SETA. Similar to Qix.
Wardner	Sega Mega Drive	1990	The Sega Mega Drive port of the game is known as Wardner no Mori Special in Japan.
