= Puzzle de Pon! =

1995 video game

- Developers: Visco Corporation; Taito
- Publisher: SNK
- Director: Don Gabacho
- Producer: Tetsuo Akiyama
- Designers: Hos Kuro; E‑Ayasu; Tajiman
- Programmer: Isao Teramachi
- Composer: Kenichi Kamio
- Platform: Arcade
- Release: JP: 28 November 1995; NA: November 1995
- Genre: Puzzle
- Modes: Single-player, multiplayer
- Arcade system: Neo Geo MVS

Puzzle de Pon! (Note: Japanese: パズルdeポン!, Hepburn: Pazuru de Pon!) is a puzzle video game made by Visco Corporation in 1995. It was initially released for the Neo Geo arcade platform.

The name Puzzle de Pon! is derived from the animations of bubbles popping in the original Bubble Bobble videogame, where a little onomatopoeic animation (through Japanese pronunciation) saying "Pon!" would appear once a bubble was popped.

== Gameplay ==
Gameplay screenshot

The game plays similarly to the Puzzle Bobble series, with the game's concept being used under license from Taito. There are some gameplay differences however. Although the player clears the colored balls on the screen by firing balls against other balls of the same colour, the objective of the game is not to clear the screen of balls. It is instead to clear all the balls from around the level shape, referred to as the "drop token". Once this shape is freed, it explodes and the player travels onto the next level.

There are 39 levels in the game, divided in groups of three levels. In the first two levels, the shape is something generic; in the third level the shape is a Zodiac sign, up to level 36 (since there are 12 signs). Level 39's shape is the Sun sign (U+2609 ☉ SUN). Once you beat the game, it is stated that you became the Sun God, and the ending shows your character riding the Sun Chariot in the sky.

Levels in this style were later adopted by the Puzzle Bobble series.

== Legacy ==
In 1997, a sequel to Puzzle De Pon! was released for the Neo Geo MVS system, entitled Puzzle De Pon! R!. The game concept is the same, but it has different stages.
