= Ganryu (video game) =

1999 video game

- Developer: Visco Corporation
- Publisher: Visco Corporation; Arcade: NA/EU: SNK; JoshProd (Neo Geo AES); RushOnGame (Dreamcast)
- Producer: Ume.W
- Programmer: Seiji Kawakatsu
- Artists: Fujimi Ōnishi; T. Nakahata; T. Nakazawa
- Composer: Yasuko Yamada
- Platforms: Arcade; Dreamcast; Neo Geo AES
- Release: Arcade: WW: 1999; Neo Geo AES: WW: June 2016; Dreamcast: WW: 30 September 2017
- Genres: Action, hack and slash, platform
- Modes: Single-player, multiplayer
- Arcade system: Neo Geo MVS

Ganryu (Note: Also known as Musashi Ganryuki (Japanese: 武蔵巌流記, Hepburn: Musashi Ganryū-ki; lit. Musashi Ganryu Tale) in Japan.) is a 1999 side-scrolling hack and slash action-platform arcade video game developed and originally published by Visco Corporation exclusively for the Neo Geo MVS. It is loosely based upon the battle of Japanese swordsman Miyamoto Musashi on the island of Ganryū-jima against Sasaki Kojirō, who is also known as Sasaki Ganryū, hence the reasons for the abbreviated name of the game. In the game, players assume the role of either Musashi or Suzume on a journey to defeat a resurrected Kojirō and his legion of evil ninjas and monsters terrorizing Kyoto. A sequel, titled Ganryu 2: Hakuma Kojiro, was developed Storybird Studio and published by Just for Games and PixelHeart. It was released in April 2022 to generally mixed reception.

== Gameplay ==
Gameplay screenshot showcasing Yasha-hime, the first boss of the game.

Ganryu is a side-scrolling hack and slash action-platform game similar to Shinobi and Strider where the players take control of either Miyamoto Musashi or Suzume through five stages set in Japan, where the main objective is to rescue Otsu from an evil clan of ninja servants led by a resurrected Sasaki Kojirō, the main antagonist of the game, along with one of his creations that act as a boss at the end of the stage in order to progress further through the game. Each of the two playable characters have their own advantages and disadvantages that comes into effect during gameplay, with Musashi being the strongest but least agile while Suzume is the most versatile but least strongest respectively. In addition to the regular single-player campaign, there is also an alternating two player mode, where two people can play through the game by taking turns after one of the players die.

All of the levels featured in the game, although linear in nature, are large and populated with obstacles and enemies which involve the players on traversing them by jumping and running while slashing and dodging enemies that roam around the playfield. The stages also feature multiple hidden rooms and routes to explore, encouraging the player with exploring them in order to find hostages that grants various rewards for the effort, such as onigiri or takoyaki which restores health, or ryō currency to receive extra points. Items and additional sub-weapons are also scattered in treasure chests across the stage to be collected. If players sustain too much damage, their player character is killed after the health bar is completely depleted and respawns on a checkpoint location but once all lives are lost, the game is over unless the player insert more credits into the arcade machine to continue playing. If a memory card is present, the players are allowed to save their progress and resume into the last stage the game saved at.

Controlling the characters is done with a joystick, which moves them left and right. Attacking enemies is performed by pressing the A button, while B makes the character jump and C activates a grappling hook that allow players to pull forward, swing onto the latched object as well as attack enemies at a distance. Players can also perform a jump kick move with the B button that not only attack enemies, but allows their character to climb walls. By holding A, players can unleash a powerful attack against enemies after charging, but it leaves them exposed to enemy attack.

== Plot ==
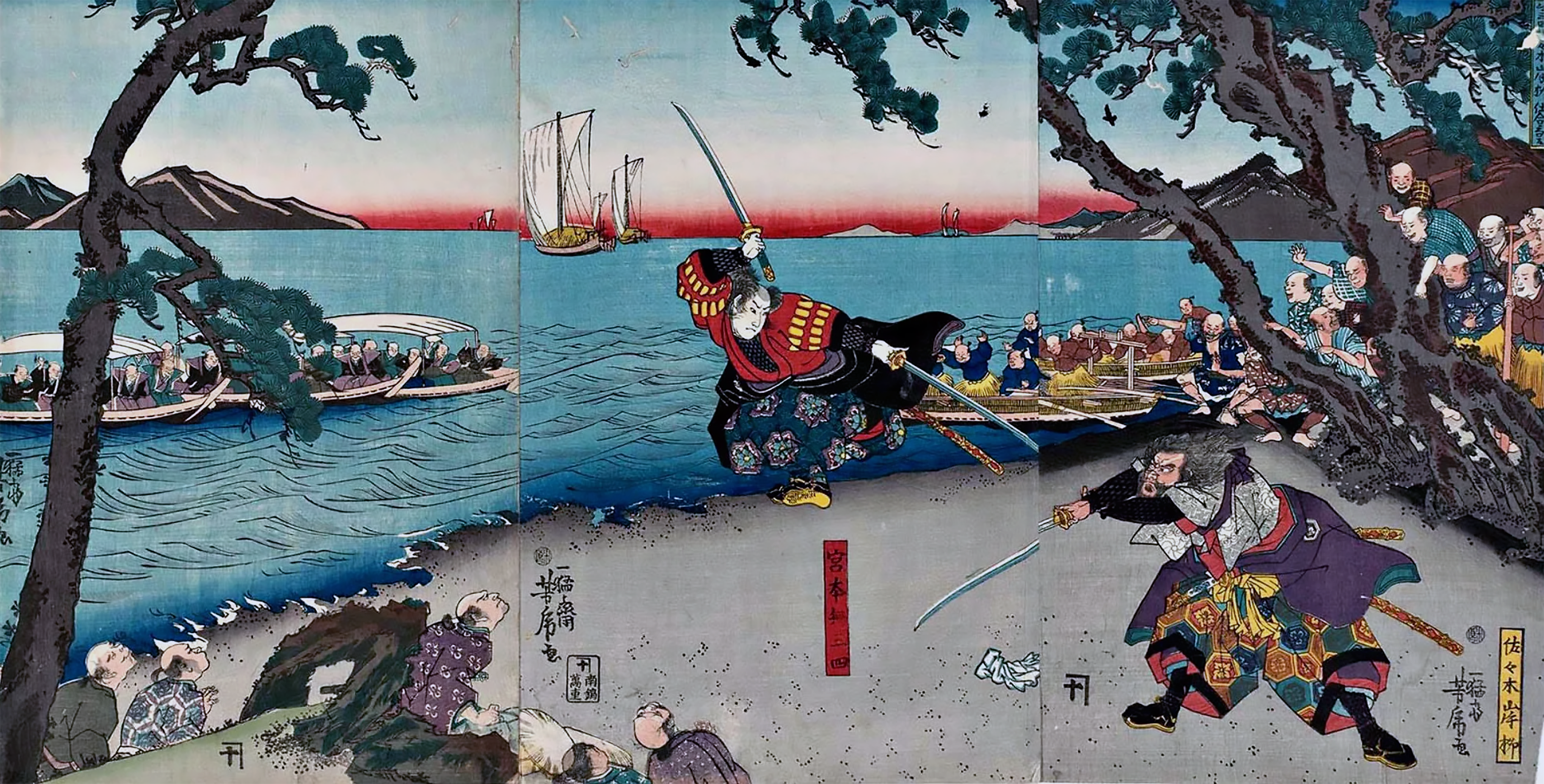
The illustrated battle between Musashi Miyamoto (left) and Sasaki Kojirō (right) on the shores of Ganryū-jima island.

On April 14, 1612, Miyamoto Musashi fought a duel against fencer Sasaki "Ganryū" Kojirō in the shores of Ganryū-jima island using a bokken carved from an oar but prior to the battle, Musashi saw a glimpse of the lengthy ōdachi under possession of Kojirō and proceeded in making a wooden sword of greater length compared to his rival. Musashi eventually emerged victorious from the short fight after striking Kojirō on his forehead that left him fatally wounded on the sand, with the former departing from the location without finishing in killing the latter, proving his point and ultimate goal of defeating him to detractors who called Musashi a coward for the act towards his rival.

A month has passed since the defeat of Kojirō at the hands of Musashi, who is planning to meet in Kyoto with his love, Otsu, who is joined by her young sister Suzume, a kunoichi from the Iga clan. During this period, a series of kidnappings are occurring in Kyoto at the hands of a mysterious and sinister ninja clan. Before Musashi arrived the city, Otsu was kidnapped by the ninja clan while Suzume was momentarily out, which prompts Musashi and Suzume to form a team in order to rescue Otsu and the kidnapped citizens from the clan.

On their venture, the duo faces a number of ninjas as well as monsters and eventually find the author responsible for all the occurring kidnappings in Kyoto; Sasaki "Ganryū" Kojirō, who has a scar on his forehead and had risen from death reincarnating as a vengeful demonic demigod embedded with rage and evil known as Chaos, obtaining a power far beyond his imaginations and challenges both Musashi and Suzume to a final duel in Ganryū-jima. Due to their mutual love towards Otsu, Musashi and Suzume confront Chaos in an arduous fight, which results in the evil demigod being destroyed once and for all, with the duo finally reuniting with Otsu. Musashi and Otsu eventually married, while Suzume assumes the role of her sister in the Iga clan as a priestess.

== Development and release ==
Ganryu was previewed in a 1998 issue of video game magazine Neo Geo Freak alongside other then-upcoming titles from Visco Corporation for the Neo Geo MVS such as Battle Flip Shot and Captain Tomaday, featuring different visuals compared with the final release in 1999. Although it was never originally ported to the Neo Geo AES, an officially endorsed conversion of the game by independent developer and publisher JoshProd was released for the console in June 2016. A year later, an officially licensed emulated port by Visco for the Dreamcast was also released by JoshProd and RushOnGame worldwide on September 30.

Ganryu was released as part of the VISCO Collection for the PlayStation 4/5, Xbox One/Series, Nintendo Switch and PC in October 2023.
