= Goal! Goal! Goal! =

1995 video game

- Developer: Visco Corporation
- Publisher: SNK
- Director: Don Gabacho
- Producer: Tetsuo Akiyama
- Programmer: N. Yamaguchi
- Artists: E‑Ayasu; H. Maehara; H. Mawatari
- Composer: Act Japan
- Platform: Arcade
- Release: WW: 1995
- Genre: Sports
- Modes: Single-player, multiplayer
- Arcade system: Neo Geo MVS

Goal! Goal! Goal! (Note: Japanese: ゴール！ゴール！ゴール！, Hepburn: Gōru! Gōru! Gōru!) is a football/soccer video game developed by Visco and published by SNK in 1995 for the Neo-Geo console.

== Gameplay ==
Gameplay screenshot showcasing a match between America and Switzerland.

The game represents a simplified football/soccer World cup, which consists of eliminating 7 teams to win the final victory. The first 3 are announced simulating a group stage prior to the direct elimination stage. The other 4, as part of that stage. In that second stage, all the classified selections are shown and which are advancing and which are staying along the way.

Each match lasts 2 minutes, stopping the time each time the ball is not in play, contrary to the official rules of this sport. When the clock reaches zero, there will be 12 extra seconds not shown on the screen, as injury time.

As in many football/soccer games that are not simulators, in case of draw is needed to continue with an additional credit, and then decide whether to repeat the game or opt for a penalty shootout.

=== Teams ===
The game presents 28 national teams, which have 3 characteristics that differentiate them from each other, which are shown when choosing each one: Shooting, Defense and Speed. The countries represented are, in order of position on the selection screen:

America*	Mexico	Colombia	Bolivia	Netherlands	Belgium	Ireland
Spain	Morocco	Brazil	Argentina	Germany	Switzerland	Nigeria
Italy	Cameroon	Norway	Sweden	Bulgaria	Romania	Greece
Saudi Arabia	Russia	Korea*	Japan	France	England	Uruguay

- America refers to the United States, while Korea refers to South Korea.

=== Formations ===
There are 6 types of formations to choose from, and the chosen one cannot be changed throughout the game. They appear as follows on the screen:

4-4-2	3-4-3
4-2-4	5-3-2
4-3-3	3-5-2

== Development and release ==
Goal! Goal! Goal! was developed by Visco and edited by SNK. It was released in 1995 for the Neo-Geo console. Visco Corporation was based in Kyoto, Japan and has partnered with the NES, Super Nintendo, and Nintendo 64.

== Reception ==
Reception

Review score
Publication	Score
AllGame	3.5/5

AllGame's Kyle Knight gave an overall positive review of Goal! Goal! Goal!.
