= Tecmo World Soccer '96 =

1996 video game

- Developer: Tecmo
- Publisher: SNK
- Directors: Akihiko Shimoji; Toshihiko Kodama
- Designer: Masao Akama
- Programmer: Yoshihiro Kinjyo
- Artist: Chitose Sasaki
- Composers: Hideyuki Suzuki; Shigekiyo Okuda; Takashi Kanai
- Series: Tecmo World Cup
- Platform: Arcade
- Release: WW: 1996
- Genre: Sports
- Modes: Single-player; Multiplayer
- Arcade system: Neo Geo MVS

Tecmo World Soccer '96 (Note: Japanese: テクモワールドサッカー '96, Hepburn: Tekumo Wārudo Sakkā' 96) is an association football video game developed by Tecmo and published by SNK for the Neo Geo in 1996. It is the ninth title in the Tecmo World Cup series overall, and the only title released for the Neo Geo platform.

== Gameplay ==
Gameplay screenshot showcasing a match between Italy and Japan.

The game takes place in the World Cup. The player can choose from 32 national teams. The tournament includes 7 games, divided into two groups of four teams and one final. Being an Arcade game, if it is lost only once, it will not be possible to continue playing. In case of a tie, the game is defined by a penalty shoot-out.

As for the gameplay, the novelty is the cross pass button and the possibility of giving a pass forward to a teammate; but the player cannot handle passes in the player's direction. Another novelty is to boost the player's speed through a dribble to reach the rival area and make a powerful shot.

In case of losing, the game can be repeated using the option to continue, in which it is possible to increase the strength or speed of the team up to a maximum of three times.

== Reception ==
Reception

Review scores
Publication	Score
AllGame	(AC) 1.5/5
M! Games	(NG) 42%
Mega Fun	(NG) 62%
Super Game Power	(NG) 3.8/5.0

Tecmo World Soccer '96 received mixed reception from critics since its release. AllGame's Kyle Knight criticized the visuals, audio, controls and other design aspects, stating that "The Neo Geo has more than its fair share of soccer games, and any one of them would be a better choice than Tecmo World Soccer '96." MAN!AC's Andreas Knauf compared the game with Super Sidekicks, criticizing the audiovisual presentation and lack of innovations, regarding it as a "Insignificant soccer game". Mega Fun's Ulf Schneider felt mixed in regard to the graphics and sound as well as other aspects. Brazilian magazine Super Game Power also compared the title with Super Sidekicks but commended its visuals, sound, controls and fun factor.
