= Pop'n Bounce =

1997 video game

- Arcade flyer
- Developer: Video System
- Publisher: Visco
- Platform: Arcade
- Release: 1997
- Genre: Block breaker
- Modes: Single-player, multiplayer
- Arcade system: Neo Geo MVS

Pop'n Bounce, released in Japan as Gapporin (Note: Japanese: ガッポリン, Hepburn: Gapporin), is a 1997 block breaker video game developed by Video System and published by Visco for the Neo Geo arcade platform. It was released in 1997.

Hamster Corporation acquired the game's rights alongside Video System's catalogue, re-releasing the game as part of their ACA Neo Geo series for the Nintendo Switch and PlayStation 4 in March 2026, the series' first game after a 7-year hiatus, after SNK unprecedentedly added the game into the ACA Neo Geo Selection Vol. 10 collection, which traditionally only adds SNK-owned games.

== Gameplay ==
The player aims to defeat numerous creatures on the screen using a paddle and ball in a similar manner to Taito's Arkanoid. Unlike other games in the genre, each creature has unique attributes, such as eggs that protect dragons inside for one hit, black creatures which cannot be defeated easily without a bomb and two creatures merging into one large creature. which allow the player to gain more points when defeated. Power-ups drop from defeated creatures, including a power-up that allows the paddle to periodically shoot an enemy in front of them. Indestructible walls provide additional challenge. When all six letters in the word "attack" are collected, the ball splits into three, allowing them to hit more creatures. One of the creatures is the main character from Rabio Lepus.
