= Stakes Winner =

1995 video game

- Arcade flyer
- Developer: Saurus
- Publisher: SNK
- Platforms: Arcade, Neo Geo AES, Neo Geo CD
- Release: JP: September 27, 1995; NA: September 1995
- Genres: Racing, sports
- Modes: Single-player, multiplayer
- Arcade system: Neo Geo MVS

Stakes Winner (Note: Also known as Stakes Winner: GI Road to Complete Conquest (Japanese: ステークスウィナー: ＧＩ完全制覇への道, Hepburn: Sutēkusu U~inā: GI Kanzen Seiha E no Michi) in Japan) is a 1995 horse racing video game developed by Saurus and published by SNK for the Neo Geo arcade and home platforms. In the game, players compete with either AI-controlled opponents or against other human players across multiple races. It was re-released through download services for various consoles. It was received with mixed reception from critics and reviewers since its initial release. In 1996, a sequel titled Stakes Winner 2 was released for the arcades.

== Gameplay ==
Arcade version screenshot

Stakes Winner is a thoroughbred horse racing game similar to Winning Post, where players take control of any of the available horses, each with their own strengths and weaknesses, to compete against either AI opponents or other human players across multiple races. Players control their horse with the joystick while two action buttons are used; one controlling the reins for small accelerations that drains little portions of the horse's stamina and another for the whip for fast speed, which drastically consumes stamina from the horse and if the stamina is depleted completely, racing is given up for a short period. Two quick taps on the joystick at any direction allows the horse to push back an opponent in front of them, however two quick taps on the opposite side reduces speed. Power-ups also spawn on the race track for players to pick up. Failing to qualify for the next race results in a game over screen unless players insert more credits into the arcade machine to continue playing.

== Development and release ==
Stakes Winner was developed by Saurus, with additional support from AM Factory, and the project was first announced in mid-1995 across Japanese publications such as Neo Geo Freak, with previews showcasing various differences compared to the final release. The game was first released by SNK for the Neo Geo MVS on September 27, 1995 and was then published for Neo Geo AES on October 27 of the same year. The North American AES release has since become one of the more expensive titles on the platform, with copies fetching over US$4000 on the secondary video game collecting market. The game was later re-released by Saurus for the Neo Geo CD and released only in Japan on March 22, 1996. The title was later ported by Saurus to the PlayStation and Sega Saturn, both of which were released on December 6, 1996. It has since received multiple re-releases in recent years on various digital distribution platforms such as the Virtual Console, Nintendo eShop, PlayStation Network and Xbox Live.

== Reception ==
Reception

Review scores
Publication	Score
AllGame	(Neo Geo) 1.5/5
Famitsu	(Saturn) 60 / 100
Nintendo Life	(Switch) 7/10
Dengeki PlayStation	(PS) 65/100, 70/100
Sega Saturn Magazine (JP)	(Saturn) 6.33 / 10

Stakes Winner was met with mixed reception from critics and reviewers since its release. In Japan, Game Machine listed it on their November 1, 1995 issue as being the fourth most-successful arcade game of the month, outperforming titles such as Puzzle Bobble 2, Virtua Striker and Street Fighter Alpha.

== Sequel ==
A sequel, Stakes Winner 2 was released in 1996 for the arcades, Neo Geo AES, PlayStation and Sega Saturn. It was later re-released in recent years for the Virtual Console, PlayStation Network, Nintendo eShop and Xbox Live.
