= Stakes Winner 2 =

1996 video game

- Developer: Saurus (Note: Additional work by System Vision.)
- Publisher: SNK
- Producers: Nobuyuki Tanaka; Takahiro Shima
- Designer: Hajime Yasuhara
- Programmer: Takuya Kawamura
- Artists: Chigusa Yokoyama; Hiroaki Fujimoto; Miso Suzuki
- Composers: Hiromu Sasaki; Hiroyuki Takei; Shuichi Kurosawa
- Series: Stakes Winner
- Platforms: Arcade, Neo Geo AES, Saturn, PlayStation
- Release: Arcade: JP: September 24, 1996; Neo Geo: JP: December 13, 1996; Saturn: JP: May 2, 1997; PlayStation: JP: May 9, 1997
- Genres: Racing, sports
- Modes: Single-player, multiplayer
- Arcade system: Neo Geo MVS

Stakes Winner 2 (Note: Also known as Stakes Winner 2: The Strongest Horse Legend (Japanese: ステークスウィナー２: 最強馬伝説, Hepburn: Sutēkusu U~inā: 2 Saikyō-ba Densetsu) in Japan.) is a horse racing video game developed by Saurus and published by SNK for the Neo Geo arcade and home platforms. It is the sequel to Stakes Winner, which was released earlier in 1995 on multiple platforms. In the game, players compete with either AI-controlled opponents or against other human players across multiple races. It was re-released through download services for various consoles. Like its predecessor, it was received with mixed reception from critics and reviewers since its initial release. A third entry, Stakes Winner 3, was rumored to be in development but never released.

== Gameplay ==
Arcade version screenshot

Stakes Winner 2 is a thoroughbred horse racing game similar to its predecessor, where players take control of any of the available horses, each with their own strengths and weaknesses, to compete against either AI opponents or other human players across multiple races.

Players control their horse with the joystick while two action buttons are used; one controlling the reins for small accelerations that drains little portions of the horse's stamina and another for the whip for fast speed, which drastically consumes stamina from the horse and if the stamina is depleted completely, racing is given up for a short period. Two quick taps on the joystick at any direction allows the horse to push back an opponent in front of them, but two quick taps on the opposite side reduces speed. Power-ups also spawn on the race track for players to pick up. Failing to qualify for the next race results in a game over screen unless players insert more credits into the arcade machine to continue playing.

== Development and release ==
Stakes Winner 2 was developed by Saurus, with additional support from System Vision. The game was first released by SNK for the Neo Geo MVS on September 24, 1996, and was then published for Neo Geo AES on December 13 of the same year. The game was later ported by Saurus to the PlayStation and Sega Saturn, both of which were released in May 1997. It was released on the Wii Virtual Console. Hamster Corporation re-released the game as part of their ACA Neo Geo series for the PlayStation 4, Xbox One, Nintendo Switch, Windows, Android and iOS.

== Reception ==
Reception

Review scores
Publication	Score
AllGame	(Neo Geo) 1.5/5
Famitsu	(Saturn) 58/100
Dengeki PlayStation	(PS) 70/100, 60/100
Neo Geo Freak	(Arcade) 13/20
Sega Saturn Magazine (JP)	(Saturn) 6.33/10

Stakes Winner 2 was met with mixed reception from critics and reviewers since its release. In Japan, Game Machine listed it on their November 1, 1996 issue as being the fourth most-successful arcade game of the month, outperforming titles such as Dancing Eyes, Street Fighter Alpha 2 and The King of Fighters '96.
