= Baseball Stars 2 =

1992 video game

- Developers: SNK; Pixel (NES)
- Publishers: SNK; Romstar (NES)
- Producer: Eikichi Kawasaki
- Designer: Masami Tokusue
- Composers: Kazuhiro Nishida; Masahiko Hataya
- Series: Baseball Stars
- Platform: Arcade: Neo Geo AES, Neo Geo CD, Nintendo Entertainment System
- Release: April 15, 1992: Arcade; WW: April 15, 1992 Neo Geo AES; WW: April 28, 1992 NES; NA: July 1992 Neo Geo CD; JP: September 9, 1994; NA: October 1996
- Genre: Sports
- Modes: Single-player, multiplayer
- Arcade system: Neo Geo MVS

Baseball Stars 2 (Note: Japanese: ベースボール・スターズ 2, Hepburn: Bēsubōru Sutāzu 2) is a 1992 baseball video game developed and published by SNK for the Neo Geo arcade and home platforms. A console version was released for the NES by Romstar the same year.

== Gameplay ==
Gameplay screenshot from the original Neo Geo version.

The player can select from one of 18 teams across two leagues: Exciting League (beginner) & Fighting League (expert).

It featured 18 teams across 2 leagues (Exciting League and Fighting League) and put more emphasis on the graphics and the gameplay; for example, being able to change pitchers or batters and powering up batters which increased the size of the bat.

=== NES version ===
Baseball Stars 2 for the Nintendo Entertainment System was distributed by Romstar in 1992.

Changes made from the original Baseball Stars, released by SNK in 1989:

- Female players are no longer included in any form.
- Two additional batting stances. These additional stances are never used for players on custom teams. They will only appear on the pre-made teams' players
- Enhanced pitch control.
- Ability to shift field formations when playing defense.
- Ability to view player's team roster and ratings while in-game.
- Sidearm-style pitchers are never generated on custom teams. They can only be hired.
- Easier bunting controls; bunts are now retractable.
- Ability to see lead-offs while pitching/batting.
- Six pitchers and four bench players instead of five each.
- New music and home run animations. These include the "Power connect" graphic for a two-run home run, an animated graphic of the batter rounding the bases and pumping his fist for a 3-run home run or grand slam, and a similar (yet very rare) graphic including a West Highland White Terrier following the batter for a come-from-behind (usually game-ending) home run in a dramatic situation.
- Can no longer name custom teams or rename players on custom teams.
- The players can still upgrade the baseball player using the same 15-point system introduced in the original Baseball Stars. However, the random points the players gets to disperse to various skills each time they purchase a player upgrade changed from between 1 and 6 to between 1 and 5.
- Player upgrades overall are much more expensive while the money received during play has remained about the same. This makes it much more time-consuming to upgrade players to maximum.
- Users can still fire and hire players, although due to the fact that they cannot change the names of hired players the player's hired player will always be named generic names given by the game (examples 'STAR 5', 'ROOK 2', etc.). This can also lead to multiple players sharing the same name throughout the custom teams, even conceivably multiple players on the same team with the same name.

Players can still create leagues of up to 125 games (6 teams playing each other 25 times) and view statistics such as League Standings and Top 10 in Average, Home Runs, Runs Batted In, Earned Run Average, Wins and Saves (a peculiar glitch occurs when viewing league leaders; the last pitcher listed on any user-created team in "View Team" does not appear in any of the Top 10 leaderboards).

== Reception ==
Reception (Neo Geo)

Review scores
Publication	Score
GameFan	196 / 200
Player One	92%

RePlay reported Baseball Stars 2 to be the sixteenth most-popular arcade game at the time. In Japan, Game Machine listed Baseball Stars 2 on their June 1, 1992 issue as being the eighth most-successful table arcade unit of the month.

The Neo Geo version was critically acclaimed. The first issue of GameFan reviewed the Neo Geo version, with its two reviewers scoring it 99% and 97%; the former said it "is far and away the best sports game I have ever played" and the latter said the "graphics are incredibly well detailed" and "the gameplay is unparalleled". They concluded that it "has the best graphics, sound, and game play this side of ESPN".

The NES version was less popular than the original Baseball Stars was on the NES. Reasons for this included the inability to change the name of a gamer-created team or names of the players on a gamer-created team, and unimproved graphics over the original. A Nintendo Power review wrote that "Baseball Stars 2 is such a complete rehash that if you already own the original, it is not worth your money to get this game".

== Re-releases ==
The game was included in the SNK Arcade Classics Vol. 1 compilation by SNK Playmore for PlayStation 2, PlayStation Portable and Wii, released on 2008.

The Neo Geo version was re-released for Wii by D4 Enterprise via the Virtual Console in Japan on October 30, 2007, in PAL regions on November 30, and in North America on December 10.

SNK Playmore released ports for PlayStation 3 and PlayStation Portable developed by M2 on August 25, 2011, on PlayStation Network via NEOGEO Station in Japan and North America on July 19, and in PAL regions on August 24.

A port for Linux, OS X, and Windows developed by DotEmu was released by SNK Playmore as part of the Humble NEOGEO 25th Anniversary Bundle on December 8, 2015. It was released on Steam on April 27, 2016, and on GOG.com on May 30, 2017.

Hamster Corporation re-released the game as part of their ACA Neo Geo series for the PlayStation 4, Xbox One, Nintendo Switch, Windows, Android and iOS.
