= Neo Drift Out: New Technology =

1996 video game

- Developer: Visco Corporation
- Publishers: Arcade: JP: Visco Corporation; NA/EU: SNK; Neo Geo CD: JP: Visco Corporation
- Producer: Tetsuo Akiyama
- Programmers: C. Ohmori; Hagi Saito; Masahiro Honma
- Artists: M. Hasegawa; M. Shimura; T. Nakahata
- Series: Drift Out
- Platforms: Arcade, Neo Geo CD
- Release: Arcade: JP: 28 March 1996; Neo Geo CD: JP: 26 July 1996
- Genre: Racing
- Modes: Single-player, multiplayer
- Arcade system: Neo Geo MVS

Neo Drift Out: New Technology (Note: Also known as Neo Drift Out (Japanese: NEO ドリフト アウト, Hepburn: Neo Dorifuto Auto) in Japan.) is a 1996 rallying video game developed by Visco Corporation for the Neo Geo and Neo Geo CD. It is the fourth title in the Drift Out series. Though it follows Super Drift Out: World Rally Championships, it is closer to the earlier Drift Out '94: The Hard Order.

In Neo Drift Out: New Technology, players race through various tracks in high-speed rally racing machines, competing against other drivers. The game features a variety of modes, including a single-player campaign and a multiplayer mode in which up to two players can race against each other.

Neo Drift Out: New Technology received positive reviews upon release, with many praising its smooth gameplay and challenging course design with alternate paths.

== Gameplay ==
Gameplay screenshot

Neo Drift Out is an arcade-style rallying game with an isometric view. To start things off, the player chooses between three Japanese rally-spec vehicles—the Mitsubishi Lancer, the Subaru Impreza, and the Toyota Celica—which vary with their Speed, Control, and Body stats.

In each stage, the player needs to get to the finish line in the shortest time possible. If the clock hits zero, the player loses and the game is over unless they can continue. While driving, the player's time is hindered by barrels, puddles, slippery ice, cones and other obstacles that are in the player's path. Even other cars driving can be an obstacle. Also the player has to keep their rally car straight when driving up slopes, or the car will swerve and crash. The player can gain more time if they make it through checkpoints in between the starting and finishing points. The player can also take shortcuts. Before making a turn, the player will always get an immediate warning on the screen with a voice saying which direction the player ought to turn along with certain other warnings.

Aside from the starting Practice stage, there are six other stages to be conquered: European, African, Snow Land, Southern Hemisphere, Scandinavian, and Great Britain.

== Reception ==
Reception

Review scores
Publication	Score
AllGame	(AC) 3/5
M! Games	(NGCD) 59%
Super Game Power	(NG) 4.5/5.0
Neo Geo Freak	(AC) 12/20

Neo Drift Out: New Technology was met with generally positive reception from critics. AllGame's Paul Biondich praised its intuitive but difficult-to-master gameplay and speed but criticized the audiovisual presentation for being standard and uninspired. MAN!AC's Andreas Knauf reviewed the Neo Geo CD version and commended its fast gameplay but regarded the sound design as "unimportant" and the graphics to be better than the original Drift Out. Brazilian magazine Super Game Power compared the game with Power Drive Rally, giving high remarks to the graphics, sound, controls and fun factor.

In 2014, HobbyConsolas identified Neo Drift Out as one of the twenty best games for the Neo Geo CD. Likewise Time Extension also listed it as one of the best games for the Neo Geo.
