= Burning Fight =

1991 video game

- Arcade flyer
- Developer: SNK
- Publisher: SNK
- Producer: Eikichi Kawasaki
- Designer: Naoto Abe
- Composer: Yasumasa Yamada
- Platforms: Arcade, Neo Geo AES, Neo Geo CD
- Release: Arcade: WW: May 20, 1991; Neo Geo AES: WW: August 9, 1991; Neo Geo CD: JP: September 9, 1994; NA: October 1996
- Genre: Beat 'em up
- Modes: Single-player, multiplayer
- Arcade system: Neo Geo MVS

Burning Fight (Note: Japanese: バーニング・ファイト, Hepburn: Bāningu Faito) is a 1991 beat 'em up video game developed and published by SNK for the Neo Geo arcade and home platforms. Introduced to capture a share in the then-popular beat 'em ups market, it was meant to compete with Technōs Japan's Double Dragon, the leader of the genre at the time. Three years after its release in the arcades and on the Neo Geo AES, it was released on Neo Geo CD as the only other home version.

A re-release version of Burning Fight is included in SNK Arcade Classics Vol. 1, which was released for the PlayStation 2, PlayStation Portable and Wii in 2008. Hamster Corporation re-released the game as part of their ACA Neo Geo series for the PlayStation 4, Xbox One, Nintendo Switch, Windows, Android and iOS.

== Plot ==
Duke Edwards and Billy King, two renowned New York City Police detectives, are hot on the trail of a dangerous Japanese crime syndicate. Their investigation has led them to the mean streets of Japan where they meet a police officer and martial arts expert named Ryu Saeba. Ryu agrees to join the NYPD detectives as they track down the crime syndicate bosses and end their reign of terror once and for all.

== Gameplay ==
Gameplay screenshot showcasing the first boss.

Burning Fight follows a formula and concepts commonly seen in titles of this genre, such as Streets of Rage, Double Dragon and Final Fight: balanced character selection, objects and weapons found on the ground cause greater damage to opponents, and semi-interactive environments (players can damage objects like phone booths and street signs along the way). The game is set in a fictional version of Osaka city (during a train station scene the platform even shows an "Umida" station sign). The five levels must be completed (Casterora is the last enemy) to win the game.

== Reception ==
Reception

Aggregate score
Aggregator	Score
GameRankings	(NG) 55% (NS) 30%

Review scores
Publication	Score
AllGame	(NG) 2/5
Consoles +	(NG) 92%
Computer and Video Games	(NG) 92/100
Eurogamer	(Wii) 7/10
GamePro	(NG) 24/25
IGN	(Wii) 4.5/10
Joypad	(NG) 92%
Joystick	(NG) 92%
Nintendo Life	(Wii) 5/10 (NS) 3/10
Player One	(NG) 85%
Sinclair User	(AC) 74%

In Japan, Game Machine listed Burning Fight as the eighth most popular arcade game of June 1991. Likewise, RePlay reported the game to be the second most popular arcade game of that month. Since its release, the game has received generally mixed reception from critics, with most comparing it with better known competitors in the beat 'em up genre. Both the Neo Geo and Nintendo Switch versions hold a 55% and 30% respectively on the review aggregator GameRankings.

AllGame's Kyle Knight regarded Burning Fight as a Final Fight rip-off of inferior quality, criticizing the "jerky and stiff" character animations, lack of enemy variety, as well as the repetitive fighting system and gameplay; however, he commended the controls and audio. In contrast, Consoles Plus' Loulou and El Nio Nio compared the game with both Final Fight and Streets of Rage, but praised the presentation, graphics, animations, hard rock-style soundtrack, gameplay and longevity. Computer and Video Games' Paul Rand and Tim Boone also regarded Burning Fight as a Final Fight rip-off, while Rand in particular drew comparison between Cody and Guy with two of the playable characters. Unlike Knight, both Rand and Boone praised the visuals, sound, gameplay and longevity, but criticized the absence of unlimited continues in the AES version.

GamePro's Slasher Quan wrote that Burning Fight was similar to Final Fight in terms of visuals and gameplay, but also praised the presentation and music. Both Joypad's Steph and Joystick's Jean-Marc Demoly compared Burning Fight to Final Fight, Ninja Gaiden, and Streets of Rage, but praised the audiovisual presentation and controls. Player One's Cyril Drevet compared its two-player mode with Double Dragon but commended the visuals, animations, audio, difficulty and longevity. However, Sinclair User highlighted a sense of dullness in the game, stating that "Burning Fight is a competent journey along the usual beat-'em-up road..."

Burning Fight has been met with a more mixed reception from critics in recent years, with Eurogamer's Dan Whitehead in particular regarding the game as a blatant copy of both Final Fight and Streets of Rage. IGN's Lucas M. Thomas also compared its gameplay to Double Dragon, but regarded it as more playable than Ninja Combat. Nintendo Life's Damien McFerran and Dave Frear were critical of the game when reviewing the Virtual Console and Nintendo Switch releases respectively, comparing the playable cast of characters with those of Final Fight, while McFerran criticized the poor character animations.
