= ZuPaPa! =

2001 video game

- Developer: SNK (Note: Originally developed by Face.)
- Publisher: SNK
- Platform: Arcade
- Release: NA/JP: September 1, 2001
- Genre: Platform
- Modes: Single-player, multiplayer
- Arcade system: Neo Geo MVS

ZuPaPa! (Note: Japanese: ズパパ！) is a 2001 platform video game developed and published by SNK for the Neo Geo arcade platform. It stars the eponymous anthropomorphic creature. Players are tasked with travelling through nine stages, throwing small creatures called Zooks, jumping on and off platforms to navigate level obstacles while dodging and defeating minions. The game has been re-released through download services for various consoles.

== Gameplay ==
Gameplay screenshot

ZuPaPa! is a platform game reminiscent of Bubble Bobble and Snow Bros., where players assume the role of anthropomorphic star-like creatures ZuPaPa (P1) and ZuPiPi (P2) through various stages, each with a boss at the end that must be fought before progressing any further.

Each player can throw small creatures called Zooks at enemies until each one is completely covered and turns into a star bomb, which defeats any enemy that comes into contact with it. The more Zooks are thrown against an enemy, the larger the attack range becomes. Defeated enemies may drop items or power-ups such as speed increasers and bonus points. Players have to complete every level within a specific period of time before exceeding an invisible timer. If the players do not manage to eliminate all the enemies in time, an angry alarm clock will ring loudly and a devil creature will appear.

Getting hit by enemy fire or if the devil manages to touch ZuPaPa or ZuPiPi before all enemies are eliminated will result in losing a life, as well as a penalty of decreasing the characters' firepower and speed to their original state. Once all lives are lost, the game is over unless the players insert more credits into the arcade machine to continue playing.

== Release ==
ZuPaPa! was originally developed by Face and was first showcased to the public at the 1994 AOU Show in addition to being previewed through various publications. It languished in development hell, remaining vaporware until SNK acquired the prototype from Face after its bankruptcy. SNK redeveloped the game and published it in September 2001, ironically also going bankrupt a month later. Hamster Corporation re-released the game as part of their ACA Neo Geo series for the PlayStation 4, Xbox One, Nintendo Switch, Windows, Android and iOS.

== Reception ==
IGN Italia's Andrea Corritore regarded ZuPaPa! to be a "cult title". Chris Moyse of Destructoid praised the sprite work but noted the gameplay to be "anachronistic". Both Hobby Consolas and Meristation noted its similarity with Snow Bros.
