= Baseball Stars Professional =

1991 video game

- North American arcade flyer
- Developer: SNK
- Publisher: SNK
- Designers: Miki T. Toyohisa Tanabe
- Composer: Toshikazu Tanaka
- Series: Baseball Stars
- Platforms: Arcade, Neo Geo AES, Neo Geo CD
- Release: Arcade: WW: April 26, 1990; Neo Geo AES: WW: July 1. 1991; Neo Geo CD: JP: April 21, 1995; NA: October 1996
- Genre: Sports
- Modes: Single-player, multiplayer
- Arcade system: Neo Geo MVS

Baseball Stars Professional (Note: Japanese: ベースボール・スターズ・プロフェッショナル, Hepburn: Bēsubōru Sutāzu Purofesshonaru) is a 1990 baseball video game developed and published by SNK for the Neo Geo arcade and home platforms. A follow-up to the original Baseball Stars for the NES, it was one of the launch titles for both the MVS (on which it was a pack-in title) and Neo Geo AES home console, as well as the first baseball-themed game for the Neo Geo platform. Players compete with either computer-controlled opponents or against other players in matches across various ballparks.

Baseball Stars Professional garnered mixed reception from critics upon its original release; many praised various aspects of the game, such as the presentation, visuals and quality of the digitized voice samples, but some were divided in regards to the gameplay. The game would later be re-released for the Neo Geo CD in 1995, as well as through download services for various consoles.

== Gameplay ==
Gameplay screenshot showcasing the player's batter about to hit the ball.

Baseball Stars Professional is a baseball game similar to the original Baseball Stars and other baseball titles from the era, where players compete in matches against computer-controlled opponents or other players across two ballparks. There are only two modes featured in the game: Tournament is the main single-player mode where one player compete against CPU-controlled opponents in a season. Versus, as the name implies, is a two-player mode where two people compete against each other. Most of the original teams featured in the first Baseball Stars return in this game, although some of the features within the first game were removed for a more arcade-style approach of the sport, such as team management and the ability to create a new team from the ground up, among others. If a memory card is present, the players are allowed to save their progress and resume into the last match the game saved at through a password system.

== Development and release ==
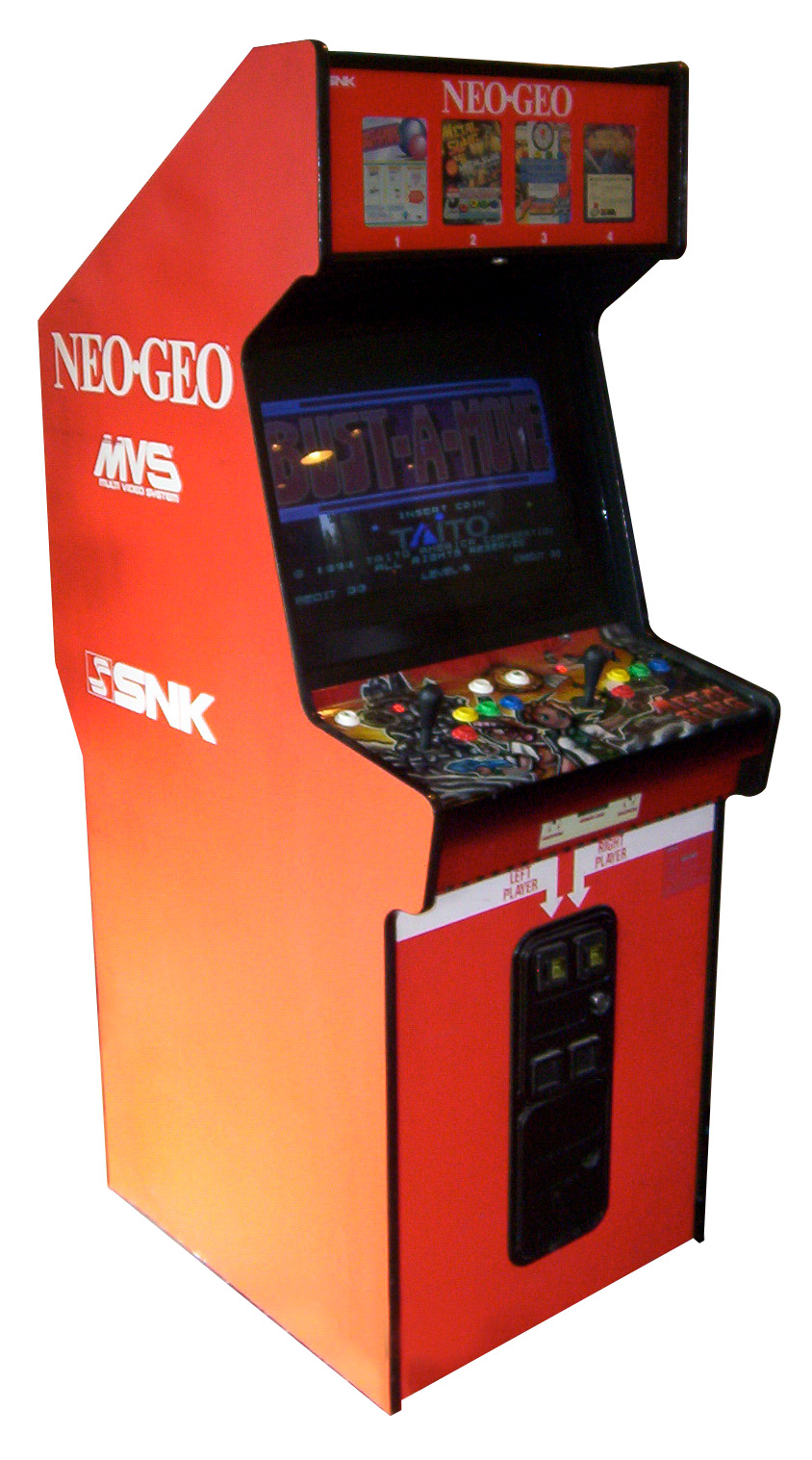
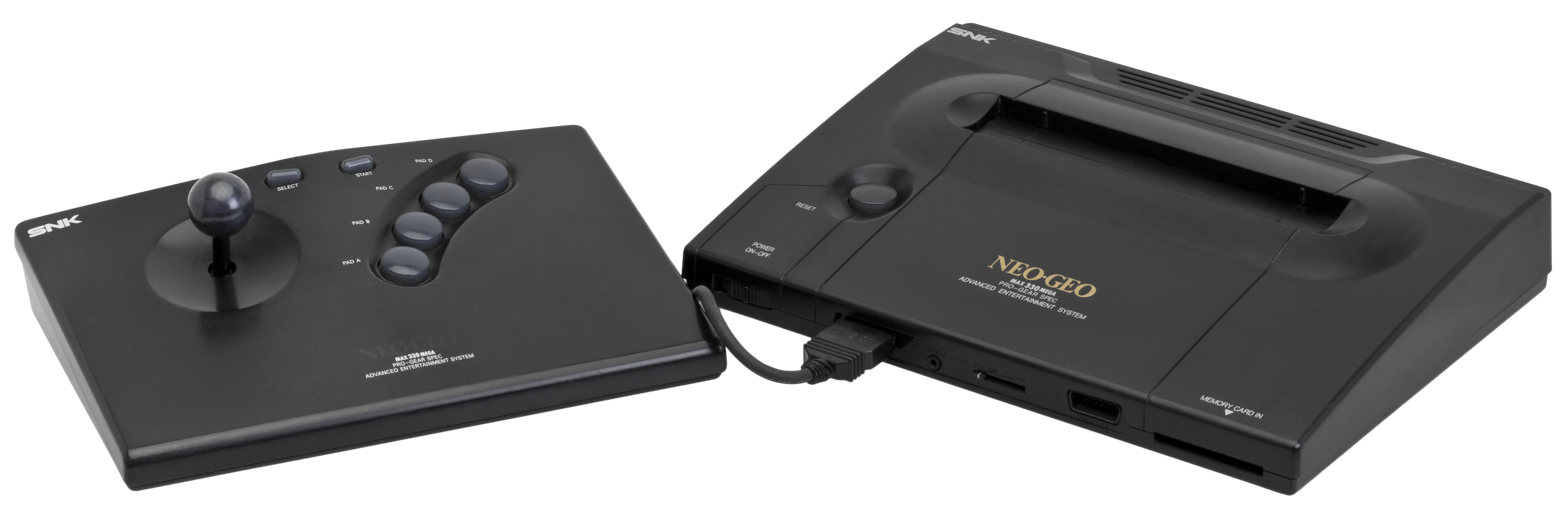
Baseball Stars Professional was one of the first games released for the Neo Geo MVS (left) and Neo Geo AES (right).

Baseball Stars Professional was initially launched for arcades on 26 April 1990, and was the first baseball game developed for the Neo Geo MVS platform. The game was also released during the same period for the Neo Geo AES, which was originally a rental-only system for Japanese game stores and hotels until being released as a home console due to high demand on July 1, 1991. The game was also re-released for the Neo Geo CD on April 21, 1995, with minimal changes compared to the original MVS and AES versions. The game was re-released for the Wii Virtual Console. Hamster Corporation re-released the game as part of their ACA Neo Geo series for the PlayStation 4, Xbox One, Nintendo Switch, Windows, Android and iOS.

== Reception ==
Reception

Review scores
Publication	Score
AllGame	(Arcade) (Neo Geo)
CVG Mean Machines	(Neo Geo) 61%
Famitsu	(Neo Geo CD) 21 / 40
The Games Machine	(Neo Geo) 75%
GamePro	(Neo Geo) 19 / 25
Hobby Consolas	(Neo Geo) 84 / 100
Joystick	(Neo Geo) 92%
Mega Fun	(Neo Geo) 80%
Micom BASIC Magazine	(Neo Geo)
Neo Geo Freak	(Arcade) 5 / 20

RePlay reported Baseball Stars Professional to be the eighth most popular arcade game at the time. In Japan, Game Machine listed Baseball Stars Professional as the fourteenth most popular arcade game of December 1990.

Baseball Stars Professional received mixed reception from critics after its initial launch. Famicom Tsūshin scored the Neo Geo CD version of the game a 21 out of 40.
