= Breakers (1996 video game) =

- Developers: Visco Corporation exA-Arcadia (Chicago)
- Publishers: SNK: Visco Corporation (PSX); JoshProd/RushOnGame (DC); exA-Arcadia (Chicago)
- Producer: Tetsuo Akiyama
- Designer: Don Gabacho
- Programmers: Hagi Saito; Sin Suzuki; T. Miyazawa
- Artists: A. Shibata; Atsushi Miyazaki; E. Tamura
- Composer: Kenichi Kamio
- Series: Breakers
- Platforms: Arcade, Neo Geo AES, Neo Geo CD
- Release: Arcade: JP: December 17, 1996; NA: 1996; Neo Geo AES: JP: March 21, 1997; Neo Geo CD: JP: April 25, 1997
- Genre: Fighting
- Modes: Single-player, multiplayer
- Arcade system: Neo Geo MVS, exA-Arcadia

Breakers (ブレイカーズ, Bureikāzu) is a 1996 fighting game developed by Visco Corporation, which was released for the Neo Geo. It was followed up by Breakers Revenge (ブレイカーズリベンジ, Bureikāzu Ribenji) in 1998 and Breakers Revenge Chicago (Japanese: ブレイカーズリベンジ死嘩護), developed by exA-Arcadia and released in July 2024.

== Gameplay ==
Gameplay screenshot of the original Breakers showcasing a match between Sho Kamui and Rila Estansia.

The controls of the game is similar to that of SNK's earlier installments in their Fatal Fury series (particularly Fatal Fury 2, Special and 3). The special actions are also similar to other fighting games from the same era, although the dashing and back-stepping techniques tend to differ between characters (some of them will roll on the floor for example). Additionally, the player can move while standing up after a fall. The game system emphasizes balance between characters by featuring an elaborate damage adjustment feature.

The player also can perform super moves by accumulating enough energy in their power gauge and performing the command (the power gauge can be filled up to three levels). To accumulate energy for the Power Gauge, the player must perform special actions such as taunting, dashing, back-stepping, rolling, etc. Like most fighting games, the player can cancel a regular move into a special move or special move into a super move, but the player can also connect one super move to another until their Power Gauge runs out, allowing the player to perform acrobatic combos. Because of its emphasis on damage adjustment, it is hard to spam the same attacks for great damage.

The matches follows the standard one-on-one best two-of-three format like most fighting games, but a match can last up to five rounds if there is no clear-cut winner in previous rounds (the game will end if both fighters lose the fifth round and no bonus points will be awarded if one wins the fifth round). In the single player mode, if the CPU uses the same character as the player, then the CPU-controlled character's name display will have a different name.

The home versions of the game were released for the Neo-Geo AES and the Neo-Geo CD. Both versions feature an option menu with a sound test allowing the player to play the game's music, sound effects and voices. The CD version adds a 2-player Versus Mode and a Survival Mode. The music is also slightly-arranged. The final boss Bai-Hu is also a playable character in the CD version.

An updated version of the game titled Breakers Revenge (ブレイカーズリベンジ, Bureikāzu Ribenji) introduces one new character named Saizo and makes the final boss Bai-Hu into a playable character. Revenge makes adjustments to the existing cast of characters, rebalancing the game, the lifebars in this game were modified to look different compared to the first game's lifebars, and some stages' graphics were removed (e.g. flags in Sho Kamui's stage). However, the opening intro is almost identical to that of the first game and game's graphics are not that different.

Breakers Revenge Chicago (Japanese: ブレイカーズリベンジ死嘩護) combines the gameplay of Breakers Revenge (Japanese: ブレイカーズリベンジ), the hidden Extra mode from the Neo-Geo CD version and a new style called Chicago into 3 selectable play styles. While Revenge is the same as the last installment, Extra! and Chicago are rebalanced. A rebalanced Bai-Hu is now playable without a code. New graphics and HUD have been added to the game. A new arranged soundtrack by Kenichi Kamio along with the Neo-Geo CD soundtrack are also included in the game. Artwork by manga artist Motoki Yoshihara have been added in the game as wallpaper.

== Plot ==
The following plot summary is translated from the home versions' manual:

Somewhere in Hong Kong, two martial artists face each other in a vast courtyard. The challenger is a stout man in brown skin. The ground has been tainted with blood. However, his crescent blade has not touched his opponent yet. It was a one-sided battle. He was already exhausted and it will not be long before he would fall. "Fool, you will become one of my family" resounded the opponent's voice, as the challenger crumbled to the floor and was turned into sand.'

The Fighting Instinct Tournament, or FIST, is a tournament as fierce as its name suggests. There was no shortage of martial artists who entered the tournament seeking fame, and yet there were many who left the tournament as corpses. The last challenger who remains in this lawless tournament gets to challenge the organizer of the tournament, the Head of the Huang Financial Clique, for the chance to win the massive prize money. The martial artist who can manage to defeat him will obtain the honor of truly calling him or herself the strongest. However, none of the martial artists who were chosen to challenge the champion in a private final match have ever come back alive. Nobody knows when exactly the tournament is held, since only an avaricious will was spiraling over there. The sponsor is actually an evil spirit who possessed the body of a modern man from Hong Kong who has established a selection system to amplify his dark powers. The FIST tournament has gathered numerous participants from around the globe and another sacrifice will be chosen this year.

=== Main characters ===
Most characters in the game take inspiration from Street Fighter II. The original Breakers features a roster of eight playable characters and a single boss character who is playable only in the home versions. Additionally, each of the playable characters has a differently named palette-swapped alter-ego that each character face during the single-player mode instead of the usual clone. Breakers Revenge introduces one new character and turns the boss into a playable character as well.

- Sho Kamui (神威 翔, Kamui Shō) - The lead character. A young karate expert from Japan who is pursuing strength. In the 1994 prototype Crystal Legacy, he was known as Takeshi Kamui (神威 武, Kamui Takeshi). He is a playable guest character in 2023 video game, Pocket Bravery, featuring all of Breakers characters in his background stage.
- (South Korea) Lee Dao-Long (李 刀龍; Romaji: Rī Taoron, Pinyin: Lǐ Dāolóng) - Sho's rival and senior. A young Korean who practices a Chinese martial art called the "Empty Fist." In the 1994 prototype Crystal Legacy, he was known as Park Tong Shin (朴 東勝; Pinyin: Piáo Dōngshèng), and wears a slightly different outfit.
- (Thailand) Tia Langray (ティア・ラングレー, Tia Rangurē) - A female fighter in a red leotard and headband famous for her kicks. Her name in the 1994 prototype Crystal Legacy was Shelly Tarlar, which was given to her clone counterpart in Breakers. Her prototype version wears a slightly different outfit. Tia joins the tournament to find her older brother, a talented fighter who disappeared in strange circumstances. If she wins, she finds him alive.
- (Italy) Pielle Montario (ピエール・モンタリオ, Piēru Montario) - An Italian nobleman who fights with a fencer's weapon (most likely an épée or rapier) and the power of lightning. In the 1994 prototype Crystal Legacy, his name was spelled as Pierre Montalio, with the "l"'s and "r" switched.
- (United States) Condor Heads (コンドル・ヘッズ, Kondoru Hezzu) - A Native American fighter who uses a powerful grappling style. In the 1994 prototype Crystal Legacy, he was known as Red Gigars, a name given to his clone counterpart.
- (Saudi Arabia) Sheik Maherl (シーク・マハール, Shīku Mahāru) - A stocky Arabian man who fights with a scimitar and uses fire projectiles, but can also inflate himself like a balloon. In the 1994 prototype Crystal Legacy, he was known as Sahl Mahal (サージ・マハール, Sāji Mahāru).
- (Brazil) Rila Estansia (ライラ・エスタンシア, Raira Esutanshia) - A wild-hearted protector of the wilderness and forests of the Amazon who attacks with her claws and speed. In the 1994 prototype Crystal Legacy, she was known as Virgo Sandra, which was given to her clone counterpart in Breakers.
- (Egypt) Alsion III (アルシオンIII世, Arushion Sansei) - An undead ancient Egyptian with rubber-like limbs who uses electric and poison attacks. Unlike other characters, in the 1994 prototype Crystal Legacy, his main name is the same name in Breakers, and was neither changed to a different name, nor given to his clone counterpart.
- (China) Huang Bai-Hu (黄 白虎; Romaji: Hoan Paifū, Pinyin: Huáng Báihǔ) - The game's final boss. Supposedly the world's strongest martial artist, he is an evil spirit who killed Dao-Long's father and possessed his body. In the 1994 prototype Crystal Legacy, he was known as Wong Shiu-Hwu.
- (Japan) Saizo Tobikageno (飛影 才蔵, Tobikageno Saizō) - A ninja who seeks revenge on Bai-Hu for the slaughter of his clan. His attacks use fire and various animals. He is the only new character in Breakers Revenge.

=== Clone characters ===
During the single-player mode, instead of fighting a clone of their character, the player will face a differently named, differently colored alter-ego. Even though these alter-egos have different names and back-stories, they are otherwise palette-swaps of the regular characters.

- Jin Sawamura (沢村 陣, Sawamura Jin) - Sho's alter-ego, named after a certain game company employee. A karate master who is Sho and Dao-Long's senior. A big fan of the band group TUBE. Like Sho, he also guest appears in Pocket Bravery, serving as his counterpart's alternate color palette, where Sho's name will change into Jin's upon selecting the said color palette.
- Wáng Liu-Khai (王 劉凱) - Dao-Long's alter-ego, although he has no connection with him. A young Chinese who aspires to become a voice actor. He resents his girlfriend for leaving him.
- Shelly Tarlar (シェリー・ターラー, Sherī Tārā) - Tia's alter-ego. A female kickboxer who fought Tia's brother in the past and is a local celebrity in her hometown. She possesses the so-called "Gem of Water".
- George (ジョルジュ, Joruju) - Pielle's alter-ego. A Frenchman who was once robbed during a trip to Italy and has harbored a hatred for Italians ever since.
- Red Gigars (レッドギガース, Reddo Gigāsu) - Condor's alter-ego. He is a distant relative of Condor whose clan shares a common ancestry with Condor's. He possesses the so-called "Gem of Earth".
- Javar (ジャバァ, Jaba) - Maherl's alter-ego. A cheerful butcher who uses his butchering blade as a combat weapon.
- Virgo Sandra (ヴァーゴ・サンドラ, Vāgo Sandora) - Rila's alter-ego. A woman who was entrusted to the "forest tribe" as an orphan and was raised by a giant snake. She possesses the so-called "Green Gem". Her surname, "Sandra", comes from the village where she lives.
- Atoum (アトゥーム, Atūmu) - Alsion III's alter-ego. A fan of ancient civilization who dresses up like a mummy. When he is in this form, he can use the techniques of the "Pharaoh Taijutsu" style. In reality, he is a descendant of Alsion III.
- Yukikage (雪影) - Saizo's alter-ego. Like his counterpart, he appears only in Breakers Revenge. It is uncertain whether he is a real ninja or just a fanatic dressing like one.

== Development ==
Gameplay screenshot of Breakers Revenge showcasing a match between Saizo Tobikageno and Tia Langray.

Breakers was one of many video games that tried to copy the formula of Street Fighter II and achieve similar success. Breakers was originally announced in 1993 under the title of Crystal Legacy in English, or Tenrin no Syo Chicago (天麟の書 死嘩護) in Japanese. The game was first announced in the premiere issue of Game Hisshō Guide (ゲーム必勝ガイド) published by Byakuya Shobo in 1993, while the first issue of Game Center Tenkoku (ゲーセン天国) published by Tokuma Shoten during the same year revealed the first screenshot of the game. An issue of Geibunsha's Super Gamers magazine published a strategy guide for this prototype, which differs from the released version by having only a single-level special move gauge, different commands and move names for some of the characters, and having the same Super Move command (ABCD simultaneously) for all the characters.

Tenrin no Syo underwent location testing in June 1994 at the Famil game center near Shiinamachi Station and was later shown at the AM Show during the same year, before the game was revamped and retitled Breakers.

== Release ==
Breakers was released for the Neo-Geo arcade platform on December 17, 1996. Home versions were released for the Neo Geo cartridge console on March 21, 1997, and for the Neo Geo CD on April 25, 1997. An updated version of the game titled Breakers Revenge was released exclusively for the arcades on July 3, 1998.

A collection including the two games, titled Breakers Collection, was announced for consoles and PC in 2019 but was postponed to 2022 and again to 2023. The collection was released for PlayStation 5, PlayStation 4, Xbox Series X/S, Xbox One, Nintendo Switch and Microsoft Windows on January 12, 2023. Breakers Revenge was given a limited cartridge release for the Neo Geo home console by Columbus Circle in 2020.

In April 2024, during EVO Japan it was announced that a new Breakers game called Breakers Revenge Chicago will be released in Arcades.

== Reception ==
Reception

Review score
| Publication | Score |
|---|---|
| Neo Geo Freak | (Arcade) 10/20 |

In Japan, Game Machine listed Breakers as the thirteenth most successful arcade game of January 1997.

The game is rather obscure in the arcade and Neo Geo scene, but it has gained something of a cult following. Along with no home ports of Breakers Revenge being released, the home ports of the original Breakers was never released outside Japan, pushing it deeper into obscurity. Due to its status and notoriety as a cult classic, it can still be seen being played in some modern Japanese fighting game tournaments. Even more so, the game is now more accessible due to the existence of emulators.
