= SNK Arcade Classics Vol. 1 =

2008 video game

- Developers: Terminal Reality, Alpha Denshi, SNK
- Publisher: SNK Playmore
- Platforms: PlayStation 2, PlayStation Portable, Wii
- Release: PS2: NA: April 29, 2008; EU: September 20, 2008; PSP: NA: April 29, 2008; EU: September 20, 2008; JP: May 21, 2009; Wii: NA: July 28, 2008; EU: November 28, 2008
- Genre: Various
- Modes: Single-player, multiplayer

SNK Arcade Classics Vol. 1 is a video game compilation created and published by SNK which includes sixteen Neo Geo games. The compilation was released on the PlayStation 2, PlayStation Portable, and the Wii. In Australia, it was only released on the PlayStation 2.

A sequel was released in Japan titled SNK Arcade Classics 0. The reason for the title having a ‘0’ is because the games in this collection predate the Neo Geo AES console.

== Games included ==
Titles included in SNK Arcade Classics Vol. 1
Title	Release	Genre	Notes
Art of Fighting	1992	Fighting	
Baseball Stars 2	1992	Sports	
Burning Fight	1991	Beat 'em up	
Fatal Fury: King of Fighters	1991	Fighting	
King of the Monsters	1991	Fighting	
Last Resort	1992	Shoot 'em up	
Magician Lord	1990	Platform	
Metal Slug	1996	Shoot 'em up	
Neo Turf Masters	1996	Sports	
Samurai Shodown	1993	Fighting	
Sengoku	1991	Beat 'em up	
Shock Troopers	1997	Shoot 'em up	
Super Sidekicks 3: The Next Glory	1995	Sports	
The King of Fighters '94	1994	Fighting	
Top Hunter: Roddy & Cathy	1994	Platform	
World Heroes	1992	Fighting	Unlockable by obtaining 10 medals

All titles are modified to work with the in-game medal system as well as on-screen controls.

SNK Arcade Classics 0
- Developer: SNK Playmore
- Publisher: SNK Playmore
- Platform: PlayStation Portable
- Release: PSP: JP: April 21, 2011
- Genre: Various
- Mode: Single-player

== SNK Arcade Classics 0 ==
Titles included in SNK Arcade Classics 0
Title	Release	Genre	Notes
ASO (Alpha Mission)	1985	Shoot 'em up	
Athena	1986	Platform	
Bermuda Triangle	1987	Shoot 'em up	
Dogō Sōken (Ikari II)	1986	Shoot 'em up	
Gold Medalist	1988	Sports	
Guerrilla War	1987	Shoot 'em up	
HAL 21	1985	Shoot 'em up	
Ikari Warriors	1986	Shoot 'em up	
Ikari III: The Rescue	1989	Beat 'em up	Overseas version
Marvin's Maze	1983	Puzzle	
P.O.W.: Prisoners of War	1988	Beat 'em up	
Prehistoric Isle in 1930	1989	Shoot 'em up	
Psycho Soldier	1987	Shoot 'em up	
SAR: Search and Rescue	1989	Shoot 'em up	
Sasuke vs. Commander	1980	Shoot 'em up	
Street Smart	1989	Fighting	
Super Championship Baseball	1989	Sports	Overseas version
TANK	1985	Shoot 'em up	
Touchdown Fever	1987	Sports	
Vanguard II	1984	Shoot 'em up	

== Reception ==
Reception

Aggregate score
Aggregator	Score
Metacritic	(PS2) 69/100 (WII) 73/100

Review scores
Publication	Score
Destructoid	7.5/10
Eurogamer	7/10
GameSpot	6/10
GamesRadar+	3.5/5
GameZone	7.5/10
Giant Bomb	3/5
IGN	7.2/10
Nintendo Life	8/10

IGN gave the Wii version a 7.2 out of 10. They applauded the high value for money (roughly $2 per game), the inclusion of achievements, the short load times and limited slowdown compared to the PlayStation 2 and PSP versions, the selection of four control schemes which all work very well, the inclusion of multiplayer modes in most of the games, and the diversity of game genres offered. Their one criticism was the locking of move lists. GameSpot gave it a 6 out of 10. Like IGN, they criticized the locking of move lists; unlike them, they argued that of the four available control schemes, only the Classic Controller functions competently for all the games. However, their main complaint was that of the 16 games, only Last Resort and Metal Slug are worth getting, with the remaining 14 games being "middling to bad".
