= SNK 40th Anniversary Collection =

2018 video game

- Cover art for the Nintendo Switch version; the PS4 has an alternative cover art that depicts Princess Athena in armor.
- Developer: Digital Eclipse (Note: Original version developed by SNK)
- Publishers: SNK: NA/EU: NIS America (NS, PS4); WW: Other Ocean (Xbox One)
- Platforms: Nintendo Switch, PlayStation 4, Xbox One, Windows
- Release: Nintendo Switch: NA: November 13, 2018; EU: November 16, 2018; PlayStation 4: NA: March 19, 2019; EU: March 22, 2019; Xbox One: WW: May 3, 2019; Windows: WW: June 7, 2019
- Modes: Single-player, multiplayer

SNK 40th Anniversary Collection is a video game compilation developed by Digital Eclipse consisting of arcade and console games published by SNK between 1979 and 1990. The collection was released for the Nintendo Switch in 2018, and later in 2019 for PlayStation 4 on March 19, Xbox One on May 3, and Steam on July 7.

== Games included ==
The collection included 14 games for its original Nintendo Switch launch. 11 more games were added as free downloadable content on December 11, 2018 for a total of 25 games. All later ports of the collection launched with every game from the start, and the Xbox One version adds an exclusive game for a total of 26.

Original arcade versions are included for every game except for games never released in arcades (Baseball Stars, Crystalis, and Iron Tank), which run the Nintendo Entertainment System versions. The NES ports of some arcade games are also included.

Year	Game	Arcade ver.	Console ver.
1979	Ozma Wars ^{†}	Yes	No
1980	Sasuke vs. Commander ^{†}	Yes	No
1981	Vanguard	Yes	No
1981	Fantasy ^{†}	Yes	No
1983	Munch Mobile ^{†}	Yes	No
1985	Alpha Mission	Yes	Yes
1985	TNK III	Yes	No
1986	Athena	Yes	Yes
1986	Ikari Warriors	Yes	Yes
1986	Victory Road	Yes	Yes
1987	Bermuda Triangle ^{†}	Yes	No
1987	Guerrilla War	Yes	Yes
1987	Psycho Soldier	Yes	No
1987	Time Soldiers ^{†}	Yes	No
1987	World Wars ^{†}	Yes	No
1988	Chopper I ^{†}	Yes	No
1988	Iron Tank	No	Yes
1988	P.O.W.: Prisoners of War	Yes	Yes
1988	Paddle Mania ^{†}	Yes	No
1989	Baseball Stars ^{‡}	No	Yes
1989	Beast Busters ^{†}	Yes	No
1989	Ikari III: The Rescue	Yes	Yes
1989	Prehistoric Isle	Yes	No
1989	SAR: Search and Rescue ^{†}	Yes	No
1989	Street Smart	Yes	No
1990	Crystalis	No	Yes

^† Available as free DLC on Nintendo Switch.
^‡ Exclusive to the Xbox One version.

Any copyright information in the console games' title screens regarding Nintendo is still present on all platforms.

== Reception ==
Reception

Review scores
Publication	Score
Electronic Gaming Monthly	90%
GameRevolution	4/5
GameSpot	8/10
IGN	7.0/10
Jeuxvideo.com	60%
Nintendo Life	8/10
Nintendo World Report	9/10
Push Square	7/10
Hardcore Gamer	4/5

Electronic Gaming Monthly reviewer said that it was "one of the most impressive retro compilations I’ve encountered in recent memory". GameRevolution were impressed with "how much care and thought went into every corner of it".

Jeuxvideo.com were not as impressed, saying "the good emulation, interface and functionalities don't balance the cruel absence of many great SNK games".
