= Alpha Mission II =

1991 video game

- Arcade flyer
- Developer: SNK
- Publisher: SNK
- Producer: Eikichi Kawasaki
- Designers: Kazuto Kouno; Kazuhiro Shibata; Keisen Yamaguchi
- Programmer: Sho Chan
- Composers: Kazuhiro Nishida; Toshikazu Tanaka; Yoko Osaka
- Series: Alpha Mission
- Platforms: Arcade, Neo Geo AES, Neo Geo CD
- Release: Arcade: WW: March 25, 1991; Neo Geo AES: WW: July 1, 1991; Neo Geo CD: JP: September 9, 1994; NA: October 1996
- Genre: Scrolling shooter
- Modes: Single-player, multiplayer
- Arcade system: Neo Geo MVS

Alpha Mission II, released in Japan as ASO II: Last Guardian (Note: Japanese: ASO II：ラスト ガーディアン, Hepburn: ASO II: Rasuto Gādian), is a 1991 vertically scrolling shooter video game developed and published by SNK for the Neo Geo arcade and home systems. It is the sequel to the 1985 arcade game Alpha Mission. It was later released for the Neo Geo CD in 1994. Hamster Corporation re-released the game as part of their ACA Neo Geo series for the PlayStation 4, Xbox One, Nintendo Switch, Windows, Android and iOS.

The player controls a fighter spacecraft (Armored Scrum Object) and can shoot enemies in the air, bomb enemies on the ground, collect power-ups, and defeat bosses to advance levels.

== Gameplay ==
Gameplay screenshot showcasing the first boss.

The game controls uses 2 or 3 buttons used depending on the selected shuttle mode. The ship's armaments consist of air-to-air laser shots, air-to-ground missiles and any Power Weapons the player collects. The laser and missiles can be upgraded up to four times by collecting the powerups from drones that are shot. Power Weapons are available after the player collects three pieces of the same armour type or can be bought with credits acquired after each stage.

The weapons have limited power indicated on an energy meter. Using the weapons or getting the ship damaged lowers the energy. The energy can be recharged by collecting E power ups. Once the energy expires, the ship returns to normal mode. Depending on which mode is selected varies whether Button C or B activates the Power Weapons. Various hidden items can do certain things like an R item can put the shuttle in Reverse for a certain distance. The shuttle is destroyed by one shot or by running into an enemy unit or hazard. Unless the player collects enough K power-ups beforehand, the missiles and laser shots will be lost to minimum power when the player loses a life.

There are seven stages in the game, with the last one consisting of a single boss battle. The player has to fight through them avoiding hazards in addition. Mid-bosses occasionally appear in the game. When the player meets a mid-boss or end stage boss, the player must destroy weak points and various parts of the boss to destroy it.

== Reception ==
Reception

Review scores
Publication	Score
AllGame	(AC) 3.5/5 (NG) 2.5/5
Consoles +	(NG) 90%
Computer and Video Games	(NG) 88/100
GameFan	(NG) 334/400
Joypad	(NG) 94%
Joystick	(NG) 97%
Nintendo Life	(NS) 7/10
Nintendo World Report	(NS) 6/10
Player One	(NG) 94%
Sinclair User	(AC) 83%
TouchArcade	(iOS) 3.5/5
Game Zone	(AC) 2/5
Zero	(AC) 3.5/5

In Japan, Game Machine listed Alpha Mission II as the most popular arcade game of April 1991. Since its initial release in arcades, the game has been met with generally positive reception from critics.

AllGame's Paul Biondich regarded it as a worthy successor to the original Alpha Mission and praised its complex weapon system, crisp graphics and simple controls although Kyle Knight gave the game more mixed outlook, stating that the enemy designs were dated and the aforementioned weapon system was a detriment. Consoles Plus' Kaneda Kun and François Hermelin commended the presentation, sound design, playability and original weapon. Both Kun and Hermelin noted that the lack of unlimited continues prolongs the title's overall longevity. Computer and Video Games' Paul Rand gave positive remarks the visuals for its quality, sound, difficulty and playability. Rand also noted that the lack of unlimited continues made it worthwhile.

GameFan's four reviewers highlighted the visuals, soundtrack, bosses and weapon variety in a positive manner, deeming it to be better than Last Resort but not as good as Viewpoint. Both Joypad's Seb and Joystick's Jean-Marc Demoly gave very high praise to the graphics, animations, controls and sound. Likewise, Player One's Cyril Drevet commended the animated visuals, weapon system, sound difficulty and playability. Sinclair User's John Cook stated that its weapon system required thought to build them at their maximum state and attack enemies. Génération 4's Frank Ladoire and Consolemania's Piemarco Rosa highly praised the colorful and detailed graphics, anime-style soundtrack and playability. Game Zone's David Wilson reviewed the arcade version, regarding it to be a fun game, noting its weapon system and ability to equip weapons between levels. Zero's Doris Stokes also regarded the game to be fun but stated that the amount of action on-screen made it frenetic.

Nintendo Life's Damien McFerran stated that the Armor weapon system was interesting, praising the bosses but criticized the levels for being repetitive. In contrasts, Nintendo World Report's Casey Gibson stated that the power-up system was convoluted power-up system and criticized the level design for being bland.
