= Guerrilla War (video game) =

1987 video game

- North American arcade flyer
- Developer: SNK (Note: Commodore 64, and MS-DOS versions developed by Quicksilver Software; CPC and ZX Spectrum versions developed by Ocean Software.)
- Publisher: SNK: C64, MS-DOS Data East CPC, ZX Spectrum Imagine Software
- Director: Koji Obata
- Producer: Eikichi Kawasaki
- Programmer: Yukio Kaneda
- Composers: NES; Kazuhiro Nishida; Yoko Osaka; Toshikazu Tanaka
- Platforms: Arcade, Amstrad CPC, Commodore 64, MS-DOS, NES, ZX Spectrum
- Release: December 1987: Arcade; JP/NA: December 1987 NES; JP: December 26, 1988; NA: June 1989 CPC, ZX Spectrum; EU: 1988 C64; EU: 1988; NA: March 1989
- Genre: Run and gun
- Modes: Single-player, multiplayer

Guerrilla War, released in Japan as Guevara (Note: Japanese: ゲバラ, Hepburn: Gebara), is a 1987 run and gun video game developed and published by SNK for arcades. It was ported to the Amstrad CPC, Commodore 64, MS-DOS, Nintendo Entertainment System, and ZX Spectrum.

== Plot ==
Guerrilla War follows the adventures of two unnamed rebel commandos (Che Guevara and Fidel Castro in the Japanese version) as they raid an unnamed Caribbean island in order to free it from the rule of an unnamed tyrannical dictator. Along the way, players vanquish hordes of enemy soldiers while attempting to rescue hostages (with large score reductions for any hostages killed in the crossfire), collecting weapons from troopers and operating tanks.

== Releases ==
The arcade version, released by SNK in 1987, followed the format of Ikari Warriors (1986). Using eight-way rotary joysticks, the game allowed players to move their character in one direction while shooting in another.

The game was moderately successful and spawned ports onto home video game systems. Data East released home editions on the PC, and Commodore 64, while Imagine Software published the Amstrad CPC and ZX Spectrum ports in Europe. SNK in-house published a version for the NES/Famicom 8-bit console. Because of the limits of the home platforms, the home versions did not have the rotating joysticks. Both the arcade and home console versions were included on the SNK 40th Anniversary Collection. Hamster Corporation released the game as part of their Arcade Archives series for the Nintendo Switch and PlayStation 4 in March 2021.

The NES version's two-player simultaneous play, unlimited continues, and frantic action gave it an edge over its arcade predecessor. It received a perfect 5-star rating in the book Ultimate Nintendo: Guide to the NES Library 1985–1995 and is also available on PlayStation Network. This version features box cover art by Marc Ericksen, who was also responsible for the cover illustration for SNK's own Ikari Warriors III: The Rescue and P.O.W.

== Che Guevara connection ==
As the original title indicates, the game is based on the exploits of revolutionary Che Guevara, and the defeat of the Batista regime in Cuba in the late 1950s. In addition, player 2's character is Fidel Castro, who is ranked fifth in Electronic Gaming Monthly's list of the top ten video game politicians. Nevertheless, fearing anti-Communist sentiments in the West, SNK did a Language localization of the game's dialogue and instruction manual for its North American and European releases. The version of Guevara released for the Japanese Famicom is popular with video game collectors.

== Reception ==
In Japan, Game Machine listed Guerrilla War as the ninth most successful table arcade unit of January 1988.
