= Chopper I =

1988 video game

- Arcade flyer
- Developer: SNK
- Publisher: SNK
- Platform: Arcade
- Release: JP: June 1988; NA: July 1988
- Genre: Scrolling shooter
- Modes: Single-player, multiplayer

Chopper I, released in Japan as The Legend of Air Cavalry (Note: Japanese: 航空騎兵物語, Hepburn: Koukuu Kihei Monogatari), is a 1988 vertically scrolling shooter video game developed and published by SNK for arcades. It was released in Japan in June 1988 and in North America in July 1988. The game was later included as part of the SNK 40th Anniversary Collection. Hamster Corporation released the game as part of their Arcade Archives series for the Nintendo Switch and PlayStation 4, as well as their Arcade Archives 2 series for the PlayStation 5 and Xbox Series X/S in August 2025.

== Gameplay ==
Gameplay screenshot

Up to two players can control helicopters who navigate levels and defeat enemies. The player can shoot both soldiers on land and airborne vehicles with their ammunition; power-ups can be acquired to improve its firepower. Bosses occasionally dispel nets that render the helicopter temporarily immobile and unable to shoot.

== Reception ==
In Japan, Game Machine listed Chopper I on their July 15, 1988 issue as being the ninth most-successful table arcade unit of the month.
