= Shock Troopers: 2nd Squad =

1998 video game

- Developer: Saurus (Note: Ported to Macintosh and Microsoft Windows by DotEmu)
- Publisher: SNK
- Director: Kenji Ishimoto
- Producers: Nobuyuki Tanaka; Yasushi Okahara
- Designer: Mitsuki Saito
- Programmer: Yosuke Takasaki
- Artists: Kurara Kiri; Miwako Kojima
- Composer: Masaki Kase
- Series: Shock Troopers
- Platforms: Arcade, Neo Geo AES
- Release: Arcade: WW: November 6, 1998; Neo Geo AES: WW: June 24, 1999
- Genre: Run and gun
- Modes: Single-player, multiplayer
- Arcade system: Neo Geo MVS

Shock Troopers: 2nd Squad (Note: Japanese: ショックトルーパーズ セカンドスカッド, Hepburn: Shokku Torūpāzu: Sekando Sukaddo) is a 1998 run and gun video game developed by Saurus and published by SNK in 1998 for the Neo Geo arcade and home platforms. It is a sequel to Shock Troopers but otherwise has no narrative connection to the game. 2nd Squad was re-released for the Wii's Virtual Console service for North America in 2012. Hamster Corporation re-released the game as part of their ACA Neo Geo series for the PlayStation 4, Xbox One, Nintendo Switch, Windows, Android and iOS.

== Gameplay ==
Gameplay screenshot.

The gameplay system has been drastically changed because only four characters are selectable and there is no team mode from the first Shock Troopers. The graphics use pre-rendered sprites and the action is more violent. A major new feature is an ability to ride some vehicles, as in the Metal Slug games.

== Reception ==
Shock Troopers: 2nd Squad for the Neo Geo was given a positive review by Classic Game Room despite being considered not as good as its predecessor. According to Hardcore Gaming 101, "Shock Troopers: 2nd Squad is often viewed as a disappointing follow up the original. Just like with Gunstar Super Heroes, Shock Troopers: 2nd Squad really only makes the mistake of sharing its name with a superior game. If judged by itself, it is really a great game and if it had been released as a stand alone with a different name, it would be recognized as such, rather than as an inferior sequel." The Virtual Console release of the game received a score of 7/10 from Nintendo Life.
