= Bermuda Triangle (video game) =

1987 video game

- Arcade flyer
- Developer: SNK
- Publisher: SNK
- Platform: Arcade
- Release: JP/NA: February 1987
- Genre: Scrolling shooter
- Mode: Single-player

Bermuda Triangle (Note: Japanese: バミューダトライアングル, Hepburn: Bamyūda Toraianguru) is a 1987 vertically scrolling shooter video game developed and published by SNK for arcades. It was released in Japan and North America in February 1987.

The game was included in SNK Arcade Classics 0 and SNK 40th Anniversary Collection. Hamster Corporation released the game as part of their Arcade Archives series for the Nintendo Switch and PlayStation 4, as well as their Arcade Archives 2 series for the PlayStation 5 and Xbox Series X/S in December 2025.

== Gameplay ==
The player controls a time-traveling fighter jet and shoots enemies, collects power-ups, and defeats bosses to advance levels. As the player advances through levels, a bar increases in size, allowing the player to improve their defense and firepower. At the end of each level, the player must complete another lap in reverse to truly finish it.
