= Street Smart (video game) =

1989 video game

- North American arcade flyer
- Developer: SNK
- Publishers: SNK (Arcade); Treco (Genesis/Mega Drive)
- Platforms: Arcade, Sega Genesis
- Release: JP: July 1989; NA: September 1989; Sega Genesis; NA: June 1991; JP: July 19, 1991
- Genre: Fighting
- Modes: Single-player, multiplayer

Street Smart (Note: Japanese: ストリートスマート, Hepburn: Sutorīto Sumāto) is a 1989 fighting game developed and published by SNK for arcades. It was released in Japan in July 1989 and in North America in September 1989. A port to the Sega Genesis was released in 1991.

Hamster Corporation released the game as part of their Arcade Archives series for the Nintendo Switch and PlayStation 4, as well as their Arcade Archives 2 series for the Nintendo Switch 2, PlayStation 5, and Xbox Series X/S in April 2026.

== Gameplay ==
The gameplay is a fighting game with beat 'em up elements where the player can move in all eight directions in an arena fight and the player can kick, punch or do special moves. Unlike Technōs Japan's Double Dragon, River City Ransom and most beat 'em ups, the players fight in an enclosed arena space similar to the gameplay of Taito's Violence Fight and players can choose to fight as either of the two playable characters. Street Smart contributed to the genre by adding co-operative multiplayer for team battles against boss characters. The players will then have a "Grudge Match" in the next round to determine who gets a bonus life/points, but, otherwise, the two players can play through the entire game together. It also contributed to the genre by adding a simple combo system, the first of its kind, in which players can make normal moves that become part of a string of attacks.

=== Playable fighters ===
Karate Man (空手家 Karateka), a Japanese man dressed in a white karate gi. He is a martial arts expert with lightning quick attacks.
Crusher (クラッシャー Kurasshā), an American man dressed in a white tank top and blue leggings. He is a professional wrestler that sacrifices speed for stronger attacks.

== Genesis/Mega Drive port ==
Street Smart was ported to the Genesis/Mega Drive in 1991 by SNK themselves which went uncredited in the game despite the development team of this version being made entirely of SNK staff. The port was published by Treco and uses fewer (though brighter) colors. To compensate for the large sprites animating on screen, it features top and bottom black frames; the player's data is shown on the top bar, including a visible life bar for the opponent (which the arcade game lacks). The game implements a betting system where players can win money for winning a fight or throwing one (similar to the later PSP game The Con), as well as a new last boss.

The Genesis/Mega Drive port lacks the two players vs. the CPU mode (two players only fought onscreen in the Grudge Match after each taking turns against a CPU opponent). This was done due to memory limitations of the system at the time. In the Genesis/Mega Drive port, Karate Man wears a red gi instead of a white one. Both characters are also given a new spinning "power move" (by pressing all three buttons at once) that can take an enemy down in one hit but reduces the player's health. There are three endings to the game, depending upon if the players are broke or not when the final boss is defeated. Should players be "broke", the final image is that of the players in rags, sitting in the gutter. Attaining a respectable amount of money will see the character well dressed, in a fashionable car with an attractive girlfriend. If the character earns an outstanding amount of money (usually gained by gambling all winnings on the player to win before each round), he is shown as a made man with four girls, in an apartment full of money.

A final difference between the Genesis/Mega Drive port and the arcade game lies in the console version's ability to grant the player "points" at the end of each successful match that can be assigned to character attributes. The player can gain a larger life bar, greater speed or power to make their character a significantly more capable fighter by the end of the game.

== Reception ==
In Japan, Game Machine listed Street Smart on their October 1, 1989 issue as being the eleventh most-successful table arcade unit of the month.

Computer and Video Games wrote that the arcade game's controls seem "confusing at first", but had a positive impression of the game, rating it an 80% overall. They commented that it wasn't as fun as Violence Fight, but "still well worth playing".

== Legacy ==
The original arcade version is included in the 20 game compilation follow-up to SNK Arcade Classics Vol. 1, titled as SNK Arcade Classics Vol. 0, which was released in Japan on April 27, 2011. It is also part of the 2018 SNK 40th Anniversary Collection.

"City Streets", the background music, heard in the first stage was reused as the two-player battle theme for SNK's 1991 fighting game Fatal Fury: King of Fighters for the Neo Geo. Fatal Fury also reuses the co-op team battle and one-on-one Grudge Match concepts from Street Smart.
