= Ikari III: The Rescue =

1989 video game

- North American arcade flyer
- Developer: SNK
- Publisher: SNK
- Platforms: Arcade, Nintendo Entertainment System, MS-DOS, Commodore 64
- Release: JP/NA: March 1989
- Genres: Beat 'em up, Shooter, Platform games
- Modes: Single-player, multiplayer

Ikari III: The Rescue (also known as Ikari Warriors III: The Rescue), simply known as Ikari III (怒III) in Japan, is a 1989 beat 'em up video game developed and published by SNK for arcades. It was ported to the Nintendo Entertainment System, MS-DOS and Commodore 64. It is the third and final installment of the Ikari Warriors series after Ikari Warriors and Victory Road. The NES version was shown at the 1991 CES.

== Gameplay ==
Arcade version gameplay

Unlike the previous two run and gun-style entries in the series, Ikari III is purely a beat 'em up. Firearms are only found in the form of 20-round machine guns able to be picked up from enemies, making combat primarily focused on hand-to-hand combat consisting of punching, kicking, jump kicks and roundhouse kicks.

The NES version maintains the same core gameplay as the arcade original, but alters stage layouts and ditches the Rambo-inspired aesthetic for anime-style character designs. The run and gun gameplay of its predecessors was also partially restored in the NES port, as vehicle bosses are fought exclusively with infinite-ammo machine guns.

The NES port additionally features an exclusive fourth side-scrolling shooter stage, which has Paul and Vince scuba-diving.

== Story ==
It is the second sequel to the original Ikari Warriors, following Victory Road.

=== Arcade version ===
The presidential candidate's son has been kidnapped by an enemy terrorist party that opposes changes. Fearing political and internal uproar should the news be exposed, top officials of the candidate have asked the best two-soldier army to secretly take action on this matter.

Using falsified tips and information to send the main force of enemy terrorists on a wild goose chase, Ralf Jones and Clark Still commences their mission called "The Rescue". The two brawl their way through the enemy guards and destroys their heavy weaponry patrolling area of stage 1. The main enemy force quickly realized however, that they were given a false tip and hastened their way back to capture or kill Ralf and Clark. From here on Ralf and Clark would continue fighting and advancing to where the captive is being held, with the main enemy army following the pair right on their heels. This would serve as a kind of time limit to the game: If the distance between the pursuing enemy army and the Ikari Warriors reaches 0km, the Ikari Warriors would be taken prisoners and the rescue mission would be deemed a failure, restarting the entire stage over again where the heroes were captured.

After killing the captors of the President's son in stage 3, Ralf and Clark secure the hostage and request to be extracted, only to be ambushed by the troops of Crime Ghost along with their rescue helicopter being shot down. The soldiers of Crime Ghost then recapture the hostage and take him further away from the rescuers themselves. But no matter: after venturing into more hostile territories Ralf and Clark in the end defeat all the soldiers of Crime Ghost and this time secure the captive boy.

But there's one more mission to be fulfilled: Ralf and Clark now must move to the extraction point with the boy in tow, and the remaining soldiers of Crime Ghost would do everything in their power to stop them from reaching the rescue plane. And the main army of Crime Ghost is still following closely behind the three of them.

After the final mission's successfully completed Ralf and Clark manage to secure the boy and ride home in the rescue plane back to their home country. Because their mission was top-secret to begin with, Ralf and Clark's deed will never be known to the public.

(After the failure of Crime Ghost's plans, it's unknown what happened to them thereafter.)

=== NES version ===
Crime Ghost is a terrorist organization which emerged after a worldwide economic recession at the end of the 20th century. Composed of dangerous criminals and disgruntled soldiers, it has already infiltrated most countries of the world to spread its influence, seeking to take over the world and plunge it into chaos and anarchy.

The president of an unnamed country decides to fight them, creating a secret plan to destroy the evil organization, but somehow they learn about his plans and attack the president's house, along with kidnapping his daughter Elise. They then send a blackmail letter to the president, asking him to resign his position in a number of days or else they will have Elise executed. Desperate, the president hires Paul and Vince, the Ikari Warriors, and sends them to infiltrate Crime Ghost's hideout, rescue Elise and defeat their megalomaniacal leader.

(From here on, with some few original tweaks, the story of the NES version is identical to the arcade game's counterpart. However, unlike the arcade version Paul and Vince must have a final showdown against Faust, the supreme leader of Crime Ghost at the final extraction point.)

== Development ==
The game was inspired by the release of the movie Rambo III (1988), where Sylvester Stallone's titular character appeared more stronger and tougher than ever, and the film properly showcased John Rambo's hand-to-hand combat skills without him rushing to kill tough soldiers. SNK aimed for going the same direction with Ralf and Clark in Ikari III.

While the game still uses the rotary joystick like the previous Ikari Warriors games, an 8-way directional version exists that forgoes the rotary feature altogether, in which the mechanics are similar to SNK's previous cooperative arcade-to-NES beat 'em up, P.O.W.: Prisoners of War (1988).

== Legacy ==
=== Other games ===
The characters Ralf and Clark appeared again as playable characters in Metal Slug 6 and 7, as well as in The King of Fighters series. Their names were used for two minor unrelated characters in Crystalis, and they were featured as cameos in Super Smash Bros. Ultimate as background characters in the King of Fighters Stadium stage.

=== Re-releases ===
The game is included in SNK 40th Anniversary Collection. Hamster Corporation released the game as part of their Arcade Archives series for the Nintendo Switch and PlayStation 4 on March 26, 2020.
