= Solitary Fighter =

1991 video game

- Developer: Taito
- Publisher: Taito
- Platform: Arcade
- Release: 1991
- Genre: Fighting
- Modes: Single-player, multiplayer

Solitary Fighter (Note: Japanese: ソリタリーファイター, Hepburn: Soritarī Faitā) is a 1991 fighting video game developed and published by Taito for arcades. It was initially not released in Japan, only in North America, in 1991. It is the sequel to the 1989 game Violence Fight.

Taito released the game outside Japan as part of their Taito Milestones 2 collection for the Nintendo Switch in August 2023. Hamster Corporation released the game as part of their Arcade Archives series for the Nintendo Switch and PlayStation 4 in December 2023.

== Gameplay ==
Solitary Fighter plays similarly to other beat 'em ups like Double Dragon, Renegade and River City Ransom, where the player can move in all eight directions in an arena fight. The player can punch, kick and jump in an enclosed arena. Players can combine jump with either punch or kick to perform stronger versions of either move, or combine punch and kick to duck attacks. Weapons are available, which have increased range and damage over normal attacks. Members of the audience can occasionally join and assist the player or their opponent.
