= Violence Fight =

1989 video game

- European arcade flyer
- Developer: Taito
- Publisher: Taito
- Designer: Yukihiko Sakamoto
- Programmers: Takeshi Ishizashi; Yumi Inoue
- Composer: Zuntata
- Platform: Arcade
- Release: JP: December 1989; NA: January 1990
- Genre: Fighting
- Modes: Single-player, multiplayer
- Arcade system: Taito B System

Violence Fight (Note: Japanese: バイオレンスファイト, Hepburn: Baiorensu Faito) is a 1989 fighting video game developed and published by Taito for arcades. It was released in Japan in December 1989 and in North America in January 1990. It was followed by a sequel, Solitary Fighter, in 1991, which was not released in Japan.

Violence Fight is included in the Taito Memories Vol. 2 compilation for PlayStation 2 and Taito Legends 2 for PlayStation 2, Xbox, and Microsoft Windows. Hamster Corporation released the game as part of their Arcade Archives series for the Nintendo Switch and PlayStation 4 in October 2024.

== Gameplay ==
Violence Fight plays similarly to other beat 'em ups like Double Dragon, Renegade and River City Ransom, where the player can move in all eight directions in an arena fight. Also, there are three buttons: punch, kick and jump. However, unlike most side-scrolling fighters, the players fight in an enclosed arena space. Players can press either punch + jump or kick + jump to perform either a special punch or a special kick move. Players also can press punch + kick to duck for a short period of time. While the opponent is struggling to get up, the punch button can be used to throw him to the ground for some damage. The punch button is also used to pick up crates, barrels and other similar objects.

Each match consists of up to three rounds. The timer will initially be set at 100 seconds, or 1 minute, 40 seconds. The objective is to get opponent's life meter to zero to win a round. Winning two out of three rounds will win the match. Each brawler begins the round with 100 health points. Direct hits to opponent will reduce his health gradually, based on certain factors. For each round won, the players gain one point towards winning the match. If time runs out in a round, the round will end in a draw. If two of three rounds end in a draw, the brawler with only one point will be the winner. If the point totals are tied at the end of all three rounds, the match ends in a draw. If the players gets more points than the opponent, they will continue on to the next gameplay round, or "stage" of the game. If the opponent has more points than the player, the game is over and there is the option of continuing the game, at the cost of one additional coin. If the match ends in a draw against the CPU, it will be the same as a loss. If the match ends in a draw of a 2-player match, either player will have to insert another coin to continue the single-player campaign.

== Characters ==
There are four playable fighters, and two unplayable bosses.

- Bad Blue (バッド・ブルー, Baddo Burū), or "Bat Blue" – A yesteryear street fighting champion from Los Angeles, California. As far as attributes are concerned, he is the most well-balanced and skillful. He is partnered with Blinks, who acts as his manager.
- Ben Smith (ベン・スミス, Ben Sumisu), or "B. Smith" – An African-American U.S. Marine veteran from Carson City, Nevada. His fighting style is boxing. During his career as a Marine, Ben was nicknamed "Fierce Eagle" because of his speed and reflexes, though all of his other attributes are lower than average.
- Rick Joe (リック・ジョー, Rikku Jō), or "Lick Joe" – A professional wrestler from Ardmore, Oklahoma who was expelled from the Taito Wrestling Federation (TWF, a parody of the World Wrestling Federation) for killing thirteen opponents in sanctioned matches. Joe, who bears some resemblance to real-life wrestler Gorgeous George, enters the tournament hoping to redeem himself of his past deeds.
- Lee Chen (リー・チェン, Rī Chen) – A mysterious Chinese martial artist from Miami, Florida. Although a natural-born U.S. citizen, Lee spent many of his childhood summers visiting China with his father, who taught him the art of kung fu.

=== Bosses ===
- Ron Max (ロン・マックス, Ron Makkusu) – A stock farmer from San Antonio, Texas who is known for his headbutts. He wears a red and white-striped tank top and blue jeans. When the player fights against him, the audience will throw empty beer bottles into the ring, causing unnecessary setbacks to the player's plans to win the bout.
- Tony Won (トニー・ウォン, Tonī Uon) – A tall New Yorker who resembles Mr. T. He goes to great and sometimes unorthodox lengths to win, like swinging a chain at his opponents. Tony is also the leader of the Black Will'O gang, the organization who set up the Violence Fight tournament in the first place. Although an African-American, his name also suggests that he could be of Chinese descent.

== Reception ==
In Japan, Game Machine listed Violence Fight on their January 15, 1990 issue as being the thirteenth most-successful table arcade unit of the month.

== See also ==
- Street Smart (video game)
