= Prehistoric Isle 2 =

1999 video game

- Developers: Saurus; Yumekobo
- Publisher: SNK
- Producers: James H. Woan; Nobuyuki Tanaka; Shuji Takaoka
- Designer: Barso
- Programmer: Masaaki Yuki
- Artists: Tomonori Nagakubo; Y. Yonezawa
- Composer: Masahiko Hataya
- Platform: Arcade
- Release: WW: September 27, 1999
- Genre: Scrolling shooter
- Modes: Single-player, multiplayer
- Arcade system: Neo Geo MVS

Prehistoric Isle 2 (Note: Also known as Prehistoric Isle 2: Primitive Island (Japanese: プレヒストリックアイル２: 原始島, Hepburn: Purehisutorikku Airu 2: Genshi-Tō) in Japan.) is a 1999 scrolling shooter video game co-developed by Saurus and Yumekobo and published by SNK for the Neo Geo arcade platform. It is the sequel to the original Prehistoric Isle, which was developed and released earlier in 1989 by SNK. In the game, players take control of helicopters to shoot at dinosaurs while rescuing people. Although first launched in arcades, the title has since been re-released through download services for various consoles. It received mixed reception since its initial arcade release and garnered less success than its predecessor.

== Gameplay ==
Gameplay screenshot.

Prehistoric Isle 2 is a scrolling shoot 'em up game reminiscent of its predecessor where players take control of helicopters to fight against dinosaurs while rescuing people through various stages. The players control their helicopter over a constantly scrolling background and the scenery never stops moving until a boss that must be fought before progressing any further is reached.

== Development and release ==
A sequel to the original Prehistoric Isle was teased at the end of its credits sequence, but was not officially announced by SNK until a decade later. Masanori Kuwasashi, director of The King of Fighters '94 and The King of Fighters '95, submitted a proposal he worked with Samurai Shodown designer Yasushi Adachi for the sequel after the release of Quiz Meitantei Neo & Geo: Quiz Daisōsasen Part 2 (1992), but was initially rejected by SNK's management. Prehistoric Isle 2 was co-developed by Saurus and Yumekobo, with James H. Woan, Nobuyuki Tanaka and Shuji Takaoka at the helm as producers. Masaaki Yuki acted as main programmer, while a planner under the pseudonym of "Barso" served as designer alongside Tomonori Nagakubo and Y. Yonezawa, in addition of Masahiko Hataya acting as composer. Several staff members also collaborated with the project. The game was first released by SNK for the Neo Geo MVS board on September 27, 1999. Hamster Corporation re-released the game as part of their ACA Neo Geo series for the PlayStation 4, Xbox One, Nintendo Switch, Windows, Android and iOS.

== Reception ==
Reception

Review scores
Publication	Score
Nintendo Life	(Switch) 6/10
Retro	(ARC) 3.5/5
Video Chums	(Switch) 4/5

Prehistoric Isle 2 garnered less success than its predecessor. Eric C. Mylonas of GameFan gave the arcade version an overall mixed outlook.
