= Shock Troopers =

1997 video game

- Developers: Saurus; DotEmu (PC)
- Publisher: SNK
- Director: Yasushi Okahara
- Producer: Nobuyuki Tanaka
- Designer: Kenji Ishimoto
- Programmers: Daiyoshi Sato; Takashi Shishido; Yosuke Takasaki
- Artists: Hideo Akimoto; Kaori Ito; Masato Miyoshi
- Composers: Masahiko Hataya; Masaki Kase
- Platform: Arcade
- Release: JP: November 11, 1997; NA: January 1998
- Genre: Run and gun
- Modes: Single-player, multiplayer
- Arcade system: Neo Geo MVS

Shock Troopers (Note: Japanese: ショックトルーパーズ, Hepburn: Shokku Torūpāzu) is a 1997 run and gun video game developed by Saurus and published by SNK for the Neo Geo arcade platform. Gameplay involves taking command of one or three soldiers in an eight-way shooter. A second game in the series, Shock Troopers: 2nd Squad, followed up in 1998.

== Gameplay ==
Gameplay screenshot.

At the beginning of each session, players choose whether to go through the game in one of two modes, "Lonely Wolf" or "Team Battle". In "Lonely Wolf", one character is controlled throughout the game, while "Team Battle" allows selecting a band of three soldiers through their missions, switching between them on-the-fly. Choosing to go it alone gives a higher starting life total, while proceeding as a team will give a wider variety of special weapons as well as a higher starting total (ten for each of the three characters instead of twenty for one).

At the beginning of the game, there is also a choice to travel through the Mountain, Jungle, or Valley route. Halfway through the game, a different route can optionally be chosen otherwise stay on the current path. Characters and paths chosen determine how much life bonus is received at the beginning of each level. Each stage is interspersed with boss battles (both in the middle and at the end of each stage). Until the very end, battling the enemy commander atop an aircraft.

Each character has their own virtues over other selections. Some might start with higher life totals, while others could move faster. Regardless of choice, the soldiers each possess a unique special weapon or "bomb", which varies in distance and range. Controls consist of an eight-way joystick and four buttons. Players move in eight directions with the joystick and fire, do evasive maneuvers, use their special weapon, and switch characters with the A, B, C, and D buttons, respectively.

Players must progress through seven levels, each ending in a boss fight. The weapons can be fired in all eight directions, but holding down the fire button allows strafing. Attacking within close range of an enemy will yield items, including point bonuses, weapon power-ups, and life. Enemy fire can be avoided with the dodge button. In "Team Battle" mode, the three selected soldiers can be cycled to utilize the traits and special weapons of each.

== Plot ==
The Bloody Scorpions terrorist group have kidnapped scientist George Diamond and his granddaughter Cecilia Diamond in order to gain the powerful drug, Alpha-301, which converts normal people into superhuman soldiers. A special team composed of eight soldiers from different countries must fight through their ranks in order to get to their leader and save the scientist's granddaughter and the world. (The sequel, Shock Troopers: 2nd Squad, has a completely unrelated story and different characters.)

== Ports and re-releases ==
Shock Troopers was included in SNK Arcade Classics Vol. 1, a video game compilation for PlayStation 2, PlayStation Portable and Wii.

SNK Playmore released ports for PlayStation 3 and PlayStation Portable developed by M2 on August 25, 2011, on PlayStation Network via NEOGEO Station.

D4 Enterprise developed and published a port for the Virtual Console for Wii, which was released in Japan on May 22, 2012; in North America on October 25, 2012; and in Europe on November 8, 2012.

A port developed by DotEmu for Microsoft Windows, OS X, Linux and asm.js was released by SNK Playmore as part of the Humble NEOGEO 25th Anniversary Bundle on December 8, 2015. It was released on Steam on May 18, 2016, and on GOG.com on May 30, 2017. Hamster Corporation re-released the game as part of their ACA Neo Geo series for the PlayStation 4, Xbox One, Nintendo Switch, Windows, Android and iOS.

== Reception ==
In Japan, Game Machine listed Shock Troopers as the thirteenth most successful arcade game of December 1998.

The game was very well received. Classic Game Room described Shock Troopers for the PlayStation 3 as an "amazing" shooter with "fantastic" gameplay, controls, and the best game of 2011, despite being just a re-release. Nintendo Life's Corbie Dillard scored the Virtual Console release a 7/10 and opined it "succeeds in offering up an intense and explosive run-and-gun experience." Digitally Downloaded reviewer awarded it four-and-half stars out of five, stating: "If you’ve never played a run-n’-gun shooter before, Shock Troopers should be one of your top contenders, regardless of your skill level." According to Hardcore Gaming 101, unlike the version included in SNK Arcade Classics Vol. 1, the VC version "runs almost perfectly." The website especially hailed the game's "fantastic presentation that ranks among the best in the genre."
