= Last Resort (video game) =

1992 video game

- Arcade flyer
- Developer: SNK
- Publisher: SNK
- Producer: Yasumi Tozono
- Designers: Eri Koujitani; Hajime Itō; Khozoh Nagashima
- Programmer: Takefumi Yamamoto
- Composers: Toshio Shimizu; Yasuo Yamate
- Platforms: Arcade, Neo Geo AES, Neo Geo CD
- Release: Arcade: WW: March 23, 1992; Neo Geo AES: WW: April 24, 1992; Neo Geo CD: JP: September 9, 1994; NA: October 1996
- Genre: Scrolling shooter
- Modes: Single-player, multiplayer
- Arcade system: Neo Geo MVS

Last Resort (Note: Japanese: ラスト・リゾート, Hepburn: Rasuto Rizōto) is a 1992 horizontally scrolling shooter video game developed and published by SNK for the Neo Geo arcade and home platforms. It was ported to the Neo Geo AES and Neo Geo CD consoles, and was later re-released as part of SNK Arcade Classics Vol. 1 for the PlayStation 2, PlayStation Portable, and Wii. Hamster Corporation re-released the game as part of their ACA Neo Geo series for the PlayStation 4, Xbox One, Nintendo Switch, Windows, Android and iOS.

== Gameplay ==
Brucken, the first boss

The object of the game is to fight through five stages (twice) and destroy the end stage bosses by aiming for their weak points. The player controls a cyber jet and (once procured) an indestructible robot drone which acts both as a shield against small projectiles (similar to the Dino 246 drone in Pulstar and Blazing Star) and an additional weapon with multi-directional fire and concussion launch capabilities. The robot drone can be toggled to a stoptrack position or to rotate around the cyber jet. The cyber jet can be upgraded with three levels of three types of firepower and faster jet speed by collecting the corresponding power-ups.

== Plot ==
In the future, mankind has developed the technology for space colonization. However, a mysterious computer virus infects the primary computer running man's first space station, causing it not only to affect its automated defenses, but to convince other humans to side with it. The computer attacks Earth so often that Earth's only hope is put into advanced spaceships wielding great firepower.

== Development ==
Last Resort was developed by former Irem staff members.

== Reception ==
Reception

Review scores
Publication	Score
AllGame	(NG) 2.5/5
Consoles +	(NG) 95%
Electronic Gaming Monthly	(NG) 21/40
HobbyConsolas	(NG) 94/100
Joypad	(NG) 90%
Joystick	(NG) 92%
Nintendo Life	(NS) 8/10
Player One	(NG) 91%
Consolemania	(NG) 85/100
Gamest	(AC) 45/70
Power Play	(NG) 89%
Ultimate Future Games	(NGCD) 87%
VideoGames	(NG) 5/10

Last Resort garnered positive reception from seven reviewers of Gamest during its 1992 AOU Show appearance. In Japan, Game Machine listed it as the thirteenth most popular arcade game of May 1992. In North America, RePlay listed it as the sixteenth most popular arcade game of May 1992. The game has received generally positive reception from critics since its release in arcades and other platforms, with some comparing it to R-Type. Other reviewers also drew visual comparison with the 1988 film Akira.

Consoles Plus's Marc Menier and Douglas of Consoles Plus praised the visual presentation, sound design, playability and longevity, regarding it as a referencial shoot 'em up for Neo Geo. Electronic Gaming Monthly's four reviewers panned the Neo Geo AES version, commenting that it has impressive graphics and sounds, but crippling slowdown and extremely short length, problems they found especially unforgivable given the console's powerful hardware and the cartridge's high price. Hobby Consolas' Marcos García highly commended the graphics, music and two-player mode, but criticized the lack of an additional stage and occasional slowdown during gameplay. Joypad's Jean-François Morisse and Joystick's Jean-Marc Demoly gave positive remarks to the graphics, sprite animations, sound and controls.

Player One's Cyril Drevet stated that the power-up system was a mixture of R-Type and Forgotten Worlds and criticized the occurrence of slowdown during gameplay, comparing it with those of popular shoot 'em ups on the Super NES, but nevertheless praised the visuals, sound, difficulty and longevity. Consolemania' Davide Corrado commended the graphics, sound and playability, but criticized its high difficulty level. Power Play's Martin Gaksch regarded it as the best classic-style shooter since R-Type and its sequel for arcades and consoles, praising the title's ingenuity, audiovisual presentation, and action.

Ultimate Future Games reviewed the Neo Geo CD version and praised the graphically detailed sprites and stages, opera-style rave soundtrack, sound effects and action, but criticized its short length. VideoGames & Computer Entertainment's Andy Eddy criticized the occurrence of slowdown and flickering, short length and difficulty. Nintendo Life's Damien McFerran compared its dark atmosphere with both R-Type and Armed Police Unit Gallop, praising its soundtrack and challenge, regarding it as one of the best shooters on Neo Geo, but criticized the two-player mode for being broken and other aspects. In 2014, HobbyConsolas identified it as one of the twenty best games for the Neo Geo CD. Likewise, Time Extension also listed it as one of the best games for the Neo Geo.
