= Prehistoric Isle =

1989 video game

- Developer: SNK
- Publisher: SNK
- Director: Yah!
- Producer: Eikichi Kawasaki
- Designers: Hideki Fujiwara; Violetche Nakamoto; Tomomi M.
- Programmers: Itsam Matarca; Takoguti Kamen 001
- Composers: Toshikazu Tanaka; Yoko Osaka
- Platform: Arcade
- Release: JP: May 1989; NA: June 1989; EU: 1989
- Genre: Scrolling shooter
- Modes: Single-player, multiplayer

Prehistoric Isle (Note: Also known as Genshi-Tō (Japanese: 原始島; Primitive Island) in Japan, and as Genshi-Tō 1930's and Prehistoric Isle in 1930 on Japanese and Western title screens, respectively.) is a 1989 scrolling shooter video game developed and published by SNK for arcades. Set during the 1930s, where ships at The Bahamas mysteriously disappeared, players assume the role of U.S. Marine pilots taking control of biplanes in a reconnaissance assignment at "Greenhell Isle", a fictional island inhabited by dinosaurs and creatures thought to be extinct. Headed by a director under the pseudonym of "Yah!", the game was developed by most of the same team that would later work on several projects for the Neo Geo platforms at SNK. First launched in arcades, the title has since been re-released through download services and compilations for various consoles. It received positive reception since its initial arcade release from critics who praised the visuals, sound design, gameplay and originality. A sequel, Prehistoric Isle 2, was released in 1999 for the Neo Geo MVS but garnered less success than its predecessor.

== Gameplay ==
Gameplay screenshot

Prehistoric Isle is a scrolling shoot 'em up game reminiscent of R-Type where players assume the role of U.S. Marine pilots taking control of biplanes, which are sent on a reconnaissance assignment through five increasingly difficult stages at "Greenhell Isle", a fictional island inhabited by dinosaurs and creatures thought to be extinct. The players control their plane over a constantly scrolling background and the scenery never stops moving until a boss that must be fought before progressing any further is reached. Players have only one weapon at their disposal: the standard shot that travels a max distance of the screen's length. A gameplay feature is the satellite "option"; when collecting a "P" icon by destroying dinosaur eggs, the players gain a satellite "option" similar to R-Type, which fires multiple types of weapons depending on its current stoptrack position. Various other items can also be picked up along the way such as speed increasers and "$" icons for points. If the player's plane is hit by enemies, enemy fire or enough neanderthals climb onto it, a life is lost but they will be respawned with the penalty of decreasing the plane's firepower to its original state.

== Plot ==
In the 1930s, ships that sailed near The Bahamas began to disappear mysteriously, with the United States and neighbor countries deciding to task an investigation team from the U.S. Marine to determine the cause. When surveying the ocean, the expedition crew comes across an uncharted land dubbed "Greenhell Isle" and launches two reconnaissance biplanes to examine further. During their research, the biplanes come under attack by dinosaurs and creatures thought to be extinct.

== Development and release ==
Prehistoric Isle was created by most of the same team that would later work on several projects for the Neo Geo platforms at SNK. Its development was helmed by a director under the pseudonym of "Yah!", with Eikichi Kawasaki serving as producer. The coding work was handled by two programmers under the pseudonyms of Itsam Matarca and Takoguti Kamen 001 respectively. Hideki Fujiwara, Violetche Nakamoto, Tomomi M. and "Yokochan" acted as the project's designers. The soundtrack was co-written by Shinsekai Gakkyoku Zatsugidan composers Toshikazu Tanaka and Yoko Osaka, with Tanaka writing the names of each music track.

Prehistoric Isle was first released in arcades across Japan, North America and Europe by SNK in 1989. Prior to launch, it was showcased in a playable state at the 1989 AOU Show. The same year on September 21, an album containing its soundtrack was co-published exclusively in Japan by Scitron and Pony Canyon. The game was first re-released by SNK Playmore in Japan as part of the SNK Arcade Classics 0 compilation for PlayStation Portable in 2011. Later during the same year, the title was later ported to PlayStation Network by G1M2. It was also included as part of the SNK 40th Anniversary Collection compilation. Hamster Corporation released the arcade version as part of their Arcade Archives series for the Nintendo Switch and PlayStation 4, as well as their Arcade Archives 2 series for the PlayStation 5 and Xbox Series X/S in October 2026.

== Reception ==
Reception

Review scores
Publication	Score	
Publication	Arcade	PSP
AllGame	3/5	N/A
Computer and Video Games	81%	N/A
Jeuxvideo.com	N/A	13/20
Sinclair User	10/10	N/A
Génération 4	9/10	N/A
PSP Minis	N/A	9/10
Retro Gamer	N/A	4/5

Prehistoric Isle was met with positive reception since its initial launch in arcades. In Japan, Game Machine listed it on their July 1, 1989 issue as being the sixth most-successful table arcade unit of the month, outperforming titles such as Arbalester, Crack Down and Dynasty Wars.

== Sequel ==
A sequel to Prehistoric Isle had already been teased during its credits sequence. Prehistoric Isle 2 was released in 1999 for the Neo Geo MVS but proved to be less popular than its predecessor.
