= Top Hunter: Roddy & Cathy =

1994 video game

- Developer: SNK
- Publisher: SNK
- Producer: Eikichi Kawasaki
- Designers: M. Matsuda; Y. Hashimoto; Yasumi Tozono
- Programmers: Data Tada; Imasa.F; Sho Chan
- Artists: Chikara Yamasaki; Eri Koujitani; Hirolin Hajime
- Composers: Akihiro Uchida; Masahiko Hataya; Toshio Shimizu
- Platforms: Arcade, Neo Geo AES, Neo Geo CD
- Release: Arcade: WW: May 18, 1994; Neo Geo AES: WW: June 24, 1994; Neo Geo CD: JP: September 29, 1994; NA: October 1996
- Genres: Beat 'em up, Platform
- Modes: Single-player, multiplayer
- Arcade system: Neo Geo MVS

Top Hunter: Roddy & Cathy (Note: Japanese: トップ・ハンター ～ロディー & キャシー～, Hepburn: Toppu Hantā ~ Rodī& Kyashī ~; Top Hunter ~ Lodi & Kathy ~) is a 1994 beat 'em up video game developed and published by SNK for the Neo Geo arcade and home platforms. It was also released on the Neo Geo CD, and the Wii Virtual Console. The game has been re-released as part of SNK Arcade Classics Vol. 1, on May 1, 2008. Hamster Corporation re-released the game as part of their ACA Neo Geo series for the PlayStation 4, Xbox One, Nintendo Switch, Windows, Android and iOS. Its development team consisted of former Irem staff members.

It was one of the few Neo Geo games to be dubbed "the 100 mega shock", due to the cartridge being just over 112 mebibits. This was large for the time, at over twice the size of the largest SNES cartridge (Star Ocean, with 48 mebibits). Later cartridges would routinely top 100 megabits so the branding was dropped. This was also referred to as a precursor to Metal Slug because of the cartoonish graphics and the robotic vehicles, which are very similar to the Slugs.

== Gameplay ==
Gameplay screenshot.

The gameplay style is similar to and inspired by Double Dragon, The Combatribes, Joe & Mac and Spinmaster. The player characters (Roddy for Player 1 and Cathy for Player 2) must navigate through the area, collecting items, killing enemies, and defeating a boss at the end of each stage. The characters can also execute special moves, done by moving the joystick in certain directions and pressing the attack button, similar to Street Fighter and The King of Fighters fame. Similar to Fatal Fury, Top Hunter features a plane-jumping system: the game field is divided in two lanes between the background and foreground, which the player can jump between at any time to attack enemies or avoid traps. The two fields are not always at the same elevation and one of them may be blocked off at certain points.

The game is split into four planets: Forest, Ice, Wind, and Fire. Depending on what stage is picked first, the layout of the stage will change. For example, if the player picks the Ice world before the Forest world, the Forest world's beginning layout will be different. After completing all 4 worlds, the player is taken to the final stage, where they must rematch with the four bosses and battle the game's antagonist, Captain Klapton.

Players can change various settings such as game difficulty, and also reproduce the atmosphere of arcade display settings at that time. Players can also compete against each other from all over the world with their high scores.

== Synopsis ==
The galaxy's top bounty hunters Roddy and Cathy are sent to put a stop to a colony of galactic pirates called the Klaptons who threaten and plunder the cosmos. Four high-ranking members of the Klaptons have taken control of four elemental planets. Big rewards are offered for the captures of Sly, Misty, Mr. Bigman and Dr. Burn. The top hunters battle their forces and destroy the commanders' war machines but they all get away. In the Last Hunt, Roddy and Cathy will have to battle in Captain Klapton's Mothership, defeat the four commanders again and take care of the captain once and for all.

== Reception ==
Contemporary reception

Aggregate score
Aggregator	Score
GameRankings	(Neo Geo) 73%

Review scores
Publication	Score
Edge	(Neo Geo) 5 / 10
Electronic Gaming Monthly	(Neo Geo) 7 / 10
Famitsu	(Neo Geo) 24 / 40
Consoles +	(Neo Geo) 86%
Hobby Consolas	(Neo Geo) 92 / 100
Hobby Hi-Tech	(Neo Geo CD) 8 / 10
Joypad	(Neo Geo) 92%
MAN!AC	(Neo Geo) 69%
Megablast	(Neo Geo) 75%
Mega Fun	(Neo Geo) 84%
Neo Geo Freak	(Arcade) 8 / 20
Play Time	(Neo Geo) 85 / 100
Player One	(Neo Geo) 77%
Superjuegos	(Neo Geo) 91 / 100
Video Games	(Neo Geo) 75%
VideoGames	(Neo Geo) 7 / 10

In North America, RePlay reported Top Hunter: Roddy & Cathy to be the sixteenth most-popular arcade game at the time. On release, Famitsu scored the Neo Geo version of Top Hunter a 24 out of 40. The four reviewers of Electronic Gaming Monthly gave it a 7 out of 10 average. Two of the reviewers criticized that "the difficulty, even on the hardest setting, is still way too easy", allowing players to breeze through the game very quickly, and thus making it a poor value given the high price of Neo Geo cartridges. However, all four felt that the game was very enjoyable for its brief length due to its numerous techniques, outstanding graphics, bizarre bosses, orchestral music, and ability to move between the foreground and background. Spanish magazine Superjuegos, in its 31st edition, scored the game with a score of 91 out of a maximum of 100, highlighting the graphic work especially with the level bosses and the two planes that the game has.

=== Retrospective reviews ===
Retrospective assessments

Aggregate score
Aggregator	Score
GameRankings	(Switch) 80%

Review scores
Publication	Score
Eurogamer	(Wii) 7 / 10
IGN	(Wii) 7.0 / 10
Nintendo Life	(Wii) 8/10 (Switch) 8/10
MAN!AC	(Wii) 6 / 10

Top Hunter: Roddy & Cathy has been met with mixed reception from retrospective reviewers.

In 2014, HobbyConsolas identified Top Hunter as one of the twenty best games for the Neo Geo AES.
