= Crystalis =

1990 video game

- Box art from the original NES release
- Developers: SNK (NES); Nintendo Software Technology (Game Boy Color)
- Publishers: SNK (NES); Nintendo of America (Game Boy Color)
- Director: Kazuto Kohno
- Producer: Kazuto Kohno
- Programmers: Yukio Gu; F. Sasami; Satoru Okada
- Artists: T. Furuta; M. Yamashita; Yoshihisa Maeda; T. Tokyo
- Writers: J. Satoh; H. Kino; Kiyoji Tomita
- Composer: Yoko Osaka
- Platforms: Nintendo Entertainment System, Game Boy Color
- Release: Nintendo Entertainment System: JP: April 13, 1990; NA: July 1990; Game Boy Color: NA: June 26, 2000
- Genres: Action role-playing, action-adventure
- Mode: Single-player

Crystalis (Note: Known in Japan as God Slayer: Haruka Tenkū no Sonata (Japanese: ゴッド・スレイヤー はるか天空のソナタ; lit. "God Slayer: Sonata of the Far Away Sky").) is a 1990 action role-playing video game developed and published by SNK for the Nintendo Entertainment System. A port for the Game Boy Color developed by Nintendo Software Technology and published by Nintendo was released in 2000.

The game begins with a young magician awakening from the cryogenic sleep he was placed in by the villains of the Great War before nuclear war rained down in the year 1997. Even though he is unable to recall his name or who he was, he exits the Mezame Shrine and discovers that he may be the key to save this world from destruction. Aided by four wise sages and a mysterious woman, he rises up against the tyrannical Draygonian Empire to ensure that humanity ultimately does not repeat the Great War.

The original NES version has been re-released via the SNK 40th Anniversary Collection on Nintendo Switch, PlayStation 4, Windows, and Xbox One.

== Gameplay ==
Crystalis gameplay, in the town called Portoa

Crystalis is an action role-playing game. The world is presented in a top-down perspective so the player character can be moved in eight directions using the control pad. One action button is used for attacking with a sword while the second is mapped to either an equipped magical power or an item from the player's inventory. The start and select buttons bring up the status screen and the inventory menu, respectively. In addition, the player can equip various suits of armor and shields. Defeating monsters allows the player to gain experience points which increases his level thus boosting his health, defense, and attack strength.

The primary means of defeating monsters is through the use of four elemental swords scattered throughout the game (the fifth sword, Crystalis, is obtained in the final dungeon). The swords are capable of both normal slashes and powered-up attacks that launch elemental projectiles. Each of the four swords is imbued with a distinct elemental power (wind, fire, water, and thunder), making each sword more effective than the others in various situations. The elemental nature of each sword also provides a necessary means of traversing otherwise impassable obstacles; certain barriers succumb to the power blasts of individual swords, and the Sword of Water creates a bridge of ice across some shallow, narrow sections of rivers. Some enemies are immune to certain types of elements and must be killed using the opposing element (for instance, ice creatures are weak against fire). Also bosses and enemies require the hero be a certain level or else they cannot be harmed, even if the correct sword is used. The player can also jump over enemies, and certain enemies can form puddles to slide under the sword's reach.

== Synopsis ==
=== Plot ===
Crystalis takes place in a post-apocalyptic world, in 2097, one hundred years after "1997, October 1, The END DAY", when a global thermonuclear war began that reverted civilization to a primitive, medieval existence populated with fierce mutated creatures. Science and advanced technology have been abandoned, with the survivors deciding to study the ways of magic. The survivors of the destruction built a floating "Tower" to prevent any future cataclysms, as its occupants would have the power to govern the world, due to the Tower's weapons systems. A man known as Draygon, however, revived the forbidden ways of science and combined them with magic. With these skills, he controls the world's last remaining military power and seeks to conquer what is left of the planet by attempting to enter the Tower.

The protagonist awakens with no memory, but, guided by four wise sages, gradually learns that the world is sinking into turmoil, due to the Draygonia Empire's destructive influence. Entrusted with the Sword of Wind, he seeks to aid Mesia, another survivor from his time, and to combine the four elemental Swords of Wind, Fire, Water, and Thunder into the legendary sword, Crystalis. Together, they must defeat Draygon before he uses the Tower to achieve his evil ambitions.

=== Characters ===
The anonymous male protagonist (named SNK by default in the NES version, Simea in the Game Boy Color version) and his female accomplice, Mesia, are scientists who were cryogenically frozen, to be released when the tower began to activate. The protagonist is assisted by four sages named Zebu, Tornel, Asina, and Kensu, primarily in learning magic spells and gaining information about the world and the quest. They are encountered frequently throughout the game, and the player can seek their advice using the telepathy spell. In the GBC version, the sages are each responsible for creating one of the four swords: Zebu for Wind, Tornel for Fire, Asina for Water, and Kensu for Thunder. The original game does not mention who forged the ancient swords.

There are also four recurring boss characters, "Dragonia's Finest Four". Comprising this group are: General Kelbesque, Sabera the Witch, the Swordsman Mado, and Karmine the Wizard. Each of them has a distinct elemental weakness and, with the exception of Karmine, each is encountered twice during the adventure. Though not the final adversary in the game, Emperor Draygon is the ultimate antagonist and the root of all of evil in Crystalis. After defeating his false self, the hero encounters the real one and reveals his true, dragon-like form. After defeating the real Draygon, the hero gains access to the Tower for a final showdown with a machine called DYNA.

== Development ==
Two of the characters from Crystalis are subtle nods to earlier SNK characters who later became part of The King of Fighters series; the latter two sages, Kensu and Asina, are based on Kensou Sie and Athena Asamiya from the Psycho Soldier arcade game. In The King of Fighters series, Kensou is well known for his obsession with Athena, a quality demonstrated even in Crystalis.

== Release ==
The game was released in Japan on April 13, 1990, and later released in North America in July.

=== Game Boy Color version ===
Nearly ten years after the game's initial release, Nintendo, with licensing from SNK, re-released Crystalis for the Game Boy Color on June 26, 2000. This version, however, is a significantly different game, exemplified by a different opening sequence. The nature of the Tower's origin and its purpose were fundamentally altered, with the Tower now being a weapon created by the game's antagonist, and the protagonist has been elevated to a hero of ancient prophecy destined to save the world. This story sequence was used in the instruction manual for the NES version.

Other major changes include an almost completely new soundtrack, re-translation differences (for example, Draygon is now known as Dragonia, as in the Japanese version) and rewriting of story-items and events (Kensu's Body and the dialogue in the Dwarven village, for example). The game now has a different final sequence too: in the original, after defeating Draygon's two forms in the pyramid, a character named Azteca dies and then the players travel to the flying tower to fight the final boss DYNA, the computer controlling the tower. In the Game Boy Color version, the players go to the flying tower directly (which has been shortened compared to the original). Once inside, the players fight DYNA and then fight Draygon's two forms. The re-ordering of these last battles caused Azteca's death scene to be excised from the game. Also, a digital voice was added to state the name of each sword upon discovery.

Unlike the original version, enemies are not immune to certain elemental swords. The lower resolution of the Game Boy Color screen, compared to that of the NES, results in a field of view smaller than in the original, making the GBC port more difficult; some enemies can now attack the player from off-screen.

=== SNK 40th Anniversary Collection version ===
SNK re-released Crystalis for the Nintendo Switch in November 2018, as part of the SNK 40th Anniversary Collection. This collection, including Crystalis, was released in 2019 for Sony PlayStation 4 on March 19, for Xbox One on May 2, and for Steam on June 7. The PlayStation 4, Xbox One, and Steam releases of the SNK 40th Anniversary Collection mark the first time that Crystalis, a game once exclusive to the NES, had been made officially available outside of a Nintendo console.

== Reception ==
Reception

Review scores
Publication	Score
Electronic Gaming Monthly	7/10, 8/10, 7/10, 8/10 (NES)
Famitsu	6/10, 8/10, 8/10, 6/10 (FC)
GameSpot	8/10 (GBC)
IGN	8/10 (GBC)
Famicom Hisshoubon	2.5/5 (FC)

The original NES version of Crystalis was praised for its advanced graphics, high quality soundtrack, and elaborate plot. For their review of the Nintendo Switch emulated port of Crystalis in the SNK 40th Anniversary Collection, Switch RPG noted that "Crystalis features one of the best soundtracks from the NES era". Critics remarked that the story and art design seemed to draw heavily from the Hayao Miyazaki anime film Nausicaä of the Valley of the Wind. The main criticism of the game was its repetitive gameplay, as many enemies can be overcome by continuous rapid pressing of one button. The reviewer "Pocket Squirrel" also mentioned flawed collision detection in his review for RPGFan. IGN ranked Crystalis #42 on its list of the Top 100 NES Games.

In the Japanese gaming magazine Famitsu, some of the writers compared it as similar to both Ys and The Legend of Zelda. In December 2005, Nintendo Power ranked the NES release of Crystalis at number 115 in a list of the 200 best games ever to appear on a Nintendo system, the "NP Top 200". In a retrospective, Kotaku stated that "Crystalis has flaws, but makes up for it with bold strides in its narrative and gameplay". 1up.com called it a "hidden Gem" for the NES, and said it was one of the better games inspired by Zelda on the system, contrasting it with Willow, which they said was quite poor. Switch RPG called Crystalis "easily one of the best action RPGs from the NES era".

The Game Boy Color port was not received as favorably, the majority of reviews citing it as an inferior copy, due to reduced screen resolution and altered plot, as well as its being seen as dated compared to more recently made games. The music is regarded as one of the port's worst aspects. The port was given an 8.0 rating by IGN, however, which denotes an "impressive" game. IGN criticized the game for being too linear and having a low difficulty level but praised its large world and visually detailed "cinema cutscenes". GameSpot also gave the Game Boy Color port an 8.0, saying of the original NES release: "Crystalis' sheer depth - and the quality of its presentation - was without peer, and it is still regarded as a milestone title in the [action RPG] genre".
