= Alpha Mission =

1985 video game

- North American arcade flyer
- Developer: SNK
- Publisher: SNK: NA: Tradewest (arcade)
- Designer: Koji Obata
- Artist: Rampty
- Platforms: Arcade, NES
- Release: Arcade: JP: November 1985; NA: May 1986; NES; 1986
- Genre: Scrolling shooter
- Modes: Single-player, multiplayer

Alpha Mission, known as ASO: Armored Scrum Object (Note: Japanese: エー・エス・オー - アーマード・スクラム・オブジェクト, Hepburn: Ē Esu Ō - Āmādo Sukuramu Obujekuto) in Japan, is a 1985 vertically scrolling shooter video game developed and published by SNK for arcades. It was released by Tradewest in North America. It was later ported to the Famicom in 1986 and released for the Nintendo Entertainment System in 1987.

The arcade game was a commercial success in Japan, where it was the seventh highest-grossing table arcade game of 1986. A sequel, Alpha Mission II, was released for the Neo Geo arcade system in 1991.

== Gameplay ==
Alpha Mission is a one-player scrolling shooter game in its segregation of air-to-air and air-to-ground weapons. Missiles are used to destroy ground enemies, while laser-like weapons are used for aerial opponents. Throughout each of the levels, the player must fight off waves of enemies that threaten several space stations and a boss must be defeated at the end of each. Like most early games in this genre, when the player dies, all weapons are lost and the player is moved to a point slightly before the point of death. The player's craft can also be upgraded to have more powerful weapons by picking up various power-ups throughout the level.

== Plot ==
The seven stars from the Tetranova galaxy have been in a fierce war between themselves for a very long time, a war which only served to lay waste to their homes. In the end, their homes were completely destroyed and all of their natural resources exausted, so they stopped the fighting and formed the Seven Star Alliance, with the objective of seeking a new home where they can rebuild their strength to continue waging war. Around the year 2300, the Seven Star Alliance's fleet finally reaches the Solar System, as they choose Earth to be their new home. They decide to attack Earth and destroy the human Race so they can conquer the planet. In response, Earth sends the SYD fighters to stop the invasion. The war between Earth's forces and the Seven Star Alliance would go on for 200 years, in 2515 The Player Character Came into Picture and Must End the War

== Release ==
Alpha Mission was released on the PlayStation Portable as part of PSP Minis via PlayStation Store in 2011. Alpha Mission was also released on the Nintendo Switch in the Nintendo eShop on October 25, 2018 and on the PlayStation 4 via PlayStation Store on July 18, 2019 by Hamster Corporation as part of their Arcade Archives series. The game is also included on SNK 40th Anniversary Collection, containing both the original arcade and the NES version. It includes both the Japanese version and the Western/international version.

== Reception ==
In Japan, Game Machine listed ASO as the second most successful table arcade cabinet of November 1985. The magazine later listed it as Japan's fifth highest-grossing table arcade game during the first half of 1986, and the seventh overall highest-grossing table arcade game of 1986.
