= Victory Road (video game) =

1986 video game

- Arcade flyer
- Developers: SNK (Arcade); Paradise Software (Spectrum); Micronics (NES)
- Publishers: WW: SNK; NA: Tradewest
- Composer: Toshikazu Tanaka
- Series: Ikari Warriors
- Platforms: Arcade, Amiga, Atari ST, Commodore 64, Apple II, Nintendo Entertainment System, Amstrad CPC, ZX Spectrum, IBM PC
- Release: October 1986: Arcade; JP: October 1986; NA: February 1987 ZX Spectrum 1989 Atari ST 1988 Amiga 1989 NES; JP: 16 April 1988; NA: April 1988
- Genre: Run and gun
- Modes: Single-player, multiplayer

Victory Road, released as Dogō Sōken (Note: Japanese: 怒号層圏, Hepburn: Dogō Sōken; lit. "Bellowing Atmosphere") in Japan and also known as Ikari Warriors II: Victory Road, is a run and gun video game developed and published by SNK for arcades. It was released in Japan in 1986 and North America in 1987 by Tradewest. The game is a sequel to Ikari Warriors, released earlier on that same year.

== Gameplay ==
The original arcade game featured an 8-way rotary joystick that could be twisted in place to rotate the onscreen character allowing the player to face in one of eight directions while moving in another.

It features sampled voiceovers from the main characters and the game's bosses.

Screenshot of the NES version

Weapon powerups are scattered throughout the levels, often hidden under rocks destroyable by the bazooka weapon or grenades.

There are no vehicles in this game, but it was replaced by armour, which allows the player or players to take a limited number of hits without any time running out.

The game reuses the single-stage design from its predecessor, but added mini-stages where players fight a mini boss when they enter through a green door.

== Plot ==
The objective is to defeat the enemy aliens using grenades and other weapons. The story directly picks up at the end of Ikari Warriors. After being congratulated by General Kawasaki for rescuing him, Paul and Vince return home to their native country in a plane arranged by the general himself. A mysterious storm appears and they are hurtled thousands of years into the future. They are met by an alien creature who says that the villain Zang Zip has taken over the land.

== Reception ==
In Japan, Game Machine listed Victory Road on their December 1, 1986 issue as being the third most-successful table arcade unit of the month.

The Spanish magazine Microhobby reviewed the ZX Spectrum version of the game with the following scores: Originality: 20%; Graphics: 70%; Motion: 70%; Sound: 70%; Difficulty: 90%; Addiction: 80%.

== Legacy ==
Victory Road was followed up with the sequel Ikari III: The Rescue, released in 1989.

Hamster Corporation released the arcade version as part of their Arcade Archives series for the Nintendo Switch and PlayStation 4 in 2019.
