= Sasuke vs. Commander =

1980 video game

- Japanese arcade flyer
- Developer: Tose
- Publisher: SNK
- Platform: Arcade
- Release: JP: October 1980
- Genre: Fixed shooter
- Modes: Single-player, multiplayer

Sasuke vs. Commander (Note: Japanese: サスケＶＳコマンダー) is a fixed shooter developed by Tose and published in 1980 by SNK as an arcade video game. In contrast to the outer-space theme of most fixed shooters of the era, Sasuke vs. Commander is set in a magical world with ninja-like enemies and alternative waves of simple attackers and more powerful bosses. It is the first game to be developed by Tose, who would go on to become a prolific work-for-contract developer that would remain uncredited for most of its career.

Sasuke vs. Commander was popular in Japan; according to Game Machine, it was in 10th place overall in 1981 grosses, tied with the older, but still popular, Space Invaders and Missile Command. It is historically notable as among the earliest examples of recurring boss fights.

== Gameplay ==
The player controls Sasuke, a ninja dressed in blue who moves left and right across the bottom of a vertically oriented screen and throws kunai. The game alternates between two types of levels, and the player begins the game with three extra lives and the ability to only throw one kunai at a time.

The first level type, the ninja stage, takes place on a background portraying two large trees on the left and right edges of the screen with a road between them leading to a Japanese castle in the distance. Groups of ninjas dressed in red appear in puffs of smoke and attack Sasuke by throwing shuriken down the length of the screen at him while leaping back and forth between the trees, moving closer and closer to Sasuke with each successive leap and giving the player less time to react to their unpredictable shuriken attacks. Sasuke is killed and loses one of his lives if the shuriken strike him, but he can either dodge the shuriken or throw kunai at them, with the second option being risky because kunai will sometimes destroy and fly through the shuriken, and other times be destroyed by the shuriken as they fly through Sasuke's kunai. Sasuke must kill enemy ninja by hitting them with kunai, and when killed, they become purple corpses and fall down the screen which can kill Sasuke by falling on top of him; the corpses are indestructible and can only be dodged. Points are amassed with each successfully killed ninja, and the player will receive one extra life upon reaching 5000 points, allowing for a total of four extra lives at maximum. When enough red ninja are killed, a second wave of ninja dressed in green replaces them and begins attacking in a different pattern.

When Sasuke kills enough green ninja, the second type of level begins: a boss stage called the Magic Bonus. These stages start with a boss approaching from the distant castle while a fanfare plays, after which the action moves to a new background scene showing a mountain landscape. During these levels, the bosses move around the screen and use magic attacks which will kill Sasuke if they connect. These levels are timed, and the player receives a point bonus if he kills the boss based on how much time is left. If he is killed on these levels or fails to kill the boss before time runs out, he receives no bonus but does not lose a life. Once reaching the third ninja stage, Sasuke gains the ability to throw two kunai at a time during ninja stages but is always limited to one kunai at a time in boss stages. There are eight unique bosses who each utilize different attacks, the names of which the bosses call out in Japanese script before engaging Sasuke in battle. After eight of each level type are completed, the game loops, with the first boss recurring after the ninth stage, the second boss recurring after the tenth stage, and so on.

The game only ends if Sasuke loses all of his lives, at which point a cutscene shows Sasuke running, tripping over a rock, and not getting up.

== Reception ==
Although few English language materials refer to the game, the Japanese arcade trade newspaper Game Machine lists it as being the 10th most popular arcade game in 1981 based on income, tied with Space Invaders and Missile Command.

It has since become better known as one of SNK's earliest releases, as well as one of the first arcade games to include multiple boss fights, along with Phoenix and Cidelsa's Destroyer of the same year.

Hamster Corporation released the game as part of their Arcade Archives series for the Nintendo Switch and PlayStation 4 in 2020.
