= P.O.W.: Prisoners of War =

1988 video game

- North American arcade flyer
- Developer: SNK
- Publisher: SNK: EU: Electrocoin
- Platforms: Arcade, Famicom/NES
- Release: Arcade: JP: August 1988; NA: September 1988; Famicom/NES: JP: June 30, 1989; NA: September 1989
- Genre: Beat 'em up
- Modes: Single-player, multiplayer

P.O.W.: Prisoners of War, released in Japan as Prisoners of War, (Note: Japanese: 脱獄, Hepburn: Datsugoku) is a 1988 beat 'em up video game developed and published by SNK for arcades. A port to the Nintendo Entertainment System on June 30, 1989, in Japan and in September in North America. The game takes place during the Cold War where the player or players control a duo of military prisoners, Snake and Bart, who break free from their cell to relentlessly fight their way into the main base of their adversaries in order to eliminate their enemy's general and escape with their lives.

== Gameplay ==
The game's objective is to escape from the enemy's base by fighting, as a lone wolf or with a partner, through four stages filled with numerous types of enemy soldiers trying to impede the player's escape. The stages consist of a POW camp, a warehouse, a jungle, and the enemy's base. Occasionally the enemy will attack the player with vehicles such as an assault chopper, an armored truck or motorcycles. At the end of the final stage, the player confronts an enemy general before being picked up by the extraction chopper proceeding to the final escape sequence.

The game can be played by up to two players simultaneously, with the first player controlling a character in blue and the second in red. The controls consist of an eight-way joystick for moving the character and three action buttons for punching, kicking, and jumping. There are also three special attacks performed by pressing two buttons simultaneously: a jump kick (jump, and then kick), a back punch (jump and punch simultaneously), and a headbutt (punch and kick simultaneously). The player can also pick up one of two weapons dropped by defeated enemies: a throwing knife and a machine gun. The controls changes while wielding a weapon. The knife is thrown by pressing the punch button but can be preserved by the player until needed by using kicks. When wielding the machine gun, the player can fire it by pressing the kick button or conserve its ammo by pressing the punch button to gun whip enemies.

== NES version ==
Unlike the arcade version, the NES version is single player only. The premise of the game remains the same, but the controls are changed due to the lack of a third action button. The jump kick is performed by pressing punch and kick simultaneously (B and A), while the back-punch is performed by holding the d-pad on the player's opposite direction and pressing B at the same time (the headbutt is the only combination attack removed in the NES version). However, the player has the ability to pick up and use hand grenades (which were only used by enemy characters in the arcade version) during the boss encounters against the helicopter in Stage 1 and the tank in Stage 4. There are also new enemy characters (such as frogmen, shotgun wielders, and a fat strongman), as well as a new final boss.

There are also huts and rooms where the player can obtain power-ups by defeating the enemies inside. The power-ups consists of a full life recovery, a brass knuckle that increases the player's punch strength, and an armor that makes the player invulnerable to gunshots and knife throws.

== Reception ==
Nick Kelly of Commodore User wrote that the arcade game was faithful to Double Dragon and Renegade before it and called it a "good solid beat 'em up", rating it a 6 out of 10. In Japan, Game Machine listed P.O.W.: Prisoners of War on their December 15, 1988 issue as being the third most-successful table arcade unit of the month.

== Re-release ==
The game was included in the SNK 40th Anniversary Collection in 2018. Hamster Corporation released the game as part of their Arcade Archives series for the Nintendo Switch and PlayStation 4 in 2020.
