= SNK =

Japanese video game company

SNK Corporation

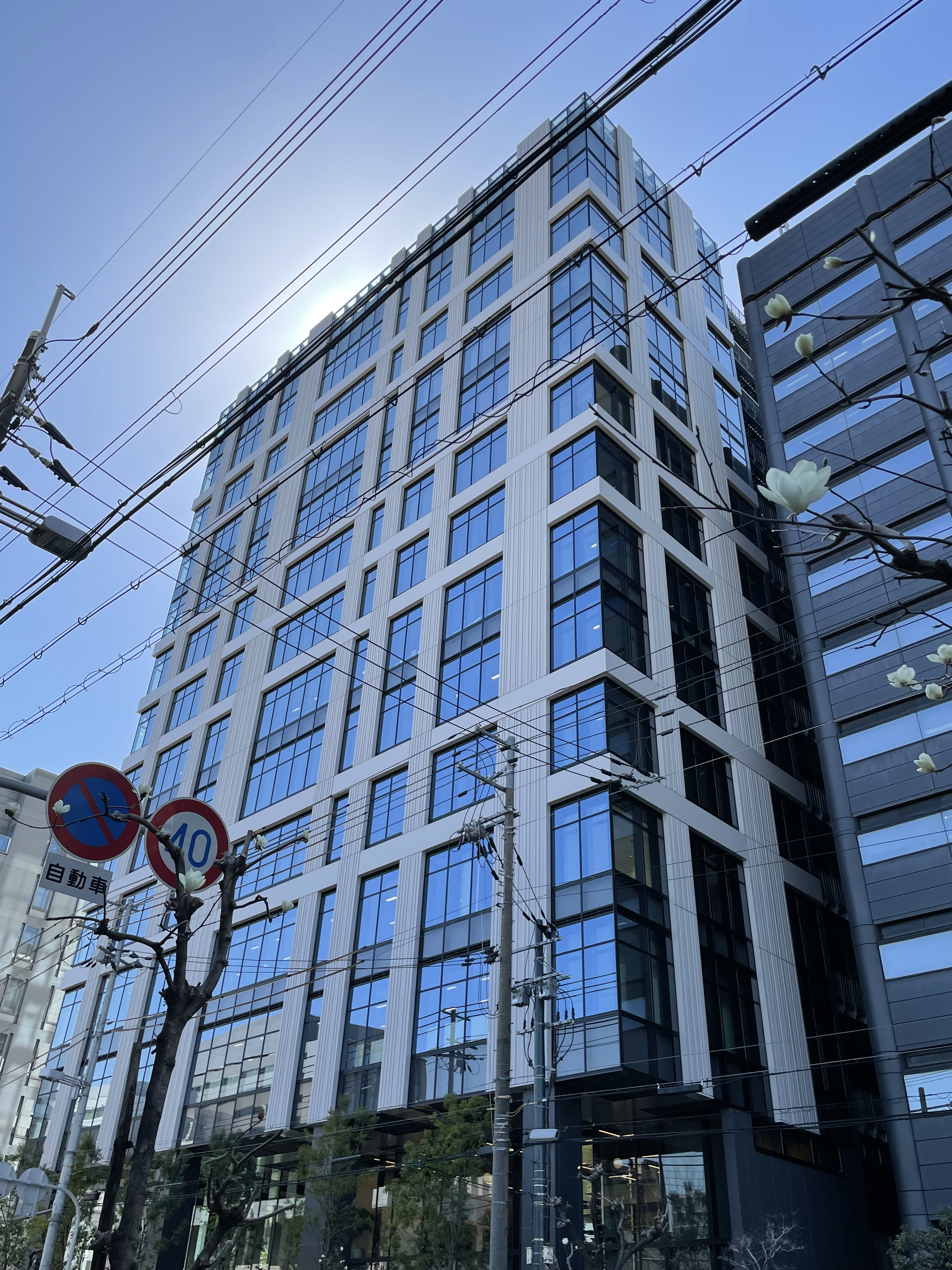
- Headquarters in Yodogawa-ku, Osaka, since 2023
- Native name: 株式会社SNK
- Romanized name: Kabushiki gaisha SNK
- Formerly: Original company; Shin Nihon Kikaku (1978–1986); SNK Corporation (1986–2001); Current company; Playmore Corporation (2001–2003); SNK Playmore Corporation (2003–2016)
- Type: Subsidiary
- Industry: Video games; Electronics
- Founded: July 22, 1978; 48 years ago (as Shin Nihon Kikaku Corporation); August 1, 2001; 25 years ago (as Playmore Corporation)
- Founder: Eikichi Kawasaki
- Defunct: October 30, 2001; 25 years ago (original)
- Headquarters: Suita, Osaka, Japan (1978–2023); Yodogawa-ku, Osaka, Japan (2023–present)
- Area served: Worldwide
- Key people: Ge Zhihui (Interim CEO & Chairman); Kenji Matsubara (Advisor); Katsuhiro Harada (CEO of SNK VS Studio)
- Revenue: ▲¥3,105,000,000 (2017)
- Net income: ▲¥115,000,000 (2015)
- Number of employees: ▲472 (as of April 1, 2025)
- Parent: Electronic Gaming Development Company
- Divisions: Studio Alpha; Playmore Entertainment; SNK Animation Studio; SNK VS Studio
- Subsidiaries: Shogun Studios; Neo Geo Comics; SNK Electronics
- Website: www.snk-corp.co.jp

SNK Corporation (Japanese: 株式会社SNK, Hepburn: Kabushiki gaisha SNK) is a Japanese video game developer and publisher. It was founded in 1978 as Shin Nihon Kikaku (新日本企画; lit. 'New Japan Project') by Eikichi Kawasaki and began by developing arcade games. SNK is known for its Neo Geo arcade system on which the company established many franchises during the 1990s, including Art of Fighting, Fatal Fury, Metal Slug, Samurai Shodown, and The King of Fighters; it continues to develop and publish new titles on contemporary arcade and home platforms. Since the 2000s, SNK has diversified from its traditional arcade focus into pachislot machines, mobile game development, and character licensing.

In 2001, due to financial troubles, the original SNK Corporation was forced to close. Anticipating the end of the company, founder Kawasaki established Playmore Corporation, which acquired all of the intellectual property of the SNK Corporation. In 2003, Playmore Corporation was renamed to SNK Playmore Corporation. In 2016, SNK dropped "Playmore" from its name. It has been owned by Electronic Gaming Development Company, a subsidiary of the Saudi Arabian Misk Foundation, since 2022.

== History ==
=== Beginnings (1973–1981) ===
The "SNK: Shin Nihon Kikaku Corp." logo from 1982 to 1986 combined with the original 1978 "S" logo

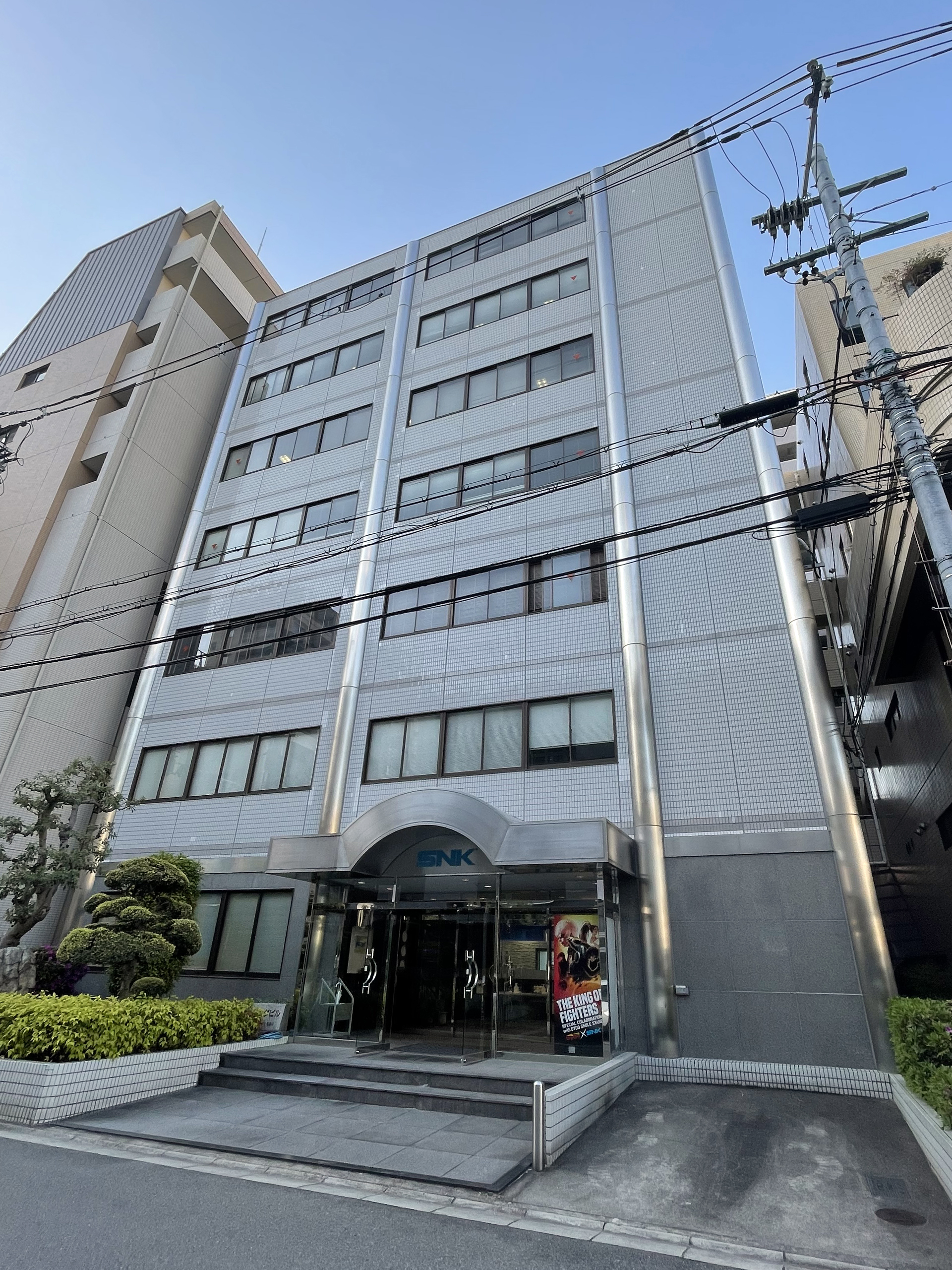
A previous location for SNK headquarters in Esaka, Osaka

SNK was founded in 1973 as Shin Nihon Kikaku and reorganized on July 22, 1978, as a stock company (kabushiki gaisha) under the name "Shin Nihon Kikaku Corporation". When Eikichi Kawasaki noticed rapid growth in the coin-operated video game market, he expanded Shin Nihon Kikaku to include the development and marketing of stand-alone coin-op games.

The company was nicknamed "Shin Nihon Kikaku" in katakana at first; however, since 1981, it has been changed to "SNK" by taking the initials from the Roman alphabet (Shin Nihon Kikaku). The English copyright notation was also "SNK CORPORATION". It established itself in Sunnyvale, California, to deliver its own brand of coin-operated games to arcades in North America. SNK chose John Rowe to head its American operation.

The first two titles that SNK released were Ozma Wars (1979), a vertical space shooter, and Safari Rally (1980), a maze game. Game quality improved over time, with SNK outsourcing development of the games Sasuke vs. Commander (1980) and Vanguard (1981) to then-inexperienced Tose. SNK licensed various games to Centuri for distribution in North America, motivating it to start manufacturing and distributing games by itself when profits exceeded projections. In part due to the success of Vanguard, SNK began to gain fame and reputation. An American branch named SNK Electronics Corporation opened on October 20, 1981.

=== First Incarnation of SNK Corporation (1986–1999) ===
In April 1986, the company name was changed to SNK Corporation, adopting the initialism SNK as its trade name. This is because the Ministry of Justice at the time did not allow the registration of business names in alphabets. (Note: Game companies that followed the same path include ADK (formerly Alpha Denshi Corporation) and NMK (formerly Nihon Maicon Kaihatsu), while companies in different industries include TDK (formerly Tokyo Denki Kagaku) and these include RKB Mainichi Broadcasting (former company name: RKB Mainichi Broadcasting), and KDDI (formerly known as International Telegraph and Telephone, currently known as KDDI).) In November 1986, the American subsidiary SNK Corporation of America was born in Sunnyvale, California. In March 1988, SNK staff moved to a building in Suita, Osaka, Japan.

At this point, the Japanese operations of SNK Corporation had shifted its focus solely toward developing and licensing video games for arcade use and later for early consoles. Between 1979 and 1986, SNK produced 23 stand-alone arcade games. Highlights from this period include Mad Crasher (1984), Alpha Mission (1985), and Athena (1986), a game that gained a large following when it was ported to the Nintendo Entertainment System (NES) in 1987. SNK's most successful game from this time was Ikari Warriors, released in 1986. It was licensed and ported to the Atari 2600, Atari 7800, Commodore 64, Amiga, Amstrad CPC, Apple II, ZX Spectrum, and NES. After Ikari Warriors, SNK released two sequels: Victory Road (1986) and Ikari III: The Rescue (1989).

At the time, Japan was affected by the video game crash of 1983. The console manufacturer Nintendo remained in business throughout and after the crash. SNK became a third-party licensee for Nintendo's Famicom (known as the NES outside of Japan) system in 1985. It opened a second branch in the US, called SNK Home Entertainment, based in Torrance, California. The branch handled the North American distribution and marketing of the company's products for home consoles. John Rowe had already left the company to form Tradewest, which went on to market the Ikari Warriors series in North America. Paul Jacobs took over Rowe's position over both halves of SNK America. He is known for having helped launch the company's Neo Geo system outside of Asia.

In response to strong sales of the company's NES ports, SNK began to dabble in the development of original software designed specifically for the NES console. Two games came out of this effort: Baseball Stars (1989) and Crystalis (1990; known as God Slayer in Japan). In 1989, two home video game consoles were released in North America: the Sega Genesis, and NEC and Hudson Soft's TurboGrafx-16. Nintendo followed suit with a new system in 1991, the Super Nintendo Entertainment System (Super NES, SNES). SNK as a whole did not become involved in the "system wars" of the early 1990s. Instead, it refocused its efforts on arcades. Other third parties, such as Romstar and Takara, were left to license and port SNK's properties to the various home consoles of the time with help from SNK's American home entertainment division. With console ports mainly handled outside the company, it moved on to developing SNK-branded arcade equipment. SNK also licensed Tiger Electronics to market handheld electronic games from some of its brands.

Logo of Neo Geo, which SNK released in 1990

In 1988, SNK created the idea of a modular cabinet for arcades. Up to that point, arcade cabinets typically contained only one game. When an arcade operator wanted to switch or replace that game, it would have to completely remove the internals of the existing cabinet or exchange the entire setup for another game. SNK's new system, called the Neo Geo MVS (short for Multi Video System), developed by Fatal Fury and The King of Fighters director Takashi Nishiyama, featured multiple games in a single cabinet and used a cartridge-based storage mechanism. The system debuted in 1990 and could contain one, two, four, or six separate games in a single cabinet. To swap in a new game, all the operator had to do was remove one cartridge and exchange it for another. The MVS was an immediate success. It greatly shortened the setup time needed for each game, minimized floor space for cabinets, and reduced costs for new cartridges to US$500—less than half of what a traditional arcade unit cost at the time.

SNK wanted to bring arcade games to people's homes without making CPU and memory performance compromises that typical home consoles were forced to make. In 1990, the Neo Geo family was created. The company released a home version of the MVS, a single cartridge unit called the Neo Geo Advanced Entertainment System (Neo Geo AES). Initially, the AES was only available for rent or for use in hotel settings, but SNK quickly began selling the system through stores when customer response indicated that people were willing to spend money on home versions. Several franchises of games derived from it, including Sengoku, The King of Fighters, The Last Blade, Super Sidekicks, Art of Fighting, Metal Slug, Burning Fight, Savage Reign, Samurai Shodown, and Fatal Fury. The King of Fighters, Samurai Shodown, and Metal Slug series were continued on later consoles. SNK also helped publish third-party Neo Geo games such as ADK's World Heroes and Aggressors of Dark Kombat, Visco's Breakers and Ganryu, Noise Factory's Rage of the Dragons and Sengoku 3, Sunsoft's Galaxy Fight: Universal Warriors and Waku Waku 7, Sammy's Viewpoint, NMK's Zed Blade, Psikyo's Strikers 1945 Plus, Aiky/Taito's Pochi and Nyaa, Paon/Eleven/Gavaking's Nightmare in the Dark, Face's Money Puzzle Exchanger, Data East's Spinmaster and Street Slam, and Technōs Japan's Double Dragon and Voltage Fighter Gowcaizer. During this time, SNK also released stand-alone arcade games, some of which were ported to home consoles, including Vanguard, Alpha Mission, Athena, Ikari Warriors, Psycho Soldier, Touchdown Fever, Time Soldiers, P.O.W.: Prisoners of War, Beast Busters, and Street Smart.

Compared to other consoles at the time, the Neo Geo AES had much better graphics and sound; It debuted at $599 (equivalent to $1,416 in 2025), sold with two joystick controllers and a game (either Baseball Stars Professional or NAM-1975). Within a few months of the system's introduction in North America, SNK increased the cost to $649 and changed the pack-in game to Magician Lord. Alternatively, the console could be bought for $399 with one control stick and without an accompanying game. Other games cost at least $200 each. Joystick controllers contained the same four-button layout as the arcade MVS cabinet. The quality of AES games varied. Some, such as the Super Sidekicks series, were all-new creations, while others were updated versions of earlier successes, such as Baseball Stars Professional. SNK games were graphically bold and bright. Games such as Top Hunter: Roddy & Cathy and the famous Metal Slug series were distinctive and instantly recognizable, contributing to the system's success in arcades.

SNK also produced the Neo Geo CD home console, the Hyper Neo Geo 64 arcade system, and two handheld game consoles, the Neo Geo Pocket and Pocket Color. Several more famous franchise titles, originally created for the MVS and AES systems, have been ported to other consoles such as the Genesis, Saturn and Dreamcast; SNES; PlayStation and PlayStation 2; Xbox; and Wii.

The Neo Geo Pocket was SNK's original handheld system. It was released in Japan in late 1998 and featured a monochrome (one-color) display. Because its sales were fewer than the expected number, it was discontinued in 1999 in favor of the Neo Geo Pocket Color, which was later released in North America and Europe.

In 1999, SNK opened the Neo Geo World Tokyo Bayside amusement park as part of the Palette Town entertainment complex in Odaiba, Tokyo equipped with attractions such as Ferris wheels and roller coasters. A large-scale tie-in was established with the Fujisankei Communications Group, owners of the nearby television station Fuji TV, and was frequently promoted in various media.

However, by the late 1990s, the 2D fighting game boom, which had been behind much of SNK's recent success, had come to an end, and both the Neo Geo CD and Hyper Neo Geo 64 failed to meet sales expectations. At the same time, the Neo Geo Pocket, while initially selling well, began to fall behind in the market after the release of the Game Boy Color, and Neo Geo World Tokyo Bayside quickly lost attendance after the re-opening of Yokohama Cosmo World a few months later, with the park considered to be a massive failure. In addition, the arcade game magazine Gamest, one of the biggest promoters of SNK titles, ceased publication after its publisher Shinseisha declared bankruptcy in 1999.

=== Bankruptcy (2000–2001) ===
SNK had focused on the booming arcade industry for the 1990s, but as interest in arcades fell in favor of home and portable consoles going into the 2000s, as well as the move to 3D, they were unable to adjust to the changing market. Their newer 3D hardware Hyper Neo Geo 64 was a large failure and the amusement parks opened in Japan also proved to be failing.

SNK tried to develop more titles for the third-party home console market, such as Shinsetsu Samurai Spirits Bushidō Retsuden, Athena: Awakening from the Ordinary Life, Koudelka, and Cool Cool Toon, but as none of them sold well it left the company's financial situation in a dire state. In January 2000, SNK's poor financial status led to its acquisition by Aruze, a company known for its pachinko machines and the parent company of its competitor SETA. Instead of developing video games using SNK's intellectual properties, Aruze manufactured pachinko machines that featured popular series such as King of Fighters. SNK saw little success in the video game market.

The same year, Capcom agreed to create a series of fighting games featuring both companies' fighting game characters. The Capcom vs. SNK games were a success, however most of the profits went to Capcom because it developed and published the games. SNK released SNK vs. Capcom: The Match of the Millennium and SNK vs. Capcom: Card Fighters' Clash on the Neo Geo Pocket Color. Combined, the two games sold around 50,000 copies.

SNK closed all American, Canadian and European operations, on June 13, 2000. The company sold rights to distribution in North America for MVS arcade systems and Neo Print photo systems. It licensed North American localizations of some console releases to outside companies. With low morale and an unclear future, many of the company's employees left their jobs. Some joined rivals Capcom and Arc System Works, and others moved on to found the developer Dimps. Kawasaki, along with five other former SNK executives, funded the formation of BrezzaSoft, which continued to develop Neo Geo games such as The King of Fighters 2001.

With a total debt of about 38 billion yen, SNK gave up on voluntary reconstruction, and on April 2, 2001, SNK applied for the application of the Civil Rehabilitation Law to the Osaka District Court. The application was accepted, and the revitalization procedures were once proceeded, and the head office returned to Suita City, Osaka Prefecture. The district court decided to abolish the civil rehabilitation proceedings on October 1, of the same year, and declared bankruptcy on October 30. Licenses for SNK's game production and development rights to its franchises were sold to several other companies. These included BrezzaSoft, which produced The King of Fighters 2001, such as South Korean-based Eolith, which produced The King of Fighters franchise between 2001 and 2002, and Mega Enterprise, which produced Metal Slug 4.

=== Playmore and SNK Playmore (2001–2016) ===
Established as Playmore Corporation on August 1, 2001. It was originally an affiliate of the former SNK. Initially, it was a legal company specializing in copyright management services, and it would be incorrect to refer to the former SNK as its predecessor company. On October 30, of the same year, the company won the company's intellectual property rights in a bid made during the bankruptcy of the former SNK.

To re-establish its presence in the gaming market, Playmore acquired BrezzaSoft and its former SNK developers, as well as Japan-based Neo Geo developer Noise Factory. Sun Amusement, a Japanese commercial games distributor, was acquired by SNK to provide the company with an arcade distribution outlet in Japan. International offices were established in South Korea, Hong Kong, and the United States under the name SNK NeoGeo for commercial and, later, consumer gaming distribution. In July 2003, with the permission of Eikichi Kawasaki, the founder of the former SNK company, and after it reacquired the rights to SNK trademark from Aruze, the company changed its name to SNK Playmore Corporation. In the same year, SNK purchased ADK shortly after it filed for bankruptcy. Previously, ADK was a third-party company that had been heavily associated with SNK since the late 1980s. SNK Playmore's operations in Japan already largely resembled the original company: SNK employed many employees who left after its bankruptcy filing and occupied its former building.

In October 2002, Kawasaki sued Aruze for copyright infringement, claiming 6.2 billion Japanese yen (US$49,446,510) in damages. He cited that Aruze had continued to use SNK's intellectual properties after Playmore re-acquired them. A preliminary decision in January 2004 by the Osaka District Court favored SNK Playmore, awarding it 5.64 billion yen (US$44,980,374).

SNK Playmore logo from 2003 to 2016 (Green Playmore color used from 2003 to 2014)

In the fall and winter of 2003, SNK Playmore obtained an injunction against a group of four different companies, causing hundreds of AES cartridges to be seized. In the following year, SNK Playmore struck a compromise with two of the companies. The two were allowed to sell AES cartridges, under the conditions that the cartridges would not be modified again and that any legitimate materials would be returned to SNK Playmore.

Within the same year, SNK Playmore would discontinue the AES system, preferring to publish video games in cooperation with Sammy. Using its arcade board Atomiswave, SNK Playmore gained a more secure and modern platform for new arcade releases. In 2004, SNK Playmore officially became licensed to manufacture pachislot machines (Japanese slot machines played in pachinko parlors). The company released its first two machines that year: Metal Slug and Dragon Gal. Pachislots would be more heavily featured in SNK Playmore's product lineup for the next decade.

On December 17, 2004, SNK NEOGEO USA Consumer Corporation announced it would rename to SNK Playmore USA Corporation to facilitate worldwide recognition. In September 2006 at the Tokyo Game Show (TGS), SNK Playmore announced that it had ceased producing games on the Atomiswave, favoring Taito's Type X2 arcade platform. To counter the decline in the commercial gaming industry, the company shifted some of its development focus to consumer games, including original games for the PlayStation 2, Nintendo DS, mobile phones, and other platforms. Games continued to be ported to the PlayStation 2, mostly in Europe because Sony Computer Entertainment America (SCEA) did not approve most SNK Playmore games, and more rarely to the Xbox. In Japan, SNK Playmore released the NeoGeo Online Collection for the PlayStation 2, which contained some of its older games. It featured emulations, and online play was available through the KDDI matching service. The company also released original titles based on existing franchises such as Metal Slug and the KOF: Maximum Impact series.

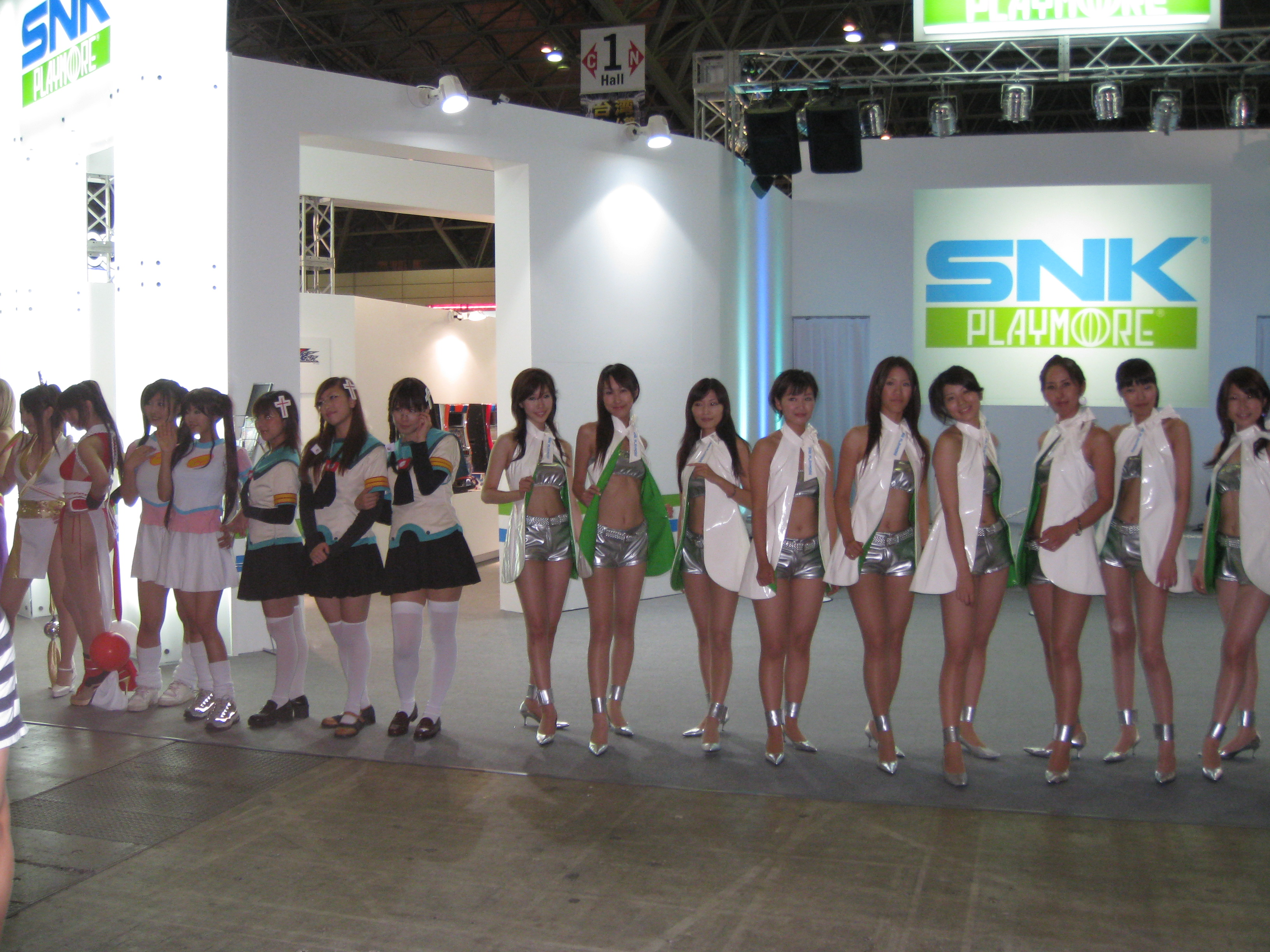
SNK Playmore exposition at the TGS in 2007, including two promotional models dressed as the company mascot, Mai Shiranui (far left) and other

In 2007, SNK Playmore USA released its first game on the Xbox Live Arcade, titled Fatal Fury Special. SNK Playmore also began supporting Nintendo's Virtual Console service on the Wii in the US with Fatal Fury, Art of Fighting, and World Heroes. In 2007, The King of Fighters XI and Neo Geo Battle Coliseum were released. SNK Playmore also released its first adult-themed game franchise, Doki Doki Majo Shinpan!, the first for any handheld console. In 2009, the company released The King of Fighters XII, which was not well received by the public and critics alike due to polemic changes in the game's graphics and structure. In 2010, SNK Playmore released a sequel, The King of Fighters XIII, which was considered a much better game than its immediate predecessor. It either won or was nominated to multiple Game of the Year awards.

SNK has developed a great number of mobile games since 2009. It has licensed its characters for Chinese and other Asian games, mostly mobile.

In December 2012, SNK Playmore released the Neo Geo X, a relaunched mobile Neo Geo console. On October 2, 2013, SNK Playmore terminated its licensing agreement with the console's manufacturer, Tommo, effectively ending production of the Neo Geo X less than a year after its release. Tommo disputed the termination, stating that its contract was extended until 2016 and that it performed every obligation of the licensing agreement.

In June 2013, the VIGAMUS, a museum of video games in Rome, hosted an event dedicated to the history of SNK, tracing back the origins of the company and explaining the evolution of its games. Yamamoto Kei, Kiyoji Tomita, and Ogura Eisuke participated at the event and were interviewed. Ogura also drew two original illustrations to exhibit at the museum.

=== Leyou acquisition and second incarnation of SNK Corporation (2016–2019) ===
In March 2015, Leyou Technologies Holdings submitted a disclosure of interest document to the Hong Kong Stock Exchange, highlighting a "possible investment in a renowned Japanese video game developer". Later in August, it was announced that Chinese web and mobile game giant 37Games, and asset management firm Orient Securities had formed a joint venture to invest in Ledo Millennium, a subsidiary of Leyou. Through Ledo, the venture acquired Kawasaki's 81.25% stake in SNK Playmore for $63.5 million. The reason given for the acquisition was to gain rights to SNK Playmore's intellectual property, and further develop them by following Marvel Entertainment's approach to mass media. The joint venture planned to integrate games, comics, film, and television in a media franchise.

With the purchase completed, SNK Playmore signaled a shift in the company's strategy, which had previously been focused more on the production of pachislot and mobile games than its traditional area, console and arcade games. In November 2015, SNK Playmore announced that it was withdrawing from the pachislot market, choosing instead to focus on console and mobile gaming, as well as character licensing using its popular characters such as Mai Shiranui, Ukyou Tachibana, Nakoruru, and Haohmaru. Additionally, all of the aforementioned characters made their appearance as guest characters in a mobile multiplayer online battle arena (MOBA), Wangzhe Rongyao, roughly translated to English as Honor of Kings, which is the world highest-grossing game of all time as well as the most downloaded mobile app globally.

On April 25, 2016, SNK officially dropped the "Playmore" name from its corporate logo and reintroduced its old slogan, "The Future Is Now", to signify "a return to SNK's rich gaming history". A legal name change from SNK Playmore Corporation to SNK Corporation followed on December 1, 2016, to more firmly establish SNK Playmore as the successor to the old SNK brand and legacy. The King of Fighters XIV, the first entry in its series in more than half a decade, was released in 2016. In July 2018, SNK released the NEOGEO Mini, a miniature console based on the design of the company's Japanese arcade machines. It was pre-loaded with forty classic Neo Geo games.

In June 2019, the 12th entry in the Samurai Shodown series was released for the PlayStation 4 and Xbox One, followed by an arcade version in October and a Nintendo Switch version later in the year.

On September 4, 2019, Nintendo announced that Fatal Fury protagonist and The King of Fighters character Terry Bogard would be added as a downloadable, playable character to Super Smash Bros. Ultimate, with a planned release in November 2019. Terry was made available on November 6, alongside a The King of Fighters-based stage and 50 songs from various SNK series.

=== Misk Foundation acquisition (2020–present) ===
In November 2020, the Misk Foundation, a non-profit organization owned by the crown prince of Saudi Arabia, Mohammed bin Salman, acquired a 33.3% share of SNK from the Chinese company Ledo Millenium through its subsidiary, Electronic Gaming Development Company (EGDC), with the intention to acquire a further 17.7% share at a later time as to gain controlling interest in the company.

On August 1, 2021, SNK appointed Kenji Matsubara, the former chief executive officer of Zynga Japan and president of Sega, as its CEO. On April 6, 2021, MiSK Foundation CEO Badr bin Hamoud AlBadr, Executive Vice President of Activision Blizzard Philip Earl, and former Electronic Arts studio director and executive producer Jeff Peters were appointed as directors of the company. EGDC announced its intention to acquire 51% through additional purchases. In February 2022, EGDC's ownership share was increased to 96.18%. In May, of the same year, SNK notifies the delisting of its shares on the Korea Exchange (KOSDAQ) and EGDC's future plans to acquire all of the company's shares becoming its wholly owned subsidiary. On March 20, 2023, SNK relocated its main headquarters to Yodogawa-ku, Osaka.

On June 28, 2024, SNK opened a Singaporean branch called SNK Games Singapore, and is currently re-expanding its global reach.

On December 30, 2024, SNK announced the establishment of a new division known as KOF Studio to develop future projects in its fighting game franchises.

On May 12, 2025, SNK announced that CEO Kenji Matsubara would step down and assume an advisory role, with the chairman of the Board appointed as interim CEO.

On January 2026, former Wargaming and Ubisoft publishing executive Ozan Kocoglu was appointed as Chief Publishing Officer in Tokyo.

On May 12, 2026, former Bandai Namco Entertainment employee and Tekken game creator, Katsuhiro Harada, established the subsidiary of SNK, VS Studio.

== Products ==
=== Franchises and video games ===
SNK is best recognized for its 2D fighting arcade games, most of which were released during the 1990s on its own Neo Geo arcade system. The first of these was 1991's Fatal Fury: King of Fighters — the first title of the Fatal Fury series — after which numerous other fighting games were released including World Heroes, Art of Fighting, Aggressors of Dark Kombat, and the popular Samurai Shodown. This led to what is often seen as the company's most famous franchise, The King of Fighters — the first title in this series was 1994's The King of Fighters '94. These franchises also consist of numerous notable characters that have since become icons of SNK, such as Terry Bogard, Kyo Kusanagi and Mai Shiranui. In other genres, the Metal Slug run and gun series is also one of SNK's most well known franchises. SNK's earlier catalog also includes the run and gun games "Ikai Warriors" and "Guerilla War," the platform games "Athena" and "Psycho Solder", and thee shoot 'em ups "Alpha Mission", "Prehistoric Isle" and "Vanguard". These were subsequently included in the "SNK 40th Anniversary Collection", which brought together games from the company's pre neo Geo period.

=== Neo Geo and other hardware ===
SNK consoles release timeline
1990	Neo Geo
1991–1993
1994	Neo Geo CD
1995–1997
1998	Neo Geo Pocket
1999	Neo Geo Pocket Color
1999	New Neo Geo Pocket Color
2000–2011
2012	Neo Geo X
2013–2017
2018	Neo Geo Mini
2019	Neo Geo Arcade Stick Pro
2020–2026
2027	Neo Geo AES+

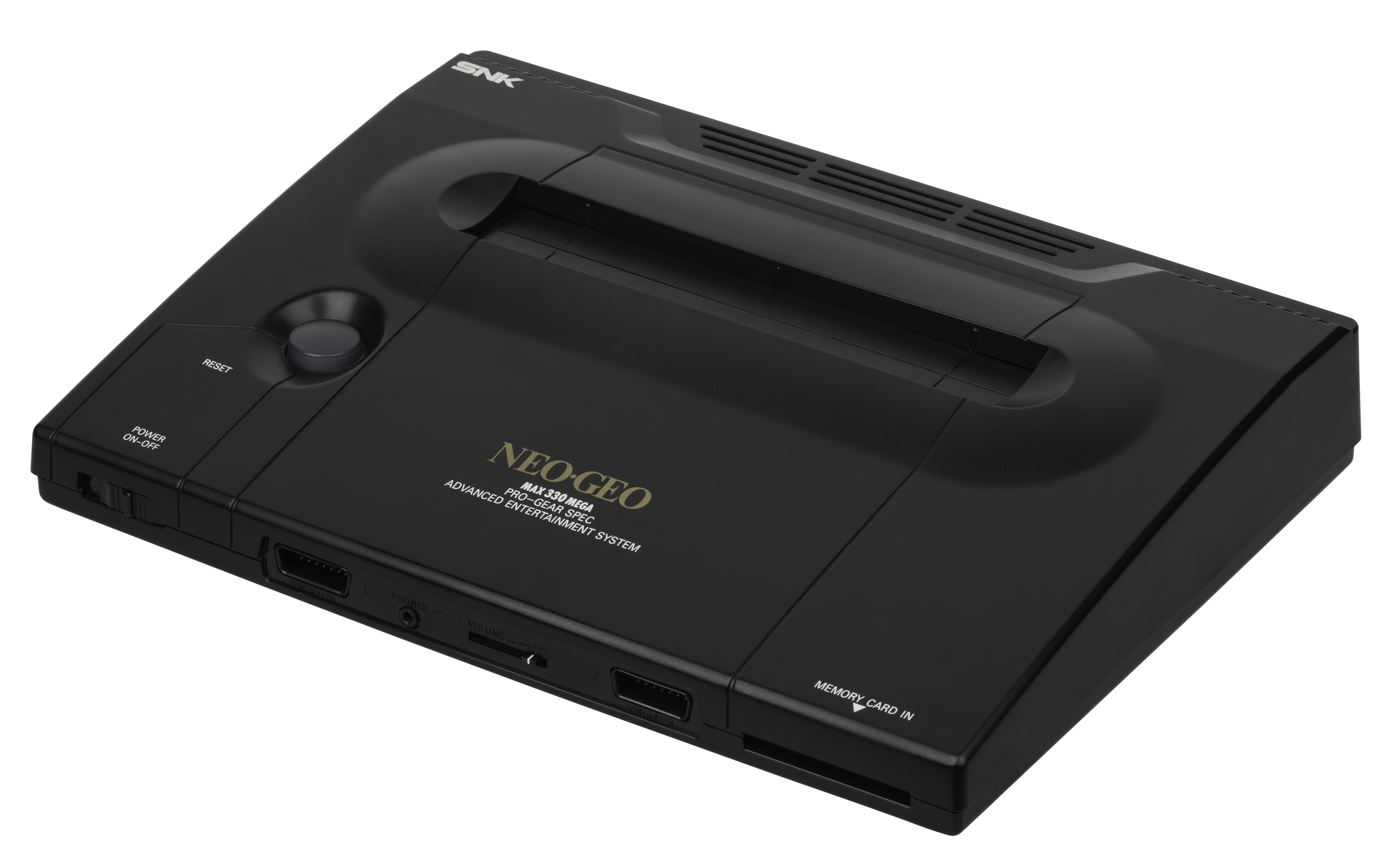
Neo Geo

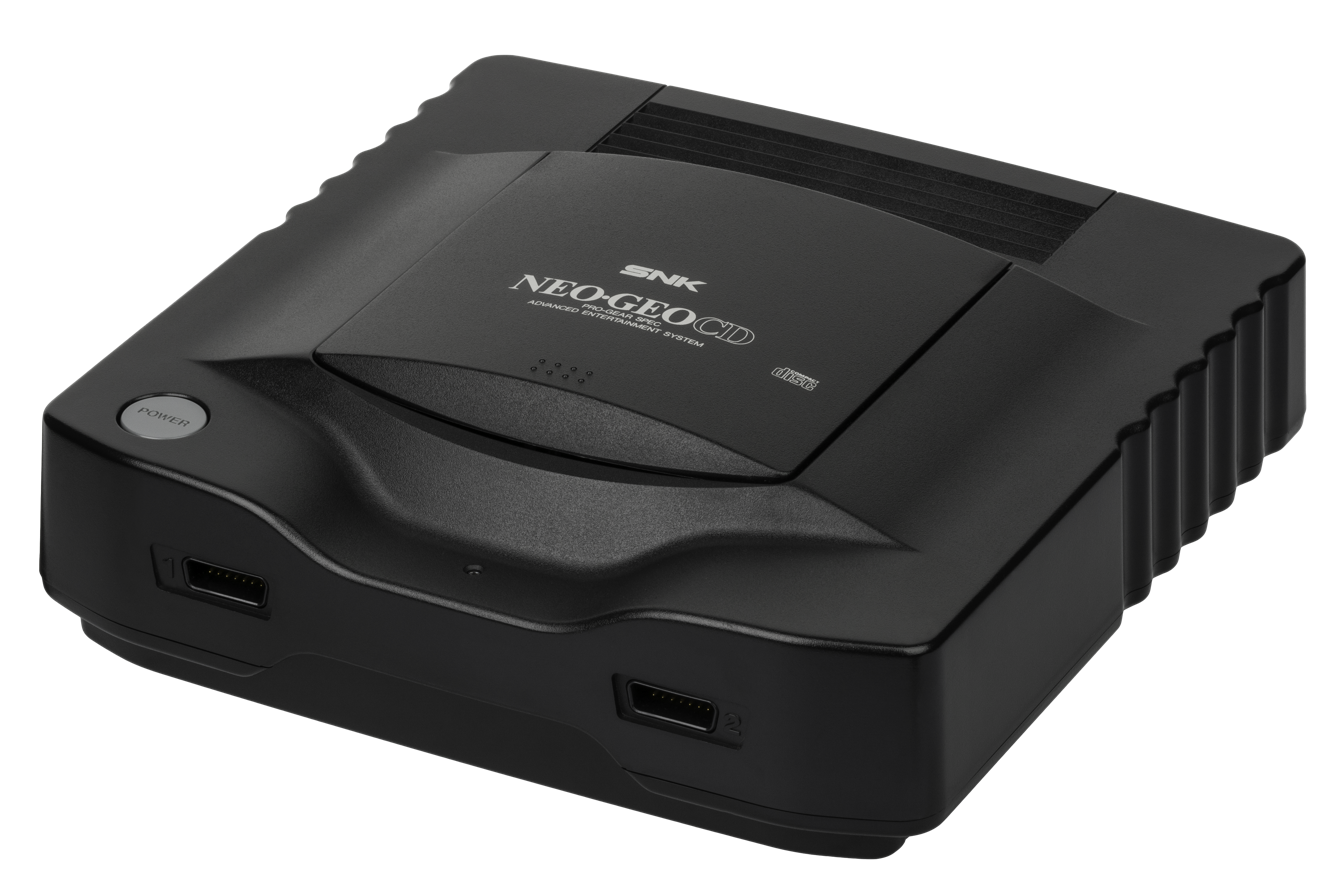
Neo Geo CD

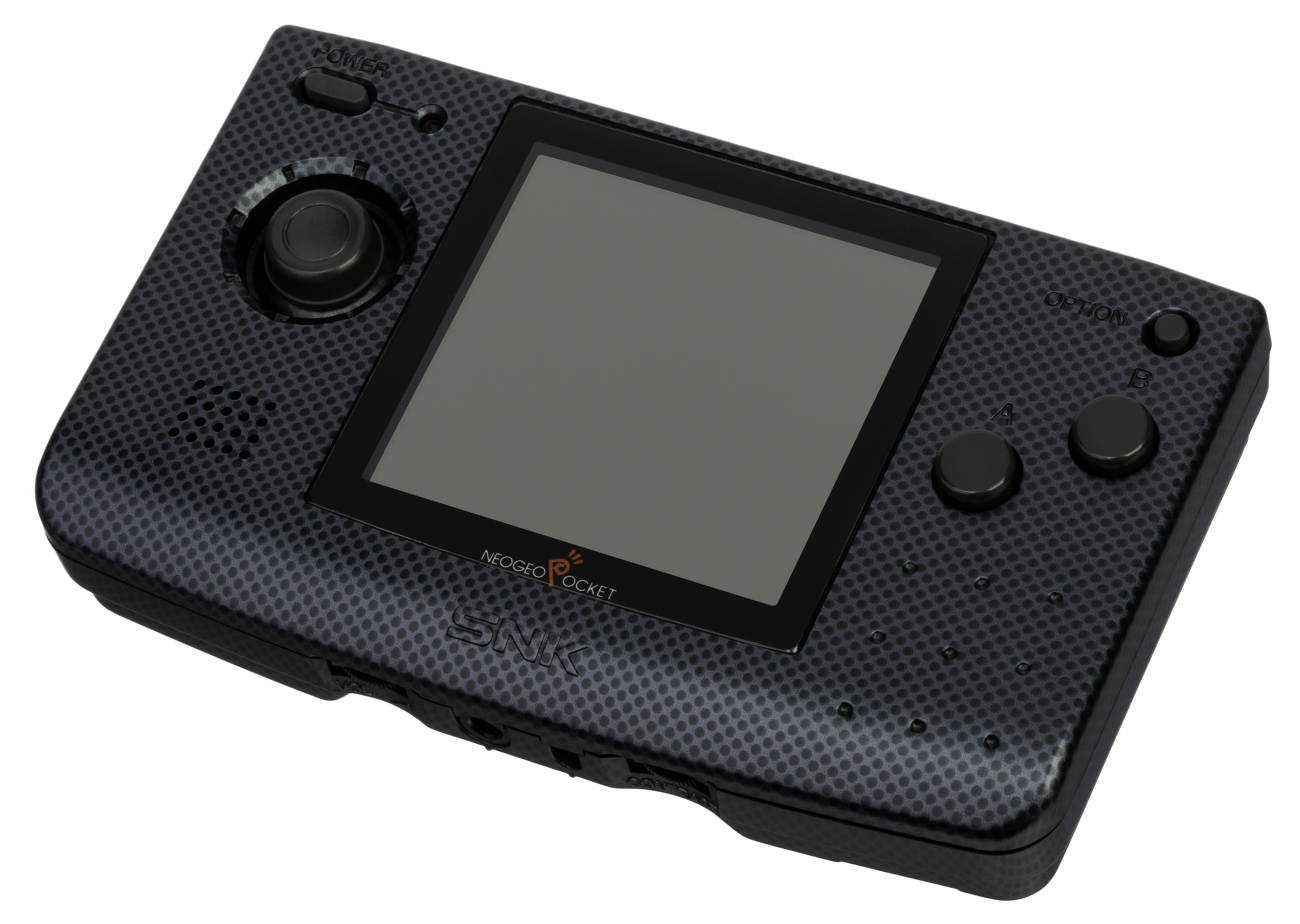
Neo Geo Pocket

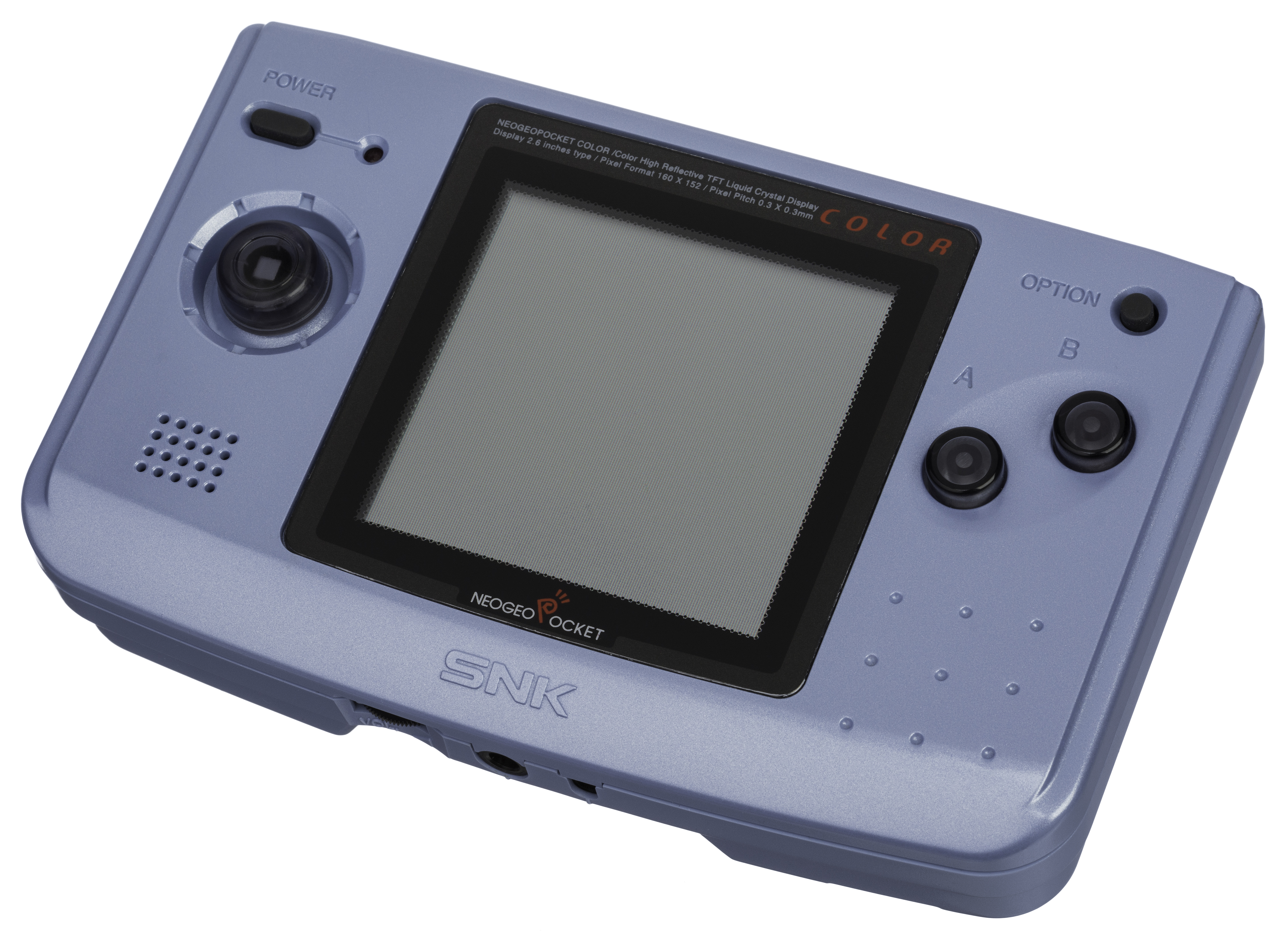
Neo Geo Pocket Color

SNK designed and released the Neo Geo (stylized NEOGEO) on April 26, 1990, an arcade cabinet that could store multiple games in one. It used swappable cartridges as opposed to other arcade machines at the time, and this was a factor in its popularity, a key economic consideration for operators with limited floorspace. The system, known as MVS (Multi Video System), was a big success for SNK and it was the platform from which many of SNK's big franchises originated from. The hardware features comparatively colorful 2D graphics. The hardware was in part designed by Alpha Denshi (later ADK).

The Neo Geo also had a video game console variant, often named the AES (Advanced Entertainment System), using the same cartridge media. Initially, the home system was only available for rent to commercial establishments, such as hotel chains, bars and restaurants, and other venues. When customer response indicated that some gamers were willing to buy a US$650 console, SNK expanded sales and marketing into the home console market. A CD-based equivalent home console was later released, called Neo Geo CD. SNK produced the Neo Geo until 1997 while new software continued to be released for it until 2004. Reincarnations of the Neo Geo continue to be made to this day both by SNK and officially licensed third-parties; the first of these was the Neo Geo X handheld released in 2012, followed by the Neo Geo Mini in 2018.

The company developed and produced a number of other hardware during the 1990s after the Neo Geo, all of which were short-lived and commercially unsuccessful. The Hyper Neo Geo 64 arcade board, released in 1997, was designed to be a modern follow-up to Neo Geo with 3D graphical capabilities, however it was a significant failure and few games were made for the platform. SNK then developed and released the handheld game device Neo Geo Pocket for the Japanese market, and its follow-up Neo Geo Pocket Color with a color display, released globally; both of these were discontinued by 2000 in the West, and then in 2001 when the original SNK went bankrupt.

== Subsidiaries and related corporations ==
=== Current ===
- SNK Entertainment – founded in February 2016 to contract and develop new digital entertainment including video games. It ramps up activity that surrounds SNK's library of intellectual properties with "new and exciting sublicensing opportunities and collaborations".
- SNK Beijing
- SNK Games Singapore
- SNK Asia
- SNK Interactive Co., LTD
- SNK Interactive Corp
- SNK H.K., Ltd. – handles character licensing, as well as hardware and software sales in East Asia (except for Japan)
- SNK Playmore USA Corporation – publisher of software and animation in America. Formerly known as "SNK Corporation of America", which originally handled publishing software sales in America from 1981 to 2000.
- Playmore Entertainment – developer of SNK's Pachinko machines and Metal Slug series.
- KOF Studio - video game development studio and developer of The King of Fighters, Fatal Fury, Samurai Shodown and SNK's other games.
- SNK VS Studio - video game development studio where Katsuhiro Harada is the CEO.

=== Former ===
- ADK – former game developer for the Neo Geo. SNK purchased its intellectual property assets when the company became bankrupt in 2003. Developed Aggressors of Dark Kombat, the Crossed Swords series, Gang Wars, Ninja Combat, Ninja Commando, Ninja Master's: Haō Ninpō Chō, Over Top, Master of Syougi, Sky Soldiers, Sky Adventure, Super Champion Baseball, Time Soldiers, Twinkle Star Sprites, and the World Heroes series.
- BrezzaSoft – co-developer of The King of Fighters 2001 with Eolith.
- Eolith – co-developer of The King of Fighters 2001 with BrezzaSoft, co-developer of The King of Fighters 2002 with Playmore.
- Face Co. Ltd. – developer of Gururin, Money Puzzle Exchanger, and ZuPaPa!.
- Mega Enterprise – co-developer of Metal Slug 4 and Metal Slug 5 with Noise Factory.
- Nazca Corporation – former game developer for the Neo Geo (Metal Slug and Neo Turf Masters), later acquired by SNK
- Neo Geo do Brasil – handled hardware and software sales in Brazil from 1993 to 1998
- Noise Factory – co-developer of Metal Slug 4 and Metal Slug 5 with Mega Enterprise, formerly owned by SNK
- Pallas – developed Eight Man and Super Baseball 2020.
- Sacnoth – developed Dive Alert, Koudelka, and Faselei!.
- Saurus – developed Ironclad, Pleasure Goal: 5 on 5 Mini Soccer, the Shock Troopers series, the Stakes Winner series, and The Irritating Maze. Co-developed Prehistoric Isle 2 with Yumekobo, co-developed Quiz King of Fighters with SNK, and co-developed Ragnagard with System Vision.
- SNK Playmore Europe Corporation – handled software sales in Europe
- Sun Amusement – published Metal Slug 4 and The King of Fighters 2001.
- Viccom – developed Fight Fever.
- Yumekobo – developed Blazing Star, co-developed Prehistoric Isle 2 with Saurus.

== See also ==
- Capcom
- Sega
- Konami
- List of SNK games
- SETA Corporation, former sister company
