= Crash 'n' the Boys: Street Challenge =

1992 video game

- Cover art
- Developer: Technōs Japan
- Publishers: JP: Technōs Japan; NA: American Technos
- Composer: Kazuo Sawa
- Series: Kunio-kun
- Platforms: Nintendo Entertainment System, Game Boy
- Release: NES: JP: June 26, 1992; NA: October 1992; Game Boy: JP: July 16, 1993
- Genre: Sports
- Modes: Single-player, multiplayer

Crash 'n' the Boys: Street Challenge, released in Japan as Bikkuri Nekketsu Shin Kiroku! Harukanaru Kin Medal (Note: Japanese: びっくり熱血新記録！はるかなる金メダル, Hepburn: Bikkuri Nekketsu Shin Kiroku! Harukanaru Kin Medal; lit. "The Astonishing New Records of Nekketsu! Distant Gold Medal"), is a 1992 sports video game developed and published by Technōs Japan for the Nintendo Entertainment System. A Game Boy version of the game was also released in Japan only. The game featured Olympic style contests without rules or regulations, between five teams. The games included 400 metres hurdles, Hammer throw, Swimming, Roof Top Jumping, and Fighting Scene. It was re-released for the Wii Virtual Console on September 14, 2009 and later for the Nintendo 3DS on November 28, 2013 and for the Wii U on December 11, 2014. The game was included in the "Double Dragon & Kunio-kun: Retro Brawler Bundle", with the original Japanese version translated and retitled as Surprise! Nekketsu New Records! The Distant Gold Medal, which was released for the Nintendo Switch on February 20, 2020. It was re-released for Nintendo Switch, Xbox One and PlayStation 4 in April the same year.

== Gameplay ==
The game has four teams to choose from, as well as a fifth computer-controlled team. Each team has five members, each with their own strengths and weaknesses, making some better suited to certain events than others. Before each event, players have the opportunity to go shopping in the mall to buy power-ups for their characters. These items are paid for through the various medals that each team achieves as it progresses through the challenge, but since the winner of the challenge is the team that collects the most medals overall, players must be fairly judicious in how much they spend.

There are two types of events in the game: individual events (Hammer Throw and Roof Top Jumping) and head-to-head events (400 Meter Hurdles, Swimming and Fighting). In individual events, each team takes its turn individually, and ranking is determined by who gets the most points. The head-to-head events take place under a single elimination tournament format, in which one player competes against another in a series of heats. The player who successfully defeats both of his opponents will get to compete against a member of Team Thornley for first place.

The game can be played by up to four players. Since there's never more than two teams competing at the same time, the third and fourth player can play simply by alternating between the two controllers. Thus, a four player adapter is not required, unlike other Kunio-kun games.

== Plot ==
=== Original ===
After the events of Downtown Nekketsu March: Super-Awesome Field Day, Mamoru Todo decides to host another sports competition in order to defeat Kunio.

=== Localization ===
Theodore "Todd" Thornley IV has had enough. After being humiliated once again by his rival, Jeff "Crash" Cooney and his blue-collar buddies from Southside High School at the All-City Track Meet, he has decided to issue a challenge to Crash. Inviting two of the other elite high schools to participate in the challenge, plus an additional team sponsored by his wealthy father, Todd has seemingly stacked the deck against Crash and the boys.

If the player succeeds in winning the Street Challenge with Crash's Southside High School, the ending shows Crash being invited to a meeting with Todd's father, who congratulates Crash on his victory. He attempts to make peace with Crash, explaining that Todd's rivalry with him has made their personal relationship difficult, but Crash doubts that Todd will ever accept a peace offering. Meanwhile, Todd hatches a scheme with Skip to cause dissent amongst Team Thornley against Crash; he offers them flowers and tells them that Crash has been badmouthing them, but before leaving on their flight, they dump the flowers in the trash with a note reading "Todd is a total loser!", showing that Crash has earned their respect as well. Furious, Todd and Crash vow to settle their feud on the ice during hockey season.

== Localization ==
Street Challenge is a localization of Bikkuri Nekketsu Shin Kiroku!, originally part of the Kunio-kun series and a sequel to the 1990 Famicom game Downtown Nekketsu Kōshinkyoku: Soreyuke Daiundōkai. It is the eighth game in the series released for the Famicom and fifth to be localized for the North American market. Like previous localizations of the series (Renegade, Super Dodge Ball, River City Ransom and Nintendo World Cup), the game's graphics and plot were altered to make the game marketable outside Japan. For instance, the actual scenery for the sports events were changed, the four main teams in the Japanese version, Nekketsu, Hanazono, Reiho, and Rengo, were composed of established Kunio-kun characters (such as the Double Dragon twins, Ryuichi and Ryuji) and were all returning characters from Koshinkyoku, and the character roster was changed.

Street Challenge was planned to be the first in a series of Kunio-kun games to be localized under the Crash 'n' the Boys moniker. The ending to Street Challenge features a teaser for the next game in the Crash 'n' the Boys series, Ice Challenge, a localization of the earlier Ike Ike! Nekketsu Hockey Bu (the original final image for Street Challenge showed Momozono, the manager/cheerleader for Team Nekketsu on a swing set in the sunset, with the message "The End" written in hiragana characters). A promotional poster packaged with the SNES game The Combatribes featured the cover artwork of the game, but Ice Challenge was never officially released outside Japan. Other Crash 'n' the Boys games announced by American Technos include Soccer Challenge (Nekketsu Soccer League), Diamond Challenge (Downtown Nekketsu Baseball Monogatari) for the SNES, and the Game Boy version of Street Challenge; all went unreleased.

Crash 'n' the Boys: Street Challenge was released on the Virtual Console service in North America on September 14, 2009 for the Wii, on December 19, 2013 for Nintendo 3DS and on December 11, 2014 for Wii U. While it didn't initially receive a release on NES in PAL regions, it would finally see a release in Europe & Oceania via Virtual Console on Nintendo 3DS and Wii U on November 28, 2013 and December 4, 2014 respectively.

The Game Boy version has few differences compared to the original. Namely, the Swimming event is replaced with an umbrella battle, where the characters jump from a building and fight in mid-air using an umbrella. The CPU-controlled Oklahoma High School is now playable via a cheat code.

== In popular culture ==
"Crash and the Boys" is the name of a band in the comic book series Scott Pilgrim. The band also appears in the 2010 film adaptation of the novels, Scott Pilgrim vs. the World, as well as in the subsequent video game adaptation.

== Reception ==
Corbie Dillard of Nintendo Life gave Crash n the Boys Street Challenge 5 out of 10 stars, commending the developers for 'doing something different' and for what the game could have been, but also wrote that the game, while not horrible in itself was inferior to other similar games.

Lucas Thomas of IGN gave a positive review to the game.
