= River City (video game series) =

Kunio-kun
- Arcade flyer for Nekketsu Kōha Kunio-kun, the first game in the series
- Developers: Technōs Japan; WayForward Technologies; Almanic; A+ Games; Arc System Works
- Publishers: Technōs Japan; SNK; Million Corp. Atlus; Arc System Works
- Creator: Yoshihisa Kishimoto
- Platforms: Arcade, Famicom, Game Boy, Mega Drive, X68000, PC Engine, Super Famicom, Game Boy Advance, Nintendo DS, Virtual Console, iOS, Android, PlayStation 2, WiiWare, Nintendo 3DS, PlayStation 3, PlayStation 4, PlayStation 5, Xbox One, Xbox Series X/S, Switch, Windows, Linux, MacOS
- First release: Nekketsu Renegade Kunio-kun: JP: May 1986
- Latest release: River City Saga: Journey to the West: WW: June 4, 2026

The Kunio-kun (くにおくん) series (typically localized as River City) is a video game series started by Technōs Japan. The series is now handled by Arc System Works who purchased all of the intellectual property rights from Technōs' successor, Million Corp. The first game in the series is fully titled Nekketsu Kōha Kunio-kun (熱血硬派くにおくん), which roughly translates to "Hot Blood Tough Guy Kunio", with Nekketsu being the name of the series' title character Kunio's high school. The kun suffix after his name is an informal Japanese honorific usually applied to young males. The series originated in arcades, before appearing on the Famicom console. Kunio later became Technōs Japan's main mascot, appearing on the company's logo in several games and television commercials.

A few of the early Kunio games for the Nintendo Entertainment System were localized for the North American market. These include Renegade, River City Ransom, Super Dodge Ball, Crash 'n' the Boys: Street Challenge and Nintendo World Cup, which are heavily "Americanized" versions of the Kunio-kun games. Technōs Japan has released over twenty Kunio-kun titles for the Famicom, Game Boy, and Super Famicom in Japan. In addition, licensed ports of the games were made for other platforms such as the PC Engine (through Naxat Soft), Mega Drive (through Pal Soft) and the X68000 (through Sharp).

== Development ==
Kunio as he appears in Downtown Nekketsu Monogatari EX. In the North American version (River City Ransom EX), he is known as Alex.

The original game Nekketsu Kōha Kunio-kun was created by Yoshihisa Kishimoto. He pitched a semi-autobiographical game based on his teenage high school years, with the protagonist Kunio-kun loosely based on himself. Kishimoto recalled his experiences as a high school student regularly getting into fights on a daily basis, which was partly triggered by a break-up with a girl who dumped him. Kishimito was also a fan of Bruce Lee's Hong Kong martial arts films, particularly Enter the Dragon (1973). He combined elements from Lee's Enter the Dragon with that of his own life to create the concept for Nekketsu Kōha Kunio-kun. He went on to design Double Dragon (1987), which was originally envisioned as a direct sequel to the original Kunio-Kun game, before becoming a new game with a different cast and setting.

The game's title and its protagonist, Kunio (variously renamed "Alex" and "Crash Cooney" in the United States), were named after Technōs Japan's former president, Kunio Taki. Many of the later games in the Kunio-kun series, particularly those under the Downtown Nekketsu moniker, were the handiwork of two men: Mitsuhiro "Yoshimitsu" Yoshida and Hiroyuki "Mokeke" Sekimoto.

Renegade, the Western localization of Nekketsu Kōha Kunio-kun, spawned its own separate spin-off series developed by British company Imagine Software for home computers. There were two Renegade sequels: Target: Renegade (1988) and Renegade III: The Final Chapter (1989).

== List of games ==
Game	Details
Nekketsu Kōha Kunio-kun/Renegade Original release date(s): JP: May 1986	Release years by system: 1986 – Arcade; 2006 – PlayStation 2; 2012 – Microsoft Windows
Nekketsu Kōha Kunio-kun/Renegade Original release date(s): JP: May 1986	Notes: The first game in the series, in the original Nekketsu Kōha Kunio-kun (熱血硬派くにおくん; "Hot-Blooded Tough Guy Kunio") the player takes control of Kunio as he fights against the various gangs who bully his friend Hiroshi at the start of each stage.; The international version, titled Renegade, features changed graphics and dubbed voices that gives the game a more western-looking setting. The plot was also changed from Kunio beating gangs to avenge his friend to the main hero having to rescue his girlfriend.; Released for the PlayStation 2 in Japan as part of the Ore-tachi Game Center Zoku lineup on January 26, 2006.
Nekketsu Kōha Kunio-kun/Renegade/Nekketsu Renegade Kunio-kun Original release date(s): JP: April 17, 1987	Release years by system: 1987 – Family Computer; 2008 – Virtual Console
Nekketsu Kōha Kunio-kun/Renegade/Nekketsu Renegade Kunio-kun Original release date(s): JP: April 17, 1987	Notes: Based on the Nekketsu Kōha Kunio-kun arcade game, the Famicom version was Technōs Japan's first game for the home console market.; The final stage features a maze-like structure in which the wrong path leads to a previous stage.; Released in Japan for the Virtual Console on March 18, 2008.
Nekketsu Kōkō Dodgeball Bu/Super Dodge Ball Original release date(s): JP: November 1987	Release years by system: 1987 – Arcade; 1988 – X68000; 2008 – PlayStation 2
Nekketsu Kōkō Dodgeball Bu/Super Dodge Ball Original release date(s): JP: November 1987	Notes: Nekketsu Kōkō Dodgeball Bu (熱血高校ドッジボール部) is the second game starring Kunio and the first sports game starring the character. In this game, Kunio leads his school's dodgeball team (Nekketsu High School) as he competes against the rival Hanazono High School, and then proceeds to compete against five international teams (England, Iceland, China, Africa, and America).; Released in the United States as Super Dodge Ball, in which the Japanese teams became Americans and vice versa.; A port for the X68000 was released in September 1988.; Released for the PlayStation 2 in Japan as part of the Ore-tachi Game Center Zoku lineup on March 23, 2006.
Nekketsu High School Dodgeball Club/Super Dodge Ball Original release date(s): JP: July 26, 1988	Release years by system: 1988 – Family Computer; 2003 – Microsoft Windows; 2008 – Virtual Console
Nekketsu High School Dodgeball Club/Super Dodge Ball Original release date(s): JP: July 26, 1988	Notes: Nekketsu High School Dodgeball Club (Nekketsu Kōkō Dodgeball Bu 熱血高校ドッジボール部; Nekketsu High School Dodgeball Club) is the second Kunio game for the Family Computer. The game adds two new teams, India and the USSR.; The NA version of Super Dodge Ball has the main team as Americans and the final team to be the Soviet Union.; Included in the Kunio-kun Nekketsu Collection 1 for the Game Boy Advance in 2005.; Released for the Virtual Console in Japan on June 17, 2008.
Downtown Nekketsu Story/River City Ransom/Street Gangs Original release date(s): JP: April 25, 1989	Release years by system: 1989 – Family Computer; 1990 – X68000; 1993 – PC Engine; 2007 – Virtual Console
Downtown Nekketsu Story/River City Ransom/Street Gangs Original release date(s): JP: April 25, 1989	Notes: Downtown Nekketsu Story (Downtown Nekketsu Monogatari ダウンタウン熱血物語; Tale of Downtown Nekketsu) is the third Kunio game and the first produced specifically for consoles. Kunio teams up with rival Riki in order to save Riki's girlfriend from the Reihō High School gang. The game is a side-scrolling beat-em-up which combined RPG elements such as buying items and equipment that would increase the player's stats or acquire new moves.; Released in North America as River City Ransom and in Europe as Street Gangs.; The X68000 version, released in April 1990, features a larger map with more areas and new bosses.; The PC Engine Super CD-ROM^{2} version, released on December 24, 1993 in Japan, features an arranged soundtrack in CD-DA format and voice acting.; The Famicom version was released for the Virtual Console in Japan on October 23, 2007.; This game is part of the Japan-only list of games for the Nintendo Classic Mini: Family Computer.
Nekketsu Kōkō Dodgeball Bu: PC Bangai Hen Original release date(s): JP: March 30, 1990	Release years by system: 1990 – PC Engine; 2008 – Virtual Console
Nekketsu Kōkō Dodgeball Bu: PC Bangai Hen Original release date(s): JP: March 30, 1990	Notes: Nekketsu Kōkō Dodgeball Bu: PC Bangai Hen (熱血高校ドッジボール部 PC番外編; Nekketsu High School Dodge Ball Club: PC Extra Edition) is a special version of the original Dodge Ball which combines the graphics and teams of the arcade version with the emphasis on character-specific statistics and team formation. Features an arcade-style mode and a plot-oriented Quest Mode.; Released for the Virtual Console in Japan on September 30, 2008.
Nekketsu High School Dodgeball Club: Soccer Story/Nintendo World Cup Original release date(s): JP: May 18, 1990	Release years by system: 1990 – Family Computer, X68000; 2008 – Virtual Console
Nekketsu High School Dodgeball Club: Soccer Story/Nintendo World Cup Original release date(s): JP: May 18, 1990	Notes: The fourth Kunio game, Nekketsu High School Dodgeball Club: Soccer Story (Nekketsu Kōkō Dodgeball Bu: Soccer Hen 熱血高校ドッジボール部 サッカー編; Nekketsu High School Dodgeball Club: Soccer Edition) features Kunio and the dodgeball team helping Misako, the manager of the Nekketsu Soccer Club, as they participate in a national soccer tournament against other schools. This is one of the few Kunio games which do not feature Riki Samejima.; Released internationally by Nintendo under the title of Nintendo World Cup, in which the game was given a more worldwide theme.; Released for the X68000 in Japan in October 1990.; Released for the Virtual Console in Japan on October 7, 2008.
Downtown Nekketsu March: Super-Awesome Field Day! Original release date(s): JP: October 12, 1990	Release years by system: 1990 – Family Computer; 1992 – PC Engine; 2007 – Virtual Console
Downtown Nekketsu March: Super-Awesome Field Day! Original release date(s): JP: October 12, 1990	Notes: Downtown Nekketsu March: Super-Awesome Field Day (Downtown Nekketsu Kōshinkyoku: Soreyuke Daiundōkai ダウンタウン熱血行進曲 それゆけ大運動会; Downtown Nekketsu March: Let's Go to the Great Athletic Meet) features Nekketsu competing against three other teams (Hanazono, Reiho, and an inter-school union) who compete in a series of four athletic events. Up to four players can participate.; Released for the PC Engine Super CD-ROM^{2} by Naxat Soft in Japan on July 14, 1992.; The Famicom version was released for the Virtual Console in Japan on December 4, 2007.; This game is part of the Japan-only list of games for the Nintendo Classic Mini: Family Computer.; The game was released on the Nintendo Classics service on August 22, 2019 in Japan, and in Western regions on September 6, 2023.
Nekketsu Kōha Kunio-kun: Bangai Rantō Hen Original release date(s): JP: December 7, 1990	Release years by system: 1990 – Game Boy
Nekketsu Kōha Kunio-kun: Bangai Rantō Hen Original release date(s): JP: December 7, 1990	Notes: Nekketsu Kōha Kunio-kun: Bangai Rantō Hen (熱血硬派くにおくん 番外乱闘編, Nekketsu Tough Guy Kunio: The Further Brawls) is the first Kunio game for a portable system.; Released internationally with changed graphics and music as a Game Boy version of Double Dragon II (unrelated to Double Dragon II: The Revenge).
Nekketsu Kōkō Soccer Bu: World Cup Hen Original release date(s): JP: April 26, 1991	Release years by system: 1991 – Game Boy
Nekketsu Kōkō Soccer Bu: World Cup Hen Original release date(s): JP: April 26, 1991	Notes: Nekketsu Kōkō Soccer Bu: World Cup Hen (熱血高校サッカー部 ワールドカップ編; Nekketsu High School Soccer Club: World Cup Edition) is a Game Boy version of Soccer Hen based on the international version of the game (Nintendo World Cup).
Downtown Special: Kunio-kun's Historical Period Drama! Original release date(s): JP: July 26, 1991	Release years by system: 1991 – Family Computer; 1993 – Game Boy; 2009 – Virtual Console; 2011 – Virtual Console (3DS)
Downtown Special: Kunio-kun's Historical Period Drama! Original release date(s): JP: July 26, 1991	Notes: Downtown Special: Kunio-kun's Historical Period Drama! (Downtown Special: Kunio-kun no Jidaigeki da yo Zen'in Shūgō! ダウンタウンスペシャルくにおくんの時代劇だよ全員集合！; Downtown Special: It's Kunio's Period Piece, Assemble Everyone!!) is a follow-up to Downtown Nekketsu Monogatari in which the characters act out a period play.; A Game Boy port was released on December 22, 1993 in Japan. This version of the game was re-released for the Virtual Console (3DS only) on June 7, 2011.; The Famicom version of the game was released for the Virtual Console on May 12, 2009.
Nekketsu Kōkō Dodgeball Bu: Kyōteki! Dodge Soldier no Maki Original release date(s): JP: November 8, 1991	Release years by system: 1991 – Game Boy; 2011 – Virtual Console (3DS)
Nekketsu Kōkō Dodgeball Bu: Kyōteki! Dodge Soldier no Maki Original release date(s): JP: November 8, 1991	Notes: Nekketsu Kōkō Dodgeball Bu: Kyōteki! Dodge Soldier no Maki (熱血高校ドッジボール部強敵！闘球戦士の巻; Nekketsu High School Dodgeball Club: Fierce Rival! Episode of the Dodge Soldiers) is a Game Boy specific version of Nekketsu Kōkō Dodgeball Bu.; It was released for the 3DS Virtual Console in Japan on August 3, 2011.
Nekketsu Kōkō Dodgeball Bu: CD Soccer Hen Original release date(s): JP: December 20, 1991	Release years by system: 1991 – PC Engine; 2008 – Virtual Console
Nekketsu Kōkō Dodgeball Bu: CD Soccer Hen Original release date(s): JP: December 20, 1991	Notes: Nekketsu Kōkō Dodgeball Bu: CD Soccer Hen (熱血高校ドッジボール部 CDサッカー編; Nekketsu High School Dodgeball Club: CD Soccer Edition) is a version of Soccer Hen released for the PC Engine Super CD-ROM^{2} by Naxat Soft. This version has add five national teams (France, Brazil, Argentina, Italy and Germany) in Tournament mode which is after beating the final match.; It was released for the Virtual Console on November 4, 2008.
Go-Go! Nekketsu Hockey Club: Slip-and-Slide Madness Original release date(s): JP: February 7, 1992	Release years by system: 1992 – Family Computer; 2009 – Virtual Console
Go-Go! Nekketsu Hockey Club: Slip-and-Slide Madness Original release date(s): JP: February 7, 1992	Notes: Go Go! Nekketsu Hockey Club: Slip and Slide Madness (Ike Ike! Nekketsu Hockey Bu: Subette Koronde Dairantō いけいけ！熱血ホッケー部「すべってころんで大乱闘」; Go Go! Nekketsu Hockey Club: "Skate, Fall, Great Free-for-All Brawl") centers around Kunio's attempt to help out his school's hockey club.; The game was planned to be released in North America under the title of Crash 'n the Boys: Ice Challenge, but was canceled. A teaser of the game was featured in Crash 'n the Boys: Street Challenge.; It was released for the Wii Virtual Console in Japan on August 18, 2009.
Nekketsu Kōkō Dodgeball Bu: PC Soccer Hen Original release date(s): JP: April 13, 1992	Release years by system: 1992 – PC Engine
Nekketsu Kōkō Dodgeball Bu: PC Soccer Hen Original release date(s): JP: April 13, 1992	Notes: Nekketsu Kōkō Dodgeball Bu: PC Soccer Hen (熱血高校ドッジボール部 PCサッカー編; Nekketsu High School Dodgeball Club: PC Soccer Edition) is a version of Soccer Hen released for the PC Engine HuCard. This version is almost identical to the PC Engine Super CD-ROM^{2} version, but it lacks arranged soundtrack, etc.
Surprise! Nekketsu New Records! The Distant Gold Medal/Crash 'n the Boys: Street Challenge Original release date(s): JP: June 26, 1992	Release years by system: 1992 – Family Computer; 2011 – Virtual Console
Surprise! Nekketsu New Records! The Distant Gold Medal/Crash 'n the Boys: Street Challenge Original release date(s): JP: June 26, 1992	Notes: Surprise! Nekketsu New Records! The Distant Gold Medal (Bikkuri Nekketsu Shinkiroku: Harukanaru Kin Medal びっくり熱血新記録 はるかなる金メダル; Astonishing New Records of Nekketsu: The Distant Gold Medal) is a sequel to Downtown Nekketsu March.; It was released in North America under the title of Crash 'n the Boys: Street Challenge.; It was released for the Virtual Console in Japan on October 18, 2011.
Downtown Nekketsu Kōshinkyoku: Dokodemo Daiundōkai Original release date(s): JP: July 24, 1992	Release years by system: 1992 – Game Boy; 2012 – Virtual Console (3DS)
Downtown Nekketsu Kōshinkyoku: Dokodemo Daiundōkai Original release date(s): JP: July 24, 1992	Notes: Downtown Nekketsu Kōshinkyoku: Dokodemo Daiundōkai (ダウンタウン熱血行進曲 どこでも大運動会; Downtown Nekketsu March: The Great Portable Athletic Meet) is a Game Boy-specific version of Kōshinkyoku.; Released for the Virtual Console in Japan on May 16, 2012.
River City Renegade Original release date(s): JP: August 7, 1992	Release years by system: 1992 – Super Famicom
River City Renegade Original release date(s): JP: August 7, 1992	Notes: River City Renegade (初代 熱血硬派くにおくん; The Original Nekketsu Tough Guy Kunio) is the first Kunio-kun game released for the Super Famicom. It is a beat-em-up RPG set during the end of Kunio's second high school year as he and his friends take a school trip to Osaka.
Nekketsu Kōkō Dodgeball Bu: MD Soccer Hen Original release date(s): JP: August 7, 1992	Release years by system: 1992 – Mega Drive
Nekketsu Kōkō Dodgeball Bu: MD Soccer Hen Original release date(s): JP: August 7, 1992	Notes: Nekketsu Kōkō Dodgeball Bu: MD Soccer Hen (熱血高校ドッジボール部 MDサッカー編; Nekketsu High School Dodgeball Club: MD Soccer Edition) is a Mega Drive-specific version of Soccer Hen. This is the only version where all the teams are playable in the 2 Player Exhibition Mode.
Nekketsu Fighting Legend Original release date(s): JP: December 23, 1992	Release years by system: 1992 – Family Computer
Nekketsu Fighting Legend Original release date(s): JP: December 23, 1992	Notes: Nekketsu Fighting Legend (Nekketsu Kakutō Densetsu 熱血格闘伝説; Nekketsu Fighting Legend) is a tournament-style fighting game.
Kunio-kun's Nekketsu Soccer League Original release date(s): JP: April 23, 1993	Release years by system: 1993 – Family Computer
Kunio-kun's Nekketsu Soccer League Original release date(s): JP: April 23, 1993	Notes: Kunio-kun's Nekketsu Soccer League (Kunio-kun no Nekketsu Soccer League くにおくんの熱血サッカーリーグ) is the Famicom sequel to Soccer Story.
Bikkuri Nekketsu Shinkiroku: Dokodemo Kin Medal Original release date(s): JP: July 16, 1993	Release years by system: 1993 – Game Boy; 2011 – Virtual Console (3DS)
Bikkuri Nekketsu Shinkiroku: Dokodemo Kin Medal Original release date(s): JP: July 16, 1993	Notes: Bikkuri Nekketsu Shinkiroku: Dokodemo Kin Medal (びっくり熱血新記録！どこでも金メダル; The Astonishing New Records of Nekketsu: Portable Gold Medal) is a Game Boy-specific version of Shinkiroku. It also features umbrella that replaces Swimming event from the Famicom version.; It was released for the 3DS Virtual Console in Japan on November 9, 2011.
Kunio's Dodgeball Time, C'mon Guys! Original release date(s): JP: August 6, 1993	Release years by system: 1993 – Super Famicom
Kunio's Dodgeball Time, C'mon Guys! Original release date(s): JP: August 6, 1993	Notes: Kunio's Dodgeball Time, C'mon Guys! (くにおくんのドッジボールだよ全員集合！; It's Kunio's Dodgeball, Assemble Everyone!) is the Super Famicom sequel to the original Dodgeball for the Famicom.; It was released outside Japan for the Nintendo Switch in September 18, 2024 through the Nintendo Classics service without an English localization.
Nekketsu! Street Basketball: All-Out Dunk Heroes Original release date(s): JP: December 17, 1993	Release years by system: 1993 – Family Computer
Nekketsu! Street Basketball: All-Out Dunk Heroes Original release date(s): JP: December 17, 1993	Notes: Nekketsu! Street Basketball: All Out Dunk Heroes (Nekketsu! Street Basket: Ganbare Dunk Heroes 熱血！すとりーとバスケット ～がんばれDunkHeroes～) is the final Kunio-kun game for the Family Computer.
Downtown River City Baseball Story Original release date(s): JP: December 17, 1993	Release years by system: 1993 – Super Famicom
Downtown River City Baseball Story Original release date(s): JP: December 17, 1993	Notes: Downtown River City Baseball Story (ダウンタウン熱血べーすぼーる物語 野球で勝負だ！くにおくん; The Baseball Tale of Downtown Nekketsu: It's a Baseball Match! Kunio-kun) is the third Kunio game for the Super Famicom. This was the first and only game (until Riki Densetsu was released in 2012) in the Downtown Nekketsu series where Kunio is not the main character.
Shin Nekketsu Kōha: Kunio-tachi no Banka Original release date(s): JP: April 29, 1994; WW: February 14, 2022	Release years by system: 1994 – Super Famicom; 2022 – Nintendo Switch, PlayStation 4, PlayStation 5, Xbox One, Microsoft Windows
Shin Nekketsu Kōha: Kunio-tachi no Banka Original release date(s): JP: April 29, 1994; WW: February 14, 2022	Notes: Shin Nekketsu Kōha: Kunio-tachi no Banka (新・熱血硬派 くにおたちの挽歌; The New Nekketsu Tough Guy: The Elegy of Kunio and Co.) is the fourth Kunio game for the Super Famicom. It is chronologically set between Nekketsu Renegade Kunio-Kun and Downtown Nekketsu Story.; Has been re-released and localized by WayForward as River City Girls Zero, with a physical version by Limited Run Games.
Kunio's Oden Original release date(s): JP: May 27, 1994	Release years by system: 1994 – Super Famicom
Kunio's Oden Original release date(s): JP: May 27, 1994	Notes: Kunio's Oden (くにおのおでん) is the final Kunio game for the Super Famicom.
Nekketsu! Beach Volley da yo: Kunio-kun Original release date(s): JP: July 29, 1994	Release years by system: 1994 – Game Boy
Nekketsu! Beach Volley da yo: Kunio-kun Original release date(s): JP: July 29, 1994	Notes: Nekketsu! Beach Volley da yo: Kunio-kun (熱血！ビーチバレーだよ くにおくん) is the last Kunio game for Game Boy.
Kunio no Nekketsu Dodgeball Densetsu Original release date(s): 1996	Release years by system: 1996 – Neo Geo
Kunio no Nekketsu Dodgeball Densetsu Original release date(s): 1996	Notes: Kunio no Nekketsu Dodgeball Densetsu (くにおの熱血闘球伝説), known in English as Super Dodge Ball is the final Kunio game released by Technōs Japan before the company went out of business. The game was never formally released in Japan and only saw limited release as an MVS-only Neo-Geo release in North America.; Co-published and co-distributed with SNK.
Downtown Nekketsu Monogatari EX (ダウンタウン熱血物語 EX) Original release date(s): JP: March 5, 2004	Release years by system: 2004 – Game Boy Advance
Downtown Nekketsu Monogatari EX (ダウンタウン熱血物語 EX) Original release date(s): JP: March 5, 2004	Notes: The first Kunio game produced by Million.; Remake of Downtown Nekketsu Story.; Released in North America as River City Ransom EX.
Kunio-kun Nekketsu Collection 1 (くにおくん熱血コレクション 1) Original release date(s): JP: August 25, 2005	Release years by system: 2005 – Game Boy Advance
Kunio-kun Nekketsu Collection 1 (くにおくん熱血コレクション 1) Original release date(s): JP: August 25, 2005	Notes: 2-in-1 compilation which includes the Famicom versions of Nekketsu High School Dodgeball Club and Nekketsu! Street Basketball.
Kunio-kun Nekketsu Collection 2 (くにおくん熱血コレクション 2) Original release date(s): JP: October 27, 2005	Release years by system: 2005 – Game Boy Advance
Kunio-kun Nekketsu Collection 2 (くにおくん熱血コレクション 2) Original release date(s): JP: October 27, 2005	Notes: 2-in-1 compilation which includes the Famicom versions of Nekketsu High School Dodgeball Club: Soccer Story and Downtown Nekketsu March.
Kunio-kun Nekketsu Collection 3 (くにおくん熱血コレクション 3) Original release date(s): JP: February 16, 2006	Release years by system: 2006 – Game Boy Advance
Kunio-kun Nekketsu Collection 3 (くにおくん熱血コレクション 3) Original release date(s): JP: February 16, 2006	Notes: 2-in-1 compilation which includes the Famicom versions of Downtown Special and Nekketsu Hockey Club.
River City Dodge Ball All Stars!! Original release date(s): 2007	Release years by system: 2007 – Microsoft Windows
River City Dodge Ball All Stars!! Original release date(s): 2007	Notes: Independently published Dodge Ball game developed by Miracle Kidz, a dōjin group formed by Mitsuhiro Yoshida and Hiroyuki Sekimoto, the original game designers of River City Ransom and most of the other Famicom Kunio games.; The Japanese title is Downtown Dodgeball da yo Zen'in Shūgō!! (ダウンタウン ドッジボールだよ全員集合!!; "It's Downtown Nekketsu Dodgeball, Assemble Everyone!!").; Trial downloads (in Japanese and English) are available on Miracle Kidz' official site.
Super Dodgeball Brawlers Original release date(s): JP: March 19, 2008	Release years by system: 2008 – Nintendo DS
Super Dodgeball Brawlers Original release date(s): JP: March 19, 2008	Notes: Released in Japan as Chō Nekketsu Kōkō Kunio-kun Dodgeball Bu (超熱血高校くにおくんドッジボール部; Super Nekketsu High School Kunio's Dodgeball Club).; Super Dodge Ball sequel developed by Arc System Works.
Nekketsu Dodgeball Bu i<b (熱血ドッジボール部i) Original release date(s): JP: March 25, 2008	Release years by system: 2008 – i-mode
Nekketsu Kōkō! Kunio-kun Online (熱血高校！ くにおくん オンライン) Original release date(s): 2008 (closed), October 22, 2010	Release years by system: 2008 – Microsoft Windows
Nekketsu Kōkō! Kunio-kun Online (熱血高校！ くにおくん オンライン) Original release date(s): 2008 (closed), October 22, 2010	Notes: Online game developed by Windysoft which began closed beta testing in 2008 until October 22, 2010.
Downtown Smash Dodgeball Original release date(s): JP: August 25, 2009; NA: August 25, 2009	Release years by system: 2009 – Xbox 360
Downtown Smash Dodgeball Original release date(s): JP: August 25, 2009; NA: August 25, 2009	Notes: Released in Japan as Downtown Gekitotsu Dodgeball!, and the second Dodge Ball game developed by Miracle Kidz.
River City Super Sports Challenge Original release date(s): JP: February 4, 2010; NA: October 12, 2010	Release years by system: 2010 – Nintendo DS
River City Super Sports Challenge Original release date(s): JP: February 4, 2010; NA: October 12, 2010	Notes: Released in Japan as Kunio-kun no Chō Nekketsu! Daiundōkai (くにおくんの超熱血! 大運動会).; A follow-up to Downtown Nekketsu March was developed by Arc System Works, but the game does not follows the plot of its predecessors. Instead, the game is likely a new storyline than a sequel. This is also the first Kunio game to features Mission mode.
River City Soccer Hooligans Original release date(s): JP: May 27, 2010; NA: June 9, 2010	Release years by system: 2010 – Nintendo DS
River City Soccer Hooligans Original release date(s): JP: May 27, 2010; NA: June 9, 2010	Notes: Released in Japan as Kunio-Kun no Chō Nekketsu! Soccer League Plus – World Hyper Cup Hen (くにおくんの超熱血! サッカーリーグぷらすワールド・ハイパー・カップ編).; A follow-up to Nekketsu High School Dodgeball Club: Soccer Story (known as Nintendo World Cup in internationally), although the game is not a direct sequel. Instead, it was continuing from River City Super Sports Challenge, and that Michael Tobioka returns (along with Stanislav and Sierra).
Downtown Nekketsu Dodgeball (ダウンタウン熱血どっじぼーる) Original release date(s): JP: July 12, 2011	Release years by system: 2011 – WiiWare
Downtown Nekketsu Dodgeball (ダウンタウン熱血どっじぼーる) Original release date(s): JP: July 12, 2011	Notes: The third Dodge Ball game developed by Miracle Kidz. Unlike the first two Dodge Ball games, Million had involvement in the development of this game.
Nekketsu Kōha Kunio-Kun Special Original release date(s): JP: December 15, 2011; KOR: September 14, 2012	Release years by system: 2011/2012 – Nintendo 3DS
Nekketsu Kōha Kunio-Kun Special Original release date(s): JP: December 15, 2011; KOR: September 14, 2012	Notes: A remake of Nekketsu Renegade Kunio-Kun to celebrate the franchise's 25th anniversary. The game features characters from the Nekketsu Renegade, Nekketsu High School and Downtown Nekketsu series in their Downtown Nekketsu rendition. The Double Tiger Brothers from Nekketsu Fighting Legend, are also featured.
Riki Densetsu Original release date(s): JP: December 12, 2012	Release years by system: 2012 – Nintendo 3DS
Riki Densetsu Original release date(s): JP: December 12, 2012	Notes: Riki Densetsu (りき伝説, Legend of Riki) is a Kunio-kun spin-off starring Kunio's rival/partner Riki as the main character. It is also the second game not to feature Kunio as the main character.
River City: Tokyo Rumble Original release date(s): JP: August 8, 2013; NA: September 27, 2016; EU: September 27, 2016	Release years by system: 2013/2016 – Nintendo 3DS
River City: Tokyo Rumble Original release date(s): JP: August 8, 2013; NA: September 27, 2016; EU: September 27, 2016	Notes: Released in Japan as Nekketsu Kōha Kunio-Kun SP: Rantō Kyōsōkyoku (熱血硬派くにおくんSP 乱闘協奏曲, Hot-Blooded Tough Guy Kunio SP: Brawl Concerto), it would later be released in other regions by Natsume Inc.
River City: Knights of Justice Original release date(s): JP: April 30, 2014; NA: June 20, 2017; EU: June 20, 2017	Release years by system: 2014/2017 – Nintendo 3DS
River City: Knights of Justice Original release date(s): JP: April 30, 2014; NA: June 20, 2017; EU: June 20, 2017	Notes: Released in Japan as Nekketsu Mahō Monogatari (熱血魔法物語, Hot-Blooded Magic Story), this is a spin-off featuring characters from Downtown Nekketsu Story in a fantasy RPG setting. It was only released as a downloadable eShop title.
Kunio-Kun no Nekketsu Street Original release date(s): JP: March 26, 2015	Release years by system: 2015 – Android, iOS
Downtown Nekketsu Jidaigeki Original release date(s): JP: May 28, 2015	Release years by system: 2015 – Nintendo 3DS
Downtown Nekketsu Jidaigeki Original release date(s): JP: May 28, 2015	Notes: A follow-up to Downtown Special: Kunio-kun's Historical Period Drama!.
River City Super Sports Challenge ~All Stars Special~ Original release date(s): JP: March 5, 2015; NA: October 28, 2015	Release years by system: 2015 – PlayStation 3, Microsoft Windows
River City Super Sports Challenge ~All Stars Special~ Original release date(s): JP: March 5, 2015; NA: October 28, 2015	Notes: Released in Japan as Downtown Nekketsu Kōshinkyoku: Soreyuke Daiundōkai ~All Star Special~, it is a follow-up to Downtown Nekketsu March and River City Super Sports Challenge. It's published by H2 Interactive outside Japan. Outside of Asia it was only released as a downloadable title.
River City: Rival Showdown Original release date(s): JP: October 27, 2016; NA: November 21, 2017; EU: November 21, 2017	Release years by system: 2016/2017 – Nintendo 3DS; 2023 - Nintendo Switch, PlayStation 4, Microsoft Windows (Steam)
River City: Rival Showdown Original release date(s): JP: October 27, 2016; NA: November 21, 2017; EU: November 21, 2017	Notes: Released in Japan as Downtown Nekketsu Monogatari SP, it is a remake of Downtown Nekketsu Story to celebrate the franchise's 30th anniversary. It also includes a fighting game called Fighting of Double Dragon (Double Dragon Duel in the English version). The 3DS version was released outside Japan by Natsume Inc.
Kunio-kun Nekketsu Complete: Famicom Hen Original release date(s): JP: December 8, 2016	Release years by system: 2016 – Nintendo 3DS
Kunio-kun Nekketsu Complete: Famicom Hen Original release date(s): JP: December 8, 2016	Notes: A compilation of 11 classic Kunio Famicom games: Nekketsu Renegade Kunio-kun, Nekketsu High School Dodgeball Club, Downtown Nekketsu Story, Nekketsu High School Dodgeball Club: Soccer Story, Downtown Nekketsu March, Kunio-kun's Historical Period Drama!, Go Go! Nekketsu Hockey Club, Surprise! Nekketsu New Records: The Distant Gold Medal, Nekketsu Fighting Legend, Kunio-kun's Nekketsu Soccer League, and Nekketsu! Street Basketball.
River City Melee: Battle Royal Special Original release date(s): JP: December 26, 2016; NA: March 28, 2017; EU: March 28, 2017	Release years by system: 2016/2017 – PlayStation 4, Microsoft Windows
River City Melee: Battle Royal Special Original release date(s): JP: December 26, 2016; NA: March 28, 2017; EU: March 28, 2017	Notes: Released in Japan as Downtown Rantō Kōshinkyoku: Kachinuki Kakutō SP (ダウンタウン乱闘行進曲 かちぬきかくとうSP, Downtown Brawl March: Win Through Fighting SP), it is a follow-up to the Kōshinkyoku / Super Sports Challenge series. It is published by H2 Interactive outside Japan. It was released as a physical copy in North America by Limited Run Games, with a cover inspired by the River City Ransom cover.
River City Ransom: Underground Original release date(s): WW: February 17, 2017	Release years by system: 2017 – Linux, MacOS, Microsoft Windows (Steam, GOG.com)
River City Ransom: Underground Original release date(s): WW: February 17, 2017	Notes: Released as Downtown Nekketsu Monogatari Underground (ダウンタウン熱血物語アンダーグラウンド) in Japan.; Developed by Conatus Creative.; In 2026, the game was removed from the square due to the expiration of the copyright holders' license.
Double Dragon & Kunio-kun Retro Brawler Bundle Original release date(s): JP: December 20, 2018; WW: February 20, 2020	Release years by system: 2018/2020 – Nintendo Switch, PlayStation 4, Xbox One; TBA - Microsoft Windows (Steam)
Double Dragon & Kunio-kun Retro Brawler Bundle Original release date(s): JP: December 20, 2018; WW: February 20, 2020	Notes: Released as Kunio-kun: The World Classics Collection in Asia.; A compilation of classic Kunio Famicom games, it contains the 11 games from Kunio-kun Nekketsu Complete: Famicom Hen as well as the western versions of Renegade, Super Dodge Ball, River City Ransom, Crash 'n' the Boys: Street Challenge, Double Dragon, Double Dragon II, and Double Dragon III. Online play has been added to all of these titles.
River City Girls Original release date(s): WW: September 5, 2019	Release years by system: 2019 – Nintendo Switch, PlayStation 4, Xbox One, Microsoft Windows (Steam, GOG.com); 2020 – Amazon Luna; 2022 – PlayStation 5; 2023 – Android
River City Girls Original release date(s): WW: September 5, 2019	Notes: Released in Japan as Nekketsu Kōha Kunio-kun Gaiden Ribā Shitī Gāruzu (熱血硬派くにおくん外伝 River City Girls(リバーシティガールズ); "Hot-Blooded Tough Guy Kunio Side-Story River City Girls").; Features Kyoko and Misako as playable characters, rescuing Kunio and Riki.; Developed by WayForward under supervision from Arc System Works. It was released as a physical copy in Asia, and in North America by Limited Run Games.
River City Melee Mach!! Original release date(s): WW: October 10, 2019	Release years by system: 2019 – Nintendo Switch, PlayStation 4, Microsoft Windows (Steam)
River City Melee Mach!! Original release date(s): WW: October 10, 2019	Notes: Released in Japan as Downtown Rantō Kōshinkyoku Mach (ダウンタウン乱闘行進曲マッハ, Downtown Brawl March Mach), it is a brawling game that is an updated version of Kachinuki Kakutō SP.
Stay Cool, Kobayashi-san! A River City Ransom Story Original release date(s): WW: November 7, 2019	Release years by system: 2019 – Nintendo Switch, PlayStation 4, Xbox One, Microsoft Windows (Steam)
Stay Cool, Kobayashi-san! A River City Ransom Story Original release date(s): WW: November 7, 2019	Notes: Nekketsu Kōha Kunio-kun Gaiden Ikasuze! Kobayashi-san (熱血硬派くにおくん外伝 イカすぜ！小林さん, Hot-Blooded Tough Guy Kunio Side Story: Stay Cool, Kobayashi-san!) is a spin-off starring Masao Kobayashi from Downtown Nekketsu Story, taking place after that title.
River City Saga: Three Kingdoms Original release date(s): JP: December 16, 2021; WW: July 21, 2022	Release years by system: 2021 - Nintendo Switch; 2022 - PlayStation 4, Microsoft Windows (Steam)
River City Saga: Three Kingdoms Original release date(s): JP: December 16, 2021; WW: July 21, 2022	Notes: Released in Japan as Kunio-kun no Sangokushi da yo Zeiin Shūgō! (くにおくんの三国志だよ 全員集合！, It's Kunio's Records of the Three Kingdoms: Everyone Assemble!), it sees familiar characters such as Guan Yu (Kunio), Liu Bei (Gouda), and Zhang Fei (Godai) run-amok in the world of Romance of the Three Kingdoms.
River City Girls 2 Original release date(s): JP: December 1, 2022; WW: December 15, 2022	Release years by system: 2022 – Nintendo Switch, PlayStation 4, PlayStation 5, Windows, Xbox One, Xbox Series X/S
River City Girls 2 Original release date(s): JP: December 1, 2022; WW: December 15, 2022	Notes: Released in Japan as Nekketsu Kōha Kunio-kun Gaiden Ribā Shitī Gāruzu 2 (熱血硬派くにおくん外伝 River City Girls(リバーシティガールズ) 2; "Hot-Blooded Tough Guy Kunio Side-Story River City Girls 2").; Developed by WayForward under supervision from Arc System Works.
River City Saga: Three Kingdoms Next Original release date(s): WW: November 5, 2024	Release years by system: 2024 – Nintendo Switch, PlayStation 4, Microsoft Windows (Steam): Released in Japan as Downtown Special Kunio-kun no Sangokushi da yo Man'in Onrei!! (ダウンタウンスペシャル くにおくんの三国志だよ 満員御礼！！, Downtown Special: It's Kunio's Records of the Three Kingdoms: Full House, Thank You!!).; A follow up to River City Saga: Three Kingdoms.
Super Technos World: River City & Technos Arcade Classics Original release date(s): WW: April 24, 2025	Release years by system: 2025 – Nintendo Switch, PlayStation 5, Windows (Steam)
Super Technos World: River City & Technos Arcade Classics Original release date(s): WW: April 24, 2025	Notes: Released in Japan as Technos The World: Kunio-kun & Arcade Collection (テクノス ザ・ワールド くにおくん & アーケードコレクション).; A compilation of classic Kunio and other Super Famicom and arcade games: River City Renegade, Kunio's Dodgeball Time, C'mon Guys!, Downtown River City Baseball Story ~Play Ball, Kunio!~, Kunio's Oden, Super Dodge Ball for Neo Geo, Xain'd Sleena, China Gate, both versions of The Combatribes, Shadow Force, SugoroQuest++ -Dicenics-, and DunQuest.; SugoroQuest++ -Dicenics- and DunQuest are not localized in English.
River City Saga: Journey to the West Original release date(s): WW: June 4, 2026	Release years by system: 2026 – Nintendo Switch, PlayStation 5, Windows (Steam)
River City Saga: Journey to the West Original release date(s): WW: June 4, 2026	Notes: Released in Japan as Kunio-kun no Nekketsu Saiyūki Tenjiku Rantō Hen (くにおくんの熱血西遊記 天竺乱闘編, Kunio-kun's Hot-Blooded Journey to the West: Tianzhu Brawl Edition).; A Kunio take on the classic Journey to the West story, where all four protagonists are played by Kunio; Features rogue-lite elements.

== Manga ==
A gag manga based on the video games was produced titled Ore wa Otoko Da! Kunio-kun (おれは男だ! くにおくん). The manga was illustrated by Kosaku Anakubo and was serialized in the monthly anthology CoroCoro Comic from 1991 to 1996, lasting 11 collected editions. Ore wa Otoko Da! was awarded the Shogakukan Manga Award for children's manga in 1995.
