= Double Dragon II (Game Boy) =

1990 video game

- North American box art, also used for Double Dragon III: The Sacred Stones
- Developer: Technōs Japan
- Publishers: NA/EU: Acclaim Entertainment; JP: Technōs Japan
- Director: Shin'ichi Saito
- Designers: Hiroyuki Kikuchi; Masahiro Yoshihara
- Composer: Kazuo Sawa
- Series: Double Dragon; Kunio-kun
- Platform: Game Boy
- Release: JP: December 7, 1990; NA: December 1991; EU: 1991; WW: 1991
- Genre: Beat 'em up
- Modes: Single-player, multiplayer

Double Dragon II is a 1990 beat 'em up video game developed by Technōs Japan for the Game Boy. Although it is the second Double Dragon game released for the Game Boy, it is unrelated to the arcade and NES game Double Dragon II: The Revenge. The game is a localization of the 1990 Japanese Game Boy game Nekketsu Kōha Kunio-kun: Bangai Rantō Hen (熱血硬派くにおくん 番外乱闘編; "Hot Blooded Tough Guy Kunio: The Further Brawls), which was part of Technōs Japan's Kunio-kun series. The graphics, music, and storyline were changed for the English version of the game. In Japan, it was re-released for the Nintendo 3DS Virtual Console on August 8, 2012.

== Gameplay ==
The player takes control of martial artist Billy Lee, who is being hunted down by an organization called the "Scorpions" for murdering one of its members. The objective of the game is to fight off the members of the Scorpions and confront the true culprit, a rival martial artist named Anderson. A second player can join in anytime via the use of a Game Link Cable, taking control of Billy's brother, Jimmy.

The combat system is simpler compared to previous Double Dragon games, including the first Game Boy game. The player can perform a series of punches or a kick on most enemies, followed by a straight punch or a high kick that knocks the enemy to the floor. Pressing the A and B buttons simultaneously will cause the player to kneel. While kneeling, pressing either button will cause the player to perform an aerial uppercut. Instead of the hair grab from previous games, the player will do a collar grab (similar to Renegade), in which the player can repeatedly punch the opponent in the face or push them to the ground. While standing near a fallen enemy, a jumping knee drop can be performed. Despite the presence of armed enemies, the player cannot disarm them and pick up their weapons like in other games in the series.

The game is composed of three missions, spread across ten stages. The first two missions each consist of four stages that follow a basic structure: the player fights through a street to a boss at the end. This is followed by a subway platform, a fight inside a subway car, and the destination platform, where the player confronts another boss. The final mission, composed of only two stages, starts at the streets again, but this time the player must fight to the entrance of the Scorpions headquarters. Once inside the building, the player fights enemies through a series of floors, including an area where all the previous bosses appear, eventually reaching the top floor where Anderson awaits. The game has three difficulty settings, but the Easy setting only allows the first mission to be played.

== Regional differences ==
The Japanese version, Nekketsu Kōha Kunio-kun: Bangai Rantō Hen, was released on December 7, 1990. The Japanese version features completely different graphics (drawn in a style similar to Downtown Nekketsu Monogatari, the Japanese version of River City Ransom), music, some plot from Double Dragon II, and characters (with Kunio and Riki being replaced by Billy and Jimmy in the export versions). While the play mechanics and overall structure of the game are relatively unchanged, the backgrounds and enemies were largely redrawn; the Stage 8 boss, originally a towering wrestler, was redrawn and reprogrammed as an equally towering ninja armed with a claw and smoke bombs.

Before Acclaim bought the publishing rights to the game and retooled it as Double Dragon II along with the European version, American Technos Inc. had plans to localize it as a sequel to the original Renegade titled The Renegades for US version and Double Dragon II for EU version. This earlier version had a similar plot to the released game, in which the protagonist (named McClain in this version) is framed for a murder only in the US version.
