= Mikuriya =

Mikuriya (written: 御厨) is a Japanese surname. Notable people with the surname include:

- Kei Mikuriya (御厨 景, born 1977), Japanese footballer
- Kunio Mikuriya (御厨 邦雄), Japanese Secretary General of the World Customs Organization
- Tod H. Mikuriya (1933–2007), American cannabis researcher
- Takafumi Mikuriya (御厨 貴文, born 1984), Japanese footballer

== See also ==
- Mikuriya Station (disambiguation), multiple railway stations in Japan
