= River City Girls =

2019 video game

- Developer: WayForward
- Publisher: WayForward: JP: Arc System Works; Crunchyroll Games (mobile)
- Directors: Adam Tierney; Bannon Rudis
- Producers: David White; Glenn Seidel; Takaomi Kaneko
- Designer: Nick Garcia
- Programmer: James Guintu
- Artists: Priscilla Hamby; Valeriya Sanchilo
- Writers: Adam Tierney; Bannon Rudis
- Composers: Megan McDuffee; Chipzel; Dale North; Nathan Sharp
- Series: Kunio-kun
- Engine: Unity
- Platforms: Nintendo Switch; PlayStation 4; Windows; Xbox One; PlayStation 5; Android; iOS
- Release: September 5, 2019; Amazon Luna; October 20, 2020; PlayStation 5; WW: January 20, 2022; JP: June 23, 2022; Android, iOS; November 7, 2023
- Genre: Beat 'em up
- Modes: Single-player, multiplayer

River City Girls (Note: Nekketsu Kōha Kunio-kun Gaiden Ribā Shitī Gāruzu (Japanese: 熱血硬派くにおくん外伝 ( River City Girls(リバーシティーガールズ)) lit. Hot-blooded Tough Guy Kunio Side Story: River City Girls) is a 2019 beat 'em up video game developed and published worldwide by WayForward and published in Japan by Arc System Works. A spin-off in the Kunio-kun franchise, the game stars Misako and Kyoko, who fight their way through enemies and obstacles to rescue their kidnapped boyfriends, series protagonists Kunio and Riki. The game was released for the Nintendo Switch, PlayStation 4, Windows, and Xbox One in September 2019, and for Amazon Luna in October 2020. A PlayStation 5 version was released on January 18, 2022.

Shin Nekketsu Kōha: Kunio-tachi no Banka (1994), in which Misako and Kyoko previously appeared, was localized by WayForward as a prequel, River City Girls Zero, being released for the Nintendo Switch on February 14, 2022 and September 21 on other platforms. A sequel, titled River City Girls 2, was released by WayForward and Arc System Works that same year in December for Japan, the rest of Asia and the US.

== Gameplay ==
River City Girls is a beat 'em up brawler. The player can choose between Kyoko or Misako, who play similarly but have unique moves and animations. Two players can play a local cooperative mode with both. Waves of enemies and occasional bosses are out to oppose the chosen character(s). The player progresses through six areas in a linear manner similar to Shodai Nekketsu Kōha Kunio-kun and Shin Nekketsu Kōha: Kunio-tachi no Banka.

Like River City Ransom, the player is free to return to previous areas, but they must complete certain battles and objectives to go to the new locations in their current area. In many areas where combat is initiated the first time, chains and a lock will surround the edges of the screen. At this point, the player will be unable to leave the area until all enemies are defeated. There are six bosses in the game; to be able to advance to the next area, the player must defeat the boss of the current area.

Defeated enemies drop money for the player to collect, just as in River City Ransom. Money can be spent at various shops to purchase items, food, and gear to increase stats. Money can also be used to purchase new fighting moves from the Dojo to complement the starting basic set. Abilities are all simple to perform, being a direction + a button; complexity for advanced players lies in chaining the simple moves together into long combos. Characters also gain experience points and level-ups from defeating enemies, as in River City Ransom: Underground. Completion of quests grant experience and money rewards to both characters, ensuring that the one that the player is not using in a single player game does not fall behind in levels or money. As bosses are defeated in the game, enemies become stronger. Upon defeating the final enemy in an area, they might surrender. The player can choose to either defeat the enemy as normal, or to recruit them. Recruited enemies can be summoned to assist the player, although only one recruit is kept at a time. The player can pick up various objects during the game and use them as improvised weapons, but they will break after being used multiple times.

If the player loses all their stamina bar and is defeated (or both characters defeated in multiplayer), the player must restart the current room and lose a portion of their cash on hand, but their health is fully restored. In multiplayer, if only one character is knocked out, it is possible for the other player to revive them by standing over their fallen body and repeatedly kicking their departing soul back into it. An angel leaving the character's body acts as a timer so that the other player can perform the revival as fast as possible.

Once introduced, Kunio-kun character Godai will offer players numerous side quests. There are also various NPCs that the player can interact with. After completing the game once, the player will unlock Kunio and Riki as playable characters.

== Plot ==
Misako (voiced by Kayli Mills) is in detention at River City High, accompanied by her best friend Kyoko (Kira Buckland). She receives an alarming message on her phone: a picture of Kunio (Greg Chun) and Riki (Kaiji Tang), the heroes of River City High and their boyfriends, seemingly being kidnapped. Kyoko and Misako decide to spring into action to rescue their boyfriends. The pair rampages across the city, attacking any suspicious person they find while seeking answers.

== Development ==
River City Girls single-player gameplay as Misako; four attacking enemies inside a mall.

River City Girls is the first collaboration between Arc System Works and WayForward, and the second time that WayForward works on an intellectual property that previously belonged to Technōs Japan Corp, having previously worked on Double Dragon Neon. The game was in development for nearly three years, but was only announced in April 2019.

River City Girls was directed by Adam Tierney and Bannon Rudis, the latter of whom had previously worked on River City Ransom: Underground. Tierney approached Rudis with the idea to co-direct a new entry in the Kunio-kun series and take the game in a new "goofy, zany direction". Once Rudis saw what Tierney had done, he agreed to work on the game. The goal was to create a River City Ransom game in the style of Shantae (WayForward's flagship series), more expressive and larger in presentation than previous games in the Kunio-kun franchise. The aim of the game was to exude style, with each character having their own unique moves that would accentuate their personalities. As assistant director, Rudis tried to make the game's fighting mechanics as close to an Arc System Works fighting game as possible while minimizing the play controls and inputs to make the game have more in common with the Super Smash Bros. games or Dragon Ball FighterZ. Rudis worked with the game's lead animator Kay Yu to decide how each attack should look. The game was conceived with pixel art to connect it to previous games in the franchise. Rudis and Tierney focused on atmosphere with locations that feel "completely immersive" for the player to focus on the story.

A director at WayForward introduced Tierney to Shin Nekketsu Kōha: Kunio-tachi no Banka, during development and he instantly loved both Kyōko and Misako, the two playable female characters in the game. WayForward wanted these two characters to take the lead role as they have already created games with strong female protagonists. During development, Tierney learned from Arc System Works that Kyōko and Misako were no longer acting as the girlfriends for the main protagonists of the franchise, Kunio and Riki. Riki had been with Mami longer than Kyōko (she was Riki's girlfriend in only two games) while Hasebe is often linked with Kunio (though she is only his love interest in Downtown Special: Kunio-kun no Jidaigeki da yo Zen'in Shūgō!). This led to discussions of creating a rivalry between the girls for the game's plot. Although River City Girls is billed as a canonical game in the Kunio-kun franchise, the game does not follow the continuity started with Nekketsu Kōha Kunio-kun Special, and it also ignores and contradicts old continuity from previous games in the franchise.

Most of the game's staff was new, mostly regarding art, music, and animation. Composer "Chipzel" did most of the boss battle music and arranged the boss theme from the original River City Ransom. Megan McDuffee composed the tracks for the stages, cinematics, menus, and nearly everything else; some of McDuffee's pieces include vocal tracks she sung. McDuffee also arranged music from River City Ransom and Kunio-tachi no Banka. NateWantsToBattle and Dale North also contributed to the soundtrack, such as in the opening and ending songs. Priscilla "Rem" Hamby, the illustrator of the webcomic Devil's Candy, was sought out to re-imagine the Kunio-kun characters. Hamby also illustrated the cutscenes. Cristina Vee directed the voice actors as well as participated in the soundtrack. Unlike many Japanese media, the English lines were recorded first and then the Japanese voice actors had to match them, when normally the reverse is true. Mills and Buckland also recorded their lines together. WayForward VFX artist Jordan Vine animated the sequences while Kevin Samuels from WayForward's SFX department added sound effects.

== Release ==
River City Girls was released in September 2019, generally over digital distribution channels such as the Nintendo eShop, PlayStation Network (PSN), Xbox Games Store, Steam, and GOG.com.

Limited Run Games released physical editions of the game for Nintendo Switch and PlayStation 4, which also includes a Collector's Edition that included several add-ons.

Following criticisms, WayForward altered the game's secret ending via a post-launch update in January 2020. The game was later released for Amazon's Luna streaming service on October 20 the same year.

A PlayStation 5 version was released in January 2022, with owners of the PlayStation 4 version getting the PS5 version for free.

Versions for Android and iOS were released by Crunchyroll on November 7, 2023 as part of their Crunchyroll Game Vault service.

== Legacy ==
A sequel, River City Girls 2 was released in December 2022. In addition, Kunio-tachi no Banka was localized in 2022 as River City Girls Zero.

== Reception ==
Reception

Aggregate score
Aggregator	Score
Metacritic	NS: 79/100; PS4: 79/100; XONE: 80/100

Review scores
Publication	Score
Destructoid	8/10
Game Informer	7/10
Nintendo Life	9/10
Nintendo World Report	8/10
USgamer	3.5/5

River City Girls received "generally favorable" reviews from critics and a score of 79 according to review aggregator Metacritic, based on 16 reviews for the PlayStation 4 version and 12 reviews for the Nintendo Switch version. Reviewers generally praised the game's art style, graphics, and sense of humor. The soundtrack was called out for special praise. The game's inventive bosses were considered a strength, and the two-player co-operative mode was praised as well. Some of the more ambivalent reviewers felt that the beat 'em up action was ultimately a tad repetitive, while others pointed out that the RPG elements such as equipping accessories were often so minor as to be ignorable. The original ending to the game was also called out as "unsatisfying".

In 2023, Time Extension included the game on their top 25 "Best Beat 'Em Ups of All Time" list. They called it the best game in the series.
