= River City Soccer Hooligans =

2010 video game

- North American box art
- Developer(s): Avit-Niigata
- Publisher(s): JP: Arc System Works; NA: Aksys Games
- Platform(s): Nintendo DS
- Release: JP: May 27, 2010; NA: June 10, 2010
- Genre(s): Sports
- Mode(s): Single-player, multiplayer

River City Soccer Hooligans (Note: Known in Japan as Kunio-kun no Chō Nekketsu! Soccer League Plus World・Hyper・Cup Hen (くにおくんの超熱血!サッカーリーグぷらす ワールド・ハイパー・カップ編).) is a sports game for the Nintendo DS. It was developed by Avit-Niigata, and published by Arc System Works (the eventual rights owner of the entire video games in Kunio-kun series) in Japan on May 27, 2010, and in North America, published by Aksys Games on June 10. This was the last Kunio-kun game for the Nintendo DS, as starting with Nekketsu Kōha Kunio-Kun Special handheld entries in the series were released for the Nintendo 3DS instead.

== Summary ==
The game is based on Kunio Kun no Nekketsu Soccer League for the Famicom which was developed by Technōs Japan on April 23, 1993. Soccer League Plus is not a sequel to its two predecessors, but a continuation of Chō Nekketsu! Daiundōkai/River City Super Sports Challenge in which Michael Tobioka and his crews are back.

== See also ==
- List of Nintendo DS games
- Kunio-kun
