= Kunio =

- Gender: Male

Origin
- Origin: Japanese
- Meaning: Different meanings depending on the kanji used

Kunio (written: 邦夫, 邦男, 邦雄, 邦生, 國男, 國士, 国男, 国夫, 州男 or 久仁生) is a masculine Japanese given name. Notable people with the name include:

- Kunio Busujima (毒島 邦雄; 1925–2016), Japanese businessman
- Kunio Egashira (江頭 邦雄; 1937–2008), Japanese businessman
- Kunio Hamada (濱田 邦夫; born 1936), Japanese judge
- Kunio Hatoyama (鳩山 邦夫; 1948–2016), Japanese politician
- Kunio Hiramatsu (平松 邦夫; born 1948), Japanese mayor
- Kunio Ishii (石井 邦生; born 1941), Japanese Go player
- Kunio Iwahashi (岩橋 邦雄; born 1939), Japanese field hockey player
- Kunio Katō (加藤 久仁生; born 1977), Japanese animator
- Kunio Kishida (岸田 國士; 1890–1954), Japanese dramatist and writer
- Kunio Kitamura (北村 邦夫; born 1968), Japanese footballer
- Kunio Kobayashi (小林 國雄; born 1948), Japanese bonsai artist
- Kunio Kobayashi (小林 邦雄; born 1967), Japanese karateka
- Kunio Lemari (1942–2008), Marshallese politician and President of the Marshall Islands
- Kunio Maekawa (前川 國男; 1905–1986), Japanese architect
- Kunio Maruyama (丸山 邦雄; 1903–1981), Japanese businessman, adventurer, and college professor
- Kunio Masaoka (正岡 国男; 1908–1978), Japanese photographer
- Kunio Mikuriya (御厨 邦雄; born 1954), Secretary General of the World Customs Organization
- Kunio Murai (村井 國夫; born 1944), Japanese actor and voice actor (not to be confused with the manga character of the same name)
- Kunio Nakagaki (中垣 國男; 1911–1987), Japanese politician
- Kunio Nakagawa (中川 州男; 1898–1944), Japanese general
- Kunio Nakamura (中村 邦夫; 1939–2022), Japanese businessman
- Kunio Nagayama (永山 邦夫; born 1970), Japanese footballer
- Kunio Naitō (内藤 國雄; born 1939), Japanese shogi player
- Kunio Ogawa (小川 国夫; 1927–2008), Japanese writer
- Kunio Okawara (大河原 邦男; born 1947), Japanese mechanical designer
- Kunio Shibata (柴田 国男; born 1948), Japanese cross-country skier
- Kunio Shimizu (清水 邦夫; 1936–2021), Japanese playwright
- Kunio Shiota (塩田 邦郎; born 1950), Japanese life scientist
- Kunio Tsuji (辻 邦生; 1925–1999), Japanese writer
- Kunio Yamazaki (died 2013), Japanese biologist
- Kunio Yanagita (柳田 國男; 1875–1962), Japanese folklorist and ethnologist
- Kunio Yonehara (米原 邦夫; born 1941), Japanese water polo player
- Kunio Yonenaga (米長 邦雄; born 1943–2012), Japanese shogi player

== Fictional characters ==
- Kunio Yamagata, a character in the manga series Miss Machiko
- Kunio Murai (村井 國男), a character in the manga/anime Great Teacher Onizuka (not to be confused with the actor of the same name)
- Kunio, the title character of Kunio-kun, a Japanese video game franchise
