= Target: Renegade =

1988 video game

- Developers: Imagine Software; Software Creations (NES)
- Publishers: Imagine Software; Taito America (NES)
- Designers: Dave Collier; Mike Lamb; Dawn Drake; Jonathan Dunn; Gary Biasillo; Simon Butler; John Palmer; Martin McDonald
- Composers: Tim Follin (NES); Gary Biasillo (C64)
- Platforms: ZX Spectrum, Commodore 64, Amstrad CPC, NES
- Release: 1988; NES: March 1990
- Genre: Beat 'em up
- Modes: Single-player, multiplayer

Target: Renegade (stylized as TARGET; RENEGADE) is a beat'em up video game released on the Amstrad CPC, Commodore 64 and ZX Spectrum systems in the late 1980s by Ocean Software on their "Imagine" label, as well as a Nintendo Entertainment System version developed by Software Creations and published by Taito. The game is a sequel to Renegade and was followed by Renegade III: The Final Chapter. When acquiring the license to convert the original arcade game Renegade to home computers, Ocean acquired the option to produce and release their own home-computer-only sequels to the game, and Target Renegade was the first of these sequels.

== Gameplay ==
On most formats, the game caters for one or two players and concerns itself with the adventures of a streetfighter (or a pair of identical streetfighters) known only as "Renegade", who seek(s) revenge against a local crime kingpin named "Mr. Big" for murdering Matt, "Renegade"'s brother. Other versions have said Matt was not murdered, but instead held hostage by Mr. Big and the player needs to free him. In the Spectrum version, "Mr. Big" holds "Renegade"'s girlfriend as hostage. The player character varies, depending on the format, but is usually represented as topless apart from a leather vest and wearing jeans. Early stages show the player outdoors and after defeating a boss character, reaching a pay phone to report on his progress.

Regardless of the format, the cover of the game and the title screen (as seen on the adjacent image) portrays a topless street fighter performing a flying kick through a window. In keeping with video game box art and advertising of the era, the character shown in this illustration bears little relation to any character in the game itself. The actual picture is based on famous martial artist Joe Lewis from the cover of his book The World's Greatest Fighter Teaches You How To Master Bruce Lee's Fighting System, but has been adjusted so as to fit in with the character of Renegade.

The game comprises five levels, though details of enemies and weapons vary from one version to another (the NES version in particular is more like Double Dragon than the home computer versions). The NES and C64 versions of the game do not have a two-player co-operative mode.

== Reception ==
Reception

Review scores
Publication	Score
Crash	90%
Computer and Video Games	35/40
Electronic Gaming Monthly	4/10, 4/10, 5/10, 5/10 (NES)
Sinclair User	10/10
Your Sinclair	9/10; 90%
ACE	653
The Games Machine	85%

Awards
Publication	Award
Your Sinclair	Megagame
Crash	Crash Smash
Amstrad Action	Mastergame

The ZX Spectrum version was voted number 13 in the Your Sinclair Readers' Top 100 Games of All Time.

== Legacy ==
Ocean Software produced a second Renegade sequel titled Renegade III: The Final Chapter. Technos Japan Corp., the developers of the original arcade version of Renegade, produced their own line of sequels and spin-offs to Nekketsu Kōha Kunio-kun, the Japanese version of Renegade, for the Japanese market. Target: Renegade and Renegade 3 are not related in any way to the Kunio-kun series.

In 2006 an unofficial remake of the Spectrum version was released for Windows. Expanding the multiplayer element to allow six simultaneous players, Target: 2006 received a 70% score in issue 41 of Retro Gamer.
