= Acrobatic Dog-Fight =

1984 video game

Acrobatic Dog-Fight Dog-Fight
- Arcade flyer
- Developer: Technos
- Publisher: Technos
- Platform: Arcade
- Release: 1984
- Genre: Multidirectional shooter
- Modes: Single-player, multiplayer

Acrobatic Dog-Fight (published in Japan as Dog-Fight - Batten O'Hara no Sucharaka Kuuchuu-sen) is a multidirectional shooter released in arcades by Technos in 1984. The graphics and gameplay are similar to 1982's Time Pilot from Konami.

== Gameplay ==
Screenshot

In Acrobatic Dog-Fight the playing field is limited with a ceiling and ground as well as an ultimate destination to navigate to. Acrobatic Dog-Fight also adds two buttons, a secondary weapon and an eject button. Eject can be used at any time and makes it possible to hijack enemy planes and continue flying them. If the pilot fails to hijack an enemy plane he would parachute to the ground where a standard plane waits nearby.
