= Nekketsu Fighting Legend =

1992 video game

- Front cover of Nekketsu Fighting Legend
- Developer: Technōs Japan
- Publisher: Technōs Japan
- Series: Kunio-kun
- Platform: Family Computer
- Release: JP: December 23, 1992
- Genre: Fighting
- Modes: Single-player, multiplayer

Nekketsu Fighting Legend (Nekketsu Kakutō Densetsu 熱血格闘伝説, lit. "Hot Blooded Fighting Legend") is a 1992 tournament-style fighting game developed and published by Technōs Japan in Japan for the Family Computer on December 23, 1992. It is a spin-off of the Kunio-kun series, as well as Technōs Japan's first attempt in the genre since their port of their Double Dragon arcade game on the same platform. Technōs Japan later became better known for its Neo Geo titles, such as Double Dragon fighting game and Voltage Fighter Gowcaizer.

It is also the first fighting game to allow up to four players to play simultaneously against each other. In order for more than two players to play, a multitap (like the 4-Players Adaptor by Hori) is required.
