= River City: Tokyo Rumble =

2013 video game

- The North American box art for River City: Tokyo Rumble
- Developer: Aplus
- Publishers: JP: Arc System Works; NA/EU: Natsume
- Series: Kunio-kun
- Platform: Nintendo 3DS
- Release: JP: August 8, 2013; NA: September 27, 2016; EU: September 29, 2016
- Genre: Beat 'em up
- Modes: Single-player, multiplayer

River City: Tokyo Rumble (Note: Japanese: 熱血硬派くにおくんSP 乱闘協奏曲, Hepburn: Nekketsu Kōha Kunio-Kun SP: Rantō Kyōsōkyoku; lit. Hot-Blooded Tough Guy Kunio SP: Brawl Concerto) is a 2013 beat 'em up video game developed by Aplus and published by Arc System Works for the Nintendo 3DS. It was released by Natsume outside Japan in 2016. It is similar to River City Ransom with RPG-like mechanics and doing jobs to learn new moves. It also features a 4-player arena and dodgeball modes that use download play. Unlike other games in the Kunio-kun series, Tokyo Rumble did not alter its characters and setting upon localization.

== Plot ==
Kunio, a delinquent student at Nekketsu High School, comes out one day to find his friend Hiroshi being beaten up by Wataru Sasaki and Sakata, who are students from Hanazono High School. Kunio confronts the students and is told that their leader Riki, Kunio's longtime rival and friend, was the one who gave the order. Kunio travels to meet Riki, who denies calling the attack on Hiroshi. The culprit is revealed to be Riki's subordinates, who declare that they have joined a new organization of gang students called "Tokyo Lion Alliance" that stands poised to conquer all of Tokyo.

Accompanied by Riki, a biker gang leader named Shinji, and the physically huge girl delinquent Misuzu, Kunio travels through Tokyo fighting the various leaders of the Tokyo Lion Alliance: masked muscleman Demon Lion, the deceptively dangerous girl boss Rouge Lion, and the powerful pair known as Twin Lions. They are also frequently brought to a confrontation with Silver Lion (Shirogaine), who used to be in Shinji's biker gang until he joined under the command of the Alliance's main boss: Ultra Lion.

Kunio confronts Ultra Lion and defeats him, but Ultra Lion is shot by the true masterminds behind the Lion Alliance: the Sanwakai crime boss Sabu and his older brother Lee. Seeking revenge on Kunio for being defeated in the past, Sabu kidnaps Kunio's teacher Madoka and uses her to lure him to Hong Kong, where they have a final confrontation on a movie set. Kunio defeats Sabu and Lee, rescues Madoka, and returns to his hometown with his friends.

== Reception ==
Reception

Aggregate scores
Aggregator	Score
GameRankings	70%
Metacritic	69/100

Review scores
Publication	Score
Destructoid	7/10
GameSpot	7/10
Nintendo Life	7.6/10

River City: Tokyo Rumble received positive reception upon release, with aggregators such as Metacritic and GameRankings giving the game near 70 with others, such as Destructoid and GameSpot, giving it a 7.
