= Popeye: Ijiwaru Majo Seahag no Maki =

1994 video game

- Developer(s): Technos Japan
- Publisher(s): Technos Japan
- Composer(s): Chiaki Iizuka; Kiyomi Kataoka; Reiko Uehara
- Platform(s): Super Famicom
- Release: JP: August 12, 1994
- Genre(s): Action
- Mode(s): Single-player; Multiplayer (controlling 2 Popeyes in split screen mode)

Popeye: Ijiwaru Majo Seahag no Maki (ポパイいじわる魔女シーハッグの巻, Popai Ijiwaru Majo Shīhaggu no Maki, lit. Popeye: The Tale of Sea Hag the Wicked Witch) is a video game for the Super Famicom game console based on the popular Popeye franchise. It was released by Technos Japan on August 12, 1994 exclusively in Japan.

== Plot ==
After countless defeats at the hands of Popeye, the evil Sea Hag has devised a fool proof plan for revenge. She turns all of Popeye's friends into stone by removing their hearts and scattering the pieces across the corresponding islands. Now Popeye must search for the hearts within each of five islands in order to revive them. It won't be easy, as General Bunzo and his troops has issued a "100,000,000G" bounty for the hearts. This prompts the likes of Bolo and Ox to try and collect the hearts for the reward. Upon reading this, Brutus decides to quest for the hearts as well in a plan to impress Olive. Thus making this a race against time for Popeye to save his friends and put a stop to Sea Hag's plan.

== Gameplay ==
As Popeye, players will have to fight their way through different villains such as Bolo, Ox, Emok, General Bunzo and his troops, Bernard the Buzzard, the boss for most levels Brutus, and the main boss Sea Hag.

The beginning of each stage starts by showing the player which character must be saved. The game's stages feature board-game-like overworld maps in which the players take turns moving up to the number of spaces allowed by an on-screen spinner. The pieces of the heart of the character to be rescued are scattered onto random spaces of the map which the space will appear as an enclosed heart. When selecting a space, the player will be sent to a side-scrolling platformer level which players will have to complete in the allotted time given.

Popeye's primary weapon is a large anchor and chain which he carries on his shoulder and uses like a whip. Popeye can obtain power-ups for support, such as a tire to bowl over enemies, a propeller anchor for reaching high platforms, and a frog suit which allows the player to become a frog for better maneuverability in water courses. There are also items that inflict damage to people on the map such as a bomb and lighting anchor. During boss battles Popeye can obtain spinach to give the player invincibility and ability to use their fist near the end of the battle.
