= Popeye Beach Volleyball =

1994 video game

- Developer(s): Technōs Japan
- Publisher(s): Technōs Japan
- Composer(s): Taku Urabe
- Platform(s): Game Gear
- Release: JP: August 12, 1994
- Genre(s): Summer sports
- Mode(s): Single-player, multiplayer

Popeye: Beach Volleyball (ポパイのビーチバレーボール) is a summer sports-related Game Gear video game that was released exclusively in Japan. The game was based on the comic strip of same name created by E. C. Segar.

== Summary ==
This video game involves Popeye (from the classic animated cartoon of the same name) and the sport of beach volleyball. The object is to score 15 points while preventing the opponent (consisting of Popeye's adversaries) from doing the same. Despite the Popeye franchise being popular in North America, it was never released there due to licensing reasons that ultimately kept the game in Japan.
