= Renegade (video game) =

1986 video game

- North American arcade flyer
- Developer: Technōs Japan (Note: Amiga, Apple II, and DOS versions developed by Software Creations; Amstrad CPC, Atari ST, Commodore 64 and ZX Spectrum versions developed by Ocean Software; Master System version developed by Natsume.)
- Publishers: Taito: Amiga, Atari ST, C64; NA: Taito; EU: Ocean Software CPC, ZX Spectrum Ocean Software Master System Sega
- Designer: Yoshihisa Kishimoto
- Composer: Kazuo Sawa
- Series: Kunio-kun
- Platform: Arcade: NES, ZX Spectrum, Amstrad CPC, Commodore 64, Amiga, Atari ST, Thomson MO5, MS-DOS, Apple II, Master System
- Release: May 1986: Arcade; JP: May 1986; NA: September 1986; EU: 1987 NES; JP: April 17, 1987; NA: January 1988 ZX Spectrum; UK: May 1987 C64; EU: 1987; NA: July 1988 CPC; EU: 1987 Amiga, Atari ST; EU: 1988; NA: April 1989 MS-DOS; NA: April 1989 Apple II; NA: October 1989 Master System; EU: July 1993
- Genre: Beat 'em up
- Modes: Single-player, multiplayer

Nekketsu Kōha Kunio-kun (Note: Japanese: 熱血硬派くにおくん, Hepburn: Nekketsu Kōha Kunio-kun; lit. "Hot-Blooded Kunio-kun"), released as Renegade in the West, is a 1986 beat 'em up video game developed by Technōs Japan and published by Taito for arcades. In the original Japanese version, the game revolves around Kunio, a high school delinquent who must stand up against a series of rival gangs that are targeting his classmate Hiroshi. In the Western version, the player controls a street brawler who must face four different gangs in order to rescue his girlfriend, who is being held captive by a mob boss.

Conceptualized and designed by Yoshihisa Kishimoto, the game was semi-autobiographical, partly based on his own teenage high school years getting into daily fights, with Kunio partly based on himself. He also drew inspiration from the Bruce Lee martial arts film Enter the Dragon (1973), which inspired the game's "knock-down-drag-out" fights, along with his own altercations as a youth. In order to make the game more appealing for the West, Technos produced a graphically-altered version with a visual style inspired by the 1979 film The Warriors, changing the looks of some of the game's characters and scenery.

It was an important game that defined the beat 'em up genre, establishing the standard gameplay format adopted by later games in the genre. In contrast to earlier side-scrolling martial arts games such as Kung-Fu Master (1984), Nekketsu Kōha Kunio-kun introduced key elements such as the belt scroll format where players can move horizontally and vertically in a scrolling arena-like space, a combat system incorporating combo attacks, the standard three-button control scheme, and a street brawling theme. It was the basis for Kishimoto's next game Double Dragon (1987), which further advanced and popularized its beat 'em up genre format.

The game was ported to a variety of game consoles and home computer platforms. Nekketsu Kōha Kunio-kun was the first game in the long-running Kunio-kun series in Japan. The game's Western localization Renegade also spawned its own spin-off series from British company Ocean Software on home computers, with the sequels Target: Renegade (1988) and Renegade III: The Final Chapter (1989).

== Gameplay ==
Arcade version of Renegade, the Western localized version of Nekketsu Kōha Kunio-kun

The game is presented from an isometric perspective, with character sprites and backgrounds rendered in a three-quarter perspective, and the player able to move in horizontal and vertical directions around the arena. The arcade game is controlled by a joystick and three action buttons, for punch, kick and jump. Compared to other side-scrolling games in its time, the combat system was more highly developed, with the player able to punch, kick, grab, charge, throw and stomp enemies. It also introduced the use of combo attacks; in contrast to earlier games, the opponents in Nekketsu Kōha Kunio-kun could take much more punishment, requiring a succession of punches, with the first hit temporarily immobilizing the enemy, making him unable to defend himself against successive punches.

=== Controls ===
The player controls a fighter (in the NES version, he is named "Mr. K" in-game, and "Renegade" in the instruction manual) who must fight a variety of street gangs on the way to save his girlfriend from the gangsters. The controls consists of an eight-way joystick and three actions buttons; left attack, jump and right attack. Unlike previous beat-'em-ups such as Kung-Fu Master (1984), Shao-lin's Road (1985) or My Hero (1985), in which the player character's movement was limited to only left or right, in Renegade the player can also move towards or away from the background by pressing up or down in a matter similar to Technos Japan's 1985 wrestling game Mat Mania, although the battle system is still limited to only two directions. Pressing the attack button of the character's current direction will cause him to throw punches, while the opposite attack button causes him to perform a rear kick instead. When certain enemies are stunned after a few punches or a single kick, the player character can approach him for a collar grab and kick him repeatedly with the front attack button or perform a shoulder throw with the opposite attack button. While jumping, the player can press either attack button for a jump kick towards that particular direction.

Pressing the joystick left or right twice quickly will cause the player to run, at which point pressing the front attack button will perform a running punch, jumping will automatically perform a flying kick, and the rear attack button will bring the player to a sudden halt and perform a back-kick. Pressing down over a fallen enemy will make the player sit on top of them, at which point pressing the front attack will cause the player to pummel them. All of the boss characters (with the exception of Sabu) can only be sat on or put on a collar grab if their health is low enough, otherwise they will push the player off.

The player has a limited amount of lives (which vary depending on the game's DIP settings) and no continues to complete the game. The player loses a life if they run out of health after sustaining too many enemy attacks, get knocked off the subway platform or into the sea in the first two stages or fail to complete the stage under the time limit. Health is automatically recovered at the start of each stage. Stages 2 and 4 are the only stages to have checkpoints in the middle of them.

=== Stages ===
Unlike Technos' subsequent game Double Dragon, the playing field is limited to a series of three-screen-wide areas and does not scroll continuously. The first three stages (a subway platform, a harbor and a street alley) each take place in a single area where the player must face against a gang of seven underlings with their boss watching from the background. The gang of the first two stages consists of two types of underlings: an armed thug who is easier to defeat, and an unarmed thug who can take more punishment and can grab the player character from behind.

When only three underlings remain (in any combination of the two) their boss will come in from the sidelines and join the fight. When the boss (Jack in the first stage, Joel in the second) is defeated, any remaining underling will retreat off the bottom of the screen, and the stage ends. Each boss character has their own health displayed underneath the player's. The second stage follows this same formula, but begins with a series of enemies riding motorcycles trying to run the player down. Once a certain number of bikers have been defeated (which vary depending on the difficulty level), the normal enemies will begin to face the player. The third stage features an all female gang. Like the first two gangs, the female gang also consists of two type of underlings: a weaker chain-wielding blond-haired type and a more resistant mace-wielding redhead type. The female gang leader (Kim) is a large woman who can easily grab and slap the player around. She is the only enemy in the game who cannot be put into a collar grab. The fourth and final stage consists of two areas and only has one type of underling, a bald knife-wielding hitman who can kill the player with a single stab. The first area is set in a parking lot where the player must fight against four of these hitmen. Once this first wave of enemies have been defeated, the player character automatically proceeds to enter a building at the far right of the stage. Inside, he faces three more knife-wielding underlings and the final boss, a handgun-wielding mobster (Sabu) who can kill the player with a single shot. Once the final boss is defeated, the main character exits the building and is greeted by his rescued girlfriend, who proceeds to give him a kiss. The game then begins the next loop with an increased difficulty.

== Development ==
Japanese sales flyer for Nekketsu Kōha Kunio-kun, displaying the main character and enemies

The game was conceptualized by Yoshihisa Kishimoto at Technōs Japan. He previously worked at Data East, where he created the successful laserdisc games Cobra Command (1984) and Road Blaster (1985). Technōs Japan, which was founded by Data East alumni, attempted to recruit him and called him for a meeting. Kishimoto instead pitched a different idea he had in mind, one that did not require laserdisc technology. He instead pitched a semi-autobiographical game based on his teenage high school years, with the protagonist Kunio loosely based on himself. Kishimoto recalled his experiences as a high school student regularly getting into fights on a daily basis, which was partly triggered by a break-up with a girl who dumped him. Kishimito was also a fan of Bruce Lee's Hong Kong martial arts films, particularly Enter the Dragon (1973). He combined elements from Lee's Enter the Dragon with that of his own life to create the concept for Nekketsu Kōha Kunio-kun.

In contrast to earlier side-scrolling martial arts action games, most notably Irem's Kung-Fu Master (1984), Kunio-kun greatly increased the amount of health available to the player and the enemies. This allowed Kishimoto to create gameplay centered around the "knock-down-drag-out" fights, as seen in Bruce Lee films such as Enter the Dragon as well as the altercations Kishimoto had himself experienced in his youth. Rather than one-hit kills, his idea was that the player needed to hit enemies multiple times, "beating them up" in order to defeat them. Compared to earlier side-scrollers, the environment was expanded to a scrolling arena-like space, while the combat system was more highly developed.

The use of an isometric perspective, combined with separate buttons for punching and kicking, also meant that the player character could no longer press up to jump like in Kung-Fu Master. To compensate, an additional jump button was added instead, resulting in the standard three-button beat 'em up control scheme.

== Localization and ports ==
Renegade is a localization of the Japanese Nekketsu Kōha Kunio-kun for the North American and worldwide markets, with the game's graphics changed in an attempt to adapt the game's setting to a more western style (with what can be seen as thinly veiled 'inspiration' from the film The Warriors). The gangs of thugs and bikers featured in Renegade were originally high school delinquents, bōsōzoku members, a sukeban along with her minions, and finally yakuza members in Kunio-kun. The subway level in the first stage was originally a Japanese train station, whereas most of the signs and billboards in the last two stages were also written in Japanese. The title of the Japanese version was influenced by Konami's arcade game, Shinnyuushain Tooru-Kun (known outside Japan as Mikie).

Instead of the damsel-in-distress plot of Renegade, Kunio-kun instead featured the titular high school student, Kunio (くにお), standing up for his bullied friend Hiroshi. Each stage begins with the stage's gang beating up Hiroshi in front of Nekketsu High School and Kunio chasing after his attackers. Unlike Renegade, Kunio and the game's bosses are identified by name in-game, whereas the characters in Renegade are simply identified by the generic identifier "1P" or "2P" (depending on who is playing) and "BOSS" (it was not until the NES version that bosses in Renegade were given names). The bosses of Kunio-kun are: Riki (りき), Shinji (しんじ), Misuzu (みすず) and Sabu (さぶ). The game ends with Hiroshi and several students of Nekketsu High School greeting Kunio outside Sabu's hideout, with Hiroshi giving Kunio a firm handshake. The game begins a new cycle, this time skipping the pre-stage introductions. Like Renegade, each character has a catch-phrase said by them in digitized voice, but spoken in Japanese.

The Family Computer version of Kunio-kun was Technōs Japan's first game for a home console. After Nekketsu Kōha Kunio-kun, Technos Japan reused the Kunio character for several more games, beginning with Nekketsu Kōkō Dodgeball Bu (the Japanese version of Super Dodge Ball) released for the arcades and the Famicom/NES. Some were released overseas, such as River City Ransom (the American version of Downtown Nekketsu Monogatari), Nintendo World Cup (Nekketsu Kōkō Dodgeball Bu: Soccer Hen) and Crash 'n the Boys: Street Challenge (Bikkuri Nekketsu Shin Kiroku!), but most of them were released only in Japan. Kunio eventually became Technōs Japan's official mascot, appearing on the company's logos in the intros of some of their later games, as well as in their Japanese television advertisements.

== Ports ==
Master System port cover art

The Nintendo Entertainment System version, developed in-house by Technos, is a strong departure from the original arcade game; the first three stages each consist of a series of two-screens wide levels against a group of three enemies at a time, culminating in a one-on-one fight with the boss. The second stage also contains a side-scrolling motorcycle chase, in which the player tries to kick opponents off their motorcycles, prior to the boss fight. In the third stage, the player can choose from one of two paths after clearing the first level of enemies: one leads to a confrontation against the stage boss, while the other is a second level filled with weaker enemies. The fourth and final stage is a maze of numerous rooms, filled with enemies and previous bosses, inside a building which the player must proceed in order to reach the final boss. There are trap doors in this stage which warp the player back to a previous stage, forcing the player to begin all over.

Home computer versions were released for the Amiga, Apple II and IBM PC in North America and for the Amstrad CPC, ZX Spectrum, Atari ST and Commodore 64 in Europe. The American computer ports were developed by Software Creations and published by Taito, whereas the European computer ports were published by Ocean Software on their Imagine label. An Apple IIGS port was developed and advertised by Taito Software in 1988, with actual screen-shots shown, but never released. The Commodore 64 version was programmed by Ocean's Stephen Wahid. The home computer versions were typically limited to one fire button rather than three; the different moves are achieved by combining different joystick directions with a fire button press. The Amstrad CPC version mimicked the three-button control of the original by combining the joystick control with the cursor keys. The Spectrum and Amstrad versions use flip-screen rather than scrolling levels.

The Master System version, developed by Natsume and published by Sega, is based largely on the NES port rather than the original arcade, but with enhanced graphics and several improvements like new death cutscenes and a revamped ending. This port was only released in Europe, Australia and Brazil.

== Reception ==
Reviews (home computers)

Review scores
Publication	Score		
Publication	C64	PC	ZX
Crash			89%
Computer and Video Games	80%	88% (CPC)	86%
Sinclair User			8/10
The Games Machine (UK)		87% (CPC)	82%
Your Sinclair			9/10
Zzap!64	90%		
Retro Gamer		90% (8-bit)	

Award
Publication	Award
Your Sinclair	YS Megagame

In Japan, it was the top-grossing title on the Game Machine table arcade cabinet charts in July 1986, and became the fifth highest-grossing table arcade game during the latter half of 1986. The arcade game sold about 5,500 units in Japan.

The Famicom port sold around 400,000 units. In the United Kingdom, the home computer port went straight to the top of the Gallup weekly all-formats chart in September 1987. It also topped the ZX Spectrum charts from September to October 1987, and then it was number three the following month.

The game was voted by Your Sinclair readers as the second best game of 1987. In 1993, the Spectrum version was voted number 48 on the Your Sinclair "Readers' Top 100 Games of All Time" list.

David M. Wilson reviewed the game for Computer Gaming World, saying that the arcade feel was carried over into the personal computer versions of Renegade, in which the players feel like martial arts fighters.

== Legacy ==
The NES port of Renegade was released for the Wii's Virtual Console in North America on May 5, 2008 at a cost of 500 Wii Points. It was re-released on February 27, 2014 both on the 3DS Virtual Console and Wii U Virtual Console.

The arcade version of the game was released by Hamster Corporation for the PlayStation 4 in 2015 and Nintendo Switch in 2018 as part of their Arcade Archives series. This port includes both the US and Japanese versions of the original arcade edition, making it the first time the original Nekketsu Kōha Kunio-kun was released in the west commercially.

=== Impact ===
Nekketsu Kōha Kunio-kun is considered the "first fully-developed beat ’em up" game, according to Andrew Williams. While elements of the genre were previously present in earlier side-scrolling martial arts action games, most notably Kung-Fu Master, Renegade introduced a number of key elements that more clearly defined the beat 'em up genre and established the standard format adopted by later games in the genre.

The game set the standard for future beat 'em up games as it introduced the ability to move both horizontally and vertically, in a scrolling arena-like space, commonly called the belt scroll action game format. Its combat system was also more highly developed than earlier side-scrolling action games, such as its introduction of combo attacks. Nekketsu Kōha Kunio-kun also introduced street brawling to the beat 'em up genre, with the international version Renegade taking it further by adding an underworld revenge plot, proving more popular with gamers than the principled combat sports of earlier martial arts games.

=== Sequels and related games ===
Nekketsu Kōha Kunio-kun spawned the separate Kunio-kun franchise. It was also the basis for Yoshihisa Kishimoto's next game Double Dragon (1987), a spiritual successor that further advanced and popularized the beat 'em up genre format established by Nekketsu Kōha Kunio-kun, with Double Dragon itself originally intended to be a sequel before becoming a separate game.

Ocean Software produced two sequels to Renegade: Target: Renegade, and Renegade III: The Final Chapter. These were released for the ZX Spectrum, Commodore 64, Amstrad CPC and MSX, but never had corresponding arcade versions. Target: Renegade was also released on the NES. Technōs Japan had no involvement in the sequels.

Technōs Japan was slated to release the Game Boy title Nekketsu Kōha Kunio-kun: Bangai Rantō Hen as a follow-up called The Renegades, but was eventually retooled as Double Dragon II.

Future Kunio-kun games were localized in North America without the branding as Super Dodge Ball, River City Ransom and Nintendo World Cup, the latter being a collaboration with Nintendo.

=== Popular culture ===
Manga artist Mizuki Kawashita has named one of the characters in her best known manga, Ichigo 100%, Misuzu Sotomura after the game character of the same first name.
