= River City Girls 2 =

2022 video game

- Developer: WayForward
- Publishers: Arc System Works; WayForward; Crunchyroll Games (Mobile)
- Directors: Bannon Rudis; Matt Bozon
- Series: Kunio-kun
- Platforms: Nintendo Switch; PlayStation 4; PlayStation 5; Windows; Xbox One; Xbox Series X/S; Android; iOS
- Release: JP: December 1, 2022; WW: December 15, 2022; Android, iOS: 20 November 2024
- Genre: Beat 'em up
- Modes: Single-player, multiplayer

River City Girls 2 (Note: Nekketsu Kōha Kunio-kun Gaiden Ribā Shitī Gāruzu 2 (Japanese: 熱血硬派くにおくん外伝 River City Girls(リバーシティガールズ) 2) lit. Hot-blooded Tough Guy Kunio Side Story: River City Girls 2) is a 2022 beat 'em up video game developed by WayForward and co-published by them and Arc System Works. It is the sequel to the 2019 game River City Girls, itself a spin-off the Kunio-kun franchise. The game was released for the Nintendo Switch, PlayStation 4, PlayStation 5, Windows, Xbox One, and Xbox Series X/S, in December 2022. A mobile port, published by Crunchyroll Games was released on Android and iOS on November 20, 2024. The game continues the story of friends Kyoko and Misako following the events of the 2019 game as they team up with their boyfriends Kunio and Riki to defeat a new threat to their community, recruiting more fighters in the form of Marian and Provie (originally appearing in the Double Dragon series and River City Ransom: Underground respectively) along the way.

== Gameplay ==
Like its predecessor, River City Girls 2 is a beat-em-up brawler. The player can initially choose between Kyoko, Misako, Kunio or Riki, with Marian and Provie becoming available as the player progresses through the game. Double Dragon series protagonists Billy and Jimmy Lee are also playable via downloadable content.

== Reception ==
Reception

Aggregate score
Aggregator	Score
Metacritic	NS: 78/100; PS5: 75/100; PC: 81/100

Review score
Publication	Score
IGN	8/10

According to review aggregator website Metacritic, River City Girls 2 received "generally favourable reviews" for all versions. The Nintendo Switch version received a score of 78 out of 100, the PlayStation 5 received a score of 75 out of 100, and the Windows version received a score of 81 out of 100.

Critics praised the animation and soundtrack. In particular the addition of new playable characters and new areas was well-received. Some criticisms reflected the lack of a mini-map and a largely similar experience to the previous game.

IGN Jarret Green reviewed the game positively, giving the game a 8/10. Green praised the art direction, dense combat and sense of humour, but noted that he had to "spend an awful lot of time backtracking through parts of the city to check boxes to progress the main story", but that the areas "deserves to stand shoulder to shoulder with beautiful retro contemporaries like Streets of Rage 4 and TMNT: Shredder's Revenge". He also noted that the combat took some time to gain complexity, referring to the early game as "particularly shallow" but "once you get further down the combo rabbit hole the offensive options feel spectacular."
