= Nintendo World Cup =

1990 video game

- North American cover art
- Developers: Technōs Japan; SPS (X68000); Aspect (MD)
- Publishers: JP: Technōs Japan; NA/EU: Nintendo; JP: Sharp Corporation (X68000); JP: Naxat Soft (PC Engine); JP: Palsoft (MD)
- Designers: Noriyuki Tomiyama; Hiroyuki Sekimoto; Mitsuhiro Yoshida
- Composer: Kazuo Sawa
- Platforms: Nintendo Entertainment System, Game Boy, Game Boy Advance, Mega Drive, PC Engine, Super CD-ROM², X68000
- Release: NES: JP: May 18, 1990; NA: December 1990; EU: June 27, 1991; X68000: JP: 1990; Game Boy: JP: April 24, 1991; NA: June 1991; EU: 1991; Super CD-ROM²: JP: December 20, 1991; PC Engine: JP: April 13, 1992; Mega Drive: JP: August 7, 1992
- Genre: Sports
- Modes: Single-player, multiplayer

Nintendo World Cup, released in Japan as Nekketsu High School Dodgeball Club: Soccer Story (Note: Japanese: 熱血高校ドッジボール部サッカー編, Hepburn: Nekketsu Kōkō Dojjibōru Bu: Sakkā Hen; lit. Hot Blooded High School Dodge Ball Club: Soccer Edition), is a 1990 soccer video game developed by Technōs Japan for the Nintendo Entertainment System. It was localized and released outside Japan by Nintendo, with a Game Boy port also being released. It is the fourth installment of the Kunio-kun series. Ports for the PC Engine and Mega Drive were also released in Japan.

== Plot ==
=== Nekketsu High School Dodgeball Club: Soccer Story ===
Eight students known as Atsushi, Genei, Hiroshi, Kunio, Masa, Masahiro, Susumu and Takashi compete in a soccer tournament against 13 other high schools.

=== Nintendo World Cup ===
Thirteen national teams compete in a world cup to become number one. At the time of release, the German team represented West Germany. The East German team reunified with West Germany later on in 1990.

- Argentina
- Brazil
- Cameroon
- England
- France
- West Germany
- Italy
- Japan
- Mexico
- Netherlands
- Soviet Union
- Spain
- United States

== Gameplay ==
Gameplay of Nintendo World Cup. The player-controlled U.S.A. team competes against Japan, led by Kunio.

At its core, the game follows the rules of soccer, but with some noticeable differences. Each team has only six players (a goalkeeper, two defenders, a midfielder and two forwards). The players control only one of them, but can give orders (Pass/Shoot) to the others. Offsides is not present and fouls are not punished. Players can be knocked out by repeatedly tackling them. They will then stay down for the rest of the half. Players can also use up to five "super shots" per half. These powerful shots are used whenever a player does a bicycle kick or most of the time when doing a diving header, or when shooting after walking a certain number of steps. The "super shots" differ from team to team. The playing fields also differ in respect to material, e.g. ice, which heavily impacts movement of players and the ball.

There are two game modes:

- Tournament mode: one or two players select from the 13 available teams, in order to defeat their CPU-controlled opponents.
- VS Match mode: enables players to confront each other on sand, ice or dirt playing fields. On the NES version, up to four players can compete using the NES Four Score or the NES Satellite. For the Game Boy, a link cable or Four Player Adapter would be used.

Graphically, the NES version game looks similar to the Famicom version and other games in the Kunio-kun series, particularly Downtown Nekketsu Story/River City Ransom, with its short-legged, big-headed characters having varied faces. In fact, some sprites, such as Kunio and the other members of the Japanese team, were reused from that game.

== Regional differences ==
The NES version of Nekketsu High School Dodge Ball Club: Soccer Edition, Nintendo World Cup, differs from its counterpart, in that the game centers around a tournament taking place in Japan between thirteen high schools, instead of a world cup. In the main Tournament Mode, the player takes control of the main team of Nekketsu High School team and competes against the other twelve teams. The Tournament Mode's opening intro and story sequences are removed in the NES version. In the Famicom version's "Vs. Match Mode", the player can only choose between the Nekketsu team and four other teams. Since the main Tournament Mode in the Famicom version only featured a single team, the NES localization makes it possible to choose between the thirteen nationalities represented in the game by changing the palette of the player's team and their super shots. Unlike the Famicom version, the NES version supports up to four players instead of two.

== Ports ==
A port to the Game Boy was released as Nekketsu High School Soccer Club: World Cup (Note: Japanese: 熱血高校サッカー部 ワールドカップ編, Hepburn: Nekketsu Kōkō Sakkā Bu: Wārudo Kappu Hen; lit. Hot Blooded High School Soccer Club: World Cup Edition) in Japan and was based on Nintendo World Cup. It was released in North America and Europe under the same name.

The game was ported to PC Engine's Super CD-ROM² and retitled Nekketsu High School Dodgeball Club: CD Soccer (Note: Japanese: 熱血高校ドッジボール部 ＣＤサッカー編, Hepburn: Nekketsu Kōkō Dodgeball Bu: Shī Dī Sakkā Hen; lit. Hot Blooded High School Dodge Ball Club: CD Soccer Edition) and was released on December 20, 1991, published by Naxat Soft. This version includes five national teams (France, Brazil, Argentina, Italy and Germany) in Tournament mode which is unlocked after winning the final match.

A similar version for the PC Engine HuCard was released on April 13, 1992, under the title Nekketsu High School Dodgeball Club: PC Soccer. (Note: Japanese: 熱血高校ドッジボール部 ＰＣサッカー編, Hepburn: Nekketsu Kōkō Dojjibōru Bu: Pī Shī Sakkā-hen; lit. Hot Blooded High School Dodge Ball Club: PC Soccer Edition) The only differences between the two versions is that the CD version has an arranged soundtrack and added voice acting for the intro and cutscene.

A Mega Drive version of the game, titled Nekketsu High School Dodgeball Club: MD Soccer (Note: Japanese: 熱血高校ドッジボール部 ＭＤサッカー編, Hepburn: Nekketsu Kōkō Dojjibōru Bu: Mega Doraibu Sakkā-hen; lit. Hot Blooded High School Dodge Ball Club: MD Soccer Edition) was released by Palsoft in Japan on August 7, 1992. Unlike the Famicom/NES version and other platforms, this version has all the teams available in VS. Mode.

=== Re-releases ===
The Famicom version was ported to Game Boy Advance as part of the Kunio-kun Nekketsu Collection 2 (along with Downtown Nekketsu Kōshinkyoku: Soreyuke Daiundōkai), which was released on October 27, 2005, in Japan.

The original Famicom version of Nekketsu High School Dodgeball Club: Soccer Edition was re-released for Virtual Console in Japan on October 7, 2008, for the Wii and on March 19, 2014, for the Wii U. As for Nintendo World Cup, however, there are no plans for the game to be released in North America or PAL regions. The PC Engine Super CD-ROM² version was also re-released in Japan for the Wii on November 4, 2008.

Nekketsu High School Dodgeball Club - Soccer Story was released by Arc System Works as part of the compilation title DOUBLE DRAGON & Kunio-kun Retro Brawler Bundle for the Nintendo Switch and PlayStation 4 on February 20, 2020.
