= Super Dodge Ball (1988 video game) =

1988 video game

- North American cover art
- Developer: Technōs Japan
- Publishers: JP: Technōs Japan; NA: CSG Imagesoft
- Director: Mitsuhiro Yoshida
- Designer: Koji Ogata
- Composer: Kazuo Sawa
- Series: Kunio-kun
- Platform: Nintendo Entertainment System
- Release: JP: July 26, 1988; NA: June 1989
- Genre: Sports
- Modes: Single-player, multiplayer

Super Dodge Ball (Note: Originally released in Japan as Nekketsu Kōkō Dodgeball Bu (熱血高校ドッジボール部, Nekketsu Kōkō Dojjibōru Bu; lit. Hot-Blooded High School Dodgeball Club)) is a 1989 sports video game developed and published by Technōs Japan for the Nintendo Entertainment System. It is loosely based on the 1987 arcade game of the same name. Like its arcade counterpart, it was released in Japan as part of the Kunio-kun series.

In Japan, a PC port of the Famicom version of Nekketsu Kōkō Dodgeball Bu was released on October 17, 2003, as a budget-priced release. It was also included in the Game Boy Advance compilation Kunio-kun Nekketsu Collection 1, released in 2005. Both the Famicom version and the American NES version were released for the Wii, Nintendo 3DS and Wii U Virtual Console for their respective territories. The game was also released in Europe for the two latter systems, despite the NES version not being released in Europe.

== Gameplay ==
The NES version of Super Dodge Ball expands upon the basic premise of the original arcade version by giving the members of each team individual names and stats. Moreover, in addition to the single-player tournament mode and a 2-player versus mode, there's also a free-for-all "bean ball" mode where the six members of Team USA fight each other until one remains.

The objective of each match is to defeat the rival team by throwing a dodge ball at its members. Each character has a life gauge that is gradually depleted as he gets struck by dodge balls. When their life reaches zero, they will be eliminated. When a character gets hit, with a life gauge of three bars or lower, they will be placed in a "tired" state, giving the opponent a moment of advantage. Moreover, each has their own stats and two different power shots (one which is performed while running, and another that is performed during a running jump).

=== World Cup play ===
World Cup play is the game's single-player mode. The player takes control of Team USA, as they compete against eight rival teams in a dodgeball tournament with irregular rules. To win each match, the player must defeat the three infield members of the rival team, but if the three infield members of the player's team are defeated, the player will lose the match.

Like in the arcade version, the player starts off in a match against another rival American team and then proceed to face against seven international teams: England, India, Iceland, China, Kenya and Japan. The eighth match is against Team USSR. If the player loses at least one of their members during the match with USSR, the game will end after USSR is defeated. If all three infield members are still alive, an additional match set in Team USSR's home court will be held against Team Shadow, a clone of Team USA whose members will be arranged in the same positions as the player's.

The home courts of Team Iceland's and Team Kenya's are different from those of the other teams. Iceland's court is a slippery field of ice, whereas Kenya's court is a swampland that makes it hard to run.

=== Versus play ===
Versus play is the 2-player competitive mode. Both players can choose from any of the nine teams from the World Cup mode, including the same team as the other player. While both players can change the formation of their teams before each match, there's only one fixed court in this mode. The rules in each match are the same as in World Cup play.

=== Bean ball ===
Bean ball mode is a free-for-all mode that can be played by one or two players. The player can choose from one of the six members of Team USA. The members who are not chosen by the player (or players) will be controlled by the computer instead. In this mode, each member of Team USA must fight each other on a schoolyard until only one remains. Unlike the courts of the other game modes, there is no infield or outfield and all six characters can move in any place they want.

The background of the schoolyard changes depending on the difficulty setting: on Easy, it is set during the day; on Normal, it is evening; and on Difficult, it is nighttime.

== Teams ==
Team USA
The team controlled by the player in World Cup play, as well as bean ball mode. Led by Sam Powers, the other members include John Stone, Mike Knopfler, Randy Sting, Bill Flash, and Steve Sato.
Team Pro All-Stars
The other American team is led by Jack, who is its most powerful member and holds the ball most of the time. Although their physical strength are low, they have good defense and can intercept many shots. Their speciality however, is Ball Breaking, making David (Type E) player in their group have the highest control of the ball in the game. Jack will use his 'Upper' Shot. Their stage is set atop a building with the Statue of Liberty on the background.
Team England
Led by James, the team has a shooting technique as their speciality, making Henry (Type F) of their team have the best shooting technique out of everyone. Although they have high stamina, they become weak when stricken and their agility is not very high either. James uses his aerial Power shot, 'The Tsunami'. Their stage is set near the banks of River Thames with Tower Bridge on the background. Their theme music is loosely and mostly based on the song "Get Back" by the Beatles, with references to "I Want To Hold Your Hand" and "A Hard Day's Night".
Team India
Led by Rajiv, it is a team with low stamina, but unusually high agility and ball breaking skills. Their speciality is their high resistance. They have no firm strategy and while they pass the ball to outfield members often, it is easier to steal their passes compared to other teams such as China. Due to their defensive speciality, Swami (type B) of their group is the most-resilient character in the game by DEFAULT as a super shot only causes him to lose 2 points of health. Rajiv uses the 'Stinger' most of the time. Their stage is set in front of Taj Mahal.
Team Iceland
Led by Helgi, they have high ball power and good resistance, but their speed is slow. Their speciality is Energy, and Helgi himself has the highest energy levels in the game at 64. They are a team that relies on individual power play. They rarely pass the ball to each other or crouch to avoid shots. Helgi uses his Ground 'Warp' Shot. Their stage is a field of ice with nobody but penguins on the background.
Team China
A team with low defense, but they have great agility. Their speciality is their high catching technique, making Li (Type C) of their group have the best catching technique. They attempt to distract the players by making good use of jumping passes to outfield teammates, as well as Captain Wang's power shot "The Breaker". They are one of the teams that steals the players ball while passing. Their stage is set on Tiananmen Square.
Team Kenya
Led by Yemi, they are a surprisingly well-rounded team with good offense and decent defense, but their speciality is Agility, making Mwai (Type D) of their group the fastest player in the game. Their offensive and defensive strategies consist of using many dashes and jumps. They always shoot immediately when they possess the ball and rarely pass it to each other, and they'll try to steal the ball if the player is passing it to an outfield teammate. Their leader Yemi uses the Boomerang Shot. Their stage is set on an outdoor swampland at sunset.
Team Japan
A team mostly relying on the leader, their speciality is ball power, making their Captain Fuji the strongest player in the game. Fuji always collects the ball and constantly does his aerial shot 'The Shrike Drop Shot'. Fuji is placed on the end row of the defensive side, but its leadership falls apart when Fuji is eliminated. Their stage has Mount Fuji and a few cherry blossom trees on the background. Their theme music is based on "Sakura Sakura".
Team USSR
An all-around team with a balance in offense and defense, it is led by Boris, who likes doing his aerial power shot, 'The Accelerator'. Their stage is set in front of Red Square. Their theme music is based on "Katyusha".
Team Shadow
A clone of Team USA, although their stripes are colored white-and-grey. They appear in the game after the match with Team USSR if the player wins the match with all of its members. Although they have the same formation and physical strength as the player's team during their match with USSR, the rest of their abilities are greater. The player's position cannot be changed before the match with Team Shadow. Their playing pattern is based on any of the eight previous CPU teams.

== Regional differences ==
Like its arcade counterpart, the nationalities of the Japanese and American teams were switched between the two versions of the game. In the Famicom version, Team USA and Team Pro All-Stars were originally Nekketsu High School and Hanazono High School respectively, both Japanese teams. Team USSR is the penultimate team in the Famicom version and whereas their captain's sprite is unchanged, their stats are identical to Team Japan in the NES version. On the other hand, Team USA is the final rival team in the Famicom version and while their captain has the same design as Team Japan's captain in the NES version, their stats are the same as Team USSR's in the NES version.

Nekketsu Kōkō Dodgeball Bu was notably the first Famicom game to allow up to four players to participate simultaneously. The two additional players can participate in Bean Ball mode by plugging another controller or a multi-controller adapter such as HAL's Joypair and Hori's Twin Adapter into the console's expansion port. Since the NES Four Score and NES Satellite were not released yet when the game was made, the NES version only allows up to two players.

When the player resets the game in the Famicom version, a voice clip of Kunio saying his catch-phrase Namen nayo! (なめんなよ!; "Don't mess with me!") will be played.
