= Xain'd Sleena =

1986 video game

- Japanese arcade flyer
- Developer: Technōs Japan
- Publishers: JP: Technōs Japan; NA: Memetron
- Platforms: Arcade, Amiga, Atari ST, Commodore 64, Amstrad CPC, MSX, ZX Spectrum
- Release: Late 1986
- Genres: Platform, Scrolling shooter
- Mode: Single-player

Xain'd Sleena (ザインドスリーナ) is a 1986 scrolling shooter platform video game developed and published by Technōs Japan for arcades. It was licensed for release outside of Japan by Taito. In the US, the game was published by Memetron under the title Solar Warrior. The European home computer ports renamed it to Soldier of Light.

== Gameplay ==
The main character, Xain, is a galactic bounty-hunter who must defeat evil forces who oppress five different planets. The player can select any order to play the various planets, so, there is no 'official' sequence of play (the U.S. version, released as Solar Warrior, goes through a set sequence instead of having the option to choose planets).

Each planet is played with right horizontal and vertical scrolling, shooting enemies and dodging natural hazards. Xain can crouch, double crouch (prone), jump and double jump. In some of the planets the player will need to kill a sub-boss to resume. Certain enemies carry a powerup which changes the default laser gun into a different weapon. The different weapons which are cycled through powerups include a laser-grenade gun, a 2-way gun, a spreadfire gun and a strong bullet gun with their own respective damage and directional firing capabilities.

At the end of the planet, the player goes into battle with a boss. Once defeated, the player plants a bomb into the boss' base and has ten seconds to escape in a starship.

The next half of the planet stage is an interlude stage during which the player must battle through waves of enemy ships while heading to the next planet. After three planets there is a battle through an asteroid field and against a giant mothership.

When all five planets are liberated, the player will play the longer final stage on a gigantic metallic fortress, facing the bosses previously met on each of the five planets. Fighting bosses in this stage is optional. Halfway through the stage the player plants a bomb on the fortress core and has 60 seconds to reach the exit hangar and jump into the starship.

== Reception ==
Reception

Review scores
Publication	Score
ACE	499 (C64)
The Games Machine	70% (ST); 77% (C64); 86% (ZX)

In Japan, Game Machine listed Xain'd Sleena on their January 15, 1987 issue as being the twelfth most-successful table arcade unit of the month.

While giving the Commodore 64 port a score of 499 points, ACE compared the game to Firebird's game Crosswize. The Games Machine gave the Atari ST, Commodore 64 and ZX Spectrum ports scores of 70%, 77% and 86% respectively.
