= Renegade III: The Final Chapter =

1989 video game

- Developer: Imagine Software
- Platforms: ZX Spectrum, Commodore 64, Amstrad CPC, MSX
- Release: 1989
- Genre: Beat 'em up
- Mode: Single-player

Renegade III: The Final Chapter is a scrolling beat'em up video game released on the Amstrad CPC, Commodore 64, MSX, and ZX Spectrum in 1989 by Ocean Software under their Imagine label. The game is a sequel to Target: Renegade which itself is a sequel to the arcade game Renegade. Unlike the first two games, Renegade III follows the character known only as "Renegade" as he travels through time to rescue his captured girlfriend. It also dropped the two-player mode found in the previous title.

An Amiga version was developed but never released. It was leaked years later.

== Reception ==
Reception

Award
| Publication | Award |
|---|---|
| Crash | Crash Smash |

Though the game was highly praised by critics, receiving high scores in several prominent gaming publications such as a 91% score being awarded by Crash, and 84% in C+VG, it was derided by fans who criticised the game's storyline, lack of deep gameplay, weapons, glitches, poor physics and lack of a two-player option.

The Spanish magazine Microhobby valued the game with the following scores: Originality: 30%; Graphics: 80%; Motion: 80%; Sound: 80%; Difficulty: 100%; Addiction: 80%.
