= The Combatribes =

1990 video game

- Arcade flyer
- Developer: Technōs Japan
- Publisher: Technōs Japan
- Directors: Atsushi Tanimoto, Noriyuki Tomiyama (arcade); Yoshihisa Kishimoto (SNES)
- Producer: Noriyuki Tomiyama
- Programmers: Naritaka Nishimura, Takayuki Saito, Isamu Kanakubo, Kenji Nishikawa (arcade); Michiya Hirasawa, S. Minayoshi (SNES)
- Artists: Koji Ogata, H. Shibata, Tsutomu Andō, Toshiyuki Ōsumi, Shinichi Saitō, Masamichi Katagiri, Takehisa Izumiyama, H. Sakamoto (arcade); A. Hirasawa, Hidetoshi Fujioka, Yasuo Wakatsuki, S. Inoue, Takashige Shichijyo, Tsutomu Andō (SNES)
- Writer: Atsushi Tanimoto (SNES)
- Composer: Kazunaka Yamane
- Platforms: Arcade, Super Nintendo Entertainment System
- Release: May 1990
- Genre: Beat 'em up
- Modes: Single-player, multiplayer

The Combatribes (Note: Japanese: ザ・コンバットライブス, Hepburn: Za Konbattoraibusu) is a 1990 beat 'em up video game developed and published by Technōs Japan for arcades. A home version of the Super Nintendo Entertainment System was also released in 1992. The game centers on three vigilantes (identified as cyborgs in the SNES port) who must fight against numerous street gangs in futuristic New York City. The SNES version was released for the Wii Virtual Console in North America on November 30, 2009.

== Gameplay ==
The player controls either Berserker, Bullova or Blitz. In addition to the standard punch and kick combos such as stomping on an enemy, the player can swing them by their ankles, kick them on the ground, slam their faces into the pavement and even the ability to slam the heads of two opponents together. The player can also pick up certain large-sized objects (parked motorcycles, go-karts or pinball machines) and toss them over enemies.

The game can be set up so that it can be played by up to two or three players simultaneously. In the two-player version of the game, the players are asked to select their characters at the character select screen, whereas the three-player version has each player already assigned a corresponding character.

The game is composed of six different stages (or "Acts" as they're referred within the game) set in unique locations, each featuring a themed gang. The majority of the stages are composed of a single playing field where the player must take on a set number of underlings before facing the gang's leader, similar to Renegade. Some stages break away from this formula by having more than one level. The gangs the player faces are in order: a biker gang in Times Square, circus performers in Coney Island, roller skaters in a dance club, a punk gang in a baseball stadium and a militia in a high-rise building.

The final stage is a boss rush against all the previous gangs while chasing a big crime boss in the harbor. After the gangs are defeated once again, the crime boss is killed by a female cyborg, Martha Splatterhead. Martha then engages the player in a final battle. If two or three players are present by the start of the final battle, an additional clone or two of Martha will appear to match the number of players. All Marthas must be defeated to complete the game.

=== Home version ===
The Super NES version of The Combatribes makes a few changes to the game. The game now features story sequences before and after boss battles, as well as an opening intro explaining the plot and a different ending. Two player moves are also missing: the ability to pick up and carry enemies around, and the ability to repeatedly kick downed opponents. Levels are also changed.

In addition to the main game, there's a one-on-one versus mode similar to the one featured in the NES version of Double Dragon. The player can perform Street Fighter II-style special techniques including fireballs and block attacks with some characters. The game's enemies and bosses can also be used by inputting passwords given in the main game.

The North American version of the game was further censored, with the blood on enemy's faces during cut scenes being recolored white to look like saliva, sweat and tears. One of the bosses, a cyborg general named Swastika, was renamed "Master Blaster", to remove obvious references to Nazism. The fifth stage gang is renamed "The Demolition Troops" (instead of "The Slaughter Troops"). In the first stage, the "Steak & Brew Burger" in the background is renamed to the "Steak & Shake", to remove alcohol references (even though the original name was likely a reference to coffee rather than beer "brew", given the adjacent sign advertising coffee in both versions).

The Virtual Console re-release in North America was furthered censored, with the enemy organization "Ground Zero" being renamed "Guilty Zero".

== Soundtrack ==
An album containing the original soundtrack for the arcade versions of Double Dragon 3: The Rosetta Stone and this game was released by Pony Canyon in Japan, titled Double Dragon 3/The Combatribes. It was released on June 21, 1991, and its catalog number is PCCB-00065. Tracks 13 to 21 are taken from The Combatribes.

== Reception ==
In Japan, Game Machine listed The Combatribes on their August 1, 1990 issue as being the second most-successful table arcade unit of the month. In the United States, it had a high-earning test market performance around May 1990. Power Unlimited gave a score of 50%, criticizing the game for its story, characters, and controls.
