= Mikuriya Station =

Mikuriya Station is the name of three train stations in Japan:

- Mikuriya Station (Nagasaki) (御厨駅)
- Mikuriya Station (Shizuoka) (御厨駅)
- Mikuriya Station (Tottori) (御来屋駅)
