= River City Ransom =

1989 video game

- North American NES box art
- Developer: Technōs Japan (Note: X68000 version developed by SPS; PC Engine Super CD-ROM² version developed by KID; Game Boy Advance version developed by Million.)
- Publishers: Technōs Japan: NES; JP: Technōs Japan; NA: American Technōs Inc.; EU: Infogrames X68000 Sharp Corporation Super CD-ROM² Naxat Soft Game Boy Advance Atlus
- Directors: Mitsuhiro Yoshida; Hiroyuki Sekimoto
- Composer: Kazuo Sawa
- Series: Kunio-kun
- Platforms: NES, X68000, PC Engine Super CD-ROM², Game Boy Advance
- Release: April 25, 1989: NES; JP: April 25, 1989; NA: January 1990; EU: 1991; DE: August 1993 X68000; JP: April 1990 Super CD-ROM²; JP: December 24, 1993 Game Boy Advance; JP: March 5, 2004; NA: May 26, 2004
- Genres: Beat 'em up, action-adventure
- Modes: Single-player, multiplayer

Downtown Nekketsu Monogatari (Note: Japanese: ダウンタウン熱血物語, Hepburn: Dauntaun Nekketsu Monogatari; lit. Downtown Hot-Blooded Story), released as River City Ransom in North America and Street Gangs in PAL regions, is a 1989 action-adventure beat 'em up video game developed and published by Technōs Japan for the Nintendo Entertainment System. It is the third installment of the Kunio-kun series released for the NES, preceded by Renegade and Super Dodge Ball, and the first to be developed specifically for the system.

Gameplay is similar to that of Renegade, but set in a non-linear open world, a first for the series. It was the first console game published by the developer's North American subsidiary American Technos.

Outside Japan, River City Ransom was not highly successful when initially released. However, it received positive reviews from critics for its innovative gameplay and humor, retaining a dedicated cult following to this day, while also making the Kunio-kun series prominent in the beat 'em up space. Remakes have been released for the X68000, PC Engine Super CD-ROM², and Game Boy Advance.

== Gameplay ==
Gameplay of River City Ransom

River City Ransom is a beat 'em up game with action role-playing elements. The game is non-linear, allowing players to explore an open world in a sandbox manner. The fighting style is similar to Double Dragon, in that the player can move freely around the screen while pressing buttons to punch, kick, or jump. The player can also use items such as brass knuckles, steel pipes, and trash cans as melee weapons or throw them at enemies.

The plot follows high school students Alex and Ryan as they cross River City in an attempt to reach River City High and rescue Ryan's girlfriend Cyndi from the clutches of a villain called "Slick". Along the way, they battle gangs of students and their gang leaders, latter of which act as bosses. In the original NES version there are nine gangs in total, with names such as "The Generic Dudes", "The Frat Guys", "The Jocks" or "The Squids". Gang members are distinguished by the color of their t-shirt; each gang has unique characteristics and attacking patterns.

The characters' effectiveness in battle is determined by their stats in combination with unlockable fighting techniques such as Grand Slam, Stone Hands, and Dragon Feet. These techniques are purchasable as books in shops throughout the city. Players can collect loot from defeated gang members, and these funds may be spent on various food items and spa treatments which serve to not only revitalize the player's stats, but may also permanently increase attributes like "Punch" and "Kick". The game has a password system for saving and loading of the player’s character stats, skills, possessions, money, and defeated bosses.

== Ports ==
=== X68000 ===
Downtown Nekketsu Monogatari was ported to the X68000, a Japanese computer platform, and released in April 1990. This version of the game, which was developed by SPS and published by Sharp.

It features several enhancements to the Famicom original, such as displaying three enemy characters on-screen instead of just two, slightly more colorful graphics, an expanded game world, and new items and special techniques for the player (including some that were only used by certain enemy characters in the Famicom version, such as the headbutt and the whirlwind kick). The new locations includes several new shops (such as a dojo) and the schools of each enemy gang, each featuring two new bosses. In addition to the player's regular stats, the player also has individual stats for all the special techniques their character has acquired. The more frequently a special move is used to finish off enemies, the stronger that particular move becomes. Unlike the Famicom version, the X68000 does not feature adjustable difficulty settings. The player can save and load their progress in one of ten save files provided by the game itself.

=== PC Engine ===
The PC Engine Super CD-ROM² version of Downtown Nekketsu Monogatari, released on December 24, 1993, was published by Naxat Soft and developed by KID, the same team that did the PC Engine versions of Nekketsu Kōkō Dodgeball (Super Dodge Ball), Double Dragon II: The Revenge, and Downtown Nekketsu Kōshinkyoku.

This version features enhanced graphics, an arranged redbook soundtrack and fully voiced characters, with the voices of Kunio and Riki performed by Ryō Horikawa and Nobutoshi Canna respectively. The player's progress is saved in this version on the PC Engine's backup memory. The rest of the game is almost identical to the Famicom version.

=== Game Boy Advance ===
North American cover of River City Ransom EX for the Game Boy Advance

A GBA version of the game, titled River City Ransom EX (Note: Japanese: ダウンタウン熱血物語ex, Hepburn: Downtown Nekketsu Monogatari ex) was released in Japan on March 5, 2004 and in North America on May 26. This remake was developed by Million and published by Atlus.

The most notable change from the original version is the loss of a true cooperative mode. Instead, the game can be played with an AI-controlled partner, and players may exchange the data of their own characters to fight alongside each other. The GBA version also includes a vast number of configurable options that can adjust game play on the fly, such as changing AI behaviour, the number of enemies in one map area, and shop item reshuffling frequency. The password system is replaced by battery backup, which allows saving up to 12 characters. Character's appearances, keystrokes for learned techniques, even enemy characters can be customized and saved using secret shop items. A saved game does not store story progress or reputation, but it does store the player's statistics, techniques, current items and money, player's name, and customized appearances. The player can gain additional computer-controlled allies and form a "posse" who helps the player on his adventure. Some of these boss characters are from the original NES version, while others are taken from later Downtown Nekketsu games. The player can be accompanied by up to three AI-controlled partners.

=== Digital ports ===
Many years after the original NES version was released, it was digitally ported to four more Nintendo systems: the Wii, Nintendo 3DS, Wii U and Nintendo Switch.

The first digital port of River City Ransom was released on the Wii Virtual Console in Japan on October 23, 2007, in PAL regions on February 21, 2008, and in North America on April 21. The western NES titles, graphics, and storylines for the latter two releases were left intact.

Ransom was next released on the 3DS Virtual Console available through the 3DS eShop in Japan on November 28, 2012, PAL region on July 25, 2013 and North America on November 14. Like other 3DS Virtual Console games, the user is able to create a restore point in the game. It also features a two player mode via download play. Only one person needs to own a copy of the game in order to play, and restore points are disabled during two player mode.

Three years later Ransom was then made available on the Wii U Virtual Console, and another three years later, it was also released as part of the Nintendo Classics service worldwide on September 18, 2018, complete with HD graphics and the ability to create save states, like the other NES games offered.

== Reception ==
Reception

Aggregate score
Aggregator	Score
GameRankings	NES: 78% GBA: 78%

Review scores
Publication	Score
Eurogamer	NES: 8/10
Famitsu	NES: 28/40
GamesMaster	NES: 32%
GameSpot	GBA: 6.9/10
GameSpy	GBA: 4/5
IGN	NES: 9/10
Nintendo Life	NES: 8/10
Player One	NES: 93%

Award
Publication	Award
GamesRadar	7th Best NES Game of All Time (2012); 11th Best NES Game of All Time (2014)

River City Ransom initially received mixed reviews upon release. Japanese magazine Famitsu reviewed the Japanese version and gave it a generally positive review, stating that it is a fighting game which skillfully incorporates RPG elements, scoring it 28 out of 40. French magazine Player One reviewed the game under its European localised title of Street Gangs and gave it a highly positive review, concluding that it is not to be missed and scoring it 93%. UK television programme GamesMaster generally panned Street Gangs, with one reviewer saying he "would rather sit in a vat of horse manure than play this game, give it to your worst enemies", with an overall score of 32%.

Retrospective reviews have been very positive. IGN said that the fighting mechanics are exceptionally achieved, and that the RPG-esque elements give the game a depth and replayability, ultimately scoring it 9 out of 10. In 2006, Play contributing editor Eric Patterson listed the game's cover art, along with Groove on Fight, as his favorite game covers of all time. In 2008, Nintendo Life gave it 8 out of 10. EuroGamer gave it an 8 out of 10. In 2009, IGN ranked it the 15th best NES game in their Top 100 NES Games list. In 2012, GamesRadar ranked it the seventh best NES game ever made. The staff felt that it was more memorable than Ghosts 'n Goblins, Legend of Kage, and Double Dragon, and is still influential. In 2014, GamesRadar ranked it the eleventh best NES game of all time. In 2017, Paste ranked it 16th in their 100 Best NES Games list. Also in 2017, Polygon ranked it 461st in their 500 best games of all time list. In 2021, Retro Gamer included the game in their Top Ten NES Games list.

GameSpy gave the GBA version a score of 4/5, while GameSpot gave it 6.9.

== Legacy ==
In 1994, a sequel was released for the Super NES titled Shin Nekketsu Kōha: Kunio-tachi no Banka.

In 2002, an aspiring game designer, tester for Atari, and longtime fan of the game obtained the title's trademark and began work on a sequel aptly titled River City Ransom 2. The project was halted when it was announced at the Electronic Entertainment Expo in 2003 that River City Ransom EX was to be released the following year. A true sequel to the game, Downtown Nekketsu Monogatari 2 (ダウンタウン熱血物語2), was developed by Miracle Kidz for a Japanese release on WiiWare in 2011. An online PC version was due out in 2012, but was put on hold due to an announcement that the developers were freezing development to focus on making completely original games.

In 2013, the Canadian independent developer, Conatus Creative, began development on an officially licensed follow-up game, named River City Ransom: Underground, originally scheduled for Windows in August 2014. In September, Conatus Creative launched a campaign on the crowdfunding site, Kickstarter, seeking CA$180,000 in funding for the game. They successfully reached their funding goal, ending it on October 9, having collected $217,643, approximately 120% of the original goal. After years of development and negotiations with Arc System Works (which, as Technōs Japan's parent company, currently own the rights for the Kunio-kun franchise), the game was released on Steam for Windows, OS X and Linux on February 27, 2017. On December 30th, 2025 the game was delisted from Steam due to the expiration of the license agreement, leaving the game's protagonist, Provie, to be largely remembered through her appearance in WayForward's River City Girls 2.

River City: Tokyo Rumble was released for the Nintendo 3DS on August 8, 2013 in Japan, December 29, 2015 in Korea, and September 27, 2016 in the United States. River City Girls, which was being developed by WayForward, was released on PlayStation 4, Nintendo Switch, Xbox One, and PC on September 5, 2019.

The NES version was re-released for the Wii's Virtual Console in 2007, the Nintendo 3DS in 2013 and the Wii U in October 2015. It was released again with the launch of the Nintendo Classics service on September 18, 2018.

Kunio, Riki, Gouda, and the Hattori Brothers make an appearance in Super Smash Bros. Ultimate as fighting spirits.
