= Kunio Mikuriya =

Japanese diplomat

Dr Kunio Mikuriya
- 御厨 邦雄
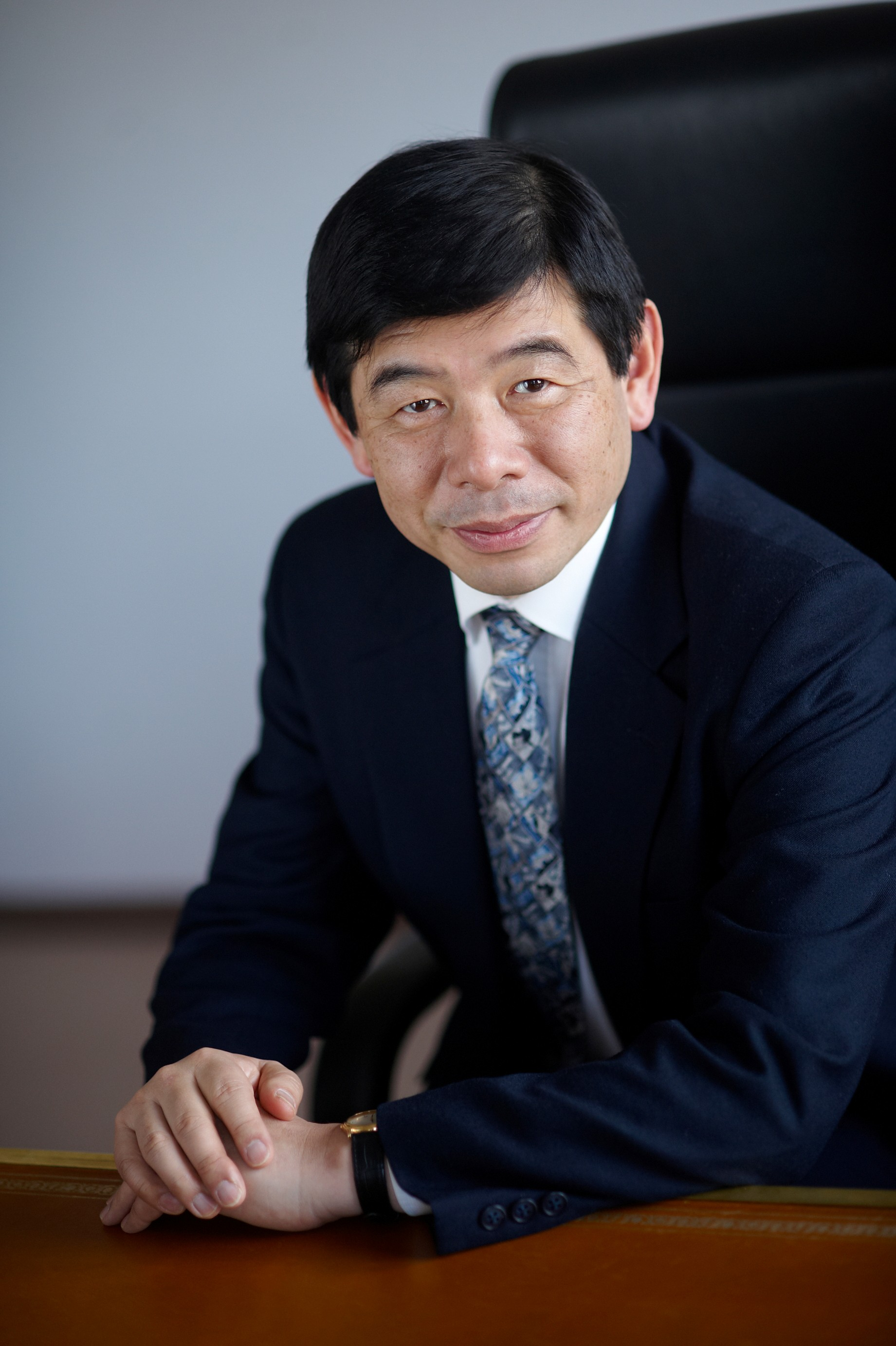
- Kunio Mikuriya, 2010

Former Secretary General of the World Customs Organization
- Incumbent
- Assumed office 1 January 2009 - 31 December 2023

Kunio Mikuriya (御厨 邦雄, Mikuriya Kunio) was the Secretary General of the World Customs Organization (WCO) from 2009 to 2023.

== Career ==
Mikuriya has a BA in law from the University of Tokyo and a PhD in international relations from the University of Kent, Brussels School of International Studies. During his career, Mikuriya has held various high-level positions in Japan's Ministry of Finance. He also had assignments as Counsellor in Japan's Mission to the WTO and a negotiator for Japan during the GATT Uruguay Round negotiations.

== WCO ==
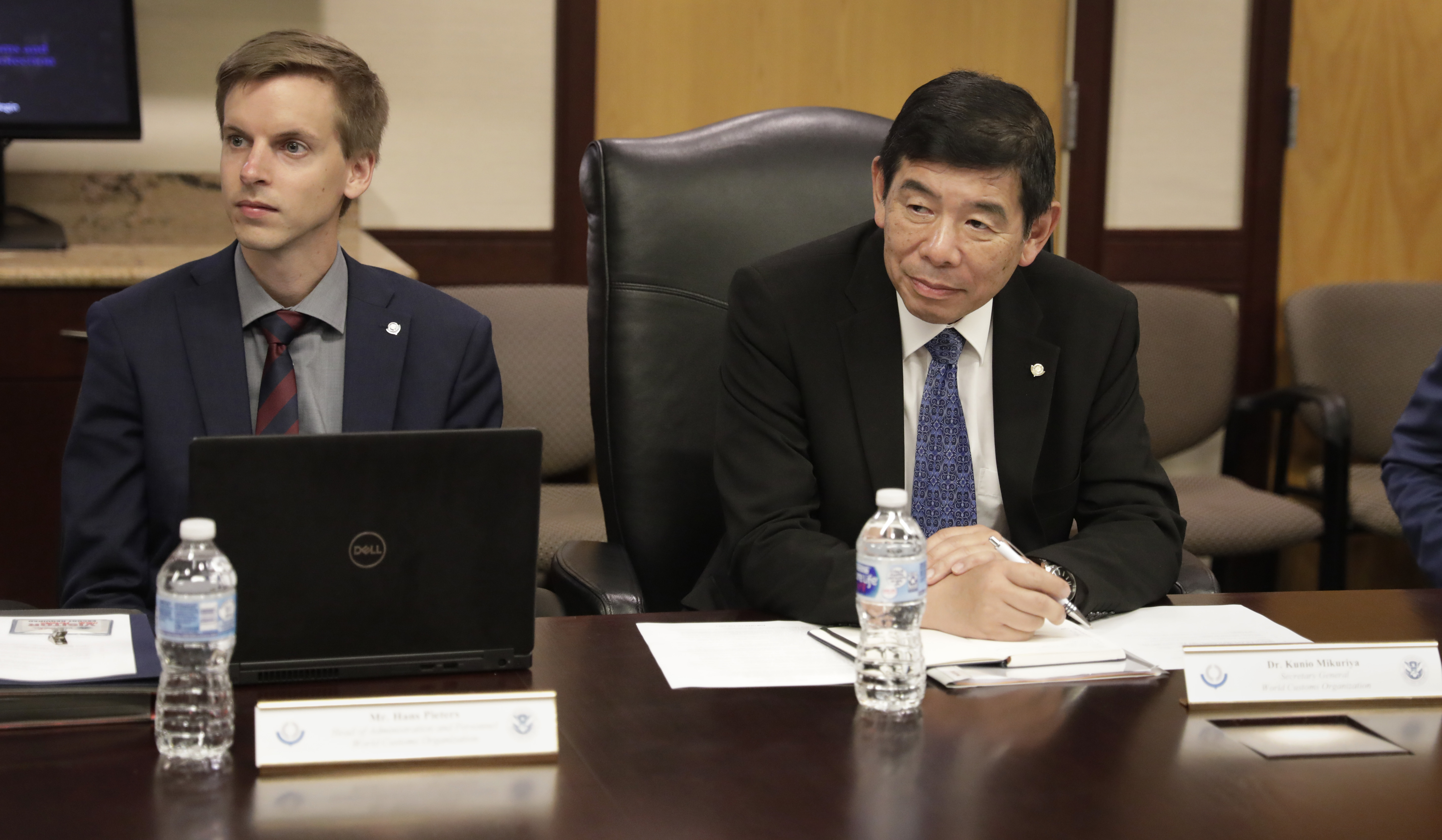
Mikuriya meets with United States customs officials in 2019

From 2002 to 2008, Mikuriya was the WCO Deputy Secretary General. On 28 June 2008, he was elected WCO Secretary General, and he took up this post on 1 January 2009. He was re-elected to a second and third five-year term in 2013 and 2018. Mikuriya has called for successful completion of the Doha Development Round, lobbied against the U.S. 100% container scanning law, and advocated enhanced trade facilitation measures during the global economic downturn.

== Publications ==
- Mikuriya, Kunio (2003), The Challenges of Facilitating the Flow of Commerce in a Heightened Security Environment, in UNECE (2003), Cosgrave-Sacks, Carol and Mario Apostolov (eds.), Trade Facilitation – The Challenges for Growth and Development.
- Mikuriya, Kunio (2004), Legal Framework for Customs Operations and Enforcement Issues, (Chapter 3 of the World Bank's Customs Modernization Handbook).
- Mikuriya, Kunio (2006), The Customs Response to the 21st Century, Global Trade and Customs Journal, Vol.1, No. 1.
- Mikuriya, Kunio (2007), Supply Chain Security: The Customs Community's Response, World Customs Journal, Vol. 1, No. 2.
- Mikuriya, Kunio (2012), Chapter 1.7 Expansion of Customs – Business Partnerships in the 21st Century in: The World Economic Forum (2012) The Global Enabling Trade Report 2012, 77-84,
- Mikuriya, Kunio (2013), Some thoughts about illicit trade, WCO news, No. 71, June 2013: 14-17,
- Mikuriya, Kunio (2013), Together, we are prepared for all eventualities, WCO news, No. 73, October 2013: 10-20,
- Mikuriya, Kunio (2014), Communication: sharing information for better communication, WCO news, No. 73, February 2014: 12-13,
- Mikuriya, Kunio (2014), Ready to implement the WTO Trade Facilitation Agreement!, WCO news, No. 74, June 2014: 10-11,
- Mikuriya, Kunio (2014), The WCO Council tackles the tough challenges facing Customs worldwide, WCO news, No. 75, October 2014: 10-11,
- Mikuriya, Kunio (2015), Coordinated Border Management – An inclusive approach for connecting stakeholders, WCO news, No. 76, February 2015: 10-11.
