= Technōs Japan =

Japanese video game developer and publisher

Technōs Japan Corp.
- Logo used from 1990 to 1995
- Native name: 株式会社テクノスジャパン
- Romanized name: Kabushiki gaisha Tekunosu Japan
- Type: Public
- Industry: Video games
- Founded: December 1981; 44 years ago
- Founders: Kunio Taki; Takashi Hanya; Takeo Hagiwara
- Defunct: 1996; 30 years ago
- Fate: Bankruptcy
- Successor: Arc System Works
- Headquarters: Nakano, Tokyo, Japan
- Key people: Kunio Taki (president); Takeo Hagiwara (senior managing director); Takashi Hanya (managing director); Noriyuki Tomiyama (general manager)

Technōs Japan Corp. was a Japanese video game developer based in Tokyo. It was best known for the Double Dragon and Kunio-kun franchises (the latter including Renegade, Super Dodge Ball and River City Ransom) as well as The Combatribes and Voltage Fighter Gowcaizer. Arc System Works owns the intellectual properties of the company.

== History ==
Initially operating from a single-room apartment, Technōs was founded in 1981 by three staff members of Data East. Their first game was Minky Monkey, released in 1982. A few months after its foundation, a lawsuit was brought up against the company by Data East under allegations that Technos had stolen data from Data East's arcade game Pro Tennis with the intent of producing and selling a bootleg of it. The two companies settled in August 1983 and Technos would go on to create the arcade games Zeroize and Tag Team Wrestling published by Data East. Technōs Japan's earlier games were published by other companies, as Technōs at the time did not have the economical resource to distribute its own games.

Nekketsu Kōha Kunio-kun ("Hot Blooded Tough Guy Kunio"), a side-scrolling beat-em-up released in 1986 about a high school student who fought thugs and delinquents from other schools, was the company's first big hit in Japan. It was designed by Yoshihisa Kishimoto. Kunio-kun was released in the west as Renegade with the game's graphics changed to make the game marketable in the overseas market. Technōs would then produce a Nintendo Entertainment System version of the game, which would be Technōs' first game for the home console market. Technōs Japan's subsequent arcade beat-em-up, Double Dragon, was a big success worldwide when it was released in 1987, leading to the production of an NES version of the game, as well as licensed versions by other companies for various platforms.

The success of Kunio-kun led to the production of numerous spin-offs and sequels starring the same character produced for the 8-bit Family Computer platform in Japan and later for the Game Boy and Super Famicom, resulting in more than twenty games starring Kunio by the mid-1990s, many of which were rule-bending sports games. A few Kunio-kun games were localized for the North American market; namely Super Dodge Ball, River City Ransom and Nintendo World Cup, but none maintain any connection with each other. Technōs would attempt to remedy this by attempting to localize several Kunio-kun under the Crash 'n the Boys label, but only Crash 'n the Boys: Street Challenge was released (the game's ending features a teaser for Ice Challenge, which was unreleased).

Technōs also released two arcade sequels to Double Dragon: Double Dragon II: The Revenge in 1988 and Double Dragon 3: The Rosetta Stone in 1990 (the latter was developed by an external development team at East Technology), and produced the respective NES versions of those games, as well as Super Double Dragon in 1992, an original installment for the Super NES. An American-produced Double Dragon animated series and a live-action film were also made as well.

Outside the Double Dragon and Kunio-kun games, Technōs produced a few original games for the arcade and home markets such as V'Ball, The Combatribes and Shadow Force, as well as two WWF arcade games (WWF Superstars and WWF Wrestlefest), but most of these games (aside from the WWF arcade games) did not achieve the same kind of success that Kunio-kun and Double Dragon achieved. The company's last games were produced for the Neo Geo hardware, which include a Double Dragon fighting game based on the movie, its second and last fighting game Voltage Fighter Gowcaizer, and a Neo Geo sequel to Super Dodge Ball. By 1996, Technōs Japan declared bankruptcy and ceased operations. Some of the developers who worked on the Neo Geo titles (including Kengo Asai) briefly worked at Face, a former affiliate of SNK.

=== Post-bankruptcy ===
Following the closure, a licensing company named Million Co., Ltd was formed to purchase the former intellectual properties of Technōs Japan. Million continued to produce new games such as Super Dodge Ball Advance, Double Dragon Advance and River City Ransom EX for the Game Boy Advance, Super Dodgeball Brawlers for the Nintendo DS, as well as reissuing older titles via the Virtual Console and other services. In June 2015, Arc System Works acquired all intellectual properties of Technōs Japan from Million Co., Ltd.

== U.S. subsidiary ==
Technōs Japan had a subsidiary in the U.S. called American Technōs Inc., which was originally located in Beaverton, Oregon (until February 28, 1991), then at Cupertino, California. American Technōs was formed in 1987, shortly after the release of Double Dragon at the arcades and published all of Technōs Japan's arcade games in North America beginning with Double Dragon II: The Revenge. While the majority of Technōs Japan's console games were still licensed to other companies such as Tradewest (Double Dragon and Super Double Dragon), Acclaim Entertainment (Double Dragon II and III), CSG Imagesoft (Super Dodge Ball) and even Nintendo (Super Spike V'Ball and Nintendo World Cup), American Technōs also managed to publish a few console games, namely River City Ransom and Crash 'n the Boys: Street Challenge for the NES, Super Double Dragon (co-published with Tradewest) and The Combatribes for the Super NES, and Geom Cube for the PlayStation. American Technōs also published Super Bowling (developed by Athena) and Super Pinball: Behind the Mask (developed by Meldac/KAZe) for the Super NES and the helicopter game Strike Point for the PlayStation. American Technōs was still operating after Technōs Japan's demise until sometime during the late 1990s. Its former president was Keiichi Iwamoto.

== List of games by platforms ==
All games are listed by original Japanese titles unless otherwise noted. Neo Geo games are listed separately from the other arcade games. This list does not take account licensed versions that were released by other companies (such as the Master System port of Double Dragon and the PC Engine ports of the Kunio games published by Naxat Soft) or games that were produced by Million, the subsequent copyrights holder of Technōs Japan's former properties. Also, all of the following games are listed by their original Japanese release date.

=== Arcade ===
- Minky Monkey: 1982
- Zeroize: 1983
- Eggs (Japanese: Scrambled Egg): 9/1983
- Dommy: 1983
- Tag Team Wrestling (Japanese: The Big Pro-Wrestling!): 12/1983
- Shusse Ōzumō: 1984
- Mysterious Stones: 11/1984
- Acrobatic Dog-Fight (Japanese: Dog-Fight: Batten O'Hara no Sucharaka Kuuchuu-sen): 1984
- Bogey Manor: 1985
- Mat Mania (Japanese: Exciting Hour): 1985
- Mania Challenge: 1986
- Battle Lane Vol. 5: 1986
- Renegade (Japanese: Nekketsu Kōha Kunio-kun): 5/1986
- Xain'd Sleena (American title: Solar Warrior; European title: Soldier of Light): 11/1986
- Double Dragon: 6/1987
- Super Dodge Ball (Japanese: Nekketsu KōKō Dodgeball Bu): 11/1987
- China Gate (Japanese: Sai Yu Gou Ma Roku): 3/1988
- Double Dragon II: The Revenge: 6/1988
- V'Ball: 12/1988
- WWF Superstars: 7/1989
- Block Out: 10/1989
- The Combatribes: 6/1990
- Double Dragon 3: The Rosetta Stone (developed by East Technology): 11/1990
- WWF Wrestlefest: 7/1991
- Shadow Force: 6/1993

=== Family Computer/Nintendo Entertainment System ===
- Renegade (Japanese: Nekketsu Kōha Kunio-kun): 4/17/1987
- Double Dragon: 4/8/1988
- Super Dodge Ball (Japanese: Nekketsu KōKō Dodgeball Bu): 7/26/1988
- River City Ransom (Japanese: Downtown Nekketsu Monogatari; PAL version: Street Gangs): 4/25/1989
- Super Spike V'Ball: 11/10/1989
- Double Dragon II: The Revenge: 12/22/1989
- Nintendo World Cup (Japanese: Nekketsu KōKō Dodgeball Bu Soccer Hen): 5/18/1990
- Downtown Nekketsu Kōshinkyoku Soreyuku Daiundōkai: 10/12/1990
- Double Dragon III: The Sacred Stones (Japanese: Double Dragon III: The Rosetta Stone): 2/22/1991
- Sugoro Quest: 6/28/1991
- Downtown Special: Kunio-kun no Jidaigeki dayo Zen'in Shūgō: 7/26/1991
- Ike Ike! Nekketsu Hockey Bu: Subette Koronde Dairantō (announced in the U.S. as Crash 'n the Boys: Ice Challenge, but was unreleased): 2/7/1992
- Crash 'n the Boys: Street Challenge (Japanese: Bikkuri Nekketsu Shinkiroku: Harukanaru Kin Medal): 6/26/1992
- Nekketsu Kakutō Densetsu: 12/23/1992
- Kunio-kun no Nekketsu Soccer League: 4/23/1993
- Nekketsu Street Basket: Ganbare Dunk Heroes: 12/17/1993
- Block Out : Unreleased
- Nekketsu Kunio-Kun Zukan: Unreleased
- Nekketsu Yakyuu Kozou: Unreleased
- Xain'd Sleena: Unreleased
- China Gate: Unreleased
- Double Dragon IV: Renegade: Unreleased

=== Game Boy ===
- Double Dragon: 7/20/1990
- Double Dragon II (Japanese: Nekketsu Kōha Kunio-kun: Bangai Rantō Hen) 12/7/1990
- Nintendo World Cup (Japanese: Nekketsu Kōkō Soccer Bu: World Cup Hen): 4/26/1991
- Nekketsu Kōkō Dodgeball Bu: Kyōteki! Dodge Soldier no Maki (Game Boy version of Super Dodge Ball released only in Japan): 11/8/1991
- Downtown Nekketsu Kōshinkyoku: Dokodemo Daiundōkai: 7/24/1992
- Bikkuri Nekketsu Shinkiroku: Dokodemo Kin Medal: 7/16/1993
- Downtown Special: Kunio-kun no Jidaigeki dayo Zen'in Shūgō: 12/22/1993
- Taiyō no Tenshi Marlowe: Ohana Batake no Dai Panic!: 5/27/1994
- Nekketsu! Beach Volley dayo: Kunio-kun: 7/29/1994

=== Super NES/Super Famicom ===
- Shodai Nekketsu Kōha Kunio-kun: 8/7/1992
- Super Double Dragon (Japanese: Return of Double Dragon): 10/16/1992
- The Combatribes: 12/23/1992
- Kunio-kun no Dodgeball dayo Zen'in Shūgō: 8/6/1993
- Downtown Nekketsu Baseball Challenge: 12/17/1993
- Shin Nekketsu Kōha: Kunio-tachi no Banka (developed by Almanic): 4/29/1994
- Kunio no Oden: 5/27/1994
- Popeye: Ijiwaru Majo Sea Hag no Maki: 8/12/1994
- Funaki Masakatsu no Hybrid Wrestler: Tōgi Denshō: 10/21/1994
- Sugoro Quest ++: Dicenics: 12/9/1994
- Dun Quest: Mashin Fūin no Densetsu: 7/21/1995
- Kunio no Bike Racing: Nekketsu Bari Bari Kouttotai: Unreleased

=== Game Gear ===
- Popeye: Beach Volleyball: 8/12/1994

=== PlayStation ===
- Geom Cube (3D puzzle game similar to Blockout): 12/22/1994

=== Neo Geo ===
- Double Dragon: 2/1995
- Voltage Fighter Gowcaizer (Japanese: Chōjin Gakuen Gowcaizer): 9/1995
- Super Dodge Ball (Japanese: Kunio no Nekketsu Dodgeball Densetsu): 1996
- High Voltage 12+1: Unreleased
- Death Match: Unreleased
- DarkSeed/Dragon's Heaven (co-developed with Face): Unreleased
