= Double Dragon (video game) =

1987 video game

- North American arcade flyer
- Developer: Technōs Japan (Note: Master System version developed by Sega and Arc System Works; Amiga, Amstrad CPC, Atari ST, Commodore 64 and ZX Spectrum versions developed by Binary Designs; IBM PC version developed by Arcadia Software; Mega Drive/Genesis version developed by Software Creations; Lynx version developed by Knight Technologies.)
- Publishers: JP: Technōs Japan; NA: Taito; NES; JP: Technōs Japan; NA: Tradewest; EU: Nintendo; IBM PC; Mastertronic; Tradewest; Master System; Sega; 2600, 7800; Activision; Game Boy; Tradewest; Mega Drive/Genesis; Ballistic; Lynx; Telegames
- Directors: Yoshihisa Kishimoto; Shinichi Saito
- Producer: Yoshihisa Kishimoto
- Designers: Koji Kai; Shinichi Saito
- Programmers: Hiroshi Satoh; Tomoyasu Koga; Nari Nishimura; Hideki Kaneda
- Artists: Kumiko Mukai; Mizuho Yama; Akemi Tasaki; Misae Nakaya; Masato Shiroto
- Composer: Kazunaka Yamane
- Series: Double Dragon
- Platform: Arcade: NES, Master System, ZX Spectrum, Amstrad CPC, Commodore 64, IBM PC, Atari ST, Amiga, Atari 2600, Atari 7800, Game Boy, Genesis/Mega Drive, Atari Lynx, Zeebo
- Release: April 22, 1987: Arcade; JP: April 22, 1987; NA: April 1987; EU: June 1987 NES; JP: April 8, 1988; NA: June 1988; EU: 1990 Master System; JP: October 1, 1988; NA: November 1988; EU: 1988 C64, IBM PC; December 1988 Amiga, Atari ST; April 1989 7800; November 1989 2600; 1989 Game Boy; JP: July 20, 1990; NA: August 1990 Mega Drive/Genesis; NA: February 1992; EU: May 6, 1992 Lynx; NA: 1993; EU: 1993
- Genre: Beat 'em up
- Modes: Single-player, multiplayer

Double Dragon (Note: Japanese: 双截龍(ダブルドラゴン), Hepburn: Daburu Doragon) (Note: The kanji characters shown on the title screen are 双截龍, literally "Twin (Measure-word) Dragons". The characters on the title screen are as follows: shuang (double), jie (measure word for dragons, compare "sheet" for "a sheet of paper" or "loaf", "a loaf of bread"), long (dragon). This is an example of gikun, in which characters are used to represent a meaning or ideal and not for phonetic value.) is a 1987 beat 'em up video game developed by Technōs Japan and published by Taito for arcades. The game's development was led by Yoshihisa Kishimoto, and it is a spiritual and technological successor to Technos' earlier beat 'em up, Nekketsu Kōha Kunio-kun (1986), released outside of Japan by Taito as Renegade; Kishimoto originally envisioned it as a direct sequel and part of the Kunio-kun series, before making it a new game with a different cast and setting.

Double Dragon introduced several additions to the Kunio-kun belt scroll beat 'em up formula, such as a continuous side-scrolling world adding a sense of progression, two-player cooperative gameplay, the ability to arm oneself with an enemy's weapon after disarming them, and the use of cutscenes to give it a cinematic look and feel. The game's title is a reference to the two-player gameplay and Bruce Lee's martial arts film Enter the Dragon (1973), which was a major inspiration behind Kunio-kun and Double Dragon, while the game's art style and setting were influenced by the Mad Max films and the Fist of the North Star manga and anime series.

Double Dragon was one of the first successful beat 'em up games, becoming Japan's third highest-grossing table arcade game of 1987 before becoming America's highest-grossing dedicated arcade game in 1988 and 1989. It also received critical acclaim, with Electronic Gaming Monthly awarding it Game of the Year in 1988. Its success resulted in the creation of the Double Dragon franchise, including two arcade sequels and several spinoffs. It also ushered in a "golden age" for the beat 'em up genre, establishing the conventions for a wave of similar games from other companies during the late 1980s and 1990s. Home versions were released for the NES, Master System, Atari 2600, Atari 7800, Atari ST, Amiga, Amstrad CPC, Commodore 64, Game Boy, Sega Genesis, and Atari Lynx, among other platforms during the series' height of popularity. A remake titled Double Dragon Advance was released for the Game Boy Advance in 2003 and a reboot, sequel Double Dragons in 2026.

== Gameplay ==
Billy and Jimmy face off against Jack, the boss at the end of the first stage (arcade).

The game is displayed in a belt scroll format, like Kunio-kun. In contrast to the arena-like levels in Kunio-kun, Double Dragon takes place in a continuously side-scrolling world.

The player takes control of martial artist Billy Lee, or his twin brother Jimmy (also known as Hammer and Spike in the supplementary materials for the American arcade release), as they fight their way into the turf of the Black Warriors gang in order to rescue Billy's girlfriend, Marian. The player character has a repertoire of martial arts techniques which they can perform by using the joystick and three action buttons (kick, jump, and punch) individually or in combination. Techniques range from basic punches and kicks to more elaborate attacks such as throws and elbow strikes. When playing with another player, one can grab an opponent from behind, allowing the other to attack unimpeded; some enemies are able to do the same thing to the players. The player begins the game with a certain number of extra lives and a life gauge which depletes as the player takes hits, and must complete each stage within a time limit. One life is lost if either the life gauge or timer reaches zero, or if the player character falls off the bottom of the screen or into a hole, river, or bed of spikes.

Certain enemies carry melee weapons, which can be knocked out of their hands and picked up to use against them. Available weapons include baseball bats, whips, throwing knives, and dynamite; in addition, rocks, oil drums, and boxes can be found in certain places.

The game is divided into four different stages or "missions", which consist of a city slum, a factory, a forest, and the gang's hideout. The first three levels takes place in a single long map, with the change in background music indicating the presence of a boss character. When a boss is defeated, the remaining underlings will retreat and the player character will enter an automatic transition sequence where he will walk into the next stage. There's also another transition sequence near the end of the third stage just as the player reaches the entrance of the gang's hideout. The fourth and final stage is set inside the hideout on a separate map as the players fight their way through numerous traps until reaching the main hall where Willy awaits. The Double Dragon title theme plays during this period. The game normally ends if Willy is defeated by a single player, but if both Lee brothers manage to complete the game together, they will be forced to fight each other in order to determine who will win Marian's affections. Both life gauges are refilled, any extra lives are taken away, and the timer is reset for this fight.

== Characters ==
The Double Dragon duo were actually unnamed when the original arcade game was initially released in Japan, they were only known by players as the Blue Dragon and the Red Dragon. Although in the overseas version, the names Hammer and Spike were given to them in the cabinet and promotional flyer produced by Taito. The names Billy and Jimmy Lee were first established in the Famicom/NES version of the first game.

- Billy Lee
  - Heir to the Chinese martial art, Sou-Setsu-Ken who is clad in blue biker clothes. Billy began learning Chinese Kenpou from his father at 12 years of age and mastered several martial arts forms during the following eight years until he turned 20, when he inherited the title of "Sou-Setsu-Ken Master" and established the Sou-Setsu-Ken Dojo with his twin brother to teach citizens how to defend themselves from the Black Warriors.
- Jimmy Lee
  - One of the Lee brothers, who is also a Sou-Setsu-Ken master who is clad in red biker clothes. He is out to crush the Black Warriors with his twin brother, Billy. However, he may have his own hidden agenda as well. Despite their differences, he is always ready to tag along with his brother whenever trouble arises; more so if it involves a good fight. In more than one occasion he has fought Billy for the affections of their mutual friend, Marian.

The Black Warriors gang consists of nine recurring members and their gang leader.

- Williams
  - A thug in a tank-top and pants. He has a nasty gut punch. He also uses weapons like baseball bats, dynamite and throwing knives.
- Roper
  - A stronger thug who wears a shirtless vest matching the color of his pants. He uses all of Williams' weapons, as well as heavy weapons such as oil drums, rocks and boxes.
- Linda
  - The sole female thug of the gang who wears a tight purple leotard. Sometimes she will appear armed with a whip and can fight hand-to-hand.
- Zack Abobo
  - A bald, mustached sub-boss who is a lighter skin-complexion than his brother. He is a strongman who has the ability to toss his opponent in the air. He also likes to throw heavy objects like oil drums and rocks.
- Jack Abobo
  - A bearded, mohawked first boss who is a darker skin-complexion than his brother. He serves as end-boss of Mission 1 and is slightly stronger than Zack.
- Jeff
  - This martial-artist is a head swap of the Lee twins who first appears as the end-boss of the second stage and later appears as a recurring underling in the final two stages.
- Mibobo (abbreviation for Midori no Abobo or "Green Abobo")
  - A green-skinned palette-swap of Jack in white pants. He appears guarding the gates to the Black Warriors hideout at the end of Mission 3. Possessing all the moves of Jack, Mibobo also walks and attacks very fast, making him a much tougher opponent.

- Willy Mackey
  - The gang's leader and final boss of the game. He is armed with a machine gun that is capable dealing great damage to the player. Willy is the leader of the Black Warriors, known by his subordinates as "Big Boss" Willy while everyone else knows him as "Machine Gun" Willy, he originally started a biker gang known as the "Killers" until it grew in members after the nuclear war and became the dominant criminal organization in New York City by being under the anonymous Shadow Boss.
- Chin Taimei
  - He was first introduced in the series as a Nintendo exclusive Stage 2 boss, basically being a replacement for Jeff in the NES/Famicom port. Chin was a skilled Kung Fu practitioner and master of the Koh-oh Ken style who hailed from China. At some point, he joined the Black Warriors criminal organization merely as a way to fight strong opponents and improve his skills. Chin and Jeff would both later join forces in the arcade release of Double Dragon II: The Revenge.

== Development ==
The game's development was led by Yoshihisa Kishimoto, who had previously created the 1986 arcade beat 'em up Nekketsu Kōha Kunio-kun, which was a semi-autobiographical game based on his own high school years and was localized as Renegade in the West. Following its release, he was asked by his seniors at Technōs Japan to create a follow-up, which they suggested should be two-player as that could earn more money in video arcades. He originally envisioned what would become Double Dragon as a Kunio-kun game, a direct sequel to Nekketsu Kōha Kunio-kun, before his seniors asked him to design an art style that would appeal to international audiences. This led to Kishimoto changing it to a spiritual successor with a new cast and setting, rather than a direct sequel. He came up with a new title, Double Dragon, with the "Double" referencing the two-player gameplay and the "Dragon" a homage to Bruce Lee's martial arts film Enter the Dragon (1973), which was a major inspiration behind Kunio-kun and Double Dragon. For the game's setting and art style, he replaced the high-school-themed setting of Kunio-kun with a disaster-ridden city inspired by the Mad Max films and the manga and anime series Fist of the North Star. Kishimoto also expanded the game world to make it a continuously side-scrolling world, adding a sense of progression to the game. This, along with the use of cut scenes, also gave it a cinematic look and feel.

The original arcade version displayed 384 colors on the screen, out of a 4096 (12-bit) color palette. The hardware used several 8-bit microprocessors running in parallel. Along with the multiple Hitachi HD6309 based processors, multiple processors were dedicated to sound, such as the Yamaha YM2151 FM synthesis sound chip.

== Ports ==
=== Famicom/NES ===
The first fight scene in the NES version of the game

Double Dragon was ported to the Family Computer by Technōs Japan in 1988. The game was published for the Nintendo Entertainment System in North America by Tradewest, who was given the license to produce other home versions of the game as well, and by Nintendo in Europe. The NES version of Double Dragon was released for the Wii's Virtual Console service in April 2008 in Europe and North America. It was also released in North America on December 12, 2013, for the Nintendo 3DS and the Wii U although in Europe, the former was released on December 5, while the latter was released on March 13, 2014.

The most notable difference the NES version has from the arcade game is the omission of the arcade's two players cooperative game mode in favor of alternating play. The plot was altered as a result of this change—instead of having both Lee brothers as protagonists, the NES version has players controlling Billy Lee as the lone protagonist, with Jimmy Lee serving as the antagonist and true leader of the Black Warriors.

Due to technical limitations of the NES that were not worked around, the game can only generate up to two enemies on-screen to confront the player and always as identical pairs. Additionally, any weapon on-screen (including the one carried by the player) will disappear when a wave of enemies has been defeated. A level-up system was also implemented. The player begins the game with only a limited repertoire of basic attacks and earns experience points by defeating enemies, gaining the ability to use more powerful techniques at specific thresholds. The player can achieve up to seven levels throughout the game.

The level designs are very different, with some stages featuring new areas (notably the cavern section in Mission 3) that feature greater emphasis on jumping over platforms or evading traps. Most of the enemies from the arcade version also appear, with the exception of Jeff and the mohawked variant of Abobo. A new enemy character, a Chinese martial arts master named Chin Taimei (shortened to Chintai in the localized version) serves as the boss of the second stage and appears as a recurring minor enemy for the rest of the game.

==== Mode B ====
The NES version features a bonus game mode (dubbed "Mode B") where the player can choose between Billy or one of five enemy characters (Will, Rowper, Linda, Chin, and Abobo) from the main game and compete against a double of their character controlled by the computer or a second player in a one-on-one match. Matches against the computer are handicapped in favor of the computer-controlled character, while certain characters will get a chance to wield a weapon in the 2-Players matches. The mode features larger sprites different from the main game itself.

Double Dragon was only the second game that Technōs developed for the NES, and the two-player mode was reputedly omitted because of the programmers' inexperience with the hardware. This also accounts for the game's large number of bugs and glitches.

=== Master System ===
Shortly after the release of the NES version, Sega acquired the rights to develop its own port of the game for the Sega Mark III and Master System with the Master System version being co-developed by Arc System Works (who would eventually gain the rights for the franchise alongside Technōs Japan's properties). The game supports the optional FM Sound Unit sold separately for the Mark III and which is already integrated into the Japanese Master System models.

This version featured brighter colors and displaying up to three different enemies on-screen, although weapons are limited to only one per screen. The game retains the two-player co-op mode (including the final face off between both players) and has level designs that were closer to the arcade game (aside from missing ladders in some areas). This version retains the Mission 2 end-boss, a head swap of the Lee brothers (who is given the name Jeff in this version). Like the NES version, the mohawked variant of Abobo is also missing in this version, with the end-boss of Mission 1 and 3 being a palette swap of the bald version.

The Master System version allows for unlimited continues until the final stage. However, if a player performs 10 backward jump kicks at the start of the final stage, they retain their unlimited continues.

=== Game Boy ===
In 1990, Technōs Japan developed a Game Boy version of Double Dragon, which was also released in North America and Europe by Tradewest. This version features gameplay similar to the NES version, but with completely different level designs and all of the main character's moves available from the start. The enemies are the same as the NES version, but some of the characters such as Abobo and Chin were given new techniques. The main game mode is still single player, although the game ends after the fight with Willy, with Jimmy not appearing in the main game. A two-player Versus Mode is also included like in the NES version, but the only characters available to play as are the Lee brothers. This version has also been re-released on the Virtual Console for the Nintendo 3DS in 2011.

=== Home computers ===
In 1989, Activision released versions of Double Dragon for the Atari 2600 and Atari 7800. In addition, home computer versions of the game were released for the Amiga, Atari ST, Commodore 64, ZX Spectrum, Amstrad CPC, and PC compatibles. Most were developed by UK-based Binary Design aside from the PC port, which was developed by Arcadia Software.

The Commodore 64 port of Double Dragon by Binary Design was heavily criticized for its poor quality. After a previous porting attempt had been abandoned by the original programming team, their replacements were given only six weeks by Virgin Mastertronic to port the entire game, resulting in a fatally rushed port that lacked almost all of the gameplay elements of the arcade game. The game also featured a visible gap between the characters' upper and lower bodies due to a poorly coded sprite multiplexer routine; the instruction manual included an apology message from the programming team for this visual artifact.

Two different Amstrad CPC versions were produced: one was released for the CPC 6128 (128 kB RAM) based on the Amiga version, while the other was released for the CPC 464 (tape and 64 kB RAM) and was ported from the Sinclair version. In 1991, a second Commodore 64 version was released by Ocean Software unrelated to the earlier Binary Design port. It came on a special 32k bank-switched cartridge and did not support two-player mode.

=== Other platforms ===
In 1992, Accolade released a Mega Drive/Genesis port of the game in North America and Europe under the "Ballistic" publishing label. This version was released as an unlicensed third-party cartridge. Although the Mega Drive/Genesis has a smaller color palette than the arcade original, due to the more powerful 16-bit hardware it actually fixes all of the slow down problems from the original arcade game. In contrast, it had a number of deficiencies (especially in sound quality) because "Ballistic" were forced to use a small 512 Kilobyte (4 Megabit) cartridge ROM for cost reasons. This version came closest to the arcade game at the time.

An Atari Lynx version was released in 1993, developed by Knight Technologies and published by Telegames.

The arcade version of Double Dragon was re-released in 2013 alongside its two sequels in a compilation titled Double Dragon Trilogy produced by Dotemu, which was released on iOS, Android, Ouya, and Windows via Steam. It was the bery first compilation of the saga that collect the three arcade games in a single release.

=== Remakes ===
Since the early 2000s, Double Dragon has been remade seven times by various groups for a range of platforms.

- In 2003, a remake of the original arcade game titled Double Dragon Advance was released for the Game Boy Advance. This version features four additional stages interspersed between the four original stages, as a new set of moves and enemy characters, some of which are lifted or inspired by other games in the series. It was published by Atlus under license from Million Corporation, the company which held the IP to the series at the time.
- In 2004, Bandai Mobile developed a mobile remake of the game which was poorly received.
- In 2005, the mobile version was remade by Korean-based Eolith and released as Double Dragon EX.
- In 2007, a remake of Double Dragon was made for Xbox Live Arcade by Razorworks, and published by Empire Interactive. This version packages both an emulation of the original arcade game, as well as a remade version featuring redrawn high definition graphics and a remixed soundtrack. It also features support for online multiplayer. On May 17, 2007, it was number one on the Xbox Live Arcade charts. It was delisted on July 1, 2009, due to the closure of Empire Interactive.
- In 2009, a remake was developed for the short-lived Zeebo console. It was left unplayable after servers closed in 2011.
- In 2011, a remake of Double Dragon for iOS and Android devices was released. It was developed by Brizo Interactive under license from Million, in collaboration with Aksys Games, and published by Bow Mobile Corp. It employed new artwork and sprites, Bluetooth multiplayer connectivity and online score ranking.
- In 2025, a remake with 3D graphics was announced as Double Dragon Revive.
- In 2026, a reboot, and sequel concluding the series released as Double Dragons allowing players to play as enemies and characters from other Technosoft games, with enhanced moves and an arrangement of levels from prior games in the series.

== Reception ==
=== Commercial performance ===
The arcade game was a blockbuster hit. In Japan, Game Machine listed Double Dragon as the most successful table arcade cabinet of June 1987. It went on to be the third highest-grossing table arcade game of 1987 in Japan. In Europe, it was the top-grossing arcade game on the UK's Deith Leisure arcade charts in July and August 1987. In the United States, it was the biggest arcade hit since Pac-Man, becoming the highest-grossing arcade video game of 1988 and again the highest-grossing dedicated arcade game for a second year in 1989. In 1988, Taito America sold over 10,000 dedicated arcade cabinets in the United States, where the game was purchased by over 80% of arcade operators. The game went on to sell 40,000 arcade units worldwide, including 26,000 arcade units in the United States. However, Taito America's earnings were negatively impacted by pirated printed circuit board (PCB) arcade conversion kits, which led to a lawsuit that it eventually won in 1989.

The NES and Master System ports were also highly successful. Toys "R" Us reported that the NES version of Double Dragon sold out in its first two weeks on sale in the United States, becoming America's top-selling game by July 1988. The NES version sold 100,000 copies within 30 days of release in the US, where it drew controversy concerning video game violence. With demand for 1 million cartridges, it was among the most in-demand games through Christmas 1988, along with Nintendo's Super Mario Bros. 2 and Zelda II: The Adventure of Link. Double Dragon's chart-topping sales on home consoles continued with the Atari 2600 version by Activision going on to sell nearly 500,000 copies, making it one of the most popular games on the console, even as it was approaching the end of its lifespan. In the United Kingdom, Melbourne House's ZX Spectrum and Commodore 64 ports topped the software sales chart in late 1988, while Mastertronic's Amiga port topped the Amiga chart in early 1990, and Mastertronic's budget C64 release was the third top-selling C64 game in June 1991. Mastertronic's home computer ports went on to sell 289,510 units in the UK.

=== Critical response ===
Reception

Review scores
Publication	Score									
Publication	Amiga	Arcade	Atari ST	C64	Game Boy	Game Gear	Master System	NES	Sega Genesis	ZX
ACE	298		275		863					
Crash		Positive								81%
Computer and Video Games	54%	Positive	54%	54%		83%	85%	83%		56%
Electronic Gaming Monthly					7/10, 7/10, 7/10, 7/10					
Joystick					91%			75%	71%	
Sinclair User										51%
The Games Machine (UK)							81%			
Your Sinclair		Positive								8/10
Cash Box		Positive								
Commodore User		9/10		43%						
Mean Machines							70%	83%	59%	
Mega Action									82%	
MegaTech									53%	
Mega Zone						85%				
Sega Power							85%		13%	
Sega Pro							77%		72%	

Awards
Publication	Award
Electronic Gaming Monthly	Game of the Year
EGM, Empire, Game Informer, G4, GameSpot, GamingBolt, KLOV, NowGamer, Yahoo!	Best Games of All Time

The original arcade version was well-received upon release. In the August 1987 issue of Commodore User, Ferdy Hamilton gave it ratings of 9 for graphics, 7 for sound, 9 for toughness, 10 for endurance, and 9 for value, with an overall score of 9 out of 10. He noted the game's popularity, stating that it took him "about half an hour to get near it in my local arcade" and "a brief glance around West End arcades confirmed" that "Double Dragon is set to be a massive coin-op hit". He said that it "isn't an easy game to play initially" and requires "both brain and brawn", described the graphics as "superb, the handling likewise", and stated "the variety of actions, locations and enemies make this a true state of the art Beat 'Em Up, centuries beyond those old Kung Fu games which still litter the arcades". He concluded it to be "a strong contender for hottest beat 'em up yet". In the July 1987 issue of Computer and Video Games, Clare Edgeley described the "sordid street fights" as "great fun when you've got the guts" and "if you manage to get hang of the controls". She concluded that "all the ingredients are there for a really addictive, martial arts style kick 'em to bits".

In the October 1987 issue of Crash, the reviewer Tony described it as "the best game of its kind around" and "thoroughly addictive". In the November 1987 issue of Your Sinclair, reviewer Peter Shaw stated that if "you liked Taito's Renegade, you'll jest lurve Double Dragon", describing it as "a streetfighting beat 'em up, but much nastier", with sprites "much bigger than the ones in Renegade, which adds to the realism", and "gruesome sound effects", concluding that it is "great stuff, and really good value, even for 30p a throw".

The critical reception of the home versions varied depending on the version's quality. The Master System port was well received, with positive reviews from Computer and Video Games, The Games Machine, and Mean Machines Sega. The NES version was also well received, including a positive review from Computer and Video Games.

The home computer versions received mixed reviews. Computer Gaming World noted the limitations of a joystick caused the IBM and C64 ports to use fewer moves than the arcade, the C64 port, in particular, being "a pale shadow of the original". Compute! wrote that the Commodore 64 version added a two-player mode, but lacked some arcade features such as moving objects, climbing most ladders, and detailed animation. The Mega Drive/Genesis version also received mixed reviews; Mega placed the game at number ten on its list of the "10 Worst Mega Drive Games of All Time".

=== Accolades ===
Electronic Gaming Monthly awarded it Game of the Year for 1988.

Double Dragon has been listed among the best video games of all time, by publications such as Electronic Gaming Monthly, Empire, and Game Informer, as well as sites such as G4, GameSpot, GamingBolt, Killer List of Videogames, NowGamer, and Yahoo! Spanner of Retro Gamer magazine named it his favorite game of all time.

== Legacy ==
Double Dragon ushered in a "Golden Age" for the beat 'em up genre that took it to new heights with its detailed set of martial arts attacks and its two-player cooperative gameplay. Double Dragon's success resulted in a flood of beat 'em ups in the late 1980s. Subsequent beat 'em ups during the late 1980s to 1990s followed the conventions set by Double Dragon.

=== Sequels ===
Double Dragon was followed by two arcade sequels: Double Dragon II: The Revenge in 1988 and Double Dragon 3: The Rosetta Stone in 1990. Both games were also followed by various home versions. Technōs produced the fourth game in the series titled Super Double Dragon, released for the Super Nintendo Entertainment System in 1992. In 1993, a crossover, titled Battletoads & Double Dragon and featuring characters from both franchises, was released for various platforms. Also in 1993, a Game Gear game by Virgin Games was released titled Double Dragon: The Revenge of Billy Lee. Billy and Jimmy also appeared in the 1990 NES game Super Spike V'Ball. The characters of Randy and Andy in the 1989 NES game River City Ransom are based on Billy and Jimmy; in Japan, they are known as Ryūichi and Ryūji and they appear in later Kunio-kun games as well.

Another game developed by WayForward Technologies, Double Dragon Neon, was released in 2012 for Xbox Live Arcade and PlayStation Network.

=== Related media ===
Double Dragon also spawned a series of related media in the United States, which includes a six-issue comic published by Marvel in 1991, an animated TV series which ran for two seasons from 1993 to 1995, which influenced a live-action film in 1994. In turn, the animated series and movie inspired their respective video game spin-offs as well, both which were fighting games. The cartoon inspired the Tradewest-developed Double Dragon V: The Shadow Falls, released in 1994 for the SNES and Genesis (also ported to the Atari Jaguar), while characters and plot elements from the film were adapted into the 1995 Technōs-developed the Neo-Geo version of Double Dragon.

Double Dragon is one of the video games featured in the manga titled Rock'n Game Boy, by Shigeto Ikehara and Published by Comic BomBom October 1989 to December 1991.

Not specific to any format/system, the original game was used as a clue in the 2015 episode of Jeopardy! in the category "The Marian Kind" in the first round on February 17.

=== Spin-offs ===
The boss Abobo is the star of an unlicensed parody game developed to homage the series, Abobo's Big Adventure.

== Soundtrack ==
A soundtrack titled Original Sound of Double Dragon (オリジナル・サウンド・オブ・ダブルドラゴン, Orijinaru Saundo obu Daburu Doragon) was released in Japan by Apollon and composed by Kazunaka Yamane, on February 21, 1988. The soundtrack features arranged versions of the music from the original arcade version. Its catalog number is BY12-5028.

1. Opening (Double Dragon) (オープニング（双截龍）, Ōpuningu (Daburu Doragon))
2. The City Slums (The Black Warriors Arrive) (スラム街（ブラックウォリアーズ出現）, Suramu Machi (Burakku Uoriāzu Shutsugen))
3. The Industrial Area (The Great Fray) (工場地帯（大乱闘）, Kōjōchitai (Dairantō))
4. After the Battle (闘いのあとで, Tatakai no Atode)
5. Setting Off (A New Battle) (旅立ち（新たなる闘い）, Tabidachi (Aratanaru Tatakai)
6. The Woods (森林編, Shinrin Hen)
7. The Giant Abobo Appears (大男アボボ登場, Ō Otoko Abobo Tōjō)
8. The Hideout (Willy the Nemesis) (大要塞（宿敵ウィリー）, Daiyōsai (Shukuteki Uirii))
9. Ending (Reunion with Marian) (エンディング（マリアンとの再会）, Endingu (Marian to no Saikai))

== See also ==
- Final Fight
- Gekido
- Golden Axe
- Kung-Fu Master
- Streets of Rage (series)
