= Double Dragon 3: The Rosetta Stone =

1990 video game

- Japanese arcade flyer, with illustration by Kazumi Kakizaki.
- Developers: East Technology; Software Creations (Genesis); Sales Curve (Game Boy)
- Publishers: Technōs Japan; Acclaim Entertainment (Game Boy/Genesis) (Note: Released under the Flying Edge brand on the Genesis)
- Designers: K. Ichikawa; T. Irisawa; T. Chida; J. Hasepin; H. Nagoshi; U. Hoshino
- Programmers: N. Takioka; E. Ogura; Y. Katsumata
- Composers: Akira Inoue; Takaro Nozaki
- Series: Double Dragon
- Platforms: Arcade, Amstrad CPC, Amiga, Atari ST, Commodore 64, ZX Spectrum, MS-DOS, Game Boy, Mega Drive/Genesis, iOS, Android
- Release: NA: May 31, 1990; JP: November 1990; EU: January 1991
- Genre: Beat 'em up
- Modes: Single-player, multiplayer

Double Dragon 3: The Rosetta Stone (Note: Japanese: ダブルドラゴン3 ザ・ロゼッタストーン, Hepburn: Daburu Doragon 3: Za Rozetta Sutōn) is a 1990 beat 'em up video game developed by East Technology and published by Technōs Japan for arcades. It is the third arcade game in the Double Dragon series and the first to not be developed by Technōs Japan.

As in the previous games of the series, players control twin martial artists Billy and Jimmy Lee, as they are approached by a mysterious fortune teller named Hiruko, who sends them on a worldwide journey to retrieve three mystical Rosetta Stones and uncover the mystery surrounding them in Egypt. Similar to The Combatribes, which ran on similar hardware, the game can be set for up to two or three players depending on the cabinet, with the third player controlling a new Lee sibling named Sonny. The U.S. version also features item shops where players could use additional credits to purchase in-game items such as weapons, additional moves and new playable characters in one of the earliest forms of microtransactions in a video game, although this system would end up being removed in the later-released Japanese version of the game in favor of a conventional character select feature similar to Golden Axe or Final Fight.

The game's arcade release was followed by home versions for the Genesis, Game Boy and various personal computers. In 2013, emulated versions of the arcade original for various platforms were officially released by DotEmu along with the previous two arcade games in a bundle called Double Dragon Trilogy.

== Gameplay ==
The arcade version showing three player characters fighting off against enemies.

Double Dragon 3 can be played by up to two or three players simultaneously, similarly to The Combatribes. The first two players control returning heroes Billy and Jimmy Lee respectively, while the third player controls a new character named Sonny (a yellow-clad palette swap of the Lee brothers). The controls consist of an eight way joystick and three buttons again, but the combat system has been greatly altered from previous games. The game discards the directional attack buttons from Double Dragon II: The Revenge, returning to the punch and kick format of the original Double Dragon. However, moves such as the elbow strike and the hair grab had been removed and new abilities replaced them. The player can now run by pushing the joystick left or right twice and perform moves with a second player such as a back-to-back hurricane kick when standing near each other and a triangle jump kick when one player jumps towards the other. Other new moves include a running head-butt, a belly-to-back throw and a jumping knee drop.

At the start of certain stages, players will have access to an item shop where they can purchase in-game power-ups by inserting more coins into the cabinet, with each item costing one credit. The item selections varies slightly between stages, but usually includes "Energy" (which restores the player's health up to 150% from the starting value), "Power Up" (which increases the player's attack speed), "Tricks" (which unlocks two additional moves, a solo hurricane kick and a jumping throw) and "Weapons" (which arms the player character with a nunchaku in Mission 2 or a sword in Mission 3 and 5).

One item, "Extra Guys", allows the player to control one of three new character types in addition to the Lee brothers (リー兄弟). These characters form other teams of fighting siblings as well, allowing each player to control a different member of the group. When the player's current fighter is killed, the new one will replace him, essentially substituting the extra lives system from previous games. These new fighters consists of the Urquidez brothers (ユキーデ兄弟) (mixed martial arts champions), the Chin brothers (陳兄弟) (tai chi experts) and the Ōyama brothers (大山兄弟) (karate masters). Each player can hold up to three extra fighters in reserve and can temporarily cycle between any of them for a second before the next character is automatically chosen. The availability of a fighter type varies depends on the stage (the Urquidez brothers are available in Mission 1 and 5, the Chin brothers in Mission 2 and the Ōyama brothers in Mission 3). The new character will inherit any purchased special techniques that the previous character had, but the increased attack speed must be repurchased. Additionally, unlike the Lee brothers, the other character types cannot purchase nor retrieve weapons.

The Japanese version of Double Dragon 3 was finished a bit later than the English version and features drastic changes as a result. Most notably, the item shops were removed from the game and players can instead choose which character to control at the start of the game, allowing the ability to start the game as any of three new fighter types (Urquidez, Chin and Ōyama) in addition to the Lee brothers. Players have access to their character's entire repertoire of moves, although the command input for the Hurricane Kick requires more precise timing in the Japanese version. Since weapons are no longer purchasable items, they can be found lying around on the floor in certain stages, waiting to be picked up by a player controlling a Lee brother. The game was also made easier, with enemies doing 1/3 less damage than in the overseas releases.

== Plot ==
After returning home from a two-year training mission, Billy and Jimmy Lee come across a fortune teller named Hiruko. The woman tells the Lee brothers that in order to challenge the world's strongest adversary, they must seek out the three Rosetta Stones that have been scattered around the world.

The game begins in the United States, where the Lee brothers must defeat the remnants of the Black Warriors gang from the previous games before they set off to find the stones. Afterward, the heroes must travel to China, Japan, Italy, and finally Egypt, where each of the stones are being guarded by formidable fighters unique to each country (such as the shinobi in Japan and archers in Italy) who will refuse to give them up without a fight. Once all three Rosetta Stones have been procured, the Lee brothers' journey reaches its final destination in Egypt, where they face all sorts of supernatural creatures as they enter Cleopatra's tomb to uncover the mystery surrounding the stones.

== Development ==
The game was not internally developed by Technōs Japan, who were busy working on other projects at the time such as WWF Superstars and The Combatribes. Instead a company called East Technology, whose previous work was the 1989 arcade shoot-'em-up Gigandes, was contracted to develop the third game in the series, resulting in a sequel with a drastically different gameplay and graphic style than its predecessors. The game was controversial upon its release due to the addition of item shops where players acquire power-ups by inserting real money into the cabinet, which was removed from the later Japanese release after negative feedback from playtesters.

=== Music ===
The music was composed by Akira Inoue and Takaro Nozaki, replacing original Double Dragon composer Kazunaka Yamane, who was busy composing for The Combatribes at the time (Yamane later returned for Super Double Dragon). Inoue composed the background music for the US, Italy and Egypt stages (including the boss battle themes), while Nozaki worked on the rest. The soundtrack was released on June 21, 1991, by Pony Canyon in Japan as a joint CD album that also included the soundtrack to The Combatribes. The catalog number is PCCB-00065. The first half of the album (tracks 1 to 12) covers the Double Dragon 3 portion, which include an arranged version of the title theme. The album does not feature the shop themes that were present in the export versions of the game.

The demo versions of Inoue's tracks were later uploaded on his personal YouTube and Niconico channels in 2014. They were recorded on a KORG T3 synthesizer.

== Release ==
A version for the Nintendo Entertainment System titled Double Dragon III: The Sacred Stones was released in February 1991, a few months after the Japanese arcade release. This version is not a port, but rather was actually a parallel project that was developed simultaneously with the arcade release. While the plot of the two versions are similar, the graphics, gameplay system and characters featured in the NES version are very different compared to the arcade version.

Double Dragon 3 was ported to various platforms under license from Tradewest. Versions were released for the ZX Spectrum, Amstrad CPC, Commodore 64, Amiga and Atari ST in late 1991, followed by the IBM PC and Game Boy in 1992. It was also followed by a Genesis version in 1993. These versions of the game were developed by The Sales Curve, with the exception of the Genesis version (which was handled by Software Creations). The Game Boy and Genesis versions were published by Acclaim under the title of Double Dragon 3: The Arcade Game, distinguishing them from the earlier NES release.

Double Dragon 3 was re-released in 2013 alongside the first two arcade games in a compilation titled Double Dragon Trilogy produced by DotEmu, which was released on iOS, Android and Steam platforms. It only includes the overseas version of the game.

== Reception ==
Reception

Review scores
Publication	Score		
Publication	Amiga	Arcade	ZX
Crash			70%
Computer and Video Games	81%	83%	
Sinclair User			93%
Your Sinclair			88%

The game was a hit in the United States, where weekly coin drop earnings averaged $188.25 per arcade unit during November and December 1990. In Japan, Game Machine listed Double Dragon 3: The Rosetta Stone on their January 1, 1991 issue as being the third most-successful table arcade unit of the month.

Julian Rignall, writing for Computer and Video Games, reacted positively to the arcade game's change to a more realistic art style and recommended the game to fans of the series, scoring it an 83%.

The arcade game was controversial for its use of microtransactions to buy items in the North American version. This was later removed from the Japanese version of the game.
