= Rage of the Dragons =

2002 video game

- Developers: Evoga; Noise Factory (Note: Additional work by BrezzaSoft.)
- Publishers: Playmore: JP: QUByte Interactive; NA: SNK; EU: Piko Interactive
- Director: Ángel Torres
- Designers: Eduardo de Palma; Mario Vargas
- Programmer: Hidenari Mamoto
- Artist: Bunshichirō Ōma
- Composer: Toshikazu Tanaka
- Platforms: Arcade, Neo Geo AES, PlayStation 4, PlayStation 5, Xbox One, Xbox Series X/S, Nintendo Switch, Microsoft Windows
- Release: Arcade: JP: June 6, 2002; (Neo Geo MVS): JP: 2024; (W); Home releases: NA/JP: September 20, 2002; (Neo Geo AES): WW: November 14, 2024; (NEO)
- Genre: Fighting
- Modes: Single-player, multiplayer
- Arcade system: Neo Geo MVS (2002); ExA-Arcadia (W)

Rage of the Dragons (Note: Japanese: レイジ・オブ・ザ・ドラゴンズ, Hepburn: Reiji obu za Doragonzu) is a 2002 fighting video game developed by Mexican studio Evoga and Noise Factory and published by Playmore for the Neo Geo arcade and home platforms. The game was developed by Japanese company Noise Factory, co-developed by BrezzaSoft and chiefly-designed by the Mexican team Evoga. Piko Interactive has acquired the publishing rights for the game in Europe in 2020. Ports for Nintendo Switch, PlayStation 4 and PlayStation 5, Microsoft Windows, and Xbox One and Xbox Series were released on November 14, 2024, ported by QUByte Interactive. An arcade version of the game called Rage of the Dragons W by exA-Arcadia is in development.

== Gameplay ==
Gameplay screenshot showcasing a match between Jimmy and Pepe

Rage of the Dragons features a tag team system, in which the player takes control of two characters and can switch between one or the other during gameplay. The character who is not being controlled will slowly recover part of his or her energy while the other is fighting. The player can perform special combos in which both characters attack an opponent at the same time for added damage. An auxiliary meter located at the bottom of the screen slowly fills up when an attack connects with an opponent. When the meter is full, special moves can be performed (Ex: Counter Attacks, Super Moves, etc.).

== Plot and characters ==
There are a total of fourteen playable fighters in Rage of the Dragons. The player can select from one of the seven default pairings, or create a custom pairing with nearly 80 possible combinations. The player will see a hidden ending if they complete the single player tournament with a Billy and Jimmy pairing.

- William "Billy" Lewis
  A famous street racer and master of Ryuzuiken. Billy hasn't seen his older brother, Jimmy, ever since the death of Jimmy's girlfriend, Mariah. Partner: Lynn
- James "Jimmy" Lewis
  After the death of his girlfriend, Mariah, Jimmy abandoned his brother and became a famous street fighter, both for the money and the thrill. He returns to Sunshine City after feeling the resonance of an evil dragon spirit. Partner: Sonia
- Lynn Baker
  Lynn is a half-Chinese half-American girl who lived her early childhood in China. Her family moved to the United States once the war in China began to escalate. She has trained with both Jimmy and Billy. Like the Lewis brothers, she is also a master of Ryuzuiken. Partner: Billy
- Sonia Romanenko
  Sonia was a highly skilled assassin. After leaving her life as an assassin behind, she meets Jimmy and falls in love with him. Partner: Jimmy
- Radel
  Radel is one of the last members of the great clan of dragon hunters. He has developed his skills to help those in need. Partner: Annie
- Annie Murakami
  Annie is a Japanese girl of Scandinavian descent. She was born into an ancient family of psychics. Early in her life, the leader of the family noticed that her psychic abilities were exceptionally powerful. He hoped that she would play an important role in the future of the family and the world. Despite her young age, she was tasked with helping Radel find and defeat Johan. Annie, as well as her black cat named Qui-zi, traveled with Radel, leaving home and her insular life for the first time. The novelty of the outside world has left her fascinated. Partner: Radel
- Cassandra Murata
  Cassandra is a woman of unknown origin who grew up in an orphanage in Japan. There she met Oni and the two became close friends. They realized that they both possess strange powers and see each other as siblings. They were forced to leave the orphanage after Oni burned it down. After leaving the orphanage they begin to travel. During their travels, Oni is compelled to fight. It is an urge he cannot ignore. During one of these fights, Oni is severely wounded, leaving Cassandra to find help for him. With Oni wounded, Cassandra seeks out Elias Patrick for help. Elias soon notices the strange energy they both possess. They agree to travel together, but their time with each other does not last. One night, Elias noticed Oni assaulting Cassandra in order to satisfy his hunger for battle. They were forced to flee, continuing on their journey by themselves once more. Partner: Oni
- Oni Inomura
  Oni is a man of unknown origin who grew up in an orphanage in Japan. He travels the world with his adopted sister Cassandra in an attempt to learn the truth behind their past. He constantly struggles with his powers and urges. Partner: Cassandra
- José "Pepe" Rodríguez
  Pepe is a Mexican fighter. After finding a scroll from the god Quetzalcoatl, his fighting abilities advance considerably. Partner: Pupa
- Pupa Salgueiro
  Pupa is a young Brazilian girl and Pepe's friend, who is searching for her missing older brother. She is trained in Capoeira and often uses a wrench when she fights. Partner: Pepe
- Alice Carroll
  Alice was born into a wealthy and prominent family in London. At the age of 10, tragedy struck her family. Her parents were brutally murdered, leaving Alice in a state of shock. When she was found, she was covered in blood and unable to tell the investigators what had happened. Some involved with the investigation into the murders suspected the young Alice of being responsible, but they could not prove it. Due to this suspicion, and her depression and erratic behavior, she was admitted to a psychiatric hospital for observation. The doctors were unable to do anything for her. Alice would remain in the hospital until she met Elias Patrick. Elias immediately recognized that Alice was possessed by an evil spirit and the doctors would not be able to help her. He became determined to help the young girl and took her under his wing. Partner: Elias
- Elias Patrick
  After the death of his family, Elias devoted his life to eradicating evil. He has studied exorcism tactics in order to eliminate any evil he finds. Partner: Alice
- Mr. Jones (Jones Damon)
  Mr. Jones is loosely based upon Jim Kelly and his character Black Belt Jones from the eponymous film. He is a self-proclaimed disco fanatic and movie star who developed his own variation of Jeet Kune Do. Partner: Kang
- Kang Jae-Mo
  While he was ridiculed for his size when he was young, Kang eventually became a famous wrestler. He has dreams of becoming an actor someday, and is good friends with Mr. Jones. Partner: Mr. Jones

There are also two boss characters in the game, who are fought by the player at the end of the single player tournament. Unlike the regular characters, these bosses only fought by themselves, having single entries.

- Abubo Rao
  A once glorious fighter and former member of the gang that ruled Sunshine City, Abubo was plotting to one day overthrow his boss until Jimmy and Billy barged into their turf and defeated them. He was personally defeated by the older brother and bore a grudge against him ever since.
- Johann
  The leader of a big underground cult in Sunshine City, Johann is also a former disciple of Lynn's grandfather and the current possessor of the Black Dragon, an evil entity destined to wreak havoc on the land.

== Development and release ==
Evoga originally envisioned Rage of the Dragons as a sequel to the Neo Geo fighting game version of Double Dragon released in 1995, but Evoga was unable to use the intellectual rights for the characters (that were purchased by Million, a company founded by former Technōs Japan staff which developed Double Dragon Advance), and thus Rage of the Dragons was turned into a homage to the Double Dragon series instead of an official sequel. The two lead characters in Rage of the Dragons, Billy and Jimmy Lewis, share their names with the protagonists of the Double Dragon series, Billy and Jimmy Lee, while Kang is based on Burnov from Double Dragon II: The Revenge, and the boss character Abubo is based on Abobo from the original Double Dragon. Two supporting characters in Rage, Linda (Abubo's female assistant) and Mariah (Jimmy's girlfriend), are also based on Double Dragon characters. Jimmy, Lynn, Elias and Annie would later appear as hidden guest characters in Matrimelee, a fighting game also produced by Noise Factory. Coincidentally, Atlus, the company that originally produced the Power Instinct series, published Double Dragon Advance for Million. The game was co-designed by Mario Vargas and Eduardo d' Palma, who would later work in the anime industry. The soundtrack was composed by Toshikazu Tanaka, who was previously employed at SNK and worked on projects such as Fatal Fury: King of Fighters. Prior to launch, French magazine HardCore Gamers noted the inclusion of both Billy and Jimmy from Double Dragon in the game.

== Reception ==
Spanish magazine Gametype gave Rage of the Dragons a positive review. Monthly Arcadia reported on their September 2002 issue that the game was the sixth most popular release in Japan. Double Dragon original creator Yoshihisa Kishimoto stated he had "nothing to do with Rage of the Dragons". In 2012, Complex ranked this "sequel to the first Double Dragon fighting game" as the 13th best SNK fighting game ever made. Kurt Kalata of Hardcore Gaming 101 regarded the game as "an excellent game for anyone into late era 2D fighters, and doubly so for its rad character designs and awesome soundtrack".
