= Double Dragon Advance =

2003 video game

- In homage to the film Way of the Dragon, the cover depicts Billy and Jimmy in a fighting pose in the same way as the promotional shot of Bruce Lee and Chuck Norris (respectively).
- Developer: Million
- Publisher: Atlus
- Designer: Muneki Ebinuma
- Series: Double Dragon
- Platform: Game Boy Advance
- Release: NA: November 12, 2003; JP: March 5, 2004
- Genre: Beat 'em up
- Modes: Single-played, multiplayer

Double Dragon Advance (Note: Japanese: ダブルドラゴンアドバンス, Hepburn: Daburu Doragon Adobansu) is a 2003 beat 'em up video game developed by Japanese studio Million and published by Atlus for the Game Boy Advance. It is a remake of Technōs Japan's 1987 arcade game Double Dragon and incorporates elements from its sequels and home versions.

It was rereleased on Steam, PS4, Xbox and Nintendo Switch on 8th November 2023.

== Gameplay ==
A screenshot of the 1-Player Double Dragon mode, with the player taking control of Billy.

Like in the original arcade game, the player takes control of martial arts masters Billy Lee, or his brother Jimmy, as they fight their way against the members of the Shadow Warriors in order to rescue Billy's girlfriend Marian. Double Dragon Advance can be played alone or with another player via a Game Link Cable. A third game mode allows a single player to play the game as both Lee brothers, with one character being controlled by the player while the other stands idle until the player switches character. There is also a Survival Mode in which the player must defeat as many adversaries possible in a single life.

All of the player's techniques from the original arcade game are featured, as well as several new ones based on later arcade and console versions (such as the Hyper Uppercut and the Hyper Knee from the NES version of The Revenge), as well as other beat-'em-ups by Technos such as Renegade and The Combatribes (like the sit-on-punch and the jump stomp respectively). New weapons are also added as well, including nunchakus and double kali sticks.

Four new stages were added as well, all taking place between the original stages from the arcade version. These include a Chinatown stage, a fight atop a moving truck (both inspired by Super Double Dragon), a cavern stage (similar to the one from the first NES game), and a fortress before the final stage. Most of the enemy characters from the first two arcade games are featured, along with a few new ones introduced in this version such as the Twin Tigers Hong and Huang, Kikucho, and the Five Emperors led by Raymond (a group of rival martial artists modeled after the final boss from the NES version of Double Dragon II). Moves that could not be performed on certain enemies in the original arcade games can now be performed against them in this version such as the hair-pull on the big characters in Abobo, and Burnov.

== Development and release ==
Former Technōs employee Muneki Ebinuma designed Double Dragon Advance, having previously worked on both Super Double Dragon (1992) and Double Dragon (1995). Ebinuma conceived Advance as a way to preserve the legacy of the original Double Dragon arcade game while making up for the perceived shortcomings of the games in the series he had worked on before. To this end, the fighting mechanics of Advance largely mirror those of the original arcade game combined with elements from the NES games and Super Double Dragon.

The Japanese version of Double Dragon Advance, released four months after the initial North American version, features a few slight changes. The Sound Test on the Option Mode is available by default and does not require a code, and a Gallery is made available on the main menu after the completing the game on the Expert setting. The Special Thanks on the end credits now mentions Bruce Lee, as well as Yoshihisa Kishimoto, the director of the Double Dragon arcade game. The game's difficulty has been rebalanced and a few minor bugs were fixed. The Japanese version's instruction manual includes additional character profiles, as well as a list of combos.

== Reception ==
Reception

Aggregate scores
Aggregator	Score
GameRankings	75%
Metacritic	75/100

Double Dragon Advance garnered generally positive reviews, with a few of the criticisms aimed at the short length of the game. Alex Navarro of GameSpot gave the game a score of 8.3 and wrote "while (the game) may prove to be a bit too fleeting for anyone seeking a long-lasting gameplay experience and the additional gameplay modes are a bit too restrictive in the design for what they're supposed to be, the game is still great fun and is definitely worth playing through long after you've beaten it the first time". Justin Leeper of Game Informer, who gave the game an overall score of 9, wrote: "It's still no 30-hour marathon, but Atlus has added a whole lot to an already-excellent beat ‘em up".

While the game was praised by fans as a superior version of the 1987 classic, the most controversial decisions by Ebinuma was choosing not to develop the next installments such as Double Dragon Advance II: The Revenge and Double Dragon Advance 3: The Rosetta Stone, but instead cram most of the elements of the two sequels into this game such as the CPU-enemies like Burnov as well as new levels, which owes to limitations in both cartridge size and the scope of the project, the development team excised several planned features, including an extended playable prologue sequence and game modes where players could take control of either the CPU-enemy Abobo or NPC-ally Marian as available fighters.

== See also ==
- River City Ransom EX
