= Double Dragon II (disambiguation) =

Double Dragon II may refer to:

- Double Dragon II: The Revenge, a 1988 arcade game.
- Double Dragon II: The Revenge (NES video game), a 1989 NES video game.
- Double Dragon II (Game Boy), a 1991 Game Boy video game.
