= Alice Carroll =

Alice Carroll may refer to:

- A character in the manga Aria
- A character in the video game Rage of the Dragons
