= Double Dragon IV =

2017 video game

- Developer: Arc System Works
- Publisher: Arc System Works
- Director: Yoshihisa Kishimoto
- Producer: Takaomi Kaneko
- Programmer: Kei Oyama
- Artist: Koji Ogata
- Composer: Kazunaka Yamane
- Series: Double Dragon
- Engine: Unity
- Platforms: PlayStation 4 Windows; Nintendo Switch; Android iOS; Xbox One
- Release: PlayStation 4: WW: January 29, 2017; JP: February 8, 2017; Windows: WW: January 30, 2017; Nintendo Switch: WW: September 7, 2017; Xbox One: WW: April 23, 2020
- Genre: Beat 'em up
- Modes: Single-player, multiplayer

Double Dragon IV (Japanese: ダブルドラゴン IV, Hepburn: Daburu Doragon IV) is a beat 'em up video game developed and published by Arc System Works for PlayStation 4, Windows, Nintendo Switch, and Xbox One. It is part of the Double Dragon series.

== Gameplay ==
The game is heavily influenced by Double Dragon II and features the return of protagonists Jimmy and Billy Lee, as well as enemies such as Abobo.

In addition to a story mode, the game includes a two-player duel mode and a tower battle mode. Enemies and bosses as well as hidden characters can be unlocked for Story and Duel modes through Tower Mode.

== Plot ==
After the defeat of the Black Warriors in Double Dragon II, Billy and Jimmy Lee look to spread their Sōsetsuken martial art by establishing dojos around the country. However, they soon face a new threat in a gang called the Renegades, who have teamed up with the Black Warriors to put an end to Billy and Jimmy once and for all.

== Development ==
Unlike earlier games in the series, this sequel is developed by Arc System Works, which was the developer of the Master System version of the first Double Dragon game and acquired the series rights in 2015 from defunct original publisher Technōs Japan. Several series developers continued to the project, including the original director, character designer, and composer with production led by Arc System Works designer Takaomi Kaneko. The game was announced in late December 2016 via a gameplay trailer. GameSpot had expected a graphical update, similar to Double Dragon Neon, but the new sequel's gameplay and graphics are more akin to the ports made for the Nintendo Entertainment System, with several character sprites taken directly from those titles, rather than the arcade original.

Producer Takaomi Kaneko said the team made the decision use Double Dragon II for the NES as a template because the game sported the same visuals in Japan and the rest of the world. Composer Kazunaka Yamane based the soundtrack on the original NES Double Dragon games he had worked on in the past, although at first he could not find his original compositions for the past games. His new music was subsequently converted to a retro 8-bit style soundtrack that is available as an option in the game. Similarly, character designer Koji Ogata, who had also worked on Double Dragon II: The Revenge also tried to preserve the classic graphics from the older game, while adding new animations and backgrounds. The game's development team had only five members, a smaller team than the ones that worked on the NES titles.

The game was released digitally on January 30, 2017, for PlayStation 4 and January 31 for Windows. A version for Nintendo Switch was released digitally on September 7. The game received a limited physical release on the PlayStation 4 on December 8 the same year, and on 2022 on Nintendo Switch by Limited Run Games.

== Reception ==
Reception

Aggregate score
Aggregator	Score
Metacritic	PC: 50/100; PS4: 49/100

Review scores
Publication	Score
Destructoid	6/10
Electronic Gaming Monthly	6/10
Game Informer	6/10
GameSpot	5/10
IGN	3.5/10
TouchArcade	3/5

According to video game review aggregator Metacritic, the PS4 has a score of 49, indicating "generally unfavorable reviews", while the PC version has a score of 50, indicating "mixed or average reviews". Destructoid gave it a 6/10, praising the retro aesthetic. IGN awarded it a score of 3.5/10.
