= Bimmy =

Bimmy may refer to:

- A nautical term for a punitive instrument, used in flagellation
- A misspelling of the name "Billy" in the video game Double Dragon III: The Sacred Stones
