= Double Dragon V: The Shadow Falls =

1994 video game

- North American SNES cover art by Julie Bell
- Developers: Leland Interactive Media; Telegames (Jaguar)
- Publishers: Tradewest; Jaguar: NA/EU: Williams Entertainment; JP: Messe Sansao, Inc.
- Director: Kevin Lydy
- Producer: Michael Abbot
- Designers: Stan Gorman; Timothy Heydelaar
- Programmers: David Schwartz; Mike Waltman
- Artists: Francisco Gracia; Franz Borowitz; Greg Miller
- Writer: Derek Benson
- Composer: Robert Atesalp
- Series: Double Dragon
- Platforms: Super NES, Sega Genesis, Atari Jaguar
- Release: August 5, 1994: Super NES; NA: August 5, 1994; EU: 1994 Genesis; NA: August 5, 1994 Jaguar; NA: April 1, 1995; EU: April 1995; JP: July 1995
- Genre: Fighting
- Modes: Single-player, multiplayer

Double Dragon V: The Shadow Falls is a fighting game developed by Leland Interactive Media and published by Tradewest for the Super Nintendo Entertainment System and Sega Genesis in 1994. A port for the Atari Jaguar developed by Telegames was released the following year. It is an American-produced sequel to the Double Dragon series by Technōs Japan, who had little to no credited involvement in the development of the game outside of licensing the IP to the publisher outside Japan.

Unlike previous games in the series, which were side-scrolling beat 'em ups, Double Dragon V: The Shadow Falls is a head-to-head fighting game based on the Double Dragon animated series. Technōs would eventually produce their own fighting game based on the 1994 live-action Double Dragon film for the Neo Geo the following year, simply titled Double Dragon.

Double Dragon V: The Shadow Falls received mixed reception since it was released for the SNES and Genesis. Critics felt it was an unexceptional but respectable clone of Street Fighter II and gave positive comments in regards to the graphics and the sprite quality. However, the Jaguar version received negative reception from reviewers, who felt that the port did not improve upon the graphics and audio from the 16-bit versions and had a needlessly difficult controls layout.

== Gameplay ==
Gameplay screenshot of the SNES version, showcasing a match between Sekka and Trigger Happy.

Double Dragon V: The Shadow Falls is a fighting game that follows the 8-way directional pad/stick and 6-button layout common to most fighting games at the time (including Street Fighter II), consisting of weak, medium and strong punches and kicks. The Genesis version supports the standard 3-button controller (making use of the start button to toggle between punches and kicks), as well as the 6-button controller released the previous year, while the Jaguar version makes use of its 3-button controller for punches and the 3, 6 and 9 keypad buttons for kicks instead. Characters have several special moves, as well as finishing moves called "Overkills" where the losing character has their own unique death animation when defeated by a certain type of basic attack.

The game features four game modes to choose from: Tournament, Vs. Battle, Quest, and Watch. Tournament is an arcade-style single player mode, where the player competes against a series of computer-controlled opponents, with each character having their own ending. Vs. Battle is a two-player mode where one player battles another. Quest is an alternate single player mode where one competes in a series of plot-based matches and the player can choose to play as one of the Lee brothers, who are on a mission to stop the Shadow Master from releasing a plague, or play as one of the Shadow Warriors, who must compete to become the Shadow Master's new second-in-command. In Quest Mode, the player can also adjust the attributes of their own character. Watch Mode allows the player to pit two computer-controlled characters against each other. There is also a Dossiers mode, where the player gets to view the game's character profiles, as well as an Options mode to adjust the difficulty setting, control configuration and other features.

== Characters ==
Shadow Falls has a character roster of twelve fighters — ten immediately playable characters (the two "Double Dragons" and eight Shadow Warriors) and two end bosses. Many of the characters are taken from the Double Dragon animated series that aired during the game's release. Only Bones, Sekka, Blade, and Dominique are original characters, with Blade's design being based on the generic Shadow Warrior soldiers who were on the show. Dominique and the Shadow Master are playable in the Super NES and Genesis versions via a code. In the Jaguar version, Blade, Trigger Happy, and Icepick were removed, while Dominique became part of the default roster.

=== The Double Dragons ===
- Billy Lee - raised by the Oldest Dragon after being left at the Dragon Dojo by his father John Lee to find his twin brother, he was raised as a Dragon Master to obey the code to the letter. After meeting his brother Jimmy, he decides to fight and becomes a Double Dragon. He is noble and only fights when he must.
- Jimmy Lee - raised by the Shadow Master and fooled into believing the Shadow Master was his father, he was raised to be the Shadow Boss and be evil. After being betrayed by the Shadow Warriors, he joins with Billy as a Double Dragon. He is reckless and always gets in trouble.

=== The Shadow Warriors ===
- Shadow Master - the master of all Shadow Warriors, he is evil and deceptive. His ultimate goal is to cover the world in darkness and shadow. He has many powers which include shapeshifting and teleporting, and he is able to trap warriors who fail him in the Shadow Mural. He has a scythe, the lower half of which can detach and be used as the sword. He is the final boss of the game.
- Dominique - a dangerous dominatrix with a whip and knives at the tips of her high heels, Dominique is the personal bodyguard of the Shadow Master and is his most loyal and devoted minion. She is a sub-boss who precedes the Shadow Master.
- Jawbreaker - a monstrous pink-skinned mutant, he will eat anything and anyone. He has a large jaw with sharp teeth and can bite a chunk out of anything.
- Icepick - a cyborg and computer expert, Icepick's body is entirely made of solid Crystal which gives him an Ice-Man like appearance. He fights using a sword and dagger with ice powers.
- Bones - an undead skeleton resurrected by the Shadow Master who is influenced by rock n' roll and has a tattoo of a cobra on his forehead. He wields a laser rifle.
- Sickle - a rude and cruel street fighter and criminal. He fights with two rather large red sickles.
- Blade - a French cuisine expert and hired mercenary of the Shadow warriors. His weapons are crimson blades on his gauntlets.
- Trigger Happy - a large brute ex-military who loves to destroy and shoot at things, he loves chaos. He uses a hand mounted blaster to fire at unsuspecting people.
- Countdown - a robotically enhanced cyborg. He attacks with shoulder mounted rocket blasters and laser vision, he was manipulated into betraying the Shadow Master and was punished for his treason, Countdown fights for his survival now.
- Sekka - a television personality and mercenary who was hired by the Shadow Master, she is more interested in her payment than the Shadow Warriors' cause and follows her own agenda, making her more neutral. Sekka wears a combat armor and claws similar to Blade on the end of her gauntlets.

== Development and release ==
The Atari Jaguar port was showcased in a playable state at the SCES '94. The Jaguar version was developed at Telegames' CDG division by Ed Salvo, who previously worked on titles for the Atari 2600 such as Apollo's Spacechase and Wizard Video Games' The Texas Chainsaw Massacre, along with his wife Janet Salvo and former VSS employee David Mahaffey.

Double Dragon V was released in North America on August 5, 1994. The Atari Jaguar version was released in both North America and Europe in April 1995, and later in Japan in July of the same year by Messe Sansao.

== Reception ==
Reception

Aggregate score
Aggregator	Score		
Aggregator	Atari Jaguar	Sega Genesis	SNES
GameRankings	N/A	N/A	53%

Review scores
Publication	Score		
Publication	Atari Jaguar	Sega Genesis	SNES
Electronic Gaming Monthly	6.875 / 10	N/A	5.25 / 10
Game Players	N/A	65%	N/A
M! Games	N/A	N/A	45%
Mega Fun	19%	N/A	N/A
Next Generation	2/5	N/A	N/A
Nintendo Power	N/A	N/A	12.4 / 20; 3.1/5
Super Play	N/A	N/A	39%
Video Games (DE)	39%	39%	N/A
VideoGames & Computer Entertainment	6 / 10	8 / 10	7 / 10
Play Time	19%	N/A	N/A
Sega Pro	N/A	63 / 100	N/A
Total!	N/A	N/A	4-
Ultimate Future Games	23%	N/A	N/A

The original release for the SNES generally received mixed reviews. GamePro described the game as an unoriginal but competent Street Fighter II clone with good character sprites and a variety of options. The four reviewers of Electronic Gaming Monthly commented that the game would appeal to younger gamers with its cartoon style and easy-to-perform moves, but summarized it as a strictly average entry among the many fighting games on the market.

Reviewing the Genesis version, GamePro again described it as a passable Street Fighter clone, but were generally more dismal in their assessment, commenting that most of the special moves are difficult to execute and the game is too simplistic to appeal to experienced fighting game fans. They also found the sound effects so bad that they recommended turning them off.

The later Atari Jaguar version received generally negative reviews. The four reviewers of Electronic Gaming Monthly unanimously agreed that the game is better than the Jaguar's previous fighting games (Kasumi Ninja and Dragon: The Bruce Lee Story) but substandard in absolute terms. Their chief criticisms were that the Jaguar version has the same graphics and audio as the by-then outdated SNES version, and has far worse controls, with the use of the Jaguar controller's number pad making it almost impossible to execute special attacks. GamePro's reviewer expressed little problem with the controls but still panned the game, criticizing the "headache-inducing music" and arguing that it is unacceptable for a game which was graphically average even on 16-bit systems to be ported to a 64-bit system with no enhancements aside from the backgrounds. Next Generation said that some characters in the game have good designs, but called art and animation flat and stilted, respectively. They also concurred that the background improvements in the Jaguar version were not enough to make the game's graphics better than mediocre.
