= Abobo's Big Adventure =

2012 video game

- Developer: Team Bobo
- Publisher: Team Bobo
- Designer: Roger Barr
- Programmer: Nick Pasto
- Artist: PoxPower
- Writer: Roger Barr
- Engine: Adobe Flash
- Platform: Browser
- Release: January 11, 2012
- Genre: Beat 'em up
- Modes: Single-player, multiplayer

Abobo's Big Adventure is a freeware parody beat 'em up video game developed by Team Bobo. Inspired by various video games released for the Nintendo Entertainment System, the game is an unlicensed parody of the Double Dragon series. It features Abobo, a boss character from the series, traveling through the worlds of several different games to save his son. Written by I-Mockery.com founder Roger Barr, programmed by Nick Pasto (AKA: PestoForce/BoMToons), with art and animation by PoxPower, Abobo's Big Adventure was released in January 2012 to positive critical reception.

== Gameplay and plot ==
The player's objective in Abobo's Big Adventure is to proceed through different levels of the game using the character Abobo from Double Dragon. The game itself is split into different sub-games that follow one another, each an homage to a particular game: "Double Drabobo", "Super Mabobo", "Urban Chabobo", "Zeld Abobo", "Balloon Abobo", "Pro Wrabobo", "Mega Mabobo/Megabobo", "Contrabobo", and "Punch Abobo". Each game makes use of the directional keys to control the movement of the character, while the 'A' and 'S' keys perform functions related to the particular sub-game, such as punching and kicking respectively. Abobo has a rage meter that increases when he hits enemies and decreases when he is hit; when the meter is completely filled, the player can press 'A' and 'S' together to perform a special attack that destroys or greatly damages all enemies on the screen. With the exception of the "Contra Bobo" level, each level is single player only.

The game's plot revolves around Abobo's son, Aboboy, who is kidnapped in the opening cutscene in a nod to the opening of Double Dragon. The game's levels are mostly linear, featuring several references to other Nintendo Entertainment System properties with their enemies and layout. Before the final level, Abobo encounters Jerome "Doc" Louis from the Punch-Out!! series. Doc reveals that the real villain is his former pupil, Little Mac, who went mad with power after winning the championship. Abobo defeats Little Mac in a boxing match, decapitates him with the Power Glove, sending his head flying through the NES Multiverse, and rescues Aboboy. As the crowd cheers for the reunited pair, they suddenly leap out of the ring and begin to graphically murder everyone within reach. The events of the game are finally revealed as a dream Abobo is having, a reference to the ending of Super Mario Bros. 2.

== Development ==
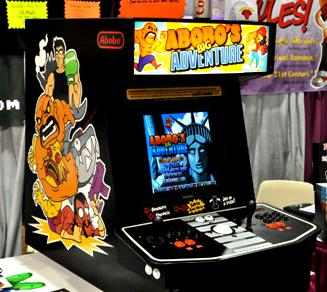
The arcade cabinet's controls were designed to resemble a NES controller, while a trackball acted as a mouse.

Development on the game was started in 2002 by I-Mockery founder Roger Barr, who intended it to be his first full-length flash-based game and to feature his favorite NES character, Abobo. Working with a programmer nicknamed "Bane", they put together several early levels. However the game was delayed by various side projects, including a game with a similar concept named "Domo-Kun's Angry Smashfest". He later returned to the game with the help of developers Nick Pasto of PestoForce/BoMToons and "Pox" of The Pox Box, and after mapping out the storyline decided to start the project over from scratch in 2006 due to dissatisfaction with the early work, and the feel that the original programming strayed too far from the feel of an actual NES.

Level development was done by playing NES titles and taking notes on which characters they wished to include and where. Rather than have each level feature just one group of enemies from the same game, they would instead act as a tribute to the system as a whole and feature a variety of them. During the course of development, smaller projects were also done in order to keep themselves motivated and meet financial obligations. By 2009, the first three levels of the game were completed and revealed at San Diego Comic-Con, playable with a NES controller as originally intended. With the game well-received, they resumed work, using feedback from the test to fix bugs and issues, and in 2010 presented the game at the following Comic-con in a free-to-play arcade cabinet, with artwork made by Jeff Bandelin of Newgrounds.

Though the game was delayed heavily in 2011, they intended to release it at the end of December. In September of that year, Barr took the game with him on a comedy tour he was invited to attend with Keith Apicary, showcasing it at various arcades and game shops. An official trailer followed shortly after, and in response to numerous donations they had received, they began work on a smaller game called "Aboboy's Small Adventure" for anyone who donated, though it pushed the release date for the completed project further. On January 11, 2012 the game was released on Newgrounds.com, with an added tutorial explaining how to play the game with a NES controller. A downloadable version of the game has also been released, while the team plans to continue to showcase the arcade cabinet at various conventions.

== Reception ==
The game was positively received at its release. Abobo's Big Adventure won the Newgrounds 2012 "Game of the Year" award. GameSpy praised their work, calling it the "mother of all 8-bit homage flash videogames" Mexican magazine Cine Premiere called it fun, and a good way to re-live the nostalgia of 8- and 16-bit video games. GameZone described it as "part parody and part tribute" to the NES, further calling its story "not cheesy. Instead, it's all kinds of badass." Eurogamer.it called it a "serious contender for [Game of the Year] 2012" and "The final tribute to the NES", further describing it as both well made and very difficult. Rock, Paper, Shotgun's Adam Smith stated that while the combination of various sprite styles could be reminiscent of various webcomics, the game was created with the original influences in mind, not just the characters. He further added that it was a "well designed series of tiny games that more often than not succeed in capturing the pleasures of the originals". Wired called it "8-bit parody done right", further praising it for deviating from similar titles by offering more than simplified graphics and sounds, and that "the fearlessness with which it mocks these age-old heroes portrays an almost tangible love for them at the same time". 1UP.com editors Jeremy Parish and Bob Mackey both praised the game as well, with Parish questioning whether it blurred the line between "parody and appropriation [...] you could make a case for it being a Dada-ist expression", while Mackey asserted he still felt it was parody, but that the controls for each aspect of the game had been replicated "dead on." GameSpot praised the game saying "It's a labor of love that's jam-packed with a staggering number of pitch-perfect references to NES games. It doesn't just duplicate the sprites, environments, and music of so many NES games; it also captures the simple but challenging gameplay of the games it imitates." Yoshihisa Kishimoto, creator of Double Dragon, has stated in a Polygon interview that he was supportive and loved the game.
