= Double Dragon III: The Sacred Stones =

1991 video game

- North American box art, also used for the Game Boy version of Double Dragon II
- Developer: Technōs Japan
- Publishers: JP: Technōs Japan; NA/PAL: Acclaim Entertainment
- Designers: Nobuyuki Sawada; Yoshihisa Kishimoto; Tsutomu Ando; Masamichi Katagiri
- Programmers: Sato; Shintaro Kumagai
- Composers: Akira Inoue; Takaro Nozaki; Michiya Hirasawa; Yoshihiro Kameoka
- Series: Double Dragon
- Platform: Nintendo Entertainment System
- Release: JP: February 22, 1991; NA: February 1991; PAL: November 24, 1994
- Genre: Beat 'em up
- Modes: Single-player, multiplayer

Double Dragon III: The Sacred Stones, released in Japan as Double Dragon III: The Rosetta Stone (ダブルドラゴンIII ザ・ロゼッタストーン), is a 1991 beat 'em up video game developed by Technōs Japan for the Nintendo Entertainment System. It was the third Double Dragon game for the NES, and was published in North America and Europe by Acclaim Entertainment. Although it loosely based on the similarly titled arcade game Double Dragon 3: The Rosetta Stone, it is not a port, but a parallel project that was developed at the same time.

== Plot ==
A year after the downfall of the Shadow Warriors, a new enemy threatens Billy and Jimmy Lee, as Marion is kidnapped by a mysterious organization. The only witness to her kidnapping, Brett, dies before he could divulge their leader's true identity. A fortune teller named Hiruko informs the Lee brothers that Marion's kidnappers are searching for the three Sacred Stones of Power that had been scattered around the world and that the only way to rescue her is to procure them before the kidnappers do. After the initial battle in the United States, the Lee brothers embark on a worldwide journey to find the stones, which takes them to China, Japan and Italy, where they face numerous formidable fighters in each country. The final stage is set in Egypt, where the Lee brothers uncover the truth about Marion's disappearance and come face to face with the true leader of the enemy.

== Gameplay ==
Double Dragon III can be played by one or two players simultaneously, with an "A mode" where both players can not harm each other and a "B mode" that allows friendly fire. Like its arcade counterpart, the NES version of Double Dragon III reverts to having punch and kick buttons as the standard control scheme and the ability to dash by pressing the d-pad left or right twice has been added. The rest of the combat system is a bit closer to the previous NES games, retaining the hair grab move that was removed in the arcade version (although the shoulder throw is gone, as well as the flying knee kick and hyper uppercut from the NES version of Double Dragon II: The Revenge). New moves in this version include a running jump kick (which can become a triangle jump kick when performed on a wall) and a midair somersault that allows the player to throw enemies by jumping on them. During 2-player mode, when both players are controlling each Lee brother, they can perform a twin cyclone spin kick and a triangle jump kick.

The game discards the traditional lives system from the previous NES installments, as well as the item shops from the arcade version. Instead, the player gains the ability to control two new fighters in addition to the Lee brothers as they progress through the game. These extra fighters join the player's party once they've been defeated as enemy bosses. Chin Seimei (陳 清明), a Chinese martial arts master, joins at the end of Mission 2, while Yagyu Ranzou (柳生 乱蔵, Yagyū Ranzō), the head of a ninja clan, appears at the end of Mission 3. By pressing the Select button at any point (provided the player character is not in the middle of an attack animation or receiving damage), the player can access a character selection screen and switch between any of the available fighters. Each fighter has his own fighting techniques, health points and speed, making them suitable for different situations. When the player loses a fighter, he will automatically change to the next available character until the entire party has been defeated. Normally the game ends when the player's entire party has been defeated, but a continue option is available for the final two stages if the player loses all their characters the first time.

In addition to fighting unarmed (or with a sword in Ranzou's case), each fighter has a backup weapon that they can draw at any time from the character selection screen, but can only be used for a limited time. This feature allows the Lee brothers to use nunchakus, Chin to wield an iron claw and Ranzou to throw shurikens. Weapons can also be obtained by disarming certain enemies, although only the Lee brothers and Chin can arm themselves with enemy weapons (which include a throwing knife, a sai and a beer bottle). An enemy's weapons can be used as long as the original wielder is alive.

== Regional differences ==
The English version altered the plot of the game during the translation process, as the Japanese version (titled Double Dragon III: The Rosetta Stone) features a script that is much closer to the arcade game. While the English version involves another rescue mission to save Marion, there is no mention of her in the Japanese script and the Lee brothers are simply searching for the stones in order to become the world's strongest fighters (the final boss is a resurrected Cleopatra instead of Princess Noiram). Additionally, the death of Brett (whose name was Aldo in the Japanese version) was not connected to the search for the stones, but rather the culprit turns out to be Jim, the boss of the first stage, who is revealed to be the brother of Willy from the original Double Dragon (a subplot that was eliminated in the English version). Additionally, the purpose of the trip to Italy was to find a clue to solving the riddle of Egypt, rather than train for the big battle; it turns out that the boss of this stage, a shirtless muscle-bound gladiator, had the map of the Pyramid, and rather than revealing in the third stage that Hiruko had the last stone, it is in the Italy stage that she reveals she has it. Lastly, the difficulty is slightly different between the two versions. In the Japanese version, the player starts each stage with more health for their characters and there are fewer enemies to fight. However, the ending of the Japanese version differs depending on which of the player characters are still alive by the end of the game, whereas the English version always shows the complete ending with all four protagonists no matter what.

While Billy's name is spelled correctly throughout most of the game, even in the one-player version of the opening, the opening of the two-players mode has his name misspelled as "Bimmy" when both Lee brothers are shown together on the first screen. While this mistake is often attributed to a translation error, the English script is not a direct translation of the Japanese original, as the story underwent changes during the localization. A promotional flyer for the Famicom version features a more direct translation of the original opening text, which spells the name correctly. This typo served as the inspiration for the enemy characters "Bimmy 'n' Jammy" in Double Dragon Neon, deformed clones of the Lee brothers who are described by their introductory tag line as "Mistranslated Mutants".

== Reception ==
Reception

Review score
| Publication | Score |
|---|---|
| Famitsu | 4/10, 7/10, 6/10, 4/10 |

Double Dragon III: The Sacred Stones was released for the Family Computer in Japan on February 22, 1991.

The NES version of Double Dragon III was the seventh best-selling console game in the United States during its month of release (February 1991), according to sales data from the Software Publishers Association. However, Acclaim Entertainment overestimated demand for the title, resulting with half a million unsold stocks of the title in their storehouse according to Electronic Gaming Monthly.
