= Double Dragon =

Video game series

- iOS/Android version logo
- Genre: Beat-'em-up
- Developers: Technōs Japan; WayForward Technologies; Arc System Works; Yuke's
- Publishers: Technōs Japan; Taito; SNK; Million Corp. Atlus; Arc System Works
- Creator: Yoshihisa Kishimoto
- Platform: Arcade: NES, Master System, Atari 2600, Atari 7800, Game Boy, Mega Drive/Genesis, Atari Lynx, Game Gear, Super NES, Atari Jaguar, Neo Geo, Neo Geo CD, PlayStation, PlayStation 3, Game Boy Advance, Xbox 360, PlayStation 4, PlayStation 5, iOS, Android, MS-DOS, Windows, Amiga, Commodore 64, Atari ST, ZX Spectrum, Amstrad CPC, MSX, Zeebo, Nintendo Switch, Xbox One, Xbox Series X/S,
- First release: Double Dragon; April 22, 1987
- Latest release: Double Dragon Revive; October 23, 2025

Double Dragon (双截龍(ダブルドラゴン), Daburu Doragon) is a beat 'em up video game series originally developed and published by Technōs Japan. It began with the release of the arcade game Double Dragon in 1987. The series features twin martial artists, Billy and Jimmy Lee, as they fight against various adversaries and rivals.

The original Double Dragon was a hit arcade video game, ushering in a "Golden Age" for the beat 'em up genre, resulting in a flood of beat 'em ups during the late 1980s to 1990s that followed the conventions set by Double Dragon. Technōs rapidly released sequels in the early 1990s, which led to a large number of developers creating titles with wildly different tone, gameplay and quality. A 1993 animated series and 1994 live-action film adaptation were widely panned by critics and audiences. The studio faced bankruptcy after several commercial failures in 1996, leaving the franchise inactive.

The licensed passed to Million, a collective of former Technōs developers, and the group licensed many poorly received remakes through the 2000s. Million was a small company which lacked the funds to defend the IP, which also led to unlicensed titles such as Rage of the Dragons (2002) being made by other groups. Million sold the rights to Arc System Works in 2015, who revived the franchise beginning with Double Dragon IV (2017).

== Gameplay ==
The gameplay in most of the games takes place in a pseudo 3D perspective as seen in Renegade and later beat 'em ups, in which the player can move in four directions but is always facing left or right. In almost all cases the player moves to the right in a horizontally scrolling environment, encountering various enemies who attack and try to prevent the player from progressing. The player can perform a variety of unarmed fighting techniques against their enemies, as well as use melee weapons such as baseball bats and throwing knives normally obtained from enemies or found on the floor. In some installments, there are techniques that can be done in combination with another player, the game also has an elbow move that enables the player to move to keep hitting the enemy without getting hit when moving side to side on a fallen opponent.

== History ==
=== Technōs Japan (1987–1995) ===
Technōs Japan series entries Main titles in bold
1987	**Double Dragon**
1988	Double Dragon (NES)
1988	**Double Dragon II: The Revenge**
1989	Double Dragon II: The Revenge (NES)
1990	**Double Dragon 3: The Rosetta Stone**
1991	Double Dragon II (Game Boy)
1991	Double Dragon III: The Sacred Stones
1992	**Super Double Dragon**
1993	Battletoads/Double Dragon
1993	Double Dragon (Game Gear)
1994	**Double Dragon V: The Shadow Falls**
1995	Double Dragon '95

Double Dragon was created by Yoshihisa Kishimoto, while working at Technōs Japan in the mid-1980s. As a designer, Kishimoto had success with the arcade brawler Nekketsu Kouha Kunio-kun, known as Renegade in the west, and work began on a sequel to the game. Higher figures in the company suggested that the next game should support two players, which led Kishimoto to develop Double Dragon as a spiritual successor rather than a direct sequel. The name was drawn from Enter the Dragon, which also inspired Kishimoto. Double Dragon was released in arcades in 1987.

The game was both a critical and commercial success for Technōs, in both domestic and international markets. The game popularised the genre and has been considered among the greatest games of all time. Work began on home console ports, including a Nintendo Entertainment System version in 1988, and a Game Boy version in 1990. Various licensed versions were also produced by other developers for gaming platforms such as the Master System, Atari 2600, Atari 7800, Sega Genesis, Atari Lynx and for home computers. The popularity of the original in arcades began to wane after Capcom's Final Fight launched in 1989, however two sequels were made available; Double Dragon II: The Revenge in 1988 and Double Dragon 3: The Rosetta Stone in 1990. Both of these received ports to home consoles, however the Game Boy and NES versions are greatly different from the original arcade titles.

By the early 1990s Kishimoto had become disillusioned with Technōs; the company wanted to continue developing Double Dragon and Kunio-kun titles as they were selling well, but this did not afford him much room for innovation. He also disagreed with some of the company's spending decisions including their purchase of real estate and a racing team. His last contribution to the franchise in the era was Super Double Dragon for SNES in 1992; after this he left the company. Technōs continued developing further Double Dragon titles without Kishimoto, however these were not as successful as the original title. Kishimoto attributed this to a lack of consistency in tone, visual style, and gameplay, stemming from a large range of staff working on separate projects and a lack of communication between teams. These ventures included a humorous crossover with Battletoads and a cartoon series in 1993, which were followed by a live action film in 1994.

The fifth and final game in the original series, Double Dragon V: The Shadow Falls (1994) departed greatly from the formula and featured one on one combat in the vein of Street Fighter or Mortal Kombat; this game was a critical failure, featuring poor graphics, clunky gameplay and bizarre character designs. Technōs produced one final spin-off, an adaptation of the film for Neo Geo in 1995, but the game was poorly received. The company declared bankruptcy in 1996.

=== Million (1996–2015) ===
Million series entries
2003	Double Dragon Advance
2004	Double Dragon (mobile version)
2005	Double Dragon Ex
2006
2007	Double Dragon (Xbox Live Arcade version)
2008
2009	Double Dragon (Zeebo version)
2010
2011	Double Dragon (iPhone version)
2012	Double Dragon Neon
2013	Double Dragon II: Wander of the Dragons
2013	Double Dragon Trilogy

After Technōs Japan shut down in 1996, the franchise was left inactive until the early 2000s. The rights were bought up by Million, a company formed during Technōs' bankruptcy. The loss of the rights left a potential sequel to the 1995 game in limbo; it was developed independently and released without the IP as Rage of the Dragons in 2002. Million considered the spin-off illegal but lacked the funds to challenge its developers.

As a small company, Million did not directly produce any new titles for the franchise; they instead licensed the property to external developers, the majority of which developed remakes and reboots of the existing games. The original Double Dragon was remade six times from 2003 to 2011 by various groups. The first of these was Double Dragon Advance (2003), produced by Atlus for the Game Boy Advance. A poorly received mobile adapatation simply titled Mobile Dragon was released in 2004 by Bandai Mobile. That game was remade and released the following year as Double Dragon Ex. In 2007, the game was again remade for Xbox Live Arcade; players could choose either to emulate the Arcade original, or play the new version with high resolution graphics. A remake was released for the Zeebo in 2009, developed by Brizo Interactive and published by Tectoy. In 2011, a sixth remake was released for the iPhone, developed by Brizo Interactive and published by Aksys Games.

By the early 2010s, interest in the brawler genre had waned. In 2012, Million licensed the IP to WayForward Technologies to develop Double Dragon Neon, the only original Double Dragon game released under Million, which received mixed reception. An unlicensed fan project called Abobo's Big Adventure was released the same year to positive reception. The game drew praise from Kishimoto, who stated "I don't mind if people use the series as long as they make quality products."

Double Dragon II was remade as Double Dragon II: Wander of the Dragons for the Xbox Live Arcade by Gravity in 2013. The game was critically panned and is considered one of the worst games of all time. Million licensed one final compilation of the three arcade titles as Double Dragon Trilogy in 2013.

=== Arc System Works (2015–present) ===
Arc System Works series entries Main titles in bold
2017	**Double Dragon IV**
2018–2022
2023	Double Dragon Gaiden: Rise of the Dragons
2024
2025	**Double Dragon Revive**
2025	Double Dragon Dodgeball

In 2015, Arc System Works, the Japanese publisher for Double Dragon Neon, purchased the rights to the franchise from Million. The group began planning a revival of the series, notably rehiring original franchise creator Yoshihasa Kishimoto as director. The first new title was Double Dragon IV (not to be confused with Super Double Dragon) for PlayStation 4, PC, and Nintendo Switch. It takes place shortly after Double Dragon II: The Revenge and uses an 8-bit artstyle, similar to the NES ports of the earlier entries of the series. The title was developed by Arc System Works and other former Technōs staff including producer Takaomi Kaneko, character designer Koji Ogata, composer Kazunaka Yamane and programmer Kei Oyama.

In 2023, a spin-off of the franchise, titled Double Dragon Gaiden: Rise of the Dragons, was announced for Windows, Nintendo Switch, PlayStation 4, PlayStation 5, Xbox One and Xbox Series X/S, and was released on July 27, 2023.

Double Dragon Revive, an entry developed by Yuke's and published by Arc System Works, was released on October 23, 2025 for Nintendo Switch, PlayStation 4, PlayStation 5, Windows, Xbox One, and Xbox Series X/S. The game released to mixed reception. A 2D spin-off game, Double Dragon Dodgeball was also available as a pre-order bonus.

== Characters ==
=== Lee Brothers ===
Billy and Jimmy Lee, as depicted on the packaging artwork of Double Dragon Advance. Their poses in this image were modeled after the fight between Bruce Lee and Chuck Norris in Way of the Dragon.

For most of the series, players take control of martial artist William "Billy" Lee, who battles against various adversaries such as gang members and rival fighters. He is often assisted by his elder twin brother James "Jimmy" Lee, who usually serves as the second player's character in most of the games. The Lee brothers are characterized as successors of a fictional martial art known as Sōsetsuken (双截拳; "Twin Sever Fist", also known as Sōsaiken), which combines techniques from other styles such as karate, tai chi and Shorinji Kempo.

The duo were actually unnamed when the original arcade game was initially released in Japan, although the names Hammer and Spike were given to them in the cabinet and promotional flyer produced by Taito for the overseas version. The names Billy and Jimmy Lee were first established in the Famicom/NES version of the first game and consequently used in other console versions and tie-in products such as The Original Sound of Double Dragon soundtrack album, but were not actually used in the arcade versions until Double Dragon 3: The Rosetta Stone. Billy Lee's name comes from a combination of Bruce Lee's last name with the first name of his character Billy Lo from the movie Game of Death, while Jimmy is named after musician Jimmy Page.

Because of the differences between the arcade and console versions of the games, the designs of the Lee brothers tend to vary throughout the series. While the original arcade game has Player 1 controlling a blond-haired Lee brother dressed in a blue outfit and Player 2 as a brown-haired brother in red, the NES version had their hair and outfit colors switched around: Billy was now the brown-haired brother in blue, while Jimmy became the blond-haired brother in red. Super Double Dragon was the first game to have the Lee brothers sport different hairstyles during gameplay, with Billy being given a laid down hairstyle and Jimmy a spiky flat top, a design convention adopted by later games such as Double Dragon Advance and the smartphone versions, although some of the promotional art and in-game visuals for the earlier games (such as the ending photograph of Double Dragon II: The Revenge and the story sequences/character portraits of Double Dragon III: The Sacred Stones) had already depicted the Lee brothers with differing hairstyles. Other games such as the Neo Geo fighting game and Double Dragon Neon depict the Lee brothers as identical twins like in the first arcade game.

The two brothers are shown to be romantically interested in a young woman named Marian, a student in their dojo. The arcade version of the first game (along with most console versions) can end with both brothers fighting each other over Marian if two players reach the end together, with the survivor ultimately winning Marian's affections. The Famicom/NES version, which establishes Marian to be Billy's long-term girlfriend, changes the story so that Jimmy was actually the leader of the Black Warriors (a change made as a result of the lack of two-player cooperative play in that version) and was the one who orchestrated Marian's kidnapping.

=== Enemy characters ===
The enemy organization in the original Double Dragon are the Black Warriors gang, who are characterized as the dominant criminal organization in New York City after a nuclear war has left the city deprived of any law and order. Much like the Lee brothers themselves, the names of the gang members were established throughout the console versions of the series. The gang's original leader is the machine gun-toting Willy Mackey (commonly known simply as Willy), who wishes to acquire the knowledge of the Lee brothers' martial arts for himself and orders the kidnapping of Marian as ransom. Recurring members of the gang throughout the various versions of the first game include the thugs Williams and Rowper, dominatrix Linda and bald strongman Abobo. The arcade version also featured two unnamed head swaps of other characters (namely of Abobo and the Lee brothers) as end-stage bosses: although these characters were absent in the NES version, which instead introduced a unique enemy, a Chinese martial artist named Chin Taimei. The Lee brother head swap would later appear in the Mark III/Master System version released by Sega, where he was named Jeff.

The name of the gang would change in later games. While the arcade version of Double Dragon II: The Revenge had Willy and the Black Warriors retaliating against their earlier defeat by gunning down Marian, the Famicom version replaced Willy with a nameless fighter who led a mysterious armed group following the dissolution of the original Black Warriors. While unnamed in the Japanese version, the English localization of the NES version would refer to this organization as the Shadow Warriors (or the Black Shadow Warriors in the manual), a name later used for an unrelated enemy group in Super Double Dragon, as well as Willy's own gang in Double Dragon Advance. The Shadow Warriors was also the name of the villain group in the Double Dragon animated series and its tie-in game, Double Dragon V: The Shadow Falls, where they consisted almost entirely of new characters.

The names Williams and Rowper were derived from the characters played respectively by Jim Kelly and John Saxon in the movie Enter The Dragon. Other characters seem to follow a similar naming convention such as Linda, who shares her name with Bruce Lee's widow Linda Lee Cadwell, and the enemy character Bolo from Double Dragon II: The Revenge, who shares his name with actor Bolo Yeung.

== In other media ==
=== Crossovers and related games ===
- Super Spike V'Ball (NES) – the NES version which features Billy and Jimmy as playable characters.
- WWF Superstars (arcade) – features a cameo by Billy as one of the game's spectators.
- River City Ransom (NES) – the Double Dragon theme music plays during the battle against Randy and Andy, two characters based on Billy and Jimmy. The Japanese counterparts of Randy and Andy, Ryūichi and Ryūji, are recurring characters in the later Kunio-kun games. Abobo appears as a recurring enemy in the sequel, River City Ransom Underground.
- Battletoads/Double Dragon (NES, GB, Genesis, SNES) – a crossover game between the Double Dragon and Battletoads franchises.
- Voltage Fighter Gowcaizer (Neo Geo) – Burnov from the second game makes a cameo as Captain Atlantis' opponent in his ending.
- Rage of the Dragons (Neo Geo) – an unofficial homage to Double Dragon produced by Evoga and Noise Factory in association with Playmore which became the current incarnation of SNK. The main characters are named Billy and Jimmy Lewis.
- Abobo's Big Adventure (PC) – an unofficial parody of various Nintendo Entertainment System titles, including Double Dragon, and starring Abobo as the main character.
- River City: Rival Showdown (3DS) – both Billy and Jimmy Lee are playable characters in the Double Dragon Duel mode.
- River City Girls (PC, Switch, PlayStation 4, PlayStation 5, Xbox One) – the Lee Brothers have two Dojos in River City, where the player characters can acquire new fighting moves from the brothers in exchange for money. Abobo appears as a boss in the game, Marian (who now has a vastly different design while staying faithful to her Double Dragon Neon counterpart) and Skullmageddon as shop keepers, and Burnov works as a bouncer.
- River City Girls 2 (PC, Switch, PlayStation 4, PlayStation 5, Xbox One, Xbox Series X/S) – Marian appears as a playable character in the base game. Billy and Jimmy are playable via downloadable content.

=== Adaptations ===
A Double Dragon comic book limited series loosely based on the games was published by Marvel Comics in 1991, which lasted six issues from July to December. The comic book was written by Dwayne McDuffie for the first four issues and by Tom Brevoort and Mike Kanterovich for the final two. It features original villains and a unique story that explains the brothers' parentage.

Double Dragon is one of the video games featured in the Rock'n Game Boy manga by Shigeto Ikehara, which was published in Comic BomBom from October 1989 to December 1991.

A Double Dragon animated series was produced by DIC Animation City and Bohbot Entertainment, which originally aired in syndication on Bohbot's Amazin' Adventures block for two seasons from 1993 to 1995, lasting 26 episodes.

A film version of Double Dragon was released in theaters in 1994, directed by James Yukich and starring Scott Wolf and Mark Dacascos as the Lee brothers.

== Legacy ==
While not the first games in the genre, the original Double Dragon titles laid the foundations for modern beat 'em up games. They influenced the creation of titles such as Golden Axe, Ninja Gaiden and Final Fight, which firmly established beat 'em ups as a popular game genre.

Double Dragon ushered in a "Golden Age" for the beat 'em up genre that took it to new heights with its detailed set of martial arts attacks and its two-player cooperative gameplay. Double Dragon's success resulted in a flood of beat 'em ups in the late 1980s. Subsequent beat 'em ups during the late 1980s to 1990s followed the conventions set by Double Dragon.

Years later, original series creator Yoshihisa Kishimoto lamented the inconsistency in design and quality of the various versions and spin-offs of Double Dragon in games and other media. He attributed these failings to Technōs losing the control of the license and allowing a multitude of third parties to work on the franchise.
