= Double Dragon (TV series) =

1993 American-Italian TV series or program

- Genre: Action/Adventure
- Based on: Double Dragon by Technōs Japan
- Developed by: Phil Harnage; Martha Moran (season 2)
- Directed by: Chuck Patton
- Theme music composer: Clark Gassman
- Opening theme: "Double Dragon"
- Ending theme: "Double Dragon" (instrumental)
- Composers: Clark Gassman; Andy Street (season 2)
- Countries of origin: United States; Italy
- Original language: English
- No. of seasons: 2
- No. of episodes: 26

Production
- Executive producers: Allen J. Bohbot; Andy Heyward; Robby London; Avi Arad (season 1); Byron Cook (season 1)
- Producer: Chuck Patton
- Editor: Mark McNally
- Running time: 22 minutes
- Production companies: DIC Productions, L.P. (Note: Known as DIC Animation City during season 1.); Reteitalia, S.p.A. Tradewest; Bohbot Entertainment

Original release
- Network: Syndication (Amazin' Adventures) (United States); Italia 1 (Italy); Telecinco (Spain)
- Release: September 12, 1993 – December 4, 1994

Double Dragon is an animated series based on the NES versions of the Double Dragon video game trilogy, that ran for 26 half-hour episodes from 1993 to 1994. It was produced by DIC Animation City, Bohbot Entertainment, and Italian studio Reteitalia, S.p.A., in association with Spanish network Telecinco.

== Overview ==
The premise of the show is that the protagonist brothers are separated at birth. Billy is raised by an elderly martial arts master known as the Oldest Dragon, and his brother Jimmy is raised by the evil Shadow Master as his second-in-command, the Shadow Boss. As a result, the Lee brothers oppose each other as adults. When Jimmy is betrayed by the Shadow Master, he renounces his evil ways and joins his brother as a Dragon Warrior. During the course of the series, the brothers recruit allies in their war against the Shadow Master and his henchmen. The futile search for their father, John Lee, is a subplot throughout the series.

The plot of the pilot episode is loosely adapted from the NES version of the first Double Dragon game. The villains are the mysterious Shadow Boss (Jimmy's initial alter-ego), and his henchmen Abobo and Willy (who were based on enemy characters from the game). By the end of the second episode, Abobo and Willy are sucked into the Shadow Mural, never to be seen again, while Jimmy abandons his evil ways and reconciles with his brother to fight against the series' true antagonist, the Shadow Master. All of the characters introduced from the second episode onward are original creations made for the show, although most of the villains are also used in the Tradewest-produced Double Dragon V: The Shadow Falls, a 1-on-1 fighting game released for home consoles.

== Cast of characters ==
The Lee brothers are martial-arts instructors and police consultants, who assume superheroic identities at moments of escalated violence. They usually transform out of those forms by crossing swords again and saying in unison, "For Might! For Right! We are Double Dragons!", although several episodes show that heavy injury can deactivate their powers. Injury sustained by one is sometimes taken by the other. The brothers sometimes sense when the other is in danger.

In this series, the Double Dragons are adept in a mystical form of the Kenjutsu arts, even though in the games they have more of a mastery in both the Bōjutsu arts with any bō or club, and the Kusari-fundo arts involving any whip or nunchaku they can find.

Billy Lee is the former devoted Dragon Pupil turned graduated Dragon Master with messy black hair. He regularly dons armored hero's clothes that are blue, with a torn shirt and dragon-mask that are both red. Billy's personality is based on the wise, independent, and self-determined side of Bruce Lee.

Jimmy Lee is the former evil high-ranking Shadow Boss turned sarcastic Double Master with spiky blonde hair. He also dons armored hero's clothes, but his are red, with a torn shirt and a dragon-mask that are both blue. Jimmy's personality is based on the cocky, charismatic, and belligerent side of Bruce Lee.

Dragon Warriors are other martial artists recruited by the Lee brothers in their fight against the Shadow Warriors, bestowing them with superhuman powers through the use of a smokeless, green "dragon fire".

Junior Dragons are Billy and Jimmy's younger students, and supporting characters throughout the series.

The Shadow Warriors are the main antagonists, a criminal organization composed mostly of mutants. These mutants are created by "high levels of EMF generated by (Metro City's) ancient underground power grid". They are led by the Shadow Master, with many powers including shapeshifting and teleporting, and he is able to trap warriors who fail him in the Shadow Mural. He is the half-brother of Billy and Jimmy's mother.

== Episodes ==
=== Season 1 (1993) ===
No.	Title	Written by	Original release date	Prod. code
1	"The Shadow Falls"	Phil Harnage and Sandra Ryan	September 12, 1993	101
2	"The Legend Continues"	Phil Harnage and Martha Moran	September 19, 1993	102
3	"The Mistress of Chi"	Richard Mueller	September 26, 1993	106
4	"The Price of Oblivion"	Bob Forward	October 3, 1993	103
5	"River of Tears"	Pat Allee and Ben Hurst	October 10, 1993	104
6	"Over the Line"	Sandra Ryan	October 17, 1993	107
7	"Rebirth"	David Carren and Larry Carroll	October 24, 1993	108
8	"Judgment Day"	Mike O'Mahoney	October 31, 1993	105
9	"Dragon Hunt"	Kurt Weldon	November 7, 1993	111
10	"Call to Arms"	Phil Harnage	November 14, 1993	109
11	"The Heart of the Matter"	Martha Moran	November 21, 1993	110
12	"The Abyss"	Michael O'Mahoney	November 28, 1993	113
13	"The Eye of the Dragon"	Pat Allee and Ben Hurst	December 5, 1993	112

=== Season 2 (1994) ===
No.	Title	Written by	Original release date	Prod. code
14	"Shadow Khan"	Martha Moran	September 11, 1994	201
15	"Shadow Claw"	Phil Harnage	September 18, 1994	202
16	"Virtual Reality Bytes"	Rich Mueller	September 25, 1994	204
17	"Doom Claw"	Martha Moran	October 2, 1994	203
18	"Superhighway Warriors"	Rich Mueller	October 9, 1994	206
19	"Undertown"	Doug Booth	October 16, 1994	205
20	"The Spirit in the Sword"	Doug Booth	October 23, 1994	208
21	"Shadow Conned"	Martha Moran	October 30, 1994	209
22	"The Sight of Freedom"	Phil Harnage	November 6, 1994	211
23	"Ancients Arrive"	Sandra Ryan	November 13, 1994	210
24	"The Return of the Shadowmonster"	Doug Booth	November 20, 1994	212
25	"Daj of the Undertown Dragons"	Martha Moran	November 27, 1994	213
26	"RPM"	Phil Harnage	December 4, 1994	207

== Merchandise ==
In 1994, the tie-in video game Double Dragon V: The Shadow Falls was developed by Leland Interactive Media and published by Tradewest. The game was first ported to the Super NES, then it had a North America-only release for the Genesis, and the final port is the Jaguar which is the only console to have a Japan release of the game. Out of all three fighting game spin-offs of Double Dragon, this is the first and only game to receive criticism.

Tyco Toys produced a set of action figures. The figures included: Billy Lee, Jimmy Lee, Blaster, Vortex, Shadow Master, Sickle, and Trigger Happy. Three vehicles were also made: The (Dragon) Cycle, (Dragon) Cruiser, and Shadow Raven.

== Home media ==
=== United States ===
In 1994, Buena Vista Home Video through the DIC Toon-Time Video label released three VHS tapes of the series. The Legend Begins and Deadly Mutants, released on June 7, 1994, contained "The Shadow Falls" and "The Legend Continues", and "The Price of Oblivion" and "Judgement Day" respectively, while "The Shield of the Shadow Khan", released on November 11, featured the episodes "Shadow Khan", "Shadow Claw" and "Doom Claw" edited into a Feature-Length format.

Invincible Pictures released Double Dragon: The Animated Series on DVD in Region 1 for the very first time in the country in August 2019.

Discotek Media released Double Dragon on Blu-ray in May 2022.

=== United Kingdom ===
In June 2004, Anchor Bay UK released a single DVD containing four episodes.

Avenue Entertainment also released two DVDs containing two episodes each in July 2005.
