= Gigandes =

1989 video game

- Developer: East Technology
- Publisher: East Technology
- Platform: Arcade
- Release: 1990
- Genre: Shoot 'em up
- Modes: Single-player, multiplayer

Gigandes (ギガンデス) is a horizontal scrolling shooter video game developed and published by East Technology for arcades. Spanning eight stages, the player's ship kept all of its weapon power-ups if they lost a life, but would promptly lose the power-ups and items once they started the next stage.

== Story ==
In a future setting, the dimensional, suggestively demonic, creature and title character Gigandes suddenly awakens. Residing deep below the Earth's surface, it calls its own worshippers and space force from other galaxies to the Milky Way in order to conquer mankind. Earth's defenses constructs the Round-37, a small but powerful space fighter with the intent of stopping Gigandes and its evil plans, combatting its forces and influences on Earth and in space.

== Gameplay ==
The Round-37 had a four-way weapon system: players equipped weapons on either the top, bottom, back or front of the ship by collecting weapons depending on the direction the ship approaches the item in. The player also had full control over the direction of the ship, allowing the ship to not only collect weapons in a desired direction but also fire in different directions. However, the ship could only equip two of the same weapons at a time. Players had to fight through eight long stages leading up to a boss battle at the end of each one. If the players lost a life during a stage, they would keep all the weapons they collected on the level, but once they beat the level they start the next one with default weaponry.
