= Yoshihisa Kishimoto =

Japanese video game designer (1961–2026)

Yoshihisa Kishimoto (岸本 良久, Kishimoto Yoshihisa; September 17, 1961 – April 2, 2026) was a Japanese video game designer known primarily for his involvement with Technōs Japan. He was best known for his work on beat 'em up games as the original creator of the Kunio-kun and Double Dragon game franchises, having worked on the original arcade and NES installments in both series. While not the first side-scrolling martial arts action games, as they were predated by Kung-Fu Master, they established the general template and conventions used by the beat 'em up genre since the late 1980s. Because of this, he has sometimes been referred to as the grandfather of the beat 'em up genre. Before his death, he was the President and Representative Director of the game company Plophet.

== Life and career ==
In his teenage years as a high school student, he used to regularly get into fights on a daily basis, which was partly triggered by a break-up with a girl who dumped him. Kishimoto was also a fan of Bruce Lee's Hong Kong martial arts films, particularly Enter the Dragon (1973). These were formative influences that would later form the basis for his beat 'em up games Kunio-kun and Double Dragon.

Kishimoto began his video game designing career in the early 1980s after being employed by Data East, where he worked on the arcade laserdisc video games Cobra Command, also known as Thunder Storm, and Road Blaster. After leaving Data East, Kishimoto was employed by Technos Japan Corp. During his time in the company, he worked on the video games Nekketsu Kōha Kunio-kun, released in an altered form outside Japan under the title Renegade, and Double Dragon. Both Kunio-kun and Double Dragon went on to become the main game franchises of Technos and helped established the side-scrolling beat-'em-up game genre, known as belt scroll action game genre in Japan.

After leaving Technos during the 1990s, Kishimoto worked as a freelance game designer and producer for various game companies while working under the trade name Plophet. In 2000, he began working as a game developer for the "Plus e" platform, a computer terminal distributed to family restaurants in Japan. During his freelance career, he also acted as producer for budget games released in Japan, such as The Dungeon RPG for the PlayStation and Rogue: Hearts Dungeon for the PlayStation 2.

On April 1, 2010, Kishimoto founded Plophet Co., Ltd., a self-employed company named after the trade name he used as a freelancer. He served as a creative consultant for sequels to Technos' former IPs, such as Double Dragon Neon and River City Ransom: Underground.

Kishimoto died from coronary heart disease on April 2, 2026, at the age of 64. His death was announced by his son, Ryūbo.

== Works ==
- Pro Soccer (1982, arcade) – Sub-director
- Cobra Command (1984, Laserdisc) – Director
- Road Blaster (1984, Laserdisc) – Director
- Renegade (1986, arcade) – Director
- Renegade (1987, NES) – Director
- Double Dragon (1987, arcade) – Director
- Super Dodge Ball (1987, arcade) – Director
- Double Dragon (1988, NES) – Director
- China Gate (1988, arcade) – Director
- V'Ball (1988, arcade) – Director
- Double Dragon II: The Revenge (1988, arcade) – Director
- WWF Superstars (1989, arcade) – Director
- Super Spike V'Ball (1989, NES) – Production Manager
- Double Dragon II: The Revenge (1989, NES) – Producer
- Blockout (1989, arcade) – Producer
- Double Dragon III: The Sacred Stones (1991, NES) – Director
- WWF Wrestlefest (1991, arcade) – Director
- Sugoro Quest: The Quest of Dice Heros [sic] (1991, Famicom) – Producer
- Shodai Nekketsu Kōha Kunio-kun (1992, Super Famicom) – Producer
- Super Bowling (1992, Super NES) – Producer
- Super Double Dragon (1992, Super NES) – Direct Support
- The Combatribes (1992, Super NES) – Producer
- Shin Nekketsu Kōha: Kunio-tachi no Banka (1994, Super Famicom) – Director
- Sugoro Quest ++: Dicenics (1994, Super Famicom) – Producer
- Othello World 2:Yume to Michi e no Chōsen (1995, PlayStation) – Producer
- Chō Aniki: Kyūkyoku Muteki Ginga Saikyō Otoko (1995, PlayStation) – Producer
- Chō Aniki: Kyūkyoku... Otoko no Gyakushū (1996, Sega Saturn) – Producer
- Slam Dragon (1996, PlayStation) – Producer
- Cowboy Bebop (1998, PlayStation) – Producer
- Gunya Gunya (1999, PC) – Producer
- Simple 1500 Series Vol. 28: The Dungeon RPG (2000, PlayStation) – Development Producer and Director
- Bau Nyā Chū (2000, PC) – Producer
- Rogue Hearts Dungeon (2007, PlayStation 2) - Producer (as D-DRAGON)
- River City Ransom: Underground (2014, PC, Mac) – Creative Consultant
- Double Dragon IV (2017, PlayStation 4, PC, Switch) – Director

== Sources ==
- Gorges, Florent (March 2009). "La Naissance de Kunio Kun et Double Dragon". Pix'n Love (in French) (#07). Edition Pix'n Love: 34–49. ISBN 978-2-918272-00-7. Archived from the original on June 5, 2011.
- Gorges, Florent (June 2009). "Thunder Storm/Road Blaster". Pix'n Love (in French) (#08). Edition Pix'n Love: 50–55. ISBN 978-2-918272-04-5. Archived from the original on August 4, 2011.
