= Double Dragon (film) =

1994 American martial arts film

- Theatrical release poster
- Directed by: James Yukich
- Screenplay by: Michael Davis; Peter Gould
- Story by: Paul Dini; Neal Shusterman
- Based on: Double Dragon by Technōs Japan
- Produced by: Sunil R. Shah; Ash R. Shah; Alan Schechter; Jane Hamsher; Don Murphy
- Starring: Robert Patrick; Mark Dacascos; Scott Wolf; Julia Nickson; Alyssa Milano
- Cinematography: Gary B. Kibbe
- Edited by: Florent Retz
- Music by: Jay Ferguson; Tolga Katas
- Production companies: Imperial Entertainment Group; Scanbox
- Distributed by: Gramercy Pictures (through Universal Pictures)
- Release date: November 4, 1994
- Running time: 95 minutes
- Country: United States
- Language: English
- Budget: $7.8 million
- Box office: $4.2 million (est.)

Double Dragon also titled fully as Double Dragon: The Power of the Medallion is a 1994 American martial arts film, based on the video game series Double Dragon.

The film stars Mark Dacascos and Scott Wolf as brothers Jimmy and Billy Lee, with Alyssa Milano as Marian Delario and Robert Patrick as antagonist Koga Shuko. The plot takes place in an earthquake-crippled Los Angeles in 2007; the city is styled as a mix between a post-apocalyptic and 80s/90s punk environment. It failed both critically and financially, receiving generally negative reviews. While its special effects and action sequences were generally thought to be decent, its writing and performances were generally criticized.

== Plot ==
A gigantic earthquake destroys southern California, greatly altering its landscape and leaving Los Angeles and dystopia area of renamed "New Angeles", in shambles after the federal government fails to help restore order or rebuild.

Seven years later, New Angeles is partially flooded, wracked by constant aftershocks, and plagued by smog and acid rain.

Koga Shuko, a crime lord and businessman, explains to his underlings about a powerful, magic medallion called the Double Dragon, which has been split into two pieces. He obtains one half and orders his henchmen to find the other for him.

Teenage brothers Billy and Jimmy Lee, and their guardian/adoptive mother Satori Imada head home after citywide curfew from a martial arts tournament. On their way, they are accosted by gang members, who rule the streets after dark due to an uneasy pact made with the police department seven years earlier to keep them from running amok during the day. They escape with help from the Power Corps, a group of vigilante freedom fighters headed by their friend Marian Delario, daughter of the police chief. Unfortunately, Bo Abobo, a gang leader, discovers Satori holds the second medallion half and reports this to Shuko. For his failure in securing it, he is mutated into a hulking giant.

At their abandoned theater home, Satori explains to a skeptical Billy and Jimmy about the Double Dragon and how their piece must be protected, and she places it in the care of Billy. Shuko, with his henchmen in tow, pays the Lees a visit, intent on taking the other half. He reveals the ability of his medallion, the power of the soul, which gives the user the power of possession and a shadow form, by temporarily possessing Satori. Billy and Jimmy successfully incapacitate Abobo, but Shuko has the place doused in gasoline and lit on fire. Satori sacrifices herself so the brothers can escape with the Dragon.

Unable to find the brothers on his own, Shuko unites and takes over the gangs by displaying his power and sends them after the Lees. Billy and Jimmy narrowly get away, and seek refuge in the Power Corps hideout. Marian agrees to help them, using this as an opportunity to get rid of the gangs once and for all, and the three of them decide to go to Shuko's office building to steal his medallion. They ultimately fail and are forced to flee, and Jimmy is captured in the process.

Billy and Marian return to the Power Corps base, and lament about how none of them have been able to figure out how to use their Dragon piece. Marian points out a discovery they made that the wearer of the medallion is immune to the powers of its counterpart, meaning Shuko is not able to possess him as long as he has it. Suddenly, the gangs attack the hideout. In the mêlée, Jimmy reappears. Billy is elated; however, Jimmy is merely being controlled by Shuko as he tries to pummel his brother into submission. Billy then accidentally activates his medallion's ability, which is the power of the body and effectively makes him invulnerable to harm. Knowing this, Shuko threatens to kill Jimmy instead. This doesn't succeed either, so he releases Jimmy to distract Billy long enough to get the medallion.

Shuko succeeds in uniting the halves and turns into a pair of shadow warriors with katanas that disintegrate anything they slice through. The Lee brothers fight, but cannot beat him. Abobo, who had previously been taken prisoner and since reformed, reveals to Marian that Shuko's weakness is light. Marian reactivates the hideout's generator, and the shadow warriors are rendered powerless. Billy and Jimmy attack, forcefully recombining the shadows into Shuko, and acquire the Double Dragon halves. They combine the two pieces, granting them matching uniforms and the medallion powers, and they briefly see a vision of Satori's spirit as she gives them encouraging words. The brothers pummel Shuko, and Jimmy possesses him to make him do embarrassing things. During this time, Marian's father arrives to bring Shuko to justice and to take care of the gangs once and for all. Jimmy has Shuko write a check to the police department for $129 million before encouraging the police chief to arrest him.

Shuko is sent to jail, the police department has renewed strength to fight the gangs instead of compromising with them, and Billy and Jimmy can now keep both halves of the Double Dragon safe.

== Cast ==
- Scott Wolf as Billy Lee, the younger Lee brother. Wears a blue outfit in the end. Originally the Player 1 character in the video games.
- Mark Dacascos as Jimmy Lee, the elder Lee brother. Wears a red outfit in the end. Originally the Player 2 character in the video games.
- Alyssa Milano as Marian Delario, the leader of the Power Corps. Originally the kidnapped woman in the arcade game, the film version of Marian is a more active heroine compared to her video game counterpart.
- Robert Patrick as Victor Guisman / Koga Shuko, a businessman and former crime lord seeking to possess both halves of the Double Dragon medallion. Shuko was a new villain created for the movie, although his character was later adapted as the final boss in the 1995 Double Dragon fighting game based on the film.
- Julia Nickson as Satori Imada, the adoptive mother/guardian of Billy and Jimmy.
- Leon Russom as Chief Delario, Chief of the New Angeles Police corps and the father of Marian and Marc Delario.
- Kristina Wagner as Linda Lash, Shuko's henchwoman. Linda was originally an enemy character from the video game.
- Nils Allen Stewart as Bo Abobo, the leader of a street gang known as Mohawks. Abobo was another enemy character from the video game.
- Henry Kingi plays the mutated Bo Abobo during the later part of the film, who reforms and tries to befriend the Lee brothers and Marian at the end.
- George Hamilton appears as an anchorman.
- Vanna White appears as an anchorwoman.
- Andy Dick appeared as a weatherman who deals with the "fogcast", giving warnings over (implied acidic and radioactive) black rain.
- Cory Milano as Marc Delario, Marian's younger brother.
- Jeff Imada as Huey, Koga Shuko's henchman and bodyguard and part of the duo Huey and Lewis which is a reference to 1980s rock band Huey Lewis and the News.
- Al Leong as Lewis, another Koga Shuko's henchman and bodyguard and the second part of the duo Huey and Lewis.

== Production ==
First-time director Jim Yukich summarized his approach to the film: "Our characters are like normal kids - three kids on an adventure, so we didn't want to make something that kids would almost be too afraid to see. ... I'd like to make it in a funnier, light-hearted vein".

The boat chase sequence was filmed on the Cuyahoga River in Northeast Ohio, and climaxes with an explosion which used 700 gallons of gasoline combined with 200 gallons of alcohol. Though warnings were broadcast on several news channels the previous night, the explosion caused residents of the nearby city to panic, leading to 210 phone calls to emergency services over ten minutes.

== Reception ==
=== Critical reception ===
Reviews by critics were unfavorable. The Washington Post called it "clumsily paced" and "amateurishly acted" by kids "so upbeat they might have escaped from a road tour of Annie", although the amalgamated metropolitan backdrop of New Angeles is called "imaginative". Writing for The New York Times, Stephen Holden called it "a movie of frantic action and clever special effects" with "jumpy nonstop energy that overrides the script's incongruities and the amateurish performances". Reviewbiquity gave the film one out of five stars, stating the movie "won't satisfy even the most fervent of fans". On review aggregate website Rotten Tomatoes, it received a negative score of 12% from 17 reviews, with the consensus: "Double Dragon's clever use of special effects cannot mask the film's overly simplistic storyline and cheesy dialogue." Audiences polled by CinemaScore gave the film a rare average grade of "F" on an A+ to F scale.

In 2009, Time listed the film on their list of top ten worst video game movies.

=== Box office ===
According to Box Office Mojo, the film grossed $1,376,561 domestically in its opening weekend at 1,087 theaters in the United States and Canada. It grossed $2,341,309 during its North American theatrical run. The film sold approximately 576,000 tickets in the United States.

In Europe, the film sold 122,784 tickets in France, 126,676 tickets in Germany, and at least 5,431 tickets in Spain, equivalent to an estimated gross revenue of approximately €1,327,004 ($1,780,654). In South Korea, the film released in 1998 and sold 7,179 tickets in Seoul City, equivalent to an estimated gross revenue of approximately ₩43,074,000 ($30,736). This brings the film's estimated worldwide total gross to approximately $4,152,699.

=== Legacy ===
Plot and visual elements of the film were reused in the 1995 fighting game version of Double Dragon produced by Technos Japan. This includes the transformation that the Lee brothers go through during the film's climax, which appear in the game, as a special move for both characters and the use of footage of the film in the game's introduction and Marian's stage.

== Soundtrack ==
The soundtrack features Coolio, The Farm and Crystal Waters.

== Home video ==
Universal released the film on VHS and Laserdisc in April 1995 in the United States, while CFP released the film on video in Canada. GoodTimes Entertainment made another VHS in late 1997, released it on DVD in 2001, and another DVD on August 31, 2004. In 2014, DigiDreams released the film on Blu-ray in Germany.

MVD Entertainment Group (under license from rights holder Imperial Entertainment Group) released the film on a Blu-ray/DVD combo pack in 2019. This Blu-ray release has grossed over $1.3 million in American sales, as of 2020.

== See also ==
- List of films based on video games
