= Double Dragon II: The Revenge (NES video game) =

1989 video game

- North American NES box art
- Developer: Technōs Japan
- Publishers: NES: JP: Technōs Japan; NA/PAL: Acclaim Entertainment; Super CD-ROM²; Naxat Soft
- Director: Hiroyuki Sekimoto
- Artists: Koji Ogata; Nobuyuki Sawada
- Composer: Kazunaka Yamane
- Series: Double Dragon
- Platforms: NES, PC Engine Super CD-ROM²
- Release: NES: JP: December 22, 1989; NA: January 1990; PAL: 1990; Super CD-ROM²: JP: March 12, 1993
- Genre: Beat 'em up
- Modes: Single-player, multiplayer

Double Dragon II: The Revenge (Note: Japanese: ダブルドラゴンII ザ・リベンジ, Hepburn: Daburu Doragon II: Za Ribenji) is a 1989 beat 'em up video game developed and published by Technōs Japan for the Nintendo Entertainment System. It is the second Double Dragon game for the NES, and was published in North America by Acclaim Entertainment, who took over publishing duties from Tradewest. Acclaim also published it in PAL regions.

The game shares its title with the 1988 arcade sequel to the original Double Dragon, using the same promotional artwork for its packaging and having a similar plot, but the content of the two games are otherwise drastically different. The NES version of Double Dragon II was directed by Hiroyuki Sekimoto (co-director of River City Ransom), with the arcade version's director Yoshihisa Kishimoto taking a supervisory role in the game's development.

Players control Billy and Jimmy Lee, who are on a mission to avenge the death of Billy's girlfriend Marian after she is killed during an attack by the Shadow Warriors (an unnamed group in the Japanese version). While this version ignores the plot twist of the first NES game, in which Jimmy Lee turns out to be the final boss (likely due to the inclusion of 2-players co-operative play), it also replaced Willy, the gun-toting gang leader from the arcade version, with a nameless martial artist who wields supernatural abilities as the game's ultimate antagonist. The game contains nine stages and three difficulty levels; only by choosing the hardest level can the player access all nine stages and see the true ending.

According to a North American television commercial by the game's publisher, Acclaim, the NES version of Double Dragon II became a million seller soon after its release.

== Gameplay ==
Unlike the first NES game, Double Dragon II can be played by up to two players simultaneously. The game offers three difficulty levels and two modes of play, the latter differing only in whether or not the two players can hurt each other with their attacks.

The structure of the game is completely different. While the first stage loosely resembles the one from the arcade version, the level designs deviate completely from Mission 2 and onward, with scenes set in a variety of new locations such as the interior of a moving helicopter, an undersea base and a series of trap rooms. There are a total of nine stages in the NES version. Before each stage, a cut-scene is shown (similar to the ones in the NES version of Ninja Gaiden) consisting of still imagery and text which provides the setting of the stage. The enemy characters are roughly based on the ones featured in the arcade version, but some of them carry different weapons or have new fighting techniques, such as Rowper's ability to throw boomerangs at the player. Besides the final boss, the other enemy characters that are introduced in this version are the "Right Arm men" (characters based on the villain Jeff from the arcade editions of the first two Double Dragon games) that serve as recurring sub-bosses from Mission 2 and onward, and the ninjas that appear at the end of Mission 2 and later on in Mission 8.

The game retains the directional-based combat system from the arcade version. Unlike the first NES game, the player has full access to Billy or Jimmy's entire repertoire of moves from the beginning. In addition to the Cyclone Spin Kick introduced in the arcade version, two additional special moves were added to the player's set of techniques, the Hyper Uppercut and the Flying Knee Kick. These two moves are performed while the player's character is crouching, which is only possible after landing from a jump or recovering from a fall.

As in the NES release of Double Dragon, no more than two enemy characters will confront the players at any given time, and they will both be the same type of enemy. Melee weapons have been changed slightly to include chain whips, knives, steel pipes, and grenades. Whenever the players defeat one group of enemies, all weapons on the screen disappear, including any that the players are holding.

At the easiest difficulty level, the game ends after the third stage. The intermediate level allows players to complete all but the ninth and final stage; the hardest level grants access to all stages and the confrontation with the final boss.

== Releases ==
=== Famicom/NES ===
The Family Computer version has a few differences compared to its NES counterpart besides the language change. Both versions feature a choice of three difficulty settings at the start of the game. However, the Famicom version allows the entire game to be played on any difficulty setting, whereas the NES version restricts the game's length based on the level chosen. The easy and medium settings end the game after three and eight stages, respectively, while the ninth and final stage can only be reached at the hardest setting. The difficulty levels are also balanced differently in the Famicom version, with the platforming sessions in Mission 6 being easier on the Easy and Normal setting than they were on the equivalent settings in the NES version, while enemies have more health on the hardest setting. The NES version requires the player to input a cheat code at the game over screen to continue the game at the previous stage, while the Famicom version gives this option as a standard feature.

=== PC Engine ===
The PC Engine version of Double Dragon II: The Revenge, released in Super CD-ROM² format, was published by Naxat Soft on March 12, 1993 exclusively in Japan. The PC Engine version is based on the NES version of the game instead of the arcade one. The story sequences from the NES version were remade and are now animated, with voice acting featuring Makoto Horikawa as Billy, Nobutoshi Hayashi as Jimmy, and Hiroko Emori as Marian.

There are other changes to the game as well. The combat mechanics have been revamped slightly (for example, the player can now damage enemies by throwing one of their comrades at them and certain enemy characters can now grab Billy or Jimmy from behind like in the arcade version), the weapons usable by players are different (which now consists of items from the arcade version such as wooden boxes, shovels, and wrecking balls, and like the arcade game, can also be used for an entire stage, rather than for only one battle at a time), the graphics have been remade completely and the soundtrack consist almost entirely of new music (with the exception of the final boss theme and the closing credits theme). Some of the levels designs have been greatly altered and the order of Mission 4 and 5 (the Undersea Base and the Forest of Death) were switched. The PC Engine version allows the player to reach the final stage in any of the three difficulty settings, making the game closer to the Japanese Famicom version in this regard than its western NES counterpart. The ending changes depending on the difficulty setting, with the full ending shown only when the player completes the hardest setting.

=== Re-releases ===
The NES version of Double Dragon II was re-released in North America as a downloadable title on the Virtual Console for the Wii, Nintendo 3DS and Wii U. It was also re-released worldwide as part of the Nintendo Classics service on June 12, 2019.

== Soundtrack ==
A soundtrack, simply titled Double Dragon II: The Revenge, was published in Japan by Meldac and released on March 10, 1990. The soundtrack features arranged versions of the music from the NES version (originally composed by Kazunaka Yamane) composed by Kazuhiro Hara and Nobuhito Tanahashi. The soundtrack also features a vocal J-pop rendition of the Double Dragon opening theme performed by Manami Morozumi titled "Dead or Alive". Its catalog number is MECG-28001. An excerpt from the arcade soundtrack was included on the Sinclair User cover tape.

1. Dead or Alive (Opening Theme) - Female Vocal Version
2. "The Vengeful Demon Has Began to Move" (Mission 1) (動き出した復讐鬼, Ugokidashita Fukushū Oni)
3. "A Quiet Pursuit" (Mission 2) (静かなる追跡, Shizukanaru Tsuiseki)
4. "Tension at the Night Sky" (Mission 3) (緊迫の夜空, Kinpaku no Yozora)
5. "A Pleasant Advance to the Morning Glow" (Mission 4) (朝焼けの快進撃, Asayake no Kaishingeki)
6. "Escape to the Forest" (Mission 5) (森を抜けて, Mori o Nukete)
7. "Wicked God" (Mission 6) (邪神, Jashin)
8. "Breaking the Barrier" (Mission 7) (難関突破, Nankan Toppa)
9. "Enter to the Enemy's Base (Mission 8) (敵基地を行く, Teki Kichi o Iku)
10. "Roar of the Twin Dragons" (Fight of Fate) (双龍の雄叫び, Sōryū no Otakebi)
11. "Miracle of the Twin Dragons" (After the Battle) (双龍の奇跡, Sōryū no Kiseki)
12. "Sweet Memories" (Ending Theme) (懐かしき思い出, Natsukashiki Omoide)
13. "Dead or Alive" (Edit Version)
