= Double Dragon Neon =

2012 beat 'em up video game

- Promotional artwork featuring logo and characters.
- Developers: WayForward Technologies (PS3, X360, Switch); Abstraction Games (PC)
- Publisher: Majesco; Midnight City (PC): JP: Arc System Works
- Director: Sean Velasco
- Producer: Jeff Pomegranate
- Designers: Michael Herbster; Aaron Davis; Barrett Velia
- Programmers: Shane Calimlim; Ian Flood
- Artists: Matt Bozon; Paul Castillo; Gonzalo Ordóñez
- Composer: Jake Kaufman
- Series: Double Dragon
- Platforms: PlayStation 3 (PlayStation Network); Xbox 360 (Xbox Live Arcade); Microsoft Windows; Nintendo Switch
- Release: PlayStation 3 (PSN): NA: September 11, 2012; EU: September 20, 2012; JP: December 12, 2013; Xbox 360 (XBLA): WW: September 12, 2012; Microsoft Windows: WW: February 6, 2014; Nintendo Switch: WW: December 21, 2020
- Genre: Beat 'em up
- Modes: Single-player, multiplayer

Double Dragon Neon is a 2012 beat 'em up video game in the Double Dragon series. It was developed by WayForward Technologies under license from Million, which owned the rights to the franchise at the time. Series creator Yoshihisa Kishimoto was consulted during the game's development, and described Neon as "a very western adaptation" with certain mechanics taken from the previous games, and a "mood and feel" that reminded him of the original arcade game.

It was published by Majesco internationally and by Arc System Works in Japan. The game was the first original Double Dragon title since the closure of Technōs Japan in 1996, and the only original title during the Million era. Arc Systems bought out the rights to the whole franchise from Million in 2015 for their own revival.

== Gameplay ==
As with previous installments of the series, the player takes control of martial artists Billy Lee (Player 1) and Jimmy Lee (Player 2) in their fight to rescue Marian from the Shadow Warriors gang, this time led by the super-lich Skullmageddon. The journey starts on the city streets and progresses through an outer-space dojo, Asian countryside, a genetics lab, and a graveyard before concluding at Skullmageddon's palace.

In addition to the standard punch, kick, and jump buttons and a designated run button, the player now has an evade button for dodging attacks. If the player times their evasion right so as to perfectly dodge an enemy attack, they will "Gleam" by briefly glowing red, during which time their attacks will be more powerful. The player can collect life-replenishing sodas, money to buy items from shops, and special mixtapes that can be equipped from a pause menu. Two different tapes can be equipped at once: one to grant the brothers a powerful attack that consumes a separate energy meter, and one to alter their statistics and grant special effects (such as making it easier to stun enemies or healing HP with every connecting blow). By collecting multiple copies of a tape, its effect gradually increases until it reaches a maximum capacity. Each tape's maximum capacity can be increased further by visiting a "Tapesmith" and paying him Mythril, which is obtained from defeated bosses.

In a two-player game, both Billy and Jimmy can utilize a special "high-five" technique to split and share their life meters to an equal amount, "psych" the other one out to harm them or make them fall over, or to instantly trigger a Gleam effect. If one player is defeated in battle, the other player has a limited time to revive him before a life is deducted (unless both players are defeated together). When one player is completely out of lives, he can steal one from the other player if he has at least two left.

== Development ==
Yoshihisa Kishimoto, designer of the original two Double Dragon arcade games, served as a consultant during the development of Neon, offering feedback on character designs and gameplay elements.

Double Dragon Neon was released in North America on September 11, 2012, in Europe on September 20, and in Japan on December 12, 2013, on PlayStation 3 via the PlayStation Network, and worldwide on September 12 on Xbox 360 via Xbox Live Arcade, to coincide with the 25th anniversary of the series. The game's dialogue and graphical style is heavily 80s-inspired, and features a soundtrack composed by Jake Kaufman, inspired by the original Double Dragon as well as 80's pop music and arcade game soundtracks.

This is also the first commercially released Double Dragon game to use 3D graphics rendered with polygon-based models. The game has been released for Microsoft Windows on February 6, 2014. Ported by Abstraction Games, the port features online multiplayer. Skullmaggedon along with the Double Dragon Neon incarnations of Billy, Jimmy and Marian would later cameo as shopkeepers for WayForward's River City Girls (a spin-off game based on the Kunio-kun property by Technos Japan), with the latter becoming a playable character in the game's sequel, River City Girls 2. Billy and Jimmy would later become playable in River City Girls 2 as well, albeit via downloadable content.

A port for Nintendo Switch was released on December 21, 2020.

== Reception ==
Reception

Aggregate score
Aggregator	Score
Metacritic	PS3: 71/100; X360: 66/100; NS: 76/100

Review scores
Publication	Score
Edge	7/10
Electronic Gaming Monthly	90/100
Eurogamer	7/10
G4	4/5
Game Informer	8.25/10
GameRevolution	2/5
GameSpot	7/10
IGN	3/10
Joystiq	4.5/5
PlayStation Official Magazine – Australia	60%
Official U.S. PlayStation Magazine	8/10
Official Xbox Magazine (US)	6.5/10
Play	37%

Double Dragon Neon received mixed reviews. Electronic Gaming Monthly rated the game a 90/100, praising the '80s feel, humor and the gameplay.

GameSpot rated it a 7/10 and praised the game for its humor and rewarding combat system.
