= Double Dragon (1995 video game) =

1995 video game

- Arcade flyer
- Developer: Technōs Japan (Note: Ported to PlayStation by Urban Plant.)
- Publishers: SNK (Note: PlayStation Network release was published by HAMSTER Corporation in Japan and by MonkeyPaw Games in North America.); Technōs Japan (NGCD, PS)
- Producer: Kazuyuki Kurata
- Designers: Minoru Yamaguchi; Muneki Ebinuma
- Programmers: Naoki Kashiwabara; Shinji Hirao; Tadamichi Obinata
- Artists: Akiko Maruyama; Chihiro Kushibe; Fujimi Ōnishi
- Composers: Chiaki Iizuka; Fumio Suzuki; Kiyomi Kataoka
- Series: Double Dragon
- Platforms: Arcade, Neo Geo AES, Neo Geo CD, PlayStation
- Release: February 1995: Arcade; JP: February 1995; NA: March 1995 Neo Geo AES; NA/JP: 31 March 1995 Neo Geo CD; JP: 2 June 1995; NA: October 1996 PlayStation; JP: 26 April 1996
- Genre: Fighting
- Modes: Single-player, multiplayer
- Arcade system: Neo Geo MVS

Double Dragon, (Note: Japanese: ダブルドラゴン, Hepburn: Daburu Doragon) commonly known as Double Dragon '95, is a 1995 fighting video game spin-off of the Double Dragon series developed and published by Technōs Japan. It is based on the 1994 film, which in turn was based on the video game series of the same name. It was originally released for the Neo Geo (in AES and MVS formats) and later released for the Neo Geo CD and PlayStation (the latter ported by Urban Plant). The game was also made available for PlayStation Network in Japan in 2011 and in North America in 2014. It was Technōs Japan's last Double Dragon game before the company went out of business, and the fourth and final Double Dragon game released in arcades.

== Gameplay ==
Gameplay screenshot, showcasing a match between Billy Lee and Rebecca

The game plays like a conventional one-on-one fighting game. One of the unique aspects of Double Dragon is the lack of specific punch and kick buttons like other fighting games. Instead, there are four attack buttons of varying strength and speed, which can perform punches or kicks depending on the character's position. The player's character and his or her opponent have a super move meter called the "charge meter", overlaid over the character's health gauge. The less health the character has, the quicker it will fill up. "Charge moves" are usually performed by executing the command of a regular special move and pressing two attack buttons simultaneously at the end instead of just one. Other techniques available in the game include dashes, air guards, air throws, and down attacks (which allows characters to jump over and attack their opponent while they are momentarily unconscious on the ground).

In single-player mode, the player competes against all 10 of the playable fighters, including a clone of their own character. After all 10 of the default fighters are defeated, the player will face Shuko's bodyguard Duke before challenging Shuko himself. In the console versions of the game, Duke and Shuko are both playable via a cheat code.

== Plot and characters ==
Billy and Jimmy Lee return to their childhood city after receiving a letter from their master. The city has changed drastically in the ten years since the brothers left, becoming a haven for street gangs known as Bloody Town after it has fallen under the control of the crime boss Koga Shuko. Shuko is hosting a martial arts tournament in order to recruit new members into his organization, but also to lure the Lee brothers in bringing him one half of the titular Double Dragon medallion. Shuko is in possession of the other half. Whoever possesses both halves of the Double Dragon medallion will acquire unlimited powers.

The character roster includes ten immediately playable fighters and two boss characters. Billy and Jimmy Lee both fight using the fictional Sou-Setsu-Ken martial arts style, with Billy having the faster techniques, while Jimmy is stronger. The twin brothers also have the ability to transform into an alternate form as a super move, altering their move lists. The other eight fighters are Marian, a female gang leader and childhood friend of the Lee brothers; Abobo, a strongman employed by Shuko; Burnov, a former wrestler with a rivalry against Abobo; Eddie, a kickboxer; Amon, a ninja; Cheng-Fu, a master of the drunken fist; Dulton, a street fighter; and Rebecca, a master of the dual tonfa.

The characters and settings are inspired by the Double Dragon film, which features prominently in the game's intro. This includes the appearances of a submerged Hollywood Sign, the appearance of the Dragon Wagon in Billy's stage, the Lee brothers' transformation technique, Marian's depiction as a gang leader, and the inclusion of Koga Shuko as the game's final opponent. However, the characters are depicted in a more anime-like style and only five of the game's twelve fighters are actually featured in the movie; Burnov and Duke are from previous Double Dragon games and the rest are new characters created specifically for this game.

== Reception ==
Reception

Review scores
Publication	Score
AllGame	(AES) 3.5/5
Consoles +	(PS) 91%
Famitsu	6/10, 4/10, 5/10, 6/10 (PS)
GamePro	(AES) 11.5/20
Mega Fun	(AES) 69%
Next Generation	(AES) 1/5
Pocket Gamer	(PSN) 3/5
Ação Games	(NGCD) 5/5
Digitally Downloaded	(PSN) 3/5
The Electric Playground	(NGCD) 8.5/10
Joypad	(PS1) 1/5
MAN!AC	(AES) 55%
Maximum	(NGCD) 2/5
Play Time	(AES) 73%
Player One	(AES) 80%
Superjuegos	(NGCD) 92/100
Última Generación	(NGCD) 70/100
Video Games	(AES) 62%
X Gen	(NGCD) 74/100

In Japan, Game Machine listed Double Dragon for Neo Geo as the thirteenth most popular arcade game of April 1995. According to Famitsu, the Neo Geo CD version sold over 3,851 copies in its first week on the market.

The Neo Geo AES version was met with mixed reception from critics, although Andreas Knauf of German magazine MAN!AC regarded it to be better than Double Dragon V: The Shadow Falls on Super Nintendo. AllGame's Kyle Knight reviewed the Neo Geo AES version and praised the interactive stages, adequate character animations, sound design and controls but criticized the announcer's voice and low number of playable fighters. Nevertheless, Knight regarded it as "a surprisingly solid fighting game which has the dubious honor of being based on the Double Dragon movie." GamePro's The Axe Grinder gave the AES version a negative review. He praised the charge meter and the accuracy of the controls, but criticized the "remarkably subdued graphics" and concluded, "Normally, Double Dragon would just be average, but the silly aspects (the announcer) and goofy fighters (with some very standard moves) get in the way." Next Generation reviewed the AES version, rating it one star out of five, stating that "The template from which this one came should certainly be retired, but in the meantime Double Dragon is another in a long line of mediocre fighters for all those fighter junkies who somehow have made room in their heads for 50 different sets of super moves. You could do better."

The Neo Geo CD version was also met with mixed reaction from critics, with Javier S. Fernández of Última Generación criticizing its loading times. Brazilian magazine Ação Games praised the audiovisual presentation, challenge, playability and originality, though they noted that the game needed more difficult bosses and variety of attacks. The Electric Playground's Victor Lucas commended the visuals, stage design, presentation, controls and sound design, stating that "Double Dragon, despite how old fashioned the title might suggest the game to be, is really worthy of a modern video game fighting fan's attention." Maximum found the game lacked originality, had poorly defined sprites, and suffered from subpar gameplay compared to other Neo Geo CD games. They scored it two out of five stars. Superjuegos's Bruno Sol gave very high remarks to the Tetsuo Hara-esque character designs, sound design and playability, stating that "After some really regrettable episodes like Double Dragon V, Billy and Jimmy are back on the right track."

The PlayStation version was met with mixed reception as well. Consoles +'s Marc Menier and Gia To highly praised its visual presentation, audio design, longevity and playability. Pocket Gamer's Danny Russell criticized the lengthy loading times for being intrusive, regarding it to be a mediocre fighting game.

== See also ==
- Double Dragon V: The Shadow Falls, the other 1-on-1 fighting game in the series
- Voltage Fighter Gowcaizer (Technōs Japan's other Neo Geo fighting game)
- Rage of the Dragons
