= Super Double Dragon =

1992 video game

- North American cover art by Greg Winters
- Developer: Technōs Japan
- Publishers: JP: Technōs Japan; NA/EU: Tradewest
- Directors: Muneki Ebinuma; Atsuyuki Nishizawa
- Programmers: Teruhiro Maeda; Genei Fukuhara; Naritaka Nishimura
- Composer: Kazunaka Yamane
- Series: Double Dragon
- Platform: Super NES
- Release: JP: October 16, 1992; NA: October 1992; EU: September 30, 1993
- Genre: Beat 'em up
- Modes: Single-player, multiplayer

Super Double Dragon (Note: Released in Japan as Return of Double Dragon: "Sleeping Dragon" has Awoke (Note: Japanese: リターン・オブ・双截龍(ダブルドラゴン), Hepburn: Ritān Obu Daburu Doragon)) is a beat 'em up video game developed and published by Technōs Japan for the Super Nintendo Entertainment System. It was released by Tradewest in North America the same year and the PAL region in 1993. Super Double Dragon is the fourth console game in the Double Dragon series developed by Technōs Japan, following Double Dragon III: The Sacred Stones for the NES. The game did not have an arcade release and was made specifically for the home market.

In 2018, a slightly enhanced Japanese version, Return of Double Dragon, was re-released by Tommo in Japan and under its Retroism brand in North America. Despite being officially licensed, this release is only guaranteed to work on third-party hardware.

== Gameplay ==
Gameplay of Super Double Dragon

As with previous installments of the series, the player takes control of martial artists Billy and Jimmy in their fight against the Shadow Warriors gang. The objective is to proceed through each stage and defeat all enemies, including a boss. The game consists of seven stages, which includes a casino, an airport, a martial arts dojo, a fight atop a moving truck, a city slum, a forest, and the hideout of the boss.

In addition to the punch, kick, and jump buttons, the player now has a guard button for blocking attacks. If the player times the guard button right, their character can not only defend against an enemy's punch, they can also put certain enemies in an arm grab, leaving the enemy vulnerable to successive attacks. The arm grab only works on Williams, Roper, Steve, Jackson and the Chin brothers. There's also a "Dragon Power" gauge under the life gauge, which the player can fill by holding down the L or R buttons. While the gauge is filling up, the player can perform special attacks which vary depending on how much power the player has accumulated, which includes a flying hurricane kick. If the power gauge is completely filled, then the player's regular attacks will gain extra strength for a limited period.

Super Double Dragon is one of the few games in the series where the protagonists of Billy and Jimmy Lee were differentiated, not just in their in-game character designs (where the brothers were given different hair styles), but also in their fighting abilities. Particularly, the two characters have different basic punches (in Return of Double Dragon, Jimmy's roundhouse kick is also different).

== Characters ==
- Billy Lee (ビリー・リー, Birī Rī) - player 1's character. A master of Southern So-Setsu-Ken (南派双截拳, Nanha Sōsetsuken), which specializes in agility and flexibility. Billy retains his basic design from the NES versions of the previous games (red hair and blue outfit).
- Jimmy Lee (ジミー・リー, Jimī Rī) - player 2's character. A master of Northern So-Setsu-Ken (北派双截拳, Hokuha Sōsetsuken), which prioritizes strength. Jimmy now has a blond flat top hairstyle to distinguish him from Billy (in previous games, Jimmy was only depicted differently in cut-scenes and promotional art).
- Williams (ウィリアムス, Wiriamusu) and Roper (ローパー, Rōpā) - the two common enemy types in the game. Williams has wild blond hair and wears a yellow vest with camouflage pants, while Roper has black hair with a bandanna tied around his head and wears a white vest and pants. Sometimes they come armed with all sorts of weapons, which can be used by the player.
- Baker (ベイカー, Beikā) - another common enemy type who is always armed with twin dao blades. His attacks include single-sword slashes and helicopter-like spins. Unlike other enemies, he cannot be disarmed when knocked down. Also, unlike other weapons, the swords are unobtainable.
- Jeff (ジェフ, Jefu) - a recurring sub-boss who appears in the early stages. He's a palette swap of Billy Lee with darker skin and green clothing, and thus has most of the same techniques (including the hurricane kick).
- Steve (スティーブ, Sutību) - the boss of Mission 1. A suit-wearing martial arts master who specializes in kicks. Reappears as a sub-boss in subsequent stages.
- Jackson (ジャクソン, Jakuson) - the boss of Mission 2. A former heavyweight boxing champion. Reappears as a sub-boss in subsequent stages.
- Chin Ron Foo (チェン・ロン・フー, Chen Ron Fū) and Chin Ron Pyo (チェン・ロン・ピョウ, Chen Ron Pyou) - the bosses of Mission 3. Twin martial arts masters who operate a Kenpo gym in Chinatown. They have the ability to grab the player's kicks and twist his leg. Ron Foo (in the yellow vest) specializes in kicks, while Ron Pyo (in the red vest) specializes in punches. Ron Foo claims that he and his brother are the real Double Dragons.
- McGuire (マックガイア, Makkugaia) - the boss of Mission 5. A clown-like fat man who can block attacks with his stomach.
- Carlem (カーレム, Kāremu) - the boss of Mission 6. The giant gatekeeper of the enemy's hideout. His special technique is a middle kick feared by his comrades as "Death Leg".
- Duke (デューク, Dyūku) - the final boss, who uses a flashy martial arts style.

== Development ==
Muneki Ebinuma, who worked as the lead game designer of Super Double Dragon, published a commentary about his involvement in the development of the game in 2004, where he detailed his original plans for the game that he was unable to fully realize due to time constraints. The game was supposed to feature cut-scenes prior to boss battles and between stages, as well as a full ending sequence, in contrast to the lack of in-game plot in the retail release (where no explanation is given as to why Billy and Jimmy Lee are fighting the enemy). The plot would've involved Billy and Jimmy Lee investigating a criminal organization known as the Shadow Warriors following the disappearances of several local martial artists, eventually coming face to face with their leader Duke, who would've been revealed to have been a childhood friend of the Lee brothers. The character of Marian was also supposed to appear in the game as a policewoman who assisted the Lee brothers (an occupation she had in the Double Dragon comic book and animated series produced around the time). While Marian is still mentioned in the instruction manual and packaging description, she never actually appears in the retail version of the game. In addition to the cut-scenes, some of the stages were supposed to have more traps and obstacles, and there was supposed to an additional boss after defeating Duke.

Return of Double Dragon features several significant differences from Super Double Dragon: the title theme and most of the background music were shuffled around (e.g. the Mission 1 theme from Super Double Dragon is played during Mission 4 in Return of Double Dragon) and the player can perform certain actions which cannot be done in Super Double Dragon (such as retrieving a boomerang after throwing it or hitting an opponent more than once successively with the hurricane kick). The enemy placement is also different in both versions and weapons such as knives and incendiary bombs do less damage in Return of Double Dragon. Jimmy's punches are not as fast, but hit harder, and his roundhouse kick is performed faster than Billy's. There are times where enemies will randomly crouch, particularly when Billy or Jimmy try to finish a combo, which makes them dodge the attack. The higher the difficulty, enemies will do this more frequently. The final Mission also features two additional levels before the final battle. An Option Mode is included in Return of Double Dragon as well, allowing players to adjust the game's difficulty level, increase extra credits and also listen to the game's music and sound effects.

== Reception ==
Reception

Review scores
| Publication | Score |
|---|---|
| AllGame | 2.5/5 |
| Aktueller Software Markt | 8/12 |
| Consoles + | 85% |
| Computer and Video Games | 79/100 |
| GameFan | 193/200 |
| GamePro | 17.5/20 |
| Joypad | 80% |
| Nintendo Life | 6/10 |
| Nintendo Power | 13.6/20 |
| Player One | 69% |
| Super Play | 68% |
| Video Games (DE) | 53% |
| Control | 72% |
| N-Force | 70/100 |
| Power Play | 48% |
| Super Action | 90% |
| Super Pro | 61/100 |

IGN ranked the game at 92nd in their "Top 100 SNES of All Time".
