= Double Dragon II: The Revenge =

1988 video game

- Japanese arcade flyer
- Developer: Technōs Japan
- Publisher: Technōs Japan
- Designer: Yoshihisa Kishimoto
- Composer: Kazunaka Yamane
- Series: Double Dragon
- Platforms: Arcade, Amiga, Amstrad CPC, Atari ST, Commodore 64, ZX Spectrum, IBM PC, Mega Drive
- Release: November 1988: Arcade; NA: November 1988; JP: December 1988; EU: January 1989 Amiga, Atari ST, C64, CPC, ZX Spectrum; EU: December 1989 IBM PC; 1989 Mega Drive; JP: December 20, 1991
- Genre: Beat 'em up
- Modes: Single-player, multiplayer

Double Dragon II: The Revenge (Note: Japanese: 双截龍(ダブルドラゴン)II ザ・リベンジ) is a 1988 beat 'em up video game developed and published by Technōs Japan for arcades. It is the first sequel to Double Dragon, released during the previous year. The sequel involves Billy and Jimmy Lee in a mission to avenge Billy's girlfriend Marian after she is shot to death by the Black Warriors leader Willy, who is retaliating against the Lee brothers after his defeat at the end of the previous game.

Double Dragon II was initially developed as an upgrade kit for the original Double Dragon, but evolved into a stand-alone game due to an increase in memory size, resulting in the developers reusing assets for both games. A distinct version of the same name was released for the Nintendo Entertainment System.

== Gameplay ==
Arcade version screenshot

The arcade version of Double Dragon II: The Revenge begins with Marian, the damsel in distress from the original Double Dragon, being shot to death by the leader of the Black Warriors. Once again, the players assume the role of brothers Billy and Jimmy Lee, who are now tasked with the duty of avenging Marian's death. The arcade version of the game is essentially an improved version of the original title. The biggest change in the game's controls are in the replacement of the original's punch and kick buttons with two directional-based attack buttons (Left Attack and Right Attack) similar to Renegade. Pressing the attack button of the player's current direction will do a standard series of punches, while pressing the opposite attack button will perform a back kick. A few new moves are added as well, including a Hurricane Kick.

Similar to Double Dragon, the game is divided into four areas or "missions": a heliport, a lumber storehouse, a farm, and the gang's new hideout. The player must defeat a boss at the end of each mission, as well as one or more sub-bosses along the way. Many of the enemy characters from the first game return for this one, but with altered appearances and new attacks, and the variety of weapons they use has been altered. Weapons carried by enemies include shovels, knives, chain whips, and grenades; in addition, crates, logs, and steel balls can be picked up and thrown. The enemies are as follows:

- Williams: Low-ranking member of the gang, who uses knives and shovels.
- Roper: Another low-ranking member, who can also use knives and shovels and throw crates/logs/balls.
- Linda: The only female member, who uses whips, knives, and grenades. She is the only enemy who will pick up or carry a whip.
- Oharra: A head-swap of Abobo from the first game; tall, bare-chested, with a crew cut.
- Burnov: A large man in a steel mask who is the boss of the first mission. His body vanishes when he is defeated, leaving his clothes behind. Later in the game, he gains the ability to rematerialize himself and continue fighting.
- Bolo: A head-swap of Oharra, with longer hair.
- Abore: The boss of Mission 2; a large blond man in a white shirt, red pants, and sunglasses.
- Jeff: A palette-swap of Billy and Jimmy, who can perform all of their moves.
- Chin Taimei: The boss of Mission 3; an agile martial artist who fights with kali sticks, which he never drops when knocked down.
- Willy: The leader of the Black Warriors, who uses a machine gun and never drops it when knocked down.
- Doppelganger: A shadowy clone of Billy/Jimmy that the player must fight after defeating Willy in Mission 4, as the final battle of the game. He can perform all of the player's attacks, and can also drain the player's energy if he gets close enough. If two players reach the end together, they must each face their own clone.

The player has a life meter that depletes upon being hit, and a timer runs during each mission. One life is lost if either of these reaches zero, or if the player falls off the bottom of the screen or into a pit or bed of spikes.

== Ports ==
A console version was released for the Nintendo Entertainment System on January 15, 1990, developed by Technōs themselves, and published by Acclaim Entertainment, although it is a very distinct product from the arcade game. It was remade by Naxat Soft for the PC Engine in 1993, known by fans as "Double Dragon II PCE".

Virgin Mastertronic released ports of the arcade version for the ZX Spectrum, Commodore 64, IBM PC compatibles, Amiga, Amstrad CPC, and Atari ST in 1989. The computer ports were developed by Binary Design, the same studio that handled the computer ports of the first game. In 2013, the Internet Archive put the undeleted assembly sources (DRGNSRC.LZH) of the DOS version available for download.

The Mega Drive version of Double Dragon II: The Revenge was released by Palsoft exclusively in Japan on December 20, 1991. Unlike the NES version, the Mega Drive version is a straight port of the original arcade game, featuring the same stages, techniques and weapons, as well as almost every enemy character, with Jeff being the lone omission. The only significant change to the level designs was in Mission 2, which was substantially changed in order to make it a longer and more complex stage. However, the characters were redesigned to much smaller proportions and are less colorful than the ones featured in the original arcade version or even the Genesis port of the original Double Dragon by Accolade, released a year later in North America and Europe. The game has compatibility issues when played with a six-button controller, suffering from slight input lag when the players move their characters with the directional pad.

An unrelated Game Boy game was released under the Double Dragon II name in North America and Europe in 1991. It was originally released in Japan in 1990 as part of the Kunio-kun series, but the graphics, music, and storyline were changed for the English version of the game.

=== Re-releases ===
Double Dragon II was re-released in 2013 alongside the other two arcade games in a compilation titled Double Dragon Trilogy produced by DotEmu, which was released on iOS, Android and Steam platforms.

Hamster Corporation released the game as part of their Arcade Archives series for the PlayStation 4 in 2016 and Nintendo Switch in 2018.

== Reception ==
Reception

Review scores
Publication	Score			
Publication	Amiga	Arcade	Atari ST	ZX
ACE	720	Positive	725	
Crash				85%
Sinclair User				87%
The Games Machine (UK)	83%		83%	82%
Your Sinclair		8/10		77%
Commodore User		7/10		
MicroHobby (ES)				78%

In Japan, Game Machine listed Double Dragon II: The Revenge as the seventh most successful table arcade unit of March 1989.

In the United Kingdom, the game was number three on the Atari ST sales chart in early 1990. In 2013, Arcade Sushi ranked the game 9th on their list of the "10 Best Retro Beat 'Em Ups".

== Legacy ==
Double Dragon II: Wander of the Dragons is a beat 'em up loosely based on the arcade game Double Dragon II: The Revenge, developed by Korean game studio GRAVITY and published by Barunson Creative Co. Ltd. The title was first announced in 2011, but was shelved for release for two years. It was eventually released on April 5, 2013 as a digital download for the Xbox 360 via the Xbox Live Arcade service. The game was met with an overwhelmingly negative reception, and is considered one of the worst games of all time.
