= Nijiiro Dodge Ball: Otome Tachi no Seishun =

2002 video game

- Cover art
- Developer: Million Co. Ltd.
- Publisher: Atlus
- Platform: PlayStation
- Release: JP: December 12, 2002
- Genres: Sports game, social simulation
- Modes: Single-player, multiplayer

Nijiiro Dodge Ball: Otome Tachi no Seishun (Japanese: 虹色ドッジボール 乙女たちの青春; lit. 'Rainbow-colored Dodgeball: Youth of Maidens') is the second dodge ball game developed by Million and published by Atlus. The game combines elements of Super Dodge Ball with growth sim elements. Similar to Super Dodge Ball Advance, this game has no Kunio-kun characters.

A planned deluxe pack version of the game includes guide book and a set of 12 postcards, but the plan was scrapped. The items became available through early orders of the game. In addition, pre-orders through Sofmap, Messe Sanoh and Gamers received a telephone card.

== Teams ==
=== Player team ===
- Holy Pegasus
- Lightning Knights
- Soul Sabers
- Crimson Phoenix

=== Rival team ===
- Mystic Mermaid
- Dual Valkyria
- Silent Vipers
- Fortune Angels
- Tall Crusader
- Wild Lynx
