= Super Dodge Ball =

Super Dodge Ball is a series of video games developed by Technōs Japan including:

- Super Dodge Ball (1987 video game), a video game for arcades
- Super Dodge Ball (1988 video game), a video game for the Nintendo Entertainment System
- Super Dodge Ball (1996 video game), a video game for the Neo Geo
