= Green Green =

Green Green may refer to:

- Green Green (video game), a 2001 Japanese H-game for computer
  - Green Green (anime), a 2003 Japanese 13-episode anime adaptation
- Green, Green, a 1963 hit single by The New Christy Minstrels
- GreenGreen, 2026 EP by Cortis
- Gringrin or Green Green, a character in the 1969 novel Isle of the Dead by Roger Zelazny
