= Super Dodgeball Brawlers =

2008 video game

- North American box art
- Developers: Arc System Works; Access Co.
- Publishers: JP: Arc System Works; NA: Aksys Games
- Platform: Nintendo DS
- Release: JP: March 19, 2008; NA: May 27, 2008
- Genre: Sports game
- Modes: Single-player, multiplayer

Super Dodgeball Brawlers, originally released in Japan as Chō Nekketsu Kōkō Kunio-kun Dodgeball Bu (超熱血高校 くにおくんドッジボール部, Chō Nekketsu Kōkō Kunio kun Dojjibōru Bu; "Super Nekketsu High School Kunio Dodgeball Club") is a dodgeball-based sports game released for the Nintendo DS.

This game marked the return of Kunio-kun characters in a dodge ball based on the characters owned by Million. It is also the first Kunio-kun game published in a mobile platform where the English-language version uses Japanese character and team names. Previously, only the Neo-Geo Super Dodge Ball game (developed and published by Technos) followed such naming rules. Aksys marketed Super Dodgeball Brawlers under the Kunio series, but the game does not use any previously available Super Dodge Ball music in all region releases.

== Gameplay ==
Ground supershots are performed by throwing ball when dashing at 5th step.

The tag combo ability from Super Dodge Ball Advance is lost.

In addition to the regular ball throws, player can also punch and kick opponents, as well as using other weapons, to deliver extra damages. Punching and kicking do not kill a player.

Random items appear when a player dies. Items can be thrown, or used such as the bottle.

Brawl mode (放課後クラブ活動モード), a feature introduced in the NES version of Super Dodge Ball under the name Bean Ball mode, is reintroduced to this game.

Also returning is the ability to equip players and building custom teams, features debuted in the SNES dodge ball game. Custom team can be built using stock team characters.

The English version of the game was reported to have faster game play.

=== Super Gauge System ===
For the first time in the series, a Nekketsu Burst Gauge is added, where player's can improve the teams attack and defence with a full gauge. The gauge is raised when hitting opponent or being hit, but loses when using a burst, or holding on the ball for an extended time period.

The team ability obtained depending on burst types, which can be chosen between matches:

- Ultimate: All shots becomes supershots.
- Hyper Armor: Player's team only receives 1 point of damage when hit, and penetration shot effect is cancelled.
- Hi-Dash Jump: Increases players' jumping and movement.
- Super Catch Dodge: Increases ball dodging and catching time.

=== Game modes ===
- Tournament: A game where player competes against 10 other teams, with America being the last team. A team gains experience and cash by attacking opponent, with the amount depending on number of hits landed. Item can be purchased between matches. Additional items are unlocked by defeating rival teams at different difficulty levels.
- VS: Team vs Team game. Multiplayer game can be played with only 1 cartridge.
- Brawl mode: 8 player fight against each other, without borders. Multiplayer game can be played with only 1 cartridge.
- Locker room: Creates custom team and the team members can be imported from built-in teams.

== Reception ==
Reception

Aggregate score
Aggregator	Score
Metacritic	65/100

Review scores
Publication	Score
1Up.com	C+
Famitsu	22/40
Hardcore Gamer	3.25/5
IGN	6.5/10
NGamer	61%
Nintendo Power	6.5/10
Nintendo World Report	7/10

The game received "mixed" reviews according to the review aggregation website Metacritic. In Japan, Famitsu gave it a score of 22 out of 40.

== Trivia ==
Some pictures of the game are shown in River City Super Sports Challenge.
