= List of Shimajirō films =

Japanese film franchise

Since 2013, ten Japanese animated feature films based on Benesse's Shimajirō franchise have been released.

== Feature films ==
=== Shimajirō to Fufu no Daibōken: Sukue! Nanairo no Hana (2013) ===
Shimajirō to Fufu no Daibōken: Sukue! Nanairo no Hana
- しまじろうと フフの だいぼうけん ～すくえ！七色の花～
- Directed by: Isamu Hirabayashi
- Written by: Yuka Osumi, Isamu Hirabayashi
- Story by: Hisayuki Toriumi, Shigeto Tsuji
- Based on: Shimajirō by Benesse
- Produced by: Tsutomu Chuji, Yutaka Sugiyama, Shin Furukawa, Kota Kimura, Hiroki Fujiwara, Madoka Katsumata, Yukari Kiso, Takashi Nakamura, Yoshimi Ishii
- Starring: Omi Minami; Miki Takahashi; Takumi Yamazaki; Saori Sugimoto; Mei Satô; Chafûrin
- Cinematography: Ken Murakami
- Music by: Daudi Joseph, Takashi Watanabe, Mamiko Katakura
- Production companies: The Answer Studio, DASH Co., Ltd., Demand, DENTSU INC., TV Setouchi Broadcasting(TSC), Benesse Corporation
- Distributed by: TOHO Visual Entertainment, Sony Music Direct, Megabox
- Release date: March 15, 2013
- Running time: 60 minutes
- Country: Japan
- Languages: Japanese, Korean, Chinese

Shimajirō to Fufu no Daibōken: Sukue! Nanairo no Hana (しまじろうと フフの だいぼうけん ～すくえ！七色の花～; Shimajirō and Fufu's Great Adventure: Save the Seven-Colored Flower!) is a 2013 Japanese children's live action/anime film. It's the first film to feature the character Shimajirō. The film is directed by Isamu Hirabayashi and was released on March 15, 2013.

Japanese Voice Cast

- Omi Minami- Shimajiro Shimano (voice)
- Miki Takahashi- Hana Shimano, Mimirin Midorihara (voice)
- Takumi Yamazaki- Torippii Sorano (voice)
- Saori Sugimoto- Nyakkii Momoyama (voice)
- Saki Fujita (voice)
- Aki Sasamori (voice)
- Kinryu Arimoto (voice)
- Chafûrin- Shimataro Shimano (voice)
- Kikuko Inoue- Sakura Shimano (voice)
- Bin Shimada (voice)
- Nobuo Tobita (voice)
- Shinobu Adachi (voice)
- Minoru Inaba (voice)
- Yuki Matsuoka (voice)
- Mitsuru Ogata (voice)
- Chinatsu Akasaki (voice)
- Marie Shiba (voice)
- Ai Fukada (voice)
- Kenji Nomura (voice)
- Mei Satô- Fufu the Fairy (voice)
- Yûichi Harada- Sawagani male
- Naoto Nojima- Sawagani male

Korean Voice Cast

- Oh Sang-so- Hobby
- Song Young-in- Benny
- Lee Woo Lee- Pero
- Shin Jung-hoon- Rynh
- Sang Woo Park- Dr. Leo

Chinese Voice Cast

- Xu Shuxuan- Qiao Hu
- Yang Kaikai- Chichi
- Liu Xihua
- Feng Jiade

=== Shimajirō to Kujira no Uta (2014) ===
Shimajiro to Kujira no Uta
- 劇場版しまじろうのわお！ しまじろうとくじらのうた
- Directed by: Isamu Hirabayashi, Hiroshi Kawamata
- Written by: Takashi Yamada, Isamu Hirabayashi
- Story by: Hisayuki Toriumi, Shigeto Tsuji
- Produced by: Tsutomu Chuji, Yutaka Sugiyama, Shuhei Ishibasi, Hiroki Fujiwara, Madoka Katsumata, Yukari Kiso
- Starring: Omi Minami; Miki Takahashi; Takumi Yamazaki; Saori Sugimoto
- Cinematography: Ken Murakami
- Music by: Daudi Joseph, Takashi Watanabe, Mamiko Katakura
- Production companies: The Answer Studio, DASH Co., Ltd., Demand, DENTSU INC., TV Setouchi Broadcasting(TSC), Benesse Corporation
- Distributed by: TOHO Visual Entertainment, Sony Music Direct, Megabox
- Release date: March 14, 2014
- Countries: Japan; South Korea; China; Indonesia
- Languages: Japanese; Korean; Chinese; Indonesian

Shimajirō to Kujira no Uta (しまじろうとくじらのうた; Shimajiro and the Whale's Song) is a 2014 Japanese film directed by Isamu Hirabayashi. The theme song of the film is "Kunshou" by Negoto and ending theme song is "Tomodachi no Wao!" by PUFFY.

Japanese Voice Cast

- Omi Minami- Shimajiro Shimano (voice)
- Miki Takahashi- Hannah, Mimirin (voice)
- Takumi Yamazaki- Torippii, Lion Police Officer (voice)
- Saori Sugimoto- Nyakkii Momoyama (voice)
- Kikuko Inoue- Shimajiro's Mother (voice)
- Nobuo Tobita- Kankachi (voice)
- Shinobu Adachi- Mimirin's Mother (voice)
- Minoru Inaba- Gaogao-San (voice)
- Akiko Toda- Buta (voice)
- Akemi Obata (voice)
- Yuko Kobayashi (voice)
- Shinpachi Tsuji (voice)
- Ai Fukada (voice)
- Kazumasa Katsura- Gigi (voice)
- Shiori Mastuda (voice)
- Makiko Yone (voice)
- Tatsuya Gashûin- Hermit Crab (voice)
- Sayu Kubota- Sea Fairy
- Naoto Nojima- Starfish Man
- Aki Sasamori- Zota (voice)

Indonesian Actors

- Lis Kurniasih- Shimajiro (voice)
- Leni M. Tarra- Hana, Mimi-Lynne (voice)
- Hardi- Flappie (voice)
- Jessy Millianty- Nikki (voice)

Korean Voice Cast

- Oh Sang-so- Hobi
- Song Young-in- Benny
- Lee Woo Lee- Pero
- Shin Jung-hoon- Rynh
- Sang Woo Park- Dr. Leo
- 배진홍 Bae Jinhong- Hobi
- 김두리 Kim Duri- Nanyi

Chinese Voice Cast

- Xu Shuxuan- Qiao Hu
- Yang Kaikai
- Liu Xihua
- Feng Jiade

=== Shimajirō to Ōkina Ki (2015) ===
Shimajirō to Ōkina Ki
- Poster
- しまじろうとおおきな木
- Directed by: Isamu Hirabayashi, Hiroshi Kawamata
- Written by: Takashi Yamada, Isamu Hirabayashi
- Story by: Hisayuki Toriumi, Shigeto Tsuji
- Produced by: Tsutomu Chuji, Yutaka Sugiyama, Koji Hosono, Azusa Shintaku, Hiroki Fujiwara, Madoka Katsumata, Yukari Kiso, Takashi Nakamura, Yoshimi Ishii
- Starring: Omi Minami; Miki Takahashi; Takumi Yamazaki; Saori Sugimoto
- Cinematography: Ken Murakami
- Music by: Daudi Joseph, Takashi Watanabe, Mamiko Katakura
- Production companies: The Answer Studio, DASH Co., Ltd., Demand, DENTSU INC., TV Setouchi Broadcasting(TSC), Benesse Corporation
- Distributed by: TOHO Visual Entertainment, Sony Music Direct, Megabox
- Release date: March 13, 2015
- Running time: 60 minutes
- Country: Japan
- Languages: Japanese; Korean; Chinese

Shimajirō to Ōkina Ki (しまじろうとおおきな木; Shimajirō and the Big Tree) is a 2015 Japanese children's live action/anime film. It's the third film to feature the character Shimajirō. The theme song of the film is "Hana no Nioi" by Chara. The first part of the film is in live action and the second is animated. The film was released on March 13, 2015.

Japanese Voice Cast

- Omi Minami- Shimajiro Shimano (voice)
- Miki Takahashi- Hannah, Mimirin (voice)
- Takumi Yamazaki- Torippii (voice)
- Saori Sugimoto- Nyakkii Momoyama (voice)
- Chafûrin- Shimajiro's Father (voice)
- Kikuko Inoue- Shimajiro's Mother (voice)
- Bin Shimada (voice)
- Nobuo Tobita (voice)
- Minoru Inaba- Gaogao-San (voice)
- Ayahi Takagaki (voice)
- Sayaka Nakaya (voice)
- Asami Imai (voice)
- Kenji Nomura (voice)
- Chika Makihara (voice)
- Kazushige Watanabe (voice)
- Katsumi Suzuki (voice)
- Ayumi Tsunematsu (voice)
- Satomi Otani (voice)
- Sakiko Uran (voice)
- Tsuyoshi Hirabayashi (voice)
- Tatsuya Gashûin- Froggie (voice)

Korean Voice Actors

- Oh Sang-so- Hobby
- Song Young-in- Benny
- Lee Woo Lee- Pero
- Shin Jung-hoon- Rynh
- Sang Woo Park- Dr. Leo

Chinese Voice Actors

- Xu Shuxuan- Qiao Hu
- Yang Kaikai
- Liu Xihua
- Feng Jiade

=== Shimajirō to Ehon no Kuni ni (2016) ===
Shimajirō to Ehon no Kuni ni
- しまじろうとえほんのくに
- Directed by: Isamu Hirabayashi, Hiroshi Kawamata, Yong Hirabayashi
- Written by: Takashi Yamada
- Story by: Hisayuki Toriumi, Shigeto Tsuji
- Produced by: Tsutomu Chuji, Shiho Kawahara, Yutaka Sugiyama, Masako Nagata, Koji Hosono, Hiromi Mitsuhasi, Hiroki Fujiwara, Madoka Katsumata, Yukari Kiso, Takashi Nakamura, Yoshimi Ishii
- Starring: Omi Minami; Miki Takahashi; Takumi Yamazaki; Saori Sugimoto
- Cinematography: Ken Murakami
- Music by: Daudi Joseph, Takashi Watanabe, Mamiko Katakura
- Production companies: The Answer Studio, DASH Co., Ltd., Demand, DENTSU INC., TV Setouchi Broadcasting(TSC), Benesse Corporation
- Distributed by: TOHO Visual Entertainment, Sony Music Direct, Megabox
- Release date: March 11, 2016 (in japan)
- Running time: 61 min
- Country: Japan
- Languages: Japanese, Korean, Chinese

Shimajirō to Ehon no Kuni ni (しまじろうとえほんのくに; To the Country of Picture Books with Shimajirō) is the fourth Shimajiro feature film. It was released on March 11, 2016.

Japanese Voice Cast

- Omi Minami- Shimajiro Shimano (voice)
- Miki Takahashi- Hana, Mimi-Lynne(voice)
- Takumi Yamazaki- Flappie (voice)
- Saori Sugimoto- Nikki Momoyama (voice)
- Kikuko Inoue- Shimajiro's Mother (voice)
- Minoru Inaba- Gaogao-san (voice)
- Uchida Maaya- Punitan (voice)
- Katsuhisa Houki (voice)
- Shizuka Itoh (voice)
- Kozo Shioya (voice)
- Ayumi Yoshida (voice)
- Megumi Toda (voice)
- Sawako Hata- Kurorin (voice)
- Yûka Nakanishi- Iwa (voice)
- Marika Minase (voice)
- Hitomi Suzuki (voice)
- Eri Inagawa (voice)
- Marie Shiba (voice)
- Honoka Inoue (voice)
- Tsuyoshi Hirabayashi (voice)
- Yuria Kizaki (AKB48)- Kicky (voice)
- Kanon Kimoto (AKB48)- Kicky (voice)

Korean Voice Actors

- Oh Sang-so- Hobby
- Song Young-in- Benny
- Lee Woo Lee- Pero
- Shin Jung-hoon- Rynh
- Sang Woo Park- Dr. Leo

Chinese Voice Actors

- Xu Shuxuan- Qiao Hu
- Yang Kaikai
- Liu Xihua
- Feng Jiade

=== Shimajirō to Niji no Oashisu (2017) ===
Shimajirō to Niji no Oashisu
- 劇場版しまじろうのわお！ しまじろうとにじのオアシス
- Directed by: Isamu Hirabayashi, Hiro Takashima
- Written by: Isamu Hirabayashi, 许英万 Yeong-man Heo
- Story by: Hisayuki Toriumi, Shigeto Tsuji
- Produced by: Tsutomu Chuji, Shiho Kawahara, Shinya Nakahara, Yukiko Nagaoka, Madoka Katsumata, Yukari Kiso, Takashi Nakamura, Yoshimi Ishii, 覃宏 Hong Qin, 郑泰成 Tae-sung Jeong
- Starring: Omi Minami; Miki Takahashi; Takumi Yamazaki; Saori Sugimoto; Mummy D. Cowcow; Hanako Yamada
- Cinematography: Ken Murakami
- Edited by: 황 종 환 Hwang Jong-hwan: Pipeline Technical Director
- Music by: Daudi Joseph, Takashi Watanabe, Tomonori Adachi, Miyu Nakahara, 金石源 Suk-won Kim Seongjang Lee Mamiko Katakura
- Production companies: The Answer Studio, DASH Co., Ltd., DENTSU INC., TV Setouchi Broadcasting(TSC), Benesse Corporation, Beaver House Studio
- Distributed by: TOHO Visual Entertainment, Sony Music Direct, Megabox
- Release date: March 10, 2017
- Running time: 54 Min.
- Country: Japan
- Languages: Japanese, Korean, Chinese, English

Shimajirō to Niji no Oashisu (しまじろうと にじのオアシス; Shimajirō and the Rainbow Oasis) is the fifth feature film in the Shimajirō franchise. It was released on March 10, 2017.

Japanese Voice Cast

- 南央美 Omi Minami- Shimajiro Shimano (voice)
- 高橋美紀 Miki Takahashi- Hannah, Mimirin, Coco (voice)
- 山崎たくみ Takumi Yamazaki- Torippii (voice)
- 杉本沙織 Saori Sugimoto- Nyakkii Momoyama (voice)
- Chafûrin- Shimajiro's Father (voice)
- Kikuko Inoue- Shimajiro's Mother, Coco's Mother (voice)
- 稲葉実 Minoru Inaba- Gaogao-San (voice)
- Ami Koshimizu (voice)
- Aya Hisakawa (voice)
- Akio Nojima (voice)
- Takayuki Miyamoto- Crocodiles (voice)
- Shinobu Adachi- Mimirin's Mother (voice)
- Mummy D- MC Spike (voice)
- 山田花子 Hanako Yamada- Rattlesnake (voice)
- COWCOW (多田健二 Kenji Tada & 善し Yoshi)- Turtles, Tsurukamezu, Uncle Fusokoro (voice)

English Voice Actors

- Diana Garnet- Coco (voice/English)
- Rumiko Varnes- Shimajiro (voice/English)
- Vinay Murthy- Flappie (voice/English)
- Mirei Yamagata- Nikki, Hana, Mimi-Lynne, Flappies Mother (voice/English)
- Yuki Toyoda (voice/English)
- Cyrus Nozomu Sethna (voice/English)
- Jack Merluzzi (voice/English)
- Sachiko Hara (voice/English)
- Rachel Walzer (voice/English)
- Kris Roche (voice/English)

Korean Voice Actors

- 오은수 Oh Sang-so- Hobby
- 송영인 Song Young-in- Benny
- 방지원 Lee Woo Lee- Pero
- 신정훈 Shin Jung-hoon- Rynh
- 박상우 Sang Woo Park- Dr. Leo
- 조연우 Yeon Woo Cho
- 방지원 Bang Ji-won- Pero

Chinese Voice Actors

- 許淑嬪 Xu Shuxuan- Qiao Hu
- 楊凱凱 Yang Kaikai
- 劉錫華 Liu Xihua
- 馮嘉德 Feng Jiade

=== Movie Shimajiro Mahō no Shima no Daibōken (2018) ===
Movie Shimajirō Mahō no Shima no Daibōken
- 映画しまじろうまほうのしまのだいぼうけん
- Directed by: Hiroshi Kawamata, Hiro Takashima
- Written by: Yuka Aoki
- Story by: Hisayuki Toriumi, Shigeto Tsuji
- Produced by: Shiho Kawahara, Yukinori Udagawa, Shinya Nakahara, Yukari Kiso
- Starring: Omi Minami; Miki Takahashi; Takumi Yamazaki; Saori Sugimoto
- Cinematography: Toshiharu Mizutani
- Music by: Tadao Harasaki, Shingo Nishimura
- Production companies: The Answer Studio, DENTSU INC., TV Setouchi Broadcasting(TSC), Benesse Corporation
- Distributed by: TOHO Visual Entertainment, BACKSTREETS INC., Sony Music Direct, Megabox
- Release date: 2018
- Running time: 52 min
- Country: Japan
- Languages: Japanese, English, Korean, Chinese

Movie Shimajiro Mahō no Shima no Daibōken (まほうのしまのだいぼうけん; Shimajiro: Big Adventure on Magic Island) is the sixth feature film in the Shimajirō franchise. It was released in 2018.

Japanese Voice Cast

- Omi Minami- Shimajiro (voice)
- Miki Takahashi- Hannah, Mimirin (voice)
- Takumi Yamazaki- Torippii (voice)
- Saori Sugimoto- Nyakkii Momoyama, Ramurin (voice)
- Chafurin (voice)
- Kikuko Inoue- Shimajiro's Mother (voice)
- Minoru Inaba- Gaogao-San (voice)
- Inori Minase (voice)
- Ako Mayama (voice)
- Bin Shimada- Drill (voice)
- Nobuo Tobita (SKE48)- Kanazuchi (voice)
- Shinobu Adachi- Pliers (voice)
- Nanami Yamashita (voice)
- Miki Tokoi (voice)
- Mie Nonagase (voice)
- Yui Hiwatashi (AKB48) (voice)
- Natsuki Kamata (SKE48)- Little Wizard (voice)
- Fuka Murakumo (NGT48) (voice)

English Voice Actors

- Diana Garnet- Aura (voice)
- Rumiko Varnes- Shimajiro (voice/English)
- Vinay Murthy- Flappie (voice/English)
- Mirei Yamagata- Nikki, Hana, Mimi-Lynne, Flappies Mother (voice/English)
- Yuki Toyoda (voice/English)
- Cyrus Nozomu Sethna (voice/English)
- Jack Merluzzi (voice/English)
- Sachiko Hara (voice/English)
- Rachel Walzer (voice/English)
- Kris Roche (voice/English)

Korean Voice Actors

- Oh Byon-so- Hobby
- Song Young-in- Benny
- Lee Woo Lee- Pero
- Shin Jung-hoon- Rynh
- Sang Woo Park- Dr. Leo
- Cho Yeon-woo- Hobby's Father

Chinese Voice Actors

- Xu Shuxuan- Qiao Hu
- Yang Kaikai
- Liu Xihua
- Feng Jiade

=== Shimajiro to Ururu no Heroland (2019) ===
Shimajiro to Ururu no Heroland
- 映画しまじろう しまじろうとうるるのヒーローランド
- Directed by: Takamitsu Kawamura, Ryoji Aoki
- Written by: Yumi Yamamoto
- Story by: Hisayuki Toriumi, Shigeto Tsuji
- Produced by: Shiho Kawahara, Yukinori Udagawa, Yukari Kiso, Nozomi Ogasawara
- Starring: Omi Minami; Miki Takahashi; Takumi Yamazaki; Saori Sugimoto
- Cinematography: Toshiharu Mizutani, Eri Yamanashi
- Music by: Tadao Harasaki, Shingo Nishimura
- Production companies: The Answer Studio, BACKSTREETS INC., TV Setouchi Broadcasting(TSC), Benesse Corporation
- Distributed by: TOHO Visual Entertainment, Megabox, Sony Music Direct
- Release date: 2019
- Running time: 58 min
- Country: Japan
- Languages: Japanese, Chinese, English

Shimajiro to Ururu no Heroland (しまじろうとうるるのヒーローランド; Shimajiro and Ululu's Heroland) is the seventh feature film in the Shimajirō franchise. It was released in 2019.

Japanese Voice Cast

- Omi Minami- Shimajiro Shimano (voice)
- Miki Takahashi- Hannah, Mimirin (voice)
- Takumi Yamazaki- Torippii (voice)
- Saori Sugimoto- Nyakkii Momoyama (voice)
- Chafûrin- Shimajiro's Father (voice)
- Kikuko Inoue- Shimajiro's Mother (voice)
- Minoru Inaba- Gaogao-San (voice)
- Katsumi Toriumi(voice)
- Nao Tôyama- Ururu (voice)
- Eiji Hanawa (voice)
- Youhei Tadano (voice)
- Taketora (voice)
- Ryoko Shiraishi (voice)
- Runa Goami (voice)
- Kazushige Watanabe (voice)
- Natsuko Momota (Momoiro Clover Z) (voice)
- Shiori Tamai (Momoiro Clover Z) (voice)
- Ayaka Sasaki (Momoiro Clover Z) (voice)
- Reni Takagi (Momoiro Clover Z) (voice)
- Kaori Asoh- Princess Strawberry (voice)
- Ryusei Nakao- Takoyaki Mask (voice)
- Mayumi Asano- Captain Mimi (voice)

English Voice Actors

- Diana Garnet- Ururu (voice)

=== Qiǎo hǔ dà fēichuán lìxiǎn jì (2019) ===
Qiǎo hǔ dà fēichuán lìxiǎn jì; (Eiga Shimajirō: Mahō no Shima no Daibōken)
- Chinese: 巧虎大飞船历险记; Japanese: しまじろうとそらとぶふね
- Directed by: Kawamura Tomohiro, He Cun, You Hong, Zhou Hong-Zhi, Po Jing-Zhen, Yoshio Maruyama
- Screenplay by: Sugiura Risa, Sugiura Masafumi, Wang Zhen
- Story by: Hisayuki Toriumi, Shigeto Tsuji
- Produced by: Wang Zhen, Karen Fu Ban-Sing, Xia Xi Jian Song, Du Jun, Chen Zhen-Yu
- Starring: Omi Minami; Miki Takahashi; Takumi Yamazaki; Saori Sugimoto
- Cinematography: Wang Xin
- Edited by: Lin Guo-Zhen
- Music by: Nonaka Yuichi, Okuda Ryo, Wang Zhen, Zhou Jian-Bo
- Production company: Benesse
- Release dates: June 1, 2019 (China); March 12, 2021 (Japan)
- Running time: 80 min (Chinese release); 59 min (Japanese release)
- Countries: China; Japan
- Languages: Chinese; Japanese

Qiǎo hǔ dà fēichuán lìxiǎn jì (巧虎大飞船历险记, Qiao Hu and the Fantastic Flying Ship) is the eighth feature film in the Shimajirō franchise, and the first Shimajiro film made in full CGI. The original 80-minute version was released in 2019 in Chinese/Hong Kong theaters. A 59-minute Japanese re-edit, Eiga Shimajirō: Mahō no Shima no Daibōken (しまじろうとそらとぶふね), was originally slated for a 2020 release delayed due to the COVID-19 pandemic; it was released in Japan on March 12, 2021.

Chinese Voice Cast

- Li Ye- Qiao Hu
- Chen Da-Wei- Tao Le-Bi
- Luo Yu-Ting- Qi Qi
- Wang Xiao-Tong- Miao Miao
- Sun Ye- Doctor Gao Gao
- Li Min-Yan- Li Li

Japanese Voice Cast

- Omi Minami- Shimajiro Shimano (voice)
- Miki Takahashi- Hannah, Mimirin (voice)
- Takumi Yamazaki- Torippii (voice)
- Saori Sugimoto- Nyakkii Momoyama (voice)
- Minoru Inaba- Gaogao-San (voice)
- Megumi Han- Lily (voice)
- Yūma Uchida- Jin (voice)
- Keiko Han- Lily's Mother (voice)
- Tomokazu Sugita- Garbiz boss (voice)

=== Qiǎo hǔ mófǎ dǎo lìxiǎn jì (2021) ===
Qiǎo hǔ mófǎ dǎo lìxiǎn jì; (Eiga Shimajirō: Miracle-jima no Nanairo Carnation)
- Chinese: 巧虎魔法岛历险记; Japanese: 映画しまじろう ミラクルじまのなないろカーネーション
- Directed by: Tomohiro Kawamura
- Story by: Hisayuki Toriumi; Shigeto Tsuji
- Starring: Ye Li
- Music by: Yuichi "masa" NONAKA
- Production companies: Benesse; Shanghai Heyuan Culture Media
- Release date: July 24, 2021 (China)
- Running time: 80 min
- Countries: China; Japan
- Language: Chinese

Qiǎo hǔ mófǎ dǎo lìxiǎn jì (巧虎魔法岛历险记, The Adventures of Qiao Hu on Magic Island) is the ninth feature film in the Shimajirō franchise and the second Shimajiro film to be in CGI animation. In October 2023, Benesse announced a 2024 Japanese version, Eiga Shimajirō: Miracle-jima no Nanairo Carnation (映画しまじろう ミラクルじまのなないろカーネーション), as the next installment in the series.

Chinese Voice Actors

- Li Ye- Qiao Hu (voice)
- Sun Ye- Doctor Gao Gao (voice)
- Wang Xiao-Tong- Miao Miao (voice)

Japanese Voice Actors

- Omi Minami- Shimajiro Shimano (voice)
- Miki Takahashi- Mimirin (voice)
- Takumi Yamazaki- Torippii (voice)
- Masami Suzuki- Nyakkii Momoyama (voice)
- Kikuko Inoue- Shimajiro's Mother (voice)
- Chafûrin- Shimajiro's Father (voice)
- Minoru Inaba- Gaogao-San (voice)

=== Shimajirō to Kirakira Ōkoku no Ōji-sama (2022) ===
Shimajirō to Kirakira Ōkoku no Ōji-sama
- しまじろうとキラキラおうこくの おうじさま
- Directed by: Takamitsu Kawamura
- Story by: Hisayuki Toriumi, Shigeto Tsuji
- Starring: Omi Minami; Miki Takahashi; Takumi Yamazaki; Sugimoto Saori (Posthumous release)
- Music by: Hyadain, Shoko Nakagawa
- Production companies: The Answer Studio Co., Ltd., Benesse Corporation, TV Setouchi
- Distributed by: TOHO Visual Entertainment
- Release date: March 22, 2022
- Country: Japan
- Languages: Japanese, Chinese

Shimajirō to Kirakira Ōkoku no Ōji-sama (しまじろうとキラキラおうこくの おうじさま; Shimajiro and the prince of Shining Kingdom) is the tenth feature film in the Shimajirō franchise. Released on March 22, 2022, it is the final film to feature Saori Sugimoto's voice before her death on October 21, 2021.

Japanese Voice Cast

- Omi Minami- Shimajiro Shimano (voice)
- Miki Takahashi- Hannah, Mimirin (voice)
- Takumi Yamazaki- Torippii (voice)
- Sugimoto Saori – Nyakkii Momoyama (voice)
- Minoru Inaba- Gaogao-San (voice)
- Chafurin as Shimatarō Shimano
- Kikuko Inoue as Sakura Shimano (voice)
- Shoko Nakagawa as Queen Emeralda
- Hiro Shimono as Maron
- Junichi Suwabe as Koron
- Yuuna Mimura as Prince Pearl

=== Qiaohu and the Fantasy Stage Adventure (2023) ===
Qiaohu and the Fantasy Stage Adventure
- 巧虎奇幻舞台历险记预告片-抖音
- Directed by: Tomohiro Kawamura
- Starring: Li Ye
- Production company: Benesse Corporation
- Release date: June 1, 2023
- Country: China
- Language: Chinese

巧虎奇幻舞台历险记预告片-抖音 (Qiaohu and the Fantasy Stage Adventure), is the eleventh feature film in the Shimajirō franchise. Released on June 1, 2023,

Chinese Voice Cast

- Li Ye- Qiao Hu
