= Green Green (video game) =

2001 Japanese video game

- Cover art to the DVD edition of the game.
- Developer: Groover
- Publishers: Groover (Windows); WellMADE (PS2)
- Series: Green Green
- Platforms: Windows, PlayStation 2
- Release: Windows: JP: October 5, 2001; PS2: JP: April 24, 2003
- Genres: Eroge, Visual novel
- Mode: Single player

Green Green (グリーングリーン, Gurīn Gurīn) is a Japanese H-game for Windows, developed and published by Groover. The game features a story that is centered on comedy and some suggestive situations. As such, the game falls under the Adventure Novel genre.

This game has been adapted into an anime television series and an original video animation. In addition, two sequels have followed it, along with two spin-off games released on PlayStation 2.

Green Green was originally released as two CD-ROMs on October 5, 2001 by Groover. Groover rereleased the game as a DVD with additional features on March 22, 2002.

The two PlayStation 2 spin-off games carried the subtitles of ~Kanenone Romantic~ and ~Kanenone Dynamic~. Both were released by WellMADE on April 24, 2003.

== Story ==
Green Green takes place in Japan's countryside, in a non-descript region with forests and an isolated boarding school known as Kanenone Gakuen (鐘ノ音学園, literally translated as Sound of Bell Academy) The academy boasts of an entirely male population, and prides itself of the tradition of men growing amongst other men without any external influences to disturb them.

The protagonist is named Yuusuke Takasaki, a second year student that is indifferent to the lonely, girl-deprived atmosphere that surrounds the school. His three friends, Tadatomo "Bacchiguu" Ijuuin, Hikaru Ichibanboshi and Taizou Tenjin, however, feel as if they are being denied their youth by having no females to interact with. As the summer session at Kanenone begins, Yuusuke and friends wonder what the change of season will bring to them, when Bacchiguu brings news that a bus full of girls has arrived on school grounds.

As luck would have it, Kanenone's current administration is considering making the academy co-ed, and in order to see how the change would affect the student body, first and second year girls have been brought to live on school grounds for one month. Though Yuusuke takes the change in stride, his three hormone-driven friends see this as the true beginning of their youth.

== Characters ==
Yuusuke Takasaki (高崎 祐介, Takasaki Yūsuke)
The main character. The player takes the role of Yuusuke, making choices for him throughout the course of the game. Despite being rather ordinary, Yuusuke seems to be the one who always takes the blame for the antics of his friends. In fact, at the beginning of the game, Yuusuke is writing an essay that was assigned to him as punishment for using fireworks on school grounds. The actual culprits were Bacchiguu, Tenjin and Ichibanboshi. He became the love interest of Futaba prior to the third game.

Midori Chitose (千歳 みどり, Chitose Midori)
Voiced by: Sara Nakayama
One of the many girls that arrive at Kanenone Gakuen. Though Yuusuke knows nothing about her, Midori hints throughout the game that she knows a lot about him. Unlike most of the other girls, Midori does her best to try to get boys and girls to get along, and finds the antics of Bacchiguu, Tenjin and Ichibanboshi to be amusing. Despite her simple personality and cheerful disposition, Midori is very intelligent and understands more than she lets on. Strangely enough, she encourages the young Ko-Midori to room with Yuusuke.

Futaba Kutsuki (朽木 双葉, Kutsuki Futaba)
Voiced by: Eriko Fujimaki
The tomboyish man-hater. Futaba is brought to Kanenone against her will, and does everything she can to cause trouble. This includes talking back to teachers and giving all males the cold shoulder. Because of her strong personality, other girls tend to see Futaba as their leader. She has no tolerance for perversion, which makes her the natural enemy of Bacchiguu, Tenjin and Ichibanboshi. Starts out as the love interest of Ichibanboshi, but later fell in love with Yuusuke in the third game.

Wakaba Kutsuki (朽木 若葉, Kutsuki Wakaba)
Voiced by: Yukiko Mannaka
Younger sister of Futaba. Unlike her older sister, Wakaba tries to make the best of her stay at Kanenone Gakuen. Some think of her as peculiar because of the cactus she always carries around but in reality Wakaba is very simple-minded, and can pass off as gullible at times. She does not have the modesty that is characteristic of girls in anime and games, and does as she is told without protest. She has a strong appreciation for plants that can bloom flowers.

Sanae Minami (美南 早苗, Minami Sanae)
Voiced by: Saori Sugimoto
A quiet, sick girl. Sanae keeps her distance from others, and does not make much of an effort to interact with her fellow students. She originally claims that her pill case carries only vitamins, but in reality it is medication for an illness she has. Physically, she is weak and looks younger than the other girls. This makes her the initial love interest of Tenjin, who has a younger sister complex.

Chigusa Iino (飯野 千種, Īno Chigusa)
Voiced by: Mariko Suzuki
The school nurse and science teacher. Chigusa arrives with the girls, and is solely responsible for keeping an eye on them during the one-month trial. Because she looks young, Yuusuke confuses her for a third year student and tries to nanpa her. From then on, she purposely calls Yuusuke "nanpa-kun" in public as a way of getting back at him. Despite being the adult, Chigusa is very easygoing, and takes on a rather active role in trying to get the boys and girls to get along. Her impressive proportions have earned her the admiration of several boys, most notably Bacchiguu.

Arisa Haruno (春乃 亜里紗, Haruno Arisa)
Voiced by: Noriko Yoshitake
The ugly girl. Initially dislikes the perverted ways of the boys, and does what she can to stay away from them. Arisa is one of the many girls that consider Futaba to be their leader, though ends up falling in love with Bacchiguu after he accidentally professes his feelings for her.

Tadatomo "Bacchiguu" Ijuuin (伊集院 "バッチグー" 忠知, Ijūin "Bacchigū" Tadatomo)
Voiced by: Kazunari Tanaka
Leader of the quartet that includes Ichibanboshi, Tenjin and Yuusuke. Though he is a pervert, his intentions are not bad, so long as sex is not involved. Tends to rush into things without thinking, and is quick to let Yuusuke take the blame for his antics. Originally infatuated with Chigusa, but later starts dating Arisa Haruno.

Hikaru Ichibanboshi (一番星 光, Ichibanboshi Hikaru)
Voiced by: Jin Domon
The yes man of the group. Ichibanboshi mostly follows whatever the group does, though has his own ideas on how to win the girls over. Is a bit more down to earth than Bacchiguu, but not by much. His weak character lures him to Futaba Kutsuki. On the side, he is a rock & roll guitarist with a band of his own.

Taizou Tenjin (天神 泰三, Tenjin Taizō)
Voiced by: Kenji Hamada
The big, dumb country boy. Despite his size, Tenjin is rather simple in his way of doing things. He is Yuusuke's roommate, and holds him in high regard. Tends to go along with whatever Bacchiguu plans, and is the muscle of the group. Has a fetish for really young girls (known as a younger sister complex), so he is naturally drawn to Sanae.

Ko-Midori (小みどり, Komidori)
Voiced by: Sara Nakayama
A little girl that mysteriously appears on school grounds, high atop the large tree that overlooks the school, which the students call Kanenone-sensei. She appears before Midori and Yuusuke, crying and confused about being away from home. Though Yuusuke is worried about finding the girl's parents, Midori pushes the option of letting her stay in his room until she can find a way home. Yuusuke in turn allows her to stay, and names her Ko-Midori because her favorite color is green. The "Ko-" in her name is Yuusuke's way of differentiating between her and Midori Chitose.

Kenichi Hotta (堀田 健一, Hotta Kenichi)
Voiced by: Hiroshi Kamiya

Kenta Koyasu (子安 ケンタ, Koyasu Kenta)
Voiced by: Akio Takahashi

Yasushi Todoroki (轟 やすし, Todoroki Yasushi)
Voiced by: Akio Takahashi

Kazuo Ogata (緒方 和夫, Ogata Kazuo)
Voiced by: Tetsu Inada

Katsuko Ono (小野 カツ子, Ono Katsuko)
Voiced by: Akemi Misaki

== Gameplay ==
=== General ===
The game takes place over the period of one month, from June 23 to the end of July (the exact date varies depending on which ending the player aims for). As such, game progression is daily, in which there are preset interactions in the early morning and late at night, with a block of time in the middle of the day that grants Yuusuke the opportunity to directly interact with one of the five lead heroines.

Some pre-set interactions are influenced by which girl Yuusuke last talked to and what choices the player made for him recently.

Should Yuusuke fail to win the heart of one of the five heroines by the end of July, the player is defaulted to a "common" ending.

Because Green Green falls into the novel genre of H-games, the player cannot change the protagonist's name, and instead assumes the role of Yuusuke.

=== Game engine ===
The game engine uses common elements found in dating simulation games, and as such is viewed in first person. Backgrounds are used to display the current location, with images of characters in Yuusuke's line of sight appearing on the screen. Characters that are not speaking will blink their eyes, and those that are speaking will move their lips accordingly. The current day is displayed on the upper left-hand corner of the screen.

A panel at the bottom of the screen is used to display text. At the sides of the panel are shortcut buttons to Load and Save games, toggle the current day display, access the game's Configuration menu, skip already-seen dialogue and have the game run on automatic.

Unlike most visual novel games, Green Green does not have a text log for dialogue.

=== Music ===
Green Green's music was composed by the two-man rock band known as Milktub, and falls under the instrumental rock and alternative rock genres.

Though the "common" ending uses the game's theme song, Green Green, each heroine has a song that is used during the closing credits:

- Midori Chitose: Monochrome (モノクローム, Monokurōmu)
- Futaba Kutsuki: Love Letter (ラブレター, Raburetā)
- Wakaba Kutsuki: Fleur (フルール, Furūru)
- Sanae Minami: Starry Sky (星空, Hoshizora)
- Chigusa Iino: Boy (男の子, Otoko no ko)

== Releases ==
=== CD-ROM ===
The original CD-ROM release of Green Green contained the game and few bonus features.

- Scene replay mode
- Music replay mode

=== DVD ===
The DVD rerelease of Green Green contained features not available in the original CD-ROM release. Most of these features are accessible by browsing the DVD. These included:

- Event Artwork Gallery
- Publicity Artwork Gallery
- Artwork Slideshows
- Trailers for Green Green

=== PlayStation 2 ===
The two PlayStation 2 releases of Green Green were direct ports from the original CD-ROM version of the game. However, both Kanenone Romantic and Kanenone Dynamic featured two new female characters each in addition to the original five. As such, there were a total of four new girls exclusive to the PlayStation 2, each with their own closing song and ending:

- Eri Yamazaki (山咲 枝理, Yamazaki Eri)
- Kozue Tsukimori (月森 こずえ, Tsukimori Kozue)
- Kaori Kusunoki (楠木 かおり, Kusunoki Kaori)
- Mina Ibuki (伊吹 美菜, Ibuki Mina)

In addition, new artwork, new closing songs for the original five girls and a built-in CG gallery were included. Because these were released on a video game console, all H-scenes were removed.

== Staff ==
- Character Designs - Shinji Katakura (片倉 真二, Katakura Shinji)
- Scenario - Noboru Yamaguchi (ヤマグチ ノボル, Yamaguchi Noboru), Yoshikazu Kuwashima (桑島 由一, Kuwashima Yoshikazu)
- Music - Milktub
- Character Voices:
  - Sara Nakayama (中山 さら, Nakayama Sara) (Midori Chitose, Ko-Midori)
  - Eriko Fujimaki (藤巻 恵理子, Fujimaki Eriko) (Futaba Kutsuki)
  - Yukiko Mannaka (満仲 由紀子, Mannaka Yukiko) (Wakaba Kutsuki)
  - Saori Sugimoto (杉本 沙織, Sugimoto Saori) (Sanae Minami)
  - Mariko Suzuki (鈴木 麻里子, Suzuki Mariko) (Chigusa Iino)
  - Noriko Yoshitake (吉竹 範子, Yoshitake Noriko) (Arisa Haruno)
  - Kazunari Tanaka (田中 一成, Tanaka Kazunari) (Bacchiguu)
  - Jin Domon (土門 仁, Domon Jin) (Ichibanboshi)
  - Kenji Hamada (浜田 賢二, Hamada Kenji) (Taizou Tenjin)

== Adaptations ==
=== Anime ===
Green Green was adapted into a 13-episode anime television series.

=== Light novels ===
The game was adapted into four light novels.

=== Connected games ===
- Green Green 2 ~Special Summer of Love~ (グリーングリーン２ ～恋のスペシャルサマー～, Gurīn Gurīn 2 ~Koi no supesharu samā~)
- Green Green 3 ~Hello, Goodbye~ (グリーングリーン３ ～ハローグッバイ～, Gurīn Gurīn 3 ~Harō gubbai~)
- Kanenone DYNATIC ~GuriGuri~ (鐘ノ音ダイナティック ～グリグリ～)

== Additional notes ==
Bacchiguu & Ichibanboshi: These names are derived from the names of the two members of Milktub (Japanese), who composed the music for Green Green. Bamboo became Bacchiguu, and Ichibanboshi Hikaru became a character name. Bamboo (real name: Hiroshi Takeuchi (竹内 博, Takeuchi Hiroshi)) is also listed as Green Green's producer.

Character Names: The five lead girls are named after plants or things connected to plants. Midori means "green", Kutsuki Futaba means "twin leaves on a decayed tree", Kutsuki Wakaba means "new leaves on a decayed tree", Minami Sanae means "southern rice seedlings" and Iino Chigusa means "field of a thousand seeds".

Kutsuki vs. Kuchiki: The pronunciation of Futaba and Wakaba's last name has been the subject of debate since the release of the game. The game itself seems to have trouble deciding how to pronounce 朽木, often shifting between Kutsuki (くつき) and Kuchiki (くちき). Most of the voice actors stick to Kutsuki when talking about Futaba, while they use Kuchiki when talking about Wakaba.

== Green Green high-cost, miscommunication and copyright dispute case ==
In 2000, the staff involved in the work of Green Green heavily engaged in Frontwing's first work, Canary ~Kono Omoi wo Uta ni Nosete~ finally releasing the project around August 2000, shortly after the release of Canary, half of the original staff including Bamboo decided to go on a trip to the countryside as vacation time to come up with their next project which was their next main focus for their game Green Green, a supposedly planned second work following before another game Hooligan which was scheduled to be released the summer of 2001, according to the Blue Canary fan disc released on Comiket 59. However, after Bamboo's involvement in working at a company named Gungho (which has no affiliation with the one that makes online games,) Bamboo decided to discuss the Green Green project with Gungho for help on production, which was an upcoming game title for the publisher FrontWing, who was appointed as the prominent director of the game. When he was appointed the director of this work, he promised fans of the Canary work that he would go above and beyond with his future projects, including Green Green, and planned to extend upon Canary's story while working on Green Green simultaneously.

After some discussions, Gungho and Frontwing signed a verbal agreement to communicate effectively on issues regarding the game. After the scenario, CG and other game features were polished and ready for advertising. Sakamoto stepped in to produce the Canary Visual Guide Book, which revealed four pages with details of the upcoming title and character CG of the characters of Green Green. Shortly after the release of this book and a release date for summer was on the horizon, Gungho attempted to sign a payment contract with FrontWing so that they could transfer Green Green's assets for publishing under the Frontwing name. However, because of the high costs that Gungho had demanded from Frontwing for the work, FrontWing decided against the high production costs and pulled themselves out of the agreement. Bamboo had expressed disappointment that nothing was gained from the work he put so much hard work into making. Whether Bamboo was fired or left on his own accord is unknown. Still, it was confirmed after May that his credit as a director of Canary had been removed from the Canary Normal Edition Plus Re-Release and the official page for the game until the console version of the game, where his credit was exclusively reinstated.

Soon after, the official site for Green Green was finally revealed around late May, claiming that the site was a runaway site. The site unveiled Starlink as the publisher and GROOVER as the official new brand for this product. This confused fans and publishers, which caused controversy within the visual novel community in Japan. With all of the rumors, FrontWing, oblivious to what was happening in the background, posted a message on their site in June 2001 stating that there was a misunderstanding about the handling of their staff at FrontWing, claiming that Katakura Shinji, the illustrator responsible for creating illustrations was not a staff of FrontWing, but is the team responsible for the Green Green project. FrontWing also noted that half of the staff responsible for Canary were freelance writers who took their time to create stories for said companies and weren't considered official Frontwing employees.

In November 2001, Frontwing, which still believed they still held the copyright of Green Green, noticed the release of Green Green under said publisher shortly after it released their second work, Hooligan, and decided to postpone their "supposedly confidential" asset, Green Green, until further notice. With this notice, they filed a lawsuit against Sakamoto, Bamboo, and Gungho for copyright infringement. Ryuichiro Yamakawa (Representative of FrontWing) claimed that the creation was an idea jointly created with Bamboo and claimed that the product was advertised before its release, making it a work of their company. He also claimed that Bamboo needed to work more with Frontwing, as he spent most of his time working with Gungho. However, as stated before, Gungho had yet to reach a formal contract agreement on the game's sales, so Gungho asked Sakamoto Co. Ltd for assistance in advertising the product in advance. Based on the information given, it was evident that Gungho and Bamboo were working on the game. Still, because the work had little affiliation with Front Wing, as admitted by Front Wing in a short post on their site dating back to June of that year, the law sided with Gungho and Bamboo as it was already too late to decide as the release was already released, finished and published by a different entity. Bamboo broke Article 3 of Japanese law, concealing information that he was working for another company and revealing confidential assets like Green Green to Gungho without FrontWing's permission, which are hostile entities by competitive nature.
