= Yumeria =

Japanese manga series & video game

- Artwork for the front cover of the North American release by ADV Films of DVD volume 1.

ゆめりあ
- Genre: Harem; Magical girl; Romantic comedy
- Video game
- Developer: Namco
- Publisher: Namco
- Music by: Satoru Kōsaki
- Genre: Visual novel
- Platform: PlayStation 2
- Released: April 24, 2003
- Anime television series
- Directed by: Keitaro Motonaga
- Written by: Yōsuke Kuroda; Makoto Uezu
- Music by: Sonic Dove
- Studio: Studio Deen
- Licensed by: NA: Sentai Filmworks
- Original network: TBS, BS-i
- English network: NA: Anime Network
- Original run: January 8, 2004 – March 25, 2004
- Episodes: 12

Yumeria (ゆめりあ) is a Japanese anime series and a PlayStation 2 video game created by Namco. The video game and anime were both initially released in Japan in 2003. Studio Deen produced a 12-episode anime television series broadcast on TBS in Japan in 2004. The series was originally licensed in North America by ADV Films who initially released the series in three English language DVD volumes in 2005 and 2006.

== Plot summary ==
Tomokazu Mikuri, the main character in the game and anime, turns 16 years old and has led a dull life without girls. On the night of his birthday, he dreams of a strange world in which he sees a young girl in a blue outfit fighting against an unknown enemy. Tomokazu has a strange, unknown power which seems to "power up" this girl, who has fallen into his arms. She uses this "power" to repel enemies, the alien race known as the Feydooms, who are attempting to break through the dream world and take over the real world.

Waking up, Tomokazu is amazed at his dream's realism, thinking of his strange power and the mysterious girl who fought off her enemies. Rolling over, he is shocked to see the girl from his dream, Mone, in bed next to him. Soon Tomokazu, his classmate Mizuki Agatsuma, Mone, Neneko, Nanase, and her sister Kuyou enter the dream world Moera to destroy the Feydooms and save the world.

=== Characters ===
Tomokazu Mikuri (三栗 智和, Mikuri Tomokazu)
A helpless 16-year-old high school student with many friends, he is unknowingly the Destiny Transformer who is meant to change the world. He enjoys taking care of kids like Neneko and Mone. He is a pervert and unknowingly shows it very much. Though he is kind, he is lazy and does not enjoy studying. His parents died at a young age, he lives with his guardian and cousin, Nanase. His fighting suit is black and dark red with a red gem embedded in the chest. He has a crush on Mizuki in the anime and does not like when Ishikari acts perverted toward her and Mone. His special attack is "Tomokazu Kick". Voiced by: Wataru Hatano (Japanese); Chris Patton (English)

Mone (モネ)
A small 10-year-old girl who Tomokazu first finds in Moera. Her speech is limited to saying her name, or mixed-up parts of it. She seems to be attached to Tomokazu. Her hair has a purplish tint, and her fighting suit is blue and white with an orange gem in the breast. In truth, she is the Priestess of Sleep, who has no real body. This means she is incredibly powerful in Moera. Her special attack is "Monemonemone". Voiced by: Moyu Arishima (Japanese); Brittney Karbowski (English)

Mizuki Agatsuma (吾妻 みづき, Agatsuma Mizuki)
Tomokazu's childhood friend. She is also 16, kind and thoughtful, and is always there for her friends. She secretly loves Tomakazu. She is also very conservative about her body. She has long red hair, and her fighting suit is pink with a pink gem in the breast. Her special attack is "Spiral Power Flare" and "Flare Explosion." Voiced by: Masumi Asano (Japanese); Monica Rial (English)

Nanase "Silk" Senjou (千条 七瀬, Senjō Nanase)
Tomokazu's cousin and legal guardian. Ever since Tomokazu's parents died, they have been together as a family. She works for the Head Family and has been watching Tomokazu ever since he was little. She is a well-endowed twenty-something graduate student, and despite their relationship, she enjoys putting Tomokazu's face in her expansive bust. She appears to have feelings for Tomokazu; she once asked him if she had a chance for his love. She has long brown hair, and her fighting suit is green and black with a dark red gem in the breast. In Moera, she takes on the form of "Silk", a powerful warrior with extensive knowledge of Moera. Her special attack is "Hydro Punisher". Voiced by: Kikuko Inoue (Japanese); Nancy Novotny (English)

Kuyou Senjou (千条 九葉, Senjō Kuyō)
Nanase's younger sister. She is 14 and has known Tomokazu since she was little, but she emigrated to America. She calls Tomokazu "Tomo", and frequently calls him a pervert. She also starts many of her sentences with "Frankly". She has sea green hair pulled into pigtails, and her fighting suit is yellow with a green gem in the breast. She holds the Arrow of Destiny, a powerful technique made to destroy the Feydooms. Her special attack is "Collider Bit". Voiced by: Sara Nakayama (Japanese); Jessica Boone (English)

Neneko (ねねこ)
A cat-loving 9-year-old junior detective, who considers everything a mystery. She calls Tomokazu "Darling", and herself, "Darling's wife". Like Mone, she often displays her behind to him. She owns a large mallet marked 765 kilograms (1,687 lb). She has a unique manner of speech, constantly using phrase such as "Really, it is!" and "Y'know!" She houses the spirit Neito inside her body. She wears a yellow cap that appears to conceal real cat ears, and her fighting suit is orange with a green gem in the breast. Whether or not she has real cat ears has yet to be confirmed, but they twitch when she is excited. Her special attack is "Super Extreme Tornado Attack" and "Calamity Ripper". Voiced by: Tamaki Nakanishi (Japanese); Luci Christian (English)

Neito (ネイト)
The spirit of a reverse re-incarnating woman from the future. She lives in Neneko's body and takes over when Neneko sleeps. In her future, the world has been destroyed by the Feydooms, so she goes back in time to help Tomokazu. In the end, she appears to be Neneko's twin sister. She also has a little grey cat named "Keito". Voiced by: Mariko Suzuki (Japanese); Tiffany Salinas (English)

Koneko (コネコ)
Neneko's cat, who only appears in the anime. She seems to understand humans. She originally did not trust Neito. She eventually is able to go to Moera. Voiced by: Misato Fukuen (Japanese); Jessica Boone (English)

Megumi Saitou (斎藤 メグミ, Saitō Megumi)
A friend of Tomokazu and Mizuki. She is one of Tomokazu's childhood friends. She is a teen idol, who dresses up in a bunny costume to the delight of her fans. Voiced by: Kaori Tanaka (Japanese); Tiffany Salinas (English)

Mr. Ishikari (石狩先生, Ishikari-sensei)
Teacher of Tomokazu's class. He is kind to all his students, except Tomokazu, against whom he holds a grudge, though Tomokazu said he used to be kind. He has a heavy lolita fetish, which he openly admits to. As a result, he appears even more perverted than Tomokazu. Voiced by: Tetsu Inada (Japanese); John Gremillion (English)

Tomoko Mikuri
Tomokazu's mother. She was the Destiny Transformer sixteen years ago, but was unable to destroy the Feydooms. She sacrificed her life to slow down the Feydooms, and passed on her power to Tomokazu at birth. Voiced by: Yuko Shioyama (Japanese); Luci Christian (English)

Tomokazu's Father
He brings Tomokazu to the Head of the Family, whom he works for in a position of middling authority. He is just as lazy as Tomokazu and makes bad katsudon.

Head of the Family
As his name states, he runs operations in the family, and expects Tomokazu to listen to him, which he doesn't. Voiced by: Masashi Hirose (Japanese); Chris Ayres (English)

== Media ==
=== Game ===
Yumeria (ゆめりあ) is a Namco video game released by Namco in Japan for the PlayStation 2 on April 24, 2003. The game was never released in an English version or licensed for distribution outside Japan. However, Neneko and Neito do appear in Project X Zone, which released in regions outside of Japan in 2013, as a singular assist character.

=== Manga ===
Yumeria (ゆめりあ) was also adapted into manga series illustrated by Katsura Yukimaru and published by Media Works. The series was published in the manga Dengeki Daioh in 2003. A related manga series, Yumeria 1/2 (ゆめりあ 1/2), was published by Media Works in the manga Dengeki Daioh in 2004. Neither manga series was ever released in English nor licensed for distribution outside Japan.

=== Anime ===
==== North American release ====
The series was originally licensed and released in North America by ADV Films. ADV Films also produced the English language version initially released in three DVD volumes beginning in 2005 and in two complete DVD collections in 2007 and 2009. In 2013 Sentai Filmworks licensed the series for North America, released a complete DVD collection of all twelve episodes of the ADV Films English version and posted the series (English only) on the Anime Network online streaming site.

- Yumeria - Into the Dreamscape (DVD 1), episodes 1–4, release date: 2005-10-11
- Yumeria - Tossing and Turning (DVD 2), episodes 5–8, release date: 2005-11-22
- Yumeria - The End of a Dream (DVD 3), episodes 9-12, release date: 2006-01-03
- Yumeria - DVD Complete Collection (Thinpak) (DVD 1-3), episodes 1-12, release date: 2007-01-09
- Yumeria - Complete Collection (DVD), episodes 1-12, release date: 2009-03-17
- Yumeria - Complete Collection (DVD), episodes 1-12, release date: 2013-11-12

==== Reception ====
Yumeria - Into the Dreamscape (DVD 1) (2005) was reviewed by Theron Martin of Anime News Network and assigned grades from "D+" (story) to "B+" (art) Chris Beveridge of Mania.com assigns a grade of "C+" overall and Tim Henderson of animefringe gives it a "3" out of "5".

Yumeria - DVD Complete Collection (Thinpak) (DVD 1-3) (2007) was reviewed by Bryan Morton of Mania.com and assigned an overall grade of "B−".

Yumeria - Complete Collection (DVD) (2009) was reviewed by Chris Beveridge and assigned an overall grade of "B−".
