= Mariko Suzuki =

Japanese voice actress

- 鈴木 麻里子
- Born: January 30, 1970 (age 56); Minato-ku, Tokyo, Japan
- Occupation: Voice actress
- Years active: 1994–present
- Agent: Aoni Production

Mariko Suzuki (鈴木 麻里子, Suzuki Mariko; born January 30, 1970) is a Japanese voice actress who works for Aoni Production.

== Notable voice roles ==
=== Anime ===
- Air Master (Yu Takigawa)
- DearS (Harumi Ikuhara)
- Detective Conan (Tenko Himemiya)
- Green Green (Chigusa Iino)
- Gunparade March (Sarasa Wichita)
- Mythical Detective Loki Ragnarok (Urd)
- Ragnarok The Animation (Zealotus)
- Sentimental Journey (Honoka Sawatari)
- Tenchi Muyo! GXP (Amane Kaunaq)
- Xenosaga: The Animation (KOS-MOS)
- Yumeria (Neito)

=== Games ===
- Atelier Iris: Eternal Mana (Zeldalia)
- BS Tantei Club: Yuki ni Kieta Kako (Reiko Nomura)
- Castlevania: Portrait of Ruin (Stella, Loretta)
- Dead or Alive: Dimensions (Irene Lew)
- Edelweiss (Mei Ibuki)
- Green Green (Chigusa Iino)
- Lifeline (Rio Hohenheim)
- Meltylancer (Felnates Felie)
- Mugen no Frontier: Super Robot Wars OG Saga (KOS-MOS, Cardia Basirissa, T-elos)
- Mugen no Frontier EXCEED: Super Robot Wars OG Saga (KOS-MOS, Cardia Basirissa, T-elos)
- Namco × Capcom (KOS-MOS, Waya-Hime)
- Naval Ops: Warship Gunner (Professor Braun)
- Ninja Gaiden II (Irene Lew)
- Ninja Gaiden 3 (Irene Lew)
- Project X Zone (KOS-MOS, T-elos, Neito)
- Project X Zone 2 (KOS-MOS, T-elos)
- Riviera: The Promised Land (Malice) (PSP version)
- Rockman X: Command Mission (Marino)
- Samurai Warriors (Nōhime)
- Samurai Warriors 2 (Nōhime)
- Samurai Warriors 3 (Nōhime)
- Samurai Warriors 4 (Nōhime)
- Sentimental Journey (Honoka Sawatari)
- Super Robot Wars Original Generations (Echidna Iisaki)
- Tales of the Abyss (Nephry Osborne, Gelda Nebilim)
- Time Crisis 4 (Elizabeth Conway)
- The King of Fighters EX2: Howling Blood (Jun Kagami)
- Xenoblade Chronicles 2 (KOS-MOS Re:)
- Xenosaga Episode I: Der Wille zur Macht (KOS-MOS)
- Xenosaga Episode II: Jenseits von Gut und Böse (KOS-MOS)
- Xenosaga Episode III: Also sprach Zarathustra (KOS-MOS, T-elos)
- Yggdra Union: We'll Never Fight Alone (Zilva, Marietta, #367) (PSP version)
- Yumeria (Neito)

== Dubbing ==
- Rugrats (Dil Pickles)
- Peanuts (Lucy Van Pelt)
- The Rugrats Movie (Dil Pickles)
- Rugrats in Paris: The Movie (Dil Pickles)
- Rugrats Go Wild (Dil Pickles)
- Over the Hedge (Gladys Sharp)
