= Lifeline (video game) =

2003 video game

- Developer: Sony Computer Entertainment Japan
- Publisher: Sony Computer Entertainment: NA: Konami
- Director: Manabu Nishizawa
- Producers: Yasuhide Kobayashi; Takafumi Fujisawa
- Designer: Manabu Nishizawa
- Programmer: Takayuki Wakimura
- Artists: Taku Nakamura; Benimaru Watari
- Composer: Shingo Okumura
- Platform: PlayStation 2
- Release: JP: January 30, 2003; NA: March 2, 2004
- Genre: Survival horror
- Mode: Single player

Lifeline, released in Japan as Operator's Side, (Note: Japanese: オペレーターズサイド, Hepburn: Operētāzu Saido) is a 2003 survival horror adventure video game developed and published by Sony Computer Entertainment for the PlayStation 2. Set in the near future aboard a space hotel attacked by unidentified monsters, the game follows the player as they direct cocktail waitress Rio Hohenheim to safety while searching for the player's girlfriend Naomi as well as the source of the monster infestation.

Lifeline's defining aspect is its voice user interface: the vast majority of gameplay is conducted by using the PlayStation 2's microphone to issue commands, which are interpreted by the game via speech recognition to control Rio and dictate her movements and actions.

Lifeline was released on January 30, 2003, in Japan and March 2, 2004, in North America by Konami; in Japan, it was optionally sold alongside the PlayStation 2 headset. It received generally mixed reviews, with praise for its innovation and potential but criticism for the low reliability of its speech recognition. However, Lifeline still sold well enough to be rereleased in Japan on September 25, 2003, under Sony's The Best budget range, and the game has maintained somewhat of a cult following over the years since its release for its innovative gameplay and the depth of its voice mechanics.

== Gameplay ==
Lifeline is a survival horror adventure game where the player issues orders to Rio Hohenheim as she attempts to escape a monster-infested space station. The standout feature of Lifeline is its voice user interface, in which the player speaks into their microphone to command Rio. The player never directly controls Rio, nor any other character, at any point in the game; rather, they are required to tell her what to do at any given time, such as directing her where to go, advising her to examine or use objects, or ordering her what to aim for during a battle with a monster. Such spoken commands include "run", "stop", "dodge", and "turn left", among many others (approximately 500 commands exist), which prompt Rio to perform specific actions and progress throughout the game. To issue commands, the player must hold the input mic button (the O button on the DualShock controller) before speaking.

The player can access various menus which provide inventory insertions, detailed maps, and commands to unlock multiple parts of the station. By using the menus available, the player directs Rio in combat, solves puzzles, examines and interacts with objects of note, and interacts with NPCs. During a battle, the player can order Rio to manoeuvre within the battle space, shift focus to certain enemies, or target specific body parts. Combat perspectives switch between first-person and that of nearby cameras, with the latter more suitable for encounters with numerous foes. Plot interactions are followed through at the player's general discretion, with Rio inquiring about which path of action to take.

In regular situations, the player can converse with Rio, with the latter sometimes inquiring about it. The player can play games with her (e.g. challenge each other to tongue twisters, with Rio receiving health if completed), ask her to do sexual things (e.g. to "do a sexy pose", which she may or may not follow through with), or simply engage in small talk with her (e.g. suggest she eat food or shoot at a static object; she may do so, or more commonly explain her rationale for not doing so). There are also a few Easter egg conversations; for instance, Rio can ask about the player's girlfriend's name, and react with surprise if the player gives her name or the name of Rio's voice actor.

== Plot ==
In 2029, the player character, an unnamed young man only referred to as the "Operator", and his girlfriend Naomi (Sayaka in the Japanese version) attend a Christmas party aboard the Japan Space Line's Space Station Hotel, a large space station orbiting Earth serving as a premium hotel for the ultra-rich. Suddenly, unidentified alien-like monsters attack the festivities, killing most of the guests and staff and separating Naomi and the Operator, who is trapped in the Space Station Hotel's main control room. From the control room, the Operator, having full access to the Space Station Hotel's mechanisms and cameras, comes into contact with Rio Hohenheim (voiced by Mariko Suzuki in the Japanese version and Kristen Miller in the English version), a cocktail waitress who survived the initial attack after being locked in a holding cell for her safety and is attempting to contact the control room. Communicating with Rio through her headset, the Operator agrees to help her and assists her through the perils of the station, while also attempting to find Naomi and investigate the source of the monsters.

After fighting their way through monsters, clearing difficult puzzles, and coming across both fellow survivors and a paramilitary rescue force, Rio and the Operator learn that the monsters are not extraterrestrials, but rather horribly-mutated humans resulting from an attempt to recreate the philosopher's stone that, instead of healing someone, cursed them to remain alive and drastically mutated them beyond recognition. They also learn that the stone needed to be created in a zero-gravity environment and that the station is now on a collision course with Earth to return the stone for use as a weapon. Along the way, Rio meets with her father, now a disillusioned, disembodied brain in a jar incapable of recognizing her, while the Operator reunites with Naomi, who has since been mutated but is still holding on to her humanity; both die after meeting the pair.

In the end, Rio and the Operator destroy the lead monster, and they meet in person for the first time. Now adamant to destroy the stone, Rio and the Operator set the Space Station Hotel to self-destruct and manage to reach an escape pod in time. Rio thanks the Operator as the escape pod starts a descent towards Earth.

== Development ==
Lifeline had two major early prototypes, according to Director of Game Design Nishizawa Manabu, the first of which was made to run on PC. Three months into the initial prototyping stage, they were able to issue basic commands like "stop", "walk", etc., to the character that would eventually become Rio. Initially, Rio was designed as "a brown-haired girl in a black sleeveless outfit, culottes, boots, and a gun". Nishizawa shares his excitement about the early version of the game: "I fearfully pressed the space key on the keyboard and said walk into the microphone. The next moment I let go of the keys, I got goosebumps all over my body [...] I felt a little futuristic. Looking back, I think that if it wasn't for the excitement I felt then, Operator's Side would not have been completed."

== Reception ==
Reception

Aggregate score
Aggregator	Score
Metacritic	61/100

Review scores
Publication	Score
Edge	4/10
Electronic Gaming Monthly	4.33/10
Game Informer	8.75/10
GamePro	3/5
GameSpot	6.5/10
GameSpy	1/5
GameZone	6/10
IGN	6.8/10
Official U.S. PlayStation Magazine	2.5/5
X-Play	2/5
The Cincinnati Enquirer	3.5/5

Lifeline received "mixed or average" reviews, according to video game review aggregator Metacritic. The voice command system, though the game's primary feature, has often been noted to be its weak point, due to inaccurate actions taken when commands are given, and the basic sense of conversation and directions reduced to simple verbs and nouns, particularly when in the course of solving many of the game's puzzles.

IGN noted that while the voice recognition system is "quite deep", the player "will need to practice enunciating regular words and learning the speed at which the game best responds", and "might spend five minutes trying to get the right word to simply inspect a worthless book."

In 2008, Game Informer listed Lifeline among the worst horror games of all time. In 2009, GamesRadar included it among the games "with untapped franchise potential", commenting: "While this frustrated many PS2 owners, it made others feel more attached to the characters. Improvements in headset and voice-recognition technology make a franchise more viable on today’s systems."
