= Sentimental Graffiti =

Video game

センチメンタルグラフティ (Senchimentaru Gurafuti)
- Genre: Romance, Drama
- Video game
- Developer: NEC Interchannel
- Publisher: NEC Interchannel
- Genre: Dating simulation
- Platform: SG1: Sega Saturn (SS); PlayStation (PS); Windows (Win); PlayStation Network (PSN); SG2: Dreamcast (DC); Windows (Win)
- Released: SG1: 22 January 1998 (SS); 30 October 1998 (PC); 29 March 2001 (PS); 10 February 2010 (PSN); SG2: 27 July 2000 (DC); 23 March 2001 (Win)
- Anime television series

Sentimental Journey
- Directed by: Kazuyoshi Katayama
- Written by: Naruhisa Arakawa
- Studio: Sunrise
- Original network: TV Tokyo
- Original run: April 8, 1998 – July 1, 1998
- Episodes: 12

Sentimental Graffiti (センチメンタルグラフティ, Senchimentaru Gurafuti) is the name of a dating simulation series by NEC Interchannel. An anime television series based on the series was later produced, titled Sentimental Journey. Three Japanese radio dramas based on the series, titled Sentimental Night, Kaettekita Sentimental Night, and Only Sentimental Night 2 were produced. A number of non-broadcast Japanese audio dramas have also been produced. Several dojin games have been made based on the characters, including the infamous Sentimental Shooting scrolling shooter, which combines a very engaging (and difficult) shoot 'em up with provocative imagery. Its nicknames amongst fans are typically Senchi or the contraction SenchiGura.

Following the 1994 hit success of Tokimeki Memorial, NEC Interchannel initiated a cooperation between Tabeta Toshio and the main staff of the Graduation series with game production house Marcus in an attempt to produce a "Tokimeki-like" game. While the six central characters were cast by Seiji Productions, the remaining six were considered unconventional for the time in that they were selected for public appeal. At the time, many of the staff and cast were unknown by the general public, which spurred a large media sales campaign designed to widen the game's exposure and establish it as a new brand. Advertisements and articles were placed in many magazines such as Dengeki G's Magazine as well as the TBS radio show Sentimental Night which aired in 1997. A unit entitled "SG girls" was formed and numerous events and concert were held. The promotion paid off, as sales of various related goods took off, the game received a positive reaction from fans, and copies became scarce.

In the Sentimental Journey anime, each episode is presented like an epilogue to the game scenario, focusing on one of the girls and telling a short romantic story. The common thread among the stories is the presence of a nondescript boy (possibly not even the same boy) who used to be a childhood crush or best friend, or just a short acquaintance, before moving away. This boy would have an influence over the girl's present life. The stories range widely from straightforward girl-gets-boy romance to friendships of various sorts and sometimes supernatural events.

North American Sentimental Journey DVD was released by Media Blasters officially on September 14, 2004. The copy contains all 12 episodes on 2 discs.

Sentimental Graffiti Re, a remake of the first game, was announced in June 2026. The game is being developed by Entergram and GungHo Online Entertainment.

== Heroines ==
Akira Endou (遠藤 晶, Endō Akira)
Voice actress: Urarako Suzuki
Akira met the protagonist when he walked in on her practicing the violin and encouraged her to put true feeling to her music. In the anime, she quits violin after placing second in a competition, but her piano accompanist pursues her and tries to win her back.
Asuka Hoshino (星野 明日香, Hoshino Asuka)
Voice actress: Asami Okamoto
Asuka wanted to date the protagonist, imagining herself to be the heroine of a popular romantic comedy film, but she fell ill on the day that they were supposed to go out and he moved away soon after. In the anime story, Asuka is a typical clumsy, underachieving high school girl who works part-time at a diner, until a talent scout named Tazaki, who is hoping to win a Koimari plate on a wager, chooses Asuka and trains her for a My Fair Lady beauty contest, working on her speech and mannerisms, including getting her to walk on a balance beam bridge over water. Asuka begins to show signs of maturity until the day of the contest where she doesn't show up. Tazaki's producer colleague says that Asuka heard on the radio that the protagonist might be in town so she waits in the theater for him all day. They conclude she made the right ladylike decision.
Chie Matsuoka (松岡 千恵, Matsuoka Chie)
Voice actress: Chizu Yonemoto
The protagonist and Chie were charged with arranging the school festival, and together they managed to make the event one of the biggest in school history, but the protagonist moved away before Chie could sing the song she had composed for him. In the anime story, she is the lead singer in a local band where one of the guys she likes starts to distance himself from her and hangs out more and more with another woman. It turns out he wants to write love songs (something Chie has shielded herself from doing) and the woman is an agent for a record company.
Emiru Nagakura (永倉 えみる, Nagakura Emiru)
Voice actress: Ai Maeda
Emiru was ostracized by her peers for her strange mannerisms, but the protagonist didn't mind and became friends with her. When he had to move, they made a time capsule promising each other that they would continue to be friends after they grew up. In the anime, she visits her old school which is in the process of being demolished but is soon haunted by the spirit attached to the school. She looks for the time capsule which is an old soda bottle with a letter she wrote with her love interest about meeting each other again. Meanwhile, the spirit of the school wants to possess her to keep its memory alive.
Honoka Sawatari (沢渡 ほのか, Sawatari Honoka)
Voice actress: Mariko Suzuki
The protagonist was one of Honoka's few male friends, having won her trust in a riding accident when she fell off her horse and the protagonist let her fall on him. They kept an exchange diary until the protagonist had to move away. In the anime, Honoka is in high school, and continues to write letters to the protagonist. Meanwhile, a postman regularly appears and watches over her. Honoka is afraid of getting into any relationships with guys, thinking they are all dirty, and she would rather hang out with her father. She gets concerned that her father is having an affair with his assistant as they were rumored to be going out one night. It turns out her father went out to seek advice on how to interact better with Honoka, and that the assistant was also asking help on better relationships. This leads Honoka to continue writing. She turns down the postman, who after sensing she doesn't need him anymore, disappears.
Kaho Morii (森井 夏穂, Morii Kaho)
Voice actress: Yukiko Mannaka
Kaho is one of the best runners in her school, and had claimed crowns in every event except for the relay race. The protagonist is roped into joining the team and practices with Kaho every day, but he had to move away on the day of the race. In the anime story, Kaho continues to remember the protagonist, even putting the practice baton in a shrine, when Kyoko, her best friend and running mate on the track team, reveals that she is moving away. Kaho gets her grandmother to make a special Tsūtenkaku okonomiyaki. Kyoko coaches Kaho for a little bit until she confronts Kaho that she needs to forget about the guy and think of her teammates. This upsets Kaho so much that she does not want to be friends with her. The day of Kyoko's departure, Kaho has second thoughts and tries to catch up to her to apologize and to send her off.
Manami Sugihara (杉原 真奈美, Sugihara Manami)
Voice actress: Machiko Toyoshima
Manami was often ill and therefore absent from school, but after meeting the protagonist and taking care of an injured bird with him, she gained the courage to be stronger. In the anime story, Manami is in the hospital with a febricula illness, and learns that her illness might be terminal. She gets worried about what she can leave for others in the future.
Miyuki Hosaka (保坂 美由紀, Hosaka Miyuki)
Voice actress: Yuki Makishima
Miyuki worked in her parents' kimono store and felt tremendous pressure to inherit the family business because her siblings had run away from home. An offhand remark by the protagonist suggesting that the kimonos her parents sold were as beautiful as the paintings she made caused her to change her mind. In the anime story, she is pressured by her parents to meet a guy for a future arranged marriage. At first she refuses but is tricked by her parents to entertain a visiting relative, who turns out to be the same guy. After he bumbles about, she agrees to help him visit a garden where she learns she still loves the art of kimono. The guy calls off the arranged marriage, and they both agree they aren't ready for such a relationship.
Rurika Yamamoto (山本 るりか, Yamamoto Rurika)
Voice actress: Hiromi Konno
Rurika accidentally broke a fossil when cleaning up after class, but the protagonist (who also had cleaning duties that day) took responsibility for the act. In the anime story, Rurika vows never to tell lies because of the incident. Six years later, Rurika is in high school and meets a girl Kazumi at the convenience store she works at. Kazumi hands her a confession letter intended for Rurika's brother. Rurika calls her up and learns Kazumi wants to go on a date with him before she goes to America for surgery. Rurika tries to accommodate her wishes by dressing up and pretending to be her twin brother, taking her on the date. She keeps the act going for most of the day until they visit an exhibit where she sees a large sculpture of the same fossil on the wall and it spooks her into dropping her wallet. Kazumi tells Rurika she had a good time even after she found out she is a girl, and that she is heading to America not because she was sick but that she wants to be a nurse.
Taeko Adachi (安達 妙子, Adachi Taeko)
Voice actress: Junko Okada
Taeko was the protagonist's neighbor when they were children (making her chronologically the first girl he met) and the two often teased by the other kids as the "Adachi couple". In the anime, Taeko notices her shy friend Chigusa has an interest in Tetsuro, whom she has known since childhood and they work together as class representatives for the school festival. Taeko invites Chigusa and Tetsuro over and tries to set up some private time, just like in typical shōjo manga, but it doesn't seem to go well. Taeko encourages Chigusa to knit a sweater for Tetsuro, but Chigusa runs into some situations where Tetsuro seems to be more friendly with Taeko than her, such as catching her when she trips for a hug, and calling her by her first name. Tetsuro mentions he also has someone he's interested in and that he is also moving. Taeko assumes Tetsuro is interested in her, so she tries to resolve things only to learn that Tetsuro and Chigusa do like each other after all, and that Tetsuro is only moving neighborhoods and not leaving school.
Wakana Ayasaki (綾崎 若菜, Ayasaki Wakana)
Voice actress: Michiko Oda
Wakana was locked in the family warehouse as punishment for trespassing; the Protagonist, though he was chased out for this infraction as well, sneaked back in at night to be with her so she wouldn't be afraid. The two then found an old music box that played a lovely melody. In the anime story, Wakana is feeling rather glum; she has a philosophical discussion with her grandparents' friend Gengaku, a Zen Buddhist monk at Tenryu temple, on her earthly desires of falling in love, dealing with a friend's family divorce, and whether feelings of love are a good or bad thing. After Gengaku and Wakana walk around and visit the city for some snacks, Gengaku tells her a story where a guy is in love with a girl and makes promises for her but lets his best friend who simply loves her to have her. Wakana thinks that the best friend did a horrible thing but Gengaku changes her perspective, asking if that's really the case or whether the guy was selfish with his promises. The friend and the girl are happily married for 52 years. At the end of the episode, Gengaku reveals that the guy became a Buddhist monk and is enjoying a snack with his best friend's granddaughter.
Yuu Nanase (七瀬 優, Nanase Yū)
Voice actress: Yuka Nishiguchi
Yuu met the protagonist by chance one evening during summer vacation and watched a Perseid meteor shower with him, but he transferred away before the school year began. In the anime story, she is befriended on a train by a young woman, Kotone Serizawa, who rescues her from a harassing guy. Kotone has a cynical view of love, having recently broken up with her boyfriend. Yuu starts to change Kotone's perspective by stating she believes in true love. Later on, Kotone catches Yuu, who is heading to Miyajima to see the annual meteor shower, hoping to reunite with the guy. A typhoon reaches the area that night, but they stay until the eye of the storm and see meteors in that moment of time.

== Sentimental Graffiti 1 ==
The first game focused on the relationship between a boy and the various girls he met throughout his life. The protagonist, Tanaka Ichirou, is a high school student who, prior to the spring vacation of his third year, receives a letter simply stating "I want to meet you". During middle school, his frequent transferring of schools allowed him to form unique relationships with various girls. In order to search for the sender of the letter, he travels nationwide to various places, and meets the 12 girls of his memories once again.

The Saturn version of Sentimental Graffiti was the top-selling game in Japan the week of its release.

== Sentimental Graffiti 2 ==
The second game takes place in a world in which the first protagonist died in a traffic accident during his journey. The game takes place in a college town in which the original 12 girls have gathered to attend. The protagonist, Shiina Kouhei, is a second-year college student and a member of the Photography Club. He has been tasked with the job of finding his own model for the photo exhibition at the upcoming school festival, and thus turns to one of the now emotionally scarred girls in hopes of convincing them to become his model.

Sentimental Graffiti 2 was received on a much smaller scale than the first one. By this time, the momentum of the series had already been lost since three years had passed since the release of the original and by this time the genre was flooded with similar games. In addition, the original scenario writer was not in charge of the second game, stating that even if he did wanted to, it was impossible for him to write such a continuation as to have the original protagonist die in such a way. Moreover, fans of the series were upset by the change in Taeko Adachi's voice actress, who was played by Arishima Moyu for the sequel.
