= Eriko Fujimaki =

Japanese voice actress

Eriko Fujimaki (藤巻 恵理子, Fujimaki Eriko; born October 18, 1974) is a Japanese voice actress from Tokyo, Japan and is employed by Aoni Production.

== Filmography ==
=== Television animation ===
- Bomberman B-Daman Bakugaiden (1998) – Caster
- Guruguru Town Hanamaru-kun (1999–2001) – Hanamaru
- Hikaru no Go (2001) – Zhao Chi
- Green Green (2003) – Futaba Kutsuki

=== Original video animation ===
- Green Green (2002) – Futaba Kutsuki

=== Video games ===
- Bloody Roar 3 (2000) – Uranus
- Green Green (2001) – Futaba Kutsuki
- Tekken 4 (2001) – Miharu Hirano
- Xenosaga Episode I: Der Wille zur Macht (2002) – Lapis Roman
- Bloody Roar 4 (2004) – Uranus
- Tales of Destiny (2006) – Marian Fustel

=== CDs ===
- One: Kagayaku Kisetsu e

=== Dubbing ===
==== Animation ====
- Madeline – Chloe

==== Live-action ====
- Freaks and Geeks – Amy
- The Players Club – Ebony Armstrong (Monica Calhoun)
- The Wednesday Woman – Mimi Davidson (Britt Irvin)
