= Saori Sugimoto =

Japanese voice actress (1964–2021)

- 杉本 沙織
- Born: 17 November 1964
- Died: 21 October 2021 (aged 56)
- Occupation: Voice actress
- Years active: 1987–2021
- Employer: Aoni Production
- Notable work: Shima Shima Tora no Shimajirō as Ramurin Makiba; Trapp Family Story as Martina von Trapp; Nintama Rantarō as Kisanta Yamamura; Green Green as Sanae Minami

Saori Sugimoto (杉本 沙織, Sugimoto Saori; 17 November 1964 – 21 October 2021) was a Japanese voice actress known for voicing Ramurin Makiba in Shima Shima Tora no Shimajirō, Martina von Trapp in Trapp Family Story, Kisanta Yamamura in Nintama Rantarō, and Sanae Minami in Green Green.

== Biography ==
Saori Sugimoto, a native of Fujisawa, Kanagawa, was born on 17 November 1964. She was educated at Aonijuku's Tokyo campus, where she was part of the sixth graduating class. She voiced Asuka in Fist of the North Star 2, which she later said was her debut role.

She was nationally-known as a voice actress in children's programming. In 1993, she began voicing Ramurin Makiba in Shima Shima Tora no Shimajirō and continued doing so afterwards; she also voiced Nyakkii Momoyama. She also voiced Kisanta Yamamura in Nintama Rantarō, succeeding Tomiko Suzuki. She also starred as Martina von Trapp in Trapp Family Story, Catherine Bloom in Mobile Suit Gundam Wing, and Sanae Minami in Green Green. On 1 January 2003, she changed her stage name from Saori Suzuki (鈴木 砂織, Suzuki Saori) to Saori Sugimoto.

Sugimoto was a licensed chef and nutritionist. She collected spoons as a hobby and her special skill was flower therapy.

Sugimoto took a career hiatus from May 2017 until April 2018 due to health issues. Sugimoto died on 21 October 2021, aged 56, due to congestive heart failure associated with anorexia. Her family held a private funeral on 28 October. An in memoriam caption was added to the end of the 30 October 2021 broadcast of Shimajirō no Wow!.

== Filmography ==
=== Animated television ===
Year	Title	Role(s)	Ref
1987	Fist of the North Star 2	Asuka	
1988	Bikkuriman	Chakkun Cutter, Joshi Suisai	
1988	Sakigake!! Otokojuku	Child	
1988	Hello! Lady Lynn	Nancy	
1989	Kariage-kun	Takashi Kimura	
1989	Shin Bikkuriman	Besutaniya	
1991	Chibi Maruko-chan	Natsumi Murata	
1991	Matchless Raijin-Oh	Reiko Ikeda, Miki Mano	
1991	The Brave of Sun Fighbird	Takashi	
1991	Trapp Family Story	Martina von Trapp	
1993	Shima Shima Tora no Shimajirō	Ramurin Makiba	
1995	Mobile Suit Gundam Wing	Catherine Bloom	
1995	Romeo and the Black Brothers	Nana	
1998	Sorcerous Stabber Orphen	Ruru	
1998	Takoyaki Mantoman	Princess	
1998	Fortune Quest L	Cathy	
2001	Crayon Shin-chan	Kutsuzoko Atsumi	
2003	Green Green	Sanae Minami	
2003	Sonic X	Boom 1	
2004	Nintama Rantarō	Kisanta Yamamura	
2008	Hakken Taiken Daisuki! Shimajirō	Ramurin Makiba	
2010	Shimajirō Hesoka	Ramurin Makiba	
2012	Shimajirō no Wow!	Nyakkii Momoyama	

=== Original video animation ===
Year	Title	Role(s)	Ref
1991	Midori no Mamorigami	Weather girl	
1996	Galaxy Fraulein Yuna Returns	Malina	
1997	Gundam Wing: Endless Waltz	Catherine Bloom	

=== Animated film ===
Year	Title	Role(s)	Ref
1993	Sangokushi: Chōkō Moyu!	Singing children	
2011	Nintama Rantarō: Ninjutsu Gakuen Zen'in Shutsudō! no Dan	Kisanta Yamamura	
2013	Shimajiro to Fufu no Daiboken: Sukue! Nanairo no Hana	Nyakkii Momoyama	
2014	Shimajirō to Kujira no Uta	Nyakkii Momoyama	
2015	Gekijoban Shimajiro no Wao! Shimajiro to Okinaki	Nyakkii Momoyama	
2016	Gekijoban Shimajiro no Wao! Shimajiro to Ehon no Kun	Nyakkii Momoyama	
2017	Gekijoban Shimajiro no Wao! Shimajiro to Niji no Oashisu	Nyakkii Momoyama	
2018	Eiga Shimajiro: Mahou no Shima no Daiboken	Nyakkii Momoyama, Ramurin Makiba	
2019	Eiga Shimajiro: Shimajiro to Ururu no Hirorando	Nyakkii Momoyama	
2022	Eiga Shimajiro: Shimajiro to Ururu no Hirorando	Nyakkii Momoyama	

=== Video games ===
Year	Title	Role(s)	Ref
1992	Galaxy Fräulein Yuna	Marina	
1994	Kunio's Oden	Kazumi Hasebe and Satomi Momozono	
1994	Sotsugyō II: Neo Generation	Yurika Tani	
1995	Galaxy Fräulein Yuna II: Eternal Princess	Marina	
1996	Sotsugyō: Crossworld	Yurika Tani	
1997	Dragon Master Silk	Lardy, Princess Sheila	
1997	Sotsugyō: Vacation	Yurika Tani	
1997	Galaxy Fräulein Yuna 3: Lightning Edition	Emelina Fairchild, Marina, Kaede Yumioka	
1998	First Kiss Story	Miho Kasugano	
1998	Galaxy Fräulein Yuna: Final Edition	Marina, Emilia Fairchild, Kaede Yumioka	
1999	Pokekano: Hōjōin Shizuka	Shizuka Hōjōin	
2001	Jade Cocoon 2	Vanilla	
2001	Green Green	Sanae Minami	
2003	Green Green: Kanenone Dynamic	Sanae Minami	
2003	Green Green: Kanenone Romantic	Sanae Minami	
