= Sara Nakayama =

Japanese voice actress (born 1974)

- 中山 さら
- Born: Manami Nakayama; January 29, 1974 (age 52); Saitama Prefecture, Japan
- Occupation: Voice actress
- Years active: 1993–present
- Agent: Aoni Production
- Height: 162 cm (5 ft 4 in)

Sara Nakayama (中山 さら, Nakayama Sara; born January 29, 1974) is a Japanese voice actress who is affiliated with Aoni Production. Her birth name, as well as her former stage name, is Manami Nakayama (中山 真奈美, Nakayama Manami).

== Biography ==
She is from Saitama prefecture.

== Filmography ==
=== Television animation ===
- .hack//Legend of the Twilight – Female Heavy Blade
- .hack//SIGN – Kao-chin
- D.N.Angel – Riku Harada
- Gegege no Kitaro (1996) – Megumi
- Gegege no Kitaro (2007) – Yobuko
- Great Teacher Onizuka – Kumiko Fukada
- Green Green – Midori Chitose
- The Melancholy of Haruhi Suzumiya – Mai Zaizen
- Sailor Moon Supers – Kyokumadanko (129), Ayatoriko (139), Autobiko (142), Elephanko (146), GaraGara-musume (150)
- Spice and Wolf – Helena
- One Piece – Porche
- Yumeria – Kuyou Senjyou

=== Original video animation (OVA) ===
- Alien Nine – Miyu Tamaki

=== Films ===
- Futari wa Pretty Cure Max Heart – Pear
- Gegege no Kitaro: Daikaijuu – Megumi

=== Video games ===
- Other Life: Azure Dreams – Vivian Merca
- Room with Lina – Lina Kanzaki
- Shadow Hearts – Yoshiko Kawashima
- Super Dodge Ball – Angela
- Tales of Legendia – Pippo
- Yumeria - Kuyou Senjou
- Rakugaki Showtime – Ex Calibur
- Pac-Man World 2 – Pinky

=== Tokusatsu ===
- Tokusou Sentai Dekaranger – Ocarnaian Amy (12)

=== Dubbing ===
- Speed 2: Cruise Control – Drew (Christine Firkins)
