= Miki Takahashi =

Japanese voice actress and singer

- 高橋 美紀
- Born: September 19, 1961 (age 64); Bunkyo, Tokyo, Japan
- Occupations: Voice actress Singer
- Years active: 1983-1987; 1993-present
- Agent: SplashDream
- Website: takahashi-miki.com

Miki Takahashi (高橋 美紀, Takahashi Miki; born September 19, 1961) is a Japanese voice actress and singer from Bunkyo, Tokyo. Together with her friend Chika Sakamoto, she participated in the third incarnation of the radio show Animetopia. She is a member of SplashDream.

== Anime ==
=== TV ===
- Around the World in Eighty Days (Princess Romy)
- Aura Battler Dunbine (Ceila Lapana)
- Battle Athletes Victory (Tomoe Midō)
- Flame of Recca (Mifuyu Mikagami)
- Fruits Basket (Mine Kuramae)
- Genesis Climber Mospeada (Aisha, Marlene Rush)
- Gu-Gu Ganmo (Ayumi Ichigaya)
- Highschool! Kimengumi (Yui Kawa)
- Meimon! Dai San Yakyūbu (Sayuri Kidō)
- Shima Shima Tora no Shimajirō (Mimirin Midorihara and Hana Shimano (Hana-chan)
- Touch (Tomoko Terashima)

=== OVAs ===
- Battle Athletes Victory (Tomoe Midō)
- Dōkyūsei: End of Summer (Mai Sakuragi)
- Dream Hunter Rem II: Seimi Shingakuen no Yōmu (Meimi Katsuragi)
- Elf Princess Reine (Reine)
- Galaxy Fraulein Yuna (Yuri Cube)
- Majo demo Steady (Mami)
- Tenmonya Voyagers (Ayako Hanabishi)
- Wanna-Be's (Eri Kazama)

=== Movies ===
- Arion (Resufīna)
- Highschool! Kimen-gumi (Yui Kawa)
- Toire no Hanako-chan (Yoshiki Ishikawa)
- Shimajirō to Fufu no Daibōken: Sukue! Nanairo no Hana (2013) (Mimirin Midorihara and Hana Shimano (Hana-chan)
- Shimajirō to Kujira no Uta (2014) (Mimirin Midorihara and Hana Shimano (Hana-chan)
- Shimajirō to Ōkina Ki (2015) (Mimirin Midorihara and Hana Shimano (Hana-chan)
- Shimajirō to Ehon no Kuni ni (2016) (Mimirin Midorihara and Hana Shimano (Hana-chan)
- Shimajirō to Niji no Oashisu (2017) (Mimirin Midorihara and Hana Shimano (Hana-chan)
- Shimajiro Mahō no Shima no Daibōken (2018) (Mimirin Midorihara and Hana Shimano (Hana-chan)
- Shimajiro to Ururu no Heroland (2019) (Mimirin Midorihara and Hana Shimano (Hana-chan)
- Shimajiro to Sora Tobufune (2021) (Mimirin Midorihara and Hana Shimano (Hana-chan)
- Shimajirō to Kirakira Ōkoku no Ōji-sama (2022) (Mimirin Midorihara and Hana Shimano (Hana-chan)

== Games ==
- Asuka 120% (Nana Owada)
- Atelier Iris: Eternal Mana (Iris)
- Atelier Iris 2: The Azoth of Destiny (Iris)
- Dragon Force (Teiris)
- Doki Doki Poyacchio (Pia)
- Chūka na Janshi Tenhō Paiko (Yayoi)
- First Kiss Story (Hiyori Sōgetsu)
- Game Tengoku series (Miki)
- Growlanser III: The Dual Darkness (Yayoi Tachibana)
- Xenoblade Chronicles 2 (Vess)
- Idol Janshi Suchie Pai series (Yūki Mizuno)
- Only You: Reberukurusu (Momoki Kagami)
- Simple Character 2000 Series Vol.5: Highschool! Kimen-gumi: The Table Hockey (Yui Kawa)
- Super Robot Wars series (Shīra Rabāna)

== CDs ==
- Volkslied (Atelier series)
