= Green Green (TV series) =

Japanese anime television series

- Key visual of the series

グリーングリーン (Gurīn Gurīn)
- Genre: Romantic comedy
- Light novel
- Written by: Noboru Yamaguchi
- Illustrated by: Shinji Katakura
- Published by: Media Factory
- Imprint: MF Bunko J
- Original run: November 2002 – January 2004
- Volumes: 5
- Original video animation
- Produced by: Takayuki Imayama
- Written by: Kazuhisa Sakaguchi; Yoshikazu Kuwashima
- Music by: milktub
- Released: December 20, 2002
- Anime television series
- Directed by: Yuji Muto
- Produced by: Tatsuya Ishihguro
- Written by: Atsuhiro Tomioka
- Music by: Shinkichi Mitsumune
- Studio: Studio Matrix
- Licensed by: US: Media Blasters
- Original network: TV Kanagawa, TV Saitama
- English network: US: Toku
- Original run: July 12, 2003 – September 27, 2003
- Episodes: 12
- Original video animation

Green Green: Erolutions
- Directed by: Yuji Muto
- Produced by: Hisatoshi Yoshikawa
- Written by: Atsuhiro Tomioka
- Music by: Shinkichi Mitsumune
- Studio: Studio Matrix
- Released: May 28, 2004
- icon

Green Green (グリーングリーン, Gurīn Gurīn) is a Japanese, 12-episode anime adaptation of the H-game of the same name. A non-canon sequel exists to the story as a thirteenth episode, which was released at a later date. This 'Episode 13' is unlicensed and not included in the US release.

Media Blasters licensed Green Green for distribution in North America, and the first volume was released on May 16, 2006. They have since released the 12 TV episodes on three DVDs, first separately throughout 2006, and then in two different budget collections in 2007 (the original single volumes in a box) and 2009 (the three discs in one "Litebox" case). The series premiered in the U.S. television in January 2016 on the channel Toku.

== Story ==
Green Green takes place in the countryside of Japan, at the isolated all-boys boarding school of Kanenone Gakuen (translated literally in English as "Sound of the Bell Academy"). Since there are no females for miles, the school is advertised as the "last remaining paradise for men on Earth". The Kanenone school board has begun talks to merge with an all-girls boarding school, in hopes of becoming a co-ed boarding school. This has the hormone-driven, girl-deprived male body of Kanenone thrilled.

Both schools decide to have a test run of sorts, having the girls from the all-girls school stay at Kanenone for a month, in order to see how the boys and girls can get along with one another. Yuusuke Takazaki, the main character, has his hands full with his "perverted" roommates, nicknamed the Baka ("Idiot") Trio. The Baka Trio - which consists of Bacchi-Gū, an overweight shameless pervert, Ichiban-Boshi, a self-proclaimed ladies man, and Tenjin, a gentle giant who has a "little sister" fetish - are incredibly excited that there will be girls around at their school.

When the buses containing the girls arrive, one girl named Midori Chitose excitedly disembarks first, leaping at and happily hugging a confused Yuusuke. Who is Midori and how does she know Yuusuke? The series focuses on answering this question and the antics of the Baka Trio.

== Characters ==
Yuusuke Takasaki (高崎 祐介, Takasaki Yuusuke)
Voiced by: Atsushi Kisaichi (2002 OVA), Ken Takeuchi (TV series, Erolutions) (Japanese); Bryce Papenbrook (English)
The main male lead, Yuusuke is perhaps the most "normal" of the boys at Kanenone. He is friends with the Baka Trio, but does not share their more perverted interests. Despite this, the Baka Trio consider Yuusuke to be a member of their group, and he usually finds himself forced or dragged along into involvement with their less-than-wholesome activities.
Yuusuke is implied to be the reincarnation of the boy from the tale of ill-fated lovers mentioned at the start of every episode, with Midori as his partner. However, Yuusuke appears to have no recollection of his past, and initially responds to Midori's affectionate advances by either pushing her away or treating her harshly. Only after recovering his past memories does he fall in love with her. Yuusuke also finds himself liking the tomboyish Futaba Kutsuki, creating a love triangle between the three main characters.
Tadatomo Ijuuin (伊集院 忠知, Ijuuin Tadatomo) aka Bacchi-Gū (バッチグー)
Voiced by: Kazunari Tanaka (Japanese); Peter Doyle (English)
Tadatomo is the overweight, long haired, leader and most perverted member of the Baka Trio who has no shame. The arrival of beautiful girls to Kanenone seems to send him out of control. He does things such as drinking the bath water the girls recently bathed in, to making a nipple print of his own nipples so he can imagine they belong to a girl. Bacchi-Gū is considered to be the lead comic relief of the series and is the male mascot of Green Green.
Hikaru Ichiban-Boshi (一番星光, Ichibanboshi Hikaru)
Voiced by: Jin Domon (Japanese); Ezra Weisz (English)
Literally translated in English as "number one shining star," Ichiban-Boshi believes himself to be a suave ladies man. He has a book of pick-up lines to use on his new female classmates, but he always fails and makes a fool of himself. He is the least perverted member of the Baka Trio.
Taizo Tenjin (天神 泰三, Tenjin Taizō)
Voiced by: Kenji Hamada (Japanese); Neil Kaplan (English)
Tenjin is the gentle giant of the Baka Trio. He has an odd fetish. He dreams of having Sanae consider him a big brother, and then she will sleep next to him... while he smells her and eats rice at the same time (a joke referring to the word okazu, which means both "meal" and "porn"). Sanae's young appearance makes him instantly attracted to her, but Sanae wants nothing to do with Tenjin.
Midori Chitose (千歳 みどり, Chitose Midori)
Voiced by: Sara Nakayama (Japanese); Cindy Robinson (English)
The main female lead, Midori is an outgoing and cheerful girl who seems to know Yuusuke and is in love with him. She seems willing to do anything for him, even filling out a form of perverted questions the Baka Trio gave her, hoping it will please Yuusuke. In the opening scene of the series, Midori narrates a tale about two people who were in love, but their love was forbidden at the time and they could not stay together. They promised each other to meet again in another life, hinting that Midori is the girl from the tale and somehow retained her memories, while Yuusuke is the boy from the tale, but he has not retained the memories of his past life. She is also noted to have D-cup breasts. She seemingly has no grasp at the effects some of her antics have wrought, such as climbing on top of a bedridden Yuusuke in the nurses' office while in lingerie, and hanging on to his arm after class ended. Her given name means "green" in Japanese, probably in reference to the name "Green Green".
Futaba Kutsuki (朽木 双葉, Kutsuki Futaba)
Voiced by: Eriko Fujimaki (Japanese); Kristen Rutherford (English)
Futaba plays the role of the tough, boy-hating tsundere. She is less than enthusiastic about the co-ed trial run of the schools, and acts as the self-appointed protector of the girls against the boys of Kanenone. She is particularly disgusted by the antics of the Baka Trio, and does not hesitate to resort to physical violence against them as punishment for their indiscretions. After the Baka Trio pulls a humiliating prank on her, she decides to leave Kanenone immediately on her own. She gets lost and injured in the surrounding woods but is rescued by Yuusuke, who carries her back to Kanenone. This act of kindness, along with an earlier display of chivalry by Yuusuke to protect her modesty, sparks feelings inside her for the boy, and Futaba soon finds herself falling in love with Yuusuke. The two become a couple in Episode 13.
Futaba has a younger sister, Wakaba. She is also the main character in the H-game's second sequel, Green Green 3.
Reika Morimura (森村 麗花, Morimura Reika)
Voiced by: Kana Ueda (Japanese); Alexandra Gerstein (English)
Reika is a mysterious person seems to know about the connection between Midori and Yuusuke. She seems to be intent on keeping the two apart, trying to put Futaba and other girls together with Yuusuke instead. She is noted to have E-cup breasts like Chigusa. Reika's motives are explained near the end of the series. Her given name in Japanese means "lovely flower".
Unlike the other characters, Reika was not in the H-game of Green Green. She was created as a new character for the television series.
Wakaba Kutsuki (朽木 若葉, Kutsuki Wakaba)
Voiced by: Yukiko Mannaka (Japanese); Philece Sampler (English)
Wakaba is Futaba's younger sister. She shows a deep respect for Futaba, referring to her as onee-sama ("honored elder sister").
Wakaba is almost always seen carrying around her potted cactus, whom she named Togemura (literally translated as "thorn village"). Like some devoted plant lovers, Wakaba talks to Togemura as if it were a person; what is unusual is that Togemura appears to be able to communicate with Wakaba as well. Wakaba also uses Togemura as a fortune-telling device and as a weapon to defend herself and her friends, magical girl-style.
Sanae Minami (美南 早苗, Minami Sanae)
Voiced by: Saori Sugimoto (Japanese); Sandy Fox (English)
A friend of Wakaba, Sanae is a weak and shy girl who joins the trip to Kanenone because her doctors believe that the fresh country air will be beneficial to her health. Her need to take medication on a regular basis is highlighted in several episodes.
Sanae has a much younger appearance than the rest of the major female characters. This draws the attention of Tenjin, who has a fetish for "little sister" types. Unfortunately for Tenjin, his unusual and over-enthusiastic advances only frighten Sanae away. It is implied that Sanae begins to develop feelings for Yuusuke after he helps her.
Chigusa Iino (飯野 千種, Iino Chigusa)
Voiced by: Mariko Suzuki (Japanese); Samantha Reynolds (English)
Chigusa is the nurse at the all-girls boarding school. She came along on the trip as the girls' supervisor. The Baka Trio, especially Bacchi-Gū, are enamored by Chigusa's beauty and her E-cup breasts. Although she should be keeping the girls in order, Chigusa is very easy-going and actually encourages the girls to flirt with the boys.
Arisa Haruno (春乃 亜里紗, Haruno Arisa)
Voiced by: Noriko Yoshitake (Japanese); Mari Devon (English)
A brash, bespectacled girl with braided hair who has rather vivid bishōnen sexual fantasies. Her apparent role in the anime is to provide comic relief from the side of the girls. Although her physical attributes manage to attract the attentions of the Baka Trio every now and then, the sight of her face is enough to put an end to any perverted thoughts they may have.
Kenichi Hotta (堀田 健一, Hotta Kenichi)
Voiced by: Hiroshi Kamiya
Kenta Koyasu (子安 ケンタ, Koyasu Kenta)
Voiced by: Akio Takahashi
Yasushi Todoroki (轟 やすし, Todoroki Yasushi)
Voiced by: Akio Takahashi
Itsuki Kobayashi (小林 樹, Kobayashi Itsuki)
Voiced by: Akemi Misaki (OVA)

== OVAs ==
In December 2002, an original video animation (OVA) adaptation of Green Green was released. It had no relation to the television series. It starts off with the same plot, but instead of girls visiting Kanenone, it had a group of boys from Kanenone (Yuusuke, the Baka Trio, and some others) visiting the all-girl boarding school.

Three Character OVA DVDs were also released in Japan under the title Green Green Character DVDs; "Sanae & Wakaba" was released on November 19, 2003, "Futaba & Chigusa" on December 17, 2003, and "Midori & Reika" on January 21, 2004. Each Character DVD included a short 8-10 minute yuri story all of which include a sex or nude scene involving the two female title characters, a music video for each of the title characters, and other extras with a total running time of 33–38 minutes each. In the North American Media Blaster's release most of the contents of the Character DVDs can be found as extras on each DVD with the short stories labeled as untranslated E-cup breasts episodes.

An OVA entitled Green Green: Erolutions (グリーングリーンエロリューションズ) was released in May 2004 as the thirteenth and concluding episode of the television series. The episode was not included in the United States release.

== Episodes ==
No.	Title	Original release date
1	"Hearts Pounding Deep in the Mountains"; Transliteration: "Yamaoku de Dokki-doki" (Japanese: 山奥でどっきどき)	July 12, 2003
A busload of girls from an all-girls school is on its way to Kanenone Gakuen for a month-long trial run of integrating the two schools. At Kanenone, Yuusuke leads the boys in preparing a welcoming party, with the Baka Trio acting as lookouts. Once the bus finally arrives, Midori leaps out, knocking Yuusuke unconscious in her excitement over finally meeting him, and declares that they will change their fate "this time".
2	"You Are Busted"; Transliteration: "Rotenburo de Suttenkororin" (Japanese: 露天風呂ですってんころりん)	July 19, 2003
The girls are dismayed at the antics of the Baka Trio and the spartan facilities at Kanenone, but are cheered up when they discover the place boasts an outdoor hot spring. The Baka Trio decide to peep on the girls as they bathe, while Yuusuke takes it upon himself to stop them.
3	"Lost in the Forest"; Transliteration: "Mori no Naka de Dokkoisho" (Japanese: 森の中でどっこいしょ)	July 26, 2003
Outraged over a prank pulled on her by the Baka Trio, Futaba decides to leave Kanenone for home. In her search for a short cut to the bus stop, she gets lost in the surrounding forest and injures her ankle. Yuusuke, Midori, and the Baka Trio attempt to find and bring her back to Kanenone.
4	"Commotion in the Girls Dorm"; Transliteration: "Joshi Ryō de Tentekomai" (Japanese: 女子寮でてんてこまい)	August 2, 2003
Futaba realizes she is starting to develop feelings for Yuusuke. Midori notices this and confronts Yuusuke about Futaba. That evening, the Baka Trio (and a reluctant Yuusuke) attempt to break into the girls' dormitory while the girls are asleep.
5	"Instant Sleep in the Nurse's Office"; Transliteration: "Okeishitsu de Battankyū" (Japanese: 保健室でばったんきゅー)	August 9, 2003
Sanae misplaces her medicine box, but Yuusuke helps her find it. His good deed is seen and misinterpreted by Reika, who decides to try to bring the two together; and by a jealous Tazio, who enlists the help of the other members of the Baka Trio to come up with a way to win Sanae's heart.
6	"A Steamy Time in the P.E. Equipment Room"; Transliteration: "Taiiku Soko de Atchi-chi" (Japanese: 体育倉庫であっちっち)	August 16, 2003
Midori and Yuusuke are assigned to scout for locations for a school affair. Midori decides to treat the assignment as a date, and gets Reika to promise not to interfere. In order to prevent the Baka Trio from getting in the way, Reika locks them inside the PE storage room, where the heat soon causes them to have vivid hallucinations about the girls they desire.
7	"Splish-Splash by the Pool"; Transliteration: "Pūru Saido de Bisshobisho" (Japanese: プールサイドでびっしょびしょ)	August 23, 2003
After repeated failures to win Futaba's heart by following the dubious recommendations of a dating guidebook, Hikaru turns to Midori for help, with the rest of the Baka Trio in tow. Unfortunately, they take her suggestion to put themselves in the girls' position much too literally.
8	"Morning Bath Free-for-All"; Transliteration: "Asaburo de Suttamonda" (Japanese: 朝風呂ですったもんだ)	August 30, 2003
Alone in the outdoor bath, Reika delivers a surveillance report on Midori and her attempts to attract the interest of Yuusuke. Soon after "signing off", she is joined by Chigusa and the rest of the girls. They all talk about their experiences at Kanenone to date, unaware of the presence of the camouflaged Baka Trio.
9	"Hightailing It out of the Test of Courage"; Transliteration: "Kimo Dameshi de Sutakora Sassa" (Japanese: 肝試しですたこらさっさ)	September 6, 2003
Chigusa organizes a late-night "test of courage", with the boys and girls pairing off. To Midori's dismay, Yuusuke draws Futaba as his partner. Reika sees this as an opportunity to bring Yuusuke and Futaba closer. Meanwhile, the Baka Trio try to take advantage of the girls they were paired with.
10	"Pandemonium In the Library"; Transliteration: "Tosho-shitsu de Dottan Battan" (Japanese: 図書室でどったんばったん)	September 13, 2003
After a failed examination, Chigusa assigns Yuusuke to tutor Midori in the hope of bringing her grades up. As an incentive, she tells Midori that Yuusuke will give her a reward if her test results are above average. Wakaba mishears this, and soon a rumor that getting an above-average test result will allow you to receive a reward from the person you like goes around the entire school. Despite Midori's efforts, however, she falls short of obtaining above-average examination grades. Yuusuke, however, still decides to reward her for trying her best. Midori asks for a hug, and in the process accidentally kisses Yuusuke, which in turn causes him to remember his past memories and feelings for her.
11	"Overwhelmed by Destiny"; Transliteration: "Unmei ni Funyafunya" (Japanese: 運命にふにゃふにゃ)	September 20, 2003
Although Midori and Yuusuke are overjoyed at finding each other again, their unexpected reunion distresses Reika, Futaba, and the Baka Trio for very different reasons.
12	"Farewell Kanenone Gakuen Academy"; Transliteration: "Kanenone ni Sayōnara" (Japanese: 鐘ノ音にサヨウナラ)	September 27, 2003
Confused by the memories of his past life and wary of going against fate, Yuusuke decides it is better for him and Midori to remain separated. Upset by Yuusuke's choice, Midori runs off. Yuusuke goes after her, but seriously injures himself when he saves her from a fall over a cliff. Although the pair are found by the Baka Trio and brought back to Kanenone, bad weather prevents Yuusuke from being transferred to a place with better medical facilities. With Yuusuke's life in the balance, Midori uses her remaining life-force to restore him to health, although she does so at the price of her having to return to her own era. Despite this, she declares her wish to be together again with Yuusuke has come true, as she, through her life-force, will become one with Yuusuke. She and Yuusuke share a final kiss before Reika -- who is revealed to be a messenger of Fate who has been tasked to ensure the lovers remain separated -- takes her back to the 31st century.
13	"Erolutions"; Transliteration: "Eroryūshonzu" (Japanese: エロリューションズ)	May 28, 2004 (DVD)
Several months after the end of the trial run, Chigusa returns to Kanenone for a weekend to prepare for the upcoming school integration. Joining her on the trip is Futaba, who has kept in touch with Yuusuke since her return to her original school. Although Yuusuke and Futaba are both anxious to see each other again, they are unable to admit their feelings for each other. It is up to a dreamworld Midori to give the would-be couple the push they need to take the final step.

== Music ==
Opening Theme:

- "Guri Guri"
  Lyrics by: milktub
  Composition by: milktub
  Arrangement by: Takehiro Wakabe
  Song by: Hiromi Satou

Ending Theme:

- "Blue Sky" (青空, Aozora)
  Lyrics by: milktub
  Composition by: milktub
  Arrangement by: Hitoshi Fujima (Elements Garden)
  Song by: YURIA
