= Super Dodge Ball (1987 video game) =

1987 video game

- North American arcade flyer
- Developer: Technōs Japan
- Publishers: JP: Technōs Japan; NA: Leland Corporation
- Designer: Hiroshi Sato
- Composer: Kazuo Sawa
- Series: Kunio-kun
- Platforms: Arcade, X68000, PC Engine
- Release: Arcade; November 1987; PC Engine: JP: March 30, 1990
- Genre: Sports
- Modes: Single-player, multiplayer

Super Dodge Ball (Note: Released in Japan as Nekketsu Kōkō Dodgeball Bu (熱血高校ドッジボール部, Nekketsu Kōkō Dojjibōru Bu; lit. Hot-Blooded High School Dodgeball Club)) is a 1987 dodgeball video game developed and published by Technōs Japan for arcades. It is the second installment of the Kunio-kun series, with this connection not being present in international versions. It was released in North America by Leland Corporation. It was followed by a Nintendo Entertainment System version with various modifications; a remake for SNK's Neo Geo arcade system was released in 1996 as Technōs Japan's final game.

== Gameplay ==
The arcade version of Nekketsu Kōkō Dodgeball Bu (Japanese version of Super Dodge Ball)

The player's team is composed of seven members: the team's captain (a large-sized character) and six smaller-sized characters. The captain and three of the other members are constrained to one side of the main court, while the other three stand at the sidelines surrounding the competing team. The objective of the game is to eliminate the members of the opposing team on the other side of the court by throwing the ball against them. Players who are eliminated are turned into a caricature of an angel that flies away to the top of the screen. The team that remains with at least one surviving member wins. If time runs out during a match, then the team with most surviving members wins. The player's life bar represents the number of remaining members, as each character is usually eliminated after taking three or four shots.

The game has two button configuration that change functions depending on the current circumstance. If the player currently has possession of the ball, then the left button will be used for throwing the ball against an opponent, while the right button is used for passing the ball to a nearby teammate. Likewise, if an opponent has possession of the ball, then the left button is used to catch or intercept an opponent's throw, while the right button is to duck an attack. Pressing both buttons simultaneously will cause the player to jump. The player can also dash by pushing the joystick left or right twice, increasing the momentum of an offensive throw. The team's captain has a specialized offensive throw, also known as a "Power Shot", that travels faster and does more damage than a regular offensive throw.

The game begins with a match between Dallas and Chicago to determine who will represent the United States in a worldwide dodge ball tournament. In the single-player game, the player will control Dallas, while the computer controls Chicago. If played against a second player, then the first player controls Dallas and the second controls Chicago. The winning team will then compete in the world cup and face against the following regions: England, Iceland, China, Africa (Kenya in later versions) and Japan. The foreign teams have more than four team members playing offense, although only four show up on the main court. If an opposing team loses a member, they will call upon one of their backups to replace the fallen teammate. After defeating Japan, the player's team is awarded with the world cup by a ninja and the game begins a new cycle starting with England.

== Regional differences ==
The Japanese version was released as a spin-off of Nekketsu Kōha Kunio-kun, the Japanese version of Renegade. The Japanese version features an opening sequence which parodies the pre-stage introductions of Kunio-kun which depicts Kunio being struck by a dodge ball thrown by a passing thug and his teammates chasing after said thug. The American teams of Dallas and Chicago were originally the Japanese teams of Nekketsu High School and Hanazono High School, while the final match was actually against U.S. team themselves. The characters' skin tones and hair colors were changed accordingly in the Western version to reflect this. The character who awards the trophy to the player's team at the end of the game is a thinly-disguised parody of the comic book superhero Superman.

== Related games ==
=== Ports ===
A Nintendo Entertainment System version of Super Dodge Ball was released in 1989. However, it is not an exact port, as it featured several differences such as special moves and full stats for individual team members, two additional teams (India and U.S.S.R.), and a "Bean Ball" mode. The soundtrack featured stage music appropriate for each country depicted in the game. For example, the Japan stage theme was "Sakura Sakura" and the England stage featured a song apparently written by marrying two Beatles hits ("Get Back" and "A Hard Day's Night").

The Japan-only X68000 version, an exact port of the arcade release, was released in September 1988. It added stereo music and parallax scrolling, as well as a cheat code that increases the character variations.

Another home version was released exclusively in Japan for the PC Engine titled Nekketsu Kōkō Dodgeball Bu: PC Bangai Hen (熱血高校ドッジボール部 PC番外編; lit. "PC Extra Edition"), released on March 30, 1990. It was published by Naxat Soft and developed by KID. Similar to the NES version, the PC Engine version added individual stats, life gauges, and power shots for each member of every team, but the graphics, teams, and stages are still identical. In addition to the single-player tournament mode and a 2-player versus mode, it also features a single-player quest mode where the player can replace the default members of their team with the captains from the rival teams.

=== Sequels ===
Sequels to Super Dodge Ball have been released for various platforms. A Japan-exclusive Game Boy sequel, titled Nekketsu Kōkō Dodgeball Bu: Kyōteki! Dodge Soldier no Maki (熱血高校ドッジボール部 ～強敵!闘球戦士の巻～, Kyōteki! Dojji Sorujā no Maki; lit. "Fearsome Foe! Tale of the Dodge Soldier"), was released on August 8, 1991. Another Japanese sequel, titled Kunio-kun no Dodgeball da yo Zen'in Shūgō (くにおくんのドッジボールだよ全員集合!; lit. "It's Mr. Kunio's Dodgeball, Gather Everyone!"), was released for the Super Famicom on August 6, 1993. A Neo Geo remake, simply titled Super Dodge Ball, was released in 1996 and co-published with SNK. It was the final game produced by Technōs before they went out of business and as a result, no home version was released and the arcade version was produced in limited quantities.

Years after Technōs went out of business, a new company called Million, composed of former staff members of Technōs Japan, developed Super Dodge Ball Advance for the Game Boy Advance in 2001. It features play mechanics similar to the console installments and some of the same background music as the Kunio-kun series. An official sequel was released by Arc System Works and Aksys Games for the Nintendo DS titled Super Dodgeball Brawlers in 2008.

Miracle Kidz, which was composed of Technōs Japan alumni, released River City Dodgeball All-Stars!! as a doujin game for the PC in 2007. An Xbox 360 version was released in 2009 titled Downtown Smash Dodgeball. Miracle Kidz released the Wii version titled Downtown Nekketsu Dodgeball (ダウンタウン熱血どっじぼーる), on July 12, 2011 as a WiiWare title.

=== Re-releases ===
Hamster Corporation released the arcade version for the PlayStation 2 on January 26, 2006, as part of the Oretachi Gēsen Zoku series. It is an emulation of the original arcade game. The company also released it as part of their Arcade Archives series for the PlayStation 4 in 2015 and Nintendo Switch in 2020.

== Reception ==
In Japan, Game Machine listed Super Dodge Ball on their January 1, 1988 issue as being the second most-successful table arcade unit of the month. The game sold more than 500,000 copies by October 1989.
