= Super Dodge Ball (1996 video game) =

1996 video game

- North American arcade flyer
- Developers: Technōs Japan; Mega Enterprise (PC)
- Publisher: SNK
- Director: Shōichi Toyoshima
- Designer: Masao Shiroto
- Programmer: Makoto Sato
- Artists: Haruyuki Watanabe; Kouji Maruta; Tadashi Maruyama
- Composers: Fumio Suzuki; Robert C. Ashworth; Tadashi Takatsuka
- Series: Kunio-kun
- Platforms: Arcade, Windows
- Release: Arcade: US: 1996; JP: Cancelled; Windows: KR: 2001
- Genre: Sports
- Modes: Single-player, multiplayer
- Arcade system: Neo Geo MVS

Super Dodge Ball (Note: Also known as Kunio no Nekketsu Dodgeball Densetsu (Japanese: くにおの熱血闘球(ドッジボール)伝説, Hepburn: Kunio no Nekketsu Dojjibōru Densetsu; lit. "Kunio's Hot Blooded Dodgeball Legend") in Japan.) is a dodgeball-based sports game produced by Technōs Japan and released for the Neo Geo platform in 1996. It is a sequel to the original Super Dodge Ball and features characters from Technōs Japan's Kunio-kun series. It was also the final game developed by Technōs before the company went out of business, as well as the last Kunio-kun games released in arcades. Technōs location tested a Japanese version in arcades, but since the company went bankrupt, this version was not released and the game was only given a limited US release from SNK, although putting a US cart of this game into a Japanese system will show the Japanese version. In 2001, Mega Enterprise ported this game to the PC exclusively for a Korean release.

== Gameplay ==
Gameplay screenshot

The rules of the game are similar to that of the original arcade version of Super Dodge Ball. Two teams battle each other out, with each team restricted to their side of the court, attacking each other with a ball, until all the members of one team are all eliminated. This time, teams are composed of only three members: a captain and two teammates. When a character's vitality gauge runs out completely, instead of being eliminated completely from the match, they are moved to the opposing team's outfield, where they can still assist their remaining teammates by attacking them from within the opposing side of the court. The Power Shots in the game are now performed by inputting fighting game-style commands. The captains in each team have two Power Shots, a Counter Shot, a Special Pass, and a Super Power Shot that can only be performed when the team's power gauge is completely filled. The generic teammates only have one power shot each.

The controls of the game changes depending on whether the player's team is in possession with the ball (offense) or without it (defense). During offense mode, the player can shoot the ball at the opposing team, pass it to a teammate, jump, or feint a shot. In defense mode, the player can try to catch an opponent's shot, crouch to avoid, jump, or provoke. Pressing the A and B simultaneously in defense mode will cause the player's current character to charge the power gauge (which is normally filled when the player performs Power Shots). When two members of opposing teams pick up the ball at the same, they will be prompted to press any button rapidly until one character overpowers the other and gets a free shot.

In the single-player mode, the player starts out by choosing from one of seven teams and then face against the other teams. The tournament starts out at the player's home court against a Zako (small fry) team consisting of generic characters. Afterward, the player will face against the other six main teams. When the player defeats one of the main teams, they will be asked whether or not to accept the defeated team's captain in their team. If the player accepts, the defeated opponent will replace of the teammates besides the captain. The penultimate match will be a team consist exclusively of team captains, while the final match is against the computer-only character D.B. Maou.

=== Characters ===
The captains of the seven playable teams includes the main characters from Nekketsu Kōha Kunio-kun (the Japanese version of Renegade) and two new characters (Miyuki and Kenji).

==== Captains ====
Kunio (v.b. Ryō Horikawa)
A tough guy from Nekketsu High School, his Power Shots are the Nekketsu Nut Shot and the Nekketsu Rolling Shot. His Super Shot is the Nekketsu Royal Strike. He is an all-around type character, and his default teammates are Kamekichi and Musashi.
Miyuki (v.b. Yuka Koyama)
A pink-haired pig-tailed schoolgirl who works at an amusement park, her Power Shots are the Mega Wendies and the Mouse Flash. Her Super Shot is the Love Merry Go-Round. She is a speed type character, and her teammates are Keiko and Kaede.
Sabu (v.b. Yukimasa Kishino)
A Yakuza boss who fought against Kunio in the past, his Power Shots are the Jingi Whirl and Yakuza Fire. His Super Shot is the Ninkyo Explosion. He is a skill type character, and his teammates are Akemi and Takuya.
Kenji (v.b. Tōru Furuya)
A homeless teenage boy with matching-colored green pants and beret, his Power are the Muscle Killer and Royal Gust Shot. His Super Shot is the Friendly Rolling. He is a power type character, and his teammates are Makoto and Jyoji.
Shinji (v.b. Hisao Egawa)
The leader of a bōsōzoku gang, his Power Shots are Bari-Bari Riding and Rori-Rori Rolling. His Super Shot is Bari-Bari Touring. He is a skill type character, and his teammates are Hiromitsu and Akira.
Misuzu (v.b. Keiko Yamamoto)
The leader of an all-girl gang, she resembles a hulking middle-aged lady despite being a high school student herself. Her Power Shots are Hyakkan Love and Sexy in the Sky. Her Super Shot is the Dynamite Hip. She is a speed type character, and her teammates are Gonzou and Kiyoshi.
Riki (v.b. Masaaki Ōkura)
Kunio's friendly rival, the guardian of Hanazono High School, his Power Shots are the Skylark Shot and the Mach Shot. His Super Shot is the Burning Upper. He is all-around type character, and his teammates are Kozue and Ushimaru.
D.B. Maou (v.b. Daisuke Gōri)
The final opponent in the single-player mode, he planned the tournament in order to rid the world of dodgeball. He revives himself in a new form after being defeated once. His teammates are named Daa and Boo.

==== Teammates ====
There are five types of generic teammates in the game. Each team has two generic teammates and the Zako Team in the beginning of the single-player mode consists entirely of generic types who are not in the player's team.

Nerd-types
Resembles a scrawny teenage boy in a Japanese school uniform and eyeglasses. Kamekichi, Kaede, and Makoto are of this type.
Fat guy-types
Resembles a bald middle-aged man in a tank top. Musashi, Hiromitsu, and Gonzou are of this type.
Athletic girl-types
Resembles a short-haired teenage girl in a volleyball uniform. Keiko, Akemi, and Kozue are of this type.
Delinquent-types
Wears a sports jacket with shades and a pompadour hairstyle. Takuya, Jyoji, and Akira are of this type.
Jock-types
Resembles a middle-aged man in rugby gear. Kiyoshi and Ushimaru are of this type, as well as D.B. Maou's two teammates (Daa and Boo).

==== Non-player characters ====
Angela (v.b. Sara Nakayama)
The game's announcer and referee, she is the daughter of D.B. Maou, who wants to prevent her father from destroying the sports of dodgeball.

== Reception ==
Reception

Review score
Publication	Score
MAN!AC	32%

Engadget gave an overall positive outlook to the game.
