= Super Dodge Ball Advance =

2001 video game

- Developer: Million Co. Ltd.
- Publishers: JP: Atlus; NA: Atlus USA; EU: Ubi Soft
- Platform: Game Boy Advance
- Release: JP: March 21, 2001; NA: June 11, 2001; EU: November 16, 2001
- Genre: Sports game
- Modes: Single-player, multiplayer

Super Dodge Ball Advance (Note: Known in Japan as Bakunetsu Dodgeball Fighters (Japanese: 爆熱ドッジボールファイターズ, Hepburn: Bakunetsu Dojjibōru Faitāzu; lit. Burning Heat Dodgeball Fighters).) is a dodge ball video game produced by Atlus and Ubi Soft that was released for the Game Boy Advance in 2001. It is a spin-off of the Super Dodge Ball series although it does not feature the Kunio-kun characters, despite it being licensed to Atlus by the then successor of Technōs Japan, Million Co., Ltd.

== Gameplay ==
Initially, Team Heroes is the only playable team in the tournament mode, but other teams can be unlocked as well through repeated playthroughs. After defeating all the dream teams in the tournament, the player can compete against a clone version of their time for the final match. Each team consists of eight members, though only seven are allowed to play. The player assigns each member of their team by position, with four members within the inner court and three on the outer court. Each character has a stat for Throw Power, Throw Speed, Throw Control, Agility, Jump, Catch, Dodge, Toughness, Will and Stamina.

Each character has two special attacks. The first can be performed by running and throwing the ball on the third step, or by doing a running jump and then pressing. There are 50 types of special moves in all. A feature previously introduced in Kunio-kun no Dodgeball Dayo Zen'in Shūgō and carried over to this game is the ability to perform tag team attacks, which allows the player to deal extra damage by performing an attack with multiple characters and having them jump into the opposing team's side of the inner court.

=== Teams and members ===
The teams in Bakunetsu Dodgeball Fighters were originally Japanese-centric, but were given mixed nationalities in Super Dodge Ball Advance. Each team can be renamed and the nationality of Team Heroes can be assigned as well.

Team Heroes: (Description: "This is your main team. It is a team with good team work with Ken as the captain. How good the team is depends on you") Characters are: Ken (Captain), Tom, Paul, Ben, Neal, Fred, David and Jack.

China Dragons: (Description: "This team does not have any outstanding plays, but their balanced team follows the basics of dodge ball") This team consists of: Lee (Captain), Chen, Lian, Chao, Wang, Tsai, Mao, and Dung.

England Knights: (Description: "James, Harry, Scott, and Goaty are brothers and their team coordination is outstanding") This team consists of: James (Captain), Harry, Scott, Henry, Roger, Peter, Cliff, and Goaty.

USA Braves: (Description: "This is a very strong willed team. His team has the potential to go all the way to the top") This team consists of: Sam (captain), John, Mike, Randy, Bill, Steve (one of the main characters), Jim, and Dick.

Australia Stars: (Description: "The players on this team are popular among girls for their good looks. Chad can catch just about anything") The team consists of: Chad (Captain), Will, Miles, Todd and Ted (two other main characters), Bobby, Colin, and Dude.

Russia Bears: (Description: "The captain of the team is Boris, he is an outstanding player, but the other players need some improvement") The team consists of: Boris, Ivan, Vlade, Pavel, Igor, Andre, Volf, and Yakov.

Holland Angels: (Description: "A team with very high stamina. This team can take a beating!") This team consists of: Dirk (Captain), Franz, Gino, Hank, Fritz, Johann, Rolf, and Der.

Japan Ninjas: (Description: "Their acrobatic style of play reminds you of a ninja") Team consists of: Fuji (Captain), Sato, Honda, Aoki, Oda, Hino, Inoki, Hori, Baba.

Canada Foxes: (Description: "Their wild style of play can get them into trouble but they usually get the job done") Team consists of: Roy (Captain), Sid, Troy, Lyle, Clark, Bruce, Ray, Gage.

Korea Bombers: (Description: "This team is rich with tradition. Many great players have come out of this team. Li's super throw is powerful") Team consists of: Li (Captain), Chung, Han, Kim, Pak, Choi, Soo, and Rhee.

The Dream Teams are: Shooters, Rockets, Ironmen, Warriors, and Team Atlus.

=== Super Throws ===
There are 50 super throws available. Pressing B on the 3rd step after dashing results in a Dash Super Throw. Pressing the B Button at the peak of a Dash Jump results in a Jump Super Throw. Each character has two super throws. Among the 50 super throws, there are 2 exclusive super throws, which are available on only very few characters: the Random Throw, which is exclusive to one character, and the Copy Throw, which is usable by two characters. Copy Throw allows a character to perform the last super throw the opponent executed, whilst Random Throw will randomly select and perform any of the other 49 super throws (including Copy Throw).

Other Super Throws include:

1. Mach Throw: The character throws the ball at high speeds at an opponent.
2. Wide Shot: The character throws the ball, which splits into 7 and covers a wide range of space.
3. Surpriser: The character appears to pass the ball, which then quickly moves towards the opponent.
4. Plague Shot: A countless number of balls cover the opponent and inflate, as if they are absorbing the opponent's health.
5. Funky Throw: An unpredictable throw that can throw an opponent's timing off, making it difficult to catch.
6. Seven Way: The ball splits into seven separate balls and flies around the court, with an unpredictable movement pattern.

== Reception ==
Reception

Aggregate score
Aggregator	Score
Metacritic	79/100

Review scores
Publication	Score
AllGame	4.5/5
Edge	4/10
Electronic Gaming Monthly	6.67/10 (Note: Three critics of Electronic Gaming Monthly gave the game each a score of 8/10, 5/10, and 7/10.)
EP Daily	9/10
Game Informer	9/10
GameSpot	7.1/10
GameSpy	79%
IGN	6.5/10
Next Generation	4/5
Nintendo Power	4/5
Nintendo World Report	6.5/10

Super Dodge Ball Advance received "generally favorable reviews", according to the review aggregation website Metacritic.

IGN praised the game's core elements but thought the game was overly complex in comparison to the NES entry in the franchise. GameSpot wrote that while the game was fast, colorful, and fun, the two-player mode felt rushed, the single-player mode was repetitive, and the game could have benefited from refinement. Nintendo World Report praised game's the multiplayer, music, artwork, and criticized the lack of options, replayability of the single-player mode, shallow gameplay, repetitive enemies, and failure to capitalize on its potential. NextGen cited the gameplay and the controls as a high points of the game. Uncle Dust of GamePro gave a praise to the game for its graphics, controls, and the variety of challenges in the single-player mode. (Note: GamePro gave the game 4/5 for graphics, 3.5/5 for sound, 5/5 for control, and 4.5/5 for fun factor.)
