= Maximum Football (2025 video game) =

Gridiron video game

- Cover art featured on Steam
- Developer: Invictus Games
- Publisher: Maximum Entertainment
- Series: Maximum Football
- Engine: Unreal Engine 5
- Platforms: Xbox Series X and Series S, Microsoft Windows, MacOS, PlayStation 5
- Release: WW: June 17, 2025
- Genre: Sports
- Mode: Single-player

Maximum Football is a gridiron football video game developed by Invictus Games and published by Maximum Entertainment. It is the successor to Maximum Football 2020, which was formerly developed by Canuck Play. Modus Games acquired the rights to the Maximum Football series and announced the successor on September 1, 2021, on Discord. Modus Games would make a formal announcement about the game's development on February 7, 2022.

The game was released on June 17, 2025 for Steam, Xbox Series X and Series S, and PlayStation 5 after an early access period on Xbox and Steam that began on November 7, 2024. The team behind the game released an official trailer on February 7, 2023, one year after the original statement. This is the first game under the new developer/publisher regime and to not include former professional player Doug Flutie. The game was originally scheduled to be released in the spring of 2023 for Windows and Mac OS but was delayed for all platforms until further notice on May 26, 2023.

The game is free-to-play which makes it one of the first triple-A sports video games to not have a price attached to it. The game is often compared to and rivaled to the EA Sports flagship National Football League title, Madden NFL which has drawn criticism for its lack of features that were featured in previous games. This comes after the hashtag #FixMaddenFranchise was trending on Twitter and other social media platforms to spread awareness of EA Sports' lack of attention to the game mode. Madden NFL is the only game with the exclusive NFL license to include the likenesses of players and coaches into the game.

== Development ==
The game was developed by Invictus Games. Many videos were posted to the Maximum Football Twitter account showcasing the creation of tackling animations and other animations that would be present in the game. An update video after the announcement of the game was released on June 30, 2022, which showed developer Micah Brown showing some of the customization, physics and gameplay features in the new game. In September 2022, another development update was posted showing specifically the customization features in the game which differ from other sports games such as NBA 2K, Madden NFL and MLB: The Show. This would all lead up to the official trailer being released on February 7, 2023, where a release date was set for PC and console.

Modus Games is a video game publisher based in the United States, known for its diverse range of titles across various platforms. The company was founded in 2017 and has quickly established itself as a leading publisher in the indie game space, partnering with developers from around the world to bring their games to a wider audience. Modus Games has published a variety of critically acclaimed titles, including Trine 4: The Nightmare Prince, Remothered: Tormented Fathers, and Cris Tales, which was nominated for multiple awards at The Game Awards 2020.

On March 20, 2023, multiple videos and screenshots were leaked on social media sites such as Discord, YouTube, Twitter and Reddit showing gameplay from early beta tests conducted by Modus Games. On May 26, 2023, the game was delayed for PC due to the readiness of the project being in question.

== Features ==
The game features multiple modes not seen before in the series, such as pro season mode where players can play through a professional season in a 32-team league, similar to the NFL regular season. Players can also advance into the playoffs through a similar style of the NFL playoffs. There is also a head to head mode where one player can play against another player using created teams or default randomized rosters.

The other featured mode is dynasty, which derives from the recently revived NCAA Football video game series, where players can take on the role of a head coach in a customizable league and recruit players to join their team and get drafted. Other modes that may come in the future of the game will be a career mode similar to the one in older Madden titles called 'Superstar'.
