= Maximum Football 2020 =

2020 video game

- Cover art featuring Doug Flutie
- Developer: Canuck Play Inc
- Publisher: Spear Interactive Inc / Maximum Games
- Designer: David Winter
- Series: Maximum Football
- Engine: Unity
- Platforms: PlayStation 4, Xbox One
- Release: September 25, 2020
- Genre: Sports
- Modes: Single-player, multiplayer

Doug Flutie's Maximum Football 2020 is a gridiron football video game developed and published by Canuck Play. It is the sequel to Maximum Football 2019 and the predecessor to Maximum Football (2025). The game was released on September 25, 2020, for PlayStation 4, and Xbox One.

== Sequel ==
On February 7, 2022, publisher Modus Games announced plans to release their next sequel Maximum Football as a free-to-play title which is also under development by Invictus Games. The sim is currently being built in Unreal Engine 5 and is planned to by released on PC, PS4, PS5, Xbox One, and Xbox Series platforms on an unspecified date. However, Steam players can expect the game to enter early access sometime this spring.
