= Give It Up =

Give It Up may refer to:

== Literature ==
- "Give It Up!" (short story), a story by Franz Kafka
- Give It Up! (comics), an adaptation of nine short stories by Kafka

== Music ==
=== Albums ===
- Give It Up (Bonnie Raitt album), 1972
- Give It Up (Jimmy Lyons album), 1985

=== Songs ===
- "Give It Up" (The Good Men song), 1992
- "Give It Up" (Hothouse Flowers song), 1990
- "Give It Up" (KC and the Sunshine Band song), 1983
- "Give It Up" (Nathan Sykes song), 2016
- "Give It Up" (Public Enemy song), 1994
- "Give It Up" (Talk Talk song), 1986
- "Give It Up" (Twista song), 2007
- "Give It Up" (Wilson Phillips song), 1992
- "Give It Up" (ZZ Top song), 1991
- "Give It Up", by AC/DC from Stiff Upper Lip
- "Give It Up", by Alice Cooper from Constrictor
- "Give It Up", by Avalon from Avalon
- "Give It Up", by Badfinger from Badfinger
- "Give It Up", by Boney M. from Eye Dance
- "Give It Up", by Datarock from Red
- "Give It Up", by The Jacksons from Triumph
- "Give It Up", by Jacynthe
- "Give It Up", by Kevin Aviance
- "Give It Up", by LCD Soundsystem from LCD Soundsystem
- "Give It Up", by Midtown from Forget What You Know
- "Give It Up", by Pepper from Kona Town
- "Give It Up", by Steve Miller Band from Abracadabra
- "Give It Up", from the Victorious TV series soundtrack

== Television episodes ==
- "Give It Up" (8 Simple Rules)
- "Give It Up" (Doctors)
- "Give It Up" (Noah's Arc)
- "Give It Up" (Shake It Up)

== Other uses ==
- Give It Up! (video game), a rhythm video game released in 2014

== See also ==
- "Give It Up to Me", a song by Shakira
- "Give It Up or Turnit a Loose", a song by James Brown
- "Give It Up, Turn It Loose", a song by En Vogue
- Givin' It Up, a 2006 album by George Benson and Al Jarreau
- Give Up (disambiguation)
- Give It All Up (disambiguation)
- Giving Up (disambiguation)
