= Maximum Games =

American video game publisher

Maximum Games, Inc.
- Logo used from 2021 to 2024
- Formerly: Maximum Family Games, LLC (2009–2012)
- Type: Subsidiary
- Industry: Video games
- Founded: August 2009; 17 years ago
- Founders: Christina Seelye; Len Ciciretto
- Headquarters: Walnut Creek, California, United States
- Area served: International
- Number of employees: 60–70
- Parent: Maximum Entertainment (2021–present)
- Website: maximumgames.com

Maximum Games, Inc. is an American video game publisher based in Walnut Creek, California. Originally founded in 2009 as a publisher of family-oriented titles for the Nintendo DS and Nintendo Wii, the company shifted to publishing games of all genres for all ages across all platforms shortly after inception.

Maximum Games has acted as a sub-publisher and North American distributor for many other major video game publishers including Nacon, Microids, Funcom, and Focus Home Interactive. Some of the most notable franchises they have partnered on include the Farming Simulator series, Five Nights at Freddy's, Bendy and the Ink Machine, Power Rangers: Battle for the Grid, Divinity: Original Sin, and the WRC series.

Logo Used from 2009 to 2012

Maximum Games expanded into funding and development with a new publishing label in 2018 called Modus Games. In 2019, the company acquired its first studio, Brazilian-based The Balance, Inc. and rebranded it as Modus Studios Brazil. In 2021, the company was acquired by Swedish firm Zordix. In 2024, Maximum Games was grouped together with several other related publisher labels under the parent brand Maximum Entertainment, the new name of Zordix.

== History ==
Maximum Games is a privately held California corporation, and was founded as Maximum Family Games in 2009 by Christina Seelye and Len Ciciretto. During the 2009 holiday season, the company launched two successful Nintendo DS titles, Junior Brain Trainer and Junior Classic Games, with placement in major US retailers. In 2010, the company published 16 new products for the Nintendo DS, Wii and PC platforms. In the same year, the company was granted third-party publishing status with Nintendo of America and Sony Computer Entertainment America, and in 2011, they were granted the same status in Europe with both companies. In 2012, the company also secured its license with Microsoft. That May, the company legally changed its name to Maximum Games.

Following the rebrand, Maximum Games began rapidly expanding into sales and physical distribution in North America for European publishers, specifically for the seventh console generation. The company's output averaged around eight releases per year, handling packaging, third-party logistics, and negotiating with retailers to secure placements for physical releases. By 2015, the company had invested $2.5 million in future games and shipped a total of 1 million units across all releases.

In March 2016, Maximum Games acquired UK-based video game publisher and distributor Avanquest Software Publishing Ltd. The acquisition marked Maximum's move to expand distribution of its games globally, establishing a European sales and marketing position. During this time, they also established a second European subsidiary, Maximum Games Ireland Limited.

In 2017, Maximum Games began development of its first fully owned IP, Extinction, which released in the following year. The expansion into development would lay the foundation for its publishing label Modus Games, focusing on AAA publishing services for independent developers. During this same time, the company further developed its European network of partners and retailers, offering games in over 30+ countries.

In 2018, Len Ciciretto transitioned out of the company and is no longer a shareholder.

In October 2020, Maximum Games entered an agreement with Nacon to handle third-party logistics for their lineup of RIG computer and gaming accessories.

Maximum Games began offering direct-to-consumer shipping from its own digital storefront in December 2020. It currently sells partner titles, Modus Games titles, and store exclusive collector's editions.

The company was purchased by Swedish firm Zordix AB in November 2021, for a total of $42 million, with additional earnouts of up to $30 million.

On January 20, 2022, Mane6 announced that they were purchased by Maximum Games.

In February 2023, Zordix consolidated Dimfrost, Invictus Games, Mane6, Modus Brazil, and Zordix Racing to create Modus Studios. It also acquired FUN Labs. The company further consolidated in February 2024, announcing that publishers Maximum Games, Modus Games, Just For Games, and Merge Games, and developer Modus Studios would all be grouped under the name Maximum Entertainment, the new name of Zordix.

== Modus Games ==
In December 2017, Maximum Games created a new division of the company called Modus Games, focused on providing full-service publishing services to independent video game developers. Modus Games' first title published was the action adventure title Extinction, developed by Iron Galaxy.

In 2019, Modus Games purchased the independent Brazilian game studio The Balance, Inc., which it previously partnered with to publish the action game Override: Mech City Brawl. The company was rebranded as Modus Studios Brazil and operates independently of the publishing arm, offering porting, development support, and development of original IPs.

=== History ===
Modus Games was first introduced in 2018 when the company was soft launched with the release of Iron Galaxy's Extinction. The company was fully launched in March 2019. Their first title as a publishing label was Finnish developer Frozenbyte's Trine 4: The Nightmare Prince, which received favorable reviews.

Modus Games has since partnered with several developers of varying sizes for both physical and digital releases globally. The company has made their first foray into the collectibles market with the announcement of a collector's edition for Dreams Uncorporated's action role-playing game Cris Tales.

In October 2020, Modus Games initiated an ongoing charitable initiative called Games Giving Back, in which the company donates a portion of each games' profits towards a charity, often in a similar theme to each game being highlighted. The first of these donations was to the Exceptional Women Awardees Foundation, an organization that helps women advance their careers through coaching and mentorship.

In January 2022, Modus Games acquired Mane6, the development team behind Them's Fightin' Herds.

=== Modus Studios Brazil ===
Following the release of Override: Mech City Brawl by Brazilian studio The Balance, Inc., Modus Games purchased and rebranded the developer as Modus Studios Brazil in 2019. The company operates independently of the publishing arm, and has since released a sequel titled Override 2: Super Mech League. It is the company's first developer acquisition under the Modus name. In addition to development, the studio also co-develops and offers porting services for other Modus published games.

=== List of Modus games ===
Games published and/or developed

Year	Title	Platform(s)	Developer(s)	Role	Publisher(s)
2018	Extinction	Windows, PlayStation 4, Xbox One	Iron Galaxy	Publisher	Maximum Games, Modus Games
2018	Ninjin: Clash of Carrots	Windows, PlayStation 4, Xbox One, Nintendo Switch	Pocket Trap	Publisher	Modus Games
2018	Override: Mech City Brawl	Windows, PlayStation 4, Xbox One, Nintendo Switch	Modus Studios Brazil (formerly The Balance, Inc.)	Publisher, Developer	Modus Games, 3goo
2019	Trine 4: The Nightmare Prince, Trine: Ultimate Collection	Windows, PlayStation 4, Xbox One, Nintendo Switch	Frozenbyte	Publisher	Modus Games
2019	Bear with Me: The Lost Robots, The Complete Collection	Windows, PlayStation 4, Xbox One, Nintendo Switch, Android, iOS	Exordium Games	Publisher	Modus Games (Note: Published iOS and Android release), Exordium Games
2019	Degrees of Separation	Windows, PlayStation 4, Xbox One, Nintendo Switch	Moondrop	Publisher	Modus Games
2020	Ary and the Secret of Seasons	Windows, PlayStation 4, Xbox One, Nintendo Switch, Stadia	eXiin, Fishing Cactus	Publisher	Modus Games
2020	Skully	Windows, PlayStation 4, Xbox One, Nintendo Switch	Finish Line Games	Publisher	Modus Games
2020	Them's Fightin' Herds	Windows, iOS, Linux (Note: Linux port was released in 2021, not 2020. Modus acquired Mane6 in January 2022 and divested it to Gameplay Group International in 2025.)	Mane6	Publisher	Modus Games
2020	Lost Words: Beyond the Page	Windows, PlayStation 4, Xbox One, Nintendo Switch, Stadia	Sketchbook Games	Publisher	Modus Games
2020	Super Animal Royale	Windows, macOS, Nintendo Switch, Playstation 4, Playstation 5, Xbox One, Xbox Series X/S, Stadia	Pixile Studios	Publisher	Modus Games (Self-published by Pixile Studios as of May 8, 2024)
2020	Override 2: Super Mech League	Windows, PlayStation 5, PlayStation 4, Xbox Series X, Xbox One, Nintendo Switch	Modus Studios Brazil (formerly The Balance, Inc.)	Publisher, Developer	Modus Games
2020	Remothered: Broken Porcelain	Windows, PlayStation 4, Xbox One, Nintendo Switch	Stormind Games	Publisher	Modus Games
2020	Rock of Ages 3: Make & Break	Windows, PlayStation 4, Xbox One, Nintendo Switch, Stadia	ACE Team, Giant Monkey Robot	Publisher	
2021	Rustler	Windows, PlayStation 5, PlayStation 4, Xbox Series X, Xbox One, Nintendo Switch		Publisher	Modus Games, PlayWay
2021	Cris Tales	Windows, PlayStation 5, PlayStation 4, Xbox Series X, Xbox One, Nintendo Switch, Stadia	Dreams Uncorporated, SYCK	Publisher	Modus Games
2021	In Sound Mind	Windows, PlayStation 5, Xbox Series X, Nintendo Switch	We Create Stuff	Publisher	Modus Games
2022	Soulstice	Windows, PlayStation 5, Xbox Series X	Reply Game Studios	Publisher	Modus Games
	Kukoos: Lost Pets	Windows, PlayStation 4, Nintendo Switch	Petit Fabrik	Publisher	Modus Games
2023	Teslagrad Remastered	Windows, Linux, macOS PlayStation 4, PlayStation 5, Xbox One, Xbox Series X/S, Switch	Rain Games	Publisher	Modus Games
2023	Teslagrad 2	Windows, PlayStation 4, PlayStation 5, Xbox One, Xbox Series X/S, Switch	Rain Games	Publisher	Modus Games
2023	Double Dragon Gaiden: Rise of the Dragons	Windows, PlayStation 4, PlayStation 5, Xbox One, Xbox Series X/S, Switch	Secret Base, Arc System Works	Publisher	Modus Games
2023	Hammerwatch: Anniversary Edition	Windows, PlayStation 4, PlayStation 5, Xbox One, Xbox Series X/S, Switch	Crackshell	Publisher	Modus Games
2023	Hammerwatch II	Windows, PlayStation 4, PlayStation 5, Xbox One, Xbox Series X/S, Switch	Crackshell	Publisher	Modus Games
2023	Paleo Pines	Windows, PlayStation 4, PlayStation 5, Xbox One, Xbox Series X/S, Switch	Italic Pig	Publisher	Modus Games
2024	Until Then	Windows, Linux, PlayStation 5	Polychroma Games	Publisher	Maximum Entertainment
2025	Maximum Football	Windows, PlayStation 5, Xbox Series X|S	Invictus Games	Publisher	Maximum Entertainment

== List of video games ==
Games published and/or developed

Year	Title	Platform(s)	Developer(s)	Role	Publisher(s)
2010	Mystery Quest: Curse of the Ancient Spirits	Nintendo DS	cerasus.media	Publisher	Maximum Family Games
2010	Junior Brain Trainer: Math Edition	Nintendo DS	Uacari	Publisher	Maximum Family Games
2010	City Builder	Windows	Collision Studios	Publisher	Maximum Family Games
2010	Junior Brain Trainer 2	Nintendo DS	Sanuk Games	Publisher	Avanquest Software, Maximum Games (Note: Published North American release)
2010	Maximum Racing: Drag & Stock Racer	Wii	Brain in a Jar	Publisher	Maximum Family Games (Note: Published North American Nintendo Wii ports of Brain in a Jar's PlayStation 2 games.), Nordic Games
2010	Maximum Racing: Crash Car Racer	Wii	Brain in a Jar	Publisher	Maximum Family Games, Nordic Games
2010	Maximum Racing: Super Truck Racer	Wii	Brain in a Jar	Publisher	Maximum Family Games, Nordic Games
2010	Maximum Racing: GP Classic Racing	Wii	Brain in a Jar	Publisher	Maximum Family Games, Nordic Games
2010	Maximum Racing: Rally Racer	Wii	Brain in a Jar	Publisher	Maximum Family Games, Nordic Games
2011	Maximum Racing: Super Karts	Wii	Brain in a Jar	Publisher	Maximum Family Games, Nordic Games
2011	Let's Dance	Xbox 360, PlayStation 3, Wii	Lightning Fish Games	Publisher	Maximum Family Games (Note: Published North American release), Black Bean
2011	Atlantic Quest	Windows, macOS, Nintendo DS, Nintendo 3DS	rokapublish	Publisher	rokapublish, Avanquest Software, Maximum Games (Note: Published 2014 Nintendo 3DS release)
2011	Veggy World	Nintendo DS, Wii	CyberPlanet Interactive	Publisher	Virtual Play, Maximum Family Games (Note: Published Nintendo DS release)
2011	Junior Mystery Quest	Nintendo DS	Uacari	Publisher	Maximum Family Games
2011	Hoppie	Nintendo DS	Jack of All Games	Publisher	Maximum Family Games
2011	Junior Island Adventure	Nintendo DS	CyberPlanet Interactive	Publisher	Maximum Family Games
2011	Jewel Link Chronicles: Mountains of Madness	Nintendo DS	cerasus.media	Publisher	Maximum Family Games (Note: Published North American release),rondomedia
2012	50 Classic Games 3D	Nintendo 3DS	cerasus.media	Publisher	Maximum Family Games
2012	Junior Classic Games 3D	Nintendo 3DS	cerasus.media	Publisher	Maximum Family Games (Note: Published North American release),rondomedia
2012	Myst	Nintendo 3DS	Cyan, Hoplite Research (Note: Developed Nintendo 3DS Myst port)	Publisher	Maximum Family Games (Note: Published North American release), Funbox Media
2012	Deer Drive Legends	Nintendo 3DS, Wii, Windows, Nintendo Switch	Raylight	Publisher	Maximum Family Games
2012	American Mensa Academy	Nintendo 3DS, Wii, PlayStation 3, Xbox 360, Windows	Silverball Studios	Publisher	Square Enix, Maximum Games (Note: Published North American Wii release)
2012	Air Conflicts: Pacific Carriers	PlayStation 3, Xbox 360, Windows, Linux, macOS, PlayStation 4	Games Farm	Publisher	Maximum Games, bitComposer Games
2012	Legends of War: Patton	PlayStation 3, Xbox 360, Windows, PlayStation Vita	Enigma Software, Pandora Plays	Publisher	Maximum Games
2013	Putty Squad	Windows, Nintendo 3DS, PlayStation 3, PlayStation 4, PlayStation Vita, Xbox 360	System 3	Publisher	System 3, Maximum Games (Note: Published North American release in 2014)
2014	Lichdom: Battlemage	Windows, PlayStation 4, Xbox One	Xaviant, Bigmoon Entertainment	Publisher	Xaviant, Maximum Games (Note: Published console release in 2016)
2014	Crab Cakes Rescue	Wii U, macOS, Windows	Mission Critical Games	Publisher	Maximum Games
2015	Let's Sing 2016	Wii, PlayStation 4, Xbox One, Windows	Voxler	Publisher	Koch Media, Maximum Games (Note: Published North American release), System 3, Plug In Digital
2016	Alekhine's Gun	PlayStation 4, Xbox One, Windows	Maximum Games (Note: Originally being developed by Haggard Games from 2010 to 2014; Maximum's first in-house title.)	Developer, Publisher	Maximum Games
2016	Loading Human: Chapter 1	PlayStation VR, Oculus Rift, Oculus Rift S, HTC Vive	Untold Games	Publisher	Maximum Games
2016	Mark McMorris Infinite Air	PlayStation 4, Xbox One, Windows	HB Studios	Publisher	Maximum Games
2017	Troll and I	PlayStation 4, Xbox One, Windows, Nintendo Switch	Spiral House	Publisher	Maximum Games
2017	ArmaGallant: Decks of Destiny	PlayStation 4	Rock Nano Global	Publisher	Maximum Games
2017	The Golf Club 2	PlayStation 4, Xbox One, Windows	HB Studios	Publisher	Maximum Games
2017	Dead Alliance	PlayStation 4, Xbox One, Windows	IllFonic, Psyop	Publisher	Maximum Games
2017	Road Rage	PlayStation 4, Xbox One, Windows	Team6 Game Studios	Publisher	Maximum Games
2018	Beast Quest	PlayStation 4, Xbox One, Windows, Nintendo Switch	Torus Games	Publisher	Maximum Games
2018	Tyler: Model 005	Xbox One, Windows	Reversed Interactive	Publisher	Maximum Games
2020	Street Power Football	PlayStation 4, Xbox One, Windows, Nintendo Switch, Stadia	Gamajun Games, SFL Interactive	Publisher	Maximum Games
2021	Curved Space	PlayStation 4, PlayStation 5, Xbox One, Xbox Series X/S, Windows, Nintendo Switch	Only By Midnight	Publisher	Maximum Games
2022	In Nightmare	PlayStation 4, PlayStation 5, Windows	Magic Fish Studio	Publisher	Maximum Games
2022	Fobia: St. Dinfna Hotel	PlayStation 4, PlayStation 5, Xbox One, Xbox Series X/S, Windows	Pulsatrix Studios	Publisher	Maximum Games

Distributed games

- A Plague Tale: Innocence
- Bendy and the Ink Machine
- Call of Cthulhu
- Canada Hunt
- Car Mechanic Simulator 2018
- Clair Obscur: Expedition 33
- Conan Exiles
- Farming Simulator series
- Five Nights at Freddy's: Help Wanted
- Five Nights at Freddy's: Help Wanted 2
- Five Nights at Freddy's: Security Breach
- The Golf Club 2
- GreedFall
- Infinite Air with Mark McMorris
- Kena: Bridge of Spirits
- Minecraft: Story Mode
- Nickelodeon Kart Racers
- Outcast: Second Contact
- Power Rangers: Battle for the Grid
- Remothered: Broken Porcelain
- The Serious Sam Collection
- The Sinking City
- SnowRunner
- Spintires: MudRunner
- The Surge
- Tchia: Oléti Edition
- Vampyr
- Werewolf: The Apocalypse – Earthblood
- Worms: Collection
- Worms: The Revolution Collection
