= Giving Up (disambiguation) =

"Giving Up" is a 1964 song by Gladys Knight & the Pips.

Giving Up may also refer to:

- "Giving Up", a song from the album Two Hearts by Men at Work
- "Giving Up", a song from the album When Broken Is Easily Fixed by Silverstein

== See also ==
- Givin' It Up, a recording/collaboration between Al Jarreau and George Benson
- Give Up (disambiguation)
- Give It Up (disambiguation)
- Give It All Up (disambiguation)
