= Street Legal =

Street Legal may refer to:

- Street-Legal (album), a 1978 album by Bob Dylan
- Street Legal (Canadian TV series), a Canadian television series which aired from 1987 to 1994 and in 2019
- Street Legal (New Zealand TV series), a New Zealand television series which aired from 2000 to 2005
- Street Legal (video game), a racing game developed by Invictus and published by Activision

== See also ==
- Street-legal vehicle, a vehicle legal for use on public roads
