= Insane 2 =

2011 video game

- Jewel case cover art
- Developer: Targem Games
- Publishers: RU: Game Factory Interactive; DE: Peter Games; JP: Overland
- Producer: Ivan Bunakov
- Designer: Nikolai Seleznev
- Platform: Windows
- Release: September 30, 2011: Retail; RU: September 30, 2011; DE: May 25, 2012 Digital; WW: October 06, 2011; JP: August 29, 2012
- Genre: Racing
- Modes: Single-player, multiplayer

Insane 2 (stylized as In2ane) is an off-road racing game developed by Targem Games. It is the sequel to the 2000 game Insane by Invictus Games, and was released for Windows in 2011. Players control one of an assortment of motor vehicles and drive across terrain in locations on most continents of the world, participating in off-road races or completing objectives in one of nine other game modes, such as Capture the Flag.

Development of the game started in 2009, when Codemasters, who owned the Insane trademark, licensed it to Targem Games. Invictus had no known input in the Targem team's creative process, and the latter relied on the details of the original Insane and the reviews published near that game's release. Notably, the team altered the game mechanics to speed up the pace of the gameplay at the expense of physical realism.

The multiplayer mode was often praised, but many critics pointed out the absence of online servers near launch. The variety of game modes was also praised, although some individual modes received criticism. Reviewers were divided on the artificial intelligence-controlled drivers, level design, and graphics, but tended to be more unfavorable toward the sound and musical score. In Hungary, where the series originated, reviewer reception was lukewarm, instead favoring the game's predecessor.

== Gameplay ==
Like the original Insane, Insane 2 is a racing game where players drive on terrain, vying to be the first to complete objectives. The races are set in fictional locations on four continents of Eurasia, North America, Africa, and Antarctica, and the maps permit a considerable amount of open world exploration and are wrapped around so that vehicles exiting one side of the map reappear on the opposite. Up to eight players each drive in one of 18 four-wheeled motor vehicles divided into six classes: 4×4s, SUVs, pickups, trucks, monster trucks, and prototypes. The vehicles' models are based on real-life automotive brands, such as buggies and Bigfoot trucks, but otherwise do not carry trademarked names or symbols.

In this screenshot, the player and all five other players are shown chasing the spotlight of the helicopter in Pursuit mode, one of the new game modes introduced to the series. At the top of the interface and clockwise are a compass pointing to the player's objectives, the race's goal, player positions, a minimap, and a gauge for the boost ability, also new to the series.

There are ten game variations, most of which return from the original Insane. Besides traditional off-road racing, they are Capture the Flag, Gate Hunt, Jamboree, Pathfinder, and Return the Flag. The remaining four are new to the series: Greed, Pursuit, Knockout, and Zone Patrol. In Capture the Flag, players score points by carrying a flag by picking it up from the ground or stealing it from the player carrying it, scoring extra points by carrying it to the active checkpoint. In Gate Hunt, players attempt to drive through as many gates as possible before their opponents. Jamboree is another gate-based mode where one gate is active until a player crosses it, awarding them a point and activating another at random. A few gates are lit in yellow to indicate which one will activate next. In Pathfinder, players seek to become the first to cross all gates. Return the Flag has a flag placed at random points of the map, and players attempt to return it to the base before others do.

As for the new game modes, in Greed, gold, silver, and bronze packages are dropped by parachute, and points are awarded to whoever collects them, with gold being worth the most and bronze the least. Pursuit involves a helicopter traveling above the playing field and beaming down a cone of light in which players strive to remain the longest. Knockout is an elimination race game where the player in last place drops out after an amount of time, usually 15 to 30 seconds, and the process repeats until only one player is left. In Zone Patrol, like Gate Hunt, players claim gates for points by driving through them. However, the claimed gates, which are marked by color, can be driven through by opponents, "recoloring" them and stealing those players' points.

Insane 2 is both a single-player and multiplayer game. In single-player, the player can opt for career mode or a quick race. The former spans 170 races grouped into four championships, which are further divided into events, each governing the rules and required class of vehicles. At the start of career mode, only two off-road races and a single car with a basic configuration are available, but more vehicles, races, and other game modes are unlocked by completing races. Progression occurs by placing in the top three, rewarding the player with points to be spent on upgrading aspects of a vehicle's performance, as well as paint jobs, and placing higher rewards more points. The player can use the rewards to purchase upgrades to their vehicle's body, engine, or suspension, each of which modifies the vehicle's five attributes of speed, acceleration, boost ability, off-roading, and durability, Vehicles have access to a limited boost ability, which can be used to increase their speed and automatically recharges after being used. However, in modes with flags, carrying the flag disables the ability. Damage to vehicles results in parts of the chassis falling off, but has no effect on their performance, except when it causes one of their wheels to separate. Obstacles include road trains, rail road transport, rhinoceroses, and stray lightning bolts that threaten to strike the player's vehicle. Should a player's vehicle suffer serious damage, it can be repaired on the press of a button or, in the case of a total wreck, automatically after a few seconds. In Quick Race mode, the player sets the location and rules and enters a race with those settings.

In multiplayer, a second player can join the first in split-screen, provided they have an Xbox 360 controller. In addition, one can connect to a server online with up to seven other human players or set up their own, where settings such as map, mode, class of vehicles allowed, and number of AI-controlled bots are defined by the host.

== Development and release ==
The first Insane game was created by Invictus Games, a video game company based in Debrecen, Hungary. It was published for Windows by Codemasters on November 24, 2000, as the launch title for its online service, the Codemasters Multiplayer Network, coinciding with the European launch of the PlayStation 2. Invictus had indicated in an interview with Hungarian online magazine PC Dome the possibility of a sequel by stating that it would continue using the game's style for future racing games. By 2007, Invictus had laid out ideas for the second game, but Codemasters, who owned the license to the Insane trademark, decided not to request the project yet.

Insane 2 was first announced in February 2009, when Codemasters licensed the Insane trademark to Russian developer Targem Games to develop the sequel, as Invictus had shifted its focus toward online racing games at the time. Codemasters also granted Game Factory Interactive the rights to publish the upcoming title in Russia, with Codemasters to distribute the game in the Western world. After extensive analyses, surveys, and conservations with players, Targem saw it best that their game be characterized by a friendly driving model, graphics, and multiplayer. The game's designer, Nikolai Seleznev, told Igromania that dynamics, or pace, was factored in Targem's development. To increase the pace of the gameplay, the company decided to add the boost ability and changed the damage system so that parts would fly off, but made wheel loss the only damage that would affect vehicle performance. He also revealed that the levels were designed in a way that shorter routes would contain more obstacles. The developers strove for a balance between speed and realistic vehicular physics. As Seleznev could not contact Invictus Games for creative input, his team instead examined the original game in detail and read contemporaneous reviews. An in-house proprietary game engine was chosen for the convenience of the development environment, and tracks were bought from youth musical groups. The original announcement stated that the game was to be released in 2010, but it was moved to a year later since that year the team was coordinating the vehicles' appearance and doing further work on multiplayer mode. Car tuning was also simplified to an upgrade system, and according to the game's project producer, Ivan Bunakov, only one game mode, Destruction Zone, was left out due to balancing issues.

A playable demo first surfaced on Russobit-M's website on May 30, 2011. Insane 2 was first published in retail in Russia on September 30, being soon distributed digitally worldwide through GamersGate on October 6. It was subsequently released on the digital platform Steam on January 24, 2012. In Germany, it was published in retail by Peter Games on May 25. It was also distributed digitally in Japan by Overland on August 29.

== Reception ==
Reception

Review scores
Publication	Score
4Players	70%
Eurogamer	7/10
GameStar	71%
PC Games (DE)	74%
The Games Machine (Italy)	82%
Game Channel	5/10
GameStar (Hungary)	69%
gram.pl	6.5/10
Igromania	6/10
Level (Romania)	8.5/10
PC Dome	65%
PC Guru	60%

The Czech division of Eurogamer generally praised the driver artificial intelligence, and was impressed with the level of graphics it deemed sufficient even when using required hardware, which the website noted was low. However, it felt that the vehicles were lightweight and the sound effects and music unimpressive, and criticized the lack of a speedometer or rear-view mirror in the user interface and the presence of only two camera angles. Eurogamer concluded that the shift to an action-packed and arcade-like formula might repel fans of the original Insane, recommending that it be purchased only at a discount. GameStar lauded the risk-versus-reward aspect of the maps' open nature, the split-screen multiplayer mode, and also the AI, but considered the driving to be unchallenging and the maps to be missing landmarks or sights.

In a positive review, the Romanian edition of Level praised the vast expanses of wrapped land and varied selection of vehicles, graphics and soundtrack, game modes such as Capture The Flag, and local and online multiplayer. However, it also criticized the AI and the absence of local area network support, considered the user interface unpolished and the music potentially repetitive, and also noted a dearth of servers at the time of the review, but the magazine concluded that the game "remains at least as fun as its venerable predecessor and brings crazy, fun racing back to PC that is hard to put down." Another positive review by the Italian magazine The Games Machine praised the level design and variety of game modes, despite missing one called "freeride".

Igromania found the game easy to learn, but otherwise thought that the game lacked originality and should have run on Codemasters' own Ego engine. 4Players praised the Pursuit game mode, described the scenery as "idyllic", and noted fast menus and short loading times, but grew bored of single-player mode after about 20 rounds and was not immersed into the game by the handling. PC Games believed that the game was too simple to attract many fans of racing, but found it enjoyable on occasion, complimenting the handling as balanced, the AI, and the two flag modes. gram.pl summarized the production of Insane 2 as "uneven", characterizing the game modes as varied but repetitive and lacking randomness, the locations as large but with scarce elements in between areas, the car tuning as modest, and career mode as lengthy but too easy. The website also criticized the audiovisual department overall as substandard, but praised the weather effects.

Hungarian sources expressed their preference for the first Insane game. While praising the size and visibility of the locations and lighting, PC Guru criticized the flat courses and the damage modeling of the vehicles, though not the vehicular models themselves, observed bugs in driver AI performance, noted only slight improvements in vehicles with upgrades purchased, and concluded, "Unfortunately, Insane 2 became an uninteresting sequel that terribly lacks the physical modeling and AI system put together by Invictus, which turned the [original] game into such lovable entertainment." The Hungarian edition of GameStar also praised the vehicles, along with the graphics, which it described as "really average, but in a rather positive way," but found that, after three races, the game gradually turned boring and annoying, reporting many instances of the AI-controlled players quickly appearing in areas in physically impossible ways and that the AI in Pursuit mode had unfair knowledge of the path of the helicopter's spotlight in the first lap. PC Dome praised the music and diversity of terrain, but thought the sound department was weak, in part due to the lack of a commentator (who was given a voice for the Hungarian localization of the original game), criticized the lack of a track generator, and chided the vehicular physics as an unwelcome change from the relative realism of the original game, comparing it to that of Burnout Paradise. Game Channel, which disliked the idea of a non-Hungarian studio taking up development of a sequel to a native game, conversely disparaged the music as "peasant disco", and also likened the visuals to Need for Speed titles from around 2005. The publication found the speed of cars to be middling even with the use of boost and the physics and map topography at odds with the arcade style of the game, but it did praise the Pursuit mode and the progression system.
