= Project Torque =

2008 video game

- Logo
- Developer: Invictus Games
- Publishers: Aeria Games & Entertainment (2007-2010); Jogara Ltd. (October 2019-present)
- Platform: Microsoft Windows
- Release: WW: April 30, 2008; WW: December 20, 2019 (re-release)
- Genre: Racing MMO
- Mode: Multiplayer

Project Torque, also known as Level-R outside North America and HEAT Online for the 2010 North American version, is a multiplayer online racing game (MMORG) with partially chargeable content, or micro-transactions, originally developed by Invictus Games. It features gameplay elements such as tuning and customization.

Level-R was originally developed for the Japanese market in 2006 and was based on Cross Racing Championship Extreme 2005. The Level-R versions across the world (localized versions were released for Russia, Indonesia, Thailand, and China, in addition to Europe and North America) were mostly similar to each other, with minor physics and content tweaks. The Level-R versions combined with the original Project Torque version had 64 cars in total, although none of the versions have all 64 cars due to licensing issues. The 2019 version, however, has no licensed cars, nor does it have cars from post-2010 builds, such as the Corus R4 or certain Thunder Alley cars.

As of July 31, 2010, the Project Torque service, hosted by Aeria Games Entertainment, is no longer in service. Invictus Games Ltd. signed a deal with Innologin Ltd. to publish a new North American service of Level-R, called HEAT Online. HEAT Online's online service operated until May 2014.

In August 2019, fans of Level-R and Project Torque started a crowdfunding campaign for $10,000 to get the game back online. The funds were supposed to cover contract and legal fees for gaining the publishing rights to Project Torque from Invictus Games. The campaign goal was reached and in late August 2019 Jogara Ltd., a fan-run company, signed the publishing contract, with the game being re-released on Steam in December 2019.

== Game modes ==
Screenshot of the Thunder Alley Pro cars during the initial pace lap

Project Torque features various cars, some of them being licensed version of actual production cars (not available in 2019 re-release) while others are imitations. It features a variety of game modes such as Simulation, Arcade, and Thunder Alley. CTF and Drift modes were removed from the original game after the release of Julia build on June 3, 2010, but were reinstated in the 2019 re-release.

=== Simulation ===
Simulation is a mode designed to portray the realism of racing. With recent updates, the mode has become a mix of arcade and simulation mechanics. Differences from arcade mode is less forgiving steering, cosmetic and mechanical damage, and bonus points rewarded for racing in simulation mode. This mode features up to 2–8 players and a variety of tracks that can be raced on several lap segments (1/3/5/7/10/15/20).

=== Arcade ===
Arcade is a mode similar to most other racing video games. Unlike simulation mode, it has an easier steering system, an optional "no collision" system (called ghost mode), and less mechanical damage. This mode features up to 2–8 players and a variety of tracks that can be raced on several lap segments (1/3/5/7/10/15/20). Newer players to the game will only be able to race in arcade mode until they unlock access to simulation mode tracks.

=== Thunder Alley ===
Thunder Alley is very similar to NASCAR. It is one of the most popular modes of Project Torque and includes three classes of cars: Rookie, Pro, and Intimidator. The Rookie class is similar to the NASCAR Whelen Modified Tour series, the Pro class to the Car of Tomorrow (wing model) used by the NASCAR Cup Series at the time, and the Intimidator class to the Generation 4 cars at the time used by the then-NASCAR Nationwide Series. With ongoing updates, a few other cars were added later to expand the number of available cars in this mode.

Thunder Alley mode provides a wind tunnel mechanic and a fuel consumption mechanic that the other racing modes lack. Currently there are five tracks for this mode: Sunbay Speedway (resembling Talladega), Livenport Raceway (resembling Bristol), Jankwill Raceway, Nurgenhoch and Red Rock Speedway. The mode features the ability to race up to 20 players, and to run up to 60 laps a race. Unlike the NASCAR series where they have caution flags, Thunder Alley has a penalty system that forces a driver to do a pass through the pit lane when the driver breaks too many violations. This system, however, has been criticized for the inaccuracy of the penalties as it would penalize a victim of another driver's faults.

=== Drag ===
Drag is a mode where 2–4 players line up in a quarter or a half mile strip to smoke some rubber and see who is the fastest racer. You have to shift manually in Drag mode, as it requires shifting at the right RPM to gain a faster run. Drag mode also features a different engine damage system, compared to other modes, which makes the engine blow up from improper shifting. A drag race session can involve multiple heat runs, and the player with the best set of heats wins.

=== Capture the Flag ===
Capture the Flag is an arena "cat and mouse" type mode played with 2–8 players. One player grabs the flag and runs through checkpoints, while other players try to grab the flag away by running into the flag carrier. The flag holder can also lose the flag by repairing, recovering, or rolling their car over. The player who scores the most points wins. Players gain points by holding the flag for long periods, running through checkpoints with the flag, stealing the flag or chasing the flag holder.

=== Explorer ===
Explorer is a "freeroam" type mode with 2-8 players. The goal is to pick up the most tokens as possible that are placed around the entire map. The tokens have different colours and designs, while most of them have just a simple colour, a few also grant the player an enhancement for his (better grip, more power) or have a direct positive influence in the gameplay to help the player for a short period of time (magnet to collect tokens easier, radar to guide to the nearest token etc.). A very special variant of the tokens is the question mark. It can not only contain the positive effects you can find on the street, but also might surprise the player with a trap that disturbs the player for a short period of time (reversed steering, flipped screenview, slippery tires etc.). If the player is lucky enough, it also might reward him with special items that normally only can be bought in the shop, reaching from simple flame skid marks to cars and other special items.

=== Drift ===
Drifting is a 2–8 player mode that uses the same tracks as simulation and arcade modes and also comes in addition with an currently for this mode exclusive track. Lap times and position do not matter, rather the winner of a drift round is determined by how many drift points the players can score. Drift points are determined by angle (of the car in the curve), speed, length of the drift, and the drift multiplier. A unique feature of the drift mode is the ability to use specialized drifting cars, one of which resembles the Falken Mustang driven by Vaughn Gittin.

=== Challenge ===
Challenge is a 4-8 player mode that uses the physics and a small number of tracks of simulation. The difference is, that the optional "no collision" system ( called ghost mode) is always enabled and the players start at the same position instead of distributed on a grid.

The most important difference is that the first and second place gets rewarded not only with the ingame currency (RP) and experience (XP) but also rewards with GP (Ingame currency that normally only can be bought with real money).

Having GPs as reward, makes the entry in this mode quite special. Not only are at least four players needed to start the race, but in order to join this lobby the player has to get a "Racing Challenger Ticket" first. This ticket can only be bought with GP or found with much luck in the explorer mode when picking up a question mark token.

== Invictus controversy ==
In October 2009, Invictus (the developer of the game) issued an IP ban of all non-US accounts on Project Torque. The reason is to be believed that the European publisher of Level-R, gamigo AG, filed a complaint concerning a breach in contract because European players were playing Project Torque which is claimed to be a North America-only version. Aeria Games & Entertainment (AGE) had to comply with the IP ban, and as a result the player base of Project Torque dramatically decreased. Fellow users of Project Torque gathered together in an attempt to dodge the IP bans in forms of proxies and VPN clients, but the tools used to dodge the IP Bans became blocked as well.

Following the bans, Invictus stated that they would no longer support the Project Torque version of their game which was very different from the Level-R version. This means that Project Torque would not receive anymore special builds from Invictus. On May 24, 2010, AGE had announced that a new build, Julia, was coming to Project Torque. CTF and Drift modes would be removed from the game, there would be a GUI refresh, and a few new modes added. However, the patch did not promise a lift of the IP ban of non-US IPs. On the morning of June 3, 2010, the Julia build was released as a current, but "open beta," version of the game. There was much criticism from the build as it was similar to the Level-R version, and the patch removed all the unique features that had made Project Torque popular.

== Reception ==
The game's critical reception was average. Some users have complained about the change in the steering mechanics from some builds, and the inability to sell cars.

MMO Huts gave Project Torque a "Good" rating saying, "Project Torque is a really polished and fun racing MMO." They also noted the beautiful graphics compared to other MMO games, and the solid gameplay. Users gave it a 3.99/5 rating.

MMORPG Center rated Project Torque an 8.0/10. "Overall Project Feature is a great online racing game, played in small sessions or sometimes you will want more and more." Users on MMORPG Center gave Project Torque a 9.3/10.

Swift World rated Project Torque a 7/10 for great gameplay, but mentioned the lack of players during the time. Users of Swift World rated Project Torque a 9.7/10.

Kei Beneza of OnRPG said, "If I were to judge this game, I would say that the game is a lot better than most of the racing games out there." He noted that the game had great graphics, was able to run on low-end PCs, and had a simple solution to connection-lag during races.

== End of service and revival ==
On July 8, 2010, Aeria Games announced that they could no longer support the running of Project Torque, and that the game would be completely shut down on August 2, 2010. Aeria also stated that they will hold a series of events, refund AP (Aeria cash currency) to players who had spent AP in the past 90 days, and even grant access to "hidden content" that had never been released before. The decision to shut down the servers took effect on July 31, 2010, with the forums (except for general discussion section) being closed the next day.

On July 29, 2010, Invictus announced a new publisher for Project Torque. The game would be called HEAT Online, and would be hosted by Innologin Ltd.

On February 15, 2014, Invictus Games Ltd. announced that they will discontinue service of HEAT Online; the decision took effect on May 1, 2014, The download and forums for the game were taken down few months later.

An attempt by Killz Gaming community to save the game with a Kickstarter crowdfunding campaign failed; by the time the deadline was reached on September 5, 2014, only a few backers supported the project.

On December 20, 2019, the game was re-released on Steam, following a second attempt at crowdfunding for revival of the game that succeeded. Jogara Ltd. is the listed publisher for the Steam version of the game.
