= Give Up (disambiguation) =

Give Up is a 2003 album by The Postal Service.

Give Up may also refer to:

- Give Up (EP), by Miles Kane, 2013
- "Give Up", a song by Diana Ross from Diana, 1980
- "Give Up", a song by CSS from Donkey, 2008
- "Give Up?", a song by Hot Hot Heat from Happiness Ltd., 2007

== See also ==
- "Given Up", a song by Linkin Park
- Give It Up (disambiguation)
- Give It All Up (disambiguation)
- Giving Up (disambiguation)
