= OnEscapee =

1997 video game

onEscapee
- Developer: Invictus Games
- Publishers: Sadeness Software; IntuitiveComputers (Switch Only)
- Platforms: Amiga, Windows, Nintendo Switch
- Release: 1997: Amiga; 2004: Windows; 2024: Nintendo Switch (as The Escapee)
- Genre: Action-adventure
- Mode: Single-player

OnEscapee (pronounced "One Escapee", to reflect the nature of the protagonist) is an action-adventure video game, released for the Amiga in 1997. Invictus re-released the software in 2004 as freeware for Microsoft Windows to coincide with the 10th anniversary of the company's founding. In 2024, OnEscapee was released on Nintendo Switch as The Escapee.

== History ==
onEscapee was developed by Invictus Games and published by the UK-Based Sadeness Software. It was distributed in a CD format, which was unusual for the period since the Amiga 1200 was not fitted with a CD drive. Therefore, the users were required to purchase an additional external CD-ROM drive (or re-house the computer to fit an internal drive) in order to run software from discs. Since Invictus is a Hungarian team, to make the game as international as possible, text and speech was kept to a minimum. As a result, the game has support for over 17 languages. The only language featured in the game is in the music used in the titles and in one scene of the game, the menus, help text and the opening FMV sequence.

== Gameplay ==
onEscapee's gameplay is very similar to Another World and Flashback: The Quest for Identity in gameplay and use similar rotoscoped, hand-drawn graphics.

== Plot ==
Daniel White is reminiscing in a monologue humanity's first encounter with "the first aliens", talking of how they ushered in "new civilizations". He goes on to mention how "healthy, strong men" suddenly began to disappear around the same time. There is a cut to a new video sequence featuring the metropolis where humanity presumably presides. Despite the cities being adequately lit and having the appearance of life, very few other humans feature in the game, with the vast majority of life being either animal or robotic.

onEscapee screenshot from the Amiga version. The player, is depicted in battle stance. The character's health meter is located at the top-left.

It is unclear where the game is set. Furthermore, there does not appear to be any human influence on the land, with the majority of animal and even plant life taking alien forms. Either this is demonstrating the intrusiveness of the alien culture, or White has landed on the aliens' planet, and it is his destiny to become an "escapee" and return to Earth. If this is the case, a similar plot can be found in Flashback: The Quest for Identity.

The player sees an unlabeled automotive flying from the city into a more aerial location, with mountains visible in the background. It appears that the two drivers in the front have captured a male (White) who is in the back. As they drive, however, White wakes up and begins to struggle, causing the driver to lose control and crash. The player's sight is then diverted to a console view of a garbage disposal droid, which lists all three occupants of the automotive as dead and sends a unit to clear the wreckage.

After navigating his way through a series of caves and procuring a firearm, a gun similar to that of Another World which allows the player both to fire and activate a temporary shield, White moves into a forest area populated with what appears to be alien wildlife. From there, he makes his way through to an alien base.

White fights his way through the base, coming into first contact with the aliens' arsenal of robotic guards. Using his gun and the smattering of health regenerators, White eventually fights a boss who takes the form of himself. After defeating him, however, the shape-shifter assumes a much more threatening Grim Reaper-style form with wings and a cane. This character, who goes unnamed throughout the game, will chase White at intervals, and will vapourise him upon contact.

After taking an elevator, White finds himself in the metropolis itself. He must find a variety of strategically placed levers to unlock a door leading to what appears to be a landing strip. Along the way he fights robots and avoids guard-dogs and people piloting what appear to be flying motorcycles, as well as mobile gun turrets and aliens with grenades. Upon unlocking the exit, the boss from the previous level begins chase and, blinded by his panic, White dives off the end of the landing strip onto the rocks, where he loses consciousness.

The following morning White regains consciousness and must dive into a stream, falling down a waterfall before he can progress any further. After locating an upgrade to his gun in a water maze, he finds a passage leading to a warehouse. Inside he remarks upon the boss, cane in-hand, watching from a distance as other humans co-operate on construction of some form of aircraft.

White scales the vast warehouse, destroying a machine that lies in his way and littering the floor in components. After finding the other humans occupying the warehouse, he surrenders the equipment and the humans accept him as an ally. After implanting him with a thermometer to measure his vital signs, they board the craft. Upon the course of distracting the boss, White dives underwater, which causes the thermometer to display a reading akin to death. The crew, thus, release a rocket aimed at their origin intended to kill the boss.

His job done, White emerges from the water, his thermometer returning to normal levels. At this point the crew realise their terrible mistake, and White is killed in the blast that also destroys the boss, guaranteeing the safety of the other three human escapees, although sealing his own fate on the planet he had tried to vacate.
