= Extinction (video game) =

2018 video game

- Developer: Iron Galaxy
- Publisher: Modus Games
- Director: Kraig Kujawa
- Platforms: PlayStation 4, Windows, Xbox One
- Release: April 10, 2018
- Genre: Action

Extinction is an action game developed by Iron Galaxy and published by Modus Games. The game was released for PlayStation 4, Windows, and Xbox One in 2018. It received mixed reviews.

== Gameplay ==
Extinction is an action game. It features similar gameplay to Shadow of the Colossus. It is also partly inspired by the anime series Attack on Titan.

== Development and release ==
Extinction was developed by Iron Galaxy and published by Maximum Games. The game was announced in June 2017 and shown off behind closed doors to members of the press at E3 2017. Extinction was released for PlayStation 4, Windows, and Xbox One on April 10, 2018.

== Reception ==
Reception

Aggregate score
| Aggregator | Score |
|---|---|
| Metacritic | 51/100 (PC); 47/100 (PS4); 52/100 (XBO) |

Review scores
| Publication | Score |
|---|---|
| Destructoid | 6/10 |
| Game Informer | 5.5/10 |
| GameSpot | 4/10 |
| IGN | 6.6/10 |
| PC Gamer (US) | 58/100 |
| Push Square | 6/10 |

Extinction received "mixed or average" reviews from professional critic according to review aggregator Metacritic.

The game won the award for "Original Score" at the 9th Hollywood Music in Media Awards.
