= Teslagrad =

2013 video game

- Developer: Rain Games
- Publishers: Original; Rain Games; Remastered; Modus Games
- Designer: Magnus Holm
- Programmer: Fredrik Ludvigsen
- Artist: Ole Ivar Rudi
- Writer: Marte Haugsbø
- Engine: Unity
- Platforms: Microsoft Windows, OS X, Linux, Wii U, PlayStation 3, PlayStation 4, PlayStation Vita, Xbox One, Nintendo Switch, Android, iOS, PlayStation 5, Xbox Series X/S
- Release: Microsoft Windows, OS X, Linux: WW: 13 December 2013; Wii U: WW: 11 September 2014; PlayStation 3, PlayStation 4: PAL: 3 December 2014; NA: 14 April 2015; PlayStation Vita: NA: 24 November 2015; PAL: 27 November 2015; Xbox One: WW: 9 March 2016; Nintendo Switch: WW: 7 December 2017; Android, iOS: WW: 8 November 2018; PlayStation 5, Xbox Series X/S: WW: 19 June 2023
- Genre: Puzzle-platform
- Mode: Single-player

Teslagrad is a 2013 side-scrolling puzzle-platform game developed and published by Rain Games.

The game revolves around magnetism and electromagenic powers to solve puzzles while uncovering a conspiracy involving a despotic king. It received generally positive reviews.

A sequel, Teslagrad 2, was released in 2023.

== Gameplay ==
In-game screenshot showing the colorful hand-drawn art style

Teslagrad is a 2.5D puzzle-platformer with action elements, where magnetism and other electromagnetic powers are the key to go throughout the game, and thereby discover the secrets kept in the long abandoned Tesla Tower. The game features minimal combat segments coupled with electric-based puzzle sections and precise platforming. Teslagrad is set in a steampunk-inspired version of old Europe, in a non-linear world with more than a hundred hand-drawn environments.

The player controls a young boy, who suddenly finds himself embroiled in a long-forgotten conspiracy involving the despotic king who has ruled the nation with an iron fist for several years. The game offers various upgrades and items as the game progresses.

== Plot ==
In the Kingdom of Elektropia, a king rules with an iron fist, combating and destroying a sect of technological wizards who have a massive tower in the middle of the city named Teslagrad. The name Teslagrad is built from a name and a word, the inventor Tesla and the Slavic word Grad for City. One day, a young orphaned boy finds himself hounded by the King's guards, fleeing into the deserted tower and uncovering the history of the conflict.

== Production ==
Teslagrad was originally conceived as the world of Chroma evolved, derived from a casual-focused multiplayer game called Minute Mayhem. Rain Games stopped the development of the first game that the team was working on in order to focus on Teslagrad. Wii U, PlayStation 3, and PlayStation 4 versions of the game were announced in June 2013, July 2013, and August 2014, respectively.

The game saw the launch of its first playable demo for the PC which was released in August 2013. Later that year, developers Rain Game showcased Teslagrad at various indie game events such as PAX Prime 2013 and Eurogamer Expo 2013, gathering invaluable feedback and being warmly received by players and press. The game uses the Unity game engine, making it easier for developers to reach cross platforms.

== Release ==
The game was released on Steam on 13 December 2013, on Nintendo eShop for the Wii U on 11 September 2014, and on PlayStation Store for the PlayStation 3 and PlayStation 4 on 3 December 2014 in Europe. The North American PSN Store release date for the PlayStation 3 and PlayStation 4 was scheduled on 27 January 2015, but was postponed on the day of the release. The retail version, published by Soedesco, was released in France, Germany, Italy, and Spain on 3 December 2014, and in UK on 30 January 2015. The PlayStation Vita version was announced on 27 February 2014, but since then no exact date was given. The game was also released digitally in Japan on 18 February 2015, with an update to the Steam version that added Japanese language. An Xbox One version was announced at the end of February 2016 with the release date of 9 March 2016.

A version for Android and iOS has been released on 8 November 2018.

== Sequel ==
A sequel, Teslagrad 2, was announced in September 2020. In addition to a remastered version of the 2013 original game, the sequel was released in April 2023 for Microsoft Windows, Nintendo Switch, PlayStation 4, PlayStation 5, Xbox One and Xbox Series X/S.

== Reception ==
Reception

Aggregate score
Aggregator	Score
Metacritic	PC: 77/100; WIIU: 79/100; PS4: 78/100; VITA: 74/100; XONE: 76/100; NS: 81/100

Review scores
Publication	Score
Nintendo Life	9/10
Nintendo World Report	8/10

Teslagrad received generally positive reviews. Review aggregator website Metacritic gave the Wii U version 79/100 based on 15 reviews, the Microsoft Windows version 77/100 based on 15 reviews, and the PlayStation 4 version 78/100 based on 14 reviews.

Nintendo Life praised the game for its nostalgic music, hand drawn artwork and brain bending puzzles. Nintendo World Report also praised the game for its art style, though they criticized the game for its steep difficulty and minimal Wii U GamePad usage.

IGN reported in March 2016 that 1.6 million copies of the game had been sold.
