= Deer Drive Legends =

2012 video game

- Developer: Raylight s.r.l.
- Publisher: Maximum Games
- Platforms: Nintendo 3DS, Microsoft Windows, Wii, WiiWare, Nintendo Switch
- Release: Nintendo 3DS: NA: May 27, 2012; EU: August 13, 2013 (eShop only); Wii: NA: November 16, 2012; Microsoft Windows: NA: November 16, 2012 (Retail); WW: January 7, 2013 (Digital); WiiWare: NA: November 19, 2013; EU: November 28, 2013; Nintendo Switch: WW: June 14, 2019
- Genre: Sports (Hunting)
- Modes: Single-player, Multiplayer

Deer Drive Legends is a three-dimensional hunting video game, developed by Raylight s.r.l. This 3D hunting game was published by Maximum Games and released on the Nintendo 3DS in May 2012 for both retail and download via Nintendo eShop. It was later ported as a Wii and retail Windows PC game, and released in November 2012. The PC version was re-titled as Deer Hunt Legends. Unexpectedly, the Wii version of the game was eventually re-released as a WiiWare title on November 19, 2013, the first WiiWare title ever since Retro City Rampage launched on the platform in February 2013. A Nintendo Switch version was released on June 14, 2019.

The PC version became available in Europe via digital distribution when it was released globally on Steam in January 2013. The Nintendo 3DS and WiiWare versions of the game were released in Europe in August and November 2013 respectively, wherein the Nintendo 3DS version is exclusively an eShop downloadable with a reduced price.

Deer Drive Legends is rated T for Teens by the ESRB. Deer Drive Legends has little relation to the 2007 Deer Drive and 2009 Deer Drive games, other than having similar titles and deer hunting concepts.

== Setting ==
Deer Drive Legends takes place in numerous locations throughout the world, including the African Savannah, Rocky Mountains, Russia and Great Lakes. Players will explore famed hunting regions across three continents in search of the biggest trophy.

=== Animals ===
Players will take down a number of elusive animals such as bears, antelope, elk, deer, wolves, and mountain lions. The game also features prehistoric species as bosses such as the Smilodon, T. rex, aurochs and Gastornis.
