= Insane (2000 video game) =

2000 video game

- European cover
- Developer: Invictus Games, Ltd.
- Publisher: Codemasters
- Series: Insane
- Platform: Microsoft Windows
- Release: EU: 24 November 2000; NA: 9 February 2001
- Genre: Racing
- Modes: Single-player, multiplayer

Insane (stylized as 1NSANE) is an off-road racing game by Invictus and distributed by Codemasters. While in development, it had been provisionally titled Off The Road. It is the spiritual successor to the tech-demo Terep 2 by lead programmer Dénes Nagymáthé.

A sequel, Insane 2, was released on 24 January 2012.

== Gameplay ==
Levels are set in real world locations, scattered throughout North America, Europe, Africa, Asia and Australia. The actual design, however, is fictitious. The single-player campaign comprises a series of championships in different vehicle classes, where the player unlocks new vehicles and locations, based on their score. Vehicles range from utility vehicles to light buggies and are either fictional or inspired by actual production vehicles. Though the names do not correspond with any actual vehicle, the fact is evident both visually in-game and in the names of the game's files.

Players can drive cars of their choices in either of nine events, which include Capture the Flag, Jamboree, Gate Hunt, Destruction Zone, Pathfinder, Off-Road Racing, Return the Flag, and Free Roam, which, exclusively, is available in practice mode.

== Reception ==
Reception

Aggregate score
Aggregator	Score
Metacritic	69/100

Review scores
Publication	Score
Computer Games Strategy Plus	4/5
Computer Gaming World	4/5
Edge	6/10
Eurogamer	5/10
Game Informer	7.25/10
GamePro	3/5
GameSpot	7.6/10
GameSpy	83%
GameZone	8/10
IGN	7.1/10
Next Generation	3/5
PC Gamer (US)	76%

Insane received "average" reviews according to the review aggregation website Metacritic. Samuel Bass of NextGen said, "A fun, flawed game, 1nsane doesn't quite live up to the expectations raised by its ambitious design." Computer Games Strategy Plus gave it a favorable review, a few weeks before its U.S. release date.

=== Awards ===
Award	Result
"Best Off-Road Game Ever – PC Gamer"	Won
"Best Debut of the Year in 2001 – Game.EXE"	Won
"Game of the Year in 2001 – PC Guru"	Won
