= Teslagrad 2 =

- Developer: Rain Games
- Publisher: Modus Games
- Platforms: Windows; PlayStation 4; PlayStation 5; Nintendo Switch; Xbox One; Xbox Series X/S
- Release: WW: April 19, 2023
- Genre: Action-adventure
- Mode: Single-player

Teslagrad 2 is an action-adventure video game video game developed by Rain Games and published in 2023 by Modus Games. It includes elements of Metroidvania games but has linear gameplay. Players control a girl with electromagnetism powers who attempts to return home. It is the sequel to Teslagrad.

== Gameplay ==
Players control Lumina, a girl who becomes stranded in a Scandinavian-alike land and seeks to return home. It is a side-scrolling 2D platform game with elements of Metroidvania games. Lumina obtains electromagnetic powers through power-ups, including the ability to teleport. Players solve puzzles to progress and engage in boss fights.

== Development ==
Rain Games waited several years to start Teslagrad 2 because they had spent so much time and effort on the original. The studio is based in Norway, and Teslagrad had featured some Scandinavian influences. In the sequel, they decided to amplify these influences and consider what a Viking Age world might look like had it persisted without European cultural assimilation. It took three years to complete the project. Modus Games released it for Windows, PlayStation 4 and 5, Xbox One and Series X/S, and Switch on April 19, 2023.

== Reception ==
On Metacritic, the Windows, PlayStation 5, and Switch version received mixed reviews, and the Xbox Series X/S version received positive reviews. In an early preview posted in January 2023, IGN said it was "shaping up to be a good puzzle-adventure" game. However, they said its limited combat mechanics made Teslagrad 2 controversial to identify as a Metroidvania game and suggested dropping them entirely to focus on puzzles. Nintendo Life called it "undeniably a great follow-up", though they felt it was a bit too short. Hardcore Gamer instead said it is "a solid, though flawed, follow-up" and said the gameplay "isn't as bold and surprising a second time round". Sports Illustrated praised the art but said the gameplay can be opaque to newcomers, and they felt the boss fights were not fun. Touch Arcade called the Switch version "an okay port of a pretty good game" and recommended playing it on other systems due to performance issues.
