= Override: Mech City Brawl =

Fighting video game

- North American PlayStation 4 cover art for the Super Charged Mega Edition
- Developer: The Balance Inc
- Publisher: Modus Games
- Composer: Eduardo Zolhof
- Engine: Unity
- Platforms: Microsoft Windows; Xbox One; PlayStation 4; Nintendo Switch
- Release: Microsoft Windows, Xbox One, PlayStation 4; 10 August 2018; Nintendo Switch; 15 October 2019
- Genre: Fighting
- Mode: Single-player

Override: Mech City Brawl is a mech-fighting video game developed by The Balance Inc and published by Modus Games. It was originally released for Xbox One, PlayStation 4 and Microsoft Windows in 2018. In 2019, the game was ported for Nintendo Switch. As of September 2022, all digital versions of the game has been delisted and are unavailable for purchase. Physical copies are still available.

== Gameplay ==
The gameplay is a more vibrant and fun take on mech editing which allows the player to unlock through gameplay. This includes such things as big glasses, hats, novelty clothing and different skin tone colours for each mech. The game allows the player to choose between the sixteen different mechs and each with a different fighting style. The game has several maps which are based on real world cities but are instead addressed by their respective countries.

In the single story mode, mysterious giant monsters have appeared and have begun attacking major cities, after a few months one of the Mech League Fighters steps in, in an attempt to save Japan, and after successfully fending off the monsters gets drafted into the UDF Rapid Response Team.

There are different multiplayer modes and offline matches that allows players to fight, team up or fight different mechs with up to four players at one time.

== Mechs ==
The sixteen different mech choices in the game include:

- Bellona
- Cocada
- Contessa
- Crystal
- Maestro
- Metageckon
- Mirai
- Mya
- Pescado
- Rocca
- Setesh
- Shifu
- Stardust
- Vidar
- Vintage
- Watchbot

== Reception ==
Upon its release, Override: Mech City Brawl was met with "mixed or average" reviews from critics, with aggregate scores of 59/100 for PlayStation 4, 69/100 for Microsoft Windows, 62/100 for Nintendo Switch, and 64/100 for Xbox One on Metacritic. The reviewers praised the game for its graphics, multiplayer modes and mechs. However, the combat was criticized for being too slow and that it relies on button mashing.

Robert Ramsey of Push Square said that the game "works well enough as a party-based brawler, but it's just too cumbersome and unbalanced to be anything more.", adding that the game "purposefully makes each playable mech feel weighty, with every punch and kick landing with a satisfyingly metal 'clunk'.".

== Sequel ==
A sequel to the game was released in December 2020, called Override 2: Super Mech League. It was also released on the new Xbox Series X and PlayStation 5.
