= Street Legal Racing: Redline =

2003 video game

- Developer: Invictus Games
- Publisher: Activision Value
- Series: Street Legal
- Engine: Custom-made JavaScript, Invictus SCX
- Platform: Microsoft Windows
- Release: July 18, 2003
- Genre: Racing
- Mode: Single-player

Street Legal Racing Redline is a racing game developed by Invictus and published by Activision Value. The game was released for Windows in July 2003.

The game was re-released by ImageCode LLC. on Steam in May 2016.

== Gameplay ==
The game takes place in Valo City (possibly a play on the word "velocity"), a metropolis known for its vast underworld of illegal street racing. The plot of the game is to beat every club and accomplish the requirements to enter the Race of Champions, a prestigious racing competition where one can win a bonus car. Players have to race others on the streets during the day for prestige (respect) or money to customize the car. During the night, players can either participate in a drag race against another driver or watch the race. The game also has the newly added race tracks that allow the player to race their own vehicles against AI's on a race track to win a prize.

A unique feature of the game is its detailed level of customization for the vehicles. The player can buy a completely new car from the dealership, a used one from a local shop where they were already customized or even totaled, or build the car from scratch with a chassis. Unlike a traditional street racing video game if the player crashes their car the consequences are real and must manually replace each part that got destroyed in the crash.

== Patches ==
Currently, there are three patches for the game: the 2.2.1 MWM (by Miran & Wichur), 2.3.0 Live Edition (by Raxat), and SLRR2015 (by Bigg Boss93, available on VStanced.com). The latest version (2.3.1) was released on Steam and is gradually improved by the Russian game developer ImageCode in collaboration with Raxat.

== Mods ==
Thousands of mods were made for this game, including vehicles, parts for said vehicles, tracks (some mods only work on the 2.2.1 MWM version), sounds, menu interfaces, and textures. Because some of the versions of the game are highly unstable, it is highly likely to crash when too many mods are installed mainly on the 2.2.1 and 2.3.0 versions.

== Reboot ==
The game was re-released on Steam on May 7, 2016. The Steam release was unstable when it first launched, but is gradually improving. Its textures and interface make it more contemporary, and the career is altered for more of a challenge.

== Possible sequel ==
Dave Singh, the owner of streetlegalmods.com, made a deal with Invictus Games, Ltd., stating that if the Kickstarter crowdfunding campaign reached a minimum of $150,000, the development of the sequel to SLRR, Street Tuning Evolution, would officially begin, as long as the game was playable and the community was allowed to add content. $500,000 was a goal to make a complete game.

After having a bad launch with the Kickstarter, and due to the popular demand of a PayPal option, Invictus Games, Ltd. and Dave Singh decided to move the campaign to Indiegogo to solve the many problems, and also to extend the deadline. Backers could then use PayPal to make a pledge. The campaign would have been funded only if it had reached $150,000. The IndieGogo campaign had a significantly better launch than the Kickstarter campaign, which raised around $24,000 a little more than 40 days after its launch in December 2014. The IndieGogo campaign raised nearly $10,000 just one day after its launch, but the campaign failed, reaching just over $30,000.

Despite the failure, another person, Bartosz "Wichur" Bieszka, plans to make a sequel to this game under the "Car Tune" title. ImageCode LLC. took over development for Street Tuning Evolution, which means the game is still very much alive, and will continue the progress from Invictus Games, Ltd.'s work.
