= Christina Seelye =

American entrepreneur

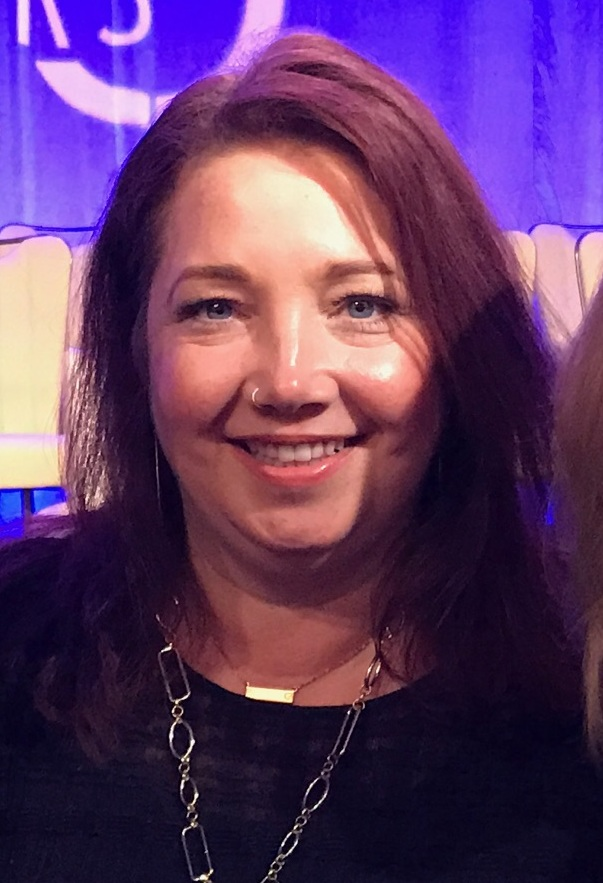
- Seelye in 2017
- Born: Richmond, California, U.S.
- Occupation(s): Entrepreneur and CEO
- Known for: Founding Maximum Games and Modus Games

Christina Seelye is an American entrepreneur. She is the CEO and founder of video game publisher Maximum Games, and its subsidiaries Modus Games and Modus Studios.

== Career ==
In June 2001, Christina founded Elibrium, a software publisher and developer of the MySoftware line of small business and personal productivity titles. As president and CEO, Christina led the company through industry changes, including electronic software distribution, subscription revenue models and direct consumer marketing. Elibrium was acquired by Avanquest Software in 2004. Following the acquisition, Christina served as the CEO and president of Avanquest Publishing USA until 2007.

In July 2004, Christina founded the Rhino Group, a software and technologies distribution and marketing platform.

In 2009, Christina co-founded Maximum Family Games, now Maximum Games, Inc., and in 2018 became the sole owner and founder after the departure of the former president Len Ciciretto.

In 2016, Christina led Maximum Games in acquiring UK based Avanquest Software Publishing Limited and rebranded the company as Maximum Games, Limited. The acquisition marked Maximum's move to expand distribution of its games globally, establishing a European sales and marketing position. During this time, they also established a second European subsidiary, Maximum Games Ireland Limited.

In 2018, Christina launched a new division of Maximum Games called Modus Games to provide AAA publishing services to independent developers globally. After several successful launches, Modus Games acquired its first development studio, expanding its capabilities to development with the addition of Modus Studios Brazil in 2019.

Christina currently serves on the board of directors for the Women Presidents’ Organization and as an officer on the board of directors for Women In Games International.

== Personal life ==
Christina was born in Richmond, California, U.S. Christina currently divides her time between managing Maximum Games in Walnut Creek and the subsidiaries in Europe and Latin America and attending the Owner/President Management Program at Harvard Business School in Boston.

== Philanthropy ==
Under Modus Games, Christina launched a charitable program called Games Giving Back as a way for her company to support different communities. The initiative sees one-time donations to different causes, often themed after the game that accompany the contribution. Christina also serves on the Advisory Board for the Exceptional Women's Awardee Foundation. She is active in supporting the advancement of women in technology and the video game industry.

== Awards ==
Executive of the Year - Consumer Products

American Business Awards

Jun 2015 - Silver Award

Female Entrepreneur of the Year - Consumer Products

Stevie Awards for Women in Business

Nov 2015 - 1st place GOLD award for leadership and management

Nov 2018 - 1st place GOLD award

Maverick of the Year

Stevie Awards for Women in Business (Silver)

Nov 2018 - SIILVER award

Women 2 Watch

Women Presidents’ Organization (WPO)

Jan 2020 - Ranked #3

== See also ==
- Modus Games
- Maximum Games
