= Rustler (video game) =

- Developer: Jutsu Games
- Publisher: Modus Games
- Engine: Unity
- Platforms: PlayStation 4; PlayStation 5; Windows; Nintendo Switch; Xbox One; Xbox Series X/S
- Release: WW: August 31, 2021
- Genre: Action-adventure
- Mode: Single-player

Rustler is an action-adventure video game developed by Jutsu Games and published by Modus Games.

== Gameplay ==
Players play as "The Guy" a peasant in a "historically inaccurate medieval setting" where the player can partake in missions or opt to roam the world and partake in activities such as stealing a horse, engage in cage matches, or cart drifting. Also, players have access to various medieval weapons such as crossbows, spears, swords and flails.

== Development ==
Developer Jutsu Games is based in Poland. Rustler first entered early access on February 18, 2021. It was fully released on Windows, Xbox One, Xbox Series X/S, PS4, PS5 and Nintendo Switch on August 31, 2021.

== Reception ==
Rustler received mixed reviews on Metacritic across all platforms. Nintendo Life praised the medieval setting but criticized what they felt were shoddy controls. Push Square called it a "fun adaptation of old-school GTA" but said it "tries a little too hard at times".
