= Maximum Football 2019 =

- Cover art featuring Doug Flutie
- Developer(s): Canuck Play Inc
- Publisher(s): Spear Interactive Inc / Maximum Games
- Designer(s): David Winter
- Series: Maximum Football
- Engine: Unity
- Platform(s): PlayStation 4, Xbox One
- Release: September 27, 2019
- Genre(s): Sports
- Mode(s): Single-player, multiplayer

Doug Flutie's Maximum Football 2019 is a gridiron football video game developed and published by Canuck Play. It is the successor to Maximum Football 2018, and the predecessor to Maximum Football 2020.

The game was released on September 27, 2019, for PlayStation 4, and Xbox One

== New additions ==
Canuck Play and Doug Flutie agreed to a multi-year relationship with Maximum Football and will lend his name and likeness to the franchise.

Canuck Play have also partnered to have equipment in the game with partners such as Xenith, Wilson Sporting Goods, Phenom Elite and Mokom Gloves.

== Features ==
Maximum Football 2019 adds a whole new college football dynasty mode, including scouting, conferences and playoffs, along with the choice of American college, or Canadian college, with American college having 130 teams, and Canadian college having 27 teams. However, college teams in the game are unlicensed, meaning that there are no official NCAA teams

The season mode that was included in Maximum Football 2018 returns in 2019, but is largely unchanged.

Customization is also available, allowing people to customize and edit players, teams, and logos.

== Reception ==
| Publication | Score |
|---|---|
| The Nerd Stash | 2/5 |
| Forbes | 2/10 |
| Sports Gamers Online | 5.75/10 |
