= Double Dragon Gaiden: Rise of the Dragons =

2023 beat 'em up video game

- Developer: Secret Base
- Publisher: Modus Games
- Director: Raymond Teo
- Producer: Raymond Teo
- Programmer: Tan Sian Yue
- Artist: Luis Peche
- Series: Double Dragon
- Engine: Unity
- Platforms: Nintendo Switch; PlayStation 4; PlayStation 5; Windows; Xbox One; Xbox Series X/S
- Release: July 27, 2023
- Genres: Beat 'em up, roguelike
- Modes: Single-player, multiplayer

Double Dragon Gaiden: Rise of the Dragons is a 2023 beat 'em up video game developed by Secret Base and published by Modus Games. It is a spin-off of the Double Dragon franchise, set before the events of the first game. It was released for the Nintendo Switch, PlayStation 4, PlayStation 5, Windows, Xbox One, and Xbox Series X/S on July 27, 2023.

The game received generally positive reviews on release, with critics comparing it favorably to the previous series entry, Double Dragon IV, while criticizing its lack of online cooperative multiplayer at release. A free downloadable expansion, Sacred Reunion, was released on April 4, 2024.

== Plot ==
In 199X, a post-apocalyptic New York City is controlled by four powerful gangs. When the Lee brothers' friend Marian is injured during a gang conflict, the newly-elected mayor arrives at their dojo and enlists the help of Billy, Jimmy, Marian, and Uncle Matin to fight back against the gangs one-by-one.

After defeating the leaders of all four gangs, the mayor asks Billy and Jimmy to become his enforcers in retaking the city. If the player accepts, the game ends; if the player refuses, the mayor reveals himself as the Mysterious Warrior from Double Dragon II: The Revenge, leading to a final level and an alternate ending.

== Gameplay ==
Double Dragon Gaiden: Rise of the Dragons is a side-scrolling action brawler, with roguelike elements between each level. Unlike previous entries, up to two players each select two characters to control as a tag team. Each character has different movement speeds, attacks, and special moves, and can switch places with their tagged-out partner at any time.

The base game includes thirteen playable characters, with only four unlocked initially; series protagonists Billy and Jimmy Lee, their friend and love interest Marian, and their guardian Uncle Matin (a new character created for the game). The remaining characters are Abobo, Burnov, Chin Tai Mei, Linda, Machine Gun Willy, Duke, Anubis, Lady Okada, and the Mysterious Warrior, (Note: Referred to in-game as "Unknown".) who appear as bosses in the story mode and can be unlocked from the in-game token shop.

In story mode, the player must defeat four different gangs: The Killers, The Royals, the Triangle cult, and the Okada Clan. These can be challenged in any order, but each time a gang is defeated, the remaining ones will become stronger, making their respective levels longer and their boss fight more difficult.

Defeated enemies drop money the player can collect, and knocking out multiple enemies at once rewards food items that restore a character's health bar. After each level, money can be used to buy character upgrades or converted to casino tokens, which are used to unlock gameplay tips, art, music, or more playable characters. If the player's characters lose all of their health, the player can either pay a portion of their tokens to restart from the nearest checkpoint, or erase their game progress and convert their remaining money into additional tokens.

A downloadable expansion, Sacred Reunion, adds online multiplayer and two new game modes: Versus, in which two players compete in tag-team battles, and Survival, in which players must fend off endless waves of enemies for as long as possible. The expansion also adds three new characters, Sonny Lee (from Double Dragon 3: The Rosetta Stone), Chin Sei Mei, and Yagyu Ranzou (from Double Dragon III: The Sacred Stones).

== Development ==
Double Dragon Gaiden's lead developer Raymond Teo became acquainted with Arc System Works (who had acquired the rights to the Double Dragon franchise in 2015) during the development of Secret Base's previous game Devil's Dare, as Arc System Works had sought to publish the game in Japan. After the release of Double Dragon IV in 2017, Secret Base sent a proposal to Arc System Works for a new Double Dragon entry with a visual mockup of the game's art style. Discussions continued for approximately another year until the project was greenlit in late 2019.

Double Dragon Gaiden: Rise of the Dragons was officially revealed on May 3, 2023, via an official website and announcement trailer featuring gameplay footage.

== Release ==
The game was released both digitally and physically on July 27, 2023, for Windows, Nintendo Switch, PlayStation 4, PlayStation 5, Xbox One, and Xbox Series X/S. The game's physical edition included a poster of the game's cover art by artist David Liu and a sheet of stickers.

On August 4, 2023, Secret Base announced plans to add online cooperative multiplayer to the game in a future update. This was confirmed on March 15, 2024, during the MIX x Kinda Funny Spring Showcase livestream, which revealed an upcoming free downloadable expansion titled Sacred Reunion, which would add online co-op, two new game modes, and three new playable characters. The expansion was released on April 4, 2024. Revealed during the MIX and Kinda Funny Spring Game Showcase 2025, Jeff and Abore were announced as free DLC for an April release. Another free downloadable update adding Super Anubis and Evil Marian as unlockable playable characters was released on August 12, 2025.

== Reception ==
Reception

Aggregate scores
Aggregator	Score
Metacritic	(NS) 67/100 (PC) 78/100 (PS5) 67/100 (XSXS) 77/100
OpenCritic	72/100

Review scores
Publication	Score
Destructoid	6.5/10
Famitsu	28/40
Game Informer	7.3/10
HobbyConsolas	85/100
IGN	7/10
Push Square	7/10 stars
Shacknews	7/10

Double Dragon Gaiden: Rise of the Dragons received "mixed or average" reviews according to review aggregator Metacritic. In Japan, four critics from Famitsu gave the game a total score of 28 out of 40, with each critic awarding the game a 7 out of 10.

Critics praised the game's animation and music, tag-team system, and replay value, but criticized it for uneven difficulty and the absence of online cooperative multiplayer at launch. Jarrett Green of IGN remarked that the tag-team system, combined with the large roster of playable characters, "turns a somewhat shallow pond of an early game experience into an impressive lake of collaborative combat options."

Jamie O'Neill of Push Square praised its roguelike progression, "which makes it a strikingly replayable contribution to the modern side-scrolling beat-'em-up resurgence," but ultimately compared it unfavorably to its genre contemporaries, writing, "since it's confined to two player local co-op, it's not as exhilarating as the six player online chaos in Teenage Mutant Ninja Turtles: Shredder's Revenge. It also lacks the consistently updated polish of Streets of Rage 4."
