= Remothered: Broken Porcelain =

2020 video game

- Developer: Stormind Games
- Publishers: Modus Games; (Maximum Games)
- Director: Chris Darril
- Producer: Antonio Cutrona
- Designer: Fabrizia Giuffrida
- Programmer: Stefano Galatà
- Artist: Omar Scala
- Writers: Chris Darril, Davide Spampinato
- Composer: Luca Balboni
- Series: Remothered
- Engine: Unreal Engine 4
- Platforms: Nintendo Switch; PlayStation 4; Windows; Xbox One; Remastered; Nintendo Switch 2; PlayStation 5; Xbox Series X/S
- Release: WW: 13 October 2020; Remastered: WW: Q1 2027
- Genre: Survival horror
- Mode: Single-player

Remothered: Broken Porcelain is a 2020 survival horror video game developed by Stormind Games and published by Modus Games. It was released on Nintendo Switch, PlayStation 4, Windows and Xbox One.

It is a follow-up to 2018's Remothered: Tormented Fathers, serving as both a prequel and a sequel. Its story follows Jennifer, a rebellious orphan, who works at the Ashmann Inn whose staff has gone mad with a murderous rage. In parallel, Rosemary Reed is still investigating the disappearance of Celeste Felton.

Created, written and directed by Chris Darril, the game was announced on 11 April 2019 on the stage of the Italian Video Game Awards in Rome by Darril, who received the award for Best Italian Game for Tormented Fathers. Broken Porcelain received mostly negative reviews.

A remaster is set to release in Q1 2027 on Microsoft Windows, Nintendo Switch 2, PlayStation 5, and Xbox Series X/S.

== Plot ==
Set in the year 1973, after her expulsion from the Flemmington Girls' Institute, an all-girls boarding school, the rebellious Jennifer suffers an injury attempting to escape from the Ashmann Inn—a rustic hotel resort (revealed to be the former RossoGallo Farms before its demise two years prior to the game's events) owned by Stefano Ashmann, the eldest son of the wealthy Ashmann family, who were business partners with RossoGallo heiress Arianna Gallo, her husband Richard Felton, and Professor Albert Elias Wyman, located at the base of Mount Etna—where she was sent to serve as one of its maids. She also has a strained relationship with fellow maid and former friend Lindsay "Linn" after having a falling out due to the failed escape. Jennifer attempts to escape again, only to witness the head maid Andrea Massino feeding a sick crow to a massive masked man who is apparently Professor Wyman. She is forced to fight Andrea, who has gone mad with a murderous rage. After defeating Andrea, Jennifer steals her master key and heads for the second floor, where she is thrown down the staircase by the masked man.

Jennifer later wakes up, with the staff claiming that she had imagined everything and that Wyman has long been dead as he committed suicide by hanging two years prior. However, Linn later approaches her, revealing that Wyman's suicide was staged and warns her that she must escape, as the staff are sure that Jennifer is Celeste Felton. Linn further explains that since Jennifer's biological mother had taken Phenoxyl while she was pregnant, Jennifer was born with a unique immunity to the harmful side effects, which is what makes her so valuable. However, Jennifer is separated from Linn and captured by the now-insane Stefano and Andrea. Stefano reveals that Jennifer was not adopted by Richard Felton, but is in fact Felton's biological daughter (as Felton is actually a woman but was forced to live as a man by his father since he was 10 years old), with Stefano himself being Jennifer's illegitimate biological father as the result of raping Felton in revenge for marrying Arianna, whom he loved before Jennifer was born. She is able to escape, but is pursued by the now insane staff. She runs into another maid, Elisa, who explains that the entire staff are being brainwashed through the inn's loudspeaker system. She directs Jennifer to head to the basement to shut down the loudspeakers, since she is the only one immune to their effects.

Jennifer proceeds into the basement of the inn, where she finds a secret Phenoxyl laboratory. There, she learns that there's an individual called a "Mother Acherontia" with the unique gift of being able to control those infected with Phenoxyl through telepathic and hypnotic means, creating a collective consciousness among the hypnotized infected. However, there is a risk that the control may backfire and the leader's own mind is absorbed into the collective consciousness through a process called a "fracture/porcelain phase", causing it to go out of control and having all of the infected fall into an endless hypnotic loop of repetition. She also learns Stefano and Wyman were responsible for directing Linn to burn down the Cristo Morente convent, fearing that Gloria Ashmann, Stefano's younger sister, would seize control of the infected away from them. However, Gloria was able to escape and Wyman was made the scapegoat of the Phenoxyl experiments, forcing him to fake his own death and hide in the Ashmann Inn. Elisa is revealed to be Gloria, who survived the fire at the convent two years prior and worked at the hotel under an alias.

Both Jennifer and Linn then escape the inn by stealing a car, though Linn reveals that Gloria tricked her into destroying Wyman's broadcast, allowing her to take full control of the collective consciousness. They are recaptured by Gloria and sent back to the inn. However, Jennifer begins regaining her memories thanks to the help of Wyman's disembodied mind, which has become separated from his body that now serves as Gloria (as Mother Acherontia)'s mindless puppet Porcelain. Jennifer remembers a song that she and Linn composed together, which is actually the trigger known as a "push" to undo the mass hypnosis. She is able to find and play the recording, breaking the loop. Linn meanwhile learns she is Wyman's daughter and escapes captivity. Andrea attempts to kill Gloria, but is killed by Stefano. Gloria, realizing Stefano, her own brother, had molested her when she was a child (resulting in their parents sending Stefano to live with a relative in the North and Gloria to the convent) and tried to kill her in the fire that destroyed the convent, orders Porcelain to attack him. She then orders Porcelain to kill Jennifer, but Linn arrives and usurps control of Porcelain, forcing Gloria to flee, but not before she kills Porcelain/Wyman by lighting him on fire and swears revenge on Jennifer's parents. Afterwards, despite having an opportunity to escape and run away together, Jennifer reluctantly parts ways with Linn, wanting to go back to her parents to warn them about Gloria's revenge, before giving Linn back her violin Red Rosemary (which Jennifer mispronounced the engraving as "Reed Rosemary").

19 years later, shortly after the deaths of Felton and Gloria, Rosemary Reed arrives at the Ashmann Inn to find Celeste with a dossier of the latter (who was under the name "Jennifer" after her disappearance in 1971) she collected from the Flemmington Girls' Institute. Stefano, now with his face heavily disfigured by a swarm of Acherontia moths summoned by Gloria, and his left arm maimed from Porcelain's attack in 1973, recognizes Reed as Linn (due to her stuttering). After sedating him with a dose of Phenoxyl and using the hallucination of Porcelain under her command, Linn kidnaps Stefano and coerces him into admitting that he had been tracking Jennifer's movements, especially after escaping from the Felton Villa, as Gloria followed her there. She now lives in Sweden as a writer under a pen name. He also further admits that he had brought in 14 other girls who were suspected to be Celeste/Jennifer, only to have them murdered by Porcelain when they were not. Linn then has the option of killing or sparing Stefano. As Linn laments, she removes her blond wig that she wore in the events of the first game and in the present day.

In the present, Madame Svenska reveals that she is in fact Celeste "Jennifer", and she had been telling the story to Giulio Manni in order to give him closure on the fate of his older sister, Rachele, who was one of the girls abducted by Stefano and murdered by Porcelain. Meanwhile Linn, after one last meeting with her beloved Jennifer, has died from Alzheimer's disease, which she inherited from Wyman. Jennifer takes it upon herself to carry the memories Linn spent so many years preserving in her stead.

== Reception ==
Reception

Aggregate scores
Aggregator	Score
Metacritic	(PC) 39/100 (PS4) 44/100 (XONE) 49/100
OpenCritic	6% recommend

Review scores
Publication	Score
GameRevolution	1/5
IGN	4/10
Jeuxvideo.com	8/20
Shacknews	3/10

Remothered: Broken Porcelain received "generally unfavorable" reviews upon release, according to review aggregator platform Metacritic. Fellow review aggregator OpenCritic assessed that the game received weak approval, being recommended by 6% of critics.
