= Marian Kelly =

Double Dragon character

- Double Dragon character
- Marian Kelly in River City Girls 2
- First appearance: Double Dragon (1987)
- Voiced by: English: Erika Harlacher (River City Girls 2); Cathy Weseluck (TV series); Christijana York (Double Dragon Neon); Amanda Gish (Double Dragon Gaiden: Rise of the Dragons); Abby Trott (Double Dragon Revive); Japanese: Hiroko Emori (Double Dragon II: The Revenge); Yuka Koyama (Double Dragon (Neo Geo)); Marina Inoue (River City Girls 2); Sayaka Senbongi (Double Dragon Revive)
- Portrayed by: Alyssa Milano

Marian Kelly is a character in the Double Dragon and Kunio-kun series. She initially appeared as a damsel in distress in the 1987 Double Dragon, kidnapped by gang members, and must be rescued by protagonists Billy and Jimmy Lee. She has been kidnapped multiple times through the series as well as murdered. In River City Girls 2, she is introduced as a powerful fighter with long white hair, having trained due to being frustrated by being kidnapped and assaulted so often. She was included in River City Girls at the request of developer WayForward Technologies, who got permission to use her. She also appears in the Double Dragon film, portrayed by Alyssa Milano.

Marian has been identified as an iconic character due to how often she becomes a victim in Double Dragon. Her role and design in River City Girls was well received, with multiple critics identifying it as an upgrade compared to her standard design.

== Appearances ==
Marian Kelly first appears in the Double Dragon series as a damsel in distress in the first game, kidnapped by gang members and forced to be rescued by her boyfriend Billy Lee and his brother, Jimmy. Once they reach Marian and defeat the gang's leader, the two brothers fight over who should date her before she is rescued, with one of them winning the fight and her love. In Double Dragon II, Marian is assassinated by this same gang, and must be avenged. After having gotten revenge, Marian is revived. In the NES version of Double Dragon III, Marian, called Marion, is the final boss in the English version, having been possessed and assuming the name "Empress Noiram", being Marion backwards. In the Japanese version, Marian is not present, and the final boss is called Cleopatra. The game Super Double Dragon serves as a reboot of the first Double Dragon, introducing her as a cop who has gone missing while undercover. In the 3D reboot Double Dragon II: Wander of the Dragons, she is briefly playable in the beginning of the game before being murdered, leading to Billy and Jimmy seeking revenge. A secondary mode allows players to choose Marian to fight waves of enemies. She is kidnapped again in Double Dragon Neon by a gang leader called Skullmageddon, who briefly transformers her into Evil Marian for a boss fight before being returned to normal. After being rescued, she retaliates by punching him in the crotch.

In the Kunio-kun series, starting with River City Girls, Marian appears as a character, assisting the protagonists by selling them items. She would later appear in River City Girls 2 as a playable character, utilizing a grappler fighting style. She was also featured in the video game Double Dragon Gaiden: Rise of the Dragons as one of its playable characters, utilizing a gun in combat; her Evil Marian form was later made playable in a free downloadable update. Another game, Double Dragon Revive, features her as a playable character.

A Marvel Comics Double Dragon comic book series features Marian as an cop who got captured while undercover, who the protagonists Billy and Jimmy fight over. She also appears in the Double Dragon film, portrayed by Alyssa Milano, as the leader of a vigilante group called Power Corps, as well as the Double Dragon animated series, where she is voiced by Cathy Weseluck.

== Concept and creation ==
Marian Kelly is initially featured in the video game Double Dragon as a damsel in distress. She appears in a similar role across multiple games, but received a redesign and different role in River City Girls, gaining a stronger physique and white hair. In some roles, she works as a police officer or detective. After having decided to include her in the game, developer WayForward asked the character's rightsholder, Arc System Works, for permission, who were enthusiastic about the idea. Her identity was not initially clear, as she was not named in-game, though the game's developer, WayForward, confirmed on Twitter that this was Marian, saying she was "tired of being a damsel in distress." Artist Rem elaborated upon this, clarifying that Marian got so built because of how often she is kidnapped and assaulted. She was included as a playable character in River City Girls 2 following her popularity in the first game. Her fighting style is an incorporation of different styles, including boxing and wrestling, though her design was intended to not simply be the "slow but powerful wrestler" archetype. She is unique among the cast as the only character who can do a command grab.

When selecting playable characters in Double Dragon Gaiden: Rise of the Dragons to include, game designer Raymond Teo identified her as an "easy pick" due to her recognizability. He also felt that her being a cop and training to fight helped the decision, and made for an interesting gun-based play style.

Marian has been voiced by multiple actresses across different languages over the years, including Amanda Gish, Yuka Yokama, Christijana York, and Hiroko Emori. In River City Girls 2, she is voiced in Japanese by Marina Inoue and in English by Erika Harlacher.

== Reception ==
Marian has been identified as one of the most iconic victims, with Game Kult writer Virgile noting that she has not been valued as a character in the series. She is also considered an early example of a damsel in distress, as well as for being the object of both Billy and Jimmy Lee's affection, particularly the fight they have over her. Games critic Anita Sarkeesian identified her kidnapping in the original game as an iconic scene, discussing how multiple iterations of this scene across the series exposes her panties. Writer Bonnie Harris-Lowe discussed the propensity of video games to feature damsels in distress getting one over on their assailants, specifically citing Marian in Double Dragon Neon. However, she notes that this occurs after the credits roll, and does not cancel out the fact that she was damsels in distress through the game.

Writer Eugene F. Provenzo discussed Marian's role in the game as well as the cover art of Double Dragon II. He stated that she wore a "torn mini-dress" that shows off her "curvaceous" thighs and buttocks, and her tank top ripped, with her breasts and midriff pressed against Billy's chest. He discussed how NES box art and game stories tended to portray women as victims. He also discussed how the use of violence against women is often used as a motivating tool for the protagonist in NES games, citing Marian in Double Dragon II as an example. He felt that the respective role of Marian and the Lee brothers represented certain archetypes that men and women are meant to fall under.

Marian's redesign in River City Girls was met with positive reception, receiving attention on Twitter by people who were attracted to her. Polygon writer Ian Walker felt that where her original design was difficult to recognize, her new design was more recognizable due to her athletic outfit, white hair, and her physique. Walker noted that, while women in real life should not need to become stronger in order to avoid violence, he appreciated that River City Girls gave her more of a character, stating that her new design made her stand out compared to her old design. Anime News Network writer Jean-Karlo Lemus was disappointed that Marian's appearance in Double Dragon Gaiden: Rise of the Dragons was not the one from River City Girls, but still appreciated that it played well with her original design. Nintendo Life writer Scott McCrae felt that Marian was the highlight of the cast of River City Girls 2, enjoying her boxing-based moveset.
