= Override 2: Super Mech League =

Fighting video game

- North American PlayStation 4 cover art for the Ultraman Deluxe Edition
- Developer: Modus Studios Brazil
- Publisher: Modus Games
- Writer: Genese Davis
- Composer: Marcus Hedges
- Engine: Unreal Engine 4
- Platforms: PlayStation 4; PlayStation 5; Xbox One; Xbox Series X/S; Nintendo Switch; Windows
- Genre: Fighting
- Mode: Single-player

Override 2: Super Mech League is a mech-fighting video game developed by Modus Studios Brazil (formerly The Balance, Inc.) and published by Modus Games. It was released for Xbox One, Xbox Series X/S, PlayStation 4, PlayStation 5, Nintendo Switch and Microsoft Windows on 22 December 2020. It is a sequel to the 2018 game, Override: Mech City Brawl.

== Gameplay ==
The gameplay has been revamped and had major changes introduced. This includes the ability to now lift and throw your opponents, new attacks for each mech and more fast pace combat. The game no longer has a set story mode as the first game did. Instead, it now focuses on the player moving up the ranks in league matches and unlocking the garage through the leagues.

There are still different multiplayer modes and offline matches that allows players to fight, team up or fight different mechs with up to four players at one time. The gameplay mechanics and league mode seem to be inspired by the direct-to-mobile game, Real Steel and older established titles like Godzilla: Save the Earth.

== Mechs ==
The same mechs from the first game return although with the addition of new mechs such as:

- Atlas
- Aura
- Bellona
- Cocada
- Contessa
- Crystal
- Maestro
- Megaton
- Metageckon
- Mya
- Pescado
- Rocca
- Setesh
- Shifu
- Sprinkles
- Stardust
- Toasty
- Vidar
- Vintage
- Watchbot

There is also an Ultraman Deluxe Edition of the game which adds Ultraman, Bemular, Black King, and Ultraseven.

== Reception ==
Upon its release, Override 2: Super Mech League was met with "mixed or average reviews" according to video game review aggregator Metacritic, with aggregate scores of 63/100 on all platforms. Fellow review aggregator OpenCritic assessed that the game received weak approval, being recommended by 17% of critics.
