= Cris Tales =

2021 video game

- Developers: Dreams Uncorporated; Syck
- Publisher: Modus Games
- Composer: Tyson Wernli
- Platforms: Google Stadia; Microsoft Windows; Nintendo Switch; PlayStation 4; PlayStation 5; Xbox One; Xbox Series X/S
- Release: July 20, 2021
- Genre: Role-playing
- Mode: Single-player

Cris Tales (stylized as CrisTales) is a role-playing video game developed by Colombian indie game studios Dreams Uncorporated and Syck, and published by Modus Games. It was released for Google Stadia, Microsoft Windows, Nintendo Switch, PlayStation 4, PlayStation 5, Xbox One, and Xbox Series X/S on July 20, 2021.

== Gameplay ==
Promotional screenshot showcasing combat. In Cris Tales, the player can use Crystal Points to affect the stats of enemies.

The game is a turn-based RPG, along with the ability to time jump, both on the map and in-battle, affecting the gameplay. Each playable character has their own unique abilities.

The primary game mechanic consists on the manipulation of time. The screen is split into three sections, showing the present in the center, the past on the left, and the future on the right. During the story, Crisbell must complete a series of missions with the help of Matias, where she must use her time powers to learn from the past and use it to save the present thus creating a different future. Depending on the player's choices, they could affect the lives of NPCs, thus resulting in one of three different endings.

In battle, Crisbell can summon the crystal powers to send enemies to the past or the future, altering their characteristics (e.g planting a potential poison attack as Wilhelm in the past will cause that enemy to be poisoned in the future). The battles are carried out using commands to select attacks, skills, or items, in addition to making the precise pressing of buttons during attacks, allowing more damage to enemies or receiving less damage.

In addition to the main story, the demo includes a Colosseum mode, where the player faces a horde of enemies, in order to test their skills. This mode appears in the final game near a later point in a post-launch patch.

== Plot ==
Crisbell is an orphan girl who lives in the Narim orphanage. While she picked up a rose for Mother Superior, it is snatched from her by Matias, a talking frog, whom she follows to Narim Cathedral (inspired by the Las Lajas Shrine). In doing so, Matias gets Crisbell to unleash her powers, and guides her to visit his friend Willhelm, a time mage, who explains more about her powers.

By the time Crisbell has gotten a basic understanding of using her powers, she finds the village farm up in flames and invaded by goblins under the command of the Empress of Time, whose aim is to take over the Crystallis Kingdom. Determined to avoid a disastrous future, Crisbell returns to Willhelm to ask for help, and he tells her about a nearby Sword. Wielding its powers with her own, Crisbell becomes a time mage herself.

With the Sword in hand, she returns to the farm to battle the goblins. During the battle, Cristopher, an elemental mage warrior who has been fighting the goblins, joins her. After a couple of battles, they are faced by the Empress of Time's minions, the Volcano Sisters. After receiving several attacks, the sisters retreat.

Crisbell travels with Cristopher and Willhelm to seek out various stained glass cathedrals and defeat the Time Empress. She goes to St. Clarity, meets Cristopher's parents, Armando and Sophia, and defeats Mayor Enzo.

Next, Crisbell goes to Neva Tulira, and solves a murder mystery involving Lady Gladys, Willhelm's late friend, and defeats Rhallus Oroitz, a resurrected matriarch.

Then, Crisbell goes to Cinder, where she and her group become involved in a political struggle concerning First Citizen Azufra, his wife Fenia, and the Volcano Sisters.

After this, Crisbell goes to Crystallis and defeats the Empress, but the Empress is revealed to have left behind a failsafe to trigger huge explosions that devastate the world.

Matias brings Crisbell back to Crystallis and reveals a secret machine that allows Crisbell to travel back in time by a short amount, to before Crisbell defeated the Empress.

Crisbell travels to ancient Rena ruins in the world to deactivate the Empress's failsafe, and defeats her again.

Matias then transforms into a man named Ardo, an ancient Rena scientist who wishes to resurrect his race by overwriting the world, killing all humans in the process via planetary-scale time jump, restoring the memories of the Witnesses to recruit their aid in opposing Crisbell.

With her last breath, the Empress reveals that she is actually a future version of Crisbell, who came from the world’s future to battle Ardo, as Crisbell’s grandmother once did, as part of a never-ending cycle of conflict.

Crisbell travels to the Rena Ruins of the four kingdoms again, battling the four Witnesses: Nasar, Buki, Paulina, and JKR-721, convincing them to give her a chance to settle the conflict between humans and Renans peacefully.

Confronting Ardo in a final battle, there are two ways for the conflict to conclude:

If Crisbell’s party is defeated, Crisbell has the option of heeding the Empress’s advice, using Ardo’s machine to go back in time and destroy the Ruins, prompting a short ending scene where Crisbell goes back in time and greets the Willhelm of the past.

If Crisbell’s party wins, Ardo is adamant about completing his revenge, but Crisbell convinces Ardo to seek out a peaceful solution, by bringing the ancient Rena civilization far enough into the future to split the timeline, allowing both worlds to exist at the same time. This succeeds, at the cost of Crisbell sacrificing herself to complete the jump.

Ardo and the Witnesses depart for the Rena world of the future, while JKR-721 and Paulina elect to stay in the human world. If all of the side quests were completed and the futures of St. Clarity, Neva Tulira and Cinder were improved, there is an extended ending sequence that that shows the fates of Crisbell’s party. Cristopher goes on a date with Rysa in Neva Tulira, Volcano and Galley work to restore Cinder, Zas and Kari visit their father’s grave, and JKR-721 continues to roam across the world in search of new experiences.

Ardo travels the Rena world and is surprised by the presence of an unrevealed person, possibly implied to be Crisbell.

If the player completes the optional DLC dungeon, Adri the inventor joins the party and they battle a mysterious fifth Witness named Alexandre. By doing so, it alters the ending sequence so that Crisbell eventually returns to the Narim orphanage as an old woman.

== Development ==
The game was developed by the indie Colombian studio Dreams Uncorporated. It was officially announced at E3 2019, which was claimed as a tribute to classic Japanese role-playing games (JRPGs) like Final Fantasy, Chrono Trigger and Persona, among other franchises. Its launch was scheduled for November 2020, but was postponed to early 2021, in order to bring a better product.

In addition to the influences of the aforementioned JRPGs, Cris Tales shows influences from Colombian culture and architecture. For its art style, the game was influenced by the works of Genndy Tartakovsky, Mary Blair, Eyvind Earle, among others; while the character designs were inspired by the 2009 animated film The Secret of Kells.

== Reception ==
Reception

Aggregate scores
Aggregator	Score
Metacritic	NS: 72/100 (Note: Based on 26 reviews); PC: 74/100 (Note: Based on 29 reviews); PS4: 70/100 (Note: Based on 6 reviews); PS5: 69/100 (Note: Based on 25 reviews); XSXS: 79/100 (Note: Based on 10 reviews)
OpenCritic	46% recommend

Review scores
Publication	Score
Game Informer	7.75/10
GameSpot	PC: 8/10
IGN	7/10
Nintendo Life	NS: 8/10
PC Gamer (US)	PC: 57/100
The Guardian	4/5

During its development within early release gameplay livestreams, Cris Tales received critical acclaim by specialized media. Hardcore Gamer cited it as "an unmissable, gorgeous manipulation of time" and nominated it as the Game of Show and Best RPG at E3 2019. Tom Marks from IGN claims that Cris Tales "looks a bit like Paper Mario with Persona 5's UI", praising the concept, the hand-drawn graphics, and the time jump-based gameplay.

After its release, Cris Tales received "mixed or average reviews" on Metacritic, with an aggregated score of 74/100 for the PC version based on 29 reviews. Nintendo Life praised the premise for taking the classic JRPGs in gameplay ideas and art style, but criticized some aspects of the combat, calling it "frustrating". IGN praised the cast and the art, but criticised the gameplay, citing it as "a clever time-traveling JRPG that’s held back by monotonous combat". A less favorable review came from PC Gamer, which cited it as "a striking RPG that fails to deliver on its temporal premise".

The local media said that "Cris Tales is a game with an excellent premise, but one that has lagged behind remembering the past."
