= Cross Racing Championship 2005 =

2005 racing video game

Cross Racing Championship 2005/Extreme
- Cover of 2005 version of the game
- Developer: Invictus Games
- Publishers: Invictus Games; Take 2 Interactive (USA); CD Expert (Brazil)
- Platform: Microsoft Windows
- Release: October 4, 2005; September 18, 2018
- Genre: Racing
- Modes: Single-player, Multiplayer

Cross Racing Championship 2005 (CRC 2005) is a racing video game developed by Invictus Games and released on October 4, 2005, for Microsoft Windows. The Hungarian metal band SZEG contributed to the soundtrack. The game combines elements of rallycross with those of tuning. In some regions it was also launched as Cross Racing Championship Extreme (CRC Extreme), including in its the Steam store relaunch on September 18, 2018.

== Gameplay ==
The game does not have a fixed plot: it is more a combination of a race, a race with time, a unique race and a multiplayer mode typical of racing games. In addition, CRC 2005 also has a mode called "Free Ride", which allows the player to freely explore locations rather than driving on defined routes, allowing access to places that are not accessible in normal races.

The game has two different multiplayer modes: online multiplayer and LAN multiplayer, which allows a certain number of players to play together on their own computers via the Internet. The online multiplayer servers have now been shut down. However, it is still possible to play over the Internet through LAN or a virtual LAN. A special feature is the "hot seat": here several players take turns on a computer and try to achieve the best time on a previously selected track. This mode can also be used offline.

Career mode is the heart of the game, and before the new vehicles, routes, and parts are available to the player in the other modes, they must be unlocked there. The player can choose a paint design and starting number. The player starts with classic series vehicles in standard equipment on muddy tracks, then progresses through snow and road races to finally compete in an asphalt racing circuit. In each race, the player has to compete against up to eight computer opponents. As their careers progress, they get better control of their vehicles and can also be hostile or fearful of the player. This can lead to situations where one driver does not defend against overtaking while the other defends and even deliberately hits the player. AI opponents always have the same start number and livery, making them distinguishable from a distance.

The game has destruction and physics mechanics. For example, depending on the severity of the impact, dents of different sizes are displayed on the vehicle. The bumpers can fall off and even the entire body can be deformed. It is also possible to start tires and damage them. The vehicle can be repaired at the push of a button after too much damage - the player returns to the race without wasting much time. However, this feature can also be disabled, forcing the player to drive more carefully.

== Vehicles ==
The game has a total of eight vehicles, which are inspired by real cars but have fancy names for licensing reasons. There are also some deviations in the body.

A list of vehicles with the names given in the game and the models it was based from in parentheses:

- Quadro AD (Audi Quattro)
- Corus (Ford Focus/Opel Corsa)
- Pickup (Ford Ranger)
- Scheforn (Porsche 911)
- C-Racer 4x4 (Mitsubishi Pajero)
- T8 Classic (Donkervoort D8 GTO)
- Revo GT (BMW E36)
- Buggy (VW Buggy)

Also, there are many mods mainly from Eastern Europe that add more vehicles to the game.

An important aspect of the game is tuning. If the player starts with vehicles from the series without changes, he can improve them by unlocking parts during the game and significantly increasing the overall performance. Adjustments can be made to the engine, transmission, brake, suspension, differential and all-wheel drive for vehicles that are They are actually only delivered with front-wheel drive, as well as in the body. The player can also choose from a range of different paint finishes. The player must also choose the most suitable tire compound from a total of six sets for different surfaces. The wrong choice of tires can make driving difficult or impossible.

== Tracks ==
The game has six different locations. Depending on the race, these are staked differently with railings to form a route. So the player often drives in the same place during his career, but always on slightly different routes. All locations are imaginative, but each contains elements typical of the country in which they are supposed to be located.

Races in United Kingdom take place on public but closed roads and dirt roads through a forest. There is an autumnal atmosphere. France offers summer races on serpentine and short gravel roads. In races United States take place on the beach, clearly reminiscent of the California's atmosphere. Winter runs through snowy forests and frozen lakes offer Finland. In Germany distance races are run on a comprehensive course, which is based on Nürburgring and Hockenheimring. Typical races Rallycross, on the other hand, take place on a route consisting of concrete, mud and earth in Hungary.

== Extra ==
The player may copy their own music as MP3 files in the game folder. These can be selected and played in-game. This is also possible during a race or while driving. A demo version limited to two races was included on many compilation CDs in Europe.

== Reception ==
Reception

Aggregate score
Aggregator	Score
Metacritic	77/100

Review scores
Publication	Score
4Players	7/10
IGN	7.5/10
Jeuxvideo.com	9/20
PC Games (DE)	7/10

The game was rated as good, but was not widely known. Metacritic awarded 77 out of 100 possible points.
