= Give It Up! (video game) =

2014 video game

- App icon
- Developer: Invictus Games
- Publisher: Invictus Games
- Platforms: Android, iOS
- Release: December 18, 2014
- Genres: Rhythm, platform
- Mode: Single-player

Give It Up! is a 2014 rhythm platform game developed and published by the Hungarian indie studio Invictus Games. It was released on December 18, 2014, for Android and iOS. The player is tasked with controlling a black blob and must avoid obstacles by jumping over them to the beat of a song. A sequel for the game was released on October 29, 2015.

== Gameplay ==
The game contains a total of nine different music tracks. To unlock each track, the player must complete the previous track without making a single mistake. Throughout each level, the background shows what percentage of the level the player has completed. If the player makes a mistake in the level before reaching the end at 100%, they are forced to start again.

The game contains only a single control, which is tapping the screen. The player has to time their taps, to ensure that they avoid the various obstacles (such as spikes) throughout the levels. The player can also fail a level by jumping too early and hitting a wall. The "safe" platforms that the player can land on during the levels are grey, but they turn green when stepped on. The obstacles are red.

== Reception ==
Give It Up! received "mixed or average" reviews, with a Metacritic score of 58 out of 100, based on reviews from 4 critics. TouchArcade criticized the game for its repetition and lack of different songs in each level. The same review praised Give It Up! for its responsiveness and smooth running. Other reviews were unimpressed by the game for its difficulty and how frustrating it was. It was also criticized for becoming largely a memorization challenge.

The sequel generally received more positive reviews, with TouchArcade giving the game a 4.5 out of 5.
