= Hammerwatch =

2013 video game

- Developer: Crackshell
- Publisher: Crackshell
- Platforms: Linux, Microsoft Windows, OS X, Nintendo Switch, PlayStation 4, Xbox One
- Release: Linux, Windows, OS X; 12 August 2013; NS, PS4, XBO; 14 December 2017
- Genres: Hack and slash, action-adventure
- Modes: Single-player, multiplayer

Hammerwatch is a 2013 hack and slash and action-adventure game by Swedish studio Crackshell. It was released for Linux, Microsoft Windows and OS X in August 2013, followed by released for Nintendo Switch, PlayStation 4 and Xbox One in December 2017. It was followed by Heroes of Hammerwatch and Hammerwatch 2.

== Gameplay ==
The gameplay of the game is similar to Diablo and other hack and slash video games. The player is in a castle and must kill hundreds of enemies. Like in the first edition of Diablo, there are no skill trees in Hammerwatch. The player buys skills from traders across the maps. Hammerwatch has six character classes: paladin, wizard, ranger, thief, warlock and priest.

== Development ==
The game was developed by Jochum Skoglund and Niklas Myrberg. It was mainly inspired by the Gauntlet games. The game was put on Steam Greenlight and was accepted on 17 April 2013. A first beta was released in February 2013.

The game was released on 12 August 2013 on Steam and the DRM-free store gog.com.

=== Expansion ===
An expansion for Hammerwatch, called Temple of the Sun, was released on 16 September 2014. It was released for free, as a patch. It contains a new campaign that takes place in the desert. It adds new themes, bosses and challenges.

== Reception ==
Hammerwatch received a score of 75/100 on GameFront and a score of 7/10 on Destructoid. Hammerwatch has an average rating of 72 out of 100 at Metacritic, based on 5 critic reviews. It had 2,500 pre-orders and sold 12,000 units on the first 24 hours on Steam.

The game was in the top 30 of the most anticipated indie games of 2013 on Destructoid.
