= Street Legal (video game) =

2002 video game

- Developer: Invictus Games
- Publisher: Activision Value
- Series: Street Legal
- Platform: Microsoft Windows
- Release: 30 October 2002
- Genre: Racing
- Mode: Single player

Street Legal is a racing video game developed by Invictus Games and published by Activision Value with a heavy emphasis on car customisation. It is the first game in the Street Legal series.

A re-release of the game titled Street Legal 1: REVision by ImageCode LLC, was released on Steam in 2022.

== Gameplay ==
The game takes place in the fictional Valo City. There are four sections of the city, although only one is unlocked from the beginning of the game. Other parts of the city, as well as more cars available and upgrade parts, are unlocked by racing against AI drivers.

The cars in the game are all fictionalised variations of real vehicles. Examples are the "Ninja", a vehicle resembling a Honda Civic hatchback, and the "Badge", which mimics the Dodge Charger.

The gameplay is highly mechanically oriented and almost all parts on all cars are replaceable. Although the level of detail is not quite equal to that of the sequel, Street Legal Racing: Redline, full engines can be replaced and almost all body parts can be removed from the vehicle. The damage in the game is also highly detailed, but there is no way to repair the entire car after it has been damaged, and repairing it is costly and time-consuming.

== Development ==
The game, developed in 2002, has relatively advanced graphics for its time, but the game's code was written in a way that makes it run slow, even on computers that meet the recommended requirements. There are patches for the game that greatly improve performance and reduce the number of bugs.

== Sequel ==
A sequel called Street Legal Racing: Redline (also known as Street Legal 2) was developed by Invictus in 2003.
