= Give It All Up =

Give It All Up may refer to:

- "Give It All Up", a song by Craig Davis from 22 (2022)
- "Give It All Up", a song by the Corrs from In Blue (2000)

== See also ==
- Give Up (disambiguation)
- Give It Up (disambiguation)
