= Remothered: Tormented Fathers =

2018 video game

- Developer: Stormind Games (Note: Ported to Nintendo Switch by Dico Co., Ltd.)
- Publisher: Darril Arts (Note: Published physically on PlayStation 4, Xbox One, and Nintendo Switch by Soedesco)
- Director: Chris Darril
- Designer: Chris Darril
- Programmer: Rosario Terranova
- Artist: Omar Scala
- Writer: Chris Darril
- Composers: Luca Balboni; Nobuko Toda
- Series: Remothered
- Engine: Unreal Engine 4
- Platforms: Windows; PlayStation 4; Xbox One; Nintendo Switch; Remastered; Nintendo Switch 2; PlayStation 5; Xbox Series X/S
- Release: Windows; 30 January 2018; PlayStation 4, Xbox One; 25 July 2018; Nintendo Switch; 6 September 2019; Remastered; Windows, Switch 2, PS5, Xbox Series X/S; Q1 2027
- Genre: Survival horror
- Mode: Single-player

Remothered: Tormented Fathers is a 2018 survival horror video game created and directed by Chris Darril, developed by Stormind Games and published by Darril Arts. The game was originally released digitally on PlayStation 4, Xbox One, and Microsoft Windows. A Nintendo Switch version was released digitally in 2019, in collaboration with developer Dico Co., Ltd. The game was also released physically in October 2019 by publisher Soedesco.

Created, written and directed by Italian video game artist and director Chris Darril, it has been described as a homage to the Japanese survival horror series Clock Tower. Its story follows Rosemary Reed, a woman who arrives at the Felton family's mansion to investigate the disappearance of the daughter, Celeste, some years before. When the owner, Richard, realizes Rosemary's true intentions, a terrifying night begins.

Tormented Fathers received generally positive reviews from critics. A sequel, Broken Porcelain, was released in October 2020. A remaster is set to release in Q1 2027 on Microsoft Windows, Nintendo Switch 2, PlayStation 5, and Xbox Series X/S.

== Plot ==
An old woman named Madame Svenska meets a young man named Mr. Manni, to whom she begins recounting an old story so that it will not be forgotten.

In the year 1992, a mysterious woman named Rosemary Reed (Danielle McRae) heads to the villa of Dr. Richard Felton (Adam Harrington), a retired notary, to discuss how to treat the mysterious and incurable illness he suffers from. During the interview, it is revealed that Felton's adopted daughter, Celeste, ran away from home 21 years prior and his now deceased former business partner, Professor Albert Elias Wyman, was the prime suspect for her disappearance. However, it is quickly revealed that Reed only used the medical interview as a pretext to find out the truth behind Celeste's disappearance. Angered, Felton orders Reed to leave the villa.

Later that night, Reed sneaks back into the villa using a spare key left by Felton's nurse, Gloria Ashmann (Lani Minella), in order to find Felton's wife, Arianna Gallo, who might have the answers she's looking for. However, upon reaching Arianna's bedroom, Reed only finds a decomposed corpse and soon begins having to scour the villa for more clues while a psychotic Felton stalks the halls. Eventually, Reed finds out from a recorded hypnosis session that Celeste had actually returned home after her disappearance but due to his madness, Felton came to believe Celeste was a different girl named Jennifer (Olivia Steele) and murdered her. Just as Reed manages to escape from her bindings, a masked nun dressed in red appears in the villa and begins chasing both Reed and Felton. Eventually, Reed sees a young woman that flees into attic; upon finding something to help get up there, Reed is then attacked by the mysterious girl and falls down the ladder, knocking herself unconscious.

When Reed finally regains consciousness, the woman apologizes for attacking her and tells her of a hidden room Felton sealed away. Reed finds and opens the sealed room, discovering that it was originally Celeste's bedroom. After investigating, Reed discovers a tape recorder that reveals how, after Celeste returned home, she was imprisoned within the villa alongside Arianna by Felton and subjected to forced hypnosis sessions which gradually began to destroy her memories, leading her to desperately try and find a way to escape. Reed eventually finds and follows Celeste's escape route but ends up falling into the sewers beneath the villa and is hunted by the red nun again. Upon climbing back up to the surface of the mansion, Reed discovers Felton's birth certificate, listing his name as "Jennifer Richardine Felton". This knowledge causes Reed to realize that Felton was actually born a girl but was raised as a boy and given testosterone treatments by her cruel father, leading Felton to developing a split personality, creating the "Richard" and "Jennifer" personas. In fact, the young woman Reed met earlier was actually Felton in their Jennifer character.

After a dangerous encounter with Jennifer, Reed winds up meeting Felton's nurse, Gloria Ashmann and warns her about Felton's madness. Gloria is shocked that Felton murdered Arianna, and confirms all of the revelations about Celeste and Felton's past. However, Gloria then drugs Reed, revealing herself to actually be the red nun. Reed attempts to escape but is then captured by Felton. When Reed wakes up, Gloria reveals that she had been experimenting on Felton for revenge and manipulated him into murdering Arianna, but Celeste was able to escape. Gloria then orders Felton to kill Reed in a murder–suicide. Fortunately, Reed is able to escape and manages to kill Felton by setting him on fire, after he drenched himself with kerosene. Reed then heads to the attic where she find Celeste's escape route and tricks Gloria into falling out of a window.

Reed approaches the mortally wounded Gloria, who reveals that she, Felton, and her fellow nuns of the Cristo Morente convent near the Rosso Gallo farms were subjected to inhumane experiments by Wyman in order to perfect "Phenoxyl", an anti-psychotropic drug created by Felton, the Ashmanns, and Professor Wyman himself by synthesizing a rare species of parasitic moth to repress and erase traumatic memories that was eventually banned in the late 1960s for its horrific side effects, including severe photosensitivity, hallucinations, ulcers, proliferation of the parasitic moths, and homicidal rage.

Gloria then recognizes Reed as one of her fellow nuns, who set fire to the entire project to put a stop to the experiments conducted on the nuns of the convent. Reed confirms it but says her memories of that period are still missing. Gloria apologizes to and forgives Reed, telling her to keep searching for Celeste before finally dying. Reed returns to Celeste's room with a piano key Gloria gave to her and finds a clue, a luggage tag pointing her towards the Flemmington Girls' Institute, an all-girls' boarding school.

Back in the present, Madame Svenska tells Mr. Manni that Reed continued her search for Celeste.

== Production ==
The first version of Remothered was a one-man-only-project developed on Enterbrain's Rpg Maker Xp, with 2D and oil painting aesthetics and similarities to Clock Tower. The project was cancelled in 2012 by Chris Darril himself with the objective of making a stronger version with new 3D engine.

The title Remothered is a combination of the words REM (rapid eye movement), moth, mother, other and red, all of which refer to the game's story and symbolism.

The main character Rosemary Reed is modeled after the features of Jodie Foster. According to Italian website Upside Down Magazine, the game is an homage to many films such as Alfred Hitchcock's Psycho, The Birds, Stanley Kubrick's The Shining, David Lynch's Mulholland Dr., Dario Argento's Deep Red, Jonathan Demme's The Silence of the Lambs and Roman Polanski's Rosemary's Baby, but also to other media, from television series to video games such as Twin Peaks, The Evil Within, Rule of Rose, Clock Tower and Silent Hill.

== Reception ==
=== Critical response ===
Reception

Aggregate score
| Aggregator | Score |
|---|---|
| Metacritic | PC: 77/100; PS4: 75/100; XONE: 68/100; NS: 55/100 |

According to the review aggregation website Metacritic, the game received "generally favorable reviews" for Windows and PlayStation 4 versions, and "mixed or average reviews" for Xbox One and Nintendo Switch versions. Eurogamer Italia praised the game for its atmosphere, gameplay and story, but noted minor technical issues and "woody" animations.

On 22 July 2018, three days prior to Remothered's console release, Keiichiro Toyama, creator of Silent Hill and Forbidden Siren, expressed his admiration for the game and hoped to collaborate with Chris Darril.

=== Accolades ===
In 2018, Tormented Fathers was included in the list of "The Scariest Games of All Time" by GameSpot.

| Year | Award | Category | Result | Ref. |
|---|---|---|---|---|
| 2019 | NAVGTR Awards | Best Writing in a Drama | Nominated | |
| 2018 | Eurogamer Awards | Best Indie Game | Won | |
| 2018 | Eurogamer Awards | Best Italian Game | Won | |
| 2018 | Italian Video Game Awards | Best Italian Debut Game | Nominated | |
| 2018 | Italian Video Game Awards | Best Italian Game | Won | |
| 2018 | TGM Awards | Best Horror Game | Won | |
| 2018 | TGM Awards | Best Italian Game | Won | |

== Future ==
A successor that serves as a prequel and a sequel, titled Remothered: Broken Porcelain, was announced in April 2019 during the Italian Video Game Awards. It was released on 13 October 2020 for PlayStation 4, Xbox One, Microsoft Windows and Nintendo Switch.

On 29 January 2021, a digital spin-off director's cut graphic novel named Remothered: A Lamb to the Slaughter – Book 1 was also released via Steam and GOG.com. The comic book is set in between Tormented Fathers and Broken Porcelain.
