= Invictus Games (company) =

Hungarian independent video game studio

Invictus Team Ltd.
- Type: Private
- Industry: Video games
- Founded: 1999
- Headquarters: Debrecen, Hungary
- Products: onEscapee; Insane; Cross Racing Championship 2005; Project Torque
- Parent: Zordix (2020–2024)

Invictus Games is an independent Hungarian video game development studio founded in 1992 by Tamás Kozák and Ákos Diviánszky. They specialize in racing simulation games, like Project Torque, Street Legal and Street Legal Racing Redline, and Insane. In 2009, they have moved on to mobile games. They also developed onEscapee, a cinematic platforming game. Their publishers include Codemasters, Activision, 1C, Gamepot and Joyzone.

In March 2020, Invictus Games was acquired by Swedish publisher Zordix.

== Games developed ==
Year	Title	Publisher(s)	Genre
1997	onEscapee	Sadeness Software	Action-adventure
2000	Insane	Codemasters	Off-road racing
2002	Street Legal	Activision Value	Racing
2003	Street Legal Racing: Redline	Activision Value	Racing
2004	Monster Garage	Activision Value	Simulation
2005	Cross Racing Championship 2005	Project Three Interactive BV	Racing
2006	L.A. Street Racing	Groove Games	Racing
2008	Project Torque	Aeria Games	Racing MMO
2009	4x4 Jam	Self-published	Off-road racing
2010	Fly Fu	Self-published	Action-adventure
2010	Truck Jam	Self-published	Off-road racing
2010	Froggy Jump		
2011	Greed Corp		
2011	Race of Champions		Racing
2013	Ridge Racer Slipstream	Bandai Namco Entertainment	Racing
2014	Pac-Man Friends	Bandai Namco Entertainment	Platformer
2014	Dustoff Heli Rescue		
2014	Give It Up!		Rhythm
2015	Daytona Rush		Endless-runner / racing
2015	Give It Up! 2		Rhythm
2016	Dustoff Heli Rescue 2		
2016	15 Temumuz The Game		
2017	Highway Getaway: Police Chase	Vivid Games	Endless-runner / racing
2017	Gummy Heroes		
2017	Give It Up! 3		Rhythm
2018	NASCAR Rush		Endless-runner / racing
2019	Give It Up! Bouncy		Rhythm
2019	Give It Up! Dash		Rhythm
2020	Dustoff Z		
