= List of Xbox One games (A–L) =

This is a list of Xbox One games currently planned or released either at retail or via download. (Note: For a chronological list, click the sort button in any of the available region's columns. Games dated November 22, 2013 (North America and Europe) and September 4, 2014 (Japan) are launch titles for the specified regions.) See List of Xbox 360 & Xbox games for Xbox One for Xbox 360 & Xbox running on Xbox One with an emulator.

== List ==
There are currently 3148 games on both parts of this list. (Note: This number is always up to date by this script.)

CP Cross-play	K Kinect optional K required	HDR High Dynamic Range	PA Xbox Play Anywhere	X Xbox One X Enhanced	FPSB FPS Boost on Xbox Series X/S	XD Disc to Digital Licensing on XBOX

Title	Genre(s)	Developer(s)	Publisher(s)	Release date			Addons	Ref.
Title	Genre(s)	Developer(s)	Publisher(s)	JP	NA	PAL	Addons	Ref.
#Funtime	Twin-stick shooter	One Guy Games	The Quantum Astrophysicists Guild	Jul 15, 2020	Jul 15, 2020	Jul 15, 2020		
#killallzombies	Shooter	Beatshapers	Digerati	Aug 9, 2016	Oct 27, 2018	Aug 9, 2016		
#SinucaAttack	Platform, puzzle	EastAsiaSoft	EastAsiaSoft	Feb 9, 2021	Feb 9, 2021	Feb 9, 2021		
#Wargames	Interactive movie	Eko (Interlude)	Eko	Unreleased	Jul 31, 2018	Jul 31, 2018	PA	
'n Verlore Verstand	Horror	Skobbejak Games	Skobbejak Games	Unreleased	Apr 21, 2017	Apr 21, 2017		
0 Degrees	Platformer, puzzle	Eastasiasoft, Nerd Games, Kiddo Dev	Eastasiasoft	May 18, 2021	May 18, 2021	May 18, 2021		
10 Second Ninja X	Platform	Four Circle Interactive	Curve Digital	Unreleased	Jul 19, 2016	Jul 19, 2016		
101 Ways to Die	Platform; puzzle	Four Door Lemon; On The Metal	Vision Games Publishing	Unreleased	Mar 18, 2016	Mar 18, 2016		
11-11: Memories Retold	Adventure	Aardman; DigixArt	Bandai Namco Entertainment	Nov 9, 2018	Nov 9, 2018	Nov 9, 2018		
112 Operator	Simulation	Jutsu Games	Ultimate Games	Aug 30, 2024	Aug 30, 2024	Aug 30, 2024		
112th Seed	Platformer, puzzle, action	Eastasiasoft, Nerd Games, Slider Games	Eastasiasoft	Jul 28, 2020	Jul 28, 2020	Jul 28, 2020		
140	Platform	Jeppe Carlsen	Abstraction Games; Double Fine Productions	Unreleased	Aug 30, 2016	Aug 30, 2016		
1001 Spikes	Platform	Nicalis	Nicalis	Nov 27, 2015	Jun 3, 2014	Jun 3, 2014		
20XX	Roguelike; action; platformer	Batterystaple Games	Batterystaple Games; Firehose Games	Jul 11, 2018	Jul 11, 2018	Jul 11, 2018		
2064: Read Only Memories	Graphic adventure	MidBoss	MidBoss	Nov 22, 2017	Jan 17, 2017	Jan 17, 2017		
2Dark	Horror; stealth	Gloomywood	Bigben Interactive	Unreleased	Mar 10, 2017	Mar 10, 2017		
2urvive	Top-down shooter	2bad Games	2bad Games	Jun 12, 2019	Jun 12, 2019	Jun 12, 2019		
39 Days to Mars	Adventure	It's Anecdotal	It's Anecdotal	Unreleased	Feb 6, 2019	Feb 6, 2019		
3D Don't Die Mr. Robot	Action-adventure	Infinite State Games	Eastasiasoft Limited	Mar 11, 2025	Mar 11, 2025	Mar 11, 2025		
3 Minutes to Midnight	Point-and-click adventure	Scarecrow Studio	Scarecrow Studio	Unreleased	TBA	TBA		
41 Hours	First-person shooter	Eastasiasoft	Texelworks; Eastasiasoft	Oct 19, 2022	Oct 19, 2022	Oct 19, 2022		
60 Seconds!	Survival	Robot Gentleman	Robot Gentleman	Unreleased	Mar 6, 2020	Mar 6, 2020		
6180 the moon	Platform	Turtle Cream	Turtle Cream	Unreleased	Dec 11, 2015	Dec 11, 2015		
7 Days to Die	Survival horror	The Fun Pimps; Iron Galaxy	Telltale Publishing	Unreleased	Jun 28, 2016	Jul 1, 2016		
7th Sector	Action-adventure	Noskov Sergey	Sometimes You	Feb 5, 2020	Feb 5, 2020	Feb 5, 2020		
8Days	Shooter	Santa Clara Games	BadLand Games	Unreleased	Feb 6, 2017	Feb 6, 2017		
8-bit Adventure Anthology: Volume I	Point-and-click adventure	Abstraction Games	Abstraction Games	Unreleased	Oct 31, 2017	Oct 31, 2017		
8 to Glory	Sports	Three Gates	Three Gates	Jul 31, 2018	Jul 31, 2018	Sep 14, 2018		
8-Bit Armies	Real-time strategy	Petroglyph Games	Soedesco	Sep 21, 2018	Sep 21, 2018	Sep 21, 2018		
8-Bit Hordes	Real-time strategy	Petroglyph Games	Soedesco	Feb 1, 2019	Feb 1, 2019	Feb 1, 2019		
8-Bit Invaders	Real-time strategy	Petroglyph Games	Soedesco	Feb 26, 2019	Feb 26, 2019	Feb 26, 2019		
88 Heroes	Platform	Bitmap Bureau	Rising Star Games	Unreleased	Mar 24, 2017	Mar 24, 2017		
9 Monkeys of Shaolin	Beat 'em up	Sobaka Studio	JP: Teyon; WW: Buka Entertainment	Oct 16, 2020	Oct 16, 2020	Oct 16, 2020		
911 Operator	Simulation	Jutsu Games	Code Horizon	Unreleased	Nov 8, 2017	Nov 8, 2017		
99Vidas	Brawler	QUByte Interactive	QUByte Interactive	Unreleased	Nov 2, 2017	Nov 2, 2017		
Aaero	Shooter	Mad Fellows Games	Reverb Triple XP	Apr 11, 2017	Apr 11, 2017	Apr 11, 2017	X	
Aaru's Awakening	Platform	Lumenox Games	Lumenox Games	Unreleased	Apr 22, 2015	Apr 22, 2015		
Abo Khashem	Role-playing	Moving Dimensions	Moving Dimensions	Unreleased	Feb 23, 2018	Feb 23, 2018		
Absolute Drift: Zen Edition	Racing	Funselektor Labs	Flippfly	Unreleased	Aug 25, 2017	Aug 25, 2017		
Absolver	Action	Sloclap	Devolver Digital	Unreleased	Jan 7, 2019	Jan 7, 2019	X	
Abyss: The Wraiths of Eden	Hidden object adventure	Artifex Mundi	Artifex Mundi	Unreleased	Oct 20, 2017	Oct 20, 2017		
Abzû	Adventure; art	Giant Squid	505 Games	Unreleased	Dec 5, 2016	Dec 5, 2016		
ACA Neo Geo: 3 Count Bout	Sports	SNK	Hamster Corporation	Oct 16, 2018	Oct 16, 2018	Oct 16, 2018		
ACA Neo Geo: Aero Fighters 2	Shoot 'em up	Video System	Hamster Corporation	Aug 3, 2017	Aug 3, 2017	Aug 3, 2017		
ACA Neo Geo: Aero Fighters 3	Shoot 'em up	Video System	Hamster Corporation	Mar 15, 2018	Mar 15, 2018	Mar 15, 2018		
ACA Neo Geo: Aggressors of Dark Kombat	Fighting	ADK	Hamster Corporation	Sep 13, 2018	Sep 13, 2018	Sep 13, 2018		
ACA Neo Geo: Alpha Mission II	Shoot 'em up	SNK	Hamster Corporation	Apr 27, 2017	Apr 27, 2017	Apr 27, 2017		
ACA Neo Geo: Art of Fighting	Fighting	SNK	Hamster Corporation	Mar 23, 2017	Mar 23, 2017	Mar 23, 2017		
ACA Neo Geo: Art of Fighting 2	Fighting	SNK	Hamster Corporation	Jun 22, 2017	Jun 22, 2017	Jun 22, 2017		
ACA Neo Geo: Art of Fighting 3	Fighting	SNK	Hamster Corporation	Jul 26, 2018	Jul 26, 2018	Jul 26, 2018		
ACA Neo Geo: Baseball Stars Professional	Sports	SNK	Hamster Corporation	May 17, 2018	May 17, 2018	May 17, 2018		
ACA Neo Geo: Baseball Stars 2	Sports	SNK	Hamster Corporation	Mar 21, 2019	Mar 21, 2019	Mar 21, 2019		
ACA Neo Geo: Big Tournament Golf	Sports	Nazca	Hamster Corporation	Feb 23, 2017	Feb 23, 2017	Feb 23, 2017		
ACA Neo Geo: Blazing Star	Shoot 'em up	Yumekobo	Hamster Corporation	Feb 8, 2018	Feb 8, 2018	Feb 8, 2018		
ACA Neo Geo: Blue's Journey	Platform	Alpha Denshi	Hamster Corporation	Sep 7, 2017	Sep 7, 2017	Sep 7, 2017		
ACA Neo Geo: Burning Fight	Beat 'em up	SNK	Hamster Corporation	Sep 28, 2017	Sep 28, 2017	Sep 28, 2017		
ACA Neo Geo: Crossed Swords	Action role-playing	Alpha Denshi	Hamster Corporation	Aug 23, 2018	Aug 23, 2018	Aug 23, 2018		
ACA Neo Geo: Fatal Fury	Fighting	SNK	Hamster Corporation	Mar 23, 2017	Mar 23, 2017	Mar 23, 2017		
ACA Neo Geo: Fatal Fury 2	Fighting	SNK	Hamster Corporation	Apr 20, 2017	Apr 20, 2017	Apr 20, 2017		
ACA Neo Geo: Fatal Fury Special	Fighting	SNK	Hamster Corporation	Jul 13, 2017	Jul 13, 2017	Jul 13, 2017		
ACA Neo Geo: Fatal Fury 3	Fighting	SNK	Hamster Corporation	Aug 31, 2017	Aug 31, 2017	Aug 31, 2017		
ACA Neo Geo: Football Frenzy	Sports	SNK	Hamster Corporation	Aug 30, 2018	Aug 30, 2018	Aug 30, 2018		
ACA Neo Geo: Galaxy Fight: Universal Warriors	Fighting	Sunsoft	Hamster Corporation	Apr 6, 2017	Apr 6, 2017	Apr 6, 2017		
ACA Neo Geo: Garou: Mark of the Wolves	Fighting	SNK	Hamster Corporation	Aug 16, 2018	Aug 16, 2018	Aug 16, 2018		
ACA Neo Geo: Ghost Pilots	Shoot 'em up	SNK	Hamster Corporation	Apr 26, 2018	Apr 26, 2018	Apr 16, 2018		
ACA Neo Geo: Gururin	Puzzle	Face	Hamster Corporation	Apr 12, 2018	Apr 12, 2018	Apr 12, 2018		
ACA Neo Geo: Karnov's Revenge	Fighting	Data East	Hamster Corporation	Apr 12, 2018	Apr 12, 2018	Apr 12, 2018		
ACA Neo Geo: The King of Fighters '94	Fighting	SNK	Hamster Corporation	Mar 9, 2017	Mar 9, 2017	Mar 9, 2017		
ACA Neo Geo: The King of Fighters '95	Fighting	SNK	Hamster Corporation	Mar 30, 2017	Mar 30, 2017	Mar 30, 2017		
ACA Neo Geo: The King of Fighters '96	Fighting	SNK	Hamster Corporation	Aug 10, 2017	Aug 10, 2017	Aug 10, 2017		
ACA Neo Geo: The King of Fighters '97	Fighting	SNK	Hamster Corporation	Nov 2, 2017	Nov 2, 2017	Nov 2, 2017		
ACA Neo Geo: The King of Fighters '98	Fighting	SNK	Hamster Corporation	Jan 11, 2018	Jan 11, 2018	Jan 11, 2018		
ACA Neo Geo: The King of Fighters '99	Fighting	SNK	Hamster Corporation	Apr 5, 2018	Apr 5, 2018	Apr 5, 2018		
ACA Neo Geo: The King of Fighters 2000	Fighting	SNK	Hamster Corporation	Jun 21, 2018	Jun 21, 2018	Jun 21, 2018		
ACA Neo Geo: The King of Fighters 2001	Fighting	Playmore	Hamster Corporation	Sep 27, 2018	Sep 27, 2018	Sep 27, 2018		
ACA Neo Geo: The King of Fighters 2002	Fighting	Playmore	Hamster Corporation	Dec 27, 2018	Dec 27, 2018	Dec 27, 2018		
ACA Neo Geo: The King of Fighters 2003	Fighting	SNK Playmore	Hamster Corporation	Feb 21, 2019	Feb 21, 2019	Feb 21, 2019		
ACA Neo Geo: King of the Monsters	Fighting	SNK	Hamster Corporation	Jun 8, 2017	Jun 8, 2017	Jun 8, 2017		
ACA Neo Geo: King of the Monsters 2	Fighting	SNK	Hamster Corporation	Nov 22, 2018	Nov 22, 2018	Nov 22, 2018		
ACA Neo Geo: Kizuna Encounter	Fighting	SNK	Hamster Corporation	Jan 10, 2019	Jan 10, 2019	Jan 10, 2019		
ACA Neo Geo: The Last Blade	Fighting	SNK	Hamster Corporation	May 18, 2017	May 18, 2017	May 18, 2017		
ACA Neo Geo: The Last Blade 2	Fighting	SNK	Hamster Corporation	Feb 15, 2018	Feb 15, 2018	Feb 15, 2018		
ACA Neo Geo: Last Resort	Shoot 'em up	SNK	Hamster Corporation	May 2, 2017	May 2, 2017	May 2, 2017		
ACA Neo Geo: League Bowling	Sports	SNK	Hamster Corporation	Jul 19, 2018	Jul 19, 2018	Jul 19, 2018		
ACA Neo Geo: Magical Drop II	Puzzle	Data East	Hamster Corporation	Jun 15, 2017	Jun 15, 2017	Jun 15, 2017		
ACA Neo Geo: Magical Drop III	Puzzle	Data East	Hamster Corporation	Feb 22, 2018	Feb 22, 2018	Feb 22, 2018		
ACA Neo Geo: Magician Lord	Action	Alpha Densei	Hamster Corporation	Aug 17, 2017	Aug 17, 2017	Aug 17, 2017		
ACA Neo Geo: Metal Slug	Shoot 'em up	Nazca Corporation	Hamster Corporation	Mar 2, 2017	Mar 2, 2017	Mar 2, 2017		
ACA Neo Geo: Metal Slug 2	Shoot 'em up	SNK	Hamster Corporation	Jun 1, 2017	Jun 1, 2017	Jun 1, 2017		
ACA Neo Geo: Metal Slug X	Shoot 'em up	SNK	Hamster Corporation	Oct 5, 2017	Oct 5, 2017	Oct 5, 2017		
ACA Neo Geo: Metal Slug 3	Shoot 'em up	SNK	Hamster Corporation	Dec 21, 2017	Dec 21, 2017	Dec 21, 2017		
ACA Neo Geo: Metal Slug 4	Shoot 'em up	SNK	Hamster Corporation	Aug 9, 2018	Aug 9, 2018	Aug 9, 2018		
ACA Neo Geo: Metal Slug 5	Shoot 'em up	SNK Playmore	Hamster Corporation	Dec 13, 2018	Dec 13, 2018	Dec 13, 2018		
ACA Neo Geo: Money Puzzle Exchanger	Puzzle	Face	Hamster Corporation	Jun 28, 2018	Jun 28, 2018	Jun 28, 2018		
ACA Neo Geo: Mutation Nation	Beat 'em up	SNK	Hamster Corporation	Oct 26, 2017	Oct 26, 2017	Oct 26, 2017		
ACA Neo Geo: NAM-1975	Shooter	SNK	Hamster Corporation	Oct 26, 2017	Oct 26, 2017	Oct 26, 2017		
ACA Neo Geo: Neo Geo Cup '98: The Road to the Victory	Sports	SNK	Hamster Corporation	Nov 29, 2018	Nov 29, 2018	Nov 29, 2018		
ACA Neo Geo: Ninja Combat	Beat 'em up	Alpha Densei	Hamster Corporation	May 31, 2018	May 31, 2018	May 31, 2018		
ACA Neo Geo: Ninja Commando	Shoot 'em up	Alpha Densei	Hamster Corporation	Sep 6, 2018	Sep 6, 2018	Sep 6, 2018		
ACA Neo Geo: Ninja Master's	Fighting	ADK	Hamster Corporation	Jan 17, 2019	Jan 17, 2019	Jan 17, 2019		
ACA Neo Geo: Over Top	Racing	ADK	Hamster Corporation	Apr 20, 2017	Apr 20, 2017	Apr 20, 2017		
ACA Neo Geo: Pleasure Goal	Sports	Saurus	Hamster Corporation	Nov 1, 2018	Nov 1, 2018	Nov 1, 2018		
ACA Neo Geo: Power Spikes II	Sports	Video System	Hamster Corporation	Jan 18, 2018	Jan 18, 2018	Jan 18, 2018		
ACA Neo Geo: Prehistoric Isle 2	Shoot 'em up	Yumekobo	Hamster Corporation	Aug 2, 2018	Aug 2, 2018	Aug 2, 2018		
ACA Neo Geo: Pulstar	Shoot 'em up	Aicom	Hamster Corporation	Jul 6, 2017	Jul 6, 2017	Jul 6, 2017		
ACA Neo Geo: Puzzle Bobble	Puzzle	Taito	Hamster Corporation	Dec 20, 2018	Dec 20, 2018	Dec 20, 2018		
ACA Neo Geo: Puzzle Bobble 2	Puzzle	Taito	Hamster Corporation	Feb 7, 2019	Feb 7, 2019	Feb 7, 2019		
ACA Neo Geo: Puzzled	Puzzle	SNK	Hamster Corporation	Aug 24, 2017	Aug 24, 2017	Aug 24, 2017		
ACA Neo Geo: Ragnagard	Fighting	Saurus	Hamster Corporation	Jan 10, 2019	Jan 10, 2019	Jan 10, 2019		
ACA Neo Geo: Real Bout Fatal Fury	Fighting	SNK	Hamster Corporation	Oct 12, 2017	Oct 12, 2017	Oct 12, 2017		
ACA Neo Geo: Real Bout Fatal Fury Special	Fighting	SNK	Hamster Corporation	Dec 14, 2017	Dec 14, 2017	Dec 14, 2017		
ACA Neo Geo: Real Bout Fatal Fury 2: The Newcomers	Fighting	SNK	Hamster Corporation	Mar 8, 2018	Mar 8, 2018	Mar 8, 2018		
ACA Neo Geo: Riding Hero	Racing	SNK	Hamster Corporation	Jun 7, 2018	Jun 7, 2018	Jun 7, 2018		
ACA Neo Geo: Robo Army	Beat 'em up	SNK	Hamster Corporation	Oct 19, 2017	Oct 19, 2017	Oct 19, 2017		
ACA Neo Geo: Samurai Shodown	Fighting	SNK	Hamster Corporation	May 2, 2017	May 2, 2017	May 2, 2017		
ACA Neo Geo: Samurai Shodown II	Fighting	SNK	Hamster Corporation	Sep 21, 2017	Sep 21, 2017	Sep 21, 2017		
ACA Neo Geo: Samurai Shodown III	Fighting	SNK	Hamster Corporation	Feb 1, 2018	Feb 1, 2018	Feb 1, 2018		
ACA Neo Geo: Samurai Shodown IV	Fighting	SNK	Hamster Corporation	Apr 19, 2018	Apr 19, 2018	Apr 19, 2018		
ACA Neo Geo: Samurai Shodown V	Fighting	SNK	Hamster Corporation	Jul 5, 2018	Jul 5, 2018	Jul 5, 2018		
ACA Neo Geo: Samurai Shodown V Special	Fighting	SNK Playmore	Hamster Corporation	Apr 18, 2019	Apr 18, 2019	Apr 18, 2019		
ACA Neo Geo: Savage Reign	Fighting	SNK	Hamster Corporation	Oct 25, 2018	Oct 25, 2018	Oct 25, 2018		
ACA Neo Geo: Sengoku	Beat 'em up	SNK	Hamster Corporation	Mar 16, 2017	Mar 16, 2017	Mar 16, 2017		
ACA Neo Geo: Sengoku 2	Beat 'em up	SNK	Hamster Corporation	Apr 13, 2017	Apr 13, 2017	Apr 13, 2017		
ACA Neo Geo: Sengoku 3	Beat 'em up	SNK	Hamster Corporation	Mar 29, 2018	Mar 29, 2018	Mar 29, 2018		
ACA Neo Geo: Shock Troopers	Shoot 'em up	Saurus	Hamster Corporation	Jan 25, 2018	Jan 25, 2018	Jan 25, 2018		
ACA Neo Geo: Shock Troopers 2nd Squad	Shoot 'em up	Saurus	Hamster Corporation	Mar 1, 2018	Mar 1, 2018	Mar 1, 2018		
ACA Neo Geo: Soccer Brawl	Sports	SNK	Hamster Corporation	Nov 22, 2017	Nov 22, 2017	Nov 22, 2017		
ACA Neo Geo: Spinmaster	Platform	Data East	Hamster Corporation	Sep 14, 2017	Sep 14, 2017	Sep 14, 2017		
ACA Neo Geo: Stakes Winner	Racing	Saurus	Hamster Corporation	May 2, 2018	May 2, 2018	May 2, 2018		
ACA Neo Geo: Stakes Winner 2	Racing	Saurus	Hamster Corporation	Nov 15, 2018	Nov 15, 2018	Nov 15, 2018		
ACA Neo Geo: Street Hoop	Sports	Data East	Hamster Corporation	Nov 9, 2017	Nov 9, 2017	Nov 9, 2017		
ACA Neo Geo: Strikers 1945 Plus	Shoot 'em up	Psikyo	Hamster Corporation	Oct 18, 2018	Oct 18, 2018	Oct 18, 2018		
ACA Neo Geo: Super Baseball 2020	Sports	SNK	Hamster Corporation	Jun 29, 2017	Jun 29, 2017	Jun 29, 2017		
ACA Neo Geo: Super Sidekicks	Sports	SNK	Hamster Corporation	Jul 27, 2017	Jul 27, 2017	Jul 27, 2017		
ACA Neo Geo: Super Sidekicks 2	Sports	SNK	Hamster Corporation	May 10, 2018	May 10, 2018	May 10, 2018		
ACA Neo Geo: Super Sidekicks 3	Sports	SNK	Hamster Corporation	Jun 14, 2018	Jun 14, 2018	Jun 14, 2018		
ACA Neo Geo: The Super Spy	Beat 'em up	SNK	Hamster Corporation	Jul 12, 2018	Jul 12, 2018	Jul 12, 2018		
ACA Neo Geo: Thrash Rally	Racing	Alpha Denshi	Hamster Corporation	Nov 8, 2018	Nov 8, 2018	Nov 8, 2018		
ACA Neo Geo: Top Hunter: Roddy & Cathy	Action	SNK	Hamster Corporation	Dec 7, 2017	Dec 7, 2017	Dec 7, 2017		
ACA Neo Geo: Top Player's Golf	Sports	SNK	Hamster Corporation	May 24, 2018	May 24, 2018	May 24, 2018		
ACA Neo Geo: Twinkle Star Sprites	Shoot 'em up	ADK	Hamster Corporation	Dec 6, 2018	Dec 6, 2018	Dec 6, 2018		
ACA Neo Geo: The Ultimate 11: SNK Football Championship	Sports	SNK	Hamster Corporation	Feb 28, 2019	Feb 28, 2019	Feb 28, 2019		
ACA Neo Geo: Waku Waku 7	Fighting	Sunsoft	Hamster Corporation	Mar 22, 2018	Mar 22, 2018	Mar 22, 2018		
ACA Neo Geo: World Heroes	Fighting	Alpha Denshi	Hamster Corporation	Feb 23, 2017	Feb 23, 2017	Feb 23, 2017		
ACA Neo Geo: World Heroes 2	Fighting	ADK	Hamster Corporation	May 25, 2017	May 25, 2017	May 25, 2017		
ACA Neo Geo: World Heroes 2 Jet	Fighting	ADK	Hamster Corporation	Nov 30, 2017	Nov 30, 2017	Nov 30, 2017		
ACA Neo Geo: World Heroes Perfect	Fighting	ADK	Hamster Corporation	Jan 31, 2019	Jan 31, 2019	Jan 31, 2019		
ACA Neo Geo: Zed Blade	Shoot 'em up	NMK	Hamster Corporation	Jul 20, 2017	Jul 20, 2017	Jul 20, 2017		
ACA Neo Geo: ZuPaPa!	Platform	SNK	Hamster Corporation	Oct 4, 2018	Oct 4, 2018	Oct 4, 2018		
Access Denied	Puzzle	Stately Snail	Ratalaika Games	Feb 6, 2019	Feb 6, 2019	Feb 6, 2019		
Accolade Sports Collection	Sports	QUByte Interactive	QUByte Interactive; Atari	Jan 30, 2025	Jan 30, 2025	Jan 30, 2025		
Ace Attorney Investigations Collection	Visual novel; Adventure	Capcom	Capcom	Sep 6, 2024	Sep 6, 2024	Sep 6, 2024		
Ace Combat 7: Skies Unknown	Flight simulator	Project Aces	Bandai Namco Entertainment	Jan 18, 2019	Jan 18, 2019	Jan 18, 2019		
Aces of the Luftwaffe: Squadron	Shoot 'em up	HandyGames	HandyGames	Unreleased	Jul 24, 2018	Jul 24, 2018		
Achilles: Legends Untold	Action role-playing	Dark Point Games	Dark Point Games	Sep 18, 2024	Sep 18, 2024	Sep 18, 2024		
Achtung! Cthulhu Tactics	Turn-based strategy	Auroch Digital	Ripstone	Unreleased	Nov 23, 2018	Nov 23, 2018	X	
Acorn Assault: Rodent Revolution	Turn-based strategy	High Tale Studios	Black Shell Media	Unreleased	Jan 11, 2017	Jan 11, 2017		
Action Henk	Platform	RageSquid	Curve Digital	Unreleased	May 4, 2016	May 4, 2016		
Action News Heroes	Shoot 'em up	Krewe Studios	Krewe Studios	Unreleased	Jul 27, 2016	Jul 27, 2016		
Active Soccer 2 DX	Sports	The Fox Software	The Fox Software	Unreleased	Mar 30, 2016	Mar 30, 2016		
Active Soccer 2019	Sports	The Fox Software	The Fox Software	Unreleased	Oct 11, 2019	Oct 11, 2019		
Adam's Venture: Origins	Adventure	Soedesco	Soedesco	Apr 1, 2016	Apr 1, 2016	Apr 1, 2016		
Adios Amigos	Action-adventure	Cosmic Picnic	Cosmic Picnic	Unreleased	Sep 12, 2018	Sep 12, 2018	X	
The Adventures of 00 Dilly	Physics puzzler	Caipirinha Games	Toplitz Productions	Feb 12, 2020	Feb 12, 2020	Feb 12, 2020		
Adventures of Bertram Fiddle Ep 1: A Dreadly Business	Adventure	Rumpus Animation	Chorus Worldwide	May 7, 2019	May 8, 2019	May 7, 2019		
The Adventures of Elena Temple	Platformer, Retro	Grimtalin	Grimtalin	Unreleased	Sep 27, 2019	Sep 27, 2019		
Adventures of Pip	Platform	TicToc Games	TicToc Games	Unreleased	Aug 21, 2015	Aug 21, 2015		
The Adventure Pals	Platform; role-playing	Massive Monster	Armor Games	Unreleased	Apr 3, 2018	Apr 3, 2018		
Adventure Time: Finn & Jake Investigations	Action-adventure	Vicious Cycle Software	Little Orbit	Unreleased	Oct 20, 2015	Nov 6, 2015		
Adventure Time: Pirates of the Enchiridion	Action-adventure	Climax Studios	Outright Games	Unreleased	Jul 17, 2018	Jul 17, 2018		
Aeon Must Die!	Beat 'em up	Limestone Games	Focus Home Interactive	Oct 14, 2021	Oct 14, 2021	Oct 14, 2021		
AER: Memories of Old	Adventure	Forgotten Key	Daedalic Entertainment	Unreleased	Oct 25, 2017	Oct 25, 2017		
AereA	Action role-playing; music	Triangle Studios	Soedesco	Unreleased	Jun 30, 2017	Jun 30, 2017		
Aery: Little Bird Adventure	Casual, action	Epixr	Epixr	Dec 20, 2019	Dec 20, 2019	Dec 20, 2019	X	
Aeterna Noctis	Metroidvania	Aeternum Game Studios	Aeternum Game Studios	Unreleased	Dec 15, 2021	Dec 15, 2021		
AeternoBlade	Action-adventure	Corecell Technology	Corecell Technology	Unreleased	Aug 30, 2017	Aug 30, 2017		
AeternoBlade II	Action-adventure	Corecell Technology	Corecell Technology	Unreleased	Oct 11, 2019	Oct 11, 2019		
AEW Fight Forever	Sports	Yuke's	THQ Nordic	Jun 29, 2023	Jun 29, 2023	Jun 29, 2023		
AFL 23	Sports	Big Ant Studios	Nacon	Sep 22, 2023	Sep 22, 2023	Sep 22, 2023		
AFL Evolution	Sports	Wicked Witch Software	Tru Blu Entertainment	Unreleased	May 5, 2017	May 5, 2017		
AFL Evolution 2	Sports	Wicked Witch Software	Tru Blu Entertainment	Apr 9, 2020	Apr 9, 2020	Apr 9, 2020		
Aftercharge	Asymmetrical multiplayer shooter	Chainsawesome Games	Chainsawesome Games	Jan 10, 2019	Jan 10, 2019	Jan 10, 2019		
Afterparty	Adventure	Night School Studio	Night School Studio	Oct 28, 2019	Oct 29, 2019	Oct 29, 2019		
Agatha Christie – Hercule Poirot: The First Cases	Point-and-click adventure	Blazing Griffin	Microïds	Unreleased	Sep 28, 2021	Sep 28, 2021		
Agatha Christie: The ABC Murders	Point-and-click adventure	Artefacts Studio	Microïds	Unreleased	Feb 23, 2016	Feb 4, 2016		
Agatha Knife	Adventure	Mango Protocol	Mango Protocol	Unreleased	Apr 27, 2018	Apr 27, 2018		
Age of Wonders: Planetfall	Strategy; 4X	Triumph Studios	Paradox Interactive	Unreleased	Aug 6, 2019	Aug 6, 2019	X	
Agent A: A Puzzle in Disguise	Adventure	Yak	Yak	Aug 29, 2019	Aug 29, 2019	Aug 29, 2019	X	
Agents of Mayhem	Open world; action	Volition	Deep Silver	Unreleased	Aug 15, 2017	Aug 18, 2017	X	
Agents vs Villain	Party	Process	Process	Unreleased	Nov 7, 2018	Nov 7, 2018		
Ages of Mages: The Last Keeper	Roguelike; action role-playing	YFC Games	YFC Games	Feb 6, 2019	Feb 6, 2019	Feb 6, 2019		
Aggelos	Retro action-adventure, metroidvania	Look At My Game	PQube	Jul 11, 2019	Jul 12, 2019	Jul 11, 2019		
Aground	Adventure	Fancy Fish Games, SnöBox Studio	Whitethorn Games	Feb 11, 2021	Feb 11, 2021	Feb 11, 2021		
Ailment	Top-down shooter	BeardyBird Games	Epixr Games	Feb 21, 2020	Feb 21, 2020	Feb 21, 2020	X	
AI: The Somnium Files	Adventure, Visual novel	Spike Chunsoft	Spike Chunsoft	Sep 30, 2021	Sep 30, 2021	Sep 30, 2021		
AIPD	Twin-stick shooter	Blazing Badger	Blazing Badger	Unreleased	Jan 29, 2016	Jan 29, 2016		
Air Guitar Warrior	Music; shooter	Virtual Air Guitar Company	Virtual Air Guitar Company	Unreleased	Mar 29, 2017	Mar 29, 2017	K	
Air Missions: Hind	Simulation	3Division Entertainment	3Division Entertainment	Unreleased	Jun 14, 2017	Jun 14, 2017		
Airheart: Tales of Broken Wings	Shooter	Blindflug Studios	Blindflug Studios	Unreleased	Aug 14, 2018	Aug 14, 2018	X	
Akuatica: Turtle Racing	Racing	Tianyu Studio Software	Tianyu Studio Software	Unreleased	Nov 17, 2017	Nov 17, 2017		
Alaloth: Champions of The Four Kingdoms	Action; role-playing	Gamera Interactive	Gamera Interactive	Unreleased	Nov 21, 2024	Nov 21, 2024		
Alan Wake Remastered	Action-adventure	Remedy Entertainment	Epic Games Publishing	Oct 5, 2021	Oct 5, 2021	Oct 5, 2021		
Alba: A Wildlife Adventure	Adventure	Ustwo	Ustwo	Unreleased	Jun 9, 2021	Jun 9, 2021		
Albedo: Eyes from Outer Space	Adventure	Z4G0	Merge Games	Unreleased	Jan 20, 2016	Jan 20, 2016		
Albert and Otto	Puzzle; platformer	K Bros Games	Digerati	Unreleased	Jan 9, 2018	Jan 9, 2018		
Alekhine's Gun	Action; stealth	Haggard Games	Maximum Games	Unreleased	May 1, 2016	May 25, 2016		
Alex Kidd in Miracle World DX	Platform	Jankenteam	Merge Games	Unreleased	Jun 24, 2021	Jun 24, 2021		
Alien: Isolation	Action-adventure; survival horror; stealth	The Creative Assembly	Sega	Jun 11, 2015	Oct 7, 2014	Oct 7, 2014		
Alien Cruise	Shoot 'em up	Cotton Games	E-Home Entertainment	Mar 27, 2019	Mar 27, 2019	Mar 27, 2019	X	
All-Star Fruit Racing	Kart racing	3D Clouds	PQube	Unreleased	Aug 21, 2018	Aug 21, 2018		
Alluris	Role-playing	562 Studios	562 Studios	Oct 11, 2019	Oct 11, 2019	Oct 11, 2019	X	
Almost There: The Platformer	Platformer	The Quantum Astrophysicists Guild	The Quantum Astrophysicists Guild	Feb 19, 2019	Feb 19, 2019	Feb 19, 2019		
Alteric	Platformer	Sometimes You	Sometimes You	Dec 7, 2018	Mar 30, 2018	Mar 29, 2018		
Alvastia Chronicles	Japanese role-playing	Exe Create	Kemco	Jan 18, 2019	Jan 18, 2019	Jan 18, 2019	PA	
Alwa's Awakening	Action-adventure; metroidvania	Elden Pixels	Elden Pixels	Nov 5, 2019	Nov 5, 2019	Nov 5, 2019		
The Amazing American Circus	Business simulation	Juggler Games	Klabater	Unreleased	May 20, 2021	May 20, 2021		
Amazing Princess Sarah	Platform-adventure	Haruneko	Haruneko	Unreleased	Jan 29, 2016	Jan 29, 2016		
The Amazing Spider-Man 2	Action-adventure	Beenox	Activision	Unreleased	Apr 29, 2014	May 16, 2014		
American Fugitive	Open world; action-adventure	Fallen Tree Games	Curve Digital	May 23, 2019	May 24, 2019	May 23, 2019		
American Ninja Warrior: Challenge	Action	Gaming Corps	GameMill Entertainment	Unreleased	Mar 19, 2019	Unreleased		
Amnesia: The Dark Descent	Horror; stealth	Frictional Games	Frictional Games	Unreleased	Sep 28, 2018	Sep 28, 2018		
Amoeba Battle: Microscopic RTS Action	Strategy; real-time strategy	Grab Games	Grab Games	Mar 3, 2020	Mar 3, 2020	Mar 3, 2020		
Among the Sleep	Survival horror	Krillbite Studio	Krillbite Studio	Unreleased	Jun 3, 2016	Jun 3, 2016		
Among Us	Social deduction	Innersloth	Innersloth	Unreleased	Dec 14, 2021	Dec 14, 2021		
Anamorphine	Adventure	Artifact 5	Artifact 5	Unreleased	TBA	TBA		
Anarcute	Action; adventure	AnarTeam	AnarTeam	Unreleased	Jul 12, 2016	Jul 12, 2016		
Ancestors: The Humankind Odyssey	Survival	Panache Digital Games	Private Division	Dec 6, 2019	Dec 6, 2019	Dec 6, 2019		
Ancestors Legacy	Real-time strategy	Destructive Creations	1C Company	Jul 1, 2019	Aug 13, 2019	Aug 13, 2019		
AngerForce Reloaded	Shoot 'em up	E-Home Entertainment	E-Home Entertainment	Apr 2, 2019	Apr 2, 2019	Apr 2, 2019		
Angry Birds Star Wars	Puzzle; strategy	Rovio Entertainment; Exient Entertainment	Activision	Unreleased	Nov 22, 2013	Nov 22, 2013		
The Angry Video Game Nerd I & II Deluxe	Platform	FreakZone Games	Screenwave Media	Unreleased	Oct 29, 2020	Oct 29, 2020		
Anima: Gate of Memories	Action role-playing	Anima Project	Badland Games	Unreleased	Jun 3, 2016	Jun 3, 2016		
Animal Super Squad	Platform; racing	Doublemoose Games	Digerati	Unreleased	Feb 1, 2019	Feb 1, 2019		
Animus: Stand Alone	Action role-playing	Tenbirds	Tenbirds	Aug 7, 2019	Aug 7, 2019	Aug 7, 2019	PA	
Ankora: Lost Days	Adventure; survival	Chibig	Chibig	Mar 30, 2023	Mar 30, 2023	Mar 30, 2023		
Anode	Puzzle	Kittehface Software	Kittehface Software	Unreleased	Aug 10, 2016	Unreleased		
Anodyne	Action-adventure	Epiphany Games; Analgesic Productions	Nnooo	Unreleased	Sep 21, 2018	Sep 21, 2018		
Anodyne 2: Return to Dust	Action-adventure	Analgesic Productions	Ratalaika Games	Unreleased	Feb 18, 2021	Feb 18, 2021		
Another Sight	Action-adventure	Lunar Great Wall Studios	Toplitz Productions	Jun 18, 2019	Jun 18, 2019	Jun 18, 2019	X	
Another World: 20th Anniversary Edition	Action-adventure	Martial Hesse-Dreville	The Digital Lounge	Unreleased	Jun 25, 2014	Jun 25, 2014		
Anoxemia	Adventure; puzzle	BSK Group	BadLand Games	Unreleased	Mar 28, 2017	Mar 28, 2017		
Anthem	Action role-playing	BioWare	Electronic Arts	Feb 22, 2019	Feb 22, 2019	Feb 22, 2019	X	
Antigraviator	Racing	Cybernetic Walrus	Iceberg Interactive	May 1, 2020	Jun 6, 2018	Jun 6, 2018		
Antiquia Lost	Japanese role-playing	Exe Create	Kemco	Jun 19, 2019	Jun 19, 2019	Jun 19, 2019		
AO Tennis	Sports	Big Ant Studios	Big Ant Studios	Unreleased	Apr 30, 2018	Apr 30, 2018	X	
AO Tennis 2	Sports	Big Ant Studios	Bigben Interactive	Unreleased	Feb 11, 2020	Jan 9, 2020	X	
Apocalipsis	Point & click adventure	Punch Punk Games	Klabater	Unreleased	Sep 6, 2019	Sep 6, 2019		
Apollo Justice: Ace Attorney Trilogy	Adventure; visual novel	Capcom	Capcom	Jan 25, 2024	Jan 25, 2024	Jan 25, 2024		
Aqua Kitty UDX: Xbox One Ultra Edition	Action-adventure; shooter	Tikipod	Tikipod	Unreleased	Feb 2, 2017	Feb 2, 2017		
Aqua Moto Racing Utopia	Racing	Zordix	Zordix	Unreleased	May 4, 2018	May 4, 2018		
AquaNox: Deep Descent	Shooter	Digital Arrow	THQ Nordic	Unreleased	TBA	TBA		
The Aquatic Adventure of the Last Human	Metroidvania	YCJY; Stage Clear Studios	Digerati	Unreleased	Jan 19, 2018	Jan 19, 2018		
Ara Fell: Enhanced Edition	Japanese role-playing	Stegosoft	Dangen Entertainment	Mar 26, 2020	Mar 26, 2020	Mar 26, 2020		
Aragami: Shadow Edition	Action-adventure; stealth	Lince Works	Lince Works	Unreleased	Jun 5, 2018	Jun 5, 2018		
Aragami 2	Action-adventure; stealth	Lince Works	Lince Works	Sep 17, 2021	Sep 17, 2021	Sep 17, 2021		
Arcade Classics Anniversary Collection	Arcade; shoot 'em up	Konami	Konami	Apr 18, 2019	Apr 18, 2019	Apr 18, 2019		
Arcade Islands: Volume One	Party	Teyon	Mastiff	Unreleased	Sep 4, 2018	Sep 4, 2018		
Arietta of Spirits	Action-adventure	Third Spirits	Red Art Games	Unreleased	Aug 20, 2021	Aug 20, 2021		
Arise: A Simple Story	Action-adventure	Piccolo Studios	Techland	Dec 3, 2019	Dec 3, 2019	Dec 3, 2019		
Aritana & the Harpy's Feather	Platform	Duaik	Duaik	Unreleased	Sep 9, 2015	Unreleased		
Aritana & the Twin Masks	Action-adventure	Duaik	Duaik	Aug 16, 2019	Aug 16, 2019	Aug 16, 2019		
Ark: Survival Evolved	Survival	Studio Wildcard	Studio Wildcard	Aug 29, 2017	Aug 29, 2017	Aug 29, 2017	PA PC X	
Armello	Role-playing; board game	League of Geeks	League of Geeks	Unreleased	Aug 30, 2016	Aug 30, 2016		
Armikrog	Action-adventure	Pencil Test Studios	Versus Evil	Unreleased	Aug 22, 2016	Aug 22, 2016		
Armored Freedom	Strategy; board game	Killer Bees Games	Killer Bees Games	Unreleased	Oct 5, 2018	Oct 5, 2018		
Arrest of a Stone Buddha	Shooter	Yeo	Yeo	Unreleased	May 14, 2021	May 14, 2021		
Arslan: The Warriors of Legend	Action	Koei Tecmo	Koei Tecmo	Unreleased	Feb 9, 2016	Feb 9, 2016		
The Artful Escape	Adventure	Beethoven and Dinosaur	Annapurna Interactive	Unreleased	Sep 9, 2021	Sep 9, 2021		
Art of Rally	Racing	Funselektor Labs	Funselektor Labs	Aug 12, 2021	Aug 12, 2021	Aug 12, 2021		
Ary and the Secret of Seasons	Adventure	eXiin	Modus Games	Unreleased	Sep 1, 2020	Sep 1, 2020		
Ascendance: First Horizon	3D Platformer	Onevision	Onevision	May 10, 2019	May 10, 2019	May 10, 2019	X	
The Ascent	Action role-playing	Neon Giant	Curve Digital	Jul 29, 2021	Jul 29, 2021	Jul 29, 2021		
Asdivine Dios	Japanese role-playing	Exe Create	Kemco	Jun 5, 2019	Jun 5, 2019	Jun 5, 2019		
Asdivine Hearts	Japanese role-playing	Exe Create	Kemco	Jul 6, 2018	Jul 6, 2018	Jul 6, 2018	PA	
Asdivine Hearts II	Japanese role-playing	Exe Create	Kemco	Dec 21, 2018	Dec 21, 2018	Dec 21, 2018	PA	
Asdivine Kamura	Japanese role-playing	Exe Create	Kemco	Oct 2, 2019	Oct 2, 2019	Oct 2, 2019		
Asdivine Menace	Japanese role-playing	Exe Create	Kemco	Aug 2, 2019	Aug 2, 2019	Aug 2, 2019	PA	
Asemblance	Adventure	Nilo Studios	Nilo Studios	Unreleased	Jan 30, 2018	Jan 30, 2018		
Asemblance: Oversight	Adventure	Nilo Studios	Nilo Studios	Unreleased	Aug 3, 2018	Aug 3, 2018		
Ash of Gods: Redemption	Tactical role-playing	Aurum Dust	Ravenscourt	Unreleased	Jan 31, 2020	Jan 30, 2020		
Ashen	Action role-playing	A44	Annapurna Interactive	Apr 30, 2020	Dec 7, 2018	Dec 7, 2018		
Ashes Cricket	Sports	Big Ant Studios	Big Ant Studios	Unreleased	Nov 16, 2017	Nov 16, 2017	X	
Aspire: Ina's Tale	Action-adventure	Wondernaut Studio	Untold Tales	Unreleased	Dec 17, 2021	Dec 17, 2021		
Assassin's Creed III: Remastered	Action-adventure; stealth	Ubisoft	Ubisoft	Mar 29, 2019	Mar 29, 2019	Mar 29, 2019	X	
Assassin's Creed IV: Black Flag	Action-adventure; open world; stealth	Ubisoft Montreal	Ubisoft	Sep 4, 2014	Nov 22, 2013	Nov 22, 2013		
Assassin's Creed Chronicles: China	Action-adventure	Climax Studios	Ubisoft	Apr 20, 2015	Apr 20, 2015	Apr 20, 2015		
Assassin's Creed Chronicles: India	Action-adventure	Climax Studios	Ubisoft	Feb 8, 2016	Feb 8, 2016	Feb 8, 2016		
Assassin's Creed Chronicles: Russia	Action; stealth	Climax Studios	Ubisoft	Jan 11, 2016	Jan 11, 2016	Jan 11, 2016		
Assassin's Creed: Odyssey	Action-adventure	Ubisoft Quebec	Ubisoft	Oct 5, 2018	Oct 5, 2018	Oct 5, 2018	X	
Assassin's Creed: Origins	Action-adventure	Ubisoft	Ubisoft	Oct 27, 2017	Oct 27, 2017	Oct 27, 2017	X	
Assassin's Creed: Rogue Remastered	Action-adventure	Ubisoft Sofia	Ubisoft	Mar 20, 2018	Mar 20, 2018	Mar 20, 2018		
Assassin's Creed: Syndicate	Action-adventure; open world	Ubisoft Quebec	Ubisoft	Nov 12, 2015	Oct 23, 2015	Oct 23, 2015		
Assassin's Creed: The Ezio Collection	Action-adventure; open world	Virtuos	Ubisoft	Nov 14, 2016	Nov 14, 2016	Nov 14, 2016		
Assassin's Creed: Unity	Action-adventure; open world; stealth	Ubisoft Toronto	Ubisoft	Nov 20, 2014	Nov 11, 2014	Nov 14, 2014		
Assassin's Creed Valhalla	Action role-playing	Ubisoft Montreal	Ubisoft	Nov 10, 2020	Nov 10, 2020	Nov 10, 2020		
The Assembly	Adventure	nDreams	nDreams	Unreleased	Jan 20, 2017	Jan 20, 2017		
Assetto Corsa	Racing	Kunos Simulazioni	505 Games	Unreleased	Aug 30, 2016	Aug 26, 2016		
Astalon: Tears of the Earth	Action; platform	LABSworks	Dangen Entertainment	Unreleased	Jun 3, 2021	Jun 3, 2021		
Asterix & Obelix: Slap Them All!	Beat 'em up	Mr. Nutz Studio	Microids	Unreleased	Nov 25, 2021	Nov 25, 2021		
Asterix & Obelix XXL 2: Mission: Las Vegum	Platform	OSome Studios	Microids	Unreleased	Nov 29, 2018	Nov 29, 2018		
Asterix & Obelix XXL 3: The Crystal Menhir	Platform	Anuman Interactive	Microids	Unreleased	Oct 2, 2019	Nov 21, 2019		
Astria Ascending	Role-playing	Artisan Studios	Dear Villagers	Sep 30, 2021	Sep 30, 2021	Sep 30, 2021		
Astroneer	Simulation, Survival	System Era Softworks	System Era Softworks	Feb 6, 2019	Feb 6, 2019	Feb 6, 2019	PA PC X	
At Sundown: Shots in the Dark	Competitive stealth arena shooter	Mild Beast Games	Versus Evil	Unreleased	Jan 22, 2019	Jan 22, 2019		
Atari Flashback Classics: Volume 1	Arcade	Code Mystics	Atari	Unreleased	Nov 1, 2016	Nov 1, 2016		
Atari Flashback Classics: Volume 2	Arcade	Code Mystics	Atari	Unreleased	Nov 1, 2016	Nov 1, 2016		
Atari Flashback Classics: Volume 3	Arcade	Code Mystics	Atari	Unreleased	Oct 11, 2018	Oct 11, 2018		
Atlas	MMO	Grapeshot Games	Grapeshot Games	Unreleased	TBA	Unreleased		
Atomfall	Action; Survival	Rebellion Developments	Rebellion Developments	Mar 27, 2025	Mar 27, 2025	Mar 27, 2025		
Atomic Heist	Shooter	Live Aliens	Live Aliens	Unreleased	Apr 20, 2018	Apr 20, 2018		
Atomicrops	Roguelike top-down shooter	Bird Bath Games	Raw Fury	May 28, 2020	May 28, 2020	May 28, 2020		
Attack Heroes	Action	Ejoy Games	Tencent	Jan 1, 2017	Unreleased	Unreleased		
Attack of the Earthlings	Strategy; stealth	Team Junkfish	Wales Interactive	Mar 5, 2019	Mar 5, 2019	Mar 5, 2019		
Attack of the Toy Tanks	Shooter	Petite Games	Ratalaika Games	Jun 26, 2019	Jun 26, 2019	Jun 26, 2019		
Attack on Titan	Action	Omega Force	Koei Tecmo	Feb 18, 2016	Aug 30, 2016	Aug 26, 2016		
Attack on Titan 2	Action	Omega Force	Koei Tecmo	Mar 15, 2018	Mar 20, 2018	Mar 20, 2018		
ATV Drift & Tricks: Definitive Edition	Racing	Artefacts Studio	Microïds	Unreleased	Nov 20, 2018	Nov 20, 2018		
ATV Renegades	Racing	Nighthawk Interactive	Nighthawk Interactive	Unreleased	Apr 18, 2017	Apr 18, 2017		
Aven Colony	Simulation	Mothership Entertainment	Team17	Unreleased	Jul 25, 2017	Jul 25, 2017		
Marvel's Avengers	Action-adventure	Crystal Dynamics; Eidos Montréal	Square Enix	Sep 4, 2020	Sep 4, 2020	Sep 4, 2020		
AVICII Invector	Music	Hello There Games	Wired Productions	Dec 9, 2019	Dec 10, 2019	Dec 10, 2019		
Away: Journey to the Unexpected	Adventure	Playdius Entertainment	Playdius Entertainment	Unreleased	Feb 8, 2019	Feb 8, 2019		
Awesomenauts Assemble	2D; multiplayer online battle arena	Ronimo Games	Ronimo Games	Unreleased	Sep 7, 2016	Sep 7, 2016		
Awesome Pea	Platformer	PigeonDev	Sometimes You	Mar 1, 2019	Mar 1, 2019	Mar 1, 2019		
The Awesome Adventures of Captain Spirit	Graphic adventure	Dontnod Entertainment	Square Enix	Unreleased	Jun 26, 2018	Jun 26, 2018		
Awkward	Party	Snap Finger Click	Snap Finger Click	Unreleased	Jun 5, 2018	Jun 5, 2018		
Axiom Verge	Metroidvania	Thomas Happ Games	Thomas Happ Games	Unreleased	Sep 29, 2016	Sep 29, 2016		
Axis Football 2018	Sports	Axis Games	Axis Games	Unreleased	Nov 30, 2018	Nov 30, 2018		
Axis Football 2019	Sports	Axis Games	Axis Games	Unreleased	Sep 27, 2019	Sep 27, 2019		
Azito x Tatsunoko Legends	Real-time strategy	Hamster Corporation	Hamster Corporation	Jun 25, 2015	Unreleased	Unreleased		
Azkend 2: The World Beneath	Puzzle	10tons	10tons	Unreleased	May 3, 2016	May 6, 2016		
Aztech: Forgotten Gods	Action-adventure	Lienzo	Lienzo	Mar 9, 2022	Mar 9, 2022	Mar 9, 2022		
Aztez	Beat 'em up; strategy	Team Colorblind	Team Colorblind	Unreleased	TBA	TBA		
Babylon 2055 Pinball	Pinball	Shine Research	Plug In Digital	Unreleased	Apr 21, 2018	Apr 21, 2018		
Back in 1995	Survival horror	Throw the Warped Code Out	Ratalaika Games	May 22, 2019	May 22, 2019	May 22, 2019		
Back to the Future: The Game – 30th Anniversary Edition	Adventure	Telltale Games	Telltale Games	Unreleased	Oct 13, 2015	Oct 16, 2015		
BackSlash	Platform arena brawler	Skeleton Crew Studios	Skeleton Crew Studios	Jun 21, 2019	Jun 21, 2019	Jun 21, 2019		
Bad North	Real-time strategy	Plausible Concept	Raw Fury	Unreleased	Aug 28, 2018	Aug 28, 2018	X	
Badland: Game of the Year Edition	Platformer	Frogmind	Frogmind	Unreleased	May 29, 2015	May 29, 2015		
Baila Latino	Music; rhythm	Oxygene Media	Oxygene Media	Unreleased	Aug 17, 2016	Aug 17, 2016		
Baja: Edge of Control	Racing	2XL Games	THQ Nordic	Unreleased	Sep 13, 2017	Sep 13, 2017		
Balan Wonderworld	Platform	Balan Company; Arzest	Square Enix	Mar 26, 2021	Mar 26, 2021	Mar 26, 2021		
Balatro	Roguelike deck-building	LocalThunk	Playstack	Feb 20, 2024	Feb 20, 2024	Feb 20, 2024		
Baldo	Role-playing	NAPS team	NAPS team	Aug 27, 2021	Aug 27, 2021	Aug 27, 2021		
Baldur's Gate: Dark Alliance	Action role-playing	Black Isle Studios	Interplay Entertainment	May 7, 2021	May 7, 2021	May 7, 2021		
Baldur's Gate: Enhanced Edition	Role-playing	Beamdog	Skybound Games	Oct 15, 2019	Oct 15, 2019	Oct 15, 2019		
Baldur's Gate II: Enhanced Edition	Role-playing	Beamdog	Skybound Games	Oct 15, 2019	Oct 15, 2019	Oct 15, 2019		
The Banner Saga	Tactical role-playing	Stoic Studio	Versus Evil	Unreleased	Jan 12, 2016	Jan 12, 2016		
The Banner Saga 2	Tactical role-playing	Stoic Studio	Versus Evil	Unreleased	Jul 1, 2016	Jul 1, 2016		
The Banner Saga 3	Tactical role-playing	Stoic Studio	Versus Evil	Unreleased	Jul 24, 2018	Jul 24, 2018		
Bard's Gold	Platformer	Pixel Lantern	Pixel Lantern	Unreleased	Jun 17, 2016	Jun 17, 2016		
The Bard's Tale IV: Director's Cut	Role-playing; dungeon crawler	InXile Entertainment	InXile Entertainment	Aug 27, 2019	Aug 27, 2019	Aug 27, 2019	PA	
The Bard's Tale Trilogy	Role-playing; dungeon crawler	Krome Studios	InXile Entertainment	Aug 13, 2019	Aug 13, 2019	Aug 13, 2019	X	
Baron: Fur is Gonna Fly	Party; shooter	Dogmelon Games	Dogmelon Games	Unreleased	Mar 4, 2020	Mar 4, 2020	X	
Baseball Riot	Puzzle	10tons	10tons	Unreleased	Dec 9, 2015	Dec 9, 2015		
Bastion	Role-playing	Supergiant Games	Warner Bros. Interactive Entertainment	Unreleased	Dec 12, 2016	Dec 12, 2016		
Batman: Arkham Knight	Action-adventure	Rocksteady Studios	Warner Bros. Interactive Entertainment	Unreleased	Jun 23, 2015	Jun 23, 2015		
Batman: Return to Arkham	Action-adventure	Rocksteady Studios	Warner Bros. Interactive Entertainment	Unreleased	Oct 17, 2016	Oct 17, 2016		
Batman: The Enemy Within	Graphic adventure	Telltale Games	Telltale Games	Unreleased	Aug 8, 2017	Aug 8, 2017		
Batman: The Telltale Series	Graphic adventure	Telltale Games	Telltale Games	Unreleased	Aug 2, 2016	Aug 2, 2016		
Battleborn	Action; multiplayer online battle arena	Gearbox Software	2K Games	Feb 9, 2016	May 3, 2016	May 3, 2016		
Battlefield 1	First-person shooter	DICE	Electronic Arts	Oct 21, 2016	Oct 21, 2016	Oct 21, 2016		
Battlefield 4	First-person shooter	EA Digital Illusions CE	Electronic Arts	Sep 4, 2014	Nov 22, 2013	Nov 22, 2013		
Battlefield V	First-person shooter	EA DICE	Electronic Arts	Oct 19, 2018	Oct 19, 2018	Oct 19, 2018	X	
Battlefield Hardline	First-person shooter	Visceral Games	Electronic Arts	Mar 19, 2015	Mar 17, 2015	Mar 20, 2015		
Battleship	Strategy	Frima Studios	Ubisoft	Unreleased	Aug 2, 2016	Aug 2, 2016		
Battlestar Galactica: Deadlock	Strategy	Slitherine Games	Slitherine Games	Unreleased	Dec 8, 2017	Dec 8, 2017		
Battletoads	Beat 'em up	Rare; Dlala Studios	Xbox Game Studios	Unreleased	Aug 20, 2020	Aug 20, 2020	PA	
Battlezone: Gold Edition	Shooter	Rebellion	Rebellion	Unreleased	May 1, 2018	May 1, 2018	X	
Battle Chasers: Nightwar	Role-playing	Airship Syndicate	THQ Nordic	Unreleased	Oct 3, 2017	Oct 3, 2017		
Battle Garegga Rev.2016	Arcade; shoot 'em up	M2	M2	Sep 29, 2017	Sep 29, 2017	Sep 29, 2017		
Battle High 2 A+	Fighting	Mattrified Games	Mattrified Games	Unreleased	Dec 16, 2015	Dec 16, 2015		
Battle Knights	Platformer	Mire Studios	Mire Studios	Unreleased	Jun 22, 2018	Jun 22, 2018		
Battle of the Bulge	Strategy	Shenandoah Studio	Slitherine Software	Unreleased	Aug 25, 2017	Aug 25, 2017		
Battle Princess Madelyn	Side-scrolling action	Causal Bit Games; Hound Picked Games	Causal Bit Games	Dec 6, 2018	Dec 6, 2018	Dec 6, 2018		
Battle Worlds: Kronos	Turn-based strategy	King Art	Nordic Games	Unreleased	Apr 26, 2016	Apr 26, 2016		
Bayonetta	Action; hack and slash	PlatinumGames	Sega	Unreleased	Feb 18, 2020	Feb 18, 2020	X	
Beach Buggy Racing	Racing	Vector Unit	Vector Unit	Unreleased	May 29, 2015	May 29, 2015		
Beacon	Roguelike	Monothetic	Monothetic	Unreleased	TBA	TBA		
Bears Can't Drift!?	Kart racing	Strangely Named	Strangely Named	Mar 27, 2020	Mar 27, 2020	Mar 27, 2020		
Bear With Me: The Complete Collection	Adventure	Exordium Games	Modus Games	Jul 30, 2019	Jul 31, 2019	Jul 30, 2019		
Beast Quest	Action-adventure	Torus Games	Maximum Games	Unreleased	Mar 13, 2018	Mar 13, 2018		
Beat Cop	Adventure; simulation	Crunching Koalas; Pixel Crow	11 Bit Studios	Mar 5, 2019	Mar 5, 2019	Mar 5, 2019		
Beat the Game	Adventure	Worm Animation	Worm Animation	Unreleased	TBA	TBA		
Beatbuddy: Tale of the Guardians	Action-adventure; platformer	Threaks	Threaks	Unreleased	Aug 7, 2015	Aug 7, 2015		
Beatsplosion for Kinect	Family, Motion Controlled	Virtual Air Guitar Company	Virtual Air Guitar Company	Unreleased	Dec 30, 2015	Dec 30, 2015	K	
Bedlam	First-person shooter	RedBedlam	RedBedlam	Unreleased	Oct 16, 2015	Oct 16, 2015		
Bee Simulator	Family	Varsav Game Studios	Bigben Interactive	Nov 14, 2019	Nov 12, 2019	Nov 14, 2019		
Before I Forget	Adventure	Plug In Digital	Plug In Digital	Apr 29, 2021	Apr 29, 2021	Apr 29, 2021		
Beholder: Complete Edition	Adventure; strategy	Warm Lamp Games; Alawar Entertainment	Curve Digital	Unreleased	Feb 2, 2018	Feb 2, 2018		
Beholder 2	Adventure; strategy	Warm Lamp Games; Alawar Entertainment	E-Home Entertainment	Apr 9, 2020	Apr 9, 2020	Apr 9, 2020		
Below	Adventure	Capybara Games	Capybara Games	Dec 14, 2018	Dec 14, 2018	Dec 14, 2018		
Ben 10	Action-adventure	Outright Games	Bandai Namco Entertainment	Unreleased	Nov 10, 2017	Nov 10, 2017		
Bendy and the Ink Machine	Horror	Joey Drew Studios	Rooster Teeth Games	Unreleased	Nov 20, 2018	Nov 20, 2018		
Besiege	Simulation	Spiderling Studios	Spiderling Studios	Feb 10, 2022	Feb 10, 2022	Feb 10, 2022		
Beyond Contact	Survival	Playcorp Studios	Deep Silver	TBA	TBA	TBA		
Beyond Eyes	Adventure	Tiger & Squid	Team17	Unreleased	Aug 4, 2015	Aug 4, 2015		
Beyond a Steel Sky	Adventure	Revolution Software	Microids	Nov 30, 2021	Nov 30, 2021	Nov 30, 2021		
Big Buck Hunter Arcade	Arcade, Shooter	GameMill Entertainment	GameMill Entertainment	Unreleased	Oct 24, 2016	Oct 24, 2016		
The Big Con	Adventure	Mighty Yell	Skybound Games	Aug 31, 2021	Aug 31, 2021	Aug 31, 2021		
Big Crown: Showdown	Party	Hyper Luminal Games	Sold Out Sales & Marketing	Dec 14, 2018	Dec 14, 2018	Dec 14, 2018	X	
Big Rumble Boxing: Creed Champions	Sports	Survios	Survios	Unreleased	Sep 3, 2021	Sep 3, 2021		
Bike Mayhem 2	Racing	Goldmark Studios	Goldmark Studios	Unreleased	Feb 5, 2016	Feb 5, 2016		
Big Pharma	Strategy, management	Twice Circled; Positech Games	Klabater	Dec 4, 2019	Dec 4, 2019	Dec 4, 2019		
Binaries	Platformer; puzzle	Ant Workshop	Ground Shatter	Unreleased	Aug 29, 2016	Aug 29, 2016		
The Binding of Isaac: Rebirth	Action-adventure; dungeon crawl; roguelike	Nicalis	Nicalis	Unreleased	Jul 24, 2015	Dec 9, 2015		
Biomutant	Action role-playing	Experiment 101	THQ Nordic	Unreleased	May 25, 2021	May 25, 2021		
Bioshock: The Collection	First-person shooter	Blind Squirrel Games	2K Games	Sep 13, 2016	Sep 13, 2016	Sep 13, 2016		
Biped	Puzzle platformer	NExT Studios	META Publishing	Unreleased	Sep 18, 2020	Sep 18, 2020		
Bird Game +	Action	Bryan Tabor	Ratalaika Games	May 1, 2019	May 1, 2019	May 1, 2019		
Birdcakes	Shoot 'em up	Green Lava Studios	Green Lava Studios	Unreleased	May 29, 2018	May 29, 2018		
Bit Dungeon Plus	Roguelike role-playing	Dolores Entertainment	Dolores Entertainment	May 5, 2017	May 5, 2017	May 5, 2017		
Bladed Fury	Side scroller, action	Next Studios	PM Studios	Unreleased	Jan 22, 2021	Jan 22, 2021		
Black Book	Adventure; role-playing	Morteshka	HypeTrain Digital	Unreleased	Aug 10, 2021	Aug 10, 2021		
Black Desert Online	Massively multiplayer online role-playing game	Pearl Abyss	Pearl Abyss	Unreleased	Mar 4, 2019	Mar 4, 2019	X	
Black Mirror	Horror Adventure	King Art Games	THQ Nordic	Unreleased	Nov 28, 2017	Nov 28, 2017		
Black & White Bushido	Multiplayer fighting, Stealth	Good Catch	Good Catch	Unreleased	May 16, 2017	May 16, 2017		
Black Paradox	Roguelite shoot 'em up	Fantastico Studio	Digerati	May 3, 2019	May 3, 2019	May 3, 2019		
Black the Fall	Puzzle-platform	Sand Sailor Studio	Square Enix	Unreleased	Jul 11, 2017	Jul 11, 2017		
Blackguards 2	Turn-based tactical role-playing	Daedalic Entertainment	Kalypso Media	Sep 12, 2017	Sep 12, 2017	Sep 12, 2017		
Blackhole: Complete Edition	Puzzle, Platformer	FiolaSoft Studio	1C Company	Unreleased	Aug 8, 2017	Aug 8, 2017		
The Blackout Club	Horror	Question	Question	Jul 30, 2019	Jul 30, 2019	Jul 30, 2019		
Blacksad: Under the Skin	Adventure	Pendulo Studios; Ys Interactive	Microïds	Nov 5, 2019	Nov 5, 2019	Nov 5, 2019		
Blacksea Odyssey	Action, Adventure, Role-playing	Spiral Summit Games	Team Blacksea Odyssey	Unreleased	Aug 8, 2017	Aug 8, 2017		
Blackwood Crossing	Adventure	PaperSeven	Vision Games Publishing	Unreleased	Apr 5, 2017	Apr 5, 2017		
Bladestorm: Nightmare	Action-adventure	Koei Tecmo	Koei Tecmo	Jan 29, 2015	Mar 17, 2015	Mar 20, 2015		
Blair Witch	Horror	Bloober Team	Bloober Team	Aug 30, 2019	Aug 30, 2019	Aug 30, 2019	X	
Blasphemous	Metroidvania hack & slash	The Game Kitchen	Team17	Unreleased	Sep 10, 2019	Sep 10, 2019		
Blast 'Em Bunnies	Shooter	Nnooo	Nnooo	Unreleased	Mar 11, 2016	Mar 11, 2016		
Blaster Master Zero	Platform	Inti Creates	Inti Creates	Jul 1, 2021	Jul 1, 2021	Jul 1, 2021		
Blaster Master Zero 2	Platform	Inti Creates	Inti Creates	Jul 15, 2021	Jul 15, 2021	Jul 15, 2021		
Blaster Master Zero 3	Platform	Inti Creates	Inti Creates	Jul 29, 2021	Jul 29, 2021	Jul 29, 2021		
Blast Brawl 2	Action-adventure; fighting; platformer	Mind's Eye Games	Mind's Eye Games	Unreleased	Oct 25, 2016	Oct 25, 2016		
Blast Zone! Tournament	Arcade; party	Victory Lap Games	Victory Lap Games	Jul 11, 2019	Jul 12, 2019	Jul 11, 2019	X	
BlazBlue Chrono Phantasma Extend	Fighting	Arc System Works	JP: Arc System Works; WW: Aksys Games	Apr 23, 2015	Jun 30, 2015	Oct 23, 2015		
Blazing Chrome	Side-scrolling action	Joymasher	The Arcade Crew	Jul 11, 2019	Jul 11, 2019	Jul 11, 2019		
Bleed	Platform	Bootdisk Revolution; Nephilim Game Studios	Digerati	Unreleased	Aug 24, 2017	Aug 24, 2017		
Bleed 2	Platform	Bootdisk Revolution; Nephilim Game Studios	Digerati	Unreleased	Feb 9, 2018	Feb 9, 2018		
Bleeding Edge	Brawler	Ninja Theory	Xbox Game Studios	Mar 24, 2020	Mar 24, 2020	Mar 24, 2020		
Blind Men	Visual novel	Man-Eater Games	Ratalaika Games	Apr 15, 2020	Apr 15, 2020	Apr 15, 2020		
Blood Bowl 2	Sports; real-time strategy; turn-based strategy	Cyanide	Focus Home Interactive	Unreleased	Sep 22, 2015	Sep 22, 2015		
Blood Waves	Horde shooter	Light Road Games	Sometimes You	Mar 15, 2019	Mar 15, 2019	Mar 15, 2019		
Bloodstained: Curse of the Moon	Side-Scrolling Action	Inti Creates	Inti Creates	Jun 6, 2018	Jun 6, 2018	Jun 6, 2018		
Bloodstained: Curse of the Moon 2	Action; platform	ArtPlay; Inti Creates	505 Games	Jul 10, 2020	Jul 10, 2020	Jul 10, 2020		
Bloodstained: Ritual of the Night	Metroidvania	Inti Creates	505 Games	Jun 18, 2019	Jun 18, 2019	Jun 18, 2019		
Bloody Zombies	Brawler	Paw Print Games	nDreams	Unreleased	Sep 21, 2017	Sep 21, 2017		
Bloons TD 5	Strategy; puzzle	Ninja Kiwi	Ninja Kiwi	Unreleased	Mar 2, 2017	Mar 2, 2017		
Blue Angels: Aerobatic Flight Simulator	Simulation	Rortos	Rortos	Unreleased	Dec 1, 2017	Dec 1, 2017		
Blue-Collar Astronaut	Action	Mutated Software	Mutated Software	Unreleased	Mar 17, 2017	Mar 17, 2017		
Blue Estate	First-person shooter; rail shooter; motion-controlled	Hesaw	Focus Home Interactive	Unreleased	Feb 18, 2015	Feb 18, 2015		
Blue Fire	Shooter	Robi Studios	Graffiti Games	Unreleased	Jul 9, 2021	Jul 9, 2021		
Blue Rider	Shooter	Ravegan	Ravegan	Unreleased	Oct 11, 2016	Oct 11, 2016		
Blues and Bullets	Action-adventure	A Crowd of Monsters	A Crowd of Monsters	Unreleased	Aug 28, 2015	Aug 28, 2015		
Boggle	Card & Board	Frima Studios	Ubisoft	Unreleased	Aug 4, 2015	Aug 4, 2015		
Boiling Bolt	Shooter	Persistant Studio	Plug In Digital	Unreleased	Dec 5, 2017	Dec 5, 2017		
Bokosuka Wars II	Strategy	Pygmy Studio	Pygmy Studio	Unreleased	Feb 24, 2017	Feb 24, 2017		
Bomber Crew	Strategy; management	Runner Duck Games	Curve Digital	Unreleased	Jul 10, 2018	Jul 10, 2018	X	
Bombfest	Puzzle	Sudden Event Studios	Whitethorn Digital	Jan 31, 2019	Jan 31, 2019	Jan 31, 2019	X	
Bombing Busters	Arcade, Classics	Sanuk Games	Sanuk Games	Unreleased	Nov 17, 2016	Nov 17, 2016		
Bombslinger	Puzzle	Mode4	Plug In Digital	Unreleased	Apr 11, 2018	Apr 11, 2018		
Bonds of the Skies	Role-playing	Hit Point	Kemco	Mar 1, 2019	Mar 1, 2019	Mar 1, 2019	PA	
Book of Demons	Action role-playing; hack and slash	Thing Trunk	Thing Trunk	Apr 30, 2020	Apr 30, 2020	Apr 30, 2020		
The Book of Unwritten Tales 2	Adventure	King Art	Nordic Games	Unreleased	Sep 18, 2015	Sep 18, 2015		
Boom Ball for Kinect	Family; motion-controlled	Virtual Air Guitar Company	Virtual Air Guitar Company	Unreleased	Nov 28, 2014	Dec 5, 2014	K	
Boom Ball for Kinect 2	Family; motion-controlled	Virtual Air Guitar Company	Virtual Air Guitar Company	Unreleased	Dec 21, 2016	Dec 21, 2016	K	
Boom Ball for Kinect 3	Family; motion-controlled	Virtual Air Guitar Company	Virtual Air Guitar Company	Unreleased	Dec 21, 2017	Dec 21, 2017	K	
Boomerang Fu	Action; Fighting; Local Multiplayer	Cranky Watermelon	Cranky Watermelon	Aug 13, 2020	Aug 13, 2020	Aug 13, 2020		
Borderlands: Game of the Year Edition	First-person shooter; loot shooter	Gearbox Software	2K Games	Apr 3, 2019	Apr 3, 2019	Apr 3, 2019	X	
Borderlands: The Handsome Collection	Action role-playing; first-person shooter	Gearbox Software	2K Games	May 14, 2015	Mar 24, 2015	Mar 27, 2015		
Borderlands 3	Action role-playing; first-person shooter	Gearbox Software	2K Games	Sep 13, 2019	Sep 13, 2019	Sep 13, 2019	X	
Boss 101	Shoot 'em up Roguelite	Donley Time Foundation	Donley Time Foundation	May 18, 2018	May 18, 2018	May 18, 2018		
Boulder Dash Deluxe	Puzzle	BBG Entertainment	BBG Entertainment	Sep 9, 2021	Sep 9, 2021	Sep 9, 2021		
Bounce Rescue!	Platformer; puzzle	Bitecore	Bitecore	Unreleased	May 4, 2018	May 4, 2018		
Bouncy Bullets	Platform; shooter	Petite Games	Ratalaika Games	Unreleased	Jul 10, 2019	Jul 10, 2019		
Bow to Blood: Last Captain Standing	Sci-fi combat flight sim	Tribetoy	Tribetoy	Unreleased	Apr 3, 2019	Apr 3, 2019		
Boy and His Blob	Platform, puzzle	Abstraction Games	Majesco	Unreleased	Jan 20, 2016	Jan 20, 2016		
BPM: Bullets Per Minute	First-person shooter, roguelike	Awe Interactive	Awe Interactive	Unreleased	Oct 5, 2021	Oct 5, 2021		
The Bradwell Conspiracy	Adventure	A Brave Plan	Bossa Studios	Oct 11, 2019	Oct 11, 2019	Oct 11, 2019		
Braid Anniversary Edition	Puzzle; Platform	Number None	Number None	May 14, 2024	May 14, 2024	May 14, 2024		
Bratz: Flaunt Your Fashion	Adventure	Petoons Studio	Outright Games	Nov 4, 2022	Nov 4, 2022	Nov 4, 2022		
Braveland Trilogy	Strategy, tactics	Tortuga Team	Ellada Games	Apr 10, 2020	Apr 10, 2020	Apr 10, 2020	X	
Brawl Chess	Strategy	RedDeerGames	RedDeerGames	Unreleased	Nov 26, 2020	Nov 26, 2020		
Breach & Clear: Deadline	Strategy; simulation	Mighty Rabbit Studios	Mighty Rabbit Studios	Unreleased	Aug 3, 2016	Aug 3, 2016		
Breakers Collection	Fighting	Visco Corporation	QUByte Interactive	Unreleased	Jan 23, 2023	Jan 23, 2023		
Breakout: Recharged	Puzzle	Adamvision Studios; SneakyBox	Atari, Inc.	Unreleased	Feb 10, 2022	Feb 10, 2022		
Breathedge	Action-Adventure, Survival	Redruins Softworks	HypeTrain Digital	Feb 25, 2021	Feb 25, 2021	Feb 25, 2021		
Brick Breaker	Puzzle	Sanuk Games	Bigben Interactive	Unreleased	Apr 26, 2016	Apr 26, 2016		
The Bridge	Platforming	Quantum Astrophysicists Guild	Quantum Astrophysicists Guild	Aug 14, 2015	Aug 14, 2015	Aug 14, 2015		
Bridge Constructor	Simulation	Clockstone Studio	Headup Games	Unreleased	Aug 21, 2015	Aug 21, 2015		
Bridge Constructor Portal	Simulation	Clockstone Studio	Headup Games	Unreleased	Feb 28, 2018	Feb 28, 2018		
Bridge Constructor Stunts	Simulation	Clockstone Studio	Headup Games	Unreleased	Dec 16, 2016	Dec 16, 2016		
Bridge Constructor: The Walking Dead	Simulation	Clockstone Studio	Headup Games	Unreleased	Nov 19, 2020	Nov 19, 2020		
Brief Battles	Party platform fighter	Juicy Cupcake	Juicy Cupcake	Unreleased	May 7, 2019	May 6, 2019	X	
Bring to Light	Horror	Red Meat Games	Red Meat Games	May 24, 2019	May 24, 2019	May 24, 2019		
Broken Age: The Complete Adventure	Point-and-click adventure	Double Fine Productions	Double Fine Productions	Unreleased	Jun 23, 2017	Jun 23, 2017		
Broken Sword 5: The Serpent's Curse	Point-and-click adventure	Revolution Software	Revolution Software	Unreleased	Sep 4, 2015	Sep 4, 2015		
Brothers: A Tale of Two Sons	Action & Adventure	Starbreeze Studios; The Workshop	505 Games	Unreleased	Aug 12, 2015	Aug 12, 2015		
Brunswick Pro Bowling	Sports	FarSight Studios	Alliance Digital Media	Unreleased	Nov 27, 2015	Nov 27, 2015		
Brutal Rage	Brawler, retro	2Bad Games	2Bad Games	Apr 22, 2020	Apr 22, 2020	Apr 22, 2020		
Bubsy 4D	Platform	Fabraz	Atari	May 22, 2026	May 22, 2026	May 22, 2026		
Bucket Knight	Side-scrolling action, retro	PigeonDev	Sometimes You	Feb 28, 2020	Feb 28, 2020	Feb 28, 2020	X	
Buckshot Roulette	Digital tabletop; Horror	Mike Klubnika	Critical Reflex	Jul 8, 2026	Jul 8, 2026	Jul 8, 2026		
Bud Spencer & Terence Hill: Slaps and Beans	Brawler	Trinity Team	Buddy Productions	Unreleased	Jul 24, 2018	Jul 24, 2018		
Bug Butcher	Action	Awfully Nice Studios	Triangle Studios	Unreleased	Oct 18, 2016	Oct 18, 2016		
Bulb Boy	Adventure, Horror	Bulbware	Bulbware	Unreleased	Oct 6, 2017	Oct 6, 2017		
Bulletstorm: Full Clip Edition	Shooter	Electronic Arts	Gearbox Publishing	Apr 7, 2017	Apr 7, 2017	Apr 7, 2017		
The Bunker	Point & Click Adventure	Splendy Games	Wales Interactive	Unreleased	Sep 22, 2016	Sep 22, 2016		
Burnout Paradise Remastered	Racing	Stellar Entertainment	Electronic Arts	Mar 15, 2018	Mar 16, 2018	Mar 16, 2018		
Bus Simulator 18	Simulation	Stillalive Studios	Astragon	Sep 16, 2019	Sep 17, 2019	Sep 16, 2019		
Bus Simulator 21	Simulation	Stillalive Studios	Astragon	Sep 7, 2021	Sep 7, 2021	Sep 7, 2021		
Bush Hockey League	Sports	V7 Entertainment	V7 Entertainment	Unreleased	Nov 29, 2017	Nov 29, 2017		
Butcher	Shooter	Transhuman Design	Crunching Koalas	Unreleased	May 10, 2017	May 10, 2017		
Cake Bash	Party; beat 'em up	High Tea Frog	Coatsink	Oct 15, 2020	Oct 14, 2020	Oct 15, 2020		
Calico	Life simulation	Peachy Keen Games	Whitethorn Digital	Unreleased	Dec 15, 2020	Dec 15, 2020		
Call of Cthulhu: The Official Video Game	Adventure; survival horror	Cyanide Studio	Focus Home Interactive	Unreleased	Oct 30, 2018	Oct 30, 2018		
Call of Duty: Advanced Warfare	First-person shooter	Sledgehammer Games	Activision	Nov 13, 2014	Nov 4, 2014	Nov 4, 2014		
Call of Duty: Black Ops III	First-person shooter	Treyarch	Activision	Nov 6, 2015	Nov 6, 2015	Nov 6, 2015		
Call of Duty: Black Ops IIII	First-person shooter	Treyarch	Activision	Oct 12, 2018	Oct 12, 2018	Oct 12, 2018	X	
Call of Duty: Black Ops 6	First-person shooter	Treyarch; Raven Software	Activision	Oct 25, 2024	Oct 25, 2024	Oct 25, 2024		
Call of Duty: Black Ops 7	First-person shooter	Treyarch; Raven Software	Activision	Nov 14, 2025	Nov 14, 2025	Nov 14, 2025		
Call of Duty: Black Ops Cold War	First-person shooter	Treyarch; Raven Software	Activision	Nov 13, 2020	Nov 13, 2020	Nov 13, 2020		
Call of Duty: Ghosts	First-person shooter	Infinity Ward	JP: Square Enix; WW: Activision	Sep 4, 2014	Nov 22, 2013	Nov 22, 2013		
Call of Duty: Infinite Warfare	First-person shooter	Infinity Ward	Activision	Nov 4, 2016	Nov 4, 2016	Nov 4, 2016	X	
Call of Duty: Modern Warfare	First-person shooter	Infinity Ward	Activision	Oct 25, 2019	Oct 25, 2019	Oct 25, 2019	HDR X	
Call of Duty: Modern Warfare II	First-person shooter	Infinity Ward	Activision	Oct 28, 2022	Oct 28, 2022	Oct 28, 2022		
Call of Duty: Modern Warfare III	First-person shooter	Sledgehammer Games	Activision	Nov 10, 2023	Nov 10, 2023	Nov 10, 2023		
Call of Duty: Modern Warfare Remastered	First-person shooter	Infinity Ward	Activision	Jul 27, 2017	Jul 27, 2017	Jul 27, 2017		
Call of Duty: Vanguard	First-person shooter	Sledgehammer Games	Activision	Nov 5, 2021	Nov 5, 2021	Nov 5, 2021		
Call of Duty: Warzone	First-person shooter	Infinity Ward; Raven Software	Activision	Mar 10, 2020	Mar 10, 2020	Mar 10, 2020		
Call of Duty: WWII	First-person shooter	Sledgehammer Games; Raven Software	Activision	Nov 3, 2017	Nov 3, 2017	Nov 3, 2017	HDR X	
Call of the Sea	Puzzle adventure	Out of the Blue	Raw Fury	Unreleased	Dec 8, 2020	Dec 8, 2020		
Can't Drive This	Racing	Pixel Maniacs	Pixel Maniacs	Mar 19, 2021	Mar 19, 2021	Mar 19, 2021		
Canadian Football 2017	Sports	Canuck Play	Canuck Play	Unreleased	Jul 25, 2017	Jul 25, 2017		
Candleman	Platformer	Spotlightor Interactive	E-Home Entertainment	Feb 1, 2017	Feb 1, 2017	Feb 1, 2017		
Candle: The Power of the Flame	Adventure-Platformer	Teku Studios	Merge Games	Unreleased	Jul 25, 2018	Jul 25, 2018		
Cannon Brawl	Action, Strategy	Turtle Sandbox	Turtle Sandbox	Unreleased	Aug 3, 2016	Aug 3, 2016		
Capcom Arcade Stadium	Arcade	Capcom	Capcom	May 25, 2021	May 25, 2021	May 25, 2021		
Capcom Beat 'Em Up Bundle	Beat 'em up	Capcom	Capcom	Sep 20, 2018	Sep 18, 2018	Sep 18, 2018		
Captain Cat	Arcade	Rendercode Games	Digital Tentacle	Jun 20, 2019	Jun 21, 2019	Jun 20, 2019		
Cardpocalypse	Card battler, role-playing	Gambrinous	Versus Evil	Dec 12, 2019	Dec 12, 2019	Dec 12, 2019	X	
Caretaker	Horror	Baris Tarimcioglu	TensePulseGames	Oct 23, 2019	Oct 23, 2019	Oct 23, 2019	X	
Carmageddon: Max Damage	Vehicular combat, Racing	Stainless Games	Stainless Games	Unreleased	Jul 8, 2016	Jul 8, 2016		
Car Mechanic Simulator 2018	Simulation	PlayWay	Red Dot Games	Jun 25, 2019	Jun 25, 2019	Jun 25, 2019		
Carnival Games	Party game	Mass Media Games	2K Games	Nov 6, 2018	Nov 6, 2018	Nov 6, 2018		
Carrion	Horror	Phobia Game Studio	Devolver Digital	Unreleased	Jul 23, 2020	Jul 23, 2020		
Cars 3: Driven to Win	Racing	Avalanche Software	Warner Bros. Interactive Entertainment	Unreleased	Jun 13, 2017	Jun 13, 2017		
Carto	Adventure; Puzzle	Sunhead Games	Humble Games	Oct 27, 2020	Oct 27, 2020	Oct 27, 2020		
Cartoon Network: Battle Crashers	Action & Adventure	Magic Pockets	GameMill Entertainment	Unreleased	Nov 7, 2016	Nov 7, 2016		
Case: Animatronics	Horror	Walnut	Walnut	Jul 19, 2019	Jul 19, 2019	Jul 19, 2019		
Casey Powell Lacrosse 16	Sports	Big Ant Studios	Big Ant Studios	Unreleased	Mar 9, 2016	Mar 9, 2016		
Casey Powell Lacrosse 18	Sports	Big Ant Studios	Crosse Studios	Unreleased	Apr 18, 2018	Apr 18, 2018	X	
Cassette Beasts	Role-playing	Bytten Studio	Raw Fury	Unreleased	TBA	TBA		
Cast of the Seven Godsends: Redux	Platformer	Raven Travel Studios	Merge Games	Unreleased	Jul 20, 2016	Jul 20, 2016		
Castaway Paradise	Life simulation	Stolen Couch Games	Stolen Couch Games	Unreleased	Jul 31, 2018	Jul 31, 2018		
Castle Crashers: Remastered	Beat 'em up	The Behemoth	The Behemoth	Unreleased	Sep 9, 2015	Sep 9, 2015		
Castle Invasion: Throne Out	Action & Adventure	Cat Trap Studios	Cat Trap Studios	Unreleased	Oct 11, 2016	Oct 11, 2016		
Castle of No Escape 2	Action role-playing, roguelite, retro	D.E.X Team	Xitilon	Feb 26, 2020	Feb 26, 2020	Feb 26, 2020		
Castles	Puzzle	WhootGames	BadLand Indie	Unreleased	Oct 4, 2016	Oct 4, 2016		
CastleStorm: Definitive Edition	Tower defense	Zen Studios	Zen Studios	Sep 23, 2014	Sep 23, 2014	Sep 23, 2014		
CastleStorm II	Tower defense	Zen Studios	Zen Studios	Jul 31, 2020	Jul 31, 2020	Jul 31, 2020		
Catastronauts	Cooperative action-puzzler	Inertia Game Studios	Inertia Game Studios	Unreleased	Sep 28, 2018	Sep 28, 2018		
Castlevania Advance Collection	Action; platform-adventure	Konami	Konami	Sep 23, 2021	Sep 23, 2021	Sep 23, 2021		
Castlevania Anniversary Collection	Retro collection, Metroidvania	Konami	Konami	May 16, 2019	May 16, 2019	May 16, 2019		
Cat Quest II	Action role-playing	The Gentlebros	PQube	Oct 24, 2019	Oct 24, 2019	Oct 24, 2019		
Caveman Warriors	Platformer	JanduSoft	JanduSoft	Unreleased	Sep 21, 2017	Sep 21, 2017		
Cel Damage	Racing	Finish Line Games	Finish Line Games	Unreleased	Mar 11, 2016	Mar 11, 2016		
Celeste	Adventure, Platformer	Matt Makes Games	Matt Makes Games	Unreleased	Jan 26, 2018	Jan 26, 2018		
Centipede: Recharged	Puzzle	Adamvision Studios; SneakyBox	Atari, Inc.	Unreleased	Sep 29, 2021	Sep 29, 2021		
Chaos;Child	Visual novel	Nitroplus	5pb.	Dec 18, 2014	Unreleased	Unreleased		
Chaos on Deponia	Point-and-click adventure	Daedalic Entertainment	Daedalic Entertainment	Unreleased	Dec 6, 2017	Dec 6, 2017		
Chariot	Platform	Frima Studio	Frima Studio	Oct 1, 2014	Oct 1, 2014	Oct 1, 2014		
Chasm	Metroidvania	Bit Kid	Bit Kid	Unreleased	Nov 9, 2018	Nov 9, 2018		
Chernobylite	Survival	The Farm 51	All In! Games	Sep 7, 2021	Sep 7, 2021	Sep 7, 2021		
Chess Ultra	Chess	Ripstone	Ripstone	Unreleased	Jun 23, 2017	Jun 23, 2017	X	
Chicken Police: Paint it Red!	Adventure	The Wild Gentlemen	HandyGames	Unreleased	Nov 5, 2020	Nov 5, 2020		
Child of Light	Platform; role-playing	Ubisoft Montreal	Ubisoft	Sep 4, 2014	Apr 29, 2014	Apr 29, 2014		
Children of Morta	Action role-playing	Dead Mage	11 Bit Studios	Oct 15, 2019	Oct 15, 2019	Oct 15, 2019	PA	
Children of Zodiarcs	Tactical role-playing	Cardboard Utopia	Plug In Digital	Mar 27, 2020	Mar 27, 2020	Mar 27, 2020	PA	
Chime Sharp	Music, Puzzle	Chilled Mouse	Chilled Mouse	Unreleased	Feb 24, 2017	Feb 24, 2017		
Chivalry: Medieval Warfare	Fighting	Hardsuit Labs	Activision	Unreleased	Dec 2, 2015	Dec 2, 2015		
Choo-Choo Charles	Adventure	Two Star Games	Two Star Games	Dec 21, 2023	Dec 21, 2023	Dec 21, 2023	PA PC	
Chroma Squad	Turn based, Management	Behold Studios	Bandai Namco Entertainment	Unreleased	May 18, 2017	May 18, 2017		
ChromaGun	First-person shooter, puzzle	Pixel Maniacs	Pixel Maniacs	Unreleased	Aug 23, 2017	Aug 23, 2017		
Chronus Arc	Japanese role-playing	Hit Point	Kemco	Oct 10, 2018	Oct 10, 2018	Oct 10, 2018	PA	
The Church in the Darkness	Action Adventure, Stealth	Paranoid Productions	Fellow Traveler	Unreleased	Aug 2, 2019	Aug 2, 2019	X	
Circuit Breakers	Shooter	Triverske	Excalibur Games	Unreleased	Aug 16, 2017	Aug 16, 2017		
Circuits	Puzzle	Digital Tentacle	Digital Tentacle	Unreleased	Dec 14, 2017	Dec 14, 2017		
Citadel: Forged with Fire	Massively multiplayer online role-playing	Blue Isle Studios; Virtual Basement	Blue Isle Studios	Unreleased	Nov 1, 2019	Nov 1, 2019	X	
Cities: Skylines	City-building, construction and management simulation	Tantalus Media	Paradox Interactive	Apr 21, 2017	Apr 21, 2017	Apr 21, 2017		
Citizens of Space	Role-playing	Eden Industries	Sega	Unreleased	Jun 18, 2019	Jun 18, 2019		
City of Brass	First-person hack & slash roguelike	Uppercut Games	Uppercut Games	Unreleased	May 4, 2018	May 4, 2018	X	
Civilization VI	4X; turn-based strategy	Firaxis Games	2K Games	Nov 22, 2019	Nov 22, 2019	Nov 22, 2019		
Civilization VII	4X; turn-based strategy	Firaxis Games	2K Games	Feb 11, 2025	Feb 11, 2025	Feb 11, 2025		
Claire: Extended Cut	Adventure	Hailstorm Games	Hailstorm Games	Unreleased	Sep 5, 2016	Sep 5, 2016		
Clash	Arena Fighter	FennecFox Entertainment	FennecFox Entertainment	Unreleased	Aug 21, 2015	Aug 21, 2015		
Claws of Furry	Action & Adventure	Terahard	Terahard	Unreleased	Sep 4, 2018	Sep 4, 2018	X	
Claybook	Puzzle, Physics Sandbox	Second Order	Second Order	Unreleased	Aug 31, 2018	Aug 31, 2018	X	
The Clocker	Puzzle adventure	Wildkid Games	E-Home Entertainment	Dec 27, 2019	Dec 27, 2019	Dec 27, 2019	X	
Clockwork Tales: Of Glass and Ink	Point & Click	Artifex Mundi	Artifex Mundi	Unreleased	Jan 22, 2016	Jan 22, 2016		
Clone Drone in the Danger Zone	Action; fighting	Doborog Games	Doborog Games	Unreleased	Jul 27, 2021	Jul 27, 2021		
Close to the Sun	Horror	Storm in a Teacup	Wired Productions	Oct 28, 2019	Oct 29, 2019	Oct 28, 2019	X	
Clouds & Sheep 2	Puzzle	HandyGames	HandyGames	Unreleased	Nov 17, 2016	Nov 17, 2016		
ClusterPuck 99	Sports	PHL Collective	PHL Collective	Unreleased	Sep 9, 2015	Sep 9, 2015		
ClusterTruck	Platformer	Landfall Games	TinyBuild	Unreleased	Sep 27, 2016	Sep 27, 2016		
Cobalt	Action-sidescroller	Oxeye Game Studio; Fatshark	Mojang	Feb 2, 2016	Feb 2, 2016	Feb 2, 2016		
Cobra Kai: The Karate Kid Saga Continues	Beat 'em up	Flux Game Studio	GameMill Entertainment	Unreleased	Oct 27, 2020	Oct 27, 2020		
Code Shifter	Side-scrolling action	Arc System Works	Arc System Works	Jan 30, 2020	Jan 30, 2020	Jan 30, 2020		
Code Vein	Action role-playing	Bandai Namco Studios	Bandai Namco Entertainment	Sep 27, 2019	Sep 27, 2019	Sep 27, 2019		
Coffee Crisis	Beat 'em up	Mega Cat Studios	E360 Technologies	Unreleased	Aug 15, 2018	Aug 15, 2018		
Coffee Talk	Visual novel	Toge Productions	Chorus Worldwide	Jan 29, 2020	Jan 31, 2020	Jan 30, 2020		
Coffin Dodgers	Racing	Milky Tea Studios	Wales Interactive	Unreleased	May 6, 2016	May 6, 2016		
Cogen: Sword of Rewind	Platform	Gemdrops	Gemdrops	Jan 27, 2022	Jan 27, 2022	Jan 27, 2022		
Colina: Legacy	Horror, Adventure	Chance6 Studios	Chance6 Studios	Sep 13, 2019	Sep 13, 2019	Sep 13, 2019		
Color Symphony 2	Platform, Puzzle	Remimory	Remimory	Unreleased	Jun 8, 2016	Jun 8, 2016		
Coma	Adventure	Jason Oda	Jason Oda	Unreleased	TBA	TBA		
The Coma: Recut	Horror, Survival	Devespresso Games	Digerati	Unreleased	Sep 21, 2017	Sep 21, 2017		
The Coma 2: Vicious Sisters	Horror, Survival	Devespresso Games	Digerati	Unreleased	Sep 4, 2020	Sep 4, 2020		
Commander Cherry for Kinect	Platform	Grande Games	Grande Games	Unreleased	Aug 14, 2015	Aug 14, 2015		
The Complex	FMV adventure	Wales Interactive	Wales Interactive	Mar 31, 2020	Mar 31, 2020	Mar 31, 2020		
Conan Exiles	Open World Survival	Funcom	Funcom	Unreleased	May 8, 2018	May 8, 2018	X	
Conarium	Horror	Zoetrope Interactive	Iceberg Interactive	Feb 11, 2019	Feb 12, 2019	Feb 11, 2019	X	
Conga Master	Action	Undercoders	Rising Star Games	Unreleased	Jul 21, 2017	Jul 21, 2017		
Conglomerate 451: Overloaded	Dungeon crawler	RuneHeads	34BigThings	Unreleased	Jun 3, 2021	Unreleased		
Construction Simulator 2: Console Edition	Strategy, Simulation	weltenbauer	Astragon	Unreleased	Sep 12, 2018	Sep 12, 2018	X	
Construction Simulator 3: Console Edition	Simulation	weltenbauer	Astragon	Apr 7, 2020	Apr 7, 2020	Apr 7, 2020		
Constructor HD	Strategy, Simulation	System 3	System 3	Unreleased	Feb 28, 2017	Feb 28, 2017		
Constructor Plus	Strategy, Simulation	System 3	System 3	Unreleased	Sep 25, 2019	Sep 25, 2019		
Contra Anniversary Collection	Classics collection	Konami	Konami	Jun 12, 2019	Jun 11, 2019	Jun 11, 2019		
Contra: Rogue Corps	Twin-stick shooter	Konami	Konami	Sep 25, 2019	Sep 24, 2019	Sep 25, 2019		
Contrast	Puzzle; action; platform	Compulsion Games	Compulsion Games	Unreleased	Jun 26, 2014	Jun 26, 2014		
Control	Third-person shooter; action-adventure	Remedy Entertainment	505 Games	Unreleased	Aug 27, 2019	Aug 27, 2019	X	
Convoy: A Tactical Roguelike	Strategy; tactical role-playing; roguelike	Convoy Games	Triangle Studios	Apr 8, 2020	Apr 8, 2020	Apr 8, 2020		
Cookie Clicker	Incremental	DashNet	Playsaurus	May 22, 2025	May 22, 2025	May 22, 2025		
Cook, Serve, Delicious! 3	Simulation	Vertigo Gaming	Vertigo Gaming	Unreleased	Oct 14, 2020	Oct 14, 2020		
Core Keeper	Sandbox; survival	Pugstorm	Fireshine Games	Sep 17, 2024	Sep 17, 2024	Sep 17, 2024		
Costume Quest 2	Role-playing	Double Fine Productions	Midnight City	Oct 31, 2014	Oct 31, 2014	Oct 31, 2014		
The Council	Adventure	Big Bad Wolf	Focus Home Interactive	Unreleased	Mar 13, 2018	Mar 13, 2018		
The Count Lucanor	Action-adventure	Baroque Decay; Ratalaika Games	Merge Games	Unreleased	Mar 21, 2018	Mar 21, 2018		
Cowboy Kart	Racing	Cascadia Games	Cascadia Games	Mar 19, 2026	Mar 19, 2026	Mar 19, 2026		
Crackdown 3	Action adventure	Sumo Digital	Xbox Game Studios	Feb 15, 2019	Feb 15, 2019	Feb 15, 2019	PA PC	
Craftopia	Survival	Pocketpair	Pocketpair	Sep 2, 2021	Sep 2, 2021	Sep 2, 2021		
Crash Bandicoot 4: It's About Time	Platform	Toys for Bob	Activision	Oct 2, 2020	Oct 2, 2020	Oct 2, 2020		
Crash Bandicoot N. Sane Trilogy	Platform	Vicarious Visions	Activision	Jun 29, 2018	Jun 29, 2018	Jun 29, 2018		
Crash Force	Arena Shooter	Ascanio Entertainment	Ascanio Entertainment	Unreleased	TBA	TBA		
Crash Team Racing Nitro-Fueled	Racing, Karts	Beenox	Activision	Jun 21, 2019	Jun 21, 2019	Jun 21, 2019	X	
Crawl	Roguelike, brawler	Powerhoof	Powerhoof	Unreleased	Apr 11, 2017	Apr 11, 2017		
Crayola Scoot	Racing, Sport	Climax Studios	Outright Games	Unreleased	Oct 16, 2018	Oct 23, 2018	X	
Crazy Strike Bowling EX	Sport	Corecell Technology	Corecell Technology	Unreleased	Jun 27, 2017	Jun 27, 2017		
Creature in the Well	Action-adventure, Role-playing	Flight School Studio	Flight School Studio	Sep 6, 2019	Sep 6, 2019	Sep 6, 2019	PA X	
Creepy Road	Side-scrolling action	Groovy Milk	Groovy Milk	Mar 1, 2019	Mar 1, 2019	Mar 1, 2019		
The Crew	Racing	Ubisoft Ivory Tower; Ubisoft Reflections	Ubisoft	Dec 4, 2014	Dec 2, 2014	Dec 2, 2014		
The Crew 2	Racing	Ubisoft Ivory Tower	Ubisoft	Jun 29, 2018	Jun 29, 2018	Jun 29, 2018	X	
The Crew Motorfest	Racing	Ubisoft Ivory Tower	Ubisoft	Sep 14, 2023	Sep 14, 2023	Sep 14, 2023	X	
Cricket 19	Sports	Big Ant Studios	Big Ant Studios	May 28, 2019	May 28, 2019	May 28, 2019	X	
Cricket 22	Sports	Big Ant Studios	Nacon	Unreleased	Nov 25, 2021	Nov 25, 2021		
Crimson Dragon	Rail shooter	Grounding	Xbox Game Studios	Sep 4, 2014	Nov 22, 2013	Nov 22, 2013	K	
Crimson Keep	First-person roguelike, Dungeon crawler	Team Crimson	Merge Games	Mar 6, 2019	Mar 6, 2019	Mar 6, 2019		
Crimsonland	Shooter	10tons	10tons	Unreleased	Oct 14, 2015	Oct 14, 2015		
Cris Tales	Japanese role-playing	Dreams Uncorporated; SYCK	Modus Games	Unreleased	Nov 17, 2020	Nov 17, 2020		
CrossCode	Action role-playing	Radical Fish Games	Deck13	Jul 9, 2020	Jul 9, 2020	Jul 9, 2020		
CrossfireX	First-person shooter	Smilegate	Xbox Game Studios	Feb 10, 2022	Feb 10, 2022	Feb 10, 2022	X	
CrossKrush	Puzzle	Thinice Games	Ratalaika Games	Oct 21, 2020	Oct 21, 2020	Oct 21, 2020		
Crossroads Inn	Simulation	Klabater	Klabater	Unreleased	May 19, 2021	May 19, 2021		
CrushBorgs	Platform; Acton	Xitilon	Xitilon	Apr 20, 2022	Apr 20, 2022	Apr 20, 2022		
Cruz Brothers	Fighting	DCF Studios	DCF Studios	Feb 5, 2020	Feb 5, 2020	Feb 5, 2020		
Crypt of the NecroDancer	Roguelike, rhythm	Brace Yourself Games	Brace Yourself Games	Unreleased	Feb 10, 2017	Feb 10, 2017		
Crypt of the Serpent King	Hack and slash	Rendercode Games	Rendercode Games	Unreleased	Dec 20, 2016	Dec 20, 2016		
Crysis Remastered	First-person shooter, stealth	Crytek	Crytek	Unreleased	Sep 18, 2020	Sep 18, 2020		
Cryogear	Metroidvania, action-adventure	Adrian Zingg	PolarityFlow	Apr 17, 2020	Apr 17, 2020	Apr 17, 2020		
Cubikolor	Puzzle	Fractal Box	Moving Player	Unreleased	May 20, 2016	May 20, 2016		
Cube Life: Island Survival HD	Sandbox	Cypronia	Cypronia	TBA	TBA	TBA		
Cubot: The Complexity of Simplicity	Puzzle	NicoplvGames	NicoplvGames	Unreleased	Jan 8, 2016	Jan 8, 2016		
The Culling	Action; battle royale	Xaviant	Xaviant	Unreleased	Oct 5, 2017	Oct 5, 2017		
The Culling 2	Action; battle royale	Xaviant	Xaviant	Unreleased	Jul 10, 2018	Jul 10, 2018		
Cult of the Lamb	Roguelite	Massive Monster	Devolver Digital	Aug 11, 2022	Aug 11, 2022	Aug 11, 2022		
Cuphead	Run-and-gun	Studio MDHR	Studio MDHR	Sep 29, 2017	Sep 29, 2017	Sep 29, 2017	PA	
Curious Expedition	Strategy; roguelike	Macshinen-Mensch	Thunderful Publishing	Apr 3, 2020	Apr 3, 2020	Apr 3, 2020		
Curse of the Dead Gods	Action role-playing; roguelike	Passtech Games	Focus Home Interactive	Unreleased	Feb 23, 2021	Feb 23, 2021		
Cybarian: The Time Travelling Warrior	Action-platformer, Retro	Ritual Games	Ratalaika Games	Jun 19, 2019	Jun 19, 2019	Jun 19, 2019		
Cyber Citizen Shockman	Platformer; Hack and slash	Shinyuden	Ratalaika Games	May 18, 2023	May 18, 2023	May 18, 2023		
Cyber Citizen Shockman 3: The Princess from Another World	Platformer; Hack and slash	Shinyuden	Ratalaika Games	May 3, 2024	May 3, 2024	May 3, 2024		
Cyber Complex	Strategy, Tower-defense	Polarity Flow	Polarity Flow	Unreleased	Jul 27, 2017	Jul 27, 2017		
Cyberpunk 2077	Action role-playing	CD Projekt Red	CD Projekt Red	Dec 10, 2020	Dec 10, 2020	Dec 10, 2020		
Cyber Tank	Puzzle	Rapid Snail	Xitilon	Oct 20, 2023	Oct 20, 2023	Oct 20, 2023		
D/Generation HD	Action-adventure	West Coast Software	West Coast Software	Feb 12, 2016	Feb 12, 2016	Feb 12, 2016		
D4: Dark Dreams Don't Die	Action-adventure; mystery	Access Games	Xbox Game Studios	Sep 19, 2014	Sep 19, 2014	Sep 19, 2014		
Dad Beat Dads	Action-adventure	Stellar Jay Studios	Stellar Jay Studios	Unreleased	Feb 5, 2016	Feb 5, 2016		
Daggerhood	Platformer	Woblyware	Ratalaika Games	Feb 20, 2019	Feb 20, 2019	Feb 20, 2019		
Dakar 18	Racing	Bigmoon Entertainment	Deep Silver	Unreleased	Sep 11, 2018	Sep 11, 2018		
Damsel	Action platformer	Screwtape Studios	Screwtape Studios	Aug 7, 2019	Aug 7, 2019	Aug 7, 2019		
Dance Central Spotlight	Rhythm; motion controlled	Harmonix	Xbox Game Studios	Sep 4, 2014	Sep 2, 2014	Sep 2, 2014	K	
Dandara	Platformer	Long Hat House	Raw Fury	Unreleased	Feb 6, 2018	Feb 6, 2018		
Dandy Ace	Roguelite	Mad Mimic	NEOWIZ	Sep 28, 2021	Sep 28, 2021	Sep 28, 2021		
Danger Zone	Racing	Three Fields Entertainment	Three Fields Entertainment	Unreleased	Oct 10, 2017	Oct 10, 2017	X	
Danger Zone 2	Racing	Three Fields Entertainment	Three Fields Entertainment	Unreleased	Jul 13, 2018	Jul 13, 2018	X	
Dangerous Driving	Racing	Three Fields Entertainment	Three Fields Entertainment	Apr 9, 2019	Apr 9, 2019	Apr 9, 2019	X	
Dangerous Golf	Sports	Three Fields Entertainment	Three Fields Entertainment	Unreleased	Jun 3, 2016	Jun 3, 2016		
Dangun Feveron	Scrolling shoot 'em up	M2	M2	Apr 3, 2018	Apr 3, 2018	Apr 3, 2018		
Dark Arcana: The Carnival	Point & Click	Artifex Mundi	Artifex Mundi	Unreleased	Mar 17, 2017	Mar 17, 2017		
The Dark Crystal: Age of Resistance Tactics	Tactical role-playing, strategy	BonusXP	En Masse Entertainment	Feb 4, 2020	Feb 4, 2020	Feb 4, 2020		
The Dark Pictures Anthology: House of Ashes	Horror	Supermassive Games	Bandai Namco Entertainment	Unreleased	Oct 22, 2021	Oct 22, 2021		
The Dark Pictures Anthology: Man of Medan	Horror	Supermassive Games	Bandai Namco Entertainment	Aug 29, 2019	Aug 30, 2019	Aug 29, 2019	X	
The Dark Pictures Anthology: Little Hope	Horror	Supermassive Games	Bandai Namco Entertainment	Oct 30, 2020	Oct 30, 2020	Oct 30, 2020	X	
Dark Quest 2	Tactical Role-playing	Brain Seal	Brain Seal	Feb 7, 2019	Feb 8, 2019	Feb 8, 2019		
Dark Souls Remastered	Action role-playing, hack and slash	From Software	Bandai Namco Entertainment	May 24, 2018	May 25, 2018	May 25, 2018		
Dark Souls II: Scholar of the First Sin	Action role-playing, hack and slash	From Software	Bandai Namco Entertainment	Apr 9, 2015	Apr 7, 2015	Apr 2, 2015		
Dark Souls III	Action role-playing, hack and slash	From Software	Bandai Namco Entertainment	Mar 24, 2016	Apr 12, 2016	Apr 12, 2016		
Darkest Dungeon	Turn-based strategy	Red Hook Studios	Red Hook Studios	Unreleased	Feb 28, 2018	Feb 28, 2018		
Darksiders: Warmastered Edition	Action role-playing, hack and slash	Gunfire Games	THQ Nordic	Unreleased	Nov 22, 2016	Nov 22, 2016		
Darksiders II: Deathinitive Edition	Action role-playing, hack and slash	Gunfire Games	THQ Nordic	Unreleased	Oct 27, 2015	Oct 27, 2015		
Darksiders Genesis	Action role-playing	Airship Syndicate	THQ Nordic	Unreleased	Feb 14, 2020	Feb 14, 2020	X	
Darksiders III	Action role-playing, hack and slash	Gunfire Games	THQ Nordic	Unreleased	Nov 27, 2018	Nov 27, 2018		
Darkwood	Survival horror	Acid Wizard Studio	Crunching Koalas	May 17, 2019	May 17, 2019	May 17, 2019		
DARQ: Complete Edition	Psychological horror	Unfold Games	Feardemic	Unreleased	Dec 4, 2020	Dec 4, 2020		
Dawn of the Monsters	Beat 'em up	13AM Games	WayForward	Mar 15, 2022	Mar 15, 2022	Mar 15, 2022		
DayD: Through Time	Strategy, Time management	Creobit	8floor Games	Unreleased	Jan 30, 2019	Jan 30, 2019		
DayZ	Open world, multiplayer survival	Bohemia Interactive	Bohemia Interactive	Unreleased	Mar 27, 2019	Mar 27, 2019	X	
DCL: The Game	Simulation, racing	Drone Champions; Climax Studios	THQ Nordic	Feb 18, 2020	Feb 18, 2020	Feb 18, 2020	X	
De Blob	Platform, Puzzle	BlitWorks	THQ Nordic	Unreleased	Nov 17, 2017	Nov 17, 2017		
De Blob 2	Platform, Puzzle	BlitWorks	THQ Nordic	Unreleased	Feb 27, 2018	Feb 27, 2018		
Dead Age	Survival, tactical role-playing	Silent Dreams	Headup Games	Unreleased	Sep 7, 2018	Sep 7, 2018		
Dead Ahead: Zombie Warfare	Survival	Mobirate	Mobirate	Unreleased	Apr 6, 2018	Apr 6, 2018		
Dead Alliance	First-person shooter	IllFonic; Psyop	Maximum Games	Unreleased	Aug 29, 2017	Aug 29, 2017		
Dead Alliance: Multiplayer Edition	First-person shooter	IllFonic; Psyop	Maximum Games	Unreleased	Aug 29, 2017	Aug 29, 2017		
Dead Cells	Side-Scrolling Hack and slash Roguelike	Motion Twin	Motion Twin	Aug 7, 2018	Aug 7, 2018	Aug 7, 2018		
Dead by Daylight	Asymmetrical multiplayer horror	Behavior Interactive	Starbreeze Studios	Unreleased	Jun 20, 2017	Jun 20, 2017		
Deadcraft	Survival	Marvelous First Studio	JP: Marvelous; WW: Xseed Games	May 19, 2022	May 19, 2022	May 19, 2022		
Dead Effect 2	Shooter	BadFly Interactive	BadFly Interactive	Unreleased	Jan 13, 2017	Jan 13, 2017		
Dead End Job	Twin-stick shooter	Ant Workshop	Headup Games	Unreleased	Dec 13, 2019	Dec 13, 2019		
Dead Exit	Strategy, Deck Building	RadiationBurn	RadiationBurn	Unreleased	Oct 31, 2017	Oct 31, 2017		
Dead Island: Definitive Edition	Action role-playing; survival horror	Techland	Deep Silver	Unreleased	May 31, 2016	May 31, 2016		
Dead Island: Retro Revenge	Fighting	Empty Clip	Deep Silver	Unreleased	Aug 1, 2016	Aug 1, 2016		
Dead Island: Riptide Definitive Edition	Action-adventure, first-person survival horror	Techland	Deep Silver	Unreleased	May 31, 2016	May 31, 2016		
Dead Island 2	Action-adventure, first-person survival horror	Sumo Digital	Deep Silver	Unreleased	Feb 3, 2023	Feb 3, 2023		
Dead or Alive 5: Last Round	Fighting	Team Ninja	Koei Tecmo	Feb 19, 2015	Feb 17, 2015	Feb 20, 2015		
Dead or Alive 6	Fighting	Koei Tecmo	Koei Tecmo	Mar 1, 2019	Mar 1, 2019	Mar 1, 2019		
Dead Rising	Survival horror	Capcom	Capcom	Sep 12, 2016	Sep 12, 2016	Sep 12, 2016		
Dead Rising 2	Survival horror	Capcom	Capcom	Sep 12, 2016	Sep 12, 2016	Sep 12, 2016		
Dead Rising 2: Off the Record	Survival horror	Capcom	Capcom	Sep 12, 2016	Sep 12, 2016	Sep 12, 2016		
Dead Rising 3	Survival horror	Capcom Vancouver	Xbox Game Studios	Sep 4, 2014	Nov 22, 2013	Nov 22, 2013		
Dead Rising 4	Survival horror	Capcom Vancouver	Xbox Game Studios	Dec 6, 2016	Dec 6, 2016	Dec 6, 2016	X	
Deadbeat Heroes	Action	Deadbeat Productions	Square Enix Collective	Unreleased	Oct 10, 2017	Oct 10, 2017		
Deadcore	Platformer, Parkour	5 Bits Games	Grip Digital	Unreleased	Jul 14, 2017	Jul 14, 2017		
Deadlight: Director's Cut	Action & Adventure	Tequila Works; Abstraction Games	Deep Silver	Unreleased	Jun 21, 2016	Jun 21, 2016		
Deadpool	Action & Adventure	High Moon Studios	Activision	Unreleased	Nov 17, 2015	Nov 20, 2015		
Dear Esther: Landmark Edition	Adventure, walking simulator	The Chinese Room	Curve Digital	Unreleased	Sep 19, 2016	Sep 19, 2016		
Death Crown	Real-time strategy	Co5monaut; Stas Pisarev	Co5monaut	Unreleased	May 13, 2021	May 13, 2021		
Death God University	Action & Adventure, Puzzle	DSK Green Ice Games	DSK Green Ice Games	Unreleased	Oct 13, 2016	Oct 13, 2016		
Death Squared	Puzzle	SMG Studios	SMG Studios	Unreleased	Mar 14, 2017	Mar 14, 2017		
Death's Door	Action-adventure	Acid Nerve	Devolver Digital	Jul 20, 2021	Jul 20, 2021	Jul 20, 2021		
Debris	Action-adventure	Moonray Studios	Moonray Studios	Nov 22, 2019	Nov 22, 2019	Nov 22, 2019		
Debris Infinity	Twin-stick shooter	SVC Games	SVC Games	Oct 11, 2019	Oct 11, 2019	Oct 11, 2019	X	
Decay	Horror, Puzzle	Shining Gate Software	Shining Gate Software	Jul 26, 2019	Jul 26, 2019	Jul 26, 2019		
Decay: The Mare	Horror, Puzzle	Shining Gate Software	Shining Gate Software	Unreleased	Oct 12, 2017	Oct 12, 2017		
Decay of Logos	Action-adventure	Amplify Creations	Rising Star Games	Aug 30, 2019	Aug 30, 2019	Aug 30, 2019		
Deep Ones	Platformer	Burp! Games	Sometimes You	Dec 7, 2018	Apr 11, 2018	Apr 11, 2018		
Deep Rock Galactic	Shooter, Adventure	Ghost Ship Games	Coffee Stain Publishing	Unreleased	May 13, 2020	May 13, 2020	PA	
Deep Sky Derelicts: Definitive Edition	Role-playing	Snowhound Games	1C Company	Unreleased	Mar 24, 2020	Mar 24, 2020		
Deep Space Rush	Run & gun	Bug-Studios	Ratalaika Games	Oct 23, 2019	Oct 23, 2019	Oct 23, 2019		
The Deer God	Platformer	Crescent Moon Games	Crescent Moon Games	Sep 1, 2015	Sep 1, 2015	Sep 1, 2015		
Deer Hunter Reloaded	Simulation, Sport	GameMill Entertainment	GameMill Entertainment	Unreleased	Oct 24, 2017	Oct 24, 2017		
Defenders of Ekron: Definitive Edition	Shoot 'em up	In Vitro Games	In Vitro Games	Unreleased	Aug 7, 2018	Aug 7, 2018		
Deformers	MOBA	Ready at Dawn	Ready at Dawn	Unreleased	Apr 11, 2017	Apr 11, 2017	PC	
Defender's Quest: Valley of the Forgotten DX	Tower-defense, Role-playing	Level Up Labs	Level Up Labs	Unreleased	Feb 21, 2018	Feb 21, 2018		
Defense Grid 2	Tower defense	Hidden Path Entertainment	505 Games	Unreleased	Sep 23, 2014	Sep 23, 2014		
Defunct	Action & Adventure	Soedesco	Soedesco	Dec 19, 2017	Dec 19, 2017	Dec 19, 2017	PA	
Degrees of Separation	Puzzle platformer	Moondrop	Modus Games	Feb 14, 2019	Feb 14, 2019	Feb 14, 2019		
Deliver Us the Moon	Adventure	KeokeN Interactive	KeokeN Interactive	Apr 23, 2020	Apr 24, 2020	Apr 24, 2020		
Delta Squad	To-down shooter	Eskema Games	Ratalaika Games	Oct 30, 2019	Oct 30, 2019	Oct 30, 2019		
Demetrios: The Big Cynical Adventure	Adventure, Point & Click	CowCat	CowCat	Unreleased	Aug 2, 2017	Aug 2, 2017		
Demon Pit	Wave shooter	Psychic Software; Doomcube; Stage Clear Studios	Digerati	Dec 24, 2019	Dec 24, 2019	Dec 24, 2019	X	
Demons Age	Role-playing	Bigmoon Entertainment	Bigmoon Entertainment	Unreleased	Dec 7, 2017	Dec 7, 2017		
Demon's Crystals	Shooter	Byte4Games	BadLand Games	Unreleased	May 12, 2017	May 12, 2017		
Demon's Tilt	Arcade, pinball	Wiznwar; Flarb	Flarb	Dec 6, 2019	Dec 6, 2019	Dec 6, 2019	PA	
Demons with Shotguns	Platform brawler, party game	Stage Clear Studios; Mindshaft Games	Digerati	Dec 24, 2019	Dec 24, 2019	Dec 24, 2019		
Demon Slayer: Kimetsu no Yaiba – The Hinokami Chronicles	Fighting	CyberConnect2	JP: Aniplex; WW: Sega	Oct 14, 2021	Oct 15, 2021	Oct 15, 2021		
Deployment	Arena shooter	Whale Rock Games	Whale Rock Games	Unreleased	Oct 10, 2018	Oct 10, 2018		
Deponia	Point-and-click adventure	Daedalic Entertainment	Daedalic Entertainment	Apr 24, 2019	Apr 24, 2019	Apr 24, 2019		
Deponia Doomsday	Point-and-click adventure	Daedalic Entertainment	Daedalic Entertainment	Feb 14, 2019	Feb 14, 2019	Feb 14, 2019		
Depth of Extinction	Roguelike tactical RPG	HOF Studios	HOF Studios	Jun 2, 2020	Jun 3, 2020	Jun 2, 2020	X	
Descenders	Racing	RageSquid	No More Robots, Fireshine Games	May 7, 2019	May 7, 2019	May 7, 2019		
Desert Child	Racing adventure	Oscar Brittain	Akupara Games	Dec 12, 2018	Dec 12, 2018	Dec 12, 2018		
Desperados 3	Real-time strategy	Mimimi Productions	THQ Nordic	Jun 16, 2020	Jun 16, 2020	Jun 16, 2020		
Destiny	Action role-playing; first-person shooter	Bungie	Activision	Unreleased	Sep 9, 2014	Sep 9, 2014		
Destiny 2	Action role-playing; first-person shooter	Bungie	Activision	Sep 6, 2017	Sep 6, 2017	Sep 6, 2017	X	
Deus Ex: Mankind Divided	Action role-playing; stealth	Eidos Montréal	Square Enix	Apr 6, 2017	Aug 23, 2016	Aug 23, 2016		
Devil May Cry 4: Special Edition	Hack and slash; action	Capcom	Capcom	Jun 18, 2015	Jun 23, 2015	Jun 18, 2015		
Devil May Cry 5	Hack and slash; action	Capcom	Capcom	Mar 8, 2019	Mar 8, 2019	Mar 8, 2019		
Devil May Cry HD Collection	Hack and slash; action	Capcom	Capcom	Mar 13, 2018	Mar 13, 2018	Mar 13, 2018		
Devious Dungeon	Action-platformer	Woblyware; Ravenous Games	Ratalaika Games	Unreleased	Oct 10, 2018	Oct 10, 2018		
Devious Dungeon 2	Roguelike action-platformer	Woblyware	Ratalaika Games	Unreleased	May 15, 2019	May 15, 2019		
Dex	Action & Adventure	Dreadlocks	BadLand Games	Unreleased	Jul 8, 2016	Jul 8, 2016		
Diablo II: Resurrected	Action role-playing, hack and slash	Vicarious Visions	Blizzard Entertainment	Sep 23, 2021	Sep 23, 2021	Sep 23, 2021		
Diablo III: Ultimate Evil Edition	Action role-playing, dungeon crawl, hack and slash	Blizzard Entertainment	Blizzard Entertainment	Unreleased	Aug 19, 2014	Aug 19, 2014	X	
Die for Valhalla!	Hack and slash	Monster Couch	Monster Couch	Unreleased	May 30, 2018	May 30, 2018		
Digimon Survive	Visual novel; Role-playing	HYDE	Bandai Namco Entertainment	Jul 28, 2022	Jul 29, 2022	Jul 29, 2022		
Dimension Drive	Shoot 'em up	2Awesome Studio	LBC Games	Sep 4, 2018	Sep 4, 2018	Sep 4, 2018		
Dirt 4	Racing	Codemasters	Codemasters	Jul 26, 2017	Jun 9, 2017	Jun 9, 2017		
Dirt 5	Racing	Codemasters	Codemasters	Nov 6, 2020	Nov 6, 2020	Nov 6, 2020		
Dirt Rally	Racing	Codemasters	Codemasters	Unreleased	Apr 5, 2016	Apr 5, 2016		
Dirt Rally 2.0	Racing	Codemasters	Codemasters	Apr 18, 2019	Feb 26, 2019	Feb 26, 2019	X	
Disciples: Liberation	Turn-based strategy	Frima Studio	Kalypso Media	Oct 21, 2021	Oct 21, 2021	Oct 21, 2021		
Disco Dodgeball Remix	Shooter, Sports	Zen Studios	Zen Studios	Unreleased	May 22, 2018	May 22, 2018		
Dishonored 2	Action	Arkane Studios	Bethesda Softworks	Nov 11, 2016	Nov 11, 2016	Nov 11, 2016	X	
Dishonored: Death of the Outsider	Action	Arkane Studios	Bethesda Softworks	Sep 15, 2017	Sep 15, 2017	Sep 15, 2017	X	
Dishonored: Definitive Edition	Action	Arkane Studios	Bethesda Softworks	Aug 27, 2015	Aug 25, 2015	Aug 28, 2015	FPSB	
Disintegration	First-person shooter	V1 Interactive	Private Division	Jun 16, 2020	Jun 16, 2020	Jun 16, 2020		
The Disney Afternoon Collection	Retro collection	Digital Eclipse	Capcom	Unreleased	Apr 18, 2017	Apr 18, 2017		
Disney Classic Games: Aladdin and The Lion King	Retro collection	Digital Eclipse	Disney	Unreleased	Oct 29, 2019	Oct 28, 2019		
Disney Dreamlight Valley	Life simulation, adventure	Gameloft Montreal	Gameloft	Dec 5, 2023	Dec 5, 2023	Dec 5, 2023		
Disney Infinity: Marvel Super Heroes	Action-adventure	Avalanche Software	Disney Interactive Studios	Unreleased	Sep 23, 2014	Sep 19, 2014		
Disney Infinity 3.0	Action-adventure	Avalanche Software	Disney Interactive Studios	Unreleased	Aug 30, 2015	Aug 28, 2015		
Disney Speedstorm	Kart racing	Gameloft Barcelona	Gameloft	Sep 28, 2023	Sep 28, 2023	Sep 28, 2023		
Disneyland Adventures Remastered	Open World, Adventure	Asobo Studio	Xbox Game Studios	Oct 31, 2017	Oct 31, 2017	Oct 31, 2017	PA X K	
Distraint: Deluxe Edition	Horror	Ratalaika Games	Jesse Makkonen	Sep 11, 2019	Sep 11, 2019	Sep 11, 2019		
Distrust	Survival Roguelite	Alawar Entertainment	E-Home Entertainment	Aug 24, 2018	Aug 24, 2018	Aug 24, 2018		
Divekick: Addition Edition +	Fighting	One True Game Studios; Iron Galaxy Studios	Iron Galaxy Studios	Unreleased	Oct 7, 2014	Oct 7, 2014		
Divinity: Original Sin Enhanced Edition	Role-playing	Larian Studios	Focus Home Interactive	Unreleased	Oct 27, 2015	Oct 27, 2015		
Divinity: Original Sin II Definitive Edition	Role-playing	Larian Studios	Larian Studios	Unreleased	Aug 31, 2018	Aug 31, 2018	X	
DJMax Respect V	Rhythm	Neowiz MUCA	Neowiz Games	Jul 7, 2022	Jul 7, 2022	Jul 7, 2022	PA PC	
DmC: Devil May Cry Definitive Edition	Hack and slash, action	Ninja Theory	Capcom	Unreleased	Apr 10, 2015	Apr 10, 2015		
Doctor Who: The Edge of Reality	Adventure	Maze Theory	BBC Studios; Just Add Water	Unreleased	Sep 30, 2021	Sep 30, 2021		
Dodgeball Academia	Sports; role-playing	Pocket Trap	Humble Games	Aug 5, 2021	Aug 5, 2021	Aug 5, 2021		
Dogos	Shooter	Opqam	Opqam	Dec 15, 2016	Sep 6, 2016	Sep 6, 2016		
Doki Doki Literature Club Plus!	Visual novel	Team Salvato	Serenity Forge	Unreleased	Jun 30, 2021	Jun 30, 2021		
Don Bradman Cricket 14	Sports	Big Ant Studios	Home Entertainment Suppliers	Unreleased	Feb 11, 2015	Feb 11, 2015		
Don Bradman Cricket 17	Sports	Big Ant Studios	Home Entertainment Suppliers	Unreleased	Dec 14, 2016	Dec 14, 2016		
Don't Knock Twice	Horror	Wales Interactive	Wales Interactive	Unreleased	Sep 5, 2017	Sep 5, 2017		
Don't Sink	Roguelite Pirate role-playing	Studio Eris	Studio Eris	Unreleased	Aug 24, 2018	Aug 24, 2018		
Don't Starve: Giant Edition	Action-adventure	Klei Entertainment; BlitWorks	Klei Entertainment	Unreleased	Aug 26, 2015	Aug 26, 2015		
Don't Starve Together: Console Edition	Action-adventure	Klei Entertainment; BlitWorks	Klei Entertainment	Unreleased	Sep 13, 2017	Sep 13, 2017		
Donut County	Physics puzzler	Ben Esposito	Annapurna Interactive	Apr 30, 2020	Dec 18, 2018	Dec 18, 2018		
Doodle God: Crime City	Puzzle	JoyBits	JoyBits	Unreleased	Nov 8, 2018	Nov 8, 2018	X	
Doodle God: Evolution	Puzzle	JoyBits	JoyBits	Jun 13, 2019	Jun 13, 2019	Jun 13, 2019		
Doodle God: Ultimate Edition	Puzzle	JoyBits	JoyBits	Unreleased	Jan 27, 2017	Jan 27, 2017		
Doom	First-person shooter	id Software	Bethesda Softworks	Jul 26, 2019	Jul 26, 2019	Jul 26, 2019		
Doom	First-person shooter	id Software	Bethesda Softworks	May 13, 2016	May 13, 2016	May 13, 2016	X	
Doom 64	First-person shooter	Nightdive Studios	Bethesda Softworks	Mar 25, 2020	Mar 20, 2020	Mar 19, 2020		
Doom II	First-person shooter	id Software	Bethesda Softworks	Jul 26, 2019	Jul 26, 2019	Jul 26, 2019		
Doom 3	First-person shooter	id Software; Panic Button	Bethesda Softworks	Jul 26, 2019	Jul 26, 2019	Jul 26, 2019	X	
Doom and Destiny	Japanese role-playing	Heartbit Interactive	Heartbit Interactive	Dec 12, 2018	Dec 12, 2018	Dec 12, 2018		
Doom Eternal	First-person shooter	id Software	Bethesda Softworks	Mar 20, 2020	Mar 20, 2020	Mar 20, 2020		
Door Kickers: Action Squad	Side-scrolling shooter	PixelShard	Killhouse Games	Oct 23, 2019	Oct 23, 2019	Oct 23, 2019		
Double Cross	Platformer	13AM Games	Graffiti Games	Unreleased	Jun 19, 2019	Jun 19, 2019		
Double Dragon 4	Brawler	Arc System Works	Arc System Works	Apr 23, 2020	Apr 23, 2020	Apr 23, 2020		
Double Dragon Revive	Beat 'em up	Yuke's	Arc System Works	Oct 23, 2025	Oct 23, 2025	Oct 23, 2025		
Double Dragon Gaiden: Rise of the Dragons	Beat 'em up; Roguelike	Secret Base	Modus Games	Jul 27, 2023	Jul 27, 2023	Jul 27, 2023		
Doug Flutie's Maximum Football 2019	Sports	Canuck Play	Canuck Play	Unreleased	Sep 27, 2019	Sep 27, 2019		
Doughlings: Arcade	Arcade	Hero Concept	Hero Concept	Aug 16, 2018	Aug 3, 2018	Aug 3, 2018		
Doughlings: Invaders	Shoot em up, Retro	Hero Concept	Hero Concept	Jul 10, 2019	Jul 10, 2019	Jul 10, 2019		
Dovetail Games Euro Fishing	Simulation	Dovetail Games	Dovetail Games	Unreleased	Jun 10, 2016	Jun 10, 2016		
DragoDino	Adventure	TealRocksStudio	Plug In Digital	Unreleased	Apr 27, 2018	Apr 27, 2018		
Dragon Age: Inquisition	Action role-playing	BioWare	Electronic Arts	Nov 18, 2014	Nov 18, 2014	Nov 18, 2014		
Dragon Ball FighterZ	Fighting	Arc System Works	Bandai Namco Entertainment	Feb 1, 2018	Jan 26, 2018	Jan 26, 2018	X	
Dragon Ball: The Breakers	Survival	Dimps	Bandai Namco Entertainment	2022	2022	2022		
Dragon Ball Xenoverse	Fighting	Dimps	Bandai Namco Entertainment	Feb 5, 2015	Feb 24, 2015	Feb 27, 2015		
Dragon Ball Xenoverse 2	Fighting	Dimps	Bandai Namco Entertainment	Nov 2, 2016	Oct 25, 2016	Oct 28, 2016		
Dragon Ball Z: Kakarot	Action role-playing	CyberConnect2	Bandai Namco Entertainment	Jan 16, 2020	Jan 17, 2020	Jan 17, 2020		
Dragon Bros	Platform; shooter	Space Lizard Studio	Space Lizard Studio	Unreleased	May 31, 2017	May 31, 2017		
Dragon Quest Builders 2	Action role-playing	Square Enix	Square Enix	May 4, 2021	May 4, 2021	May 4, 2021		
Dragon Quest XI S: Echoes of an Elusive Age	Role-playing	Square Enix	Square Enix	Dec 4, 2020	Dec 4, 2020	Dec 4, 2020		
Dragon Sinker: Descendants of Legend	Role-playing	Exe Create	Kemco	Jan 8, 2020	Jan 8, 2020	Jan 8, 2020	PA	
Dragon's Lair Trilogy	Retro collection	Digital Leisure	Digital Leisure	Unreleased	May 17, 2019	May 17, 2019		
DragonFang Z: The Rose & Dungeon of Time	Roguelike role-playing game	Toydea	Toydea	May 10, 2019	May 10, 2019	May 10, 2019	PA	
Dragon's Dogma: Dark Arisen	Action role-playing, hack and slash	Capcom	Capcom	Oct 5, 2017	Oct 3, 2017	Oct 3, 2017		
Draugen	Adventure, walking simulator	Red Thread Games	Red Thread Games	Feb 21, 2020	Feb 21, 2020	Feb 21, 2020	X	
Drake Hollow	Action-adventure	The Molasses Flood	The Molasses Flood	Unreleased	Aug 28, 2020	Aug 28, 2020		
Draw a Stickman: Epic	Adventure, Casual	Hitcents	Hitcents	Unreleased	Sep 11, 2015	Sep 11, 2015		
Draw a Stickman: Epic 2	Adventure, Casual	Hitcents	Hitcents	Unreleased	Oct 9, 2019	Oct 9, 2019		
Drawful 2	Party, trivia	Jackbox Games	Jackbox Games	Unreleased	Jun 21, 2016	Jun 21, 2016		
Dread Nautical	Tactical horror roguelike	Zen Studios	Zen Studios	Apr 29, 2020	Apr 29, 2020	Apr 29, 2020	X	
Dreamals: Dream Quest	Platformer; puzzle	Xiness	Xiness	Unreleased	Aug 3, 2016	Aug 3, 2016		
DreamBreak	Action & Adventure	Aist; SPL	Digerati	Unreleased	Sep 14, 2017	Sep 14, 2017		
Dreamfall Chapters: The Longest Journey	Adventure	Red Thread Games	Deep Silver	Unreleased	May 5, 2017	May 5, 2017		
Dreaming Sarah	Adventure Platformer	Asteristic Game Studio	Asteristic Game Studio	Aug 16, 2017	Aug 16, 2017	Aug 16, 2017		
Dreamwalker: Never Fall Asleep	Hidden object adventure	The House of Fables	Artifex Mundi	Dec 12, 2019	Dec 12, 2019	Dec 12, 2019	X	
DreamWorks Dragons: Dawn of New Riders	Action-adventure, Family	Climax Studios	Outright Games	Unreleased	Feb 15, 2019	Feb 1, 2019		
Drift Zone	Racing	Awesome Industries	Awesome Industries	Unreleased	Jan 26, 2018	Jan 26, 2018		
Drive On Moscow	Strategy	Shenandoah Studio	Slitherine Software	Unreleased	May 4, 2018	May 4, 2018		
Driven Out	Side-scrolling action	No Pest Productions	No Pest Productions	Oct 18, 2019	Oct 18, 2019	Oct 18, 2019		
Dual Gear	Turn-based strategy	Orbital Speed Studio	Orbital Speed Studio	Unreleased	TBA	TBA		
Ducati: 90th Anniversary	Racing	Milestone srl	Milestone srl	Unreleased	Jun 9, 2016	Jun 9, 2016		
Duck Dynasty	Shooter	Fun Labs	Activision	Unreleased	Oct 14, 2014	Oct 21, 2014		
Duck Life: Battle	Role-playing	Wix Games	Mad	Unreleased	Oct 14, 2014	Oct 21, 2014	X	
Duck Souls	Platformer	Green Dinosaur Games	Ratalaika Games	Mar 25, 2020	Mar 25, 2020	Mar 25, 2020		
Duke Nukem 3D: 20th Anniversary World Tour	Shooter	Gearbox Software	Gearbox Publishing	Unreleased	Oct 10, 2016	Oct 10, 2016		
Dungeon of the Endless	Adventure	Amplitude Studios	Amplitude Studios	Unreleased	Mar 16, 2016	Mar 16, 2016		
Dungeon Punks	Action role-playing	Hyper Awesome Entertainment	Hyper Awesome Entertainment	Unreleased	Jul 26, 2016	Jul 26, 2016		
Dungeons 3	Strategy, simulation	Realmforge Studios	Kalypso Media	Unreleased	Oct 17, 2017	Oct 17, 2017		
Dunk Lords	Sports, Fighting	Story Fort	Story Fort	Unreleased	TBA	TBA		
Dustoff Heli Rescue 2	Strategy, Simulation	Invictus Games	Invictus Games	Unreleased	Dec 26, 2017	Dec 26, 2017		
The Dwarves	Tactical role-playing	King Art Games	THQ Nordic	Unreleased	Dec 2, 2016	Dec 2, 2016		
Dye	Platformer	Bat Country Games	Bat Country Games	Unreleased	Feb 7, 2018	Feb 7, 2018		
Dying: 1983	Adventure	Nekcom	2P Games	TBA	TBA	TBA		
Dying Light	Action role-playing; survival horror	Techland	Warner Bros. Interactive Entertainment	Apr 16, 2015	Jan 27, 2015	Feb 27, 2015		
Dying Light 2	Action role-playing; survival horror	Techland	Square Enix	Dec 7, 2021	Dec 7, 2021	Dec 7, 2021		
Dying: Reborn	Puzzle	Nekcom Entertainment	E-Home Entertainment	Unreleased	Oct 31, 2017	Oct 31, 2017		
Dynamite Fishing: World Games	Puzzle	HandyGames	HandyGames	Unreleased	Jul 1, 2016	Jul 1, 2016		
Dynasty Warriors 8: Empires	Hack and slash	Omega Force	Koei Tecmo	Oct 8, 2014	Feb 24, 2015	Feb 27, 2015		
Dynasty Warriors 9	Hack and slash	Omega Force	Koei Tecmo	Unreleased	Feb 13, 2018	Feb 13, 2018	X	
Dynasty Warriors 9: Empires	Hack and slash	Omega Force	Koei Tecmo	Dec 23, 2021	Feb 15, 2022	Feb 15, 2022		
EA Sports FC 24	Sports	EA Vancouver	Electronic Arts	Sep 29, 2023	Sep 29, 2023	Sep 29, 2023		
EA Sports FC 25	Sports	EA Vancouver	Electronic Arts	Sep 27, 2024	Sep 27, 2024	Sep 27, 2024		
EA Sports FC 26	Sports	EA Vancouver	Electronic Arts	Sep 26, 2025	Sep 26, 2025	Sep 26, 2025		
EA Sports UFC	Fighting, Sports	EA Canada	EA Sports	Jun 20, 2014	Nov 20, 2014	Jun 17, 2014		
EA Sports UFC 2	Fighting, Sports	EA Canada	EA Sports	Mar 15, 2016	Mar 15, 2016	Mar 15, 2016		
EA Sports UFC 3	Fighting, Sports	EA Canada	EA Sports	Feb 2, 2018	Feb 2, 2018	Feb 2, 2018		
EA Sports UFC 4	Fighting, Sports	EA Canada	EA Sports	Aug 14, 2020	Aug 14, 2020	Aug 14, 2020		
Earth Atlantis	Shoot 'em up	Pixel Perfex	Headup Games	Unreleased	Jun 1, 2018	Jun 1, 2018		
Earthfall	Action, Shooter	Holospark Games	Holospark Games	Jul 13, 2018	Jul 13, 2018	Jul 13, 2018		
Earthlock: Festival of Magic	Role-playing	Snowcastle Games	Snowcastle Games	Sep 1, 2016	Sep 1, 2016	Sep 1, 2016		
Earth Wars	Action	OneorEight	Rising Star Games	Sep 18, 2015	Nov 1, 2016	Nov 1, 2016		
Eastshade	Adventure	Eastshade Studios	Eastshade Studios	Oct 20, 2019	Oct 21, 2019	Oct 21, 2019		
Echoes of the Fey: The Fox's Trail	Adventure	Woodsy Studio	Woodsy Studio	Aug 31, 2017	Aug 31, 2017	Aug 31, 2017		
Edgar: Bokbok in Boulzac	Adventure, point & click	La Poule Noire	La Poule Noire	Unreleased	Feb 26, 2020	Feb 26, 2020		
Edna & Harvey: Harvey's New Eyes	Point & click adventure	Daedalic Entertainment	Daedalic Entertainment	Aug 14, 2019	Aug 14, 2019	Aug 14, 2019		
Edna & Harvey: The Breakout	Point & click adventure	Daedalic Entertainment	Daedalic Entertainment	Jun 17, 2020	Jun 17, 2020	Jun 17, 2020		
Eekeemoo: Splinters of the Dark Shard	Platform, Puzzle	Cogg Games	Cogg Games	Mar 3, 2017	Mar 3, 2017	Mar 3, 2017		
eFootball Pro Evolution Soccer 2020	Sports	Konami	Konami	Unreleased	Sep 10, 2019	Sep 9, 2019	X	
Eiyuden Chronicle: Hundred Heroes	Role-playing	Rabbit & Bear Studios	505 Games	Apr 24, 2024	Apr 24, 2024	Apr 24, 2024		
Eiyuden Chronicle: Rising	Role-playing	Rabbit & Bear Studios	505 Games	May 10, 2022	May 10, 2022	May 10, 2022		
Elden Ring	Action role-playing	FromSoftware	Bandai Namco Entertainment	Feb 25, 2022	Feb 25, 2022	Feb 25, 2022		
The Elder Scrolls V: Skyrim - Special Edition	Action role-playing	Bethesda Game Studios	Bethesda Softworks	Oct 28, 2016	Oct 28, 2016	Oct 28, 2016	X FPSB	
The Elder Scrolls Online	Massively multiplayer online role-playing	ZeniMax Online Studios	Bethesda Softworks	Jun 9, 2015	Jun 9, 2015	Jun 9, 2015	X	
Electronic Super Joy	Platformer	Loot Interactive	Michael Todd Games	Jan 20, 2016	Jan 20, 2016	Jan 20, 2016		
ELEX	Action role-playing	Piranha Bytes	THQ Nordic	Oct 17, 2017	Oct 17, 2017	Oct 17, 2017		
ELEX II	Action role-playing	Piranha Bytes	THQ Nordic	Unreleased	Mar 1, 2022	Mar 1, 2022		
Elderborn	Action	Hyperstrange	Hyperstrange	TBA	TBA	TBA		
Elea	Adventure	Kyodai	Soedesco	Sep 6, 2018	Sep 6, 2018	Sep 6, 2018	X	
Element Space	Tactics, strategy	Sixth Vowel	Blowfish Studios	Mar 23, 2020	Mar 24, 2020	Mar 23, 2020	X	
Elite: Dangerous	Space trading and combat	Frontier Developments	Frontier Developments	Oct 6, 2015	Oct 6, 2015	Oct 6, 2015	X	
Elite Dangerous: Arena	Space trading and combat	Frontier Developments	Frontier Developments	Apr 26, 2016	Apr 26, 2016	Apr 26, 2016		
Ellen: The Game	Horror, Adventure	Red Mount Media	JanduSoft	Sep 13, 2019	Sep 13, 2019	Sep 13, 2019		
Elliot Quest	Platform-adventure, Metroidvania	Ansimuz Games	Ansimuz Games	May 11, 2017	May 11, 2017	May 11, 2017		
Embers of Mirrim	Adventure, Platformer	Creative Bytes	Creative Bytes	May 23, 2017	May 23, 2017	May 23, 2017		
Emily Wants to Play	Survival horror	Shawn Hitchcock	SKH Apps	Sep 9, 2016	Sep 9, 2016	Sep 9, 2016		
Emily Wants to Play Too	Survival horror	SKH Apps	SKH Apps	Apr 25, 2018	Apr 25, 2018	Apr 25, 2018		
Empire of Angels IV	Tactical role-playing	Softstar Entertainment	EastAsiaSoft	Jun 23, 2021	Jun 23, 2021	Jun 23, 2021		
Empire of Sin	Strategy	Romero Games	Paradox Interactive	Dec 1, 2020	Dec 1, 2020	Dec 1, 2020		
Ender Lilies: Quietus of the Knights	Metroidvania	Live Wire; Adglobe	Binary Haze Interactive	Jun 29, 2021	Jun 29, 2021	Jun 29, 2021		
Ender Magnolia: Bloom in the Mist	Metroidvania	Adglobe; Live Wire	Binary Haze Interactive	Jan 22, 2025	Jan 22, 2025	Jan 22, 2025		
Energy Cycle	Puzzle	Sometimes You	Sometimes You	Dec 6, 2016	Dec 6, 2016	Dec 6, 2016		
Energy Cycle Edge	Puzzle	Sometimes You	Sometimes You	Dec 5, 2018	Dec 5, 2018	Dec 5, 2018	X	
Enigmatis: The Ghosts of Maple Creek	Point & Click	Artifex Mundi	Artifex Mundi	Unreleased	Apr 8, 2016	Apr 8, 2016		
Enigmatis 2: The Mists of Ravenwood	Point & Click	Artifex Mundi	Artifex Mundi	Unreleased	Nov 24, 2016	Nov 24, 2016		
Enigmatis 3: The Shadow of Karkhala	Point & Click	Artifex Mundi	Artifex Mundi	Unreleased	Apr 6, 2018	Apr 6, 2018		
Enlisted	First-person shooter	DarkFlow Software	Gaijin Entertainment	Nov 10, 2020	Nov 10, 2020	Nov 10, 2020		
Enter the Gungeon	Roguelike, shoot 'em up	Dodge Roll	Devolver Digital	Apr 5, 2017	Apr 5, 2017	Apr 5, 2017	PA PC	
Epic Loon	Platformer	Macrales Studio	Ukuza	Jun 28, 2018	Jun 28, 2018	Jun 28, 2018		
Escape Sequence	Puzzle	Sid Fish Games	Xitilon	Jun 30, 2021	Jun 30, 2021	Jun 30, 2021		
Escape Academy	Puzzle	Coin Crew	Iam8bit, Skybound Games	Jul 14, 2022	Jul 14, 2022	Jul 14, 2022		
The Escapists	Action	Mouldy Toof Studios	Team17	Feb 13, 2015	Feb 13, 2015	Feb 13, 2015		
The Escapists 2	Action	Mouldy Toof Studios	Team17	Aug 22, 2017	Aug 22, 2017	Aug 22, 2017		
The Escapists: The Walking Dead	Action	Team17	Team17	Sep 25, 2016	Sep 25, 2016	Sep 25, 2016		
ESports Life Tycoon	Simulation	U-Play Online	Raiser Games	Unreleased	Nov 12, 2020	Nov 12, 2020		
Eternity: The Last Unicorn	Action role-playing	Void Games	1C Company	Unreleased	Apr 16, 2019	Apr 16, 2019		
Eternum Ex	Platformer	Flynn's Arcade	Zerouno	Dec 10, 2019	Dec 10, 2019	Dec 10, 2019		
Ethan: Meteor Hunter	Puzzle, Platform	Seaven Studio	Seaven Studio	Unreleased	Jul 1, 2016	Jul 1, 2016		
Etherborn	Puzzle-platformer	Altered Matter	Altered Matter	Unreleased	Jul 18, 2019	Jul 18, 2019		
Eventide: Slavic Fable	Point & Click Adventure, Hidden Objects	Artifex Mundi	Artifex Mundi	Sep 22, 2016	Sep 22, 2016	Sep 22, 2016		
Eventide 2: Sorcerer's Mirror	Point & Click Adventure, Hidden Objects	Artifex Mundi	Artifex Mundi	Aug 25, 2017	Aug 25, 2017	Aug 25, 2017		
Eventide 3: Legacy of Legends	Point & Click Adventure, Hidden Objects	The House of Fables	Artifex Mundi	Unreleased	Jun 29, 2018	Jun 29, 2018	X	
Ever Forward	Puzzle adventure	Pathea Games	PM Studios	Unreleased	Aug 10, 2021	Aug 10, 2021		
Evergate	Puzzle-platform	Stone Lantern Games	PQube	Nov 10, 2020	Nov 10, 2020	Nov 10, 2020		
Everreach: Project Eden	Action-adventure	Elder Games	Headup Games	Unreleased	Dec 4, 2019	Dec 4, 2019		
Everspace	Shooter	Rockfish Games	Rockfish Games	May 26, 2017	May 26, 2017	May 26, 2017	PA	
Evertried	Rougelike	Lunic Games	Dangen Entertainment	Unreleased	Oct 21, 2021	Oct 21, 2021		
Evil Dead: The Game	Horror	Boss Team Games	Saber Interactive	Unreleased	May 13, 2022	May 13, 2022		
Evil Genius 2: World Domination	Real-time strategy; simulation	Rebellion Developments	Rebellion Developments	Unreleased	Nov 30, 2021	Nov 30, 2021		
The Evil Within	Survival horror	Tango Gameworks	Bethesda Softworks	Oct 23, 2014	Oct 14, 2014	Oct 16, 2014		
The Evil Within 2	Survival horror	Tango Gameworks	Bethesda Softworks	Oct 19, 2017	Oct 13, 2017	Oct 13, 2017	X	
Evoland Legendary Edition	Role-playing	Shiro Games	Shiro Games	Unreleased	Feb 8, 2019	Feb 7, 2019	X	
Evolve	First-person shooter	Turtle Rock Studios	2K Games	Mar 5, 2015	Feb 10, 2015	Feb 10, 2015		
Exception	Action-platformer	Traxmaster Software	Traxmaster Software	Aug 13, 2019	Aug 13, 2019	Aug 13, 2019		
Exile's End	Metroidvania	Magnetic Realms	Magnetic Realms	Oct 25, 2016	Oct 25, 2016	Oct 25, 2016		
Exophobia	First-person shooter	Zarc Attack	PM Studios	Unreleased	Jul 23, 2024	Jul 23, 2024		
Expeditions: A MudRunner Game	Vehicle simulation	Saber Interactive	Focus Entertainment	Mar 5, 2024	Mar 5, 2024	Mar 5, 2024		
Explosive Jake	Arcade, action	PigeonDev	Sometimes You	Mar 18, 2020	Mar 18, 2020	Mar 18, 2020		
Extinction	Action & Adventure	Iron Galaxy	Maximum Games	Unreleased	Apr 10, 2018	Apr 10, 2018		
Extreme Exorcism	Platform Game	Golden Ruby Games	Ripstone	Unreleased	Sep 23, 2015	Sep 23, 2015		
ExZeus: The Complete Collection	Rail shooter	Sickhead Games	Zigguat Interactive	Sep 30, 2021	Sep 30, 2021	Sep 30, 2021		
F1 2015	Sim racing	Codemasters	Codemasters	Jul 10, 2015	Jul 30, 2015	Jul 21, 2015		
F1 2016	Sim racing	Codemasters	Codemasters	Aug 19, 2016	Aug 19, 2016	Aug 19, 2016		
F1 2017	Sim racing	Codemasters	Codemasters	Oct 16, 2017	Oct 16, 2017	Oct 16, 2017	X	
F1 2018	Sim racing	Codemasters	Codemasters	Aug 24, 2018	Aug 24, 2018	Aug 24, 2018	X	
F1 2019	Sim racing	Codemasters	Codemasters	Sep 18, 2019	Jun 28, 2019	Jun 28, 2019		
F1 2020	Sim racing	Codemasters	Codemasters	Sep 23, 2020	Jul 10, 2020	Jul 10, 2020		
F1 2021	Sim racing	Codemasters	EA Sports	Jul 16, 2021	Jul 16, 2021	Jul 16, 2021		
F1 22	Sim racing	Codemasters	EA Sports	Jul 1, 2022	Jul 1, 2022	Jul 1, 2022		
F1 23	Sim racing	Codemasters	EA Sports	Jun 16, 2023	Jun 16, 2023	Jun 16, 2023		
F1 24	Sim racing	Codemasters	EA Sports	May 31, 2024	May 31, 2024	May 31, 2024		
F1 Manager 2022	Racing management	Frontier Developments	Frontier Developments	Aug 30, 2022	Aug 30, 2022	Aug 30, 2022		
F1 Manager 2023	Racing management	Frontier Developments	Frontier Developments	Jul 31, 2023	Jul 31, 2023	Jul 31, 2023		
F1 Manager 2024	Racing management	Frontier Developments	Frontier Developments	Jul 23, 2024	Jul 23, 2024	Jul 23, 2024		
Fade to Silence	Survival	Black Forest Games	THQ Nordic	Unreleased	Apr 30, 2019	Apr 30, 2019		
Factotum 90	Puzzle	Tacs Games	Tacs Games	Unreleased	Feb 10, 2016	Feb 10, 2016		
Fae Farm	Farm life sim	Phoenix Labs	Phoenix Labs	Oct 24, 2024	Oct 24, 2024	Oct 24, 2024		
The Falconeer	Simulation	Tomas Sala	Wired Productions	Nov 10, 2020	Nov 10, 2020	Nov 10, 2020		
Fall	2D Action-Adventure	Over the Moon	Over the Moon	Jul 14, 2015	Jul 14, 2015	Jul 14, 2015		
Fall Part 2: Unbound	2D Action-Adventure	Over the Moon	Over the Moon	Feb 13, 2018	Feb 13, 2018	Feb 13, 2018		
Fall Guys: Ultimate Knockout	Battle royale	Mediatonic	Devolver Digital	Jun 21, 2022	Jun 21, 2022	Jun 21, 2022		
Fall of Light: Darkest Edition	Action role-playing	Runeheads; Stage Clear Studios	Digerati	Unreleased	Aug 14, 2018	Aug 14, 2018		
Fallout 4	Action role-playing	Bethesda Game Studios	Bethesda Softworks	Dec 17, 2015	Nov 10, 2015	Nov 10, 2015	X FPSB	
Fallout 76	Action role-playing	Bethesda Game Studios	Bethesda Softworks	Nov 14, 2018	Nov 14, 2018	Nov 14, 2018	X FPSB	
Fantasia: Music Evolved	Music; rhythm; motion controlled	Harmonix	Disney Interactive Studios	Apr 23, 2015	Oct 21, 2014	Oct 24, 2014	K	
Far: Lone Sails	Adventure	Okomotive	Mixtvision Digital	Apr 2, 2019	Apr 2, 2019	Apr 2, 2019		
Far Cry 3 Classic	First-person shooter; open world	Ubisoft	Ubisoft	Jun 26, 2018	Jun 26, 2018	Jun 26, 2018	X	
Far Cry 4	First-person shooter; open world	Ubisoft Montreal	Ubisoft	Jan 29, 2015	Nov 18, 2014	Nov 18, 2014	FPSB	
Far Cry 5	First-person shooter; open world	Ubisoft Montreal	Ubisoft	Mar 27, 2018	Mar 27, 2018	Mar 27, 2018		
Far Cry 6	First-person shooter	Ubisoft Toronto	Ubisoft	Oct 7, 2021	Oct 7, 2021	Oct 7, 2021		
Far Cry Primal	Action; adventure; open world	Ubisoft Montreal	Ubisoft	Feb 23, 2016	Feb 23, 2016	Feb 23, 2016		
Far-Out	Adventure	Escapism Softworks	Escapism Softworks	Jan 17, 2020	Jan 17, 2020	Jan 17, 2020		
Farm Together	Strategy & Simulation, Casual	Milkstone Studios	Milkstone Studios	Jan 18, 2019	Jan 18, 2019	Jan 18, 2019		
Farmer's Dynasty	Simulation	Toplitz Productions	Bigben Interactive	Unreleased	Nov 21, 2019	Nov 21, 2019		
Farming Simulator 15	Strategy & Simulation	Giants Software	Focus Home Interactive	Unreleased	May 19, 2015	May 19, 2015		
Farming Simulator 17	Strategy & Simulation	Giants Software	Focus Home Interactive	Unreleased	Oct 25, 2016	Oct 25, 2016	X	
Farming Simulator 19	Strategy & Simulation	Giants Software	Focus Home Interactive	Unreleased	Nov 20, 2018	Nov 20, 2018		
Fat City	Action, Puzzle	Heavy Iron Studios	Heavy Iron Studios	Unreleased	Oct 2, 2015	Oct 2, 2015		
Fatal Frame: Maiden of Black Water	Survival horror	Koei Tecmo	Koei Tecmo	Oct 28, 2021	Oct 28, 2021	Oct 28, 2021		
Fe	Adventure	Zoink	Electronic Arts	Feb 16, 2018	Feb 16, 2018	Feb 16, 2018	X	
Fear Effect Sedna	Role-playing, third-person shooter	Forever Entertainment	Square Enix Collective	Mar 6, 2018	Mar 6, 2018	Mar 6, 2018		
Fearful Symmetry & The Cursed Prince	Puzzle	Gamera Interactive	Soedesco	Dec 12, 2017	Dec 12, 2017	Dec 12, 2017	PA	
Feist	Platform, puzzle	Bits & Beasts	Finji Games	Dec 13, 2016	Dec 13, 2016	Dec 13, 2016		
Felix the Reaper	Puzzle	Kong Orange	Daedalic Entertainment	Oct 16, 2019	Oct 17, 2019	Oct 16, 2019		
Fell Seal: Arbiter's Mark	Tactics role-playing	6 Eyes Studio	1C Company	Unreleased	Apr 30, 2019	Apr 30, 2019		
Fenix Furia	Platform	Green Lava Studios	Reverb Triple XP	Jun 7, 2016	Jun 7, 2016	Jun 7, 2016		
Feral Fury	Action, adventure, shooter	Skandivania Games	Skandivania Games	Aug 29, 2017	Aug 29, 2017	Aug 29, 2017		
Fermi's Path	Platform	GameArt Studio	GameArt Studio	Unreleased	Sep 25, 2015	Unreleased		
Feudal Alloy	Metroidvania	Attu Games	Attu Games	May 15, 2019	May 15, 2019	May 15, 2019		
Fibbage: The Hilarious Bluffing Party Game	Party	Jackbox Games	Jackbox Games	Unreleased	Aug 21, 2014	Unreleased		
FIFA 14	Sports	EA Canada	Electronic Arts	Unreleased	Nov 19, 2013	Nov 22, 2013		
FIFA 15	Sports	EA Canada	Electronic Arts	Oct 9, 2014	Sep 23, 2014	Sep 26, 2014		
FIFA 16	Sports	EA Canada	Electronic Arts	Oct 8, 2015	Sep 22, 2015	Sep 25, 2015		
FIFA 17	Sports	EA Canada	Electronic Arts	Sep 27, 2016	Sep 27, 2016	Sep 27, 2016		
FIFA 18	Sports	EA Canada	Electronic Arts	Sep 29, 2017	Sep 29, 2017	Sep 29, 2017	X	
FIFA 19	Sports	EA Canada	Electronic Arts	Sep 28, 2018	Sep 28, 2018	Sep 28, 2018	X	
FIFA 20	Sports	EA Canada	Electronic Arts	Sep 27, 2019	Sep 27, 2019	Sep 27, 2019		
FIFA 21	Sports	EA Canada	Electronic Arts	Oct 9, 2020	Oct 9, 2020	Oct 9, 2020		
FIFA 22	Sports	EA Canada	Electronic Arts	Oct 1, 2021	Oct 1, 2021	Oct 1, 2021		
FIFA 23	Sports	EA Canada	Electronic Arts	Sep 30, 2022	Sep 30, 2022	Sep 30, 2022		
Fight'N Rage	Fighting	Sebagamedev; BlitWorks	BlitWorks	Sep 27, 2019	Sep 27, 2019	Sep 27, 2019		
Fighter Within	Fighting, Motion Controlled	Daoka	Ubisoft	Nov 22, 2013	Nov 22, 2013	Nov 22, 2013	K	
Figment	Adventure, Puzzle	Bedtime Digital Games	Bedtime Digital Games	TBA	TBA	TBA		
Fimbul	Action, Hack & Slash	Zaxis Games	Eurovideo Medien	Unreleased	Feb 28, 2019	Feb 28, 2019		
Final Fantasy Type-0 HD	Action role-playing	Square Enix	Square Enix	Mar 19, 2015	Mar 17, 2015	Mar 20, 2015		
Final Fantasy VII	Action role-playing	Square Enix	Square Enix	Mar 26, 2019	Mar 26, 2019	Mar 26, 2019		
Final Fantasy VIII	Action role-playing	Square Enix	Square Enix	Sep 3, 2019	Sep 3, 2019	Sep 3, 2019		
Final Fantasy IX	Action role-playing	Square Enix	Square Enix	Feb 13, 2019	Feb 13, 2019	Feb 13, 2019	PA	
Final Fantasy X/X-2 HD Remaster	Action role-playing	Square Enix	Square Enix	Apr 11, 2019	Apr 16, 2019	Apr 16, 2019	X	
Final Fantasy XII: The Zodiac Age	Action role-playing	Square Enix	Square Enix	Apr 25, 2019	Apr 30, 2019	Apr 30, 2019	X	
Final Fantasy XV	Action role-playing	Square Enix	Square Enix	Nov 29, 2016	Nov 29, 2016	Nov 29, 2016	X	
Final Star	Shoot-em-up	Dynamic Voltage Games	Dynamic Voltage Games	Dec 20, 2018	Dec 20, 2018	Dec 20, 2018	X	
The Final Station	Action & Adventure, Platformer	Do My Best	TinyBuild	Sep 1, 2016	Sep 1, 2016	Sep 1, 2016		
Firefighters: Airport Fire Department	Simulation	VIS-Games	United Independent Entertainment	Unreleased	Sep 27, 2017	Sep 27, 2017		
Firewatch	Adventure, walking simulator	Campo Santo	Campo Santo	Sep 20, 2016	Sep 20, 2016	Sep 20, 2016		
The First Tree	Platformer, Walking simulator	David Wehle	David Wehle	Nov 30, 2018	Nov 30, 2018	Nov 30, 2018	X	
Fishing Planet	Simulation	Fishing Planet	Fishing Planet	Unreleased	Jul 10, 2019	Jul 10, 2019	X	
Fishing Sim World	Simulation	Dovetail Games	Dovetail Games	Unreleased	Sep 18, 2018	Sep 18, 2018		
Fission Superstar X	Roguelite Shoot-em-up	Turbo Pelvis 3000	Turbo Pelvis 3000	May 21, 2019	May 21, 2019	May 21, 2019		
Five Dates	Interactive fiction	Good Gate Media	Wales Interactive	Unreleased	Nov 17, 2020	Nov 17, 2020		
Five Nights at Freddy's	Horror	Scottgames	Clickteam	Nov 29, 2019	Nov 29, 2019	Nov 29, 2019		
Five Nights at Freddy's 2	Horror	Scottgames	Clickteam	Nov 29, 2019	Nov 29, 2019	Nov 29, 2019		
Five Nights at Freddy's 3	Horror	Scottgames	Clickteam	Nov 29, 2019	Nov 29, 2019	Nov 29, 2019		
Five Nights at Freddy's 4	Horror	Scottgames	Clickteam	Nov 29, 2019	Nov 29, 2019	Nov 29, 2019		
Five Nights at Freddy's: Help Wanted	Horror	Steel Wool Games	Steel Wool Games	Oct 29, 2020	Oct 29, 2020	Oct 29, 2020		
Five Nights at Freddy's: Into the Pit	Horror, adventure	Mega Cat Studios	Mega Cat Studios	Sep 27, 2024	Sep 27, 2024	Sep 27, 2024		
Five Nights at Freddy's: Sister Location	Horror	Scott Cawthon	Clickteam LLC USA	Jul 10, 2020	Jul 10, 2020	Jul 10, 2020		
The Flame in the Flood	Survival roguelite	The Molasses Flood	The Molasses Flood	May 4, 2017	Feb 24, 2016	Feb 24, 2016		
Flashback	Action-adventure	Microids	Microids	Unreleased	Nov 20, 2018	Nov 20, 2018		
FlatOut 4: Total Insanity	Racing	Kylotonn	Bigben Interactive	Mar 17, 2017	Mar 17, 2017	Mar 17, 2017		
Flinthook	Action Platformer, Rogue-like	Tribute Games	Tribute Games	Apr 18, 2017	Apr 18, 2017	Apr 18, 2017		
Flipping Death	Puzzle Platformer	Zoink	Zoink	Unreleased	Aug 7, 2018	Aug 7, 2018		
Flockers	Puzzle	Team17	Team17	Unreleased	Sep 19, 2014	Sep 19, 2014		
Floor Kids	Music/Rhythm game	MERJ Media	MERJ Media	Nov 27, 2018	Nov 27, 2018	Nov 27, 2018		
Flutter Bombs	Shoot 'em up	Earthborn	Earthborn	Apr 11, 2019	Apr 12, 2019	Apr 11, 2019		
Flying Tigers: Shadows Over China	Action; shooter	Ace Maddox	Ace Maddox	Unreleased	Jan 12, 2018	Jan 12, 2018		
Fobia: St. Dinfra Hotel	Psychological horror	Pulsatrix Studios	Maximum Games	2022	2022	2022		
Football Game	Point & click adventure	Cloak and Dagger Games	Ratalaika Games	Nov 6, 2019	Nov 6, 2019	Nov 6, 2019		
Football Manager 2021	Sports	Sports Interactive	Sega	Dec 1, 2020	Dec 1, 2020	Dec 1, 2020		
Football Manager 2022	Sports	Sports Interactive	Sega	Nov 9, 2021	Nov 9, 2021	Nov 9, 2021		
Football Manager 2023	Sports	Sports Interactive	Sega	Nov 6, 2022	Nov 6, 2022	Nov 6, 2022		
Football Manager 2024	Sports	Sports Interactive	Sega	Nov 6, 2023	Nov 6, 2023	Nov 6, 2023		
Football, Tactics & Glory	Sports	Creoteam; Raylight Games	Toplitz Productions	Jan 22, 2020	Jan 22, 2020	Jan 22, 2020		
For Honor	Adventure	Ubisoft Montreal	Ubisoft	Mar 31, 2017	Feb 14, 2017	Feb 14, 2017	X	
For the King	Roguelike tactical role-playing	Ironoak Games	Curve Digital	May 10, 2019	May 10, 2019	May 10, 2019		
The Forbidden Arts	Action-adventure	Stingbot Games	Stingbot Games	Aug 7, 2019	Aug 7, 2019	Aug 7, 2019	X	
Forced	Action-adventure	BetaDwarf	BetaDwarf	Oct 24, 2015	Oct 24, 2015	Oct 24, 2015		
Foreclosed	Shooter	Antab Studio	Merge Games	Unreleased	Aug 12, 2021	Aug 12, 2021		
Forgotton Anne	Adventure	ThroughLine Games	Square Enix Collective	May 15, 2018	May 15, 2018	May 15, 2018		
Forma.8	Metroidvania	MixedBag	MixedBag	Unreleased	Feb 23, 2017	Feb 23, 2017		
Forsaken Remastered	6DOF Shooter	Probe Entertainment; Iguana Games; Night Dive Studios	Night Dive Studios	Unreleased	Jul 31, 2018	Jul 31, 2018	X	
Fortified	Strategy	Clapfoot Games	Clapfoot Games	Unreleased	Feb 3, 2016	Feb 3, 2016		
Forza Horizon 2	Racing	Playground Games	Xbox Game Studios	Oct 2, 2014	Sep 30, 2014	Oct 3, 2014		
Forza Horizon 2: Presents Fast & Furious	Racing	Playground Games	Xbox Game Studios	Mar 27, 2015	Mar 27, 2015	Mar 27, 2015		
Forza Horizon 3	Racing	Playground Games	Xbox Game Studios	Sep 27, 2016	Sep 27, 2016	Sep 27, 2016	PA PC HDR X	
Forza Horizon 4	Racing	Playground Games	Xbox Game Studios	Oct 2, 2018	Oct 2, 2018	Oct 2, 2018	PA PC HDR X	
Forza Horizon 5	Racing	Playground Games	Xbox Game Studios	Nov 9, 2021	Nov 9, 2021	Nov 9, 2021		
Forza Motorsport 5	Sim racing	Turn 10 Studios	Xbox Game Studios	Sep 4, 2014	Nov 22, 2013	Nov 22, 2013		
Forza Motorsport 6	Sim racing	Turn 10 Studios	Xbox Game Studios	Sep 17, 2015	Sep 15, 2015	Sep 18, 2015		
Forza Motorsport 7	Sim racing	Turn 10 Studios	Xbox Game Studios	Oct 3, 2017	Oct 3, 2017	Oct 3, 2017	PA PC HDR X	
Fossil Hunters	Action-adventure	Reptoid	Smiling Buddha Games	Unreleased	Sep 12, 2018	Sep 12, 2018		
Four Sided Fantasy	Puzzle platformer	Ludo Land	Serenity Forge	Unreleased	Mar 31, 2017	Mar 31, 2017		
Foxyland	Platform, Retro	Bug Studio	Ratalaika Games	Nov 27, 2019	Nov 27, 2019	Nov 27, 2019		
Fractured Minds	Adventure	Sassybot	Emily M; Le Cortex; Epiphany Games	Nov 13, 2019	Nov 14, 2019	Nov 13, 2019		
Fragments of Him	Adventure	Sassybot	Sassybot	Unreleased	Jun 1, 2016	Jun 1, 2016		
Frane: Dragons' Odyssey	Action role-playing	Exe Create	Kemco	Apr 5, 2019	Apr 5, 2019	Apr 5, 2019		
Freakout: Calamity TV Show	Twin stick shooter	Immaterial Games	JanduSoft	Apr 17, 2020	Apr 17, 2020	Apr 17, 2020		
Freedom Finger	Shoot 'em up	Wide Right Interactive	Wide Right Interactive	Mar 23, 2020	Mar 24, 2020	Mar 23, 2020		
Freedom Planet 2	Platform	GalaxyTrail	GalaxyTrail	TBA	TBA	TBA		
FreezeME	Platformer	RNC	RNC	Unreleased	Sep 1, 2016	Sep 1, 2016		
Friday Night Bullet Arena	Shooter, Arena	Red Nexus Games	Red Nexus Games	Jan 12, 2017	Jan 12, 2017	Jan 12, 2017		
Friday the 13th: The Game	Horror	Gun Media	IllFonic	May 26, 2017	May 26, 2017	May 26, 2017		
The Friends of Ringo Ishikawa	Beat 'em up	Yeo	Yeo	April 14, 2021	April 14, 2021	April 14, 2021		
Frizzy	Action & Adventure	Team Frizz	Team Frizz	Dec 23, 2015	Dec 23, 2015	Dec 23, 2015		
Frost	Strategy, Survival, Deck building	Digerati	Jerome Bodin	Unreleased	Jul 20, 2018	Jul 20, 2018		
Frostpunk	City-building; survival	11 Bit Studios	11 Bit Studios	Oct 11, 2019	Oct 11, 2019	Oct 11, 2019		
Fru	Puzzle, Platform	Through Games	Through Games	Jul 13, 2016	Jul 13, 2016	Jul 13, 2016	K	
Fruit Ninja Kinect 2	Motion Controlled	Halfbrick	Halfbrick	Jun 30, 2015	Mar 18, 2015	Mar 18, 2015	K	
Fuga: Melodies of Steel	Tactical role-playing	CyberConnect2	CyberConnect2	Jul 29, 2021	Jul 29, 2021	Jul 29, 2021	K	
Fuga: Melodies of Steel 2	Tactical role-playing	CyberConnect2	CyberConnect2	May 11, 2023	May 11, 2023	May 11, 2023	K	
Full Metal Furies	Platform	Cellar Door Games	Cellar Door Games	Jan 17, 2018	Jan 17, 2018	Jan 17, 2018	PA PC	
Full Mojo Rampage	Rogue-Like	Over the Top Games	Nicalis	Jun 28, 2016	Jun 28, 2016	Jun 28, 2016		
FullBlast	Shoot 'Em Up	UFO Crash Games	Ratalaika Games	Unreleased	Sep 5, 2018	Sep 5, 2018		
Fumiko!	Platformer	Fumiko Game Studio	Fumiko Game Studio	Feb 23, 2018	Feb 23, 2018	Feb 23, 2018		
Funk of Titans	Platform	A Crowd of Monsters	EnjoyUp	Unreleased	Jan 9, 2015	Jan 9, 2015		
Furi	Action	The Game Bakers	The Game Bakers	Dec 2, 2016	Dec 2, 2016	Dec 2, 2016		
Furwind	Platformer	Boonfire	JanduSoft	Jul 25, 2019	Jul 25, 2019	Jul 25, 2019		
Future War: Reborn	Action, Shooter	Guangzhou Good Network Technology	E-Home Entertainment	Dec 20, 2017	Dec 20, 2017	Dec 20, 2017		
G Prime Into The Rain	Strategy	Soma Games	Code-Monkeys	Unreleased	Jan 6, 2016	Unreleased		
Gaijin Charenji 1: Kiss or Kill	Action	Overgame Studio	Overgame Studio	Sep 4, 2019	Sep 4, 2019	Sep 4, 2019		
Galaxy of Pen & Paper +1 Edition	Role-playing	Behold Studios	Plug In Digital	Unreleased	Apr 8, 2020	Apr 8, 2020		
Game of Thrones: Season One	Graphic adventure	Telltale Games	Telltale Games	Unreleased	Nov 17, 2014	Nov 19, 2014		
Ganbare! Super Strikers	Sports, strategy	Rese Games	Ratalaika Games	Feb 26, 2020	Feb 26, 2020	Feb 26, 2020		
Gang Beasts	Party game, Fighting	Boneloaf	Double Fine Productions	Mar 27, 2019	Mar 27, 2019	Mar 27, 2019		
The Gardens Between	Adventure	The Voxel Agents	The Voxel Agents	Nov 29, 2018	Nov 29, 2018	Nov 29, 2018		
Garfield Kart: Furious Racing	Racing, Karting	Artefacts Studio	Anuman Interactive	Nov 7, 2019	Nov 19, 2019	Nov 7, 2019		
Gas Guzzlers Extreme	Racing	Gamepires	Iceberg Interactive	Nov 4, 2016	Nov 4, 2016	Nov 4, 2016		
Gato Roboto	Action & Adventure, metroidvania	Doinksoft	Devolver Digital	Apr 21, 2020	Apr 21, 2020	Apr 21, 2020		
Gear Gauntlet	Action & Adventure	Drop Dead Interactive	Drop Dead Interactive	Unreleased	Apr 15, 2016	Apr 15, 2016		
Gears 5	Third-person shooter	The Coalition	Xbox Game Studios	Sep 10, 2019	Sep 10, 2019	Sep 10, 2019	PA PC HDR X	
Gears Tactics	Turn-based tactics	The Coalition; Splash Damage	Xbox Game Studios	Nov 10, 2020	Nov 10, 2020	Nov 10, 2020		
Gears of War 4	Third-person shooter	The Coalition	Xbox Game Studios	May 25, 2017	Oct 11, 2016	Oct 11, 2016	PA PC HDR X	
Gears of War: Ultimate Edition	Third-person shooter	The Coalition	Xbox Game Studios	Unreleased	Aug 25, 2015	Aug 28, 2015		
Gekido: Kintaro's Revenge	Beat 'em up	Naps Team	Naps Team	Unreleased	Jul 13, 2018	Jul 13, 2018		
Gene Rain	Third-person shooter	Deeli Network Technology	E-Home Entertainment Development	Unreleased	Jul 24, 2016	Jul 24, 2016	X	
Genesis Alpha One	Shooter, Survival	Radiation Blue	Team17	Unreleased	Jan 29, 2019	Jan 29, 2019		
Geometry Wars 3: Dimensions	Action-adventure	Lucid Games	Sierra Entertainment	Nov 26, 2014	Nov 26, 2014	Nov 26, 2014		
Gem Smashers	Puzzle, Casual	Raylight Games	Funbox Media	Unreleased	Nov 2, 2018	Nov 2, 2018		
Gemini: Heroes Reborn	Action & Adventure	Phosphor Games	Imperative Entertainment	Unreleased	Jan 19, 2016	Jan 19, 2016		
Generation Zero	Survival/Shooter	Avalanche Studios	Avalanche Studios	Unreleased	Mar 26, 2019	Mar 26, 2019	X	
Get Even	First-person shooter	The Farm 51	Bandai Namco Entertainment	Jun 23, 2017	Jun 23, 2017	Jun 23, 2017		
Ghost 1.0	Metroidvania	Francisco Tellez de Meneses	Francisco Tellez de Meneses	Jul 11, 2018	Jul 11, 2018	Jul 11, 2018		
Ghost Blade HD	Scrolling shoot 'em up	HuCast Games	2Dream	Unreleased	Feb 28, 2017	Feb 28, 2017		
Ghost of a Tale	Stealth adventure	Seith CG	Seith CG	Unreleased	Mar 12, 2019	Mar 12, 2019		
Ghost Sweeper	Puzzle platformer	7 Raven Studios	Totalconsole	Unreleased	Apr 4, 2020	Apr 4, 2020		
Ghostbusters	Action & Adventure	FireForge	Activision	Jul 12, 2016	Jul 12, 2016	Jul 12, 2016		
Ghostbusters: The Video Game Remastered	Third-person shooter	Saber Interactive	Mad Dog	Oct 4, 2019	Oct 4, 2019	Oct 4, 2019		
Ghosts 'n Goblins Resurrection	Platform	Capcom	Capcom	Jun 1, 2021	Jun 1, 2021	Jun 1, 2021		
Ghostrunner	Action; platform	One More Level	All in! Games; 505 Games	Oct 27, 2020	Oct 27, 2020	Oct 27, 2020		
Ghoul Patrol	Run and gun	Dotemu	Lucasfilm Games	Unreleased	Jun 29, 2021	Jun 29, 2021		
G.I. Joe: Operation Blackout	Third-person shooter	IguanaBee	GameMill Entertainment	Unreleased	Oct 13, 2020	Oct 13, 2020		
Giana Sisters: Dream Runners	Platform, beat 'em up	Black Forest Games	EuroVideo Medien	Aug 19, 2015	Aug 19, 2015	Aug 19, 2015		
Giana Sisters: Twisted Dreams - Director's Cut	Platform, Beat 'em up	Black Forest Games	Black Forest Games	Apr 30, 2017	Dec 12, 2014	Dec 12, 2014		
Gift of Parthax	Action	Foldergeist Studios	Foldergeist Studios	Aug 21, 2019	Aug 21, 2019	Aug 21, 2019		
Giga Wrecker Alt.	Platformer, Physics puzzler	Game Freak	Rising Star Games	Oct 29, 2019	May 3, 2019	May 3, 2019		
Gigantosaurus: The Game	Platformer	Wildsphere	Outright Games	Mar 27, 2020	Mar 27, 2020	Mar 27, 2020		
Gimmick! 2	Platform	Bitwave Games	Sunsoft; Clear River Games	Dec 19, 2024	Jan 30, 2025	Jan 30, 2025		
Glass Masquerade	Puzzle	Onyx Lute; Stage Clear Studios	Digerati	Unreleased	Feb 8, 2019	Feb 8, 2019		
Glass Masquerade 2	Puzzle	Onyx Lute; Stage Clear Studios	Digerati	Feb 14, 2020	Feb 14, 2020	Feb 14, 2020	X	
Gleaner Heights	Adventure, Role-playing, Farming	Emilios Manolidis	Emilios Manolidis	Unreleased	Apr 10, 2019	Apr 10, 2019		
Gnomes Garden	Casual Strategy	SPL	8Floor	Unreleased	Oct 3, 2018	Oct 3, 2018		
Gnomes Garden 2	Casual Strategy	SPL	8Floor	Unreleased	Oct 30, 2018	Oct 30, 2018		
Gnomes Garden 3: The Thief of Castles	Casual Strategy	SPL	8Floor	Unreleased	Jul 4, 2018	Jul 4, 2018		
Gnomes Garden: New Home	Casual Strategy	SPL	8Floor	Unreleased	Nov 28, 2018	Nov 28, 2018		
Gnomes Garden: Lost King	Casual Strategy	SPL	8Floor	Unreleased	Aug 23, 2019	Aug 23, 2019		
Goat Simulator	Simulation	Coffee Stain Studios	Double Eleven	Apr 17, 2015	Apr 17, 2015	Apr 17, 2015		
Goat Simulator: Mmore Goatz Edition	Simulation	Coffee Stain Studios	Double Eleven	Aug 26, 2015	Aug 26, 2015	Aug 26, 2015		
Goat Simulator 3	Action; Simulation	Coffee Stain North	Coffee Stain Publishing	Oct 24, 2024	Oct 24, 2024	Oct 24, 2024		
Goatpunks	Party game, Casual	Alberto Santiago	Studio Canvas	Nov 30, 2018	Nov 30, 2018	Nov 30, 2018	X	
God of Light: Remastered	Puzzle	Playmous	Playmous	Oct 20, 2017	Oct 20, 2017	Oct 20, 2017	PA	
God's Trigger	Top-down shooter	One More Level	Techland	Unreleased	Apr 18, 2019	Apr 18, 2019	X	
Gods Remastered	Action	Robot Riot; The Bitmap Brothers	Robot Riot	Unreleased	Dec 4, 2018	Dec 4, 2018		
Gods Will Fall	Action-adventure	Clever Beans	Deep Silver	Unreleased	Jan 29, 2021	Jan 29, 2021		
Going Under	Action	Aggro Crab Games	Team17	Sep 24, 2020	Sep 24, 2020	Sep 24, 2020		
Golazo!	Sports	Purple Tree Studio	Klabater	Nov 27, 2019	Nov 27, 2019	Nov 27, 2019		
Golem Gates	Real time strategy, collectible card game	Laser Guided Games	Digerati	Unreleased	May 31, 2019	May 31, 2019	X	
Goliath	Action & Adventure	Promcast Limited	E-Home Entertainment	Jun 30, 2017	Jun 30, 2017	Jun 30, 2017		
The Golf Club	Sports	HB Studios	HB Studios	Aug 19, 2014	Aug 19, 2014	Aug 19, 2014		
The Golf Club 2	Sports	HB Studios	HB Studios	Jun 27, 2017	Jun 27, 2017	Jun 27, 2017		
The Golf Club 2019 Featuring PGA Tour	Sports	HB Studios	2K Games	Oct 5, 2018	Aug 28, 2018	Aug 28, 2018	X	
Golf with Your Friends	Sports	Blacklight Interative	Team17	May 18, 2020	May 19, 2020	May 18, 2020		
Gone Home	Action & Adventure	The Fullbright Company	Midnight City	Unreleased	Jan 12, 2016	Feb 12, 2016		
Gonner	Roguelike action-platformer	Art in Heart	Raw Fury	Sep 14, 2018	Sep 14, 2018	Sep 14, 2018		
Goodbye Deponia	Point-and-click adventure	Daedalic Entertainment	Daedalic Entertainment	Jan 30, 2019	Jan 30, 2019	Jan 30, 2019		
The Good Life	Role-playing	White Owls	Playism	Oct 15, 2021	Oct 15, 2021	Oct 15, 2021	PA	
Goosebumps: The Game	Action & Adventure	WayForward Technologies	GameMill Entertainment	Oct 14, 2015	Oct 14, 2015	Oct 14, 2015		
Gorogoa	Puzzle	Buried Signal, LLC.	Annapurna Interactive	May 22, 2018	May 22, 2018	May 22, 2018		
Grab the Bottle	Puzzle	Kamina Dimension	Sometimes You	Unreleased	Jun 20, 2018	Jun 20, 2018	X	
Grand Prix Rock 'N Racing	Racing	EnjoyUp Games	EnjoyUp Games	Unreleased	May 13, 2016	May 13, 2016		
Grand Theft Auto: The Trilogy – The Definitive Edition	Action-adventure	Grove Street Games	Rockstar Games	Nov 11, 2021	Nov 11, 2021	Nov 11, 2021		
Grand Theft Auto V	Action-adventure, open world	Rockstar North	Rockstar Games	Dec 11, 2014	Nov 18, 2014	Nov 18, 2014		
Grand Theft Auto Online	Action-adventure, open world	Rockstar North	Rockstar Games	Dec 13, 2017	Nov 18, 2014	Nov 18, 2014		
The Grand Tour	Racing	Amazon Game Studios	Amazon	Unreleased	Jan 15, 2019	Jan 15, 2019		
Grass Cutter: Mutated Lawns	Arcade action	Usanik	Sometimes You	Jul 10, 2019	Jul 10, 2019	Jul 10, 2019	X	
Gravel	Racing	Milestone srl	Milestone srl	Unreleased	Feb 27, 2018	Feb 27, 2018		
Graveyard Keeper	Adventure, Role-playing	Lazy Bear Games	Lazy Bear Games	Unreleased	Aug 15, 2018	Aug 15, 2018		
Gravity Duck	Platformer	Woblyware	Ratalaika Games	Aug 14, 2019	Aug 14, 2019	Aug 14, 2019		
Gravity Heroes	Shoot 'em up	Studica Solutions	PQube	Unreleased	Jan 22, 2021	Jan 22, 2021		
GreedFall	Action role-playing	Spiders	Focus Home Interactive	Sep 10, 2019	Sep 10, 2019	Sep 10, 2019		
Green: The Life Algorithm	Side-scrolling action, Metroidvania	Estacion Pi Y Diseno	Estacion Pi Y Diseno	Nov 22, 2019	Nov 22, 2019	Nov 22, 2019		
Grey Skies: A War of the Worlds Story	Action-adventure	Steel Arts Software	Steel Arts Software	Nov 4, 2020	Nov 5, 2020	Nov 5, 2020		
Grid	Racing	Codemasters	Codemasters	Unreleased	Oct 11, 2019	Oct 11, 2019		
Grid Legends	Racing	Codemasters	Electronic Arts	Feb 25, 2022	Feb 25, 2022	Feb 25, 2022		
Gridd: Retroenhanced	Shoot em' up	Antab Studio	Kongregate	Unreleased	Jul 26, 2017	Jul 26, 2017	X	
Griftlands	Roguelike; deck-building	Klei Entertainment	Klei Entertainment	Unreleased	Jun 4, 2021	Jun 4, 2021		
Grim Dawn	Action role-playing, hack and slash	Crate Entertainment	Crate Entertainment	Dec 3, 2021	Dec 3, 2021	Dec 3, 2021		
Grim Legends: The Forsaken Bride	Point & Click Adventure, Hidden Objects	Artifex Mundi	Artifex Mundi	Unreleased	Jun 10, 2016	Jun 10, 2016		
Grim Legends 2: Song of the Dark Swan	Point & Click Adventure, Hidden Objects	Artifex Mundi	Artifex Mundi	Unreleased	Jun 23, 2017	Jun 23, 2017		
Grim Legends 3: The Dark City	Point & Click Adventure, Hidden Objects	Artifex Mundi	Artifex Mundi	Unreleased	May 11, 2018	May 11, 2018	X	
Grip: Combat Racing	Racing	Caged Element	Wired Productions	Unreleased	Nov 6, 2018	Nov 6, 2018		
Grizzland	Retro action-adventure	EastAsiaSoft	EastAsiaSoft	Feb 26, 2020	Feb 26, 2020	Feb 26, 2020		
Grood	Shoot 'em up	CC_ARTS	Drageus Games	Unreleased	Oct 23, 2020	Oct 23, 2020		
Grounded	Survival	Obsidian Entertainment	Xbox Game Studios	Sep 27, 2022	Sep 27, 2022	Sep 27, 2022		
Grow Up	Adventure, Platformer	Ubisoft Reflections	Ubisoft	Aug 16, 2016	Aug 16, 2016	Aug 16, 2016		
Gryphon Knight Epic	Action & Adventure	Cyber Rhino Studios	Cyber Rhino Studios	Unreleased	Mar 30, 2016	Mar 30, 2016		
Guacamelee! Super Turbo Champion Edition	Platform, Beat 'em up	DrinkBox Studios	DrinkBox Studios	Jul 2, 2014	Jul 2, 2014	Jul 2, 2014		
Guacamelee! 2	Platform, Beat 'em up	DrinkBox Studios	DrinkBox Studios	Jan 18, 2019	Jan 18, 2019	Jan 18, 2019		
Guard Duty	Graphic adventure	Sick Chicken Studios	Ratalaika Games	Apr 22, 2020	Apr 22, 2020	Apr 22, 2020		
Marvel's Guardians of the Galaxy	Action-adventure	Eidos-Montréal	Square Enix	Oct 26, 2021	Oct 26, 2021	Oct 26, 2021		
Guardians of the Galaxy: The Telltale Series	Graphic adventure	Telltale Games	Telltale Games	Apr 18, 2017	Apr 18, 2017	Apr 18, 2017		
Guilt Battle Arena	Dueling	Invincible Cat	ForwardXP	Feb 14, 2018	Feb 14, 2018	Feb 14, 2018		
Guitar Hero Live	Music, Rhythm	Free Style Games	Activision	Unreleased	Oct 20, 2015	Oct 23, 2015		
Guns, Gore and Cannoli	Action-platformer	Crazy Monkey Studios	Crazy Monkey Studios	Unreleased	Sep 25, 2015	Sep 25, 2015		
Guns, Gore and Cannoli 2	Action-platformer	Crazy Monkey Studios	Crazy Monkey Studios	Unreleased	Oct 12, 2018	Oct 12, 2018		
Gunscape	First-person shooter, Sandbox	Blowfish Studios	Blowfish Studios	Unreleased	Mar 2, 2016	Mar 2, 2016	PC	
Gunsport	Shooter	Necrosoft Games	Iron Galaxy Studios	TBA	TBA	TBA		
Gunvein	Shoot 'em up	NGDEV	NGDEV	2022	2022	2022		
Gunvolt Chronicles: Luminous Avenger iX	Side-scrolling action, run 'n gun	Inti Creates	Inti Creates	Jan 1, 2020	Jan 2, 2020	Jan 1, 2020		
Gunvolt Chronicles: Luminous Avenger iX 2	Action; platform	Inti Creates	Inti Creates	Jan 27, 2022	Jan 27, 2022	Jan 27, 2022		
GunWorld	Action	M07 Games	M07 Games	Unreleased	Sep 16, 2015	Unreleased		
GunWorld 2	Action	M07 Games	M07 Games	Unreleased	May 13, 2016	Unreleased		
Guts & Glory	Racing	Hak Jak	TinyBuild	Jul 19, 2018	Jul 19, 2018	Jul 19, 2018		
H1Z1: King of the Kill	Survival	Daybreak Game Company	Daybreak Game Company	TBA	TBA	TBA		
Habitat: A Thousand Generations in Orbit	Strategy	4gency	4gency	TBA	TBA	TBA		
Hack, Slash & Backstab	Action & Adventure	Magic Spell Studios	Magic Spell Studios	Aug 30, 2016	Aug 30, 2016	Aug 30, 2016		
Haimrik	Puzzle Platformer	Below The Game	1C Company	Unreleased	Jun 19, 2018	Jun 19, 2018		
Halo: The Master Chief Collection	First-person shooter	343 Industries	Xbox Game Studios	Nov 13, 2014	Nov 11, 2014	Nov 11, 2014		
Halo: Spartan Assault	Top-down shooter	343 Industries; Vanguard Games	Xbox Game Studios	Sep 4, 2014	Dec 24, 2013	Dec 24, 2013		
Halo 5: Guardians	First-person shooter	343 Industries	Microsoft Studios	Oct 27, 2015	Oct 27, 2015	Oct 27, 2015	X	
Halo Infinite	First-person shooter	343 Industries	Xbox Game Studios	Dec 8, 2021	Dec 8, 2021	Dec 8, 2021	PA PC X	
Halo Wars: Definitive Edition	Real-time Strategy	Behaviour Interactive; 343i	Xbox Game Studios	Apr 20, 2017	Apr 20, 2017	Apr 20, 2017	PA	
Halo Wars 2	Real-time Strategy	Creative Assembly	Xbox Game Studios	Feb 21, 2017	Feb 21, 2017	Feb 21, 2017	PA X	
Hammerwatch	Action & Adventure	Crackshell	BlitWorks	Dec 14, 2017	Dec 14, 2017	Dec 14, 2017		
Hand of Fate	Action-adventure; role-playing	Defiant Development	Defiant Development	Feb 17, 2015	Feb 17, 2015	Feb 17, 2015		
Hand of Fate 2	Action-adventure; role-playing	Defiant Development	Defiant Development	Dec 1, 2017	Dec 1, 2017	Dec 1, 2017	X	
Handball 16	Sports	Eko Software	Bigben Interactive	Nov 20, 2015	Nov 20, 2015	Nov 20, 2015		
Handball 17	Sports	Eko Software	Bigben Interactive	Nov 10, 2016	Nov 10, 2016	Nov 10, 2016		
Handball 21	Sports	Eko Software	Nacon	Nov 12, 2020	Nov 12, 2020	Nov 12, 2020		
Hard Reset Redux	Shooter	Flying Wild Hog	Gambitious Digital Entertainment	Jun 3, 2016	Jun 3, 2016	Jun 3, 2016		
Hardspace: Shipbreaker	Simulation	Blackbird Interactive	Focus Home Interactive	TBA	TBA	TBA		
Harry Potter: Quidditch Champions	Sports	Unbroken Studios	Warner Bros. Games	Sep 3, 2024	Sep 3, 2024	Sep 3, 2024		
Harvest Moon: One World	Simulation	Appci Corporation	Natsume Inc.	Unreleased	Mar 2, 2021	Mar 5, 2021		
Has-Been Heroes	Action, Strategy	Frozenbyte	GameTrust	Mar 28, 2017	Mar 28, 2017	Mar 28, 2017		
A Hat in Time	Platform	Gears for Breakfast	Humble Bundle	Unreleased	Dec 6, 2017	Dec 6, 2017		
Hatsune Miku Logic Paint S	Puzzle	Crypton Future Media	Crypton Future Media	Jan 19, 2022	Jan 19, 2022	Jan 19, 2022		
Haunted Halloween '86	Side-scrolling retro action	Retrotainment Games	Retrotainment Games	Aug 24, 2018	Aug 24, 2018	Aug 24, 2018		
Hauntii	Adventure	Moonloop Games	Firestoke	May 23, 2024	May 23, 2024	May 23, 2024		
Hayfever	Platformer	Pixadome	Zordix Publishing	Feb 25, 2020	Feb 25, 2020	Feb 25, 2020		
Headlander	Platformer, Metroidvania	Double Fine Productions	Adult Swim Games	Unreleased	Nov 17, 2016	Nov 17, 2016		
Headliner: NoviNews	Adventure, simulation	Unbound Creations	Chorus Worldwide	Dec 11, 2019	Dec 11, 2019	Dec 10, 2019		
Headspun	FMV adventure	Superstring	Wales Interactive	Aug 27, 2019	Aug 28, 2019	Aug 27, 2019		
HeartZ: Co-Hope Puzzles	Platformer	Upper Byte	Neko Entertainment	Unreleased	Jun 8, 2016	Jun 8, 2016		
Heart&Slash	Action & Adventure	aheartfulofgames	Badland Games	Unreleased	Jun 24, 2016	Jun 24, 2016		
Heavy Fire: Red Shadow	Shooter	Anshar Studios	Mastiff	Unreleased	Oct 19, 2018	Oct 19, 2018		
Hell Warders	Action role-playing defense	Anti Gravity Game Studios	PQube	Mar 20, 2019	Mar 20, 2019	Mar 20, 2019		
Hellblade: Senua's Sacrifice	Action & Adventure	Ninja Theory	Ninja Theory	Apr 11, 2019	Apr 11, 2019	Apr 11, 2019	X	
Hellfront: Honeymoon	Party shooter	Skygoblin	Thunderful Games	Unreleased	Dec 19, 2018	Dec 19, 2018		
Hellmut: The Badass from Hell	Roguelike shooter	Volcani.cc	2tainment	May 31, 2019	May 31, 2019	May 31, 2019		
Hello Neighbor	Stealth, Survival Horror	Dynamic Pixels	TinyBuild	Dec 8, 2017	Dec 8, 2017	Dec 8, 2017	PA X	
Hello Neighbor 2	Stealth, Survival Horror	Eerie Guest Studios	TinyBuild	Dec 6, 2022	Dec 6, 2022	Dec 6, 2022		
Hello Neighbor: Hide and Seek	Stealth, Adventure	Dynamic Pixels	TinyBuild	Dec 7, 2018	Dec 7, 2018	Dec 7, 2018		
Help Will Come Tomorrow	Survival, strategy	Arclight Creations	Klabater	Apr 22, 2020	Apr 22, 2020	Apr 22, 2020		
Hellpoint	Action role-playing	Cradle Games	TinyBuild	Unreleased	Jul 30, 2020	Jul 30, 2020		
Her Majesty's Spiffing	Adventure	Billy Goat Entertainment	Billy Goat Entertainment	Dec 7, 2016	Dec 7, 2016	Dec 7, 2016		
Hero Defense	Real-time strategy, Tower-defense	Happy Tuesday	Headup Games	Unreleased	Aug 15, 2018	Aug 15, 2018		
Heroes Trials	Action role-playing	Shinyuden	Ratalaika Games	Jan 23, 2019	Jan 23, 2019	Jan 23, 2019		
Hexologic	Puzzle	Mythic Owls	Mythic Owls	Jun 14, 2019	Jun 14, 2019	Jun 14, 2019	X	
Hidden Through Time	Puzzle	Crazy Monkey Studios	Crazy Monkey Studios	Mar 12, 2020	Mar 12, 2020	Mar 12, 2020		
Himno	Platformer	David Moralejo Sanchez	Ratalaika Games	Sep 4, 2019	Sep 4, 2019	Sep 4, 2019		
Hitman	Stealth	IO Interactive	Square Enix	Mar 11, 2016	Mar 11, 2016	Mar 11, 2016	X	
Hitman 2	Stealth	IO Interactive	Warner Bros. Interactive Entertainment	Nov 13, 2018	Nov 13, 2018	Nov 13, 2018	X	
Hitman HD Enhanced Collection	Stealth	IO Interactive	Warner Bros. Interactive Entertainment	Unreleased	Jan 11, 2019	Jan 11, 2019		
Hive Jump	Roguelite action-platformer	Graphite Lab	Graphite Lab	Jan 11, 2019	Jan 11, 2019	Jan 11, 2019	X	
Hoggy 2	Platformer	Raptisoft	Ratalaika Games	Jul 24, 2019	Jul 24, 2019	Jul 24, 2019		
Hogwarts Legacy	Action-role playing	Avalanche Software	Portkey Games	May 5, 2023	May 5, 2023	May 5, 2023		
Hole New World	Platform	Mad Gear Games	Mad Gear Games	Unreleased	Jun 9, 2017	Jun 9, 2017		
Hollow	Sci-Fi Horror	MMEU	Forever Entertainment	Unreleased	May 30, 2019	May 30, 2019		
Hollow Knight	Metroidvania, Platform	Team Cherry	Team Cherry	Sep 25, 2018	Sep 25, 2018	Sep 25, 2018		
Hollow Knight: Silksong	Metroidvania, Platform	Team Cherry	Team Cherry	Sep 4, 2025	Sep 4, 2025	Sep 4, 2025		
Home Sweet Home	Horror	Yggdrazil Group	Mastiff	Unreleased	Oct 16, 2018	Oct 16, 2018		
Homefront: The Revolution	Shooter	Dambuster Studios	Deep Silver	May 17, 2016	May 17, 2016	May 17, 2016	X	
Hood: Outlaws & Legends	Stealth, action	Sumo Digital	Focus Home Interactive	May 7, 2021	May 7, 2021	May 7, 2021		
Hoookbots	Platform arena brawler	Tree Interactive	Tree Interactive	Aug 28, 2019	Aug 28, 2019	Aug 28, 2019		
HoPiKo	Platform	Laser Dog	Merge Games	Unreleased	Oct 18, 2016	Oct 18, 2016		
Horizon Chase Turbo	Racing	Aquiris Game Studio	Aquiris Game Studio	Unreleased	Nov 28, 2018	Nov 28, 2018	X	
Horned Knight	Action platformer	Josep Monzonis Hernandez	2Awesome Studio	Unreleased	Feb 24, 2021	Feb 24, 2021		
Horse Racing 2016	Racing; simulation	Yash Future Tech Solutions	Yash Future Tech Solutions	Oct 20, 2016	Oct 20, 2016	Oct 20, 2016		
Hotel Life: A Resort Simulator	Business simulation	RingZero Game Studio	Nacon	Aug 26, 2021	Aug 26, 2021	Aug 26, 2021		
Hotel Transylvania 3: Monsters Overboard	Adventure	Torus Games	Outright Games	Jul 13, 2018	Jul 13, 2018	Jul 13, 2018		
Hotel Transylvania: Scary-Tale Adventures	Platform	Drakhar Studio	Outright Games	Unreleased	TBA	TBA		
Hotline Miami Collection	Shooter	Dennaton Games	Devolver Digital	Unreleased	Apr 7, 2020	Apr 7, 2020	X	
Hot Wheels Unleashed	Racing	Milestone	Milestone	Sep 30, 2021	Sep 30, 2021	Sep 30, 2021		
House Flipper	Simulation	Frozen District	Frozen District	Feb 26, 2020	Feb 26, 2020	Feb 26, 2020		
Hover	Platform; racing; parkour	Midgar Studio; Fusty Games	Playdius	Unreleased	Sep 19, 2018	Sep 19, 2018	X	
Hovership Havox	Roguelite twin-stick shooter	Snow Day Software	Snow Day Software	Jan 17, 2020	Jan 17, 2020	Jan 17, 2020	X	
How To Survive: Storm Warning Edition	Action role-playing; survival horror	Eko Software	505 Games	Oct 29, 2014	Oct 29, 2014	Oct 29, 2014		
How to Survive 2	Action role-playing; survival horror	Eko Software	505 Games	Feb 13, 2017	Feb 13, 2017	Feb 13, 2017		
How To Take Off Your Mask Remastered	Visual novel	Roseverte	Ratalaika Games	Feb 5, 2021	Feb 5, 2021	Feb 5, 2021		
Hue	Puzzle platformer	Fiddlesticks	Curve Digital	Aug 30, 2016	Aug 23, 2016	Aug 30, 2016		
Human: Fall Flat	Puzzle platformer	Tomas Sakalauskas	Curve Digital	May 12, 2017	May 12, 2017	May 12, 2017		
Hungry Shark World	Action	Future Games of London	Ubisoft	Jul 17, 2018	Jul 17, 2018	Jul 17, 2018		
Hunt: Showdown	Survival horror; third-person shooter; role-playing	Crytek USA	Crytek	Unreleased	Aug 20, 2019	Aug 20, 2019		
Hunter's Legacy	Platformer	Lienzo	Lienzo	Jan 20, 2017	Jan 20, 2017	Jan 20, 2017		
Hunting Simulator	Simulation	Neopica	Bigben Interactive	Jul 10, 2017	Jul 10, 2017	Jul 10, 2017		
Hyper Jam	Arena Brawler	Bit Dragon	Bit Dragon	Unreleased	Feb 12, 2019	Feb 12, 2019	X	
Hyper Light Drifter	Action-adventure; role-playing	Heart Machine	Heart Machine	Jul 26, 2016	Jul 26, 2016	Jul 26, 2016		
Hyper Sentinel	Shoot 'em up, Retro	Four5Six Pixel	Huey Games	Unreleased	May 11, 2018	May 11, 2018		
Hyper Void	Shooter	Framez Technology	Framez Technology	Unreleased	Jan 6, 2016	Jan 6, 2016		
HyperDot	Arcade, party	Tribe Games	Glitch	Jan 30, 2020	Jan 31, 2020	Jan 30, 2020	PA X	
Hyperdrive Massacre	Shooter	34BigThings	34BigThings	Unreleased	Jan 13, 2016	Jan 13, 2016		
HyperParasite	Twin-stick shooter	Troglobytes Games	Hound Picked Games	Apr 3, 2020	Apr 3, 2020	Apr 3, 2020		
I, Hope	Adventure, Platformer	Kenny Roy	GameChanger Charity	Apr 18, 2018	Apr 18, 2018	Apr 18, 2018		
I Am Bread	Puzzle	Bossa Studios	Bossa Studios	Jan 20, 2017	Jan 20, 2017	Jan 20, 2017		
I Am Dead	Adventure	Hollow Ponds	Annapurna Interactive	Aug 9, 2021	Aug 9, 2021	Aug 9, 2021		
I Am Fish	Puzzle	Bossa Studios	Curve Digital	Sep 15, 2021	Sep 15, 2021	Sep 15, 2021		
I am The Hero	Beat 'em up	Mongoose Studio	E-Home Entertainment	Unreleased	Nov 22, 2018	Nov 22, 2018	PA	
I and Me	Puzzle-platformer	Wish Fang	Ratalaika Games	Mar 6, 2019	Mar 6, 2019	Mar 6, 2019		
I Hate Running Backwards	Shooter Roguelite	Binx Interactive	Devolver Digital	Unreleased	May 22, 2018	May 22, 2018		
Ice Age: Scrat's Nutty Adventure	Platformer	Just Add Water	Outright Games	Oct 18, 2019	Oct 18, 2019	Oct 18, 2019		
Icewind Dale: Enhanced Edition	Role-playing	Black Isle Studios; Beamdog	Beamdog	Oct 14, 2019	Oct 15, 2019	Oct 14, 2019		
Iconoclasts	Metroidvania	Joakim Sandberg	Bifrost Entertainment	Unreleased	Jan 23, 2020	Jan 23, 2020	PA	
#IDARB	Platformer, Sports	Other Ocean Interactive	Other Ocean Interactive	Jan 30, 2015	Jan 30, 2015	Jan 30, 2015	PC	
Ikenfell	Tactical role-playing	Happy Ray Games	Humble Games	Unreleased	Oct 8, 2020	Oct 8, 2020		
Illusion of L'Phalcia	Japanese role-playing	Exe Create	Kemco	Jul 3, 2019	Jul 3, 2019	Jul 3, 2019	PA	
Immortal Planet	Action role-playing	Teedoubleu Games; Couch Monster	Couch Monster	Unreleased	Dec 6, 2019	Dec 6, 2019		
Immortal Redneck	Shooter	Crema Games	Crema Games	Feb 27, 2018	Feb 27, 2018	Feb 27, 2018		
Immortal: Unchained	Shooter; role-playing	Toadman Interactive	Toadman Interactive	Unreleased	Sep 7, 2018	Sep 7, 2018	X	
Immortals Fenyx Rising	Action-adventure	Ubisoft Quebec	Ubisoft	Dec 3, 2020	Dec 3, 2020	Dec 3, 2020		
Impact Winter	Adventure	Mojo Bones	Bandai Namco Entertainment	Apr 5, 2018	Apr 5, 2018	Apr 5, 2018		
In Between	Platformer	Gentlymad	Headup Games	Unreleased	Jun 8, 2016	Jun 8, 2016		
In Space We Brawl: Full Arsenal Edition	Shooter	Forge Reply	Forge Reply	Unreleased	Feb 12, 2016	Feb 12, 2016		
In-vert	Platformer	Ternox	Victory Road	Jan 7, 2020	Jan 8, 2020	Jan 7, 2020		
Indivisible	Action role-playing	Lab Zero Games	505 Games	Unreleased	Oct 8, 2019	Oct 11, 2019		
Industry Giant II	Simulation	JoWooD Entertainment	UIG Entertainment	Sep 15, 2017	Dec 20, 2016	Dec 20, 2016		
The Infectious Madness of Doctor Dekker	FMV Adventure	D'Avekki Studios	Wales Interactive	Unreleased	Jun 5, 2018	Jun 5, 2018		
Infernax	Action-adventure	Berzerk Studio	The Arcade Crew	Unreleased	Feb 14, 2022	Feb 14, 2022		
Inferno 2+	Twin-stick shooter	Radiangames	2Awesome Studios	Unreleased	Oct 30, 2019	Oct 30, 2019		
Infinite Adventures	Role-playing game	Stormseeker Games	Stormseeker Games	Oct 30, 2018	Oct 30, 2018	Oct 30, 2018		
Infinite Air with Mark McMorris	Sports	HB Studios	Maximum Games	Oct 24, 2016	Oct 24, 2016	Oct 24, 2016		
Infinite Minigolf	Sport	Zen Studios	Zen Studios	Jul 24, 2017	Jul 24, 2017	Jul 24, 2017		
Infinity Blade Saga	Action	Chair Entertainment Group	Tencent	Feb 1, 2016	Unreleased	Unreleased		
Infinity Runner	Infinite Runner	Wales Interactive	Wales Interactive	Unreleased	Apr 22, 2015	Apr 22, 2015		
Infinium Strike	Tower Defense	Codex Worlds	Codex Worlds	TBA	TBA	TBA		
Infliction: Extended Cut	Horror	Caustic Reality	Blowfish Studios	Feb 25, 2020	Feb 25, 2020	Feb 25, 2020	X	
Initial 2: New Stage	Hack & Slash	E-Home Entertainment	Restory Studio	Jul 17, 2019	Jul 17, 2019	Jul 17, 2019	X	
Injustice 2	Fighting	NetherRealm Studios	Warner Bros. Interactive Entertainment	May 15, 2017	May 15, 2017	May 15, 2017	X	
Ink	Platformer	Zack Bell Games	Digerati	Sep 21, 2017	Sep 21, 2017	Sep 21, 2017		
Inksplosion	Twin stick shooter	Petite Games	Ratalaika Games	Unreleased	May 9, 2018	May 9, 2018		
The Inner Friend	Adventure, Horror	Playmind	Playmind	Apr 27, 2020	Apr 28, 2020	Apr 28, 2020		
The Inner World	Adventure	Studio Fizbin	Headup Games	Mar 31, 2017	Mar 31, 2017	Mar 31, 2017		
The Inner World: The Last Wind Monk	Adventure	Studio Fizbin	Kalypso Media	Oct 24, 2017	Oct 24, 2017	Oct 24, 2017		
InnerSpace	Adventure	PolyKnight Games	Aspyr	Jan 16, 2018	Jan 16, 2018	Jan 16, 2018		
Inops	Puzzle platformer	ZRZStudio	ZRZStudio	Unreleased	Mar 27, 2020	Unreleased		
In Rays of the Light	Action-adventure	Sergey Noskov	Sometimes You	Unreleased	Mar 17, 2021	Mar 17, 2021		
Insane Robots	Roguelike Card Battler	Playniac	Playniac	Unreleased	Jul 13, 2018	Jul 13, 2018	X	
Inside	Puzzle-platformer	Playdead	Playdead	Jun 29, 2016	Jun 29, 2016	Jun 29, 2016		
Inside My Radio	Platforming	Seaven Studio	Iceberg Interactive	Unreleased	Sep 18, 2015	Sep 18, 2015		
Insurgency: Sandstorm	Shooter	New World Interactive	Focus Home Interactive	Unreleased	Sep 29, 2021	Sep 29, 2021		
Into the Belly of the Beast	Action & Adventure	Lucky Brograms	fpsVisionary Software	Unreleased	Jun 22, 2016	Jun 22, 2016		
Inversus Deluxe	Shooter	Hypersect	Hypersect	Unreleased	Oct 3, 2017	Oct 3, 2017		
The Invisible Hours	Adventure	Tequila Works	GameTrust Games	Unreleased	Apr 24, 2018	Apr 24, 2018	X	
iO	Platformer	Gamious	Gamious	Unreleased	Feb 14, 2017	Feb 14, 2017		
Iris.Fall	Puzzle adventure	NExT Studios	PM Studios	Jan 8, 2021	Jan 8, 2021	Jan 8, 2021		
Iro Hero	Shoot 'em up	Artax Games	EastAsiaSoft	Dec 18, 2019	Dec 18, 2019	Dec 18, 2019		
Iron Crypticle	Action-adventure	Confused Pelican	Tikipod	Jul 11, 2017	Jul 11, 2017	Jul 11, 2017		
Iron Harvest	Real-time strategy	King Art Games	Deep Silver	Unreleased	Sep 1, 2020	Sep 1, 2020		
Iron Snout	Brawler	SnoutUp Games	Ratalaika Games	Apr 17, 2019	Apr 17, 2019	Apr 17, 2019		
Iron Wings	Arcade Flight Sim	Naps Team	Naps Team	Oct 5, 2017	Oct 5, 2017	Oct 5, 2017		
Ironcast	Strategy	Dreadbit	Ripstone	Mar 1, 2016	Mar 1, 2016	Mar 1, 2016		
Irony Curtain: From Matryoshka with Love	Adventure	Artifex Mundi	Artifex Mundi	Jun 28, 2019	Jun 28, 2019	Jun 28, 2019	PA X	
It Came from Space and Ate our Brains	Top-down co-op shooter	Triangle Studios	All in! Games	Jan 28, 2020	Jan 28, 2020	Jan 28, 2020		
Ittle Dew 2	Action-adventure	Ludosity	Nicalis	Nov 14, 2016	Nov 14, 2016	Nov 14, 2016		
I, Zombie	Puzzle	Awesome Games Studio	Awesome Games Studio	Sep 1, 2016	Sep 1, 2016	Sep 1, 2016		
Jack Move	Role-playing	So Romantic	HypeTrain Digital	Sep 20, 2022	Sep 20, 2022	Sep 20, 2022		
Jack N Jill DX	Platformer	Ratalaika Games	Ratalaika Games	Unreleased	Sep 26, 2018	Sep 26, 2018		
The Jackbox Naughty Pack	Party; trivia	Jackbox Games	Jackbox Games	Dec 17, 2024	Sep 12, 2024	Sep 12, 2024	PA PC	
The Jackbox Party Pack	Party; trivia	Jackbox Games	Jackbox Games	Unreleased	Nov 19, 2014	Jun 2, 2015		
The Jackbox Party Pack 2	Party; trivia	Jackbox Games	Jackbox Games	Unreleased	Oct 13, 2015	Oct 13, 2015		
The Jackbox Party Pack 3	Party; trivia	Jackbox Games	Jackbox Games	Unreleased	Oct 21, 2016	Oct 21, 2016		
The Jackbox Party Pack 4	Party; trivia	Jackbox Games	Jackbox Games	Unreleased	Oct 20, 2017	Oct 20, 2017		
The Jackbox Party Pack 5	Party; trivia	Jackbox Games	Jackbox Games	Unreleased	Oct 16, 2018	Oct 16, 2018		
The Jackbox Party Pack 6	Party; trivia	Jackbox Games	Jackbox Games	Unreleased	Oct 17, 2019	Oct 17, 2019		
The Jackbox Party Pack 7	Party; trivia	Jackbox Games	Jackbox Games	Unreleased	Oct 15, 2020	Oct 15, 2020		
The Jackbox Party Pack 8	Party; trivia	Jackbox Games	Jackbox Games	Unreleased	Oct 14, 2021	Oct 14, 2021		
The Jackbox Party Pack 9	Party; trivia	Jackbox Games	Jackbox Games	Unreleased	Oct 20, 2022	Oct 20, 2022		
The Jackbox Party Pack 10	Party; trivia	Jackbox Games	Jackbox Games	Oct 19, 2023	Oct 19, 2023	Oct 19, 2023		
The Jackbox Party Pack 11	Party; trivia	Jackbox Games	Jackbox Games	Oct 23, 2025	Oct 23, 2025	Oct 23, 2025		
The Jackbox Party Starter	Party; trivia	Jackbox Games	Jackbox Games	Unreleased	Jun 30, 2022	Jun 30, 2022		
The Jackbox Survey Scramble	Party; trivia	Jackbox Games	Jackbox Games	Oct 24, 2024	Oct 24, 2024	Oct 24, 2024		
JackQuest	Metroidvania	NX Games	Blowfish Studios	Unreleased	Jan 24, 2019	Jan 24, 2019		
Jagged Alliance: Rage!	Turn-based tactics	Cliffhanger Productions	HandyGames	Unreleased	Dec 6, 2018	Dec 6, 2018	X	
Jalopy	Simulation adventure	Minksworks	Excalibur Games	Unreleased	Nov 1, 2019	Nov 1, 2019		
Jay and Silent Bob: Mall Brawl	Beat 'em up	Sponny Bard Productions	Interabang Entertainment	Unreleased	May 20, 2021	May 20, 2021		
Jeopardy!	Card & Board	Frima Studios	Ubisoft	Nov 7, 2017	Nov 7, 2017	Nov 7, 2017		
Jet Car Stunts	Racing	Grip Digital	Grip Digital	May 6, 2014	May 6, 2014	May 6, 2014		
Jettomero: Hero of the Universe	Adventure	Ghost Time Games	Ghost Time Games	Sep 15, 2017	Sep 15, 2017	Sep 15, 2017		
Joe Dever's Lone Wolf	Role-playing	Forge Reply	505 Games	Mar 16, 2016	Mar 16, 2016	Mar 16, 2016		
John Wick Hex	Action; strategy	Bithell Games	Good Shepherd Entertainment	Unreleased	Dec 4, 2020	Dec 4, 2020		
The Journey Down	Point & Click Adventure	Skygoblin	BlitWorks	Unreleased	Jul 6, 2018	Jul 6, 2018		
Journey to the Savage Planet	Action-adventure	Typhoon Studios	505 Games	Jan 28, 2020	Jan 28, 2020	Jan 28, 2020		
Jotun: Valhalla Edition	Action-adventure	Thunder Lotus Games	Thunder Lotus Games	Sep 9, 2016	Sep 9, 2016	Sep 9, 2016		
A Juggler's Tale	Platform	Kaleidoscube	Mixtvision Games	Unreleased	Sep 29, 2021	Sep 29, 2021		
Jujutsu Kaisen: Cursed Clash	Fighting	Byking; Gemdrops	Bandai Namco Entertainment	Feb 1, 2024	Feb 2, 2024	Feb 2, 2024		
Jumanji: Wild Adventures	Platform; Fighting; Adventure	Cradle Games	Outright Games; Namco Bandai	Nov 3, 2023	Nov 3, 2023	Nov 3, 2023		
Jumanji: The Video Game	Adventure	Funsolve	Bandai Namco; Outright Games	Nov 8, 2019	Nov 15, 2019	Nov 15, 2019		
Jump Force	Fighting	Spike Chunsoft	Bandai Namco Entertainment	Feb 15, 2019	Feb 15, 2019	Feb 15, 2019		
Jump Gunners	Arena Platform Shooter	NerdRage Studios	NerdRage Studios	Unreleased	Aug 3, 2018	Aug 3, 2018		
Jump Stars	Action	Pixel Blimp	Curve Digital	Unreleased	Jun 9, 2017	Jun 9, 2017		
Jump, Step, Step	Puzzle	Thang Phung Dinh	Thunder Cloud Studio	Aug 11, 2017	Aug 11, 2017	Aug 11, 2017		
JumpJet Rex	Action & Adventure	TreeFortress Games	Loot Interactive	Apr 29, 2016	Apr 29, 2016	Apr 29, 2016		
Jurassic World Evolution	Business simulation	Frontier Developments	Frontier Developments	Jun 12, 2018	Jun 12, 2018	Jun 12, 2018		
Just Cause 3	Third-person shooter; action-adventure; open world	Avalanche Studios	Square Enix	Jan 21, 2016	Dec 1, 2015	Dec 1, 2015		
Just Cause 4	Action-adventure	Avalanche Studios	Square Enix	Dec 4, 2018	Dec 4, 2018	Dec 4, 2018	X	
Just Dance 2014	Rhythm	Ubisoft Paris	Ubisoft	Unreleased	Nov 22, 2013	Nov 22, 2013	K	
Just Dance 2015	Rhythm	Ubisoft Paris	Ubisoft	Unreleased	Oct 21, 2014	Oct 24, 2014	K	
Just Dance 2016	Rhythm	Ubisoft Paris	Ubisoft	Unreleased	Oct 20, 2015	Oct 22, 2015	K	
Just Dance 2017	Rhythm	Ubisoft Paris	Ubisoft	Unreleased	Oct 25, 2016	Oct 27, 2016	K	
Just Dance 2018	Rhythm	Ubisoft Paris	Ubisoft	Unreleased	Oct 24, 2017	Oct 27, 2017	K	
Just Dance 2019	Rhythm	Ubisoft Paris	Ubisoft	Unreleased	Oct 23, 2018	Oct 25, 2018	K	
Just Dance 2020	Rhythm	Ubisoft Paris	Ubisoft	Unreleased	Nov 5, 2019	Nov 5, 2019	K	
Just Dance 2021	Rhythm	Ubisoft Paris	Ubisoft	Unreleased	Nov 12, 2020	Nov 12, 2020	K	
Just Dance 2022	Rhythm	Ubisoft Paris	Ubisoft	Unreleased	Nov 4, 2021	Nov 4, 2021	K	
Just Dance: Disney Party 2	Rhythm	Ubisoft San Francisco	Ubisoft	Unreleased	Oct 20, 2015	Oct 20, 2015	K	
Just Die Already	Action-adventure	DoubleMoose	Curve Digital	Unreleased	May 20, 2021	May 20, 2021		
Just Ignore Them	Horror adventure	Stranga Games; Grab The Games	Ratalaika Games	Oct 16, 2019	Oct 16, 2019	Oct 16, 2019		
Just Sing	Rhythm	iNiS Corporation	Ubisoft	Unreleased	Sep 14, 2016	Sep 14, 2016		
Jydge	Shooter	10tons	10tons	Unreleased	Oct 5, 2017	Oct 5, 2017		
Kaiju Panic	Strategy	Mechabit	Mechabit	Oct 9, 2015	Oct 9, 2015	Oct 9, 2015		
Kalimba!	Platformer, Puzzle, Side-scroller	Press Play	Xbox Game Studios	Dec 17, 2014	Dec 17, 2014	Dec 17, 2014		
Kamiko	Action-adventure	Skipmore; Esquadra	Flyhigh Works	Aug 27, 2019	Aug 28, 2019	Aug 27, 2019		
Kao the Kangaroo	Platform	Tate Multimedia	Tate Multimedia	May 27, 2022	May 27, 2022	May 27, 2022		
Katamari Damacy Reroll	Puzzle; action	Bandai Namco Entertainment	Bandai Namco Entertainment	Nov 19, 2020	Nov 20, 2020	Nov 20, 2020		
Katana Zero	Platformer, Hack and Slash	Askiisoft	Devolver Digital	Oct 15, 2020	Oct 15, 2020	Oct 15, 2020		
Kaze and the Wild Masks	Platform	PixelHive	Soedesco	Unreleased	Mar 26, 2021	Mar 26, 2021		
Kentucky Route Zero: TV Edition	Adventure	Cardboard Computer	Annapurna Interactive	Apr 30, 2020	Jan 28, 2020	Jan 28, 2020		
Keep Talking and Nobody Explodes	Co-op puzzle, Party	Steel Crate	Steel Crate	Aug 17, 2018	Aug 17, 2018	Aug 17, 2018	X	
Kerbal Space Program	Space flight simulator, sandbox	Squad; Flying Tiger	Private Division	Jan 16, 2018	Jan 16, 2018	Jan 16, 2018		
Kholat	Survival horror	Imgn.Pro	Imgn.Pro	Jun 9, 2017	Jun 9, 2017	Jun 9, 2017		
Kick & Fennick	Action & Adventure, Platformer	Abstraction Games	Abstraction Games	Jun 3, 2016	Jun 3, 2016	Jun 3, 2016		
KickBeat: Special Edition	Music, rhythm	Zen Studios	Zen Studios	Sep 26, 2014	Sep 26, 2014	Sep 26, 2014		
Kill It With Fire	Simulation	Case Donnella Games	tinyBuild	Mar 4, 2021	Mar 4, 2021	Mar 4, 2021		
Kill the Bad Guy	Strategy, Puzzle	Exkee	Plug In Digital	Jan 31, 2017	Jan 31, 2017	Jan 31, 2017		
Killer Queen Black	Platformer	Liquid Bit	Liquid Bit	Feb 22, 2021	Feb 22, 2021	Feb 22, 2021		
Killing Floor 2	First-person shooter	Tripwire Interactive	Iceberg Interactive	Aug 29, 2017	Aug 29, 2017	Aug 29, 2017	X	
Kine	Puzzle	Gwen Frey	Chump Squad	Oct 17, 2019	Oct 17, 2019	Oct 17, 2019	X	
Kinect Rush: A Disney•Pixar Adventure	Open World, Adventure	Asobo Studio	Xbox Game Studios	Oct 31, 2017	Oct 31, 2017	Oct 31, 2017	PA X K	
Kinect Sports Rivals	Sports, Motion Controlled	Rare	Xbox Game Studios	Sep 4, 2014	Apr 8, 2014	Apr 11, 2014	K	
The King's Bird	Action	Serenity Forge	Graffiti Games	Unreleased	Feb 12, 2019	Feb 12, 2019		
King's Bounty II	Tactical role-playing	1C Entertainment	Prime Matter	Unreleased	Aug 24, 2021	Aug 24, 2021		
King's Guard TD	Strategy, Tower Defense	R.G.B.	R.G.B.	Sep 7, 2018	Sep 7, 2018	Sep 7, 2018		
King's Quest	Action & Adventure	The Odd Gentlemen	Sierra Entertainment	Jul 29, 2015	Jul 29, 2015	Jul 29, 2015		
King Oddball	Puzzle	10tons	10tons	Sep 8, 2016	Sep 8, 2016	Sep 8, 2016		
King of Seas	Action-role playing	3DClouds	Team17	Unreleased	May 25, 2021	May 25, 2021		
Kingdom Come: Deliverance	Action role-playing; Open world	Warhorse Studios	Deep Silver	Unreleased	Feb 13, 2018	Feb 13, 2018	X	
Kingdom Hearts HD 2.8 Final Chapter Prologue	Action role-playing anthology	Square Enix	Square Enix	Unreleased	Feb 19, 2020	Feb 17, 2020		
Kingdom Hearts III	Action role-playing	Square Enix	Square Enix	Jan 29, 2019	Jan 29, 2019	Jan 29, 2019	X	
Kingdom Hearts: Melody of Memory	Action role-playing	Square Enix	Square Enix	Nov 11, 2020	Nov 13, 2020	Nov 13, 2020		
Kingdom of Night	Action role-playing	Black Seven Studios	Dangen Entertainment	2022	2022	2022		
Kingdom: New Lands	Strategy, Simulation	Noio	Raw Fury	Unreleased	Aug 9, 2016	Aug 9, 2016		
Kingdom: Two Crowns	Strategy, Simulation	Noio	Raw Fury	Dec 11, 2018	Dec 11, 2018	Dec 11, 2018	X	
Kingmaker: Rise to the Throne	Adventure, Hidden object game	Cordelia Games	Artifex Mundi	Unreleased	Dec 14, 2018	Dec 14, 2018	X	
Kitty Powers' Matchmaker	Simulation	Magic Notion	Stellar Entertainment Software	Unreleased	Mar 10, 2017	Mar 10, 2017		
Knee Deep	Adventure	Prologue Games	Wales Interactive	Feb 3, 2017	Feb 3, 2017	Feb 3, 2017		
Knight Squad	Top-down shooter	Chainsawesome Games	Chainsawesome Games	Nov 17, 2015	Nov 17, 2015	Nov 17, 2015		
Knight Squad 2	Top-down shooter	Chainsawesome Games	Chainsawesome Games	Apr 14, 2021	Apr 14, 2021	Apr 14, 2021		
Knightin'+	Action-adventure	Muzt Die Studios	Ratalaika Games	Feb 19, 2020	Feb 19, 2020	Feb 19, 2020		
Knights of Pen & Paper +1 Deluxier Edition	Role-playing	Behold Studios	Plug In Digital	Unreleased	May 30, 2018	May 30, 2018		
Knights of Pen & Paper 2 Deluxiest Edition	Role-playing	Behold Studios; Seaven Studio; Kyy Games	Plug In Digital	Dec 14, 2018	Dec 14, 2018	Dec 14, 2018		
A Knight's Quest	Action-adventure	Sky9 Games	Curve Digital	Oct 10, 2019	Oct 11, 2019	Oct 11, 2019		
Knock-Knock	Horror	Ice-Pick Lodge	Ice-Pick Lodge	Aug 23, 2017	Aug 23, 2017	Aug 23, 2017		
Knockout City	Sports	Velan Studios	Electronic Arts	May 21, 2021	May 21, 2021	May 21, 2021		
Kona	Adventure Survival	Parabole	Parabole	Mar 17, 2017	Mar 17, 2017	Mar 17, 2017		
Korgan	Adventure	codestalkers	codestalkers	Apr 27, 2018	Apr 27, 2018	Apr 27, 2018		
Krinkle Krusher	Action & Adventure	Ilusis Interactive Graphics	Ilusis Interactive Graphics	Feb 5, 2016	Feb 5, 2016	Feb 5, 2016		
Kung Fu for Kinect	Family, Motion Controlled	Virtual Air Guitar Company	Virtual Air Guitar Company	Unreleased	Jun 24, 2016	Jun 24, 2016	K	
Kung Fu Panda: Showdown of Legendary Legends	Fighting	Vicious Cycle Software	Little Orbit	Unreleased	Dec 1, 2015	Nov 27, 2015		
Kunio-kun: The World Classics Collection	Various	Arc System Works	Arc System Works	Dec 20, 2018	Unreleased	Unreleased		
Kyub	Platformer	Ninja Egg	Ninja Egg	Jul 13, 2016	Jul 13, 2016	Jul 13, 2016		
Kyurinaga's Revenge	Action & Adventure	Reco Technology	Reco Technology	Unreleased	Oct 24, 2016	Oct 24, 2016		
LA Cops	Action	Modern Dream	Team17	Unreleased	Mar 13, 2015	Mar 13, 2015		
L.A. Noire	Action-adventure	Team Bondi	Rockstar Games	Nov 14, 2017	Nov 14, 2017	Nov 14, 2017	X	
La-Mulana	Platform; metroidvania	Nigoro	Nippon Ichi Software	Unreleased	Mar 17, 2020	Mar 20, 2020		
La-Mulana 2	Platform; metroidvania	Nigoro	Nippon Ichi Software	Unreleased	Mar 17, 2020	Mar 20, 2020		
Laika: Aged Through Blood	Metroidvania	Brainwash Gang	Headup Games	Dec 5, 2023	Dec 5, 2023	Dec 5, 2023		
The Language of Love	Visual novel	ebi-hime	Ratalaika Games	Unreleased	Oct 30, 2020	Oct 30, 2020		
Lake Ridden	Adventure	Midnight Hub	Midnight Hub	Unreleased	Jan 3, 2020	Jan 3, 2020		
Land It!	Simulation	Nemesys Games	Nemesys Games	Unreleased	Jun 22, 2016	Jun 22, 2016		
Lara Croft and the Temple of Osiris	Platformer; action	Crystal Dynamics	Square Enix	Dec 25, 2014	Dec 9, 2014	Dec 9, 2014		
Laser League	Sports	Roll7	505 Games	Unreleased	May 10, 2018	May 10, 2018		
Laserlife	Shooter	Choice Provisions	Choice Provisions	Unreleased	Sep 22, 2015	Sep 22, 2015		
The Last Campfire	Adventure, puzzle	Hello Games	Hello Games	Aug 27, 2020	Aug 27, 2020	Aug 27, 2020		
The Last Case of Benedict Fox	Metroidvania	Plot Twist	Rogue Games	Apr 27, 2023	Apr 27, 2023	Apr 27, 2023		
The Last Cube	Adventure, puzzle	Improx Games	Improx Games	2022	2022	2022		
The Last Door	Horror; adventure	Game Kitchen	Plug In Digital	Unreleased	May 22, 2019	May 22, 2019		
The Last Night	Adventure	Odd Tales	Raw Fury	TBA	TBA	TBA		
The Last Kids on Earth and the Staff of Doom	Action	Stage Clear Studios	Outright Games	Unreleased	Jun 3, 2021	Jun 3, 2021		
Last Oasis	Survival; MMO	Donkey Crew	Donkey Crew	Mar 26, 2021	Mar 26, 2021	Mar 26, 2021		
The Last Stand: Aftermath	Roguelike	Con Artist Games	Armor Games Studios	2022	2022	2022		
Last Stop	Adventure	Variable State	Annapurna Interactive	Jul 22, 2021	Jul 22, 2021	Jul 22, 2021		
Lastfight	Fighting	PiranaKing	PiranaKing	Unreleased	Sep 19, 2016	Sep 19, 2016		
Late Shift	FMV, Adventure	CtrlMovies	Wales Interactive	Unreleased	Apr 18, 2017	Apr 18, 2017		
Layers of Fear	Horror	Bloober Team	Bloober Team	Feb 27, 2017	Feb 16, 2016	Feb 16, 2016		
Layers of Fear 2	Horror	Bloober Team	Bloober Team	Unreleased	May 28, 2019	May 28, 2019		
Lazy Galaxy: Rebel Story	Roguelite; shoot 'em up	Coldwind Games	Coldwind Games	Unreleased	Dec 14, 2018	Dec 14, 2018		
The Legend of el Lobodestroyo vs. la Liga de los Villanos	Action-adventure; platformer	Lefhanded Studios	Lefhanded Studios	Unreleased	TBA	TBA		
The Legend of Korra	Action-adventure	PlatinumGames	Activision	Unreleased	Oct 22, 2014	Oct 22, 2014		
Legend of the Skyfish	Puzzle	Crescent Moon Games; Mgaia Studio	Kemco	Aug 29, 2019	Aug 29, 2019	Aug 29, 2019		
Legend of the Tetrachs	Japanese role-playing	Hit Point	Kemco	May 8, 2019	May 8, 2019	May 8, 2019		
Legendary Eleven	Sports	Eclipse Games	Eclipse Games	Unreleased	Jan 4, 2019	Jan 4, 2019		
Lego Batman 3: Beyond Gotham	Action-adventure	TT Games	Warner Bros. Interactive Entertainment	Unreleased	Nov 11, 2014	Nov 14, 2014		
Lego Brawls	Action-adventure	Red games	Bandai Namco Entertainment	Sep 2, 2022	Sep 2, 2022	Sep 2, 2022		
Lego City Undercover	Action-adventure	TT Games	Warner Bros. Interactive Entertainment	Unreleased	Apr 4, 2017	Apr 7, 2017		
Lego DC Super-Villains	Action-adventure	TT Games	Warner Bros. Interactive Entertainment	Unreleased	Oct 16, 2018	Oct 19, 2018	X	
Lego Dimensions	Action-adventure	TT Games	Warner Bros. Interactive Entertainment	Unreleased	Sep 27, 2015	Sep 29, 2015		
Lego Harry Potter Collection	Action-adventure	TT Games	Warner Bros. Interactive Entertainment	Unreleased	Oct 30, 2018	Oct 30, 2018	X	
Lego Jurassic World	Action-adventure	TT Games	Warner Bros. Interactive Entertainment	Unreleased	Jun 12, 2015	Jun 12, 2015		
Lego Marvel Super Heroes	Action-adventure	TT Games	Warner Bros. Interactive Entertainment	Unreleased	Nov 22, 2013	Nov 29, 2013		
Lego Marvel Super Heroes 2	Action-adventure	TT Games	Warner Bros. Interactive Entertainment	Feb 1, 2018	Nov 14, 2017	Nov 14, 2017		
Lego Marvel's Avengers	Action-adventure	TT Games	Warner Bros. Interactive Entertainment	Unreleased	Jan 26, 2016	Jan 26, 2016		
Lego Movie Videogame	Action-adventure	TT Games	Warner Bros. Interactive Entertainment	Unreleased	Feb 7, 2014	Feb 14, 2014		
Lego Movie Videogame 2	Action-adventure	TT Games	Warner Bros. Interactive Entertainment	Unreleased	Feb 26, 2019	Feb 28, 2019		
Lego Ninjago Movie Video Game	Action-adventure	TT Games	Warner Bros. Interactive Entertainment	Oct 20, 2017	Sep 22, 2017	Oct 20, 2017		
Lego Star Wars: The Force Awakens	Action-adventure	TT Games	Warner Bros. Interactive Entertainment	Unreleased	Jun 28, 2016	Jun 28, 2016		
Lego Star Wars: The Skywalker Saga	Action-adventure	TT Games	Warner Bros. Interactive Entertainment	Apr 5, 2022	Apr 5, 2022	Apr 5, 2022		
Lego The Hobbit	Action-adventure	TT Games	Warner Bros. Interactive Entertainment	Unreleased	Apr 8, 2014	Apr 11, 2014		
Lego The Incredibles	Action-adventure	TT Games	Warner Bros. Interactive Entertainment	Unreleased	Jun 15, 2018	Jun 13, 2018		
Lego Worlds	Action-adventure	TT Games	Warner Bros. Interactive Entertainment	Mar 7, 2017	Mar 7, 2017	Mar 7, 2017		
Legrand Legacy: Tale of the Fatebounds	Role-playing	Semisoft	Another Indie	Unreleased	Oct 3, 2019	Oct 3, 2019		
Leisure Suit Larry: Wet Dreams Don't Dry	Adventure	CrazyBunch	Assemble Entertainment	Unreleased	Sep 15, 2020	Sep 15, 2020		
Leisure Suit Larry: Wet Dreams Dry Twice	Adventure	CrazyBunch	Assemble Entertainment	Unreleased	May 18, 2021	May 18, 2021		
Lemnis Gate	First-person shooter	Ratloop Games Canada	Frontier Foundry	Unreleased	Sep 28, 2021	Sep 28, 2021		
Leo's Fortune	Action-adventure	Tilting Point	1337 & Senri	Sep 11, 2015	Sep 11, 2015	Sep 11, 2015		
Let Them Come	Shooter	Tuatara Games	Versus Evil	Oct 3, 2017	Oct 3, 2017	Oct 3, 2017		
Lethal League	Fighting	Team Reptile	Team Reptile	May 10, 2017	May 10, 2017	May 10, 2017		
Lethal League Blaze	Fighting	Team Reptile	JP: Oizumi Amuzio; WW: Team Reptile	Jul 12, 2019	Jul 12, 2019	Jul 12, 2019		
Let's Sing Country	Music	Voxler	Deep Silver	Unreleased	Oct 25, 2019	Unreleased		
Letter Quest: Grimm's Journey Remastered	Puzzle	Bacon Bandit Games	Digerati	Unreleased	Apr 8, 2016	Apr 8, 2016		
Level 22	Action-adventure	Moving Player	Moving Player	Unreleased	Jan 29, 2016	Jan 29, 2016		
Lichdom: Battlemage	Action & Adventure	Xaviant	Maximum Games	Unreleased	Apr 19, 2016	Apr 19, 2016		
Lifeless Planet: Premier Edition	Action-adventure	Stage 2 Studios	Stage 2 Studios	Unreleased	May 13, 2015	May 13, 2015		
Life Is Strange	Adventure	Dontnod Entertainment	Square Enix	Unreleased	Jan 19, 2016	Jan 22, 2016		
Life Is Strange 2	Adventure	Dontnod Entertainment	Square Enix	Mar 25, 2020	Sep 27, 2018	Sep 27, 2018	X	
Life Is Strange: Before the Storm	Adventure	Deck Nine	Square Enix	May 30, 2018	Aug 31, 2017	Aug 31, 2017	X	
Life Is Strange: True Colors	Adventure	Deck Nine	Square Enix	Sep 10, 2021	Sep 10, 2021	Sep 10, 2021		
Light Fairytale Episode 1	Japanese role-playing	Neko Works	Neko Works	Sep 13, 2019	Sep 13, 2019	Sep 13, 2019	X	
Light Fall	Platformer	Bishop Games	Bishop Games	TBA	TBA	TBA		
Lightfield	Racing	Lost in the Garden	Lost in the Garden	Sep 26, 2017	Sep 26, 2017	Sep 26, 2017		
Like a Dragon: Infinite Wealth	Role-playing	Ryu Ga Gotoku Studio	Sega	Jan 26, 2024	Jan 26, 2024	Jan 26, 2024		
Like a Dragon: Ishin!	Action-adventure; hack and slash	Ryu Ga Gotoku Studio	Sega	Feb 21, 2023	Feb 21, 2023	Feb 21, 2023		
Like a Dragon: Pirate Yakuza in Hawaii	Action-adventure	Ryu Ga Gotoku Studio	Sega	Feb 21, 2025	Feb 21, 2025	Feb 21, 2025		
Like a Dragon Gaiden: The Man Who Erased His Name	Action-adventure	Ryu Ga Gotoku Studio	Sega	Nov 9, 2023	Nov 9, 2023	Nov 9, 2023		
Lil' Guardsman	Puzzle	Hilltop Studios	Versus Evil, TinyBuild	Unreleased	Jan 23, 2024	Jan 23, 2024		
Lilith-M	Adventure, Puzzle	Chesstar Studios	E-Home Entertainment	Sep 26, 2017	Sep 26, 2017	Sep 26, 2017		
Lily's Epic Quest for Lost Gems	Puzzle, Casual	Studio Craft Development	Studio Craft Development	Unreleased	May 16, 2018	May 16, 2018		
Limbo	Platformer	Playdead	Playdead	Dec 5, 2014	Dec 5, 2014	Dec 5, 2014		
Line of Defense Tactics	Strategy	3000AD	3000AD	Unreleased	Dec 11, 2015	Dec 11, 2015		
Lisa: Definitive Edition	Role-playing	Dingaling Productions	Serenity Forge	Unreleased	Jul 18, 2023	Jul 18, 2023		
The Little Acre	Point & Click Adventure	Pewter Games Studios	Pewter Games Studios	Dec 13, 2016	Dec 13, 2016	Dec 13, 2016		
Little Kitty, Big City	Adventure	Double Dagger Studio	Double Dagger Studio	May 9, 2024	May 9, 2024	May 9, 2024	PA PC	
Little Nightmares	Puzzle-platformer	Tarsier Studios	Bandai Namco Entertainment	Apr 28, 2017	Apr 28, 2017	Apr 28, 2017		
Little Nightmares II	Action-adventure	Tarsier Studios	Bandai Namco Entertainment	Feb 11, 2021	Feb 11, 2021	Feb 11, 2021	P	
Little Nightmares III	Action-adventure	Suppermassive Games	Bandai Namco Entertainment	Oct 10, 2025	Oct 10, 2025	Oct 10, 2025		
Little Town Hero	Role-playing	Game Freak	Game Freak	Jun 23, 2020	Jun 23, 2020	Jun 23, 2020		
Little Triangle	Platformer, Battle Royale	CottonGame	Dreamoji	Unreleased	Feb 7, 2018	Feb 7, 2018	PA	
Little Misfortune	Adventure	Killmonday Games	Killmonday Games	May 29, 2020	May 29, 2020	May 29, 2020	X	
Livelock	Top Down Shooter, Action role-playing	Tuque Games	Perfect World Entertainment	Unreleased	Aug 29, 2016	Aug 29, 2016		
The Living Dungeon	Board Game	RadiationBurn	RadiationBurn	Unreleased	Jan 29, 2016	Jan 29, 2016		
Lock's Quest	Strategy	Digital Continue	THQ Nordic	May 30, 2017	May 30, 2017	May 30, 2017		
LocoCycle	Racing, Vehicular combat	Twisted Pixel Games	Xbox Game Studios	Sep 4, 2014	Nov 22, 2013	Nov 22, 2013		
Lonely Mountains: Downhill	Sports, Racing	Megagon Industries	Thunderfall Publishing	Oct 23, 2019	Oct 23, 2019	Oct 23, 2019	PA	
The Long Dark	Survival	Hinterland Studio	Hinterland Studio	Aug 1, 2017	Aug 1, 2017	Aug 1, 2017	PA	
The Long Journey Home	Roguelike space simulation	Daedalic West	Daedalic Entertainment	Unreleased	Nov 14, 2018	Nov 14, 2018		
The Long Reach	Adventure, Horror	Painted Black Games	Merge Games	Unreleased	Jul 18, 2018	Jul 18, 2018		
Looney Tunes: Wacky World of Sports	Arcade; fitness; outdoors; party; sports	Bamtang Games	GameMill Entertainment	Unreleased	Sep 27, 2024	Sep 27, 2024		
The Lord of the Rings: Adventure Card Game	Collectible card game	Black Shamrock	Asmodee Digital	Nov 5, 2019	Nov 5, 2019	Nov 5, 2019	X	
Lords of the Fallen	Action role-playing	Deck13	City Interactive	Unreleased	Oct 28, 2014	Oct 31, 2014		
Lornsword Winter Chronicle	Action-strategy	Tower Five	Tower Five	Oct 23, 2019	Oct 23, 2019	Oct 23, 2019		
Lost Artifacts: Soulstone	Casual strategy	GameOn Productions	8floor	Unreleased	Feb 13, 2019	Feb 13, 2019		
Lost Artifacts: Time Machine	Casual strategy	GameOn Productions	8floor	Unreleased	Oct 11, 2019	Oct 11, 2019		
Lost Ember	Action-adventure	Mooneye Studios	Mooneye Studios	Nov 22, 2019	Nov 22, 2019	Nov 22, 2019		
Lost Grimoires: Stolen Kingdom	Hidden object adventure	Artifex Mundi	Artifex Mundi	Unreleased	Apr 28, 2017	Apr 28, 2017		
Lost Grimoires 2: Shard of Mystery	Adventure	Artifex Mundi	Artifex Mundi	Unreleased	Dec 14, 2017	Dec 14, 2017		
Lost in Random	Action-adventure	Zoink	Electronic Arts	Sep 10, 2021	Sep 10, 2021	Sep 10, 2021		
Lost Judgment	Action-adventure	Ryu Ga Gotoku Studio	Sega	Sep 24, 2021	Sep 24, 2021	Sep 24, 2021		
The Lost Legends of Redwall: The Scout	Action-adventure	Soma Games	Soma Games	Jun 28, 2019	Jun 28, 2019	Jun 28, 2019		
Lost Ruins	Survival	Altari Games	Dangen Entertainment	Unreleased	2022	2022		
Lost Orbit: Terminal Edition	Action	Pixelnauts Games	Pixelnauts Games	Unreleased	Jul 16, 2019	Jul 16, 2019		
Lost Sea	Action-adventure	EastAsiaSoft	EastAsiaSoft	Unreleased	Jun 29, 2016	Jun 29, 2016		
Lost Words: Beyond the Page	Puzzle, Platformer	Sketchbook Games	Modus Games	Apr 6, 2021	Apr 6, 2021	Apr 6, 2021		
Lovecraft's Untold Stories	Action role-playing	Blini Games	Badland Publishing	May 10, 2019	May 10, 2019	May 10, 2019		
Lovely Planet	Shooter	OuickTequila	TinyBuild	Unreleased	Jan 8, 2016	Jan 8, 2016		
Lovers in a Dangerous Spacetime	2D platform, shooter	Asteroid Base	Asteroid Base	Unreleased	Sep 9, 2015	Sep 9, 2015		
Lumini	Action-adventure	Speelbaars	2Awesome Studio	Jan 22, 2020	Jan 22, 2020	Jan 22, 2020		
Lumo	Platformer	Rising Star Games	Rising Star Games	Unreleased	Jun 22, 2016	Jun 22, 2016		
Lumines Remastered	Puzzle	Resonair	Enhance Games	Unreleased	Jun 26, 2018	Jun 26, 2018		
Lunar Remastered Collection	Role-playing	Game Arts	GungHo Online Entertainment	Apr 18, 2025	Apr 18, 2025	Apr 18, 2025		

== Free-to-play ==
Title	Genre(s)	Developer(s)	Publisher(s)	Release date			Addons	Ref.
Title	Genre(s)	Developer(s)	Publisher(s)	JP	EU	NA	Addons	Ref.
3on3 FreeStyle	Sports	Joycity	Joycity	Aug 29, 2018	Aug 29, 2018	Aug 29, 2018		
A King's Tale: Final Fantasy XV	Action	Empty Clip Studios	Square Enix	Nov 29, 2016	Nov 29, 2016	Nov 29, 2016		
Adventure Pop	Puzzle	Tic Toc Games	505 Games	Unreleased	Feb 7, 2017	Feb 7, 2017		
AirMech Arena	Action; adventure	Carbon Games	Ubisoft	May 12, 2015	May 12, 2015	May 12, 2015		
Apex Legends	Battle royale	Respawn Entertainment	Electronic Arts	Feb 4, 2019	Feb 4, 2019	Feb 4, 2019	X	
APB: Reloaded	Action-adventure; third-person shooter	Reloaded Studios	Reloaded Studios	Jun 3, 2016	Jun 3, 2016	Jun 3, 2016		
Armored Warfare	Vehicular combat	Saber Interactive	My.com	Unreleased	Aug 2, 2018	Aug 2, 2018		
Asphalt Legends	Racing	Gameloft Barcelona	Gameloft	Aug 31, 2021	Aug 31, 2021	Aug 31, 2021	CP	
Battle Ages	Real-time strategy	DR Studios	505 Games	Apr 20, 2016	Apr 20, 2016	Apr 20, 2016		
Battle Islands	Real-time strategy	DR Studios	505 Games	Oct 9, 2015	Oct 9, 2015	Oct 9, 2015		
Battle Islands: Commanders	Real-time strategy	DR Studios	505 Games	Unreleased	Feb 13, 2017	Feb 13, 2017		
Ben-Hur	Racing; action	Float Hybrid; Krome Studios	AOL	Unreleased	Unreleased	Aug 9, 2016		
Bless Unleashed	MMORPG	Neowiz Round 8 Studio	Bandai Namco	Unreleased	Mar 12, 2020	Mar 12, 2020	X	
Brawlhalla	Fighting	Blue Mammoth Games	Ubisoft	Unreleased	Nov 6, 2018	Nov 6, 2018	X	
Century: Age of Ashes	Action	Playwing	Playwing	Jul 12, 2022	Jul 12, 2022	Jul 12, 2022		
Clicker Heroes	Idle	Playsaurus	BlitWorks	Mar 10, 2017	Mar 10, 2017	Mar 10, 2017		
Crossout	Massively multiplayer online	Targem Games	Gaijin Entertainment	May 30, 2017	May 30, 2017	May 30, 2017		
Darwin Project	Arena; survival	Scavenger Studio	Scavenger Studio	Unreleased	Jan 14, 2020	Jan 14, 2020	PA	
Dauntless	Massively multiplayer online	Phoenix Labs	Epic Games	Unreleased	May 21, 2019	May 21, 2019	X	
DC Universe Online	Massively multiplayer online	Daybreak Games	Daybreak Games	Apr 29, 2016	Apr 29, 2016	Apr 29, 2016		
Defiance 2050	Action role-playing; massively multiplayer online	Trion Worlds	Trion Worlds	Jul 6, 2018	Jul 6, 2018	Jul 6, 2018		
Disney Speedstorm	Racing	Gameloft Barcelona	Gameloft	Sep 28, 2023	Sep 28, 2023	Sep 28, 2023	CP	
Dungeon Defenders II	Tower defense	Trendy Entertainment	Reverb Triple XP	Jun 20, 2017	Jun 20, 2017	Jun 20, 2017		
eFootball 2022	Sports	Konami	Konami	Sep 30, 2021	Sep 30, 2021	Sep 30, 2021		
Eternal	Collectible card	Dire Wolf Digital	Dire Wolf Digital	Nov 20, 2018	Nov 21, 2018	Nov 21, 2018	PA	
Fable Fortune	Card battler	Flaming Fowl Studios	Mediatonic	Feb 22, 2018	Feb 22, 2018	Feb 22, 2018	PA PC	
Fallout Shelter	Strategy; simulation; survival	Bethesda Game Studios	Bethesda Softworks	Feb 7, 2017	Feb 7, 2017	Feb 7, 2017	PA	
Fortnite	Survival; battle royale; sandbox	Epic Games	Epic Games	Apr 25, 2019	Jul 25, 2017	Jul 25, 2017		
Frozen Free Fall: Snowball Fight	Puzzle	SuperVillain Studios	Disney Interactive	Sep 15, 2015	Sep 15, 2015	Sep 15, 2015		
Gems of War	Puzzle; role-playing	Infinite Interactive	505 Games	Unreleased	Nov 11, 2015	Nov 11, 2015		
Gigantic	Action; multiplayer online battle arena	Motiga	Perfect World	Jul 20, 2017	Jul 20, 2017	Jul 20, 2017	PA PC	
Growtopia	MMO Sandbox	Ubisoft	Ubisoft	Unreleased	Jul 18, 2019	Jul 18, 2019		
Gwent: The Witcher Card Game	Collectible card	CD Projekt Red	CD Projekt Red	Unreleased	Dec 4, 2018	Dec 4, 2018	PA PC	
Hand of the Gods: Smite Tactics	Turn-based strategy	Hi-Rez Studios	Hi-Rez Studios	Feb 21, 2018	Feb 21, 2018	Feb 21, 2018		
Happy Dungeons	Action; tactical role-playing	Toylogic	Toylogic	Oct 4, 2016	Oct 4, 2016	Oct 4, 2016		
Happy Wars	Action; tactical role-playing	Toylogic	Toylogic	Apr 24, 2015	Apr 24, 2015	Apr 24, 2015		
Hawken	Shooter; mech sim	Reloaded Games	505 Games	Jul 8, 2016	Jul 8, 2016	Jul 8, 2016		
Hyper Universe	Multiplayer online battle arena	CWave	Nexon America	Unreleased	Aug 7, 2018	Aug 7, 2018	X	
Idle Champions of the Forgotten Realms	Casual	Codename Entertainment	Codename Entertainment	Unreleased	Dec 14, 2018	Dec 14, 2018		
Killer Instinct	Fighting	Double Helix Games; Iron Galaxy Studios	Xbox Game Studios	Sep 4, 2014	Nov 22, 2013	Nov 22, 2013	PA PC	
Lies of Astaroth	Card battler	IFree Studio	IFree Studio	Apr 9, 2015	Aug 12, 2016	Aug 12, 2016		

== See also ==
- List of Xbox One games (M–Z)
- List of best-selling Xbox One video games
- List of backward-compatible games for Xbox One and Series X/S
- List of Xbox One X enhanced games
- List of Xbox One and Series X/S applications
- List of Xbox Play Anywhere games
- List of Xbox Live games on Windows 10
