= Magician Lord =

1990 video game

- Developer: Alpha Denshi
- Publishers: SNK; Neo Geo CD; JP: ADK; UK: New Generation; BRA: Neo Geo do Brasil; NA: SNK
- Producer: Akira Ushizawa
- Programmer: Yukinori Nishikata
- Artists: Akira Ushizawa; Shinji Moriyama
- Composers: Hideki Yamamoto; Hiroaki Shimizu; Yuka Watanabe
- Platforms: Arcade; Neo Geo AES; Neo Geo CD
- Release: Arcade: JP: April 26, 1990; NA: April 1990; Neo Geo AES: JP/NA: July 1, 1991; UK: February 1992; Neo Geo CD: JP: October 31, 1994; UK: November 1994; BRA: April 6, 1995; NA: October 1996
- Genre: Action
- Modes: Single-player, multiplayer
- Arcade system: Neo Geo MVS

Magician Lord (Note: Japanese: マジシャンロード, Hepburn: Majishan Rōdo) is a 1990 action video game developed by Alpha Denshi. It was one of the first four arcade games released by SNK for the Neo Geo Multi Video System (MVS) and a pack-in game for the Neo Geo Advanced Entertainment System (AES) home console. The plot follows Elta, a descendant of the "Magician Lord", on a journey across the land of Cadacis to find eight grimoires and seal the demon Gal Agiese before he can resurrect the god of destruction Az Atorse. The player controls Elta, who can transform into different beings by collecting elemental orbs.

Magician Lord was the first Neo Geo game produced by Akira Ushizawa, who had previously worked on Alpha Denshi titles such as Time Soldiers (1987), Sky Soldiers (1988), and Sky Adventure (1989). The team designed the game with the intention of releasing it on home consoles and, initially, during location testing, it was easier, but the team felt that would be boring and increased the difficulty for the final release. The soundtrack was scored Hideki Yamamoto, Hiroaki Shimizu, and Yuka Watanabe.

Magician Lord proved popular among North American arcade players and received generally favorable reviews. Critics praised the graphics, sound, and transformation mechanic. Many publications noted its difficulty, and some had mixed opinions on its gameplay, while criticism focused on the sprite animations. The game flopped in arcades but became the best-selling Neo Geo AES title at the time. Retrospective commentary in the years following its release have been mixed. A sequel for the Neo Geo Pocket was announced but never released.

== Gameplay ==
Magician Lord is a side-scrolling action game. The story unfolds in the land of Cadacis, which was once on the brink of destruction by the appearance of a demon named Gal Agiese. He led a horde of monsters and sought to resurrect Az Atorse, the god of destruction. A young man, using all the magic at his disposal, destroyed the monsters and sealed Gal Agiese and Az Atorse inside eight grimoires. The people cheered the young man and hailed him as the "Magician Lord". Several centuries of peace passed until Gal Agiese revived and broke the seal, leading an attack on Cadacis and attempting to resurrect Az Atorse by opening the grimoires that had vanished one day. Elta, a descendant of the Magician Lord, embarks on a journey to find the grimoires and seal Gal Agiese away before he can resurrect Az Atorse. (Note: Attributed to multiple references:)

Elta in his normal form battling against the cyclopean firebreather Itaqua, the first stage boss in Magician Lord

The player controls Elta and fights enemies across eight stages. Elta can jump, climb ladders, crouch, and attack with magic shots in four directions. Each stage consists of a main area with doors leading to a trap-filled dungeon. The primary goal is to find the door that leads to the room where a miniboss is located. Defeating the miniboss leads to a battle against the main stage boss, and the player will obtain a grimoire upon defeating it. In each stage, there are scattered treasure chests containing items such as an extra life, valuables that award points, a power-up (P) orb that increases Elta's attack power by up to three levels, and elemental orbs.

There are three types of elemental orbs: fire (red), water (blue), and wind (green). By collecting two of them, and depending on the combination, Elta can transform into one of six different beings, including a dragon warrior, a waterman, a poseidon, a shinobi, a samurai, and a raijin. Each one possesses specific powers: the dragon warrior can breathe fire and aim diagonally at short range; the waterman can toss water balls that shoot out upon contact with the ground; the poseidon can send bursts of frozen water that transform into waves spreading across the ground; the shinobi can unleash spiraling magic bursts; the samurai can slash out medium-range wave projectiles from its magic sword; and the raijin can emit a barrage of thunder at short range. Each transformation also changes the player's attributes: the dragon warrior, waterman, and poseidon move slowly, while the shinobi, samurai, and raijin can jump high.

Elta's health bar starts with two hit points (three in the home version) and increases to four (six in the home version) upon transformation. Elta will revert to his normal form if his health bar returns to its initial hit points. Elta's attack power will also decrease by one level when hit by enemies, but collecting an elemental orb will restore his health bar. The player will lose a life once the health bar is depleted and will respawn at the place where they died, while in the home version they will respawn at a checkpoint. The game is over once all lives are lost, but the player can continue from where they died, while in the home version they return to the beginning of the stage. The player can save and resume their progress by using a Neo Geo memory card. The game also allows two players to participate by alternating turns.

== Development ==
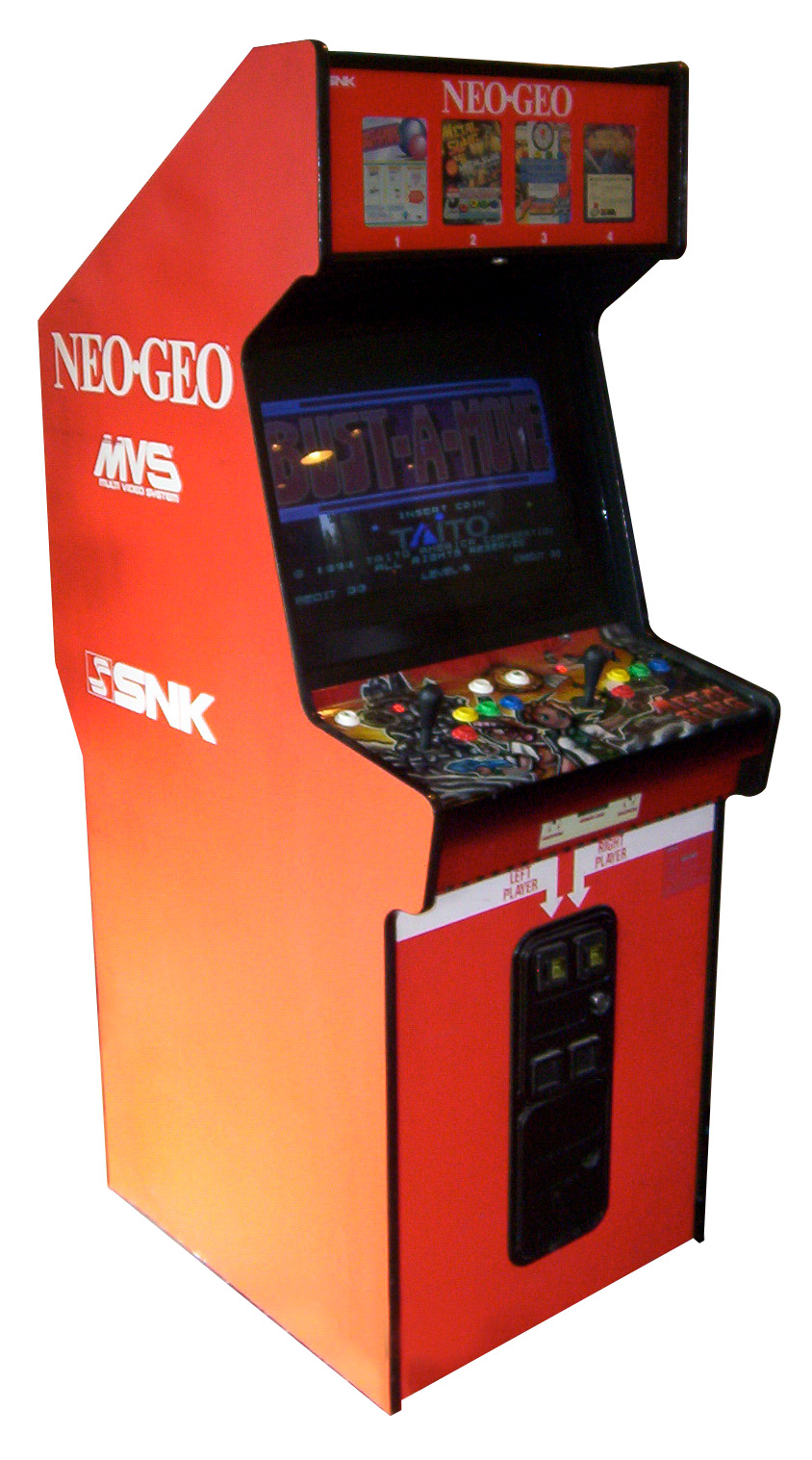
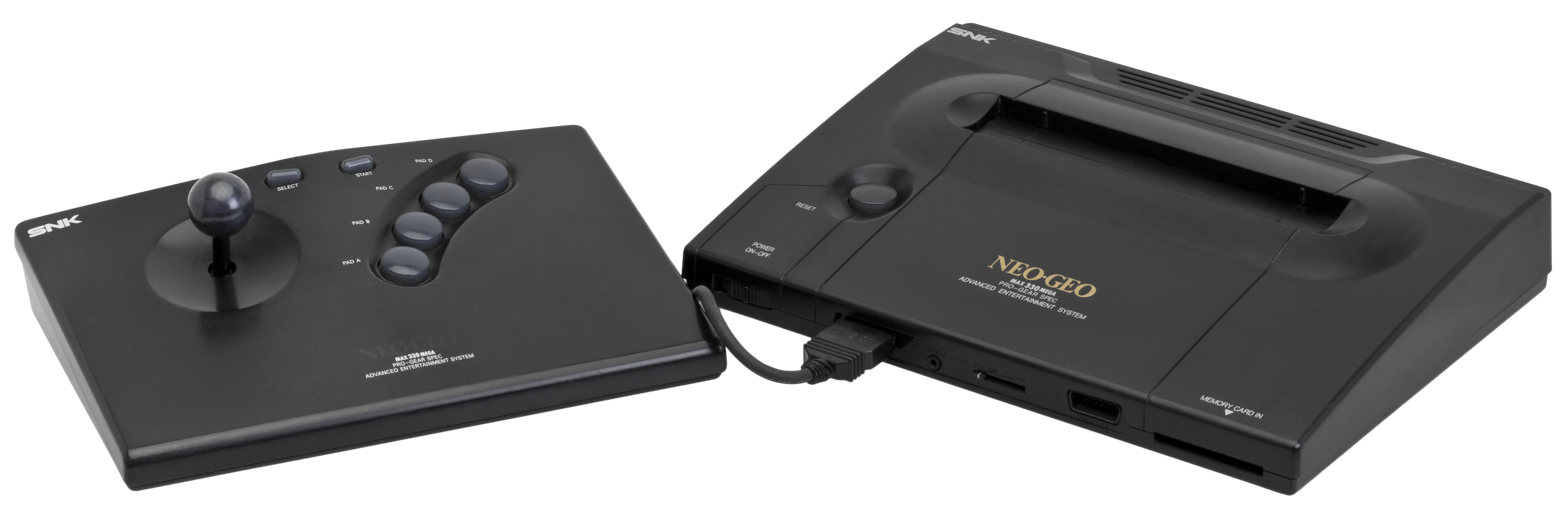
Magician Lord was the first game Alpha Denshi developed for the Neo Geo platform (MVS on the left; AES on the right).

Magician Lord was the first Neo Geo game developed by Alpha Denshi, an Ageo-based video game developer founded in 1980. Alpha Denshi had established a close relationship with SNK and collaborated on the hardware design of what would eventually become the Neo Geo. The game was produced by Akira Ushizawa, head of Alpha Denshi's second planning division, who had previously worked on titles such as Time Soldiers (1987), Sky Soldiers (1988), and Sky Adventure (1989). Ushizawa also worked as a graphic designer for the game's character sprites, along with Shinji Moriyama, head of planning and design at Alpha Denshi. Yukinori Nishikata, head of the programming section at Alpha Denshi, served as one of the game's programmers.

The team originally designed Magician Lord with the intention of releasing it on home consoles, but they faced numerous challenges due to it being their first foray into Neo Geo development and the production environment at the time. According to Ushizawa, the game was easier during the initial location test, but the team felt that would be boring and increased the difficulty for the final release. The face of Gal Agiese, which appears after defeating the sub-boss of each stage, is based on Colonel Cloud, a character from Sky Adventure, although Ushizawa stated that the two characters were unrelated.

=== Music ===
The music for Magician Lord was scored by Hideki Yamamoto, Hiroaki Shimizu, and Yuka Watanabe. It was their first project using sampling, which thrilled them, as they felt it removed limitations and gave them a great deal of freedom. They worked with different musical genres: Yamamoto drew inspiration from R&B, Shimizu from heavy metal, and Watanabe from jazz fusion. Shimizu stated that while the different musical styles might give the impression of a fragmented structure, he considered it a positive that the result was not monotonous.

A CD album titled Neo Geo Sound Power -G.S.M. SNK 2- was distributed in Japan by Scitron and Pony Canyon on June 21, 1990, containing the original soundtracks of five Neo Geo titles including Magician Lord. In 2013, a four-CD album titled ADK Ontama was released under City Connection's Clarice Disk label, containing the game's soundtrack and other Neo Geo titles. In 2020, the game's soundtrack was also included as part of the fifteenth volume of the SNK Arcade Sound Digital Collection, an multi-volume series released under the Clarice Disk label. That same year, Wayô Records distributed the game's soundtrack on CD and vinyl albums, featuring a piano arrangement by Nicolas Horvath.

== Release ==
Magician Lord was first showcased at the 1990 AOU Show, and later at the 1990 American Coin Machine Exposition (ACME). The game was released for arcades by SNK first in Japan on April 26, 1990, and then in North America that same month, as one of the first four games for the Neo Geo Multi Video System (MVS). On July 1, 1991, SNK released the game for the Neo Geo Advanced Entertainment System (AES), the home version of the MVS, in Japan and North America, followed by the United Kingdom in February 1992. In North America, it was included as a pack-in game with the AES Gold System bundle. On October 31, 1994, ADK published the game for the Neo Geo CD, a CD-ROM-based home version of the Neo Geo. The Neo Geo CD version was also released in the United Kingdom by New Generation in November 1994, in Brazil by Neo Geo do Brasil on April 6, 1995, and in North America by SNK in October 1996.

=== Re-releases ===
In 2007, D4 Enterprise announced that it had received a license from SNK Playmore to distribute Neo Geo games on the Wii's Virtual Console, with Magician Lord being one of them. Its release on the Virtual Console took place first in Japan on September 18, 2007, then in Europe on October 26, 2007, and later in North America on October 29, 2007. In 2008, the game was included in the SNK Arcade Classics Vol. 1 compilation, released in North America by SNK Playmore and in Europe by Ignition Entertainment for the Wii, PlayStation 2, and PlayStation Portable (PSP). SNK Playmore later released the PSP version in Japan on May 21, 2009.

In 2010, SNK Playmore announced NEOGEO Station, a download service within the PlayStation Store that offered Neo Geo games for PSP and PlayStation 3, with Magician Lord as one of the first ten titles. Its release on NEOGEO Station took place first in North America on December 21, 2010, and later in Europe and Japan on December 22, 2010. In 2012, the game was included as one of the twenty pre-installed titles on the Neo Geo X. In 2017, Hamster Corporation released the game as part of the ACA Neo Geo series for the Nintendo Switch, PlayStation 4, and Xbox One, followed by a Microsoft Windows version in 2018. In 2018, the game was included as one of the built-in titles on the international and christmas editions of the Neo Geo Mini. In 2019, it was also included as one of the pre-installed titles on the "Samurai Shodown" and "Samurai Spirits Kuroko" editions of the Neo Geo Mini.

In 2020, Magician Lord was included as one of the fifty built-in titles on the Neo Geo MVSX arcade tabletop system. In 2022, SNK released iOS and Android versions of the ACA Neo Geo edition of the game. In 2025, the game was included in the Neo Geo Arcade 1 collection released by Blaze Entertainment for the Evercade. That same year, the ACA Neo Geo edition of the game was included as part of the ACA Neo Geo Selection Vol. 9 collection for the Nintendo Switch. The AES version is planned to be re-released as one of the launch titles for the Neo Geo AES+, a recreation of the original AES hardware announced in 2026.

== Reception ==
Reception

Review scores
Publication	Score
AllGame	3/5
Consoles +	93%
Computer and Video Games	75%
Electronic Gaming Monthly	9/10, 8/10, 9/10, 8/10
GameFan	99%, 91%, 92%, 95%
HobbyConsolas	95/100
Joystick	96%
Mega Fun	85%
Player One	93%
The Games Machine (UK)	88%
Amstar Informatique	17/20
Consolemania	86/100
Megablast	73%

In North America, Magician Lord was ranked forty-first among arcade games in a September 1990 equipment survey by Play Meter, while RePlay listed it in its November 1990 issue as being the tenth most-popular arcade game of the previous month. According to Chad Okada, a former SNK staffer, the game was a flop in arcades, but became the best-selling Neo Geo AES title at the time. Japanese publication Micom BASIC Magazine ranked the Neo Geo CD version seventh in popularity in its November 1994 issue. The game also received a generally favorable reception from critics.

Joystick lauded the game's soundscapes and the magician's various transformations, but criticized the lack of fluidity in the character animation. José Luis Sanz and Marcos García of HobbyConsolas praised the game's beautiful graphics, soundtrack, gameplay, and bosses. GameFan regarded Magician Lord to be one of the best action-platform games ever made, if not the best. They applauded its cutting-edge graphics, exceptional music, challenging gameplay, and level design. Consoles + highlighted the game's astounding visuals, soundscapes, and demanding gameplay, but noted that the presence of a continue option was its weak point. Olivier Scamps of Player One complimented the game's polished graphics, excellent music, and precise controls, but pointed out its high difficulty and criticized the main character's jerky animations.

The Games Machine's Robin Candy opined that each stage was visually impressive and that the magician's transformations were a good idea, but noted that the game can be very frustrating. Consolemania's Davide Corrado praised the game's audiovisual presentation and playability, but pointed out its extreme difficulty. Amstar Informatique stated that Magician Lord was "a work of art", citing its detailed backgrounds and compelling music. Electronic Gaming Monthly's four editors considered it an excellent game, praising its sophisticated graphics, addictive gameplay, and bosses. Philipp Noak and Stefan Hellert of Mega Fun complimented the game for its great visuals and top-notch soundtrack, but noted its steep difficulty. Video Games's Andreas Knauf recommended the game, but felt that its gameplay paled in comparison to its audiovisual department.

In their fourth "Complete Guide To Consoles", Computer and Video Games deemed the game challenging and addictive. Richard Löwenstein of Megablast commended Magician Lord for its visual presentation and catchy music. Löwenstein felt the magician's diverse transformations added strategic depth, but noted the lack of enemy variety and issues with the controls. AllGame's Kyle Knight gave positive feedback on the solid gameplay and creative stages. Knight stated that the transformation mechanic, while interesting, could have been great if implemented properly. However, he felt that the choppy sprite animations and poor voice acting were the game's main flaws.

=== Retrospective coverage ===
Retrospective commentary for Magician Lord has been mixed. Damien McFerran and Chris Scullion of Nintendo Life praised the game's audiovisual presentation, as well as Elta's ability to transform into different characters and the enemy design. However, McFerran felt the game's sprites were clumsily animated and noted its harsh difficulty, while Scullion criticized the confusing level design. IGN's Lucas M. Thomas commended the game for its elaborate graphics and impressive soundtrack, as well as Elta's distinctive transformations, but felt the controls were stiff. Nintendo World Report's Jonathan Metts highlighted the impressive graphics and the ability to transform into other characters, but found the game poorly designed due to cheap shots dealt by enemies. GameSpot's Frank Provo gave positive remarks about the colorful visuals, well-composed music, and large bosses, but found the unresponsive controls and Elta's slow pace to be negative aspects of the game. Retro Gamer's Darran Jones stated that "Magician Lord is a classic example of an AES release that was reasonably well received back in the day but now looks and plays like the dinosaur that it is".

Hardcore Gamer found the game fun due to the ability to transform into other characters, but noted its overwhelming difficulty. Vandal's Emmanuel Castro opined that, due to its high difficulty, the game was not for everyone. Hardcore Gaming 101's Michael Plasket stated that "Regardless of how gruesomely punishing it is, Magician Lord is regardless worth checking out for any SNK die-hards and action game fans".

In 2006, Electronic Gaming Monthly ranked Magician Lord at number 179 in its list of the "Greatest 200 Video Games of Their Time". In 2014, HobbyConsolas identified it as one of the twenty best games for the Neo Geo AES. In 2023, Time Extension also listed it as one of the best Neo Geo games.

== Legacy ==
Magician Lord marked Alpha Denshi's first foray into the Neo Geo platform. In 1993, Alpha Denshi changed its name to ADK and became a third-party developer closely associated to SNK. ADK was the most active third-party developer for the Neo Geo, with over 17 games developed up to 1998. These include Ninja Combat, Blue's Journey, Crossed Swords, Thrash Rally, Ninja Commando, World Heroes, Aggressors of Dark Kombat, Master of Syougi, Over Top, Ninja Master's: Haō Ninpō Chō, and Twinkle Star Sprites. Magician Lord is also part of a trilogy set in the land of Cadasis, consisting of Crossed Swords and its sequel, Crossed Swords II, for the Neo Geo CD.

In the years since, fans have experimented with unofficial ports of Magician Lord to other platforms. In 2019, Brazilian developer Paulo "Master Linkuei" Ferreira created a demo of the game for the Sega Genesis/Mega Drive. In 2023, Brazilian developer Maxwel Olinda released a demo of the game for the Super Nintendo Entertainment System online. In 2024, French developer "Kaminarinom" released a demo of the game for the PC Engine SuperGrafx online.

=== Unreleased follow-up ===
In 1993, Electronic Gaming Monthly reported that a sequel to Magician Lord was in development. In 1995, GameFan reported that the sequel had been nearly finished for over a year, but ADK had postponed it to focus more on fighting games. In 2000, the sequel was announced for the Neo Geo Pocket under the title Magician Lord, with a planned release in Japan and North America. The game never materialized, however, due to ADK's bankruptcy. According to Chad Okada, SNK had no real plans to release a sequel due to the failure of Magician Lord in arcades.

In 2012, a sample cartridge of Magician Lord for the Neo Geo Pocket was acquired and showcased by Gamekult. The premise of the game would take place three years after the defeat of Gal Agiese, a period during which humanity has disrupted the world's balance, creating a breach in the seal of the eight grimoires that would lead to his resurrection. Gal Agiese sinks the castle of Cadasis, which housed the tomes, into the depths of the Earth, but not before the queen uses her last strength to propel the final tome towards Elta. The game was to be similar to a Metroidvania and would offer more transformations for Elta, including a horned demon, an axe-wielding warrior, a mummy, a troll, an angel, a werewolf, and a golem.
