= List of cancelled games for SNK consoles =

SNK is a Japanese video game developer and publisher. Between 1990 and 1999, the company developed several home and handheld video game consoles, including the Neo Geo MVS and AES, the Neo Geo CD, and the Neo Geo Pocket Color. The company ceased manufacturing consoles in 2001 due to bankruptcy, which also led to the cancellation of several games intended for release on these systems. This list documents games that were announced for one of SNK's systems at some point, but did not end up being released for them in any capacity.

== Games ==
There are currently 28 games on this list. (Note: This number is always up to date by this script.)

List of cancelled games for SNK platforms
Title(s)	Notes/Reasons	Developer	Publisher
All-Star Volley	A sports video game by Magical Company planned for Neo Geo CD.	Magical Company	Magical Company
Bang Bang Busters	An action game by Visco Corporation for Neo Geo. Visco presented the game at the AOU Show between 1993 and 1994. Its launch was planned between 1999 and 2000, but it never materialized. Years later, a company called Neo Conception International (NCI) managed to obtain the rights to publish the game after reaching a licensing agreement with Visco. Between 2010 and 2011, NCI released a limited run of 100 copies for the AES. Subsequently, NCI released versions for the MVS and Neo Geo CD.	Visco Corporation	—N/a
Block Paradise / Sun Shine	A puzzle game by Alpha Denshi planned for arcades (MVS) and consoles (AES). SNK announced and presented the game at the 1990 AM Show/JAMMA Show. Sun Shine was tested at a game center in Tokyo, but it did not perform well, which led to the game being redesigned and turned into Block Paradise. Block Paradise inherited the gameplay mechanics from Sun Shine and production continued until March 1991, when Alpha Denshi decided to redesign and turn the game into Fun Fun Bros. Sun Shine would be exhibited for the last time at the 1991 Winter CES. In 2022, a prototype cartridge of Block Paraside was sold at Yahoo! Auctions.	Alpha Denshi	SNK
Dance RhythMIX	A rhythm game by ADK for Neo Geo. The game was tested at a game center in Japan around 2003.	ADK	—N/a
Dragon's Heaven / DarkSeed	A fighting game by Face for Neo Geo. The project was in development at Technōs Japan before the company went bankrupt in 1996, and several staffers took it with them when joining Face. The game was initially titled DarkSeed before being renamed Dragon's Heaven. It was being produced by Kengo Asai, who worked on Voltage Fighter Gowcaizer, with Takumi Matsumae and his studio Toy Pops as subcontractor for the graphics. Development was cancelled due to funding issues. In 2016, Brian "NeoTurfMasta" Hargrove, a user of the Neo-Geo.com forum, acquired a Neo Geo development board containing a prototype of the game at Yahoo! Auctions. It was showcased at the 2016 Midwest Gaming Classic (MGC), and Hargrove subsequently leaked the ROM image online.	Face	—N/a
Droppers: Fuyushima no Daibōken	An action game by Video System for Neo Geo. Video System presented the game at the 1996 AOU Show, The game was last exhibited at the 1996 ACME before it went unreleased.	Video System	Video System
Dunk Star	A basketball game for Neo Geo. It was being developed by Aicom, a subsidiary of Sammy, and C-Lab. SNK announced and presented the game at the 1991 AOU Show and the 1991 Summer CES. Dunk Star was last exhibited at the 1991 AM Show before it went unreleased.	Aicom, C-Lab	Sammy
The Eye of Typhoon	A follow-up to Fight Fever, which Viccom had previously developed for Neo Geo. The game was first tested at Japanese game centers in October 1995, followed by location tests at Neo Geo Land in Sindang-dong and Songpa-dong in November 1995. It was first scheduled for release in December 1995, but was delayed to January 1996. However, the Neo Geo version was abruptly cancelled and never released. Instead, Viccom ported The Eye of Typhoon to 3DO and MS-DOS, published by LG only in South Korea.	Viccom	—N/a
Fun Fun Bros / Fun Fun Brothers	A puzzle game by Alpha Denshi for Neo Geo. It is the third and final iteration of Sun Shine, featuring a complete overhaul of the game engine and a theme based on the 1980 film, The Blues Brothers. Despite the overhaul, Fun Fun Bros would ultimately be cancelled. Video footage of the game appeared on Neo Geo Collectors Tape, a VHS sent to subscribers of the Neo Geo DHP Mailing List. In 1998, a prototype cartridge of Fun Fun Bros was sold privately on eBay to collector Larry Bassin.	Alpha Denshi	—N/a
Garou: Mark of the Wolves 2	During the KOF Year-End Party 2005 fan event, artist Falcoon mentioned that a sequel to Garou: Mark of the Wolves for Neo Geo was around 70% complete. Planner Yasuyuki Oda remained at SNK until production of the sequel was well underway, before moving to Dimps. According to designers Naoto Abe and Nobuyuki Kuroki, the scenario for the sequel was fully written and work on the characters, including new ones, was finished. However, the original SNK dissolved in 2001 during development, leaving the project unfinished and shelved. Between 2016 and 2020, SNK unveiled production artwork and sprites of the characters from the cancelled sequel. In 2022, two CDs belonging to a former SNK developer were discovered containing material for the cancelled sequel. A sequel to Mark of the Wolves would not be released until Fatal Fury: City of the Wolves (2025).	SNK	SNK
Ghostlop	A puzzle game by Data East for Neo Geo. Tony Taka was responsible for the game's character design. SNK presented the game at the 1996 AM Show and the 1996 AMOA. Ghostlop was last exhibited at the 1997 AOU Show, as it was never released due to not performing well during testing and the bankruptcy of Data East. In 2003, collector Billy Pitt acquired and sold a prototype of the game to a French group, which produced a limited run of copies for sale to European collectors, but later a ROM image was leaked online by Neo-Geo.com users "TonK" and Jeff "JMKurtz" Kurtz. In 2004, G-Mode acquired the back catalogue of Data East titles, including Ghostlop.	Data East	SNK
GX-037	A shoot 'em up game by Toaplan for Neo Geo. It was one of four shoot 'em up game projects proposed by the planners at Toaplan.	Toaplan	—N/a
Hebereke no Pair Pair Wars	A puzzle game from Sunsoft's Hebereke series for Neo Geo. Sunsoft showcased the game at the 1996 AOU Show, but it was later cancelled for unknown reasons. In 1998, a prototype of the game, owned by a North American arcade operator, was reportedly damaged in a flood. In 2023, the game's soundtrack was released as a pre-order bonus along with Sunsoft Chronicle, a book documenting Sunsoft's history, when ordered from Shosen bookstores.	Sunsoft	—N/a
Karate Ninja Shō	A Final Fight-style game, intended to be Yumekobo's first title for Neo Geo. Karate Ninja Shō was tested in locations in Shibuya and Ikebukuro, generating high income. Six months later, SNK ordered another test to be carried out in Kansai in preparation for the game's release. According to the game's director, known only by the pseudonym "Kanayama 68000", a development chief at the time felt threatened by the game, as a PlayStation title led by his team did not sell well, and conspired to have it cancelled in order to protect his position. Kanayama claimed that the chief deliberately planned for the second test to be held in a small game center during a holiday, causing the game to not generate much income and be cancelled. After the cancellation of Karate Ninja Shō, the chief ordered that the game's ROM be deleted, but one of Kanayama's team members lied to the chief and hid it. Akio Inoue, who commissioned the project, learned of the chief's orders and was fired. In 2022, Kanayama showed the project proposal document online and stated that one of the staff members kept the game, but he was unaware of what happened to it afterward.	Yumekobo	—N/a
Last Odyssey: Pinball Fantasia	A pinball game planned for Neo Geo CD. It was being developed by Monolith, which had previously developed the Neo Geo titles Mina-san no Okage-sama Desu! Dai Sugoroku Taikai and Bakatono-sama Mahjong Man'yuki.	Monolith	—N/a
Magician Lord sequel	In 1993, Electronic Gaming Monthly reported that a sequel to Magician Lord (1990) was in development. In 1995, GameFan reported that the sequel had been nearly finished for over a year, but ADK had postponed it to focus more on fighting games. In 2000, the sequel was announced for the Neo Geo Pocket under the title Magician Lord, with a planned release in Japan and North America. However, the game never materialized due to ADK's bankruptcy. In 2012, a sample cartridge of Magician Lord for the Neo Geo Pocket was acquired and showcased by Gamekult.	ADK	SNK
Mahō Juku: Magic Master	A puzzle game by Saurus and Takumi Corporation planned for arcades (MVS). Saurus presented the game at the 1997 AOU Show.	Saurus, Takumi Corporation	Saurus
Maseki Taisen Stone	A puzzle game by I'MAX planned for arcades (MVS). It was intended to be I'MAX's first title for Neo Geo and arcades. I'MAX presented the game at the AM Show between 1994 and 1995.	I'MAX	I'MAX
Mystic Wand	An action game by Alpha Denshi for Neo Geo. Kenji Sawatari, who later conceived World Heroes, acted as the game planner, with Gen Suzuki as the designer. SNK unveiled the game at the 1991 Summer CES, with plans for its release in November 1991. Mystic Wand was tested at a game center in Okegawa, performing well on the first day but income dropped drastically afterward, causing it to fail the location test and be cancelled, despite being finished and delivered to SNK. According to Takashi Hatono, a former Alpha Denshi staffer, Suzuki stole the Neo Geo development board that contained the game after being fired from the company.	Alpha Denshi	SNK
Ninja Gaiden II / Ninja Ryūkenden II	A beat 'em up game by Tecmo for Neo Geo and an arcade sequel to Ninja Gaiden (1988). The game featured three selectable characters: Ryu Hayabusa, Rash (an American football player), and Ran (a schoolgirl idol). Takuya Hanaoka, who composed music for the Super Nintendo Entertainment System version of Tecmo Super Bowl, scored six music tracks for Ninja Gaiden II. The game was tested at a game center in Tokyo in July 1994, but was cancelled due to negative feedback regarding its difficulty. Following the cancellation of Ninja Gaiden II, three different teams were formed to create new projects using leftover assets from it, and one of them opted for a ninja-themed game, which eventually became Tōkidenshō Angel Eyes.	Tecmo	Tecmo
Puzzlekko Club	A puzzle game by Visco Corporation planned for arcades (MVS). Visco presented the game at the 1994 AM Show and it was last exhibited at the 1997 AOU Show.	Visco Corporation	Visco Corporation
QP / Quality People	A party game planned for arcades (MVS) and Neo Geo CD. It was intended to be Success's first title for Neo Geo. Shinobu Itō served as the game's lead designer. Players would control Tomo (1P) and Megu (2P) through six stages on a board made up of squares, advancing one square at a time to reach a boss. There were three types of squares, each corresponding to a minigame: A (action), P (puzzle), and B (bonus). The specific minigame would be selected via roulette. QP was first scheduled for release in January 1996, but was delayed to May 1997. The game, which was roughly 85% complete, was delayed a final time until fall 1997, but it never materialized.	Success	—N/a
Samurai Shodown V Perfect / Samurai Spirits Zero Perfect	An updated version of Samurai Shodown V Special by Yuki Enterprise and the last game officially developed for Neo Geo, Samurai Shodown V Perfect introduced gameplay fixes, as well as new stories and endings for the characters. It was tested at a game center, but SNK, unaware of the project, found out and abruptly canceled the test. Kouji Takaya, an employee of Yuki Enterprise, preserved a ROM image of the final game, which was included as part of the Samurai Shodown Neo Geo Collection.	Yuki Enterprise	—N/a
Shōgi Musume: Nanairo to Iki	A shogi game by I'MAX planned for arcades (MVS), intended to be their second Neo Geo title. I'MAX presented the game at the 1995 AM Show, and it would be exhibited for the last time at the 1996 AOU Show.	I'MAX	I'MAX
Supapoon	A block breaker game, originally published by Yutaka for Super Famicom (SFC). The Neo Geo version was going to be released by Magical Company. According to Masaru Moriya, character designer for the SFC version, the Neo Geo version was never released due to poor reception during a location test.	—N/a	Magical Company
Treasure of the Caribbean / Karibu no Zaihō	A puzzle game by Face for Neo Geo planned for arcades (MVS). It was going to feature three selectable characters, each with their own attributes, and three game modes: CPU Battle, Time Attack, and Versus. Face presented the game on the 1994 AM Show, but it never made it to market. Years later, NCI acquired an incomplete build of the game, but the data was reportedly too corrupted to be used, leading to a reconstruction by Le Cortex, a French homebrew developer. In 2012, NCI released Treasure of the Caribbean for Neo Geo CD, followed by versions for AES and MVS.	Face	—N/a
Ultimate 4 / King of Athletes	An action game by Face planned for Neo Geo CD. Players would control one of four characters and participate in 16 minigames. It was scheduled for release in August 1995 under the name King of Athletes. The game was later renamed Ultimate 4, but a final release date was never confirmed.	Face	—N/a
The Warlocks of the Fates / Shinryū Senki	A fighting game by Astec21 for Neo Geo. The game would feature eight selectable characters, six selectable elemental gems, and two game modes: "The Record of the Divine Dragons War" and "The Tournament of Dragon Gem Crafts". In "The Record of the Divine Dragons War", the player selected their route through Wonderland and faced an opponent, while in "The Tournament of Dragon Gem Crafts" the player had to win against eight opponents. Joe Rinoie composed the game's soundtrack. A release date was never confirmed and the game ultimately never materialized. In 2012, a former Astec21 staffer donated a prototype of The Warlocks of the Fates to a Mandarake store. That same year, NCI acquired the rights to the game.	Astec21	—N/a
