= Dunk Star =

- Japanese arcade flyer
- Developer: Sammy
- Publisher: Sammy
- Platforms: Arcade, Neo Geo AES
- Release: Unreleased
- Genre: Sports
- Modes: Single-player, multiplayer
- Arcade system: Neo Geo MVS

Dunk Star (Note: Japanese: ダンクスター, Hepburn: Danku Sutā) is an unreleased 1991 basketball arcade video game that was in development and planned to be published by Sammy for the arcade Neo Geo MVS and Neo Geo AES home console. Had it been launched before Street Slam, it would have become the first basketball title for the Neo Geo platforms.

Featuring arcade-style gameplay, players compete with either AI-controlled opponents or against other players in versus matches on the game. Although previewed across a few video game magazines, in addition to being showcased to attendees at various trade shows, Dunk Star was ultimately shelved for unknown reasons.

== Gameplay ==
Screenshot from the revealed beta build

Dunk Star is a five-on-five street basketball game reminiscent of Ultimate Basketball, where players take control of any of the available teams to participate in a series of matches with either AI-controlled opponents or against other players. Though similar to other realistic basketball in terms of playability and controls, the game provides a faster pace. During gameplay, players can pass, jump, shoot and dunk to score points. Players can switch between both characters on their team when using an AI teammate. When performing a dunk, the game zooms in to provide a dramatic angle to the shot. A game over occurs once the timer runs out and the player with the highest score wins the match unless players insert more credits into the arcade machine to continue playing.

== Development ==
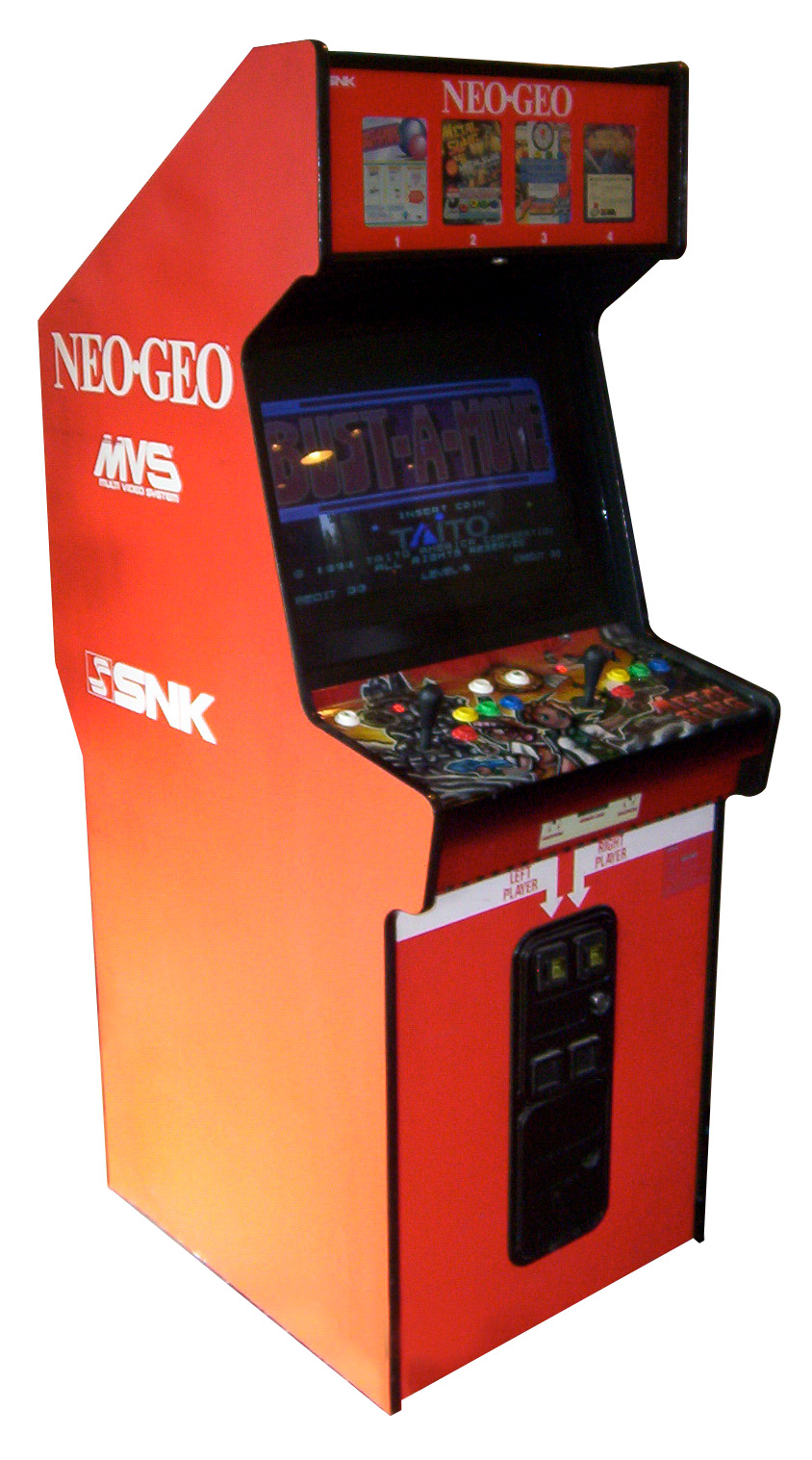
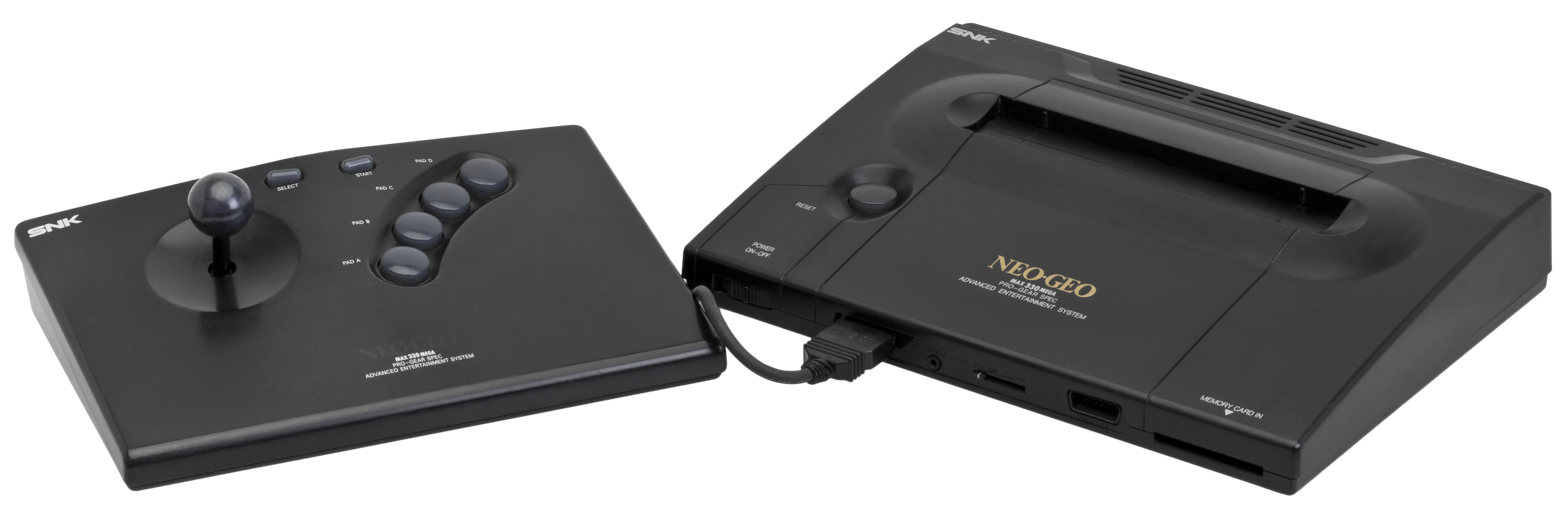
Dunk Star would have served as the first basketball title to be released for the Neo Geo platform.

Dunk Star was the first project to be developed by Sammy for the Neo Geo and would have been the first basketball release for the platforms. Although its production number during development remains unknown, it is generally believed to be assigned with the number 28. The game was first showcased publicly in a playable state to attendees of the Summer Consumer Electronics Show in June 1991 at SNK's booth alongside other then-upcoming titles for the Neo Geo such as Blue's Journey by Alpha Denshi and Legend of Success Joe by Wave Corporation, among others displayed at the showfloor. The title was also showcased at the AOU Show, Amusement & Music Operators Association Show (AMOA) and Amusement Machine Show events held on the same year respectively.

Despite Dunk Star being previewed in magazines such as Gamest and demoed across various trade shows, it was ultimately shelved for unknown reasons, but several possible factors have been given as to why the title was never released in recent years, though Sammy would later publish a game called Super Dunk Star for the Super Famicom on April 28, 1993, in Japan, sharing various similarities with the unreleased title. The only known gameplay footage of the project was featured on a 1996 VHS tape sent to subscribers of the Neo Geo DHP mailing list called Neo Geo Collector's Tape. In 2002, an official promotional flyer of the game that was printed for arcade distributors and operators in January 1991 was discovered. Between 2002 and 2005, emulated screenshots from a prototype cartridge also surfaced online, indicating that the ROM image of the game has been preserved but not made widely available to public.
