= Sun Shine =

Unreleased 1990 video game

- Japanese arcade flyer
- Developer: Alpha Denshi
- Publisher: SNK
- Platforms: Arcade, Neo Geo AES
- Release: Unreleased
- Genre: Puzzle
- Modes: Single-player, multiplayer
- Arcade system: Neo Geo MVS

Sun Shine (Note: Japanese: サンシャイン, Hepburn: San Shain; also known as Block Paradise (ブロック パラダイス, Burokku Paradaisu)) is an unreleased 1990 tile-matching puzzle arcade video game that was in development by Alpha Denshi and planned to be published by SNK for both the Neo Geo MVS (arcade) and Neo Geo AES (home) platforms. It is the first puzzle game to be developed for both systems and the smallest Neo Geo game in terms of memory data.

Taking place in Paradise Island where looming severe weather threatens to disrupt the climate of the tropical location, players assume command of a dish that contains the Sun's transferred power in order to repel the incoming storms and restore the island to normal. Its gameplay consists of tile-matching, with a main two-button configuration and featuring two playable modes. Sun Shine was first given a location test in July 1990 and despite being previewed across a few video game magazines, in addition to being showcased to attendees at various trade shows, it was ultimately shelved for unknown reasons.

Although Sun Shine was never officially released to the general public by SNK in its original state despite being completed, it was recalled and received a complete overhaul by Alpha Denshi that would eventually lead to the game becoming a new project titled Fun Fun Bros, featuring a new storyline and theme while retaining the same gameplay from its original counterpart.

== Gameplay ==
Gameplay screenshot from the revealed beta build.

Sun Shine is a puzzle game similar to Columns and Tetris where the main objective is to match three colored tiles of the same color that fall at the top of the playfield as a vertical pair by catching them with the Sun Dish players take control of, instead of the blocks themselves to form a solid vertical line without gaps, although their falling order can be arranged depending on the difficulty level or game mode selected.

A vertical line section in the middle of the playfield allows players to aim and shoot at the incoming blocks with the A button to drop them into the dish, stopping them for a brief time period and they can be rotated by shooting once again at the pair, while managing to match five blocks in a X form will result on a special bonus.

Pressing the B button activates a colored Squall (Sunshine) that will clear all blocks that match it from the playfield but only two Squalls are given to players per credit, although more can be obtained by achieving a "Lucky Bonus" through a flashing X block that appears on random occasions at the center of a X pattern and matching four tiles of the same color. Failing to catch any of the blocks into the dish rises the water at the bottom of the screen by one level, leaving less space to catch the blocks and if said blocks exceeds the amount of available space on the playfield, the game is over as a result unless players insert more credits into the arcade machine to continue playing. The game also offers a two-player mode where players compete for the highest score.

== History ==
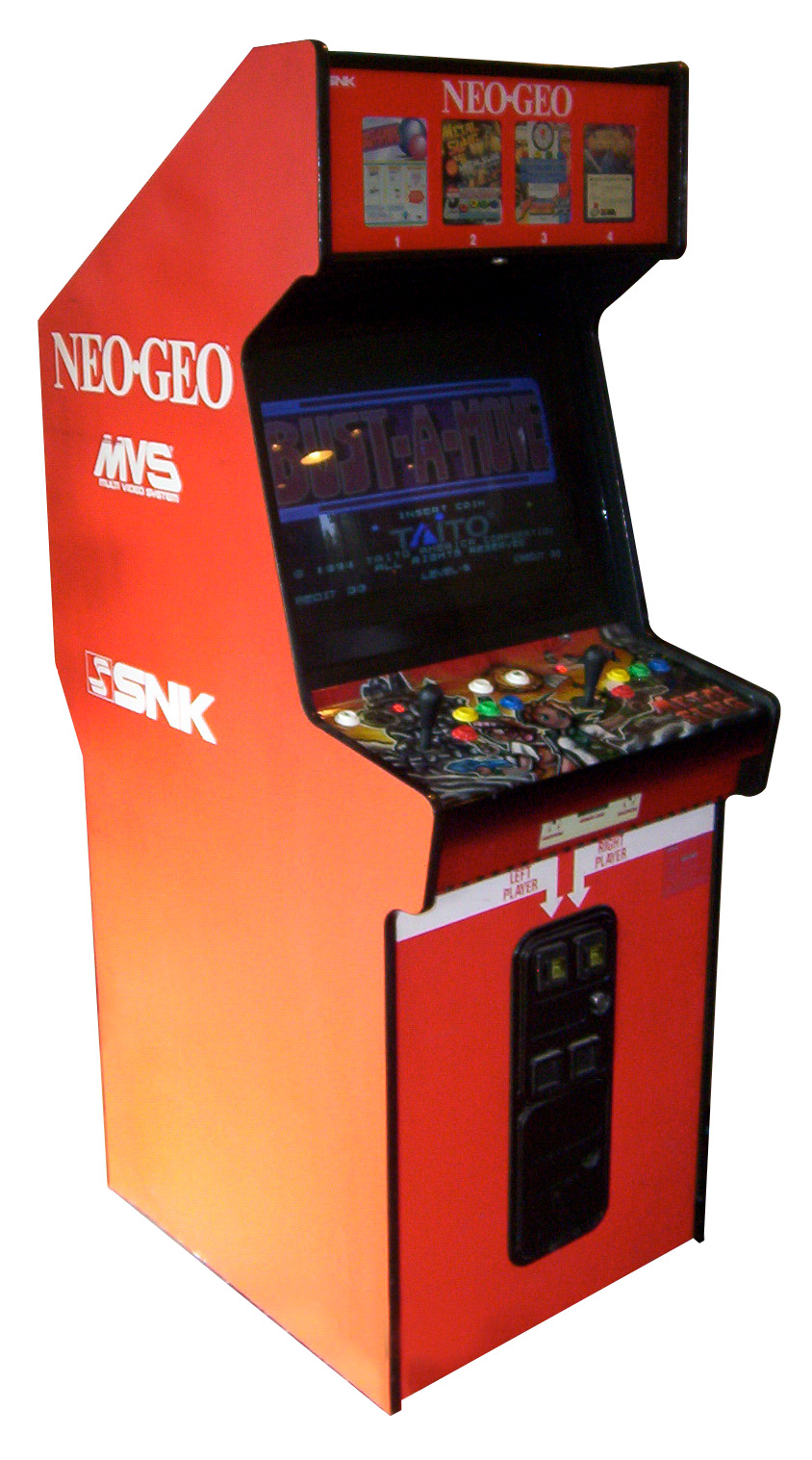
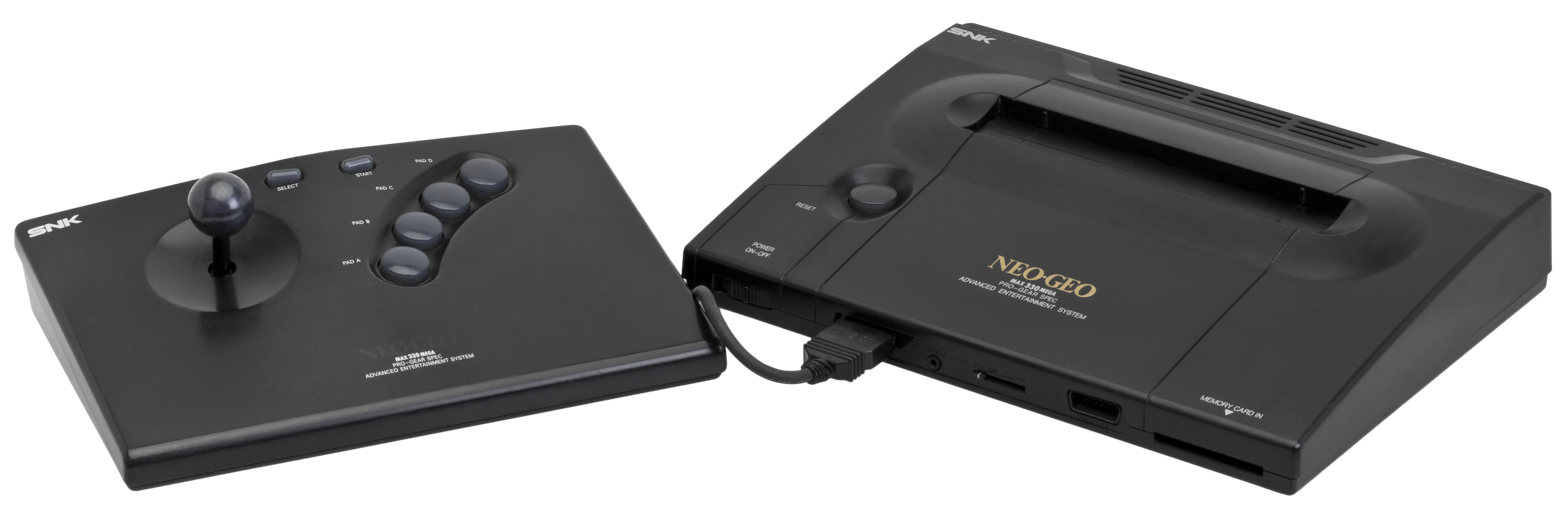
Despite being completed, Sun Shine was neither released for Neo Geo MVS (left) nor Neo Geo AES (right).

Sun Shine was one of the first twelve titles to be developed for the Neo Geo hardware alongside other projects by Alpha Denshi such as Magician Lord and Ninja Combat. The project was the first puzzle title created for Neo Geo and at only 18 megabits of data, it is also the smallest game developed for the platform compared with SNK's own Puzzled. Although its production number during development remains unknown, it is generally believed to be assigned with the number 8.

The game was first playable during a location test in Japan in July 1990 at Ikebukuru Sunshine Underground Gorilla, where it was met with a less than enthusiastic response from players. It was then showcased in a playable state to attendees at the 1990 Amusement Machine Show and later at the Winter Consumer Electronics Show in January 1991, in addition of being previewed on few magazines such as Electronic Gaming Monthly and Gamest, suggesting that the title was still planned for release. Despite being completed and ready for publication, it was ultimately shelved for unknown reasons, but several possible factors have been given as to why the title was never published in recent years.

In January 2003, an official promotional flyer of Sun Shine that was printed for arcade distributors and operators in October 1990 was discovered online at Yahoo! Auctions in Japan. In January 2005, emulated screenshots from a prototype cartridge of Block Paradise also surfaced online, indicating that the ROM image of the game has been preserved but not made widely available to public.

=== Fun Fun Bros ===
Screenshot of Fun Fun Bros

Although Sun Shine was not officially released by SNK in its original state despite being finished, it was recalled and underwent several changes by Alpha Denshi that would eventually lead it to become a new project titled Fun Fun Bros, featuring a new storyline and theme inspired by Universal Pictures' 1980 musical comedy film The Blues Brothers while gameplay remained the same during the overhaul in 1991, but this new version was also never released for unknown reasons.

Gameplay footage of this new version was featured on a 1996 VHS tape sent to subscribers of the Neo Geo DHP mailing list called Neo Geo Collector's Tape, while a working prototype cartridge was found and privately auctioned off on eBay in 1998 to video game collector Larry Bassin. To date, no ROM image of Fun Fun Bros has surfaced online.
