= Mystic Wand =

- Title screen
- Developer: Alpha Denshi
- Publisher: Alpha Denshi
- Platforms: Arcade, Neo Geo AES
- Release: Unreleased
- Genre: Puzzle-platform
- Modes: Single-player, multiplayer
- Arcade system: Neo Geo MVS

Mystic Wand (Japanese: ミスティックワンド, Hepburn: Misutikku Wando) is an unreleased 1991 puzzle-platform game that was in development and planned to be published by Alpha Denshi for both the Neo Geo MVS (arcade) and Neo Geo AES (home) platforms.

Taking place in a fantasy world, players assume the role of two magicians as they travel to multiple locations fighting against demonic enemies and ultimately scale to the top of a tower in order to face the Devil, who must be vanquished for good. Mystic Wand was previewed across a few video game magazines and trade shows to the public for testing, but was ultimately shelved for unknown reasons.

== Gameplay ==
Gameplay screenshot

Mystic Wand is a puzzle-platform game reminiscent of Solomon's Key, where players assume the role of two magicians on their journey through a fantasy world, fighting enemies along the way in order to reach a tower where Satan resides and ultimately defeat him as the main objective while facing challenging level designs, a countdown timer, instant death from any physical contact with enemies and limited ways to dispatch enemies, among other obstacles. Both player characters can run, jump, create or destroy blocks adjacent to them on any direction as well with the purpose of destroying demons or climb higher platforms. Along the way, players can also acquire items by opening treasure chests scattered on the playfield. Once the players loses all of their lives, the game is over as a result unless players insert more credits into the arcade machine to continue playing.

== History ==
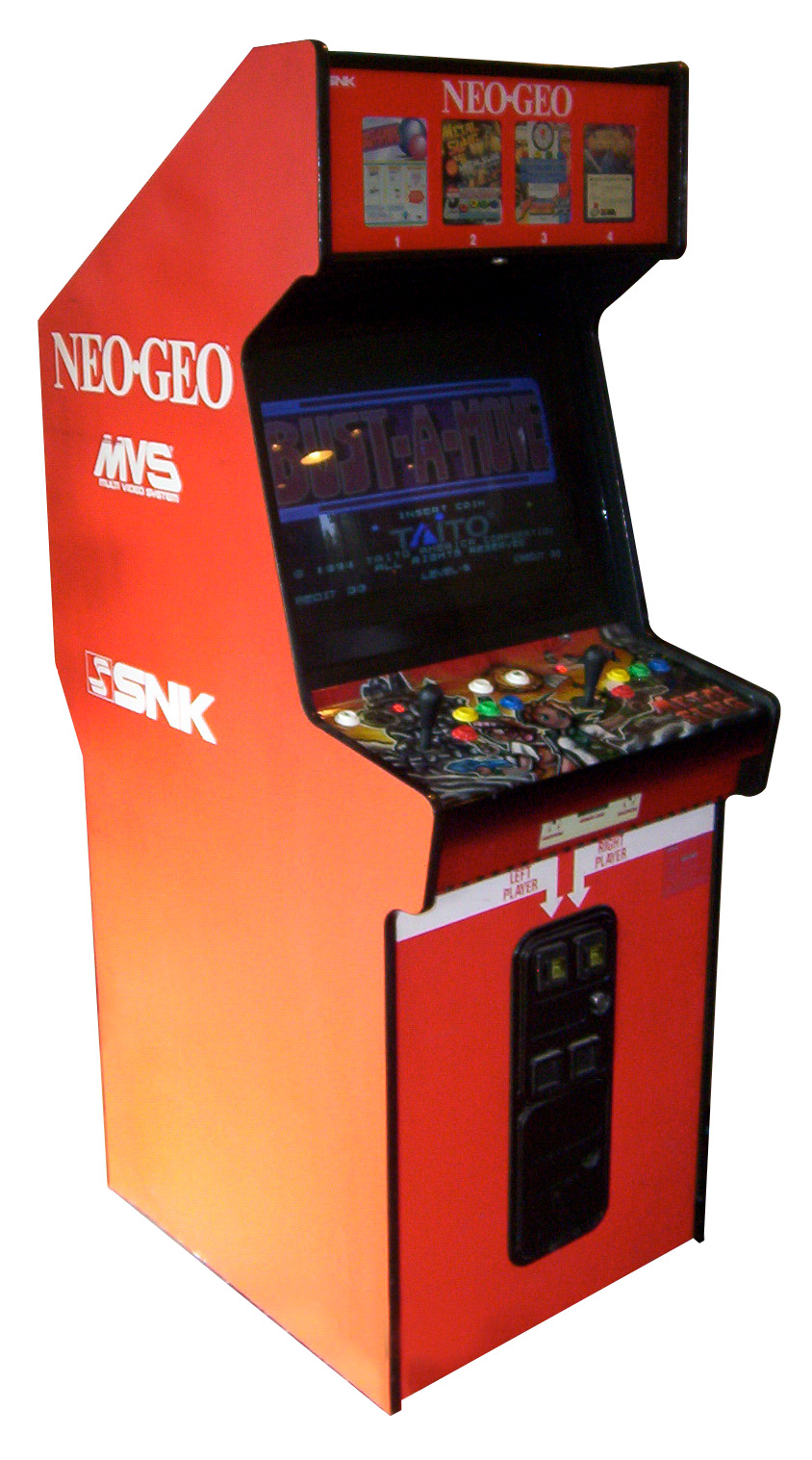
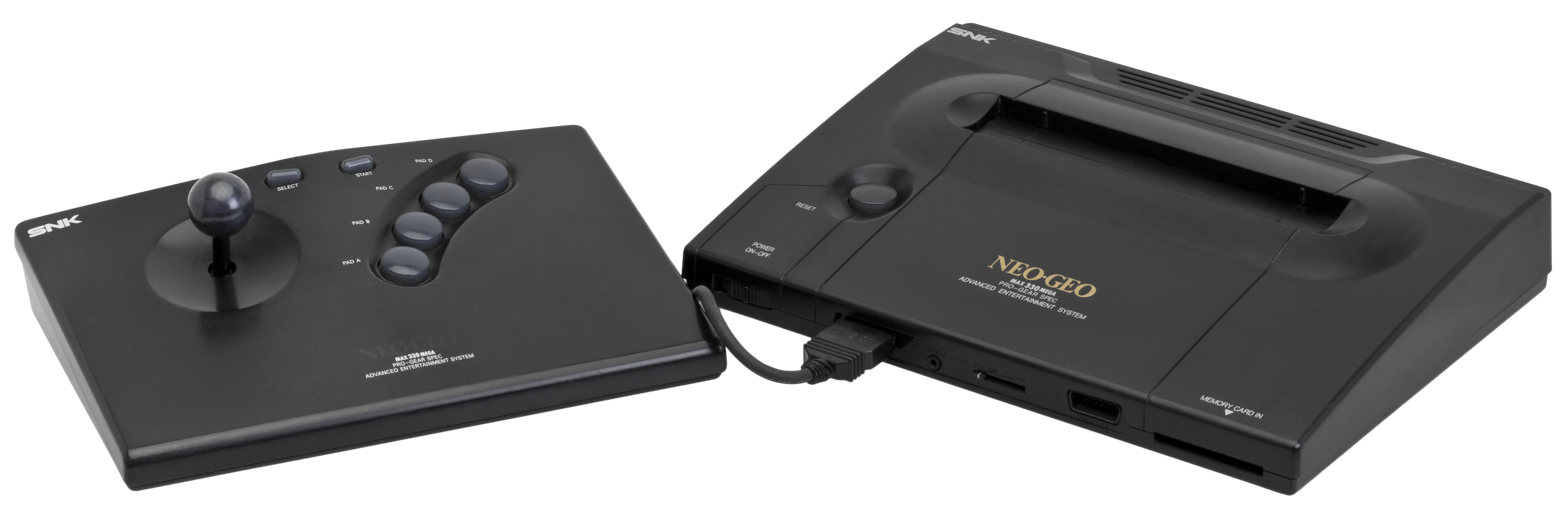
Despite being shown at trade shows, Mystic Wand was neither released for Neo Geo MVS (left) nor Neo Geo AES.

Mystic Wand was first shown in a playable state to attendees of the Summer Consumer Electronics Show in June 1991 at SNK's booth alongside other then-upcoming titles for the Neo Geo platform such as Blue's Journey and Legend of Success Joe by Wave Corporation, among others displayed at the showfloor. The game was also shown at the Amusement & Music Operators Association Show (AMOA) held on September during the same year as well. Though its production number during development remains unknown, it is generally believed to be assigned with the number 35, although there are conflicting reports online stating its assigned production number was 91.

Despite being previewed in magazines and shown at trade shows, the game was shelved for unknown reasons. Several possible factors have been given as to why the title was never released in recent years. The only known gameplay footage of the project was featured on a 1996 VHS tape sent to subscribers of the Neo Geo DHP mailing list called Neo Geo Collector's Tape. To date, no ROM image of Mystic Wand has surfaced online.
