= Neo Geo X =

Handheld game console

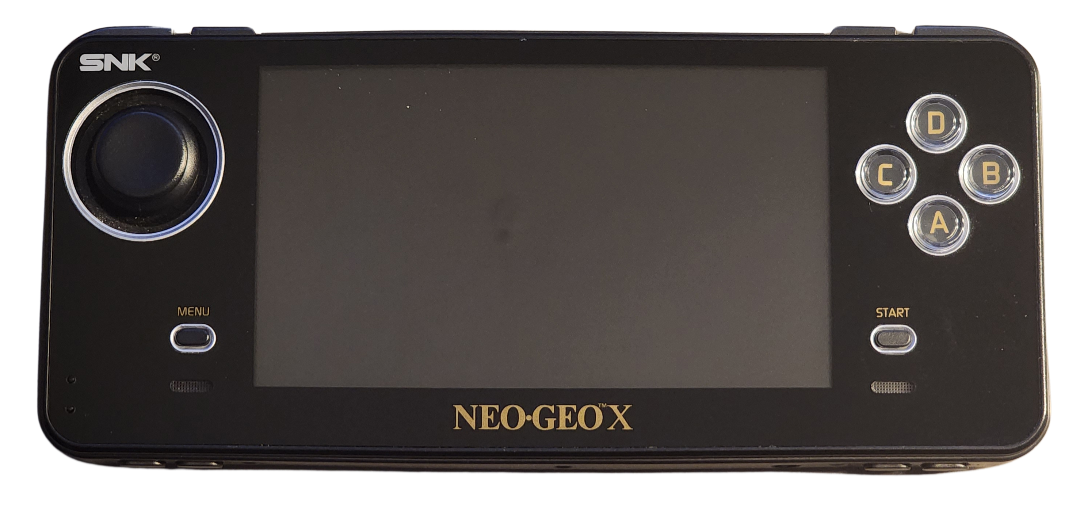
- A Neo Geo X console.
- Developer: SNK Playmore
- Manufacturer: Tommo; Blaze (Europe)
- Type: Hybrid video game console
- Generation: Eighth
- Released: December 18, 2012
- Introductory price: $199.99 USD
- Discontinued: c. 2014
- Media: SD card
- Operating system: OpenDingux
- System on a chip: Ingenic Semiconductor Jz4770
- CPU: XBurst (MIPS) @ 1GHz
- Memory: 128MB (DDR2 RAM)
- Storage: SanDisk 2GB Micro SD internal flash memory
- Display: 4.3" LCD 480 × 272 16:9 or 4:3 mode
- Graphics: Vivante GC860 444 MHz
- Predecessor: Neo Geo Pocket Color
- Website: www.neogeox.com

The Neo Geo X (NGX) is a hybrid video game console manufactured by Tommo, licensed by SNK Playmore and released on December 18, 2012. It features games that were popular on the original Neo Geo hardware and comes built-in with 20 original Neo Geo games, with additional titles available on game cards.

It was released as part of a bundle called the "Neo Geo X Gold Limited Edition", which included a docking station, an arcade stick, and a bonus game card. The docking station is modeled after the original Neo Geo AES console and is used for charging the handheld as well as connecting it to a television. The arcade stick is a replica of the original Neo Geo AES arcade stick that can be used as a controller when the handheld is connected to a TV through the docking station.

== Development and release ==
Information about the Neo Geo X was first reported in January 2012 and later confirmed in March. It was the first new hardware product bearing the Neo Geo name in over a decade following the Neo Geo Pocket Color, which was supported until 2001.

Initially, the device was rumored to retail for about $700+, but the price of the Neo Geo X Gold package was revealed to be $199, far less than the original Neo Geo AES console. The package was released in December 2012. A Ninja Master's game card was offered as a bonus with the package.

The handheld by itself, without the docking station and arcade stick, was later priced at $129.99 to come out in February 2013. However, links on the official website to the stand-alone handheld were subsequently removed and the FAQ stated that the docking station is required in order to charge the device.

In January 2013, SNK Playmore announced that manufacturing of the Gold Limited Edition package was ending with the last units arriving to retailers in April. However, they stated that the handheld would continue to be manufactured and that additional games and accessories would continue to be released.

The system was distributed by Tommo in North America and Blaze in Europe.

== Games ==
There were a total of 36 games for the Neo Geo X.

Twenty games came pre-loaded on the system including titles from signature SNK series such as Metal Slug, Fatal Fury and The King of Fighters:

- 3 Count Bout
- Alpha Mission II
- Art of Fighting
- Baseball Stars 2
- Cyber-Lip
- Fatal Fury
- Fatal Fury Special
- The King of Fighters '95
- King of the Monsters
- Last Resort
- League Bowling
- Magician Lord
- Metal Slug
- Mutation Nation
- NAM-1975
- Puzzled
- Real Bout Fatal Fury Special
- Samurai Shodown II
- Super Sidekicks
- World Heroes Perfect

Ninja Master's is included as a bonus game card in the Gold Limited Edition package.

Additional game cards were announced in February 2013. A five-volume set called "Neo Geo X Classics" features five game cards with three games on each making a total of 15 games. The volumes were released in June 2013 and feature the following games:

Volume 1

- Metal Slug 2
- Sengoku
- Top Hunter: Roddy & Cathy

Volume 2

- Samurai Shodown III
- Savage Reign
- Super Sidekicks 3

Volume 3

- Blazing Star
- The King of Fighters '96
- Kizuna Encounter: Super Tag Battle

Volume 4

- Garou: Mark of the Wolves
- Shock Troopers
- World Heroes 2 Jet

Volume 5

- Art of Fighting 3
- Blue's Journey
- The Last Blade

Each volume came bundled with a charging/data transfer cable for the handheld. The game cards include a firmware update for the Neo Geo X that updates the handheld to firmware v500. See the "Firmware Update" section of this article for update details.

The Neo Geo X Mega Pack Volume 1 was also released in June 2013. It came with one game card that contains all 15 games featured in Neo Geo X Classics Volumes 1-5. The Mega Pack was packaged in a similar case used for the original Neo Geo AES game cartridges, which can also be used as a carrying case for the Neo Geo X handheld. The charging/data transfer cable was included as well.

== Hardware ==
Comparison of Neo Geo X and Neo Geo AES resolution.

The device included a 4.3-inch LCD screen, SD card slot, A/V output, internal stereo speakers with a 3.5mm headphone jack. A micro USB port on the system is used for charging the battery. The screen's 480×272 pixels resolution is the same as the original PlayStation Portable and is close to the 16:9 aspect ratio.

The system was released as part of the Gold package, which includes the "Neo Geo X Station", a replica of the original Neo Geo AES console that functions as a charging/docking station with its own composite video out and HDMI output along with a functioning replica of the original Neo Geo AES arcade stick controller.

The Neo Geo X arcade stick controllers connect to the docking station via two USB ports. Original Neo Geo AES controllers, game cartridges and memory cards are not compatible with the Neo Geo X.

The handheld has an 8-way thumbstick for directional control, menu and start buttons, four face buttons and four shoulder buttons: L1, L2, R1, R2. The shoulder buttons are used for changing screen aspect ratio and pausing games. Buttons to adjust volume and brightness are located under the handheld.

The unit's BIOS and pre-installed games were initially stored on an internal SanDisk 2GB micro SD card; later hardware revisions use a chip installed directly on the motherboard. This chip has yet to be documented.

== Software ==
The console uses the Final Burn Alpha emulator running on a Linux-based operating system to play ROM images of Neo Geo games. This is a violation of Final Burn Alpha's license which prohibits any for-profit usage of the Emulator. The internal memory has no copy protection, allowing third party BIOSes and additional games to be directly installed on the unit. The operating system OpenDingux is used to load Final Burn Alpha, which runs .fba files when a game is selected. The system can be modified to run most emulators that will run on OpenDingux. The SD card slot could also be used to load other ROMs, but this requires modifying the SD card contact points.

== Reception ==
Consumer Reports recommended the system for enthusiasts of older games, but criticized the device's video quality on modern televisions. T3 commented that the replica AES docking station and included joystick added to the "overall retro charm" of the Gold package, but the handheld by itself might not be worth the money as Neo Geo games are now easily playable through other means.

Damien McFerran, writing for Eurogamer reacted positively to the quality of the handheld's gamepad and face buttons. He also complimented details such as the unit's packaging, which remained faithful to the original AES. However, he criticized the quality of the display, calling it "washed out" and writing that the scaling made games look "fuzzy and ill-defined." He also criticized the image quality of the outputs on the docking station, calling the HDMI output "muddy" and commenting that the composite output suffered from color bleeding and a hazing effect. McFerran also lamented that games were being distributed exclusively on physical media instead of being downloadable via Wi-Fi or through a connection to a PC. In addition, he mentioned that the emulated games were prone to screen tearing and audio issues. Concluding that it was not worth the premium price, he wrote "This is a console which has been created with the right intentions but the execution is sadly lacking."

== Controversy ==
Reportedly due to the low manufacturing standards employed by Tommo, in October 2013, SNK Playmore has publicly ordered Tommo to cease not only manufacture of the Neo Geo X, but to pull all existing stock from store shelves. Tommo in response claimed to be in compliance with the contract between the companies, which had recently been extended until 2016, and demanding that SNK retract the cease and desist claim.

In early 2014, in a press statement sent to gaming website Polygon, Tommo once again claimed full contractual compliance, and accused SNK Playmore of using underhanded tactics to undermine sales of their product, while failing to follow the routes of resolution put forward in the contract in the first place, and declining Tommo's offers of peaceful resolution. The CEO of the manufacturer said they were planning on "taking action" against SNK to protect their contractual rights.

== See also ==
- List of retro style video game consoles
- Dingoo A320
- GCW Zero
