= From Japan =

Japanese e-commerce site

FROM JAPAN Limited
- Native name: 株式会社FROM JAPAN
- Romanized name: Kabushikigaisha Furomu Japan
- Type: Public company (KK)
- Industry: ecommerce
- Founded: 30 March 2004
- Founder: Tomohiro Kuno (CEO)
- Headquarters: Chuo, Tokyo, Japan
- Website: www.fromjapan.co.jp

FROM JAPAN Limited（株式会社フロムジャパン Kabushikigaisha Furomu Japan）is a Japanese eCommerce site which provides international services to purchase and ship items from major Japanese online shopping and auction sites on behalf of users living outside of Japan.

== History ==
From Japan initially started as a Yahoo! Auctions Japan bidding proxy service in 2004. In the following year, the company added the service to order from major Japanese online shopping sites and continues to provide this service presently. They are expanding as a business providing a one stop simple solution for people residing outside of Japan that wish to shop from Japanese websites, but are unable to due to the language barrier or other restrictions such as stores not shipping overseas.

As one of Japan's first international E-Commerce proxies, they pride themselves in having the only userbase in Japan consisting of registered members residing in 196 countries.

The website operates in English, Chinese (Simplified and Traditional), French, Spanish, Korean, Indonesian, Thai, Italian, and Japanese.
The company also offers a service to "Simply put up a banner and start selling globally", aimed to support Japanese E-Commerce companies with large amounts of traffic from abroad that wish to expand their market overseas, contributing to the vitalization of small and middle-sized E-Commerce companies in Japan.

In 2022, the service was rebranded as "One Map by FROM JAPAN" and started supporting purchases from U.S. online shopping sites.

== Company timeline ==
- 2004
  - March – Established FROM JAPAN Co., Ltd. in Shirakawa, Koto, Tokyo
  - August – Began operating as a proxy service for bidding on Yahoo! Japan auctions
- 2005 October – Began operating as a proxy service for Japanese shopping sites
- 2006 – Business partnership with Yahoo! Hong Kong
- 2011
  - June – Headquarters moved to 2-7-4 Aomi, Koto, Tokyo
  - September – Introduced a service for Japanese E-Commerce sites to sell their products internationally by "Simply place a banner to sell overseas".
- 2012
  - October – Headquarters moved to 1-4-14 Hirakawacho, Chiyoda, Tokyo
  - Partnered with Rakuten, Inc. to offer a special price promotion on Rakuten items
- 2014 September – Headquarters moved to 1-1-1 Hirakawacho, Chiyoda, Tokyo
- 2015
  - August – Headquarters moved to 3–12 Kioicho, Chiyoda, Tokyo
  - October – Site relaunch with mobile support
- 2016
  - November – Headquarters moved to 2–1–5 Shinkawa, Chuo, Tokyo
- 2022
  - November – The service website was renamed to "One Map by FROM JAPAN"
  - Launched a proxy shopping service for U.S.-based e-commerce websites.
- 2023
  - February – Established an official partnership with Mercari and launched a proxy purchasing service for items listed on Mercari.
- 2024
  - January – Established an official partnership with Mercari US, operated by Mercari, Inc. (US), a subsidiary of Mercari Group, and launched a proxy purchasing service for items listed on Mercari US.
