= Exciting Soccer =

1984 video game

- Developer: Alpha Denshi
- Publisher: Alpha Denshi
- Platform: Arcade
- Release: JP: October 1983; NA: Late 1983
- Genres: Sports (association football)

Exciting Soccer (Note: Japanese: エキサイテイング・サツカ一, Hepburn: Ekisaitingu Sakkā) is an association football video game developed and released by Alpha Denshi for arcades in 1983. The top-down overhead perspective was later popularized by Tehkan World Cup (1985) from Tehkan.

A sequel, Exciting Soccer II, was released in 1984. Japan replaced Austria. It has new music, but gameplay is identical.

== Gameplay ==
Arcade screenshot

Up to two players can play. They can tackle, shoot, short pass, and long pass, and take corner kicks, throw-ins, and penalty shoot-outs. The game also includes cheerleaders, digitized voices and an influential overhead view. Six teams are available for selection: Italy, England, Brazil, West Germany, Austria, or France. In single-player mode, if the player wins, they start a new match with a harder opponent.

== Reception ==
In Japan, Game Machine listed Exciting Soccer on their November 1, 1983 issue as being the fourth most-successful new table arcade unit of the month.
