= Over Top =

1996 video game

- Arcade flyer
- Developer: ADK
- Publishers: SNK; ADK (NGCD)
- Director: Takashi Egashira
- Producer: Kazuo Arai
- Programmer: Yukinori Nishikata
- Composers: Keiichiro Segawa; Takao Oshima
- Platforms: Arcade, Neo Geo AES, Neo Geo CD
- Release: Arcade: JP: April 26, 1996; Neo Geo AES: JP: May 24, 1996; Neo Geo CD: JP: September 26, 1996
- Genre: Racing
- Mode: Single-player
- Arcade system: Neo Geo MVS

Over Top (Note: Japanese: オーバートップ, Hepburn: Ōbā Toppu) is a 1996 racing video game developed by ADK and published by SNK for the Neo Geo arcade and home platforms. It is the spiritual successor to Thrash Rally.

Themed around rallying, Over Top pits players against AI-controlled opponents in races across various locations. Directed by Magician Lord designer Takashi Egashira, the game was created by most of the same team that previously worked on several projects at ADK. Though it was initially launched for the Neo Geo MVS (arcade), the title was later released for both Neo Geo AES (home) and Neo Geo CD respectively, in addition of being re-released through download services for various consoles. Over Top was received with mixed reception from critics and reviewers since its initial release.

== Gameplay ==
Screenshot

Over Top is a top-down rally racing game where players observe from above and race across various locations by participating in a single race against AI-controlled opponents. Each location has their own weather conditions that change how the car is controlled through the track, as well as shortcuts to gain advantage against opponents.

The title uses a checkpoint in which the player gains extra time by reaching a tunnel at the end of each location. Failing to reach the checkpoint results in a game over screen unless players insert more credits into the arcade machine to continue playing. If a memory card is present, the player is allowed to save their progress and resume the last point the game saved at.

== Development and release ==
Over Top was created by most of the same team that previously worked on several projects at ADK, with Magician Lord designer Takashi Egashira acting as its director alongside producer Kazuo Arai. Yukinori Nishikata served as chief programmer, while the soundtrack was composed by Keiichiro Segawa and Takao Oshima. Several other people also collaborated in its development.

Over Top was first released by SNK for the Neo Geo MVS on April 26, 1996, and was then released for Neo Geo AES on May 24 of the same year. The Japanese AES release has since become one of the more expensive titles on the platform, with copies of the port fetching over US$4500 on the secondary video game collecting market. The game was later re-released in the same year for the Neo Geo CD by ADK on September 26. Hamster Corporation re-released the game as part of their ACA Neo Geo series for the PlayStation 4, Xbox One, Nintendo Switch, Windows, Android and iOS.

== Reception ==
Reception

Review scores
Publication	Score
AllGame	(Neo Geo) 3.5/5
M! Games	(Neo Geo) 33%
Nintendo Life	(Switch) 5/10

Over Top received mixed reception from critics and reviewers since release. AllGame's Kyle Knight commended its graphics, gameplay and replay value but criticized the introductory CGI sequence for being poorly done. MAN!AC's Andreas Knauf compared the game negatively with Neo Drift Out: New Technology, criticizing the Sega Mega Drive-esque visuals and sound design, as well as the simple controls.

Reviewing the Nintendo Switch re-release, Nintendo Life's Damien McFerran criticized the CGI graphics and introduction but commended the music and simple controls, also saying that the game lacks longevity that will not occupy players for long.
