= Ninja Commando =

1992 video game

- Developer: Alpha Denshi
- Publishers: SNK: Neo Geo CD; JP: ADK; NA: SNK
- Producer: Tsutomu Maruyama
- Programmers: Hiroyuki Ryū; Yuji Noguchi
- Artists: Hidemi Nagatomo; Hideyuki Kusano; Shinji Moriyama
- Composer: Yuka Watanabe
- Platforms: Arcade, Neo Geo AES, Neo Geo CD
- Release: Arcade: JP: April 30, 1992; NA: 1992; Neo Geo AES: JP/NA: May 29, 1992; Neo Geo CD: JP: October 31, 1994; NA: October 1996
- Genre: Run and gun
- Modes: Single-player, multiplayer
- Arcade system: Neo Geo MVS

Ninja Commando (Note: Japanese: ニンジャコマンドー, Hepburn: Ninja Komandō) is a vertically scrolling run and gun video game developed by Alpha Denshi and published by SNK for the Neo Geo arcade and home systems in 1992. It was released for the Neo Geo CD in 1994.

== Gameplay ==
Gameplay screenshot

The overall gameplay is similar to this of the run-and-gun classic Ikari Warriors, with the players battling their way up the top-down perspective screen. The players can choose between three ninja characters, all with differing abilities. Each of them has fighting game-style input commands that unleash their scroll-based ninpo special moves. As usual in the genre, the game's stages end with boss battles.

== Plot ==
An elite group of three young Ninja Commandos (Joe Tiger, an American descendant of the Kōga-ryū ninja whose weapons are shuriken, Ryu Eagle, the 23rd descendant of the famous ninja Fūma Kotarō (from the World Heroes series), who is using ninja magic fireballs in combat, and Rayar Dragon, the female ninja of the group, a British girl who has learned the ways of the Iga-ryū ninjutsu and whose weapon is a bow with flaming spirit arrows) from around the world must team-up to stop the villain Spider and his Mars Corporation from using a time machine to destroy the past and control the future. The three heroes chase after their enemy in seven time periods, including the Sengoku period in Japan (where Ryu avenges his ancestor by killing Oda Nobunaga), Ancient Egypt (fighting a floating recreation of Tutankhamen), the Stone Age, China in the era of Three Kingdoms (fighting against Lu Bu), and World War II.

== Release ==
Ninja Commando was originally released for the Neo Geo arcade machines on May 29, 1992. The Neo Geo CD version was released on October 31, 1994.

The game was re-released on the Wii's Virtual Console in North America on July 14, 2008 (though the Wii Virtual Console version, like most other Neo Geo games, only allows three continues per player, which makes the game very difficult to complete without saving progress). It was also re-released in December 2008 as one of five games in the PlayStation 2 game compilation ADK Damashii. Hamster Corporation re-released the game as part of their ACA Neo Geo series for the PlayStation 4, Xbox One, Nintendo Switch, Windows, Android and iOS.

== Reception ==
Contemporary reception

Review scores
Publication	Score
Consoles +	(Neo Geo) 92%
Computer and Video Games	(Neo Geo) 78%
Famitsu	(Neo Geo) 25/40
Game Informer	(Neo Geo) 23.5/30
GamePro	(Neo Geo) 17.5/20
Joypad	(Neo Geo) 83%
Mega Fun	(Neo Geo) 75%
Player One	(Neo Geo) 90%
Consolemania	(Neo Geo) 74%
Megablast	(Neo Geo) 81%
Mega Guide	(Neo Geo) Positive
Micom BASIC Magazine	(Neo Geo)
Neo Geo Freak	(Arcade) 12/20

In Japan, Game Machine listed Ninja Commando on their June 15, 1992 issue as being the eleventh most-successful table arcade unit of the month, outperforming titles such as Raiden. RePlay also reported the game to be the tenth most-popular arcade game at the time. The title was generally well received. The game's review in GamePro praised its "phenomenal!" graphics and called it overall "an excellent two-player cart" for Neo-Geo system. Three staff members of Game Informer rated Ninja Commando, respectively, 6.75, 8.0, and 8.75 out of 10. Famicom Tsūshin scored the Neo Geo version of the game a 25 out of 40.

=== Retrospective reviews ===
Retrospective assessments

Aggregate score
Aggregator	Score
GameRankings	(Wii) 55% (1 review)

Review scores
Publication	Score
AllGame	(Arcade) (Neo Geo)
Eurogamer	(Wii) 6/10
IGN	(Wii) 5.5/10
Nintendo Life	(Wii) 8/10

== See also ==
- Ninja Combat
- Ninja Master's -Haoh-Ninpo-Cho-
- Time Soldiers
