= Twinkle Star Sprites =

1996 video game

- Developer: ADK
- Publishers: SNK; ADK (Neo Geo CD, Saturn)
- Producer: Kazuo Arai
- Designer: Yoshiyasu Matsushita
- Programmer: Shōji Aomatsu
- Artist: Mimoli Fujinomiya
- Composers: Hideki Yamamoto; Hiroaki Kujirai; Hiroaki Shimizu
- Series: Twinkle Star Sprites
- Platforms: Arcade, Dreamcast, Neo Geo AES, Neo Geo CD, Sega Saturn
- Release: November 25, 1996: Arcade; JP: November 25, 1996; NA: December 1996 Neo Geo AES; JP: January 31, 1997 Neo Geo CD; JP: February 21, 1997 Saturn; JP: December 18, 1997 Dreamcast; JP: March 23, 2000
- Genre: Scrolling shooter
- Modes: Single-player, multiplayer
- Arcade system: Neo Geo MVS

Twinkle Star Sprites (Note: Japanese: ティンクルスタースプライツ, Hepburn: Tinkuru Sutā Supuraitsu) is a 1996 vertically scrolling shooter video game developed by ADK and published by SNK for the Neo Geo arcade and home platforms. It was ADK's last production for the Neo Geo. Two players are each in separate, side-by-side, vertically scrolling levels. Combinations of shots and timed power-ups damage the other player. These attacks also serve as counters to the opponent's attack.

== Gameplay ==
Arcade screenshot

There are two types of standard attacks: a normal shot and a charge-up shot. Each character starts with two bombs, which clean the screen while briefly granting the player invincibility. The two players' playfields are separated by a vertical bar; each playfield is independent of the other. Series of enemies arrive from the top of the screen. The player must destroy them in chains (combos), which will send one or more fireball projectiles the opponent's screen (Normal Attack). Shooting a Normal Attack several times reflects it back as a glowing Reverse Attack. If Reverse Attacks are reflected again, a number of powerful counterattacks in the shape of one or more indestructible enemies appear (Extra Attack). Reflecting many Reverse Attacks at once can instead summon a boss (Boss Attack).

- You can achieve a Perfect by destroying only one enemy in a formation and taking out the rest with a combo. Achieving a Perfect grants rewards such as bonus points, an additional gauge increase, faster attacks toward the opponent, increased speed for enemies in the opponent's field, and advancing the countdown for the appearance of special formations like blue orbs.
- The Extra Attacks and the Boss Attack vary from one character to another.
- The power gauge fills as the player destroys enemies, up to a maximum of three levels. By holding down the fire button and releasing when a certain level is reached, the player can launch a character-specific charge shot to assist in clearing enemies from the player's screen. At Level 1, the charge shot is launched. At Level 2, the charge shot and three Extra Attacks against the opponent are launched. At Level 3 (Max Level), the charge shot and a Boss Attack are launched. Firing charge shots at Level 2 and above will decrease the power gauge.
- When the internal countdown, which progresses as enemy formations appear and when a Perfect is achieved, reaches 0, a double exclamation mark appears. Either a special formation where all enemies are encased in bubbles appears along with the star coin that removes the bubbles, or a formation with a blue orb appears. If this orb is destroyed in a chain, the player achieves Fever status for the next several seconds. Chains created during Fever generate faster and more plentiful Normal Attacks per enemy destroyed, which can prove to be very dangerous to the opponent if large chains are made.
- Both players are given five life points at the start of a round.
- Colliding into an enemy costs one life point, but the player cannot be killed this way; if a player has one life point left, colliding with an enemy will reduce the player's health to one half of a life point. When this happens, the player's character is stunned for a short while and is reduced in speed and attack power for several seconds after recovery, all while left more vulnerable to opponent attacks.
- Getting hit by a Normal Attack, Reverse Attack, Extra Attack, Boss or the projectiles from a Boss cost three life points.
- The match is over when either player loses all life points.
- When a player takes damage, the opponent recovers life points. The amount recovered is 0.5 life points upon collision with an enemy and 1 life point from other attacks.
- If a round lasts longer than 102 seconds or neither player can meet the combo count requirement for a given time period for more than 20 seconds, a Death enemy appears. A player hit by this enemy loses immediately (Death Attack). The Death can be destroyed as any other enemy, but always comes back, harder to kill. Additionally, if a player is successful in volleying the Death character over to the opponent's side, and Death touches the opponent, the opponent dies instantly. This is a possible, though difficult, way to win. This, of course, would require the player to be skilled enough to avoid obstacles and not fire for more than 30 seconds.

== Development ==
Twinkle Star Sprites was developed by ADK.

== Release ==
While Twinkle Star Sprites was initially published as an arcade game by SNK for the Neo Geo platform, SNK later ported it to the Neo-Geo AES home console on January 31, 1997, and the Neo-Geo CD on February 21, 1997. On December 7, 1997, ADK developed and published an updated version of it to the Saturn, featuring an anime-style intro, tweaked gameplay, a new character and a bonus 'Fan Disc' full of extra materials. After SNK ended up buying ADK's intellectual properties, SNK released another enhanced version of Twinkle Star Sprites for the Dreamcast on March 23, 2000. To pay tribute to ADK, SNK included the Neo-Geo version along with four of ADK's other notable Neo-Geo titles in the compilation ADK Damashii, which was released for the PlayStation 2 exclusively in Japan on December 8, 2008. Twinkle Star Sprites later became available on the subscription service GameTap. It was released on the Wii Virtual Console for Japan on August 9, 2011. Hamster Corporation re-released the game as part of their ACA Neo Geo series for the PlayStation 4, Xbox One, Nintendo Switch, Windows, Android and iOS.

A port developed by DotEmu for Windows, Mac, Linux, and asm.js was released as part of the Humble NEOGEO 25th Anniversary Bundle on December 8, 2015. It was released on Steam on May 26, 2016; and on GOG.com on May 30, 2017.

Pony Canyon / Scitron released a limited-edition soundtrack album for this game on February 21, 1997.

== Reception ==
Reception

Review scores
| Publication | Score |
|---|---|
| AllGame | (NG) 4/5 |
| Consoles + | (NG) 85% |
| Famitsu | (SS) 53/100 (DC) 65/100 |
| IGN | (DC) 5.8/10 |
| Joypad | (SS) 40% |
| Video Games (DE) | (DC) 50/100 |
| Dreamcast Magazine (JP) | (DC) 6.0/10 |
| Saturn Fan | (SS) 7.6/10 |
| Sega Saturn Magazine (JP) | (SS) 7.00/10 |
| Video Chums | (NS) 8.3/10 |

In Japan, Game Machine listed Twinkle Star Sprites on their January 1, 1997 issue as being the fourteenth most-popular arcade game at the time. The game received generally mixed reception from critics since its release in arcades and other platforms. However, fan reception was positive; Readers of the Japanese Sega Saturn Magazine voted to give the Saturn port a 8.85 out of 10 score, ranking at the number 118 spot, indicating a large popular following. Readers of the Japanese Dreamcast Magazine also voted to give the Dreamcast port a 7.58 out of 10 score, ranking at the number 307 spot, indicating a popular following as well.

Both AllGame's Kyle Knight praised the audiovisual presentation and frantic gameplay, stating that Twinkle Star Sprites is "a refreshingly innovative title that manages to pull its seemingly incompatible elements together brilliantly." However, Knight criticized the amount of slowdown when too many objects are present on-screen. Consoles Plus' François Garnier also praised the presentation, visuals, animations, audio, longevity and playability. IGN's Colin Williamson reviewed the Dreamcast conversion, commending the addition of extra options in the release and multiplayer mode but criticized the low-resolution graphics and stated that playing single-player modes were not appealing in a long-term.

However, Joypad's Grégoire Hellot reviewed the Saturn version and gave the title an overall mixed outlook. In a similar manner, Video Games' Ralph Karels also gave the Dreamcast port a mixed overview, commending the unconventional gameplay but criticized the audio and visuals when compared to other shoot 'em ups on the Dreamcast.

== Legacy ==
Twinkle Star Sprites - La Petite Princesse (ティンクルスタースプライツ ～La Petite Princesse～) is a 2005 sequel to Twinkle Star Sprites originally created by SNK. At E3 2005, it was shown at the SNK Booth. It is an enhanced re-vamp of the Neo-Geo title featuring fully 3D environments and a host of new characters. Clearing the game opens up a perfectly emulated version of the original Neo-Geo title. There was a possibility that it would be released in North America, but after some consideration, at E3 2006, Ben Herman, president of SNK Playmore USA, stated that the game will not be published in North America. The decision was that it will not be marketable for the North American audience. The sequel was released exclusively in Japan for the PlayStation 2 on July 28, 2005, and was re-released for the same platform on November 22, 2006, with the green-label 'SNK Best Collection' added to the front cover. Content remains the same as the original print.
