= Crossed Swords (video game) =

1991 video game

- Developer: Alpha Denshi
- Publishers: SNK: Neo Geo CD; JP: ADK; NA: SNK
- Producer: Akira Ushizawa
- Designers: Hatsue Honbe; Hiroyuki Toda; Katsue Matsuzaki
- Programmers: Eiji Fukatsu; Hideo Kamoda; Makio Chiba
- Composer: Yuka Watanabe
- Series: Crossed Swords
- Platforms: Arcade, Neo Geo AES, Neo Geo CD
- Release: July 25, 1991: Arcade; JP: July 25, 1991; NA: 1991 Neo Geo AES; NA/JP: October 1, 1991 Neo Geo CD; JP: October 31, 1994
- Genres: Action role-playing, hack and slash
- Modes: Single-player, multiplayer
- Arcade system: Neo Geo MVS

Crossed Swords (Note: Japanese: クロス ソード, Hepburn: Kurosu Sōdo) is a 1991 action role-playing video game developed by Alpha Denshi and published by SNK for the Neo Geo arcade and home platforms. Its gameplay was similar to SNK's 1990 game The Super Spy, but with hack and slash combat instead of shooting and fist-fighting.

The game allowed cooperative gameplay with up to two players on the same screen. As only the player characters' silhouettes are visible on screen as wire-frame models, much like Punch-Out!!, the game's perspective may be considered either first-person or third-person. The game was later cited as an inspiration for the 2010 first-person fighting game Rage of the Gladiator. A sequel of the game entitled Crossed Swords II was released in Japan on May 2, 1995 for the Neo Geo CD, and was one of the few games designed specifically for the Neo Geo CD, rather than being an arcade port.

Hamster Corporation re-released the game as part of their ACA Neo Geo series for the PlayStation 4, Xbox One, Nintendo Switch, Windows, Android and iOS.

== Gameplay ==
Gameplay screenshot

Crossed Swords requires correct timing and movement to progress. The basic rule for the game is to defend first before striking. The player wields both a weapon and shield and can strafe, as well as guard the upper or middle part of the body. Two different weapon strikes are available, a regular attack and a thrusting attack. Weapon-based magic can also be used. Multiple paths through the game are available and the player has an option to skip the first and second chapters freely.

== Plot ==
In the enchanted land of Belkana all was well until plagues of creatures started rampaging through. From deep within the mountains of Graisia, the Demon Warlord Nausizz arose and led the attacks wiping out settlement after settlement. A brave warrior called "The Knight of the Journey" came a long way on a quest to stop these monstrosities. After aiding the Poor Village of Dio from the Caterdragon, the knight heads to the Castle Pulista, but as he is briefed by the king of the problems they face, an elite dark knight appears and kidnaps the princess. The knight fights his way through the enemy lands in the Matius Tower, the Gauda Fortress, the Land Battleship and finally passes the Entrance to the Devil World. Along his way, he is helped by loyalties of the kingdom. The knight battles through the Castle Graisia and comes face to face with Nausizz. As a demon with honour, Nausizz is so impressed with the knight's progress, that he has sent the princess back to Pulista. As the knight defeats Nausizz, he transforms into a fiendish demon dragon. The knight slays him and escapes the collapsing castle. Back in Castle Pulista the knight is offered to come and live with the king. Peace can proceed once more in Belkana.

== Reception ==
Reception

Review scores
Publication	Score
AllGame	(NG) 4/5
Computer and Video Games	(NG) 88/100
GamePro	(NG) 19/25
Joystick	(NG) 60%
Player One	(NG) 81%
Sinclair User	(AC) 83%
Game Zone	(AC) 3/5
Neo Geo Freak	(AC) 15/20
Zero	(AC) 2.5/5

In Japan, Game Machine listed Crossed Swords on their September 1, 1991 issue as being the tenth most-popular arcade game at the time. Likewise, RePlay reported the game to be the fifth most-popular arcade game at the time. The title received generally positive reception from critics since its release in arcades and other platforms.

AllGame's Kyle Knight praised the pseudo-3D visual presentation, audio and magic system, regarding its gameplay as interesting but criticized the controls for being sluggish and lack of enemy variety. Computer and Video Games' Paul Rand and Tim Boone commended the audiovisual presentation and playability but noted its high difficulty, while Rand criticized the limited number of moves. GamePro's Doctor Dave gave positive remarks to the graphics, audio and gameplay but considered Crossed Swords as a "straight-up swordfighter". Joystick's Jean-Marc Demoly compared the title with The Super Spy due to the perspective, commending its visuals, controls, sound and animations but regarded the gameplay as repetitive.

In a similar manner as Demoly, Player One's François Daniel also compared Crossed Swords with The Super Spy but praised the audiovisual presentation, difficulty and longevity. Other reviewers such as Sinclair User's John Cook compared the game with Dynamite Duke due to the perspective, while Game Zone's David Wilson and Zero's Doris Stokes compared it with Operation Wolf. Neo Geo Freak regarded it as a competent action title due to the pseudo-3D visuals and role-playing game elements but noted its difficulty.
