= Thrash Rally =

1991 video game

- Developer: Alpha Denshi
- Publishers: SNK; Neo Geo CD: JP: ADK; NA: SNK
- Director: Kazushige Hakamata
- Designers: Hideyuki Yamada; Mitsunari Ishida
- Programmers: Osamu Iijima; Teruaki Shirasawa; Toshiaki Naemura
- Artist: Yoshiaki Ono
- Composers: Hideki Yamamoto; Hiroaki Shimizu
- Platforms: Arcade, Neo Geo AES, Neo Geo CD
- Release: Arcade: WW: November 8, 1991; Neo Geo AES: WW: December 20, 1991; Neo Geo CD: JP: October 31, 1994
- Genre: Racing
- Modes: Single-player, multiplayer
- Arcade system: Neo Geo MVS

Thrash Rally (Note: Japanese: スラッシュ・ラリー, Hepburn: Surasshu Rarī) (Note: Also known as Rally Chase (Japanese: ラリー チェイス, Hepburn: Rarī Cheisu) in Japan on the Neo Geo CD.) is a 1991 racing video game developed by Alpha Denshi and released by SNK for the Neo Geo arcade and home platforms. It was followed by Over Top, a spiritual successor, in 1996.

Hamster Corporation re-released the game as part of their ACA Neo Geo series for the PlayStation 4, Xbox One, Nintendo Switch, Windows, Android and iOS.

== Gameplay ==
Gameplay screenshot

Players begin by choosing a vehicle based on handling, acceleration, and overall speed. The game is played from an overview perspective with the camera focused on the players car at all times. The races take place from the 1992 World Rally Championship and the 1992 Paris–Cape Town Dakar Rally with a variety of terrain.

== Reception ==
Reception

Review scores
Publication	Score
AllGame	(Arcade) (Neo Geo)
Famitsu	(Neo Geo) 22 / 40
GameFan	(Neo Geo) 314 / 400
Next Generation	(Neo Geo CD)
Consolemania	(Neo Geo) 79 / 100
Consoles +	(Neo Geo) 89%
Gamest	(Arcade) 26/50
Génération 4	(Neo Geo) 83%
Hobby Consolas	(Neo Geo) 95 / 100 (Neo Geo) 89 / 100
Joypad	(Neo Geo) 79%
Joystick	(Neo Geo) 81%
Mega Fun	(Neo Geo) 85%
Micom BASIC Magazine	(Neo Geo)
Player One	(Neo Geo) 85%

In Japan, Game Machine listed Thrash Rally as the sixteenth most successful arcade game of December 1991. On release, Next Generation reviewed the Neo-Geo version of the game, rating it one star out of five, and stated that "for mindless fun, Rally Chase comes in at about average". Famicom Tsūshin scored the Neo Geo version a 22 out of 40. Setsu of French magazine HardCore Gamers drew comparison with Micro Machines.
