= Master of Syougi =

1995 video game

- Arcade flyer
- Developer: ADK
- Publisher: SNK
- Producers: Kazuo Arai; Kenichi Sakanishi
- Designer: Tomohiko Ishida
- Programmers: Eiji Fukatsu; Junpei Morita; Masaaki Gonohe
- Artist: Yukari Shinozaki
- Composers: Hideki Yamamoto; Keiichiro Segawa; Takao Oshima
- Platforms: Arcade, Neo Geo AES, Neo Geo CD, Neo Geo Pocket, Neo Geo Pocket Color
- Release: September 28, 1995: Arcade; JP: September 28, 1995 Neo Geo AES; JP: October 13, 1995 Neo Geo CD; JP: October 20, 1995 Neo Geo Pocket; JP: November 20, 1998 Neo Geo Pocket Color; JP: March 19, 1999
- Genre: Board game
- Modes: Single-player, multiplayer
- Arcade system: Neo Geo MVS

Master of Syougi (Note: Japanese: 将棋の達人, Hepburn: Shōgi no Tatsujin) is a 1995 shogi video game developed by ADK and published by SNK for the Neo Geo arcade and home platforms. It was ported to the Neo Geo CD the same year. It was ported in a scaled-down version to the Neo Geo Pocket and later given improved graphics on the Neo Geo Pocket Color. The game was only released in Japan.

Hamster Corporation re-released the game as part of their ACA Neo Geo series for the Nintendo Switch and PlayStation 4 in April 2026, the first SNK title to be released in the series since its retirement in 2019.

== Gameplay ==
Neo Geo version screenshot.

Master of Syougi is a shogi (Japanese chess) game. In single player mode the player must compete against computerized opponents (represented by a digitized photograph) to win the tournament. In two player mode, each player competes against each another.

== Reception ==
Reception

Review score
Publication	Score
Neo Geo Freak	(Arcade) 9/20

In Japan, Game Machine listed Shōgi no Tatsujin: Master of Syougi as the twelfth most successful arcade game of October 1995, outperforming titles such as Voltage Fighter Gowcaizer.
