= Sky Soldiers =

1988 video game

- North American arcade flyer
- Developer: Alpha Denshi
- Publishers: JP: SNK; NA: Romstar
- Platform: Arcade
- Release: JP: July 1988; NA: September 1988
- Genre: Scrolling shooter
- Modes: Single-player, multiplayer

Sky Soldiers is a vertically scrolling shooter video game developed by Alpha Denshi and released to arcades in 1988 by Romstar in North America and SNK in the rest of the world. The game features a time travel theme as well as an organized weapon select screen at the beginning of each stage.

== Story ==
In the year 2090, humankind invents a supercomputer called Desmoura to manage Earth's environment. Capable of replicating itself in various technological inventions, Desmoura achieves sentience as it sets itself around Earth's orbit. It becomes so powerful when it gains the capabilities to build a time machine in a matter of twenty years. Without warning or reason, Desmoura sends various war machines back in time by 100 years and starts attacking humankind's past technological feats possibly to change Earth's history. Special space fighters called STEALTHs are sent to fly against Desmoura's forces, attack the affected timelines and eventually destroy Desmoura.

== Gameplay ==
Players travelled back in time starting in Great Britain 1945, Germany 1915, Japan 1945, Germany 1944, Vietnam 1974, France 1914, Russia 1974 and finally the space station in the present time, 2110. Each time stage has two levels, both ending in a boss battle save for the final stage, resulting in a total of 15 Areas.

The STEALTH ship weapon system is accessed in the beginning of each stage. The ship's main shot consists of a semi-automatic Wave Shot. The ship's bomb weapons include forward firing Missiles, Fire Balls, Homing missiles and the Buster bomb. The ship can be equipped with only one bomb weapon from either category at a time. The ship can only be loaded with a certain number of Bomb weapons and they can only be resupplied at the end of the level. The only pick-up item in the game is a parachuting human pilot shot down from malfunctioning fighter planes/jets; collecting these pilots results in random Bonus Points or cannon power-ups, depending on the letter on the parachute itself.

== Reception ==
In Japan, Game Machine listed Sky Soldiers as the fourth most successful table arcade unit of August 1988, outperforming titles like Ninja Spirit.
