= Puzzled (video game) =

1990 video game

- Developer: SNK
- Publisher: SNK
- Producer: Eikichi Kawasaki
- Composer: Yoshihiko Kitamura
- Platforms: Arcade, Neo Geo AES, Neo Geo CD
- Release: Arcade: WW: November 20, 1990; Neo Geo AES: JP/EU: July 1, 1991; Neo Geo CD: JP: September 9, 1994; NA: October 1996
- Genre: Puzzle
- Modes: Single-player, multiplayer
- Arcade system: Neo Geo MVS

Puzzled, released in Japan as Joy Joy Kid (Note: Japanese: ジョイジョイキッド, Hepburn: Joi Joi Kiddo), is a 1990 tile-matching puzzle video game developed and published by SNK for the Neo Geo arcade and home platforms. The game was ported to mobile phones in 2005, then was re-published by D4 Enterprise on the Wii Virtual Console in June 2011, and is also one of the twenty games that came pre-loaded on the Neo Geo X console released in 2012. Hamster Corporation re-released the game as part of their ACA Neo Geo series for the PlayStation 4, Xbox One, Nintendo Switch, Windows, Android and iOS.

== Gameplay ==
Gameplay screenshot

The visuals of Puzzled look a lot like Tetris and the core gameplay is the same: the player controls tetrominos falling from the top of the screen, and filling a horizontal lines clears it, but the objective is to clear a vertical path for a hot air balloon initially trapped at the bottom of each level, enabling it to fly off the top of the playing field and moving up to the next level of a tower.

The tower is divided into multiple floors, with 10 levels per floor, totaling 60 different puzzles. Some levels feature varied obstacles like robots floating around the puzzle to attack the balloon, regenerating blocks, and gold blocks that need to be cleared multiple times before disappearing. The player can also use a power-up called an "L-Ball": a meter fills up as lines are cleared, and once ready, the player can trigger a lightning ball to explode outwards from the balloon's current location, removing surrounding blocks.

== Reception ==
Reception

Aggregate score
Aggregator	Score
GameRankings	(Switch) 30%

Review scores
Publication	Score
Nintendo Life	(Switch) 3 / 10
AllGame	(Neo Geo)
Hobby Hi-Tech	(Neo Geo CD) 6 / 10
Joystick	(Neo Geo) 90% (Neo Geo) 91%
Mega Fun	(Neo Geo) 76%
Micom BASIC Magazine	(Neo Geo)
Neo Geo Freak	(Arcade) 13 / 20
Player One	(Neo Geo) 92%
Tilt	(Neo Geo) 14 / 20

In Japan, Game Machine listed Puzzled on their December 15, 1990 issue as being the most-successful table arcade unit of the month, outperforming titles such as Carrier Air Wing and Raiden.

The graphics of Puzzled were described as being simplistic and unremarkable but well-designed and efficient. The sound effects were also considered minimalistic but enjoyable for a game of this type.

The game's multiplayer portion was criticized for not featuring any interactions between the two simultaneous players.
