= Ninja Master's =

1996 video game

- Arcade flyer
- Developer: ADK
- Publishers: SNK: Neo Geo CD; JP: ADK; NA: SNK
- Producer: Hiroyuki Toda
- Designer: Kazuhiro Shibata
- Programmer: Teruaki Shirasawa
- Artist: Kazushige Hakamata
- Composers: Hiroaki Kujirai; Hiroaki Shimizu; Yuka Watanabe
- Platforms: Arcade, Neo Geo AES, Neo Geo CD
- Release: Arcade: JP: May 27, 1996; NA: June 1996; Neo Geo AES: JP: June 28, 1996; NA: 1996; Neo Geo CD: JP: September 27, 1996
- Genre: Fighting
- Modes: Single-player, multiplayer
- Arcade system: Neo Geo MVS

Ninja Master's: The Scroll of the Ninja Emperor (Note: Japanese: ニンジャマスターズ ～覇王忍法帖～, Hepburn: Ninja Masutāzu ～ haō nin hōjō ～; lit. "Ninja Master's Scrolls of the Supreme Ninja Arts") is a 1996 fighting game developed by ADK and published by SNK for the Neo Geo arcade and home platforms. Ninja Master's was the sixth and final fighting game produced by ADK, following the four games in the World Heroes series and Aggressors of Dark Kombat. It was later featured in the 2008 compilation ADK Damashii for the PlayStation 2. Ninja Master's was also re-released on the Neo-Geo X handheld system in 2012, and for the Wii Virtual Console in 2013. Hamster Corporation re-released the game as part of their ACA Neo Geo series for the PlayStation 4, Xbox One, Nintendo Switch, Windows, Android and iOS.

== Gameplay ==
Gameplay screenshot showcasing a match between Sasuke Sarutobi and Tenho

Ninja Master's follows the conventions of many previous 2D fighting games released for the Neo Geo. The player must defeat their opponent in combat in a series of best-two-out-of-three matches. Characters can change between using the character's weapon or fight hand-to-hand during the middle of combat. Like the Art of Fighting series, Ninja Master's features a super meter.

== Fighters ==
- Sasuke Sarutobi - the main hero of the game. A ninja expert and betrayer of his own ninja clan who seeks to avenge his father's death.
- Houoh - a skilled exorcist who is unsure of his own powers.
- Goemon Ishikawa - a ninja thief whose goal is to collect the largest treasures in Japan.
- Kamui - the rival to Sasuke. An old acquaintance of Sasuke's, Kamui hopes to destroy him after Sasuke has forsaken the clan.
- Karasu - a serial killer and bodyguard who is obsessed with ravens (Karasu means "Raven" in Japanese).
- Kasumi Kotenkenbu - a ninja apprentice whose grandmother prevents her from going after Nobunaga. Not to be confused with the character of same name from the later Tecmo's Dead or Alive.
- Natsume - an orphan who, after having a nightmare, strives to kill Nobunaga. She reappears in a hack of Sega's Streets of Rage 2 called Girls' Paradise.
- Oda Nobunaga - the final boss of the game. A tyrant brainwashed by the demon known as Haoh, Nobunaga sets out to conquer the world.
- Raiga - a renowned bounty hunter whose mission is to defeat Goemon.
- Ranmaru Mumiyo Kagura - the sub-boss of the game. An immortal and loyal servant to Nobunaga, Ranmaru attempts to vanquish Haoh, who possesses Nobunaga.
- Tenho - an old Japanese man who was abandoned in Korea at birth.
- Kongouarahan Unzen - a former monk in search of the best aspect of life.

Like various ADK games, SNK Playmore also revived characters from Ninja Master's in later releases. The main character of Ninja Master's, Sasuke, appears as an SNK character card in SNK vs. Capcom: Card Fighters DS.

== Reception ==
Reception

Review scores
Publication	Score
AllGame	(NG) 3/5
Consoles +	(NG) 80%
Electronic Gaming Monthly	(NG) 4/10
M! Games	(NG) 53%
Next Generation	(NG) 3/5
Nintendo Life	(Wii) 8/10
Manci Games	(NG) B
Neo Geo Freak	(AC) 13/20

In Japan, Game Machine listed Ninja Master's on their July 1, 1996 issue as being the fourteenth most-popular arcade game at the time. The game received generally positive reception from critics since its release in arcades and other platforms.

In a retrospective review of the Neo Geo AES version, AllGame's Kyle Knight called it "a fairly good fighter that could've been a lot more." Covering the Neo Geo AES version, the four reviewers of Electronic Gaming Monthly offered some praise for the game's special moves and the ability to fight with or without a weapon, but generally panned Ninja Master's for its failure to distinguish itself from the many previous Neo Geo fighting games and for its outdated graphics, particularly the small character sprites and lack of scaling. Shawn Smith and Ken Williams remarked that the game's mediocrity is shocking given SNK's history and the $150 price tag. In contrast, a Next Generation critic found originality to be the game's biggest asset, opining that although Ninja Master's lacks the balance and smoothness of the best Neo Geo fighting games, the ability to switch between weapons and bare-handed combat in mid-fight "adds dramatically to the strategy."

Consoles Plus's Maxime Roure commended the detailed sprites, fluid animations, longevity and playability. MAN!AC's Andreas Knauf felt mixed in regards to the audiovisual presentation and Samurai Shodown-style character roster but criticized the jerky animations and lack of innovations. In contrast, Nintendo Life's Corbie Dillard regarded Ninja Master's as one of the more unique fighting games released on Neo Geo stating due to the ability to change between two fighting styles, stating that "at times it feels like a combination of Samurai Shodown and King of Fighters rolled into one game." Ken Pyle of Manci Games praised the feudal-Japan- atmosphere, fast gameplay and responsive controls but felt mixed in regards to the character roster and criticized the audio design.

In 2014, HobbyConsolas identified Ninja Master's as one of the twenty best games for the Neo Geo CD.
