= Legend of Success Joe =

1991 video game

- Japanese Neo Geo AES cover art
- Developer: Wave Corporation
- Publisher: SNK
- Producer: Teruo Ohira
- Designers: Kenichiro Matsumoto; Koji Tomoto
- Programmers: Hirofumi Sakaue; Takashi Iehara
- Series: Ashita no Joe
- Platforms: Arcade, Neo Geo AES
- Release: Arcade: JP: July 1991; EU: 1991; Neo Geo AES: JP: 30 August 1991
- Genres: Beat 'em up, fighting, sports
- Mode: Single-player
- Arcade system: Neo Geo MVS

Legend of Success Joe (Note: Also known as Tomorrow's Joe Legend (Japanese: あしたのジョー伝説, Hepburn: Ashita no Jō Densetsu) in Japan.) is a boxing video game developed by Wave Corporation and released for the Neo Geo arcade and home system. The game is based on Tomorrow's Joe, a manga created by Tetsuya Chiba and Asao Takamori in the early 1970s that was also adapted into several anime series. The game is also the first Neo Geo title developed by a third-party company. The game had a home system launch price of approximately US$200.

== Gameplay ==
Gameplay screenshot

The player stars as Joe Yabuki, an aspiring boxer, as he goes from an unknown kid from the rough side of town to a boxing champion. The game follows the traditional beat 'em up format, with some portions taking place inside a boxing ring and others taking place in the back alleyways, as Joe trains, fights thugs, and then fights in the boxing ring.

== Reception ==
Reception

Review scores
Publication	Score
Joypad	(Neo Geo) 60%
Joystick	(Neo Geo) 60%
Mega Fun	(Neo Geo) 40%
Micom BASIC Magazine	(Neo Geo)
Player One	(Neo Geo) 58%

In Japan, Game Machine listed Legend of Success Joe on their August 15, 1991, issue as being the tenth-most successful table arcade unit of the month, outperforming titles such as Hat Trick Hero. It received negative reviews and is widely considered one of the worst games for the Neo Geo, with common complaints being poor controls, graphics and animation on a system that was touted as not having these problems.
