= Aggressors of Dark Kombat =

1994 video game

- Developer: ADK
- Publishers: SNK: Neo Geo CD; JP: ADK; NA: SNK
- Platforms: Arcade, Neo Geo AES, Neo Geo CD
- Release: Arcade: JP: July 26, 1994; NA: 1994; Neo Geo AES: NA/JP: August 26, 1994; Neo Geo CD: JP: January 13, 1995; NA: October 1996
- Genre: Fighting
- Modes: Single-player, multiplayer
- Arcade system: Neo Geo MVS

Aggressors of Dark Kombat (Note: Known in Japan as Tsūkai GANGAN Kōshinkyoku (Japanese: 痛快GANGAN行進曲; "Thrilling Intense March")) is a 1994 fighting video game developed by ADK and published by SNK for the Neo Geo arcade and home platforms. The game's defining feature was that, while it uses a generally 2D format, characters can move towards or away from the screen (somewhat similar to the "Oversway" system from the later SNK title Fatal Fury 3: Road to the Final Victory). While some reviews praised this mechanic, critics generally remarked that it offers no meaningful innovation and that the game is generic and lacking in depth. Though a modest success, Aggressors of Dark Kombat failed to match the popularity of the leading SNK fighters.

== Gameplay ==
Gameplay screenshot

The game's major innovation is the ability of fighters to move virtually continuously towards or away from the screen as well as left and right in a similar manner to some 1980s arcade fighting games like Taito's Violence Fight, SNK's Street Smart and Atari's Pit-Fighter. Because of this, unlike many other 2D fighting games, jumping is done with the use of an action button. Unlike many SNK fighting games, the "D" button is not used, and only two action buttons are used for attacking, one for punches and one for kicks. Grappling and grabbing the opponent is the focus of the gameplay: the opponent can counter being grabbed and break free as well. Also featured is weapon play (another mechanic akin to beat 'em ups, such as Technōs' Renegade and The Combatribes). Weapons can be picked up and thrown, or used in special and standard attacks. Weapons are thrown into the ring by spectators in the background.

The health bar has several layers of colors to indicate the health. There is also a "Crazy Meter" at the bottom of the screen. It is built up as a character attacks; this gives them a special attack that will defeat the opponent outright. It is called the "Gan Gan Attack" in Japan, and "Crazy Attack" internationally.

Battles are joined by irreverent, sometimes humorous pre-fight banter from characters. The dialogue differs from opponent to opponent, and the fight is immediately presaged by a clash of two small images of the combatants' eyes in the center of the screen. There are almost no differences between the Japanese release of this game and the international versions aside from the name, and the removal of blood when using a critical hit on an opponent.

== Characters ==
The game features eight selectable characters. The characters are not named anywhere during gameplay, which is unusual for the genre. Seven of the characters are new, but Kotaro Fūma returns from World Heroes.

- Joe Kusanagi - Also known as the "Red Panther of Honmoku". Joe is the most powerful and famous brawler of the Kantō region. Bored from the lack of good opponents in his area, he hears rumors about strong fighters to the west, so he travels there to confront them. Apart from this game, he makes a cameo appearance in one of Kisarah's attacks in Neo Geo Battle Coliseum.
- Goh Kidokoro - Also known as the "Strong Spirit from Naniwa". Goh is the most famous brawler in the Kansai region, and has his own gang. Goh got the news about the arrival of the "Red Panther from Honmoku" and is awaiting a fight against this new menace in order to further his goal of nationwide conquest.
- Sheen Genus - Also known as the "Rising Tiger". He is a Canadian amateur wrestler who wants to create his own professional wrestling league, and so is searching for strong people to join him. Sheen is the wrestler of the game and a rival to Leonhalt. He appears in SNK vs. Capcom: Card Fighters DS as an action card.
- Kisarah Westfield - Also known as the "Naive Tomboy". She is an English school girl who has a reputation for being a femme fatale in Japanese schools. However, Kisarah falls in love with Joe Kusanagi and chases him to coerce Joe into being her boyfriend. She is the only female fighter in this game. Kisarah appears as a selectable character in Neo Geo Battle Coliseum and as an SNK character card in SNK vs. Capcom: Card Fighters DS.
- Bobby Nelson - Also known as the "Brown Bullet". He is an African-American boy who is a basketball player and wishes to be famous. To achieve his objective, Bobby traverses the world, waiting to be discovered. Bobby is the fastest and smallest character in the game, and the only one who always has a weapon (specifically, his basketball). He appears in SNK vs. Capcom: Card Fighters DS as an action card, along with Sean Matsuda from Street Fighter III, who is also a basketball player.
- Kotaro Fuuma - Also known as the "Angry Hurricane". He got lost during one of his travels through time and landed in 1994 Japan, where the game takes place, and became involved in the ensuing fights. Like the rest of characters, Fūma does not have powers (only his "Enryūha" signature move make the transition from World Heroes), but in exchange, he gains many combo moves. He would also be playable in Neo Geo Battle Coliseum, with his World Heroes series moveset.
- Lee Hae Gwon - Also known as the "White Fang". A Korean martial artist who lives in Japan and works for a school. He seeks revenge against the brawler who has been causing disasters in his school: Leonhalt Domador. Lee is one of the fastest characters in the game, with a good arsenal of kicks and various taekwondo techniques.
- Leonhalt Domador - Also known as the "Black Bull". As a Spanish brawler who escapes his native country becoming a refugee, he goes to Japan to become the strongest fighter of all, no matter what. Leonhalt is the tallest, slowest and most powerful fighter from the game. His rival is Sheen Genus.

== Release ==
The game was released in arcades. It was later ported to SNK's Neo-Geo AES and Neo Geo CD consoles.

In 2008 it was included with a few other Neo-Geo titles by ADK on the ADK Damashii Game Collection released in Japan for the PlayStation 2 only. It was also included on the Japanese NeoGeo Mini in 2018. It was re-released on other NeoGeo Mini systems: the limited edition Christmas, Samurai Shodown and Samurai Spirits versions.

== Reception ==
Reception

Review scores
Publication	Score
AllGame	2/5 (NG)
Electronic Gaming Monthly	7/10 (NG)
Famitsu	25/40 (NG)
Next Generation	3/5 (NG); 2/5 (NGCD)
The Electric Playground	7/10 (NGCD)
Hobby Consolas	92/100 (NG)
Ultimate Future Games	59% (NGCD)

Awards
Publication	Award
EGM (1994)	Strangest Game
VideoGames (1994)	Best Neo•Geo Game (runner-up)

The game was met with generally underwhelming reviews from critics, many of whom felt the large sprites and ability to move through different planes ultimately do not make Aggressors of Dark Kombat intrinsically different from or as deep as fighting games which preceded it, though it had its share of defenders. Ultimate Future Games, in its review of the Neo Geo CD version, summed up that "It's nothing we haven't already seen before, and seen with more finesse at that." The reviewer said every aspect of the game seemed slapdash, citing as examples the near-illegible fonts, dull music, poorly translated English manual, sparse animation, and a setup which is not conducive to stylish or deep fighting. GamePro panned the AES version of the game, saying it "combines aspects of Art of Fighting, World Heroes, and Street Fighter without coming close to the complexity or challenge of any of them." They complained of unresponsive controls and the excessively long string of commands required to execute Crazy moves, and remarked that though the sprites are large, they are nonetheless unimpressive due to the uninteresting animations and unoriginal character designs. The four reviewers of Electronic Gaming Monthly acknowledged the mediocre animations and character designs, but asserted that the game is fun if given a chance, with the strong points including the ability to fight in multiple planes and the humorous Crazy moves.

Next Generation reviewed the AES version of the game and summarized, "Although moves are difficult to pull off, ADK's crisp look and powerful action make it well worth the trouble." However, Next Generation later reviewed the Neo Geo CD version, and stated that despite SNK marketing the game as a 3D fighter, it is purely 2D, and that the ability to fight in multiple planes, while a decent effort at innovation, ultimately has little impact on the gameplay. The reviewer concluded that "From graphics to moves to sound effects, almost every element in this game is more-or-less average and is not likely to stand out from the enormous 2D fighting library of Neo-Geo." The Electric Playground praised the game's controls and efforts at innovation, but felt the formulaic characters and shallow gameplay cause it to wear thin after a few play sessions. Hobby Consolas commented that the one-round and four health bars format results in fights which are long, interesting, and well-balanced. They also praised the high quality sound effects and large sprites enabled by the massive Neo Geo cartridges, and the excellent Spanish voice acting. However, they concluded that the small number of playable characters prevented them from unreservedly recommending the game, though they emphasized that it is otherwise outstanding and expressed a desire to see a Neo Geo CD version.

In Japan, Game Machine listed Aggressors of Dark Kombat in their September 1, 1994 issue as being the eighth most-popular arcade game at the time. In North America, RePlay reported the game to be the eighteenth most-popular arcade game at the time. According to Famitsu, the AES version sold 6,143 copies in its first week on the market.

The title was named the "Strangest Game of 1994" by Electronic Gaming Monthly. In a retrospective review, Allgame echoed contemporary response to the game by remarking that the ability to move between different planes "introduces some new strategy elements in trying to approach the opponent, [but] it isn't enough to redeem the game from its overall mediocrity." The reviewer did argue that the animated backgrounds somewhat made up for the poorly animated characters, but said the gameplay suffers from small move lists and an overall lack of skill involved in winning.

== See also ==
- ADK
- World Heroes
- NeoGeo Battle Coliseum
- List of fighting games
