= ADK Corporation =

Former Japanese video game developer

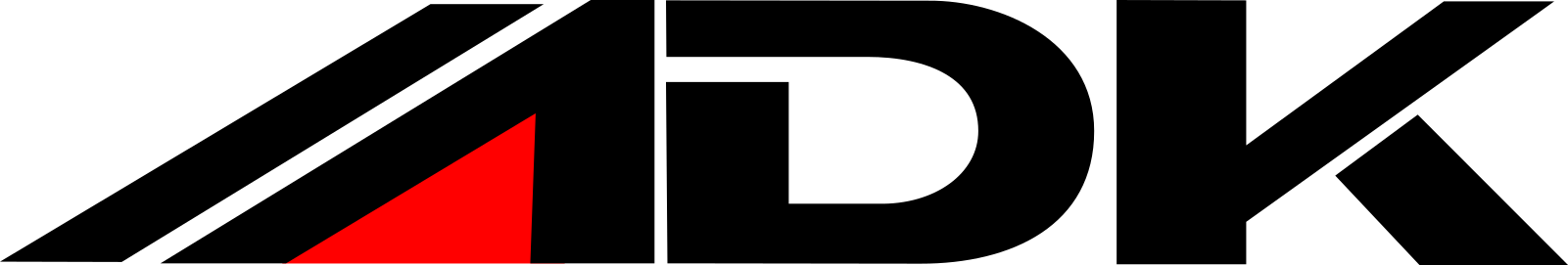
- Formerly: Alpha Denshi
- Type: Private
- Industry: Video games
- Founded: July 1980
- Defunct: 2003
- Fate: Closed, properties sold
- Successor: SNK
- Headquarters: Ageo, Saitama, Japan
- Products: Arcade video games Video games

ADK Corporation (Japanese: 株式会社エーディーケイ, Hepburn: Kabushiki Kaisha ADK), formerly known as Alpha Denshi Corporation (アルファ電子株式会社), was a Japanese video game developer founded in 1980. ADK began as a developer of arcade games and is best known for their library of SNK Neo Geo titles, including for its home consoles, produced in partnership with SNK. Most notable among these are their fighting games and, in particular, the World Heroes series and Aggressors of Dark Kombat. The company closed with properties sold to SNK Playmore in 2003.

== History ==
=== Early years ===
ADK was founded in July 1980 in Ageo, Saitama, Japan. At the time, it was known as Alpha Denshi or Alpha for short. Originally a producer of audio and telecommunications equipment, Alpha first ventured into video games in 1980 with two arcade titles: Dorachan (ドラちゃん) by Craul Denshi and Tehkan's Shogi (将棋), a basic Japanese chess game. Dorachan was recalled shortly after release due to unlicensed usage of the fictional character Doraemon.

Despite an inauspicious start, Alpha continued to develop arcade games in 1981. Janputer (ジャンピュータ), published by Sanritsu Giken Corp, was one of the earliest arcade Mahjong titles and helped Alpha to establish themselves in the industry. That same year, Craul Denshi released Alpha's Crush Roller (Make Trax), a maze video game similar to Pac-Man. By 1982, Alpha was able to finance their own independent development of Talbot, another maze game, which they licensed to Volt Electronics for distribution. In 1983, Alpha expanded into sports games with their self-published Exciting Soccer and two Champion Baseball titles for Sega. Alpha would produce several more games for Sega through the mid 1980s while continuing to publish others on their own.

=== Partnership with SNK ===
Alpha Denshi began developing games almost exclusively for SNK hardware in 1987. In 1990, SNK was developing a new unified video game platform for both the home and arcades. Alpha was a close partner in the process and contributed much of the hardware design for what would eventually become the Neo Geo. The 1990 Neo Geo arcade launch lineup included two Alpha titles: Magician Lord and Ninja Combat. Magician Lord was also later included as a pack-in game for the 1991 home console, the Neo Geo AES.

In 1992, following the revitalization of the fighting game genre by Capcom's Street Fighter II, Alpha developed World Heroes with assistance from SNK. It would go on to sell over 200,000 copies that year, and its popularity quickly spawned multiple sequels. In 1993, Alpha Denshi shortened its name to ADK, short for Alpha Denshi Kabushiki gaisha (Japanese for "share company"). Shortly thereafter, ADK agreed to become an exclusive developer for SNK. In 1994, SNK launched the CD-ROM-based version of the Neo Geo, the Neo Geo CD. ADK soon began porting their existing library to the new platform. In addition, ADK developed three new exclusive titles for the Neo Geo CD: Crossed Swords II, ADK World and ZinTrick.

In the late 1990s, newer fifth generation consoles with 3D graphics and CD audio were becoming more popular with consumers and an attractive target for video game developers. Still under exclusive contract, ADK was only allowed to develop two Sega Saturn ports: World Heroes Perfect and Twinkle Star Sprites, both published by SNK. Meanwhile, SNK released the short-lived Neo Geo Pocket and Pocket Color handhelds in 1998 and 1999. ADK developed only eight titles for the platform which was dwarfed in sales by Nintendo's Game Boy Color and lasted less than three years. ADK was also the only third-party developer for the ill-fated Hyper Neo Geo 64 arcade hardware, by developing Beast Busters Second Nightmare.

During this same time, the developer Miraisoft released two PlayStation games with ADK included in the credits. This aroused suspicion at the time because while Miraisoft was officially listed as an "affiliate company" of ADK, ADK was still under exclusive contract with SNK and could not release PlayStation games themselves. While no further link between the two companies was publicly announced, it has been suspected that ADK used the affiliate brand to circumvent SNK's terms. In any event, ADK continued to develop Neo Geo games until 2001 when SNK declared bankruptcy.

=== Final years ===
ADK was already facing financial difficulty and had reduced its workforce prior to SNK's demise. In 2000, ADK released its last video game title, Dynamite Slugger, and was primarily focused on developing content for Japanese i-mode-based mobile devices. A variety of content was developed spanning informational, social networking and digital pet sites. However, ADK could not reverse their fortunes and ultimately declared bankruptcy in 2003. By this time, the successor to SNK, SNK Playmore, had already been established and was actively producing video games. Soon after the bankruptcy, SNK Playmore bought up ADK's relinquished intellectual properties, including ADK trademark.

=== Legacy ===
Since the company's buyout and dissolution, ADK characters started to appear in SNK crossover games, with the later retroactively recognizing ADK's characters as its own. First, in 2005, SNK released a sequel to ADK's Twinkle Star Sprites, called Twinkle Star Sprites - La Petite Princesse for the PlayStation 2. In that same year came Neo Geo Battle Coliseum, a console and arcade fighting game featuring several characters from the World Heroes and Aggressors of Dark Kombat franchises. In 2006 (2007 in the West), SNK released SNK vs. Capcom: Card Fighters DS for the Nintendo DS handheld system, and unlike previous installments in this series (all released before 2003), Card Fighters DS included cards based on ADK characters on SNK's side. In 2019, Jeanne D'Arc, one of the characters from the World Heroes series, appeared as a playable DLC character in SNK Heroines: Tag Team Frenzy.

Regarding rereleases of ADK's catalog of games, its titles have also been rereleased numerous times by SNK in a variety of platforms and stores, and in different presentations (standalone or as part of different SNK compilations) since the late 2000s, including Hamster Corporation's Arcade Archives series. Notoriously, in 2008, SNK released a more dedicated compilation of five classic ADK Neo Geo titles for the PlayStation 2 titled ADK Damashii (ADK魂) (lit. "ADK Spirits"), that being the only collection using the ADK trademark and logo since the company's dissolution. The compilation includes Aggressors of Dark Kombat, Ninja Master's: Haō Ninpō Chō, Ninja Combat, Ninja Commando, and Twinkle Star Sprites. It was ported to PlayStation 4 in 2015, and localized outside Japan in 2017.

== List of products ==
The following lists ADK-developed titles by platform of earliest release. Third-party publishers are also noted.

=== Early arcade games ===
- Dorachan (1980, Craul Denshi)
- Shogi (1980, Tehkan)
- Janputer (1981, Sanritsu Giken & Taito)
- Jump Bug (1981, contracted by Hoei Sangyo, published by Sega)
- Crush Roller / Make Trax (1981, Craul Denshi)
- Talbot (1982)
- Exciting Soccer (1983)
- Champion Baseball (1983, Sega)
- Champion Baseball II (1983, Sega)
- Bull Fighter (1984)
- Equites (1984, Sega)
- Exciting Soccer II (1985)
- High Voltage (1985)
- Perfect Janputer (1985)
- The Kōkō Yakyū (lit. "The High School Baseball") (1985)
- Splendor Blast (1985)
- Super Stingray (1986, distributed by Sega)
- Kyros No Yakata / Kyros (1986)
- Time Soldiers / Battle Field (1987, SNK)
- Sky Soldiers (1988, SNK)
- Gang Wars (1989, SNK)
- Sky Adventure (1989, SNK)
- Super Champion Baseball (1989, SNK) [formally titled as Kaettekita Champion Baseball]

=== NES ===
- STED: Iseki Wakusei no Yabou (1990, K Amusement Leasing/KAC)

=== Neo Geo ===
- Magician Lord (1990, SNK)
- Ninja Combat (1990, SNK)
- Sun Shine / Block Paradise (1990, unreleased)
- Blue's Journey / Raguy (1990, SNK)
- Thrash Rally (1991, SNK, Rally Chase on NGCD)
- Crossed Swords (1991, SNK)
- Fun Fun Bros (1991, unreleased)
- Mystic Wand (1991, unreleased)
- Ninja Commando (1992, SNK)
- World Heroes (1992, assisted by and published with SNK)
- World Heroes 2 (1993, assisted by and published with SNK)
- Aggressors of Dark Kombat (1994, SNK)
- World Heroes 2 Jet (1994, SNK)
- Master of Syougi (1995, SNK)
- World Heroes Perfect (1995, SNK)
- Ninja Master's: Haō Ninpō Chō (1996, SNK)
- Over Top (1996)
- Twinkle Star Sprites (1996, SNK)
- Dance RhythMIX (2002, unreleased)

=== Neo Geo CD ===
All released Neo Geo titles were also ported to Neo Geo CD.

- Crossed Swords II (1995)
- ADK World (1995)
- ZinTrick (1996, SNK)

=== Hyper Neo Geo 64 ===
- Beast Busters: Second Nightmare (1998, SNK)

=== PlayStation ===
- Treasure Gear (1997, as Miraisoft)
- Star Monja (1998, as Miraisoft, published by GMF)

=== Neo Geo Pocket ===
- Master of Syougi (1998, SNK)
- Melon Chan no Seichō Nikki ("Melon-chan's Growth Diary") (1998, SNK)

=== Neo Geo Pocket Color ===
- Crush Roller (1999, SNK)
- Dokodemo Mahjong (1999, SNK)
- Master of Syougi Color (1999, SNK)
- Neo Poke Pro Yakyū (1999, SNK)
- Party Mail (1999, SNK)
- Dynamite Slugger (2000, SNK)
