= Ninja Combat =

1990 video game

- Developer: Alpha Denshi
- Publishers: SNK: Neo Geo CD; JP: ADK; NA: SNK
- Producer: Tsutomu Maruyama
- Designers: Hatsue Honbe; Kazushige Hakamata; Shinji Moriyama
- Programmers: Eiji Fukatsu; Hideo Kamoda; Teruaki Shirasawa
- Artists: Mitsunari Ishida; Kenichi Sakanishi
- Composers: Hideki Yamamoto; Hiroaki Shimizu
- Platforms: Arcade, Neo Geo AES, Neo Geo CD
- Release: Arcade: JP: July 24, 1990; Neo Geo AES: NA/JP: July 1, 1991; Neo Geo CD: JP: October 31, 1994; NA: October 1996
- Genre: Beat 'em up
- Modes: Single-player, multiplayer
- Arcade system: Neo Geo MVS

Ninja Combat (Note: Japanese: ニンジャコンバット, Hepburn: Ninja Konbatto) is a 1990 beat 'em up video game developed by Alpha Denshi and published by SNK for the Neo Geo arcade and home platforms.

== Gameplay ==
Gameplay screenshot

The journey takes the ninja heroes from an amusement park to the top of a tower. Along the way, they must survive endless attacks from the members of Kage Ichizoku and their minions. The protagonists Joe and Hayabusa use shuriken as their primary weapon, although other weapons that aid them along the way are nunchaku, maces, ratchets, battle axes, spiked clubs, and katana swords. A special somersault attack can be used to knock down multiple enemies in a row. As an art of ninpo kairou, a fire dragon (Joe) or lightning strike (Hayabusa) can be summoned to destroy all enemies on the screen.

The heroes die if their life force runs out or time expires. Per 1,500 points scored or they pick up a gold capsule, they earn an extra life.

There are seven levels in all.

== Plot ==
The story, set in the year "199X", follows the twin ninja warriors named Joe (ジョー) and Hayabusa (ハヤブサ, lit. "Falcon") (not to be mistaken with Joe Musashi or Ryu Hayabusa), who are waging a battle against an evil ninja clan Kage Ichizoku (影一族, lit. "Shadow Family"). Their mission is to fight their way into the enemy home fortress, the Ninja Tower (ニンジャタワー, "Ninjatawa"), which has emerged from the ocean in the center of New York City, to once and for all defeat the Shadow Family and its leader, the long thought-dead demon sorcerer Genyousai. When defeated, three of the minibosses: Musashi (ムサシ), Kagerow (カゲロウ, lit. "Mayfly") and Gembu (ゲンブ), become allies and fight alongside Joe and Hayabusa as optional player characters. If the heroes are victorious, Genyousai is destroyed and the Ninja Tower crumbles.

== Release ==
Ninja Combat was originally released in Japanese arcades on July 24, 1990. Its home version was released internationally for the Neo Geo in 1991 and for the Neo Geo CD on October 31, 1994 in Japan only. The original soundtrack for both Ninja Combat and The Super Spy, along with the arranged versions by SNK Sound Team and KONNY, was published by Pony Canyon and Scitron on November 21, 1990.

Ninja Combat was re-released through Nintendo's Virtual Console download service in Europe and Australia on October 26, 2007, and in North America on June 2, 2008. It is also one of the five games ported to the PlayStation 2 in the game compilation ADK Damashii in 2008. Hamster Corporation re-released the game as part of their ACA Neo Geo series for the PlayStation 4, Xbox One, Nintendo Switch, Windows, Android and iOS.

== Reception ==
Contemporary reviews (Neo Geo)

Review scores
Publication	Score
ACE	805/1000
Computer and Video Games	34%
Electronic Gaming Monthly	19/40
Joystick	90% 85%
Raze	84%
Superjuegos	79%
Consolemania	84%

In Japan, Game Machine listed the game on their December 15, 1990 issue as being the eighteenth most-popular arcade game at the time. It was more successful in North America, where it was an arcade hit. The RePlay arcade charts listed Ninja Combat as the second most-popular software conversion kit from November to December 1990, and then the top-grossing software conversion kit in January 1991.

The game has received mixed reception from critics since its release in arcades and other platforms. Electronic Gaming Monthly's four reviewers commended the audiovisual presentation and playable characters having their own fighting style but criticized the Neo Geo AES version for using unlimited continues, short length, easy difficulty and repetitive gameplay. Raze's Julian Boardman also shared a similar opinion, stating that the use of unlimited continues hampered both gameplay and challenge. However, ACE's Tony Dillon argued with this sentiment by claiming on his review that the unlimited continue feature was a hardware design flaw on the first batch of AES systems. Dillon praised the game's audiovisual presentation, stating that "this game is fulfilling what the Neo Geo promises - a standard arcade machine for the home" but criticized its short length.

French magazine Joystick regarded Ninja Combat as one of the best beat 'em ups on consoles and comparing it with Double Dragon and Final Fight, praising the audio and visuals as well as the sprite animations and controls highly but criticized the overall short length. Superjuegos' Alberto Pascual praised the game's ability to recruit defeated minibosses as playable characters and two-player mode but felt mixed in regards to the originality on-display. Computer and Video Games Mean Machines compared the title with Shadow Warriors, commending the audiovisual presentation but criticized the gameplay for being dull and boring to play, easy difficulty and short length. In a similar manner, Italian publication Consolemania also compared it with Shadow Warriors, praising the graphics but criticized certain aspects of both audio and playability.

=== Retrospective ===
Retrospective reviews

Aggregate score
Aggregator	Score
GameRankings	38% (3 reviews)

Review scores
Publication	Score
AllGame	(Neo Geo) 1/5
Eurogamer	(Wii) 3/10
IGN	(Wii) 3.5/10
Nintendo Life	(Wii) 4/10

Retrospectively, the Neo Geo and Wii releases hold a 38% score on the video game review aggregator GameRankings, based on three reviews. AllGame's Kyle Knight heavily criticized its overall design, unacceptable graphics, audio, controls, technical issues and cheap gameplay, stating that "Ninja Combat is a poorly conceived, poorly executed game." Eurogamer's Dan Whitehead claimed Ninja Combat to be a "rip-off" of other titles in the beat 'em up genre such as Shinobi (1987), Ninja Gaiden (1988) and Streets of Rage (1991), praising the graphics and ability to recruit additional characters but criticizing the collision detection, stiff animations, poor controls, lack of ideas and short length.

IGN's Lucas M. Thomas called it "a profoundly unappealing gameplay experience," opining that "anything potentially innovative or interesting about Ninja Combat gets totally defeated by its terribly stiff control and overly difficult programming." Nintendo Life's Damien McFerran criticized the visuals for being uninspired and character designs, while stating that its gameplay is not comparable to Streets of Rage or Final Fight.

== See also ==
- Gang Wars
- Ninja Commando
