= Yahoo Auctions =

Online auction website in Asia

Yahoo! Auctions
- Website type: Auction
- Owner: Yahoo!
- Website: US: http://auctions.yahoo.com/ Taiwan: tw.bid.yahoo.com Japan: https://www.auctions.yahoo.co.jp
- Launched: September 14, 1998; 28 years ago

Yahoo! Auctions is a service set up by the online search giant Yahoo! in 1998 to compete against eBay.

There are currently only two localizations of the service active in Taiwan and Japan; Yahoo! has discontinued the service in the United States, Canada, Singapore, Hong Kong, United Kingdom and Ireland. The US and Canada section of the site closed down on June 16, 2007. The Singapore section of the site was closed on September 22, 2008. The UK and Ireland service was closed on June 28, 2002. During the shutdown of the UK and Ireland service, Yahoo! had endorsed its main auctions rival, eBay, as their 'preferred' service. The Hong Kong service was terminated on May 31, 2020. Since Wednesday, April 6, 2022, the Japanese version of Yahoo Auctions has blocked access from the EEA and United Kingdom.

Yahoo! Auctions was preferred by some sellers for its no-fee policy — all revenue was from advertising. Singaporean users chose to shy away from eBay after the closure of Yahoo! Auctions in Singapore, citing high fees and a cluttered website.

== SOLD.com.au ==
In April 2001, Yahoo! acquired SOLD.com.au, a major competitor to eBay in Australia. SOLD.com.au was previously owned by John Fairfax Holdings' online interactive arm, F2. The site was given a new address within the yahoo.com domain. In August 2003, Yahoo! announced that the site would be shutting down and directed users to eBay.

== Yahoo! Wallet ==
Yahoo! Wallet is a lesser-known competitor to PayPal. Wallet was designed for use at Yahoo! websites such as Yahoo! Music and Yahoo! Auctions. Likewise, new Auctions sellers were required to confirm their identity by entering in their credit card number into Wallet. The service has also been discontinued outside Japan, Taiwan and Hong Kong.

Yahoo! Kantan kessai (Yahoo!かんたん決済, Yafū kantan kessai) is a similar service for paying for Japanese auctions using either bank accounts at certain Japanese banks, or a credit card issued by a Japanese bank.
