= Amusement Expo =

Annual convention on coin activated games

Amusement Expo is an annual convention featuring and showcasing vendors, developers and businesses having to do with coin activated amusements such as video arcade machines, electro-mechanical games, ticket/redemption skill and chance games, and jukeboxes. The show is held annually in March at the Las Vegas Convention Center.

== History ==
The history of the Amusement Expo can be traced back to March 1980 when Play Meter magazine founder, Ralph Lally established the industry's first spring trade show, the Amusement Operators Expo (AOE). The AOE ran for five years before merging with the Amusement Showcase International (ASI)–a spring trade show run by the American Amusement Machine Association (AAMA) in 1986. The AOE-ASI merger was renamed the American Coin Machine Exposition (ACME) and operated under this name for ten years. In 1997 the ACME was again renamed as the Amusement Showcase International (ASI)–a name that was used from 1997 to 2009. In 2009, ASI merged with a show held by the Amusement & Music Operators Association (AMOA) and become the Amusement Expo.
