= Blue's Journey =

1990 video game

- Developer: Alpha Denshi
- Publishers: SNK: Neo Geo CD; JP: ADK; NA: SNK
- Designers: Takashi Hatono; Yohko Igarashi
- Programmers: Osamu Iijima; Yuji Noguchi
- Artists: Hideyuki Yamada; Kazushige Hakamata
- Composer: Yuka Watanabe
- Platforms: Arcade, Neo Geo AES, Neo Geo CD
- Release: Arcade: WW: December 31, 1990; Neo Geo AES: WW: July 1, 1991; Neo Geo CD: JP: October 31, 1994; NA: October 1996
- Genre: Platform
- Modes: Single-player, multiplayer
- Arcade system: Neo Geo MVS

Blue's Journey (Note: Also known as Raguy (Japanese: ラギ, Hepburn: Ragi) in Japan.) is a 1990 platform video game developed by Alpha Denshi and published by SNK for the Neo Geo arcade and home platforms. It was ported to the Neo Geo CD in 1994. It was rereleased on the Wii's Virtual Console in Europe on November 9, 2007, followed by North America on November 12, 2007.

Hamster Corporation re-released the game as part of their ACA Neo Geo series for the PlayStation 4, Xbox One, Nintendo Switch, Windows, Android and iOS.

== Gameplay ==
Gameplay screenshot

Blue has the ability to stun enemies, pick them up and throw them as projectiles. He can also shrink himself down in order to access hidden areas. A second player can take control of an unnamed green palette swap of Blue.

== Plot ==
In the game the player controls a heroic young man named Blue who was sent by Princess Fa to save the peaceful planet of Raguy. The planet is inhabited by insect people (Insectarians) and Blue is in love with the Princess Fa. It has been invaded by the evil Daruma Empire, who plans on consuming the planet's resources and polluting it.

There are several endings in the game depending on certain events such as whether or not the player defeated their rival.

== Reception ==
Reception

Aggregate score
Aggregator	Score
GameRankings	(NG) 48.75% (NS) 50%

Review scores
Publication	Score
AllGame	(NG) 2/5
Eurogamer	(Wii) 5/10
GameFan	(NG) 368/400
GamePro	(NG) 24/25
GameSpot	(Wii) 3.5/10
HobbyConsolas	(NG) 92/100
IGN	(Wii) 6.0/10
Joystick	(NG) 92%
Nintendo Life	(Wii) 5/10 (NS) 5/10
Tilt	(NG) 17/20

RePlay reported Blue's Journey to be the sixth most-popular arcade game at the time. The game received generally positive reception from critics since its release in arcades and other platforms, most of which unanimously praised the colorful graphics. Both the Neo Geo and Nintendo Switch versions hold a 48.75% and 50% respectively on the review aggregator GameRankings. AllGame's Kyle Knight praised the "cutesy" and colorful graphics when compared to other systems released at the time such as the Nintendo Entertainment System and Sega Genesis, as well as the multiple pathways but ultimately regarded its gameplay as average, noting that it lacked difficulty. Consoles Plus' Pingos and Badin highly commended the presentation for being varied, simple controls and multiple paths but noted that the music was repetitive. GameFan and GamePro gave high remarks the colorful visuals, music, characters, gameplay and controls but Andrew Cockburn of the former publication noted its short length.

Hobby Consolas' Marcos García highly praised the technical presentation, colorful graphics, samba-style soundtrack, numerous secrets, bosses, gameplay and two-player co-op feature. Joypad's Alain Huyghues-Lacour and Seb, as well as Joystick Jean-Marc Demoly, noted its low difficulty level but commended the animated graphics, controls and audio. Player One's Cyril Drevet gave positive remarks to the colorful graphics, sprite animations, sound, difficulty and longevity. Tilt's Laurent Defrance and Jean-Michel Maman regarded it as a cross between Marvel Land and Sonic the Hedgehog, while Génération 4's Frank Ladoire also drew comparison with Super Mario Bros.. Both publications praised the colorful graphics, fluid animations, responsive controls and soundtrack, with both Defrance and Maman stating that Blue's Journey was an original and varied adventure-platform game. Consolemania's Marco Auletta criticized the graphics and sound for being simplistic and bland respectively, as well as its gameplay for being frustrating.

In recent years, Blue's Journey has been met with a more mixed reception from critics. Eurogamer's Dan Whitehead criticized the visuals for being "crude and blotchy", recommending Super Mario Bros. 3 on the Wii's Virtual Console instead. GameSpot's Frank Provo praised the sound design and soundtrack but criticized the graphics and gameplay. IGN's Lucas M. Thomas regarded the title as a passable platform game. In 2014, HobbyConsolas identified it as one of the twenty best games for the Neo Geo AES.
