= Iron Tank =

1988 video game

Iron Tank: The Invasion of Normandy Great Tank
- Box cover of Iron Tank: The Invasion of Normandy
- Developer: SNK
- Publisher: SNK
- Platform: NES
- Release: NA: July 1988; JP: July 29, 1988; AU: 1988
- Genre: Shooting
- Mode: Single-player

Iron Tank: The Invasion of Normandy, known as Great Tank (グレートタンク, Gurēto Tanku) in Japan, is a 1988 top-view action shooting game produced by SNK for the Nintendo Entertainment System.

== Summary ==
This video game is based on SNK's 1985 arcade game TNK III (which was released as TANK in Japan). Set in World War II during the invasion of Normandy, the player takes control of a commando named Paul and codenamed SNAKE (Colonel Ralf in the Japanese version, who also appeared in Ikari Warriors), as he mans the titular Iron Tank to infiltrate the Nazi German stronghold. Within PAL-A regions, it was only released in Australia.

== Controls ==
The tank is controlled by a standard NES controller: directional buttons control the tank's movement, "A" fires the tank's machine-gun, "B" fires the main gun, "Start" pauses the game on the main screen, and "Select" opens the in-game menu. The turret can point in the standard 8 directions and is rotated by simultaneously pressing "A" and the desired direction. The turret will maintain its direction on the screen regardless of the tank's movements or facing and using this is part of the game's strategy.

== In-game menu ==
While in the game, pressing the "Select" button will open the in-game menu. From here, the player can activate or deactivate main gun fire options, read incoming radio messages, check progress on the game map and turn on the automated "Refuel" option. There are four main gun options, which when activated, alter the main gun's properties. They are:

- V - "Rapid-Fire" - increases rate of fire. Player may hold down the A button.
- F - "Armor Pierce" - shoots "through" walls and terrain features to hit enemies beyond them. This also doubles the shot's damage.
- B - "Bomb Shells" - shots explode when they hit or reach maximum range. This also doubles the shot's damage.
- L - "Long Range" - each shot's range is doubled (to almost the full screen's distance).

== Power-ups ==
While advancing through the game, the player will also come across power-up icons – red squares with a white letter in them. Some of the benefits from these include:

- E - restores a portion of the tank's health meter.
- R - fully restores the tank's health meter and adds left-over points to the tank's "Reserve" option (accessed via the in-game menu).
- V, F, B, & L - add a portion of energy to each of their respective option meters. Each of these will also add one point to the tank's health or (if full) its "Refuel" option meter.
- ? - a superweapon that destroys everything on the screen when selected and is very rare.
- In addition to the above, running over soldiers with the tank will add one point to the tank's health meter while running over officers will add one health point and a point to the "V" option meter.

== Level path ==
Like most NES action shooters, Iron Tank is divided into multiple levels, with bosses at the end of each, but the gameplay is continuous; there are no breaks between levels as the defeat of one boss directly leads to the start of the next level. One unique aspect that separates it from other action shooters is the ability of the player choose different paths to the final level by driving down the path of his choice. Some paths have fewer but more difficult levels, resulting in a shorter game if the player can successfully negotiate them while others are the reverse. The paths break and converge at specific points in the game's progress, allowing the player to mix and match level paths as the game progresses.

== Level bosses ==
The level bosses are various different, powerful weapons that include giant tanks, railway artillery, fortresses and grounded aircraft. Most have some degree of movement either in two directions—such as the railway gun, or freely around the screen like any of the several giant tanks. All of them have predictable movement and firing patterns and exploiting this is necessary to defeat them.
