= TNK III =

1985 video game

- Arcade flyer
- Developer: SNK
- Publishers: WW: SNK; NA: Kitcorp
- Designer: Koji Obada
- Platforms: Arcade, Amstrad CPC, ZX Spectrum, Commodore 64
- Release: JP: July 1985; NA: September 1985; EU: January 1986
- Genre: Multidirectional shooter
- Modes: Single-player, multiplayer

TNK III, released outside North America as T.A.N.K (Note: Japanese: ティー・エー・エヌ・ケー, Hepburn: Tī Ē Enu Kē), is a 1985 multidirectional shooter video game developed and published by SNK for arcades. It was published in North America as TNK III by Kitcorp. Versions of T.A.N.K. for home computers were released by Ocean Software for the ZX Spectrum, Commodore 64, and Amstrad CPC in 1987. A sequel, Iron Tank, was released for the Nintendo Entertainment System in 1988.

== Gameplay ==
TNK III is a game in which the player character Ralf Jones controls a tank to destroy enemies using machine guns and cannons while maneuvering to the destination, and searching power-ups that can be retrieved along the way.

The game is controlled using a rotary joystick. It is a type of joystick-knob hybrid, with an eight-directional joystick controlling the direction of the tank's movement, while it can be turned with 360-degree rotation to point the direction of the gun turret.

== Development ==
The game was developed by SNK, where it was designed and directed by Koji Obada, who previously designed Munch Mobile (Joyful Road in Japan). At the time, SNK was on the verge of bankruptcy. According to Obata, their line of thinking was, "if we're going to go bankrupt, let's do something crazy and go out with a bang!" A programmer from SNK discovered Taito's arcade shooter Front Line (1982), and thought that SNK could go further with the gameplay format. The team improved on Front Line with the addition of a rotary joystick, or what they called a "loop lever" joystick. The team came up with the rotary joystick when, according to Obada, "our hands hurt, so someone got the idea to put a film capsule container over the joystick, which would spin around in place there".

== Reception ==
In Japan, Game Machine listed T.A.N.K. on their August 15, 1985 issue as being the sixth most-successful table arcade unit of the month.

Computer and Video Games gave the arcade version of T.A.N.K. a positive review in January 1986, with praise for the "instantly playable" and "action-packed" gameplay as well as the rotary joystick controls, but they felt the graphics were dated. Mike Roberts and Eric Doyle of Computer Gamer magazine also gave the arcade game a positive review in early 1986, praising the "novel joystick" controls and comparing the gameplay favorably with Capcom's run-and-gun shooter Commando (1985), stating it is "approaching that sort of quality".

The Commodore 64 version of the game was reviewed in 1988 in Dragon #135 by Hartley, Patricia, and Kirk Lesser in "The Role of Computers" column. The reviewers gave the game 3 out of 5 stars.

== Legacy ==
The same year, Capcom's run-and-gun shooter Commando was a major hit in arcades. Koji Obada went on to combine the run-and-gun shooter gameplay of Commando with the rotary joystick controls and tank vehicles of T.A.N.K. to develop Ikari Warriors (1986), which became a major hit in arcades.

Hamster Corporation released the game as part of their Arcade Archives series for the Nintendo Switch and PlayStation 4 in 2019.
