= Time Soldiers =

1987 video game

- Arcade flyer
- Developer: Alpha Denshi
- Publishers: JP: SNK; NA: Romstar; EU: Electrocoin
- Platforms: Arcade, Amiga, Atari ST, Commodore 64, Master System
- Release: JP/NA: October 1987; EU: January 1988
- Genre: Run and gun
- Modes: Single-player, multiplayer
- Arcade system: JAMMA+

Time Soldiers, known in Japan as Battle Field (バトル フィールド), is a 1987 run and gun video game developed by Alpha Denshi for arcades and published by SNK. It was distributed in North America by Romstar. A Master System version was also produced, as well as versions titled Time Soldier for the Amiga, Commodore 64, and Atari ST.

== Gameplay ==
A player fights enemy soldiers in the World War era. The "D-Scanner" at the top of the screen shows the location of the comrade who must be rescued.

Time Soldiers can be played by either a single-player, or by two players simultaneously. Players move their characters with an eight-way rotary joystick, shooting enemies along a scrolling backdrop. The rotary joystick allows players to walk in one of eight directions while shooting in any of twelve directions. These controls are similar to the SNK-developed Ikari Warriors (1986) which allowed the player to walk and rotate in eight directions.

The plot involves the protagonists traveling through time to rescue their comrades from the villainous Gylend. Each of the five levels is set in a different time period: The Primitive Age, The Age of Rome, The World Wars, The Age of War and Future World. Players travel between the periods with the aid of a device called the "D-Scanner". Before each level, the player is shown the name of one of their comrades and the period in which that comrade is held captive. The player is then placed into one of the time periods. If that period is not the one in which the captive soldier is located, the player must defeat a midboss of the level and re-enter the time portal, repeating the process until the correct time period is reached. When the player reaches the correct time period, the player must then fight through the end of the level and defeat the level boss to rescue the captured soldier. Unlimited continues are available on all levels except the last one. In the Sega Master System port however, continues are limited to three continues per player.

== Reception ==
In Japan, Game Machine listed Time Soldiers on their November 15, 1987 issue as being the second most-successful table arcade unit of the month. Robin Hogg of The Games Machine reviewed the arcade game, praising it for its rich graphics and difficulty curve, while comparing it favorably to Ikari Warriors. Duncan Evans of Popular Computing Weekly reviewed the Master System port, rating it 89% and considering it one of the better Master System titles, while comparing it favorably to Commando (1985) and preferring it over the Master System versions of Golvellius and Altered Beast.

== See also ==
- Sky Soldiers
- Ninja Commando
