= Front Line (video game) =

1982 video game

- North American arcade flyer
- Developer: Taito
- Publisher: Taito
- Designer: Tetsuya Sasaki
- Platform: Arcade: Atari 2600, ColecoVision, FM-7, MSX, Famicom, PC-6001, PC-8801, PC-9801, Sharp X1
- Release: November 10, 1982: Arcade; JP: November 10, 1982; WW: November 1982 ColecoVision; NA: December 1983 PC-8801; JP: 1983 X1; JP: 1983 2600; NA: March 1984 MSX; JP: 1984 FM-7; JP: 1985 Famicom; JP: August 1, 1985
- Genre: Run and gun
- Modes: Single-player, multiplayer
- Arcade system: Taito SJ System

Front Line (Note: Japanese: フロントライン, Hepburn: Furonto Rain) is a 1982 run and gun video game developed and published by Taito for arcades. It was one of the first overhead run and gun games, a precursor to many similarly-themed games of the mid-to-late 1980s. Front Line is controlled with a joystick, a single button, and a rotary dial that can be pushed in like a button. The single button is used to throw grenades and to enter and exit tanks, while the rotary dial aims and fires the player's gun.

The game was a commercial success in Japan, where it was the seventh highest-grossing arcade game of 1982. However, it received a mixed critical and commercial reception in Western markets, with praise for its originality but criticism for its difficulty. The game's overhead run and gun formula preceded Capcom's Commando (1985) by several years. The SNK shooters TNK III (1985) and Ikari Warriors (1986) follow conventions established by Front Line, including the vertically scrolling levels, entering/exiting tanks, and not dying when an occupied tank is destroyed.

== Gameplay ==
Playing as a lone soldier, the player's ultimate objective is to lob a hand grenade into the enemy's fort, first by fighting off infantry units and then battling tanks before finally reaching the opponent's compound.

The player begins with two weapons: a pistol and grenades, with no ammo limit. Once the player has advanced far enough into enemy territory, there is a "tank warfare" stage in which the player can hijack a tank to fight off other enemy tanks.

There are two types of tanks available: a light tank armed with a machine gun and a heavy tank armed with a cannon. The light tank is more nimble, but can be easily destroyed by the enemy. The heavy tank is slower, but can sustain one hit from a light tank; a second hit from a light tank will destroy it. A single shot from a heavy tank will destroy either type of tank. If a partially damaged tank is evacuated, the player can jump back in and resume its normal operation; however, with either type of tank, the player must exit the vehicle within a few seconds of being struck by a fatal shot. If the player does not exit a tank before it explodes, they lose a life. An extra life is awarded at 10,000 or 15,000, and none thereafter.

The tank battle continues until the player reaches the enemy's fort. The fort is a brick-barricaded tank which fires mortar rounds while the player attempts to take it out. In order to destroy this tank, the player must toss a grenade over the brick barricade, which can only be accomplished on foot. Once this is done, the tank will explode and an enemy soldier will wave a white flag, signalling surrender, plus 1,000 bonus points. The game repeats again with the infantry level, but enemy soldiers become increasingly quicker and deadlier in successive rounds; points are multiplied based on the level played.

== Ports ==
The first portion of the Atari 2600 version

Following its arcade coin-up release, ports of Front Line were released for the ColecoVision console and PC-8801 and Sharp X1 computers in 1983, Atari 2600 and MSX in 1984, FM-7 and Famicom in 1985. The ColecoVision version requires the Super Action Controller add-on.

== Reception ==
Reception

Review scores
Publication	Score
Computer and Video Games	Positive (Arcade)
Computer Entertainer	4/8 (ColecoVision)
Video Games	Mixed (Arcade)

Award
Publication	Award
Arcade Awards	Coin-Op Game of the Year (runner‑up)

The arcade game was a commercial success in Japan, where Game Machine listed Front Line as the seventh highest-grossing arcade video game of 1982. Game Machine later listed Front Line on their June 1, 1983 issue as being the twentieth most-successful table arcade unit of the month. In the United Kingdom, the arcade game had limited commercial success due to its initially high difficulty.

The arcade game received mixed reviews upon release, with praise for its originality but criticism for its difficulty. Following its North American debut at the Amusement & Music Operators Association (AMOA) show in November 1982, Video Games magazine published two reviews. One review said "Taito has a knack for coming up with some of the most original and offbeat games in the business" with Front Line being "an example" of this, while noting the controls are similar to Taito's earlier Western Gun (1975). The other review listed it among the top ten "Misses" of the show and stated it was a "war game with a lot of potential, but also with a firing mechanism that's so difficult to maneuver it ruins the game". Computer and Video Games stated that, despite the initial difficulty, "the action really takes off" with the tank and it's "worth persevering with" until then.

In the 1983 Arcade Awards, Front Line was a runner-up for Coin-Op Game of the Year, behind Pole Position. The award was given by Electronic Games, which stated that this "arcade approach to the dirty business of infantry combat forces the player to keep moving and firing constantly" and the "action is non-stop in this attractive shoot 'em up".

== Legacy ==
Front Line was one of the first video games with a ground combat theme and grenades, a precursor to many similarly-themed games of the mid-to-late 1980s. It was one of the earliest overhead run and gun video games, preceding Capcom's Commando (1985) by several years.

Front Line was the basis for SNK's TNK III (1985), known as T.A.N.K. in Japan and Europe. A programmer from SNK discovered Front Line at an arcade and thought that SNK could go further with the gameplay format. The team improved on Front Line with the addition of a rotary joystick. In turn, SNK went on to combine elements of T.A.N.K. with Commando (1985) to produce the arcade hit Ikari Warriors (1986). Jaleco's Field Combat (1985) also has similar gameplay to Front Line.

A Game Boy Color spin-off entitled Sgt. Rock: On the Frontline was published by Taito in 2000. The game follows the template of the original arcade game, but is set within the DC Comics universe.

The arcade original was included in Taito Memories Gekan for the PlayStation 2 console in 2005, and in Taito Legends 2 for the PlayStation 2, Xbox and Windows platforms in 2006. The Famicom version was released for the Virtual Console service in Japan for the Wii in June 2007, the Nintendo 3DS in January 2014 and the Wii U in June 2016.

The game was released by Hamster Corporation as part of their Arcade Archives series for the PlayStation 4 in January 2018 and Nintendo Switch in February 2019.

== See also ==
- Sheriff, a 1979 game by Nintendo that uses the same rotary dial controller
