= Ikari Warriors =

1986 video game

- North American arcade flyer
- Developer: SNK
- Publishers: JP: SNK; NA: Tradewest; SPA: Sega, S.A. SONIC
- Director: Koji Obada
- Designer: Koji Obada
- Programmer: Daimajin
- Artists: Tama; Keiko Iju
- Platform: Arcade: Apple II, Amiga, Atari 2600, Atari 7800, Atari ST, Amstrad CPC, Commodore 16, Commodore 64, NES, MS-DOS, MSX2, IBM PC, ZX Spectrum
- Release: February 19, 1986: Arcade; JP: February 19, 1986; NA: June 1986 NES; JP: November 26, 1986; NA: May 1987; EU: August 10, 1989 CPC; EU: November 1986 MSX; JP: 1987 IBM PC; January 1988 MS-DOS; August 1988 2600, 7800; Late 1990
- Genre: Run and gun
- Modes: Single-player, multiplayer

Ikari Warriors, known as Ikari (Note: Japanese: 怒, Hepburn: Ikari) in Japan, is a 1986 run and gun video game developed and published by SNK for arcades. It was released in North America by Tradewest. Amongst the numerous Commando clones on the market, Ikari Warriors was distinguished by its unique control style with rotary joysticks and a two-player cooperative mode. The rotary joystick controls were in turn based on SNK's earlier TNK III (1985). Ikari was originally intended to be an official licensed adaptation of the film Rambo: First Blood Part II (1985), but SNK were initially unable to acquire the rights to the film.

The game was a major commercial success in arcades. It was Japan's second highest-grossing table arcade in 1986, and London's third highest-grossing arcade game that year. It was also a major breakthrough US release for SNK, ranking among America's top five highest-grossing dedicated arcade games for two years in a row, in 1986 and 1987.

== Gameplay ==
The player takes the role of commandos named Colonel Ralf Jones (red) and Second Lieutenant Clark Still (blue), who must try to reach the village of Ikari to free a captive high-ranking officer named Colonel Cook. Enemy units attempting to kill the player include tanks, enemy soldiers and helicopters. A number of power-ups along the way help the player achieve victory.

Players must proceed from the bottom of the screen upwards, towards the village of Ikari. Trying to prevent them from reaching the village are enemy soldiers and other units. Along the way, players may commandeer enemy tanks and helicopters (NES version) to help fight their way through the enemy personnel. The tanks are immune to enemy bullets, but have a limited supply of fuel and will sustain damage when it runs out or the tank is caught in an explosion, taking the player with it unless he can exit the tank and get clear before it blows up. The helicopters have two different weapons, a spread gun and a cannon, and may fly over water.

Rotating the joystick changes the direction the character faced independent of the direction the character was moving, as controlled by pushing the joystick. This gives the player freedom to attack or walk in eight different directions. No shot is fired from directly in front of the player; the warrior uses the machine gun in his right hand, and throws grenades with his left. If a player character takes too long moving up screen, the computer starts using "call for fire". A red spot appears below him, which is tracking fire to speed up the game.

== Hardware ==
Ikari Warriors uses SNK's model LS-30 joysticks, which contain a 12-way rotary switch box. The joysticks can be rotated in addition to being pushed in eight directions. The less successful TNK III, released in 1985 and also from SNK, is the first to have used such joysticks. There are also two buttons: one for the standard gun and another for lobbing grenades.

Ikari Warriors printed circuit boards (PCBs) were manufactured in two different versions: SNK pinout and JAMMA pinout. Most SNK-pinout units were put into Ikari Warriors cabinets, while most JAMMA-pinout units were supplied as conversion kits. The SNK-pinout boards have a 22/44-pin edge connectors. The JAMMA-pinout PCBs have a 28/56-pin edge connectors. Both types consist of a stack of three boards, with interconnects.

== Development ==
The game was developed by SNK, where it was designed and directed by Koji Obada. He had previously designed SNK's TNK III (1985), known as T.A.N.K. in Japan and Europe, a vertical tank shooter inspired by Taito's Front Line (1982) that used rotary joystick controls. The same year, Capcom's vertical run-and-gun shooter Commando (1985), known as Senjō no Ōkami ("Wolf of the Battlefield") in Japan, had become a major global arcade hit. Ikari combined the run-and-gun shooter gameplay of Commando with the rotary joysticks and tank vehicles of T.A.N.K.

The game was also inspired by the action film Rambo: First Blood Part II (1985), released as Rambo: Ikari no Dasshutsu ("Rambo: The Furious Escape") in Japan. Obada had originally intended the game to be an official licensed adaptation of Rambo, but SNK were initially unable to acquire the rights to the film. This resulted in the game's title being shortened to Ikari, referencing part of the film's Japanese title. After the game made its North American debut at an arcade game expo, they got in touch with the film's star Sylvester Stallone, who was friends with SNK's president, about acquiring the rights to the film, but it was too late by that point, as the game had already become popularly known by its Japanese title Ikari among arcade players in Japan and North America, leading to the game being officially released as Ikari Warriors in North America.

== Regional differences ==
In addition to changing the names of the main characters from Ralf and Clark to Paul and Vince, the military commander the player rescues at the end of the game is named General Kawasaki in the Japanese version (named after SNK's founder Eikichi Kawasaki) and Colonel Cook in the US/Euro version (named after Tradewest's founder Leland Cook). General Kawasaki's name was unchanged in the NES version. The enemies in the game were actually Neo-Nazis, as evidenced by the presence of a swastika at the middle of the final room.

== Versions ==
ZX Spectrum conversion

Ikari Warriors was initially converted to the Apple II, Commodore 64 and IBM PC by Quicksilver Software and published by Data East USA in the US in 1986. Elite Systems acquired the licence for Europe releasing the Amstrad CPC version in late 1986. A version for the ZX Spectrum by David Perry was scheduled for November 1986 but was never released.

In 1988 Elite published a second Commodore 64 conversion (by John Twiddy, programmer of The Last Ninja), a new ZX Spectrum conversion (by David Shea, author of the Amstrad version) along with versions for the Commodore 16, Amiga and Atari ST.

SNK released their own conversion for the MSX in 1987. The NES version was developed by Micronics. Atari Corporation released conversions for the Atari 2600 and Atari 7800 in 1990 as one of the final published games for those systems during their initial eras.

Hamster Corporation released the arcade version as part of their Arcade Archives series for the Nintendo Switch and PlayStation 4 in 2019. The game was also included on the SNK 40th Anniversary Collection. The NES version was re-released on the Nintendo Classics service on September 1, 2026.

== Reception ==
Reviews (home conversions)

Review scores
Publication	Score				
Publication	Atari ST	C64	NES	PC	ZX
Crash					76%
Computer and Video Games		89%		37/40 (CPC)	84%
Dragon				4/5	
Famitsu			24/40		
Sinclair User					7/10
Your Sinclair					8/10
Atari ST User	9/10				
Computer Entertainer			4/4		
The Games Machine					84%

In Japan, Game Machine listed Ikari as the most successful table arcade cabinet of March 1986. It remained at the top of the magazine's table arcade cabinet charts through April and early May, before returning to the top in June 1986. It went on to become Japan's second highest-grossing table arcade game of 1986. In the United Kingdom, it was one of the top three highest-grossing arcade games of 1986 in London, appearing at number-three on the annual 1986 Electrocoin chart.

In North America, Ikari Warriors was the second top-grossing arcade game on the monthly Play Meter charts in July 1986. It went on to be one of the top five highest-grossing dedicated arcade games of 1986 according to AMOA, and the year's eight highest arcade video game according to RePlay. It was also among the top five dedicated arcade games of 1987.

In 1996, Next Generation listed the arcade version of Ikari Warriors as number 61 on their "Top 100 Games of All Time", lauding the innovative joysticks, play balance, and power-ups which offer an invigorating boost to the player character's capabilities without taking away the game's challenge.

=== Conversions ===
Computer and Video Games enthusiastically reviewed the "classy" Amstrad personal computer conversion, calling the graphics "simply brilliant" and the gameplay "awesomely addictive". They said that players "won't see better ... probably for quite a while" because "the Amstrad graphics are as close as dammit to the arcade machine and the playability goes off the C+VG scale".

The IBM PC version of the game received 4 out of 5 stars in Dragon.

== Legacy ==
Ikari Warriors spawned two sequels Victory Road (1986) and Ikari III: The Rescue (1989).

SNK released an Ikari Warriors clone in 1987 called Guerrilla War (known as Guevara in Japan). The game features communist fighters Che Guevara and Fidel Castro as its protagonists.

Sylvester Stallone, whose role as John Rambo had an influence on the game, owned an Ikari Warriors arcade cabinet in the 1980s. The future mixed martial arts (MMA) champion Kazushi Sakuraba (later famous for defeating the Gracie family of Brazilian jiu-jitsu fighters) was also a fan of Ikari during his high school years.

The characters Ralf and Clark once again appeared as playable characters in Metal Slug 6 and 7, as well as in The King of Fighters series. Their names were used for two minor unrelated characters in Crystalis, and they were featured as cameos in Super Smash Bros. Ultimate as background characters in the King Of Fighters Stadium stage.

== See also ==
- Front Line, a 1982 arcade game with similar gameplay, including a rotary knob and drivable tanks
- Time Soldiers, a 1987 arcade shooter with similar gameplay, released by SNK
