= Food in video games =

Food as a video game element

Food in video games refers to the representation, use, and cultural meaning of food, drink, cooking, hunger, and eating in video games and their surrounding player cultures. Food may appear as a power-up, health item, hunger resource, crafting ingredient, decorative object, narrative symbol, or central element of a cooking or restaurant-management game. Scholarship on the subject has examined food as a gameplay mechanic, a tool of worldbuilding, a form of cultural and gender representation, and a point of connection between play and everyday eating practices.

Food has appeared in video games since early arcade games, where it commonly functioned as collectible objects or visual motifs, such as bonus fruit in Pac-Man. Later games expanded the role of food into health restoration, survival systems, cooking, crafting, social simulation, and narrative design. Academic work on food in games draws on game studies, food studies, semiotics, gender studies, media studies, and research on player culture. The subject may also include the eating practices of video game players and how food is depicted in the commercial culture surrounding games.

== Overview and scholarship ==
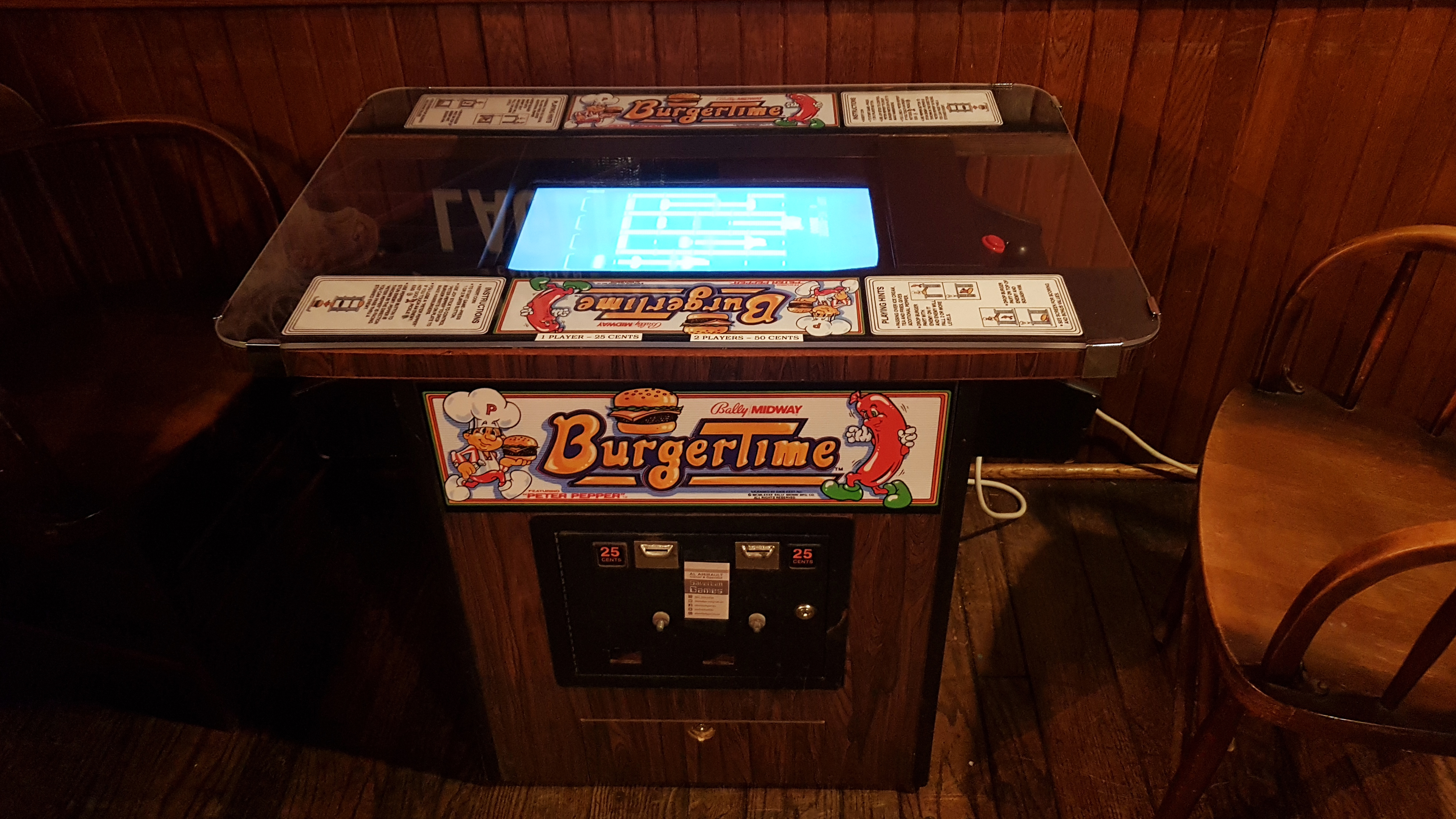
A tabletop BurgerTime arcade cabinet.

Food in video games has been studied both as an element of game systems and as a cultural sign. In Delicious Pixels: Food in Video Games, Agata Waszkiewicz argues that food in games can be understood through its functions in rules, narratives, fictional worlds, and player identity. A 2025 narrative review by Eduardo Naharro Gil and Lorenzo Mariano Juárez describes food and video games as an emerging field of social research, noting that earlier discussion often emphasized biomedical or stereotypical associations between gaming, sedentary life, and poor diet, while later work has treated food in games as a cultural, symbolic, social, and affective subject. Food-themed arcade games such as BurgerTime also made food preparation and food imagery part of early game premises and visual design.

The field includes studies of food items as mechanics, cooking games, food and domestic labour, culinary heritage, marketing, and the food practices of players at gaming events and in everyday life. Because food appears across many genres, scholars have generally treated it as a cross-genre element rather than as a single genre category.

== Gameplay functions ==
=== Restoration, sustenance, enhancement, and resources ===
Farming and grain storage in 0 A.D.. Strategy games often represent food through production and resource-management systems.

Food is frequently represented as a consumable item that affects a player character or game system. Tom Tyler's analysis of meat in video games identifies several recurring functions: food may act as sustenance, as a restorative item, as a temporary enhancement, or as a resource used for upgrades and progression. In many action, role-playing, and adventure games, food restores health or other statistics. In survival and simulation games, food may instead be tied to hunger, energy, or ongoing maintenance systems, making eating part of routine play rather than an occasional recovery action.

These functions can affect how players interpret risk and scarcity. A plentiful food item may reduce the consequences of damage, while scarce food in a survival game can make hunger, planning, and resource management central to the experience. Food can also be used to produce temporary advantages, such as increased strength, speed, resistance, or other status effects, placing it alongside potions, medicine, and other consumables in game design.

=== Cooking, crafting, and management ===
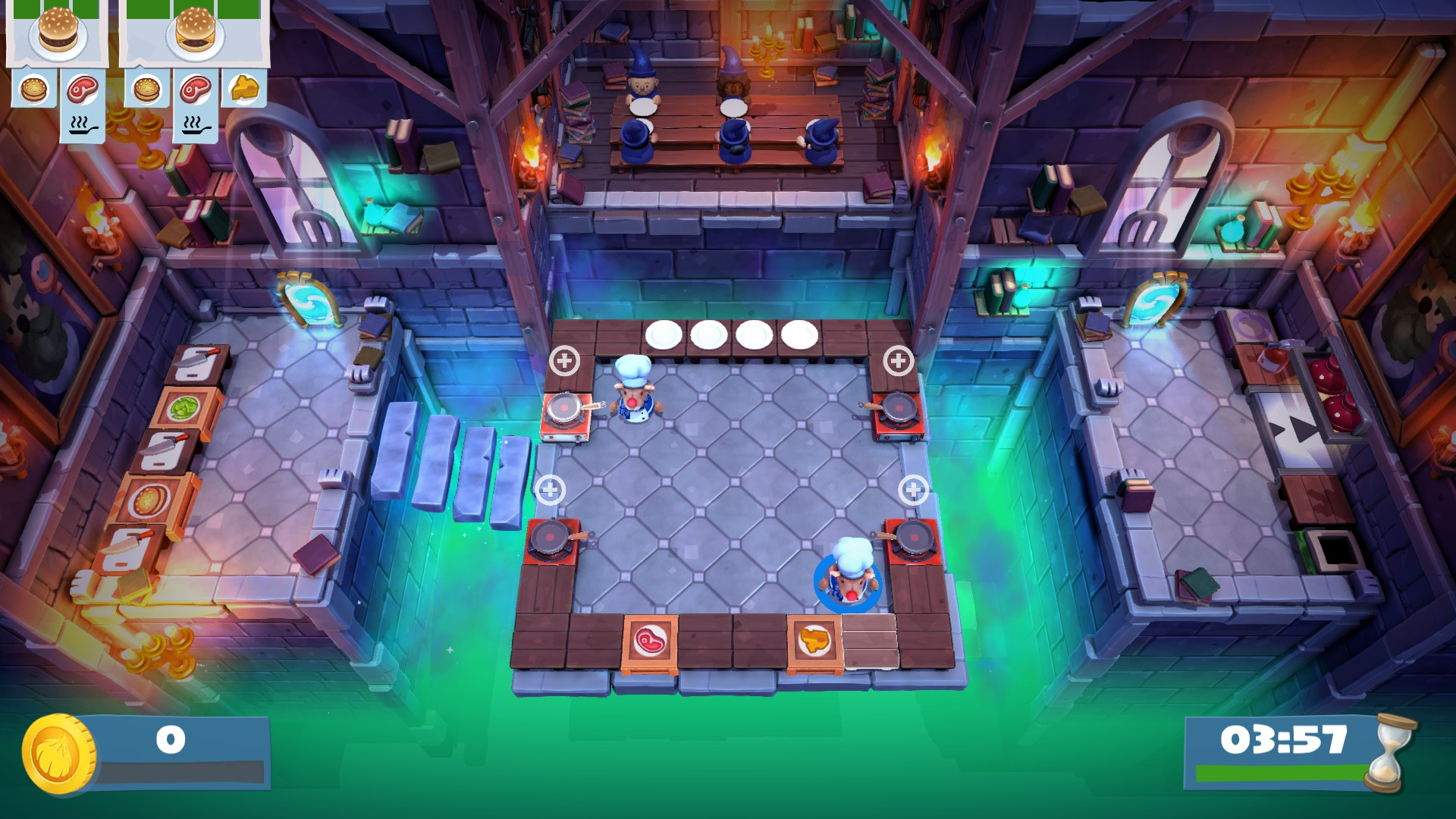
Overcooked 2 is an example of a cooking game in which food preparation and service form central gameplay mechanics.

Cooking games make food preparation or food service central to gameplay. A Springer reference entry defines cooking games as games that give players opportunities to gain, improve, or demonstrate knowledge and skills related to cooking, while also noting limitations in how many such games represent real culinary processes. Games such as Cooking Mama, Overcooked, and Cook, Serve, Delicious! use food preparation, timing, coordination, or customer service as core mechanics.

In other genres, cooking may be one part of a larger crafting system. Players may gather ingredients, combine them into recipes, and use meals for healing, survival, trade, or character development. In these contexts, food is often connected to exploration and resource collection rather than to cooking as a standalone activity.

== Narrative and worldbuilding ==
Food can communicate information about a game's fictional world, including its economy, ecology, technology, class structure, or cultural setting. Waszkiewicz describes food in games as a worldbuilding device that can connect in-game experiences with players' out-of-game identities and memories. Food may also help establish atmosphere, from abundance and comfort to scarcity, contamination, or social collapse. Contemporary open-world games may also use food scarcity to establish atmosphere and social conditions. In a study of Red Dead Redemption 2, Andrew Westerside and Jussi Holopainen note that the game's opening presents the Van der Linde gang in a blizzard where food and warmth are scarce, using scarcity to establish the group's vulnerability.

Sarah Stang's study of the Fallout series argues that the series uses food and beverages to satirize consumerism, technological optimism, and postwar American Atomic Age culture. The article analyzes both pre-packaged commercial foods and mutated wasteland foods, treating them as part of the series' critique of environmental devastation and unhealthy consumption. Similar uses of food in game narratives can mark the difference between safety and danger, domesticity and violence, or nostalgia and decay.

== Culture, identity, and representation ==
Food in video games may represent gender, domestic labour, cultural heritage, migration, and social identity. Astrid Ensslin's article on the gendered semiotics of food examines how games represent food, domesticity, and energy systems through gendered and non-gendered forms of play. Naharro Gil and Mariano Juárez identify culinary video games, domestic labour, heritage, Eurocentric bias, and food-related sociability as recurring issues in the emerging literature on food and games.

Some narrative games use cooking to represent memory, family, and migration. For example, coverage of Venba described its cooking puzzles and recipe restoration as a way of exploring generational memory and the experience of a Tamil immigrant family in Canada. In such games, food is not only a mechanic but also a narrative object that can carry emotional, cultural, and familial meaning.

== Player culture and eating practices ==
Research on food and video games also examines food consumed by players during play, at gaming events, and in gaming communities. Earlier stereotypes often associated gaming with fast food, snacks, and energy drinks, but later studies have argued that this picture is incomplete. A study by Tapani Joelsson, Henna Syrjälä, Harri Luomala, and Tuomas Mäkilä describes the common image of the "junk food gamer" as one-sided and argues that gamers' eating practices are more varied than the stereotype suggests.

Kristian Haulund Jensen and Thomas A. M. Skelly's qualitative study of young Danish adults examines how gaming and food practices compete for time and attention in everyday life. The authors argue that the relationship between eating and gaming is shaped by sociability, health commitments, and gendered expectations around domestic labour. Food at game events has also been studied as a social practice, with research on conventions, tournaments, and other gatherings arguing that eating and drinking together can help structure gaming rituals and community interaction.

== Marketing and paratexts ==
Food and drink also appear in the commercial culture surrounding games. Research on "gamer foods" has examined how marketers associate particular snacks and drinks with gaming identity, convenience, performance, and lifestyle. Francisco Javier Lopez Frias has discussed the ethics of marketing energy drinks to gamers, comparing such marketing with broader concerns about products high in sugar, salt, or fat.

These studies distinguish food in games from food around games. In the first case, food is part of the game's rules, fiction, or interface; in the second, food is part of player practice, marketing, event culture, or fan identity.

== Educational and health-related uses ==
Food-related video games and serious games have also been studied as tools for food and nutrition education. A 2024 systematic review of serious games for food and nutrition education found that such games have been used to support knowledge and learning outcomes, but also noted limitations including small sample sizes, short study durations, and lack of methodological standardization. This research treats games not only as entertainment media but also as possible tools for teaching food choice, cooking, nutrition, and health-related decision-making.

== See also ==
- Food studies
- Game studies
- Health (game terminology)
- Survival game
