= Ozma Wars =

1979 video game

- Arcade flyer
- Developer: Shin Nihon Kikaku
- Publisher: Shin Nihon Kikaku
- Platform: Arcade
- Release: JP: December 1979
- Genre: Fixed shooter
- Modes: Single-player, multiplayer

Ozma Wars (オズマ・ウオーズ, Ozuma Uōzu) is a 1979 fixed shooter video game developed and published by Shin Nihon Kikaku (SNK) for arcades. The moving starfield background gives the impression of vertical scrolling, but the player ship's movement is restricted to the bottom of the screen.

== Gameplay ==
Four enemy ships (top) attacking the player (bottom center)

The player controls a spacecraft which must fend off UFOs, meteors, and comets. Instead of lives, the player is given an energy reserve that is constantly diminishing; getting hit by the enemy causes gameplay to stop momentarily and a large amount of energy is depleted. Every so often, a mothership will appear and dock with the player's spacecraft, allowing the energy to be refilled. There are 3–4 recognizable stages as the game progresses and new enemies begin to appear. After these, the mothership will appear, and the cycle starts over; this continues indefinitely until the energy reaches zero.

Due to the game being monochrome and a conversion kit for Space Invaders, many Ozma Wars monitors used the Space Invaders color overlay.

== Legacy ==
There are two bootleg versions of this game called Space Phantoms and Solar Flight. In Space Phantoms the player's ship looks like an angel, and the enemies appear as different types of insects.
