= Shoot 'em up =

Subgenre of action game

Shoot 'em ups (also known as shmups or, chiefly in Japan, STGs) are a subgenre of action games. There is no consensus as to which design elements compose a shoot 'em up; some restrict the definition to games featuring spacecraft and certain types of character movement, while others allow a broader definition including characters on foot and a variety of perspectives.

The genre's roots can be traced back to earlier shooting games, including target shooting electro-mechanical games of the mid-20th-century, but did not receive a video game release until Spacewar! (1962). The shoot 'em up genre was established by the hit arcade game Space Invaders, which popularised and set the general template for the genre in 1978, and has spawned many clones. The genre was then further developed by arcade hits such as Asteroids and Galaxian in 1979. Shoot 'em ups were popular throughout the 1980s to early 1990s, diversifying into a variety of subgenres such as scrolling shooters, run and gun games and rail shooters. In the mid-1990s, shoot 'em ups became a niche genre based on design conventions established in the 1980s, and increasingly catered to specialist enthusiasts, particularly in Japan. "Bullet hell" games are a subgenre of shooters that features overwhelming numbers of enemy projectiles, often in visually impressive formations.

== Definition ==
A "shoot 'em up", also known as a "shmup" or "STG" (the common Japanese abbreviation for "shooting games"), is a game in which the protagonist combats a large number of enemies by shooting at them while dodging their fire. The controlling player must rely primarily on reaction times to succeed. Beyond this, critics differ on exactly which design elements constitute a shoot 'em up. Some restrict the genre to games featuring some kind of craft, using fixed or scrolling movement. Others widen the scope to include games featuring such protagonists as robots or humans on foot, as well as including games featuring "on-rails" (or "into the screen") and "run and gun" movement. Mark Wolf restricts the definition to games featuring multiple antagonists ("'em" being short for "them"), calling games featuring one-on-one shooting "combat games". Formerly, critics described any game where the primary design element was shooting as a "shoot 'em up", but later shoot 'em ups became a specific, inward-looking genre based on design conventions established in those shooting games of the 1980s.

=== Common elements ===
Shoot 'em ups are a subgenre of action games. These games are usually viewed from a top-down or side-view perspective, and players must use ranged weapons to take action at a distance. The player's avatar is typically a vehicle or spacecraft under constant attack. Thus, the player's goal is to shoot as quickly as possible at anything that moves or threatens them to reach the end of the level, usually with a boss battle. In some games, the player's character can withstand some damage or a single hit will result in their destruction. The main skills required in shoot 'em ups are fast reactions and memorising enemy attack patterns. Some games feature overwhelming numbers of enemy projectiles and the player has to memorise their patterns to survive. These games belong to one of the fastest-paced video game genres.

Large numbers of enemy characters programmed to behave in an easily predictable manner are typically featured. These enemies may behave in a certain way dependent on their type, or attack in formations that the player can learn to predict. The basic gameplay tends to be straightforward with many varieties of weapons. Shoot 'em ups rarely have realistic physics. Characters can instantly change direction with no inertia, and projectiles move in a straight line at constant speeds. Lasers and other energy beams may make right-angle turns or may "track" the movement of the ship that fired them. The player's character can collect "power-ups" which may afford the character's greater protection, an "extra life", health, shield, or upgraded weaponry. Different weapons are often suited to different enemies, but these games seldom keep track of ammunition. As such, players tend to fire indiscriminately, and their weapons only damage legitimate targets.

== Types ==
Shoot 'em ups are categorized by their design elements, particularly viewpoint and movement:

Fixed shooters restrict the player and enemies to a single screen, and the player primarily moves along a single axis, such as back and forth along the bottom of the screen. Examples include Space Invaders (1978), Galaxian (1979), Phoenix (1980), and Galaga (1981). In Pooyan (1982), the fixed axis of movement is vertical, along the right side of the screen. In Centipede (1981) and Gorf (1981), the player primarily moves left and right along the bottom, but several inches of vertical motion are also allowed within an invisible box.

Multidirectional shooters allow 360-degree movement where the protagonist may rotate and move in any direction such as Asteroids (1979) and Mad Planets (1983). Multidirectional shooters with one joystick for movement and one joystick for firing in any direction independent of movement are called twin-stick shooters. One of the first games to popularize twin-stick controls was Robotron: 2084 (1982).

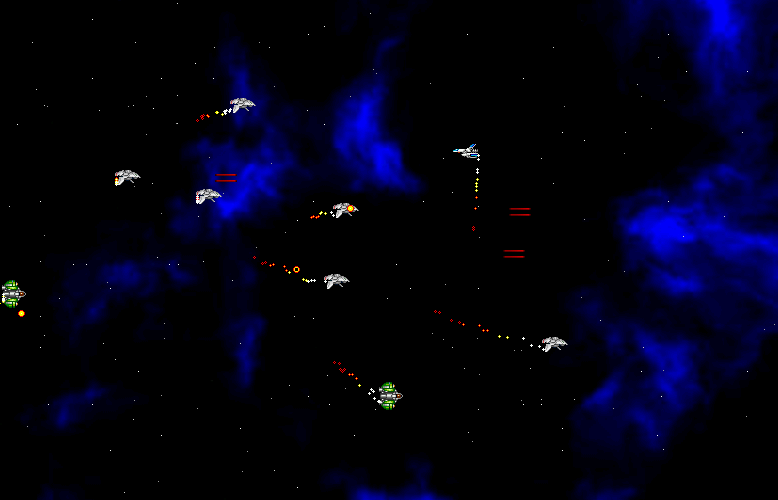
Project Starfighter, a side-view space shooter

Space shooters are a thematic variant of involving spacecraft in outer space. Following the success of Space Invaders, space shooters were the dominant subgenre during the late 1970s to early 1980s. These games can overlap with other subgenres as well as space combat games.

Tube shooters feature craft flying through an abstract tube, such as Tempest (1981) and Gyruss (1983). There is still a single axis of motion, making these a subset of fixed shooters.

Rail shooters limit the player to moving around the screen while following a specific route; these games often feature an "into the screen" viewpoint, with which the action is seen from behind the player character, and moves "into the screen", while the player retains control over dodging. Examples include Space Harrier (1985), Captain Skyhawk (1990), Starblade (1991), Star Fox (1993), Star Wars: Rebel Assault (1993), Panzer Dragoon (1995), and Sin and Punishment (2000). Rail shooters that use light guns are called light gun shooters, such as Operation Wolf (1987), Lethal Enforcers (1992), Virtua Cop (1994), Point Blank (1994), Time Crisis (1995), The House of the Dead (1997) and Elemental Gearbolt (1997). Light-gun games that are "on rails" are usually not considered to be in the shoot-em-up category, but rather their own first-person light-gun shooter category.

Cute 'em ups feature brightly colored graphics depicting surreal settings and enemies. Cute 'em ups tend to have unusual, oftentimes completely bizarre opponents for the player to fight, with Twinbee and Fantasy Zone first pioneering the subgenre, along with Parodius, Cotton, and Harmful Park being additional key games. Some cute 'em ups may employ overtly sexual characters and innuendo.

=== Scrolling shooters ===
Vertically scrolling shooters present the action from above and scroll up (or occasionally down) the screen.

Horizontally scrolling shooters usually present a side-on view and scroll left to right (or less often, right to left).

Isometrically scrolling shooters or isometric shooters, such as Sega's Zaxxon (1981), use an isometric point of view.

A popular implementation style of scrolling shooters has the player's flying vehicle moving forward, at a fixed rate, through an environment. Examples are Scramble (1981), Xevious (1983), Gradius (1985), Darius (1987), R-Type (1987), Einhänder (1997). In contrast, Defender (1981) allows the player to move left or right at will.

Blast 'em up is a term used in shmup community to describe subgenre of straightforward shooters that don't include advanced scoring mechanics. Players gain score points simply by shooting enemies and collecting score items, the ultimate goal of these games is to clear them on one credit. By default this shmup subgenre is represented by older, classic titles like Gradius, R-Type, Darius, Raiden which were the dominant style of shmups before popularization of the bullet hell subgenre.

Caravan shmup is a shooter built around score attack and time attack type of gameplay. Typically caravan shmup is played for high score in a set short amount of time, that usually lasts from 2 to 5 minutes. This type of gameplay originated from Hudson Soft's Star Soldier series and was adopted by companies like Compile and Naxat Soft. It became staple for PC Engine shmups to include caravan mode as extra alongside regular game mode. The term "caravan" comes from Hudson's National STG Caravan tournaments that were organized in Japan from 1985 to 1994 and popularized this type of gameplay. Aligning with these events yearly iterations of Summer Carnival series were released on PC Engine which were official competition titles.

Euroshmup is a semi-derogatory term that describes game design philosophy which was typical for Western made shmups (usually European) in the 80s and 90s. These design principles are seen by hardcore shmup fans as flawed and janky. This comes from the fact that at the time in Europe shmups were released on home computers like Amiga, Atari ST, and PC (hence a name of this subgenre) instead of arcades so they didn't follow the arcade game design like Japanese titles. Some defining characteristics of Euroshmup include: usual game's horizontal orientation, lifebars, underpowered weapons, player's movement featuring inertia, shops and ship upgrade systems, simple level designs and lack of balance. Euroshmups are also seen as less challenging than their Japanese counterparts. Examples of this subgenre include Tyrian, Raptor: Call of the Shadows, Jets'n'Guns.

Run and gun games have protagonists that move through the world on foot and shoot attackers. Examples include the vertically scrolling, overhead view games Front Line (1982), Commando (1985), and Ikari Warriors (1986). Side-scrolling run and gun games often combine elements from platform games, such as the ability to jump: Contra (1987), Gunstar Heroes (1993), Metal Slug (1996) and Cuphead (2017). Run and gun games may also use isometric viewpoints and may have multidirectional movement.

=== Bullet hell ===
Mushihimesama (2004), a bullet hell game

Bullet hell (弾幕, danmaku; literally "barrage" or "bullet curtain") is a subgenre of shooters in which the screen becomes crowded with complex "curtain fire" enemy patterns. It is also characterized by collision boxes that are smaller than the sprites themselves, to accommodate maneuvering through these crowded firing patterns. This style of game, also known as "manic shooters" or "maniac shooters", originated in the mid-1990s as an offshoot of scrolling shooters. The DonPachi and Touhou Project series are early titles establishing the principle of bullet hells.

A bullet heaven or reverse bullet hell is a subgenre characterized by the player character collecting or unlocking abilities and attacks whose visuals overlap and clutter the game screen as the game progresses. They also share a feature of many enemy characters, commonly called "hordes", walking toward the player from off-screen. This genre is generally attributed to Vampire Survivors, released in 2022.

=== Trance shooters ===
A small subgenre of shooter games that emphasizes chaotic, reflex-based gameplay designed to put the player in a trance-like state. In trance shooters, enemy patterns usually have randomized elements, forcing the player to rely on reflexes rather than pattern memorization. Games of this type usually feature colorful, abstract visuals, and electronic music (often techno music). Jeff Minter is commonly credited with originating the style with Tempest 2000 (1994) and subsequent games including Space Giraffe, Gridrunner++, and Polybius (2017). Other examples include the Geometry Wars series, Space Invaders Extreme, Super Stardust HD, and Resogun.

== History ==
=== Origins ===
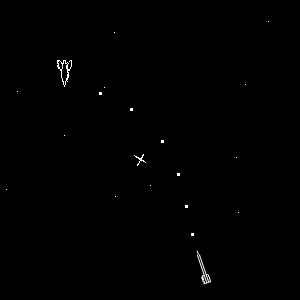
Spacewar! (1962), an early mainframe game with shooting and spacecraft

The concept of shooting games existed before video games, dating back to shooting gallery carnival games in the late 19th century and target sports such as archery, bowling and darts. Mechanical target shooting games first appeared in England's amusement arcades around the turn of the 20th century, before appearing in America by the 1920s. Shooting gallery games eventually evolved into more sophisticated target shooting electro-mechanical games (EM games) such as Sega's influential Periscope (1965). Shooting video games have roots in EM shooting games.

Video game journalist Brian Ashcraft argues the early mainframe game Spacewar! (1962) was the first shoot 'em up video game. It was developed at the Massachusetts Institute of Technology in 1961, for the developers' amusement, and presents a space battle between two craft. It was remade four times as an arcade video game in the 1970s.

=== Emergence of shoot 'em up genre (late 1970s) ===
Space Invaders (1978) is most frequently cited as the "first" or "original" in the genre. A seminal game created by Tomohiro Nishikado of Japan's Taito, it led to proliferation of shooter games. It pitted the player against multiple enemies descending from the top of the screen at a constantly increasing speed. Nishikado conceived the game by combining elements of Breakout (1976) with those of earlier target shooting games, and simple alien creatures inspired by H. G. Wells' The War of the Worlds. The hardware was unable to render the movement of aircraft, so the game was set in space, with a black background. It had a more interactive style of play than earlier target shooting games, with multiple enemies who responded to the player-controlled cannon's movement and fired back at the player. The game ended when the player was killed by the enemies. While earlier shooting games allowed the player to shoot at targets, Space Invaders was the first where multiple enemies fired back at the player. It also introduced the idea of giving the player multiple lives and popularized the concept of achieving a high score.

With these elements, Space Invaders set the general template for the shoot 'em up genre. It became one of the most widely cloned shooting games, spawning more than 100 imitators with only the most minor differences (if any) from the original. Most shooting games released since then have followed its "multiple life, progressively difficult level" paradigm, according to Eugene Jarvis.

=== Golden age and refinement (late 1970s to early 1980s) ===
Following the success of Space Invaders, shoot 'em ups became the dominant genre for much of the golden age of arcade video games, from the late 1970s up until the early 1980s, particularly the "space shooter" subgenre. In 1979, Namco's Galaxian—"the granddaddy of all top-down shooters", according to IGN—was released. Its use of colour graphics and individualised antagonists were considered "strong evolutionary concepts" among space ship games. In 1981 Gorf brought joystick control and (limited) vertical as well as horizontal movement to the vertically-oriented fixed-shooter genre, while Space Invaders and Galaxian have only horizontal movement controlled by a pair of buttons. Atari's Asteroids (1979) was a hit multi-directional shooter, taking from Spacewar! the ability for the player's ship to roam the entire screen and to rotate, move and shoot in any direction.

The Space Invaders format evolved into the vertical scrolling shooter sub-genre. SNK's debut shoot 'em up Ozma Wars (1979) featured vertical scrolling backgrounds and enemies, and it was the first action game to feature a supply of energy, similar to hit points. Namco's Xevious, released in 1982, was one of the first and most influential vertical scrolling shooters. Xevious is also the first to convincingly portray dithered/shaded organic landscapes as opposed to blocks-in-space or wireframe obstacles.

Side-scrolling shoot 'em ups emerged in the early 1980s. Defender, released by Williams Electronics in 1981, allowed side-scrolling in both directions in a wrap-around game world, unlike most later games in the genre. The scrolling helped remove design limitations associated with the screen, and it also featured a minimap radar. Scramble, released by Konami in early 1981, had continuous scrolling in a single direction and was the first side-scrolling shooter with multiple distinct levels.

In the early 1980s, Japanese arcade developers began moving away from space shooters towards character action games, whereas American arcade developers continued to focus on space shooters during the early 1980s, up until the end of the arcade golden age. According to Eugene Jarvis, American developers were greatly influenced by Japanese space shooters but took the genre in a different direction from the "more deterministic, scripted, pattern-type" gameplay of Japanese games, towards a more "programmer-centric design culture, emphasizing algorithmic generation of backgrounds and enemy dispatch" and "an emphasis on random-event generation, particle-effect explosions and physics" as seen in arcade games such as his own Defender and Robotron: 2084 (1982) as well as Atari's Asteroids (1979). Robotron: 2084 was an influential game in the multi-directional shooter subgenre.

Some games experimented with pseudo-3D perspectives at the time. Nintendo's attempt at the genre, Radar Scope (1980), borrowed heavily from Space Invaders and Galaxian, but added a three-dimensional third-person perspective; the game was a commercial failure, however. Atari's Tempest (1981) was one of the earliest tube shooters and a more successful attempt to incorporate a 3D perspective into shooter games; Tempest went on to influence several later rail shooters. Sega's Zaxxon (1981) introduced isometric video game graphics to the genre.

The term "shmup" is believed to have been coined in 1985 by the British Commodore 64 magazine Zzap!64. In the July 1985 issue, the term was used by the editor Chris Anderson and reviewer Julian Rignall.

1985 saw the release of Konami's Gradius, which gave the player greater control over the choice of weaponry, thus introducing another element of strategy. The game also introduced the need for the player to memorise levels to achieve any measure of success. Gradius, with its iconic protagonist, defined the side-scrolling shoot 'em up and spawned a series spanning several sequels. The following year saw the emergence of one of Sega's forefront series with its game Fantasy Zone. The game received acclaim for its surreal graphics and setting and the protagonist, Opa-Opa, was for a time considered Sega's mascot. The game borrowed Defender's device of allowing the player to control the direction of flight and along with the earlier TwinBee (1985), is an early archetype of the "cute 'em up" subgenre. In 1986, Taito released KiKi KaiKai, an overhead multidirectional shooter notable for using a traditional fantasy setting in contrast to most shoot 'em up games with science fiction motifs. R-Type, an acclaimed side-scrolling shoot 'em up, was released in 1987 by Irem, employing slower paced scrolling than usual, with difficult, claustrophobic levels calling for methodical strategies. 1990's Raiden was the beginning of another acclaimed and enduring series to emerge from this period.

=== Run and gun and rail shooters (1980s to early 1990s) ===
Run and gun games became popular in the mid-1980s. These games feature characters on foot, rather than spacecraft, and often have military themes. The origins of this type of shooter go back to Sheriff by Nintendo, released in 1979. Dracula Hunter (1979) by Teknon Kogyo (Tecmo) is a horror-themed shooter that involves the player running around and shooting a horde of vampires and bats to defend a princess. SNK's Sasuke vs. Commander (1980), which had relatively detailed background graphics for its time, pit a samurai against a horde of ninjas, along with boss fights.

Taito's Front Line (1982) introduced the vertical scrolling format later popularized by Capcom's Commando (1985), which established the standard formula used by later run and gun games. Sega's Ninja Princess (1985), which released slightly before Commando, was a run and gun game that was distinctive for its feudal Japan setting and female ninja protagonist who throws shuriken and knives. SNK's TNK III, released later in 1985, combined the Front Line tank shooter format with unique rotary joystick controls, which they later combined with Commando-inspired run and gun gameplay to develop Ikari Warriors (1986), which further popularized run and gun shooters. Ikari Warriors also drew inspiration from the action film Rambo: First Blood Part II (1985), which it was originally intended to be an adaptation of. Contemporary critics considered military themes and protagonists similar to Rambo or Schwarzenegger prerequisites for a shoot 'em up, as opposed to an action-adventure game. The success of Commando and Ikari Warriors led to run and gun games becoming the dominant style of shoot 'em up during the late 1980s to early 1990s, with the term "shoot 'em up" itself becoming synonymous with "run and gun" during this period.

Konami's Green Beret (1985), known as Rush'n Attack in North America, adapted the Commando formula to a side-scrolling format. Later notable side-scrolling run and gun shooters include Namco's Rolling Thunder (1986), which added cover mechanics to the formula, and Data East's RoboCop (1988). In 1987, Konami created Contra, a side-scrolling coin-op arcade game, and later a NES game, that was particularly acclaimed for its multi-directional aiming and two-player cooperative gameplay. By the early 1990s and the popularity of 16-bit consoles, the scrolling shooter genre was overcrowded, with developers struggling to make their games stand out, with exceptions such as the inventive Gunstar Heroes (1993) by Treasure.

Sega's pseudo-3D rail shooter Buck Rogers: Planet of Zoom demonstrated the potential of 3D shoot 'em up gameplay in 1982. Sega's Space Harrier, a rail shooter released in 1985, broke new ground graphically and its wide variety of settings across multiple levels gave players more to aim for than high scores. In 1986, Arsys Software released Wibarm, a shooter that switched between a 2D side-scrolling view in outdoor areas to a fully 3D polygonal third-person perspective inside buildings, while bosses were fought in an arena-style 2D battle, with the game featuring a variety of weapons and equipment. In 1987, Square's 3-D WorldRunner was an early stereoscopic 3-D shooter played from a third-person perspective, followed later that year by its sequel JJ, and the following year by Space Harrier 3-D which used the SegaScope 3-D shutter glasses. That same year, Sega's Thunder Blade switched between both a top-down view and a third-person view, and featured the use of force feedback, where the joystick vibrates.

=== Bullet hell and niche appeal (mid-1990s to present) ===
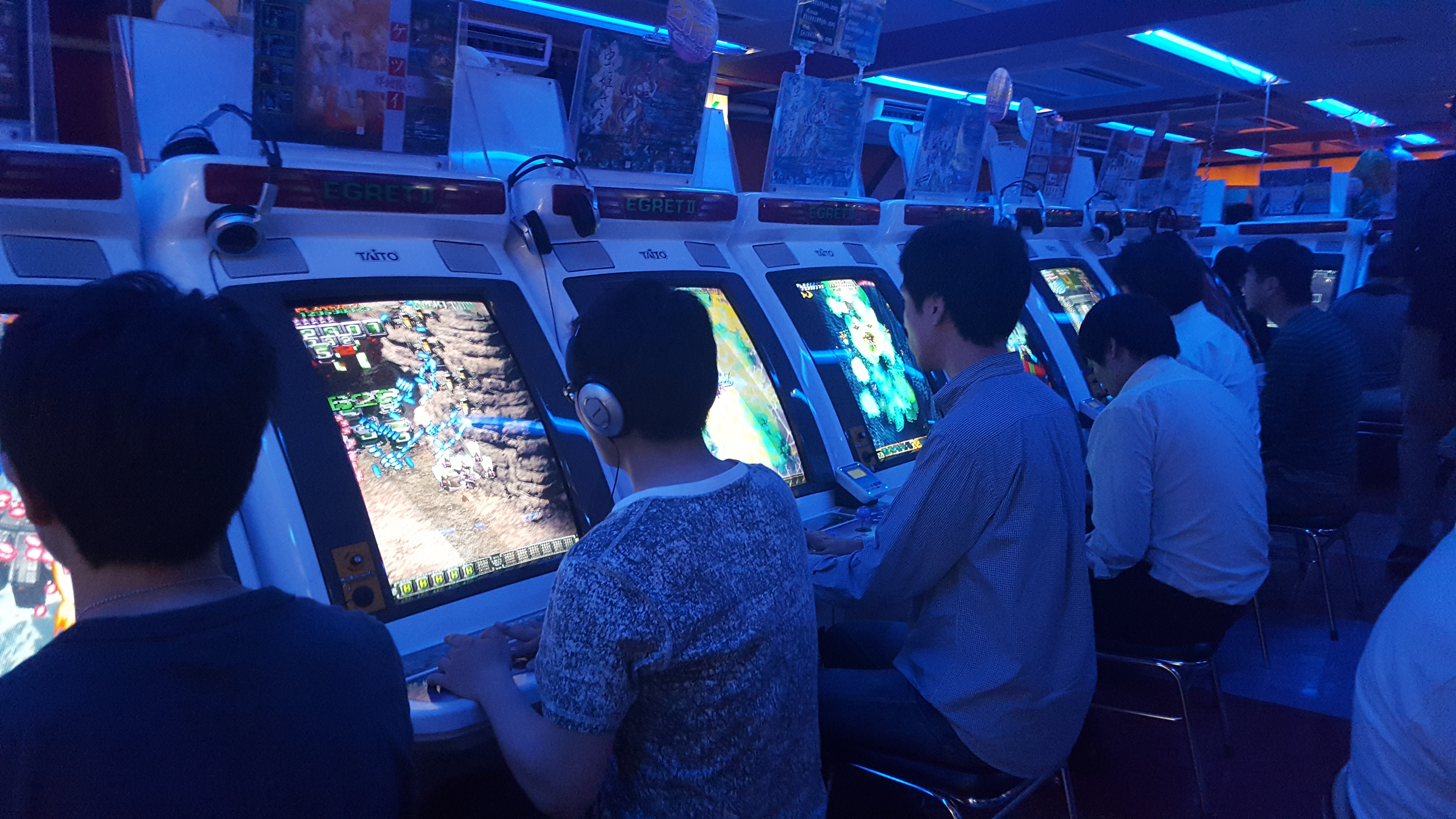
Japanese players at a shoot 'em up arcade in Akihabara, Tokyo (2017)

Over the course of the 1990s, a new subgenre of shooters evolved, known as "danmaku (弾幕; "barrage") in Japan, and often referred to as "bullet hell" or "manic shooters" in English-speaking regions. These games are characterized by high numbers of enemy projectiles, often in complex "curtain fire" patterns, as well as collision boxes that are smaller than the sprites themselves, allowing the player to fit between the narrow gaps in enemy fire.

Bullet hell games were first popularized in Japanese arcades during a time when 3D games and fighting games were eclipsing other games. The flashy firing patterns were intended to grab players attention. Toaplan's Batsugun (1993) is often considered a pivotal point in the development of this subgenre. After the closure of Toaplan, the following year, a number of studios formed from former Toaplan staff that would continue to develop this style, including Cave (formed by Batsugun's main creator Tsuneki Ikeda) who released 1995's seminal DonPachi, and Takumi, who would develop the GigaWing series. Bullet hell games marked another point where the shooter genre began to cater to more dedicated players. Games such as Gradius had been more difficult than Space Invaders or Xevious, but bullet hell games were yet more inward-looking and aimed at dedicated fans of the genre looking for greater challenges. While shooter games featuring protagonists on foot largely moved to 3D-based genres, popular, long-running series such as Contra and Metal Slug continued to receive new sequels. Rail shooters have rarely been released in the new millennium, with only Rez and Panzer Dragoon Orta achieving cult recognition. In the early 2000s, the genre achieved recognition through the mobile game Space Impact, which is considered one of the important games in the history of mobile games.

Treasure's shoot 'em up, Radiant Silvergun (1998), introduced an element of narrative to the genre. It was critically acclaimed for its refined design, though it was not released outside Japan and remains a much sought-after collector's item. Its successor Ikaruga (2001) featured improved graphics and was again acclaimed as one of the best games in the genre. Both Radiant Silvergun and Ikaruga were later released on Xbox Live Arcade. The Touhou Project series spans 28 years and 32 games as of 2024 and was listed in the Guinness World Records in October 2010 for being the "most prolific fan-made shooter series". The genre has undergone something of a resurgence with the release of the Xbox 360, PlayStation 3 and Wii online services, while in Japan arcade shoot 'em ups retain a deep-rooted niche popularity. Geometry Wars: Retro Evolved was released on Xbox Live Arcade in 2005 and in particular stood out from the various re-releases and casual games available on the service. The PC has also seen its share of dōjin shoot 'em ups like Crimzon Clover, Jamestown: Legend of the Lost Colony, Xenoslaive Overdrive, and the eXceed series. However, despite the genre's continued appeal to an enthusiastic niche of players, shoot 'em up developers are increasingly embattled financially by the power of home consoles and their attendant genres.

== See also ==
- Beat 'em up
- Space flight simulation game
- Shooter game
