= Power-up =

Video game element

In video games, a power-up is an object that adds temporary benefits or extra abilities to the player character as a game mechanic. This is in contrast to an item, which may or may not have a permanent benefit that can be used at any time chosen by the player. Although often collected directly through touch, power-ups can sometimes only be gained by collecting several related items, such as the floating letters of the word 'EXTEND' in Bubble Bobble. Well-known examples of power-ups that have entered popular culture include the power capsules from Pac-Man (regarded as the first power-up) and the Super Mushroom from Super Mario Bros., which ranked first in UGO Networks' Top 11 Video Game Powerups.

Items that confer power-ups are usually pre-placed in the game world, spawned randomly, dropped by beaten enemies or picked up from opened or smashed containers. They can be differentiated from items in other games, such as role-playing video games, by the fact that they take effect immediately, feature designs that do not necessarily fit into the game world (often used letters or symbols emblazoned on a design), and are found in specific genres of games. Power-ups are mostly found in action-oriented games such as maze games, run and guns, shoot 'em ups, first-person shooters, and platform games.

== History ==
=== Origin ===
The term "power-up" is an example of wasei-eigo (Japanese pseudo-Anglicisms); the sense was coined in Japanese as a compound of "power" (パワー, pawā; noun) and "up" (アップする, appusuru; verb), literally "to up someone's or something's power or abilities". The general meaning of X-up in Japanese is "this will increase your X", and this construction is regularly used in areas such as advertising.

=== First instances ===
The Super Mushroom is an idealized representation of the Amanita muscaria fungus.

A cutscene in Pac-Man comically exaggerates the effects of the power pellet.

Pac-Man from 1980 is credited as the first video game to feature a power-up mechanic, though at the time they were called "power capsules" by the manufacturers. Every maze in the game contains four Power Pellets which temporarily give Pac-Man the ability to eat ghosts, turning the tables on his pursuers. The effect of the power-up was illustrated by one of the first cut scenes to appear in a video game, in the form of brief comical interludes about Pac-Man and Blinky chasing each other around.

In 1984, Sabre Wulf introduced power-ups in the form of flowers which, when blossoming, provided effects such as speed up and invincibility.

In 1985, Super Mario Bros. introduced the Super Mushroom, which has entered popular culture, being described as "the quintessential power-up". The original game idea was to have an always big Mario as a technical advance, but later the power-up was introduced to make him "super" as a bonus effect. The development team thought it would be interesting to have Mario grow and shrink by eating a magic mushroom, just like in Alice's Adventures in Wonderland. Other power-ups introduced in this game were the Super Stars and Fire Flowers, which gave Mario invincibility and the ability to shoot fireballs at enemies, respectively.

Konami's 1985 game Gradius had the first use of a selection bar where the player could select which power-up effect to trigger, instead of having a fixed instant effect.

In 1986 and the years after, the concept of permanent power-ups appeared in the action role-playing genre in the form of perks.

== Types ==
Power-ups can be classified according to the type of benefit they give the player.

=== Offensive ===
Power-ups can give players a new weapon, or transform the player character into a more aggressive form that increases its attack power or makes some enemies vulnerable. This also includes "nukes", which are weapons that destroy every enemy on the screen at once; these are prevalent in many different genres including vehicular combat, run and guns, and platform games. The effect of the power-up can be time-limited, have a limited number of uses, last until the player is hit, last until the player is killed, or last until game over.

- Mega Man series: Weapons are earned from the Robot Masters/Mavericks upon defeating them. The weapons are kept until the game is turned off (unless a password is used which can bring the player back to a point after the weapon was acquired) or when the game is completed.
- Donkey Kong: The hammer that Mario (Jumpman) can use to destroy barrels and fireballs.
- Pac-Man: Power pellets can be picked up by Pac-Man, allowing him to attack ghosts. This also makes Pac-Man temporarily invulnerable.
- Mario: The player can smash overhead bricks by jumping into them after picking up a Super Mushroom, and can throw fireballs at enemies after picking up a Fire Flower. In addition to those two, there are Ice Flowers, Mega Mushrooms, Super Bells, Super Hammers, etc. Mario loses the Super Mario effect after being hit; if he has also collected a Fire Flower, then this is lost along with it.
- Jak and Daxter: In the first game, collecting Red Eco increases Jak's attack power, while Yellow Eco gives the ability to shoot fireballs from his hands. In the next two games, Dark Eco can be used to transform into Dark Jak, giving a more powerful melee attack, and access to additional unlockable abilities.
- Doom: In secret areas, the player can find Berserk packs that greatly increases the damage from Doomguy's fist, allowing him to kill most of the weaker enemies in one or two hits without spending any ammunition.
- Astro Bot: The Twin-Frog Gloves allow Astro Bot to use spring-loaded punches, which let him defeat enemies from afar.

=== Defensive ===
Defensive power-ups typically consist of items like shields (usually a "force field") surrounding the character that deflects projectiles or absorbs a certain amount of damage, or invincibility/invulnerability. In the case of invincibility, this is nearly always granted as a temporary bonus; otherwise it would negate the challenge of the game.

Invincibility (or "invulnerability") comes in two main forms: either the player character merely becomes intangible to harmful things, or can also damage enemies by contact. In either case the character is often still vulnerable to some threats, such as bottomless pits. In many games, invulnerability is also temporarily granted after the player gets hit or loses a life, so that the character will not be hurt/killed twice in quick succession. The effect is commonly indicated by making the player character flash or blink or by musical cues.

- Mario: The Starman, which grants temporary invulnerability and the ability to defeat enemies by touch.
- Sonic the Hedgehog: There are several kinds of defensive power-ups in the Sonic franchise. The first game introduced the Shield, which would protect Sonic from being hit one time. This would prevent the player from losing Rings and lives, enclosing Sonic in a spherical barrier. There are several variations of this item as well, including the Thunder/Magnetic, Aqua/Water, and Fire/Flame Shields. These games also feature the Invincibility box which grants temporary invulnerability, and the ability to defeat enemies by simply touching them.
- Blur: This game also features defensive power-ups like shield and repair to prevent the player's car from getting wrecked. Some power-ups can be fired backwards to destroy opponents behind the player.
- Clash of Clans: The Grand Warden's Eternal Tome ability makes all surrounding friendly units with a certain range to be invulnerable to damage from defense towers for several seconds.
- Splatoon series: The Armor power-up coats the player in one layer of armor and prevents enemy attacks from "splatting" the player. If the player takes enough damage that would otherwise splat them, a layer of armor breaks while the player is restored to full health and given a short period of invulnerability. Unlike most defensive power-ups, the player can have multiple layers of armor at once.

=== Evasive ===
Some power-ups consist of items which help the player avoid or escape enemies or enemy weapons. This category includes "speed boosts" and other power-ups which affect time, which can be temporary, permanent, or cumulative, and "invisibility" power-ups which help the player avoid enemies.

- Rainbow Islands: The shoe power-up, which makes the player character move more quickly.
- R-Type: The 'S' icon, which increases the player's speed every time one is collected.
- Unreal Tournament, Quake I & II: The Invisibility power-up, which turns the player into an indistinct wireframe or shadow. Similarly, radiation suits serve to deflect certain types of weapons as well.
- Crisis Core: Final Fantasy VII: The Dash materia allows Zack Fair to move at double speed to help avoid enemy attacks.
- Jak and Daxter: The Blue Eco, which enables Jak to run faster and jump higher. It is also used to activate the ancient Precursor machinery found throughout the world, opening doors and activating floating platforms. Due to this, Blue Eco can also be considered an Access ability.
- Sonic the Hedgehog: The Power Sneakers/Speed Shoes item in this series temporarily increases the speed, accelerations and jump height of the player character.
- Super Metroid: The Speed Booster is a permanent power-up that gives Samus Aran the ability to run incredibly fast, destroying any enemy in her path. She can also perform a technique with the Speed Booster called the "Shinespark", which allows her to do an invincible charge in 6 possible directions, at the cost of draining health.
- Astro Bot: The Time-Stopper is a power-up that allows Astro Bot to slow down time for approximately five seconds, before it has to recharge. This lets him evade enemy attacks, as well as traversing platforms that move too fast for him to normally cross.

=== Access abilities ===
Some power-ups help the player enter new or previously inaccessible areas, or "warp" to another level. Access abilities, depending on the game, can be required to progress normally or be entirely optional.

- Mario: The warp whistle, which allows players to first go to a warp zone, then advance to another world of a higher value, and the hammer, which allows players to take shortcuts on the overworld game map. Mario can also acquire a Raccoon Leaf which allows him to fly, sometimes to hidden areas. There is also the Mini Mushroom, which shrinks Mario to a smaller size and allows players to enter small pipes.
- Mega Man series: The Rush power-ups allow the player to attain power-ups not possible by any other means. The most common are Rush Jet, Rush Coil, Rush Marine, and Rush Search. Also notable are some of the capsule upgrades in the X spin-off series.
- Metroid series: Various weapons (such as the Ice Beam and the Power Bomb) are permanent power-ups that give Samus Aran additional offensive capability and access to various doors.

=== Health ===
Health-restorative power-ups typically consist of items which restore lost health (most typically in medical kits, food, or as energy), or items which increase health capacity and 1-ups (which give an extra chance to continue playing after losing, commonly called a 'life').

- Mario: The Super Mushrooms and 1-up Mushrooms give Mario the ability to take an extra hit and extra lives (respectively).
- Wonder Boy: Fruits recharge the continuously dwindling player energy.
- Doom: First aid kits restore part of the player's health.
- The Legend of Zelda: The heart containers permanently increase the player's total health capacity, while heart power ups each refill one heart container worth of lost health.
- Jak and Daxter: Green Eco, the most common type of Eco in the game, restores Jak's health.
- Clash of Clans: The Healing Spell causes all friendly troops (ground or air) to regain some health depending on the level each pulse (for forty pulses) in 12 seconds.
- Sonic the Hedgehog: The Extra Life box, represented in earlier games with an icon of the character the player is controlling, and in later titles by an icon reading "1-up", grants an extra life whenever it is collected.

=== Ammunition and power ===
In some games, using certain items or abilities requires the expenditure of a resource such as ammunition, fuel or magic points. Some games use a single resource, such as magic points, while others use multiple resources, such as several types of ammunition. Some games also have power ups which increase the player's maximum ammunition or power capacity.

- Half-Life: Ammunition for guns.
- The Legend of Zelda: Ocarina of Time: Obtaining "Magic Jars" restores magic points, which are expended by many items and other special abilities.
- Descent 2: Energy power-ups restore energy, which is required to fire most primary weapons, and to use some other equipment such as the headlight and afterburner.
- Mega Man: While the default weapon has an unlimited number of shots, the other six weapons can only be fired by expending 'weapon energy', of which each weapon has its own separate reserve. Obtaining a 'weapon capsule' recharges a portion of the currently selected weapon's energy.
- Monster Legends: Monsters have a certain amount of stamina depending on their rarity. Most attacks cost stamina, which is replenished by either using up a turn to regain 50% stamina or by using certain moves that restore stamina. Monsters can also equip relics that restore stamina when certain conditions are met.

=== Token abilities ===
Other power-ups consist of items whose main feature is that they are found in large numbers, to encourage the player to reach certain spots in the game world. They have various cumulative effects, often granting the hero an extra life.

- Super Mario Bros.: Collecting 100 coins grants the player an extra life.
- Super Mario Bros. 2: Collecting 5 cherries causes a Starman powerup to float up from the bottom of the screen.
- Sonic the Hedgehog: Collecting at least one ring lets the player take a hit at the cost of losing all rings. Collecting 100 rings grants the player an extra life.
  - Additionally, in many games in the series, acquiring all seven Chaos Emeralds and collecting at least 50 rings allows the player to activate Super Sonic mode, which grants flight, increased speed and invulnerability to most forms of damage, but gradually consuming rings over time, and expires when the player runs out of rings.
- Crash Bandicoot: Collecting 100 Wumpa fruits grants the player an extra life.
- Donkey Kong Country: Collecting 100 bananas grants the player an extra life.

=== Tricks ===
Trick power-ups try to trick the player into grabbing them, only to result usually into damage, removed abilities, or player death.

- Super Mario Bros.: The Lost Levels: Poison Mushrooms resemble Super Mushrooms, but they harm the player on contact instead.
- Bonk's Revenge: Fake power-up containers that actually release an enemy.
- Sonic 3/Sonic & Knuckles/Sonic 3 & Knuckles: Item Monitors that bear Eggman/Robotnik on them will cause Sonic to be hurt if he opens them.
- Metroid Fusion: Some Energy or Missile Tanks are actually enemies in disguise, and usually lead to a room with the real power-up.
- Rise of the Triad: Items like the Shrooms and Elasto reduces the player control.

=== Selection bar ===
Gradius selection bar

Instead of having players collect a power-up that is instantly activated, the players may be allowed to select which power-ups they want to use. This is commonly implemented through a 'selection bar' which contains a number of power-up effects. To access the bar, the player must collect power-up items; the more they collect, the further along the bar they can access. The more powerful power-ups are traditionally placed further along the bar, so that more effort is required to obtain them. The selection bar was first used in Konami's 1985 game, Gradius.

=== Perks ===
Perks are a variation of the power-up mechanic, but permanent rather than temporary. The concept of permanent power-ups dates back to the early NES action RPGs, Deadly Towers (1986) and Rygar (1987), which blurred the line between the power-ups used in action-adventures and the experience points used in console RPGs. An early video game that used perks, and named it as such, was the 1997 computer RPG game Fallout. Perks have been used in various other video games in recent times, including first-person shooters such as Call of Duty 4: Modern Warfare, Modern Warfare 2, and Killing Floor, as well as action games like Metal Gear Online.
