= Rotary switch =

Type of mechanical device

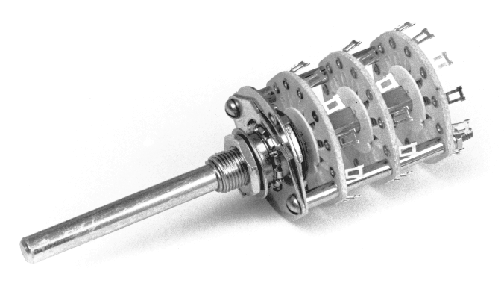
Three-deck rotary switch allows controlling three different circuit functions.

A rotary switch is a switch operated by rotation. These are often chosen when more than 2 positions are needed, such as a three-speed fan or a CB radio with multiple frequencies of reception or "channels".

A rotary switch consists of a spindle or "rotor" that has a contact arm or "spoke" which projects from its surface like a cam. It has an array of terminals, arranged in a circle around the rotor, each of which serves as a contact for the "spoke" through which any one of a number of different electrical circuits can be connected to the rotor. The switch is layered to allow the use of multiple poles; each layer is equivalent to one pole. Alternatively the rotation can be limited to a fraction (half; third etc.) of a circle and then each layer can have multiple (two; three etc.) poles. Usually, such a switch has a detent mechanism so it "clicks" from one active position to another rather than stalls in an intermediate position. Thus a rotary switch provides greater pole and throw capabilities than simpler switches do.

Rotary switches were used as channel selectors on television receivers until the early 1970s, as range selectors on electrical metering equipment, as band selectors on multi-band radios, etc.

Modern rotary switches use a "star wheel" mechanism to provide the switching positions, such as at every 30, 45, 60, or 90 degrees. Nylon cams are then mounted behind this mechanism and spring-loaded electrical contacts slide around these cams. The cams are notched or cut where the contact should close to complete an electrical circuit.

Some rotary switches are user-configurable in relation to the number of positions. A special toothed washer that sits below the holding nut can be positioned so that the tooth is inserted into one of a number of slots in a way that limits the number of positions available for selection. For example, if only four positions are required on a twelve position switch, the washer can be positioned so that only four switching positions can be selected when in use.

== Gallery ==
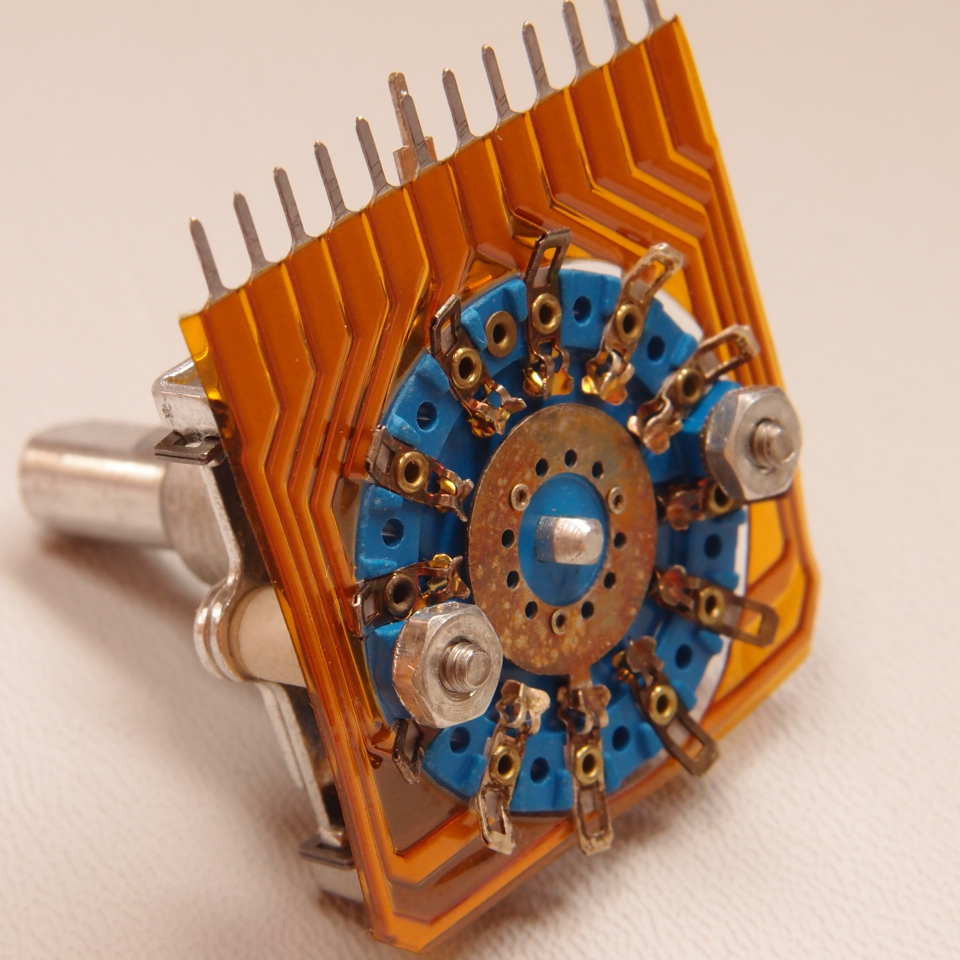
Bottom view of a 12-position rotary switch showing wiper and contacts

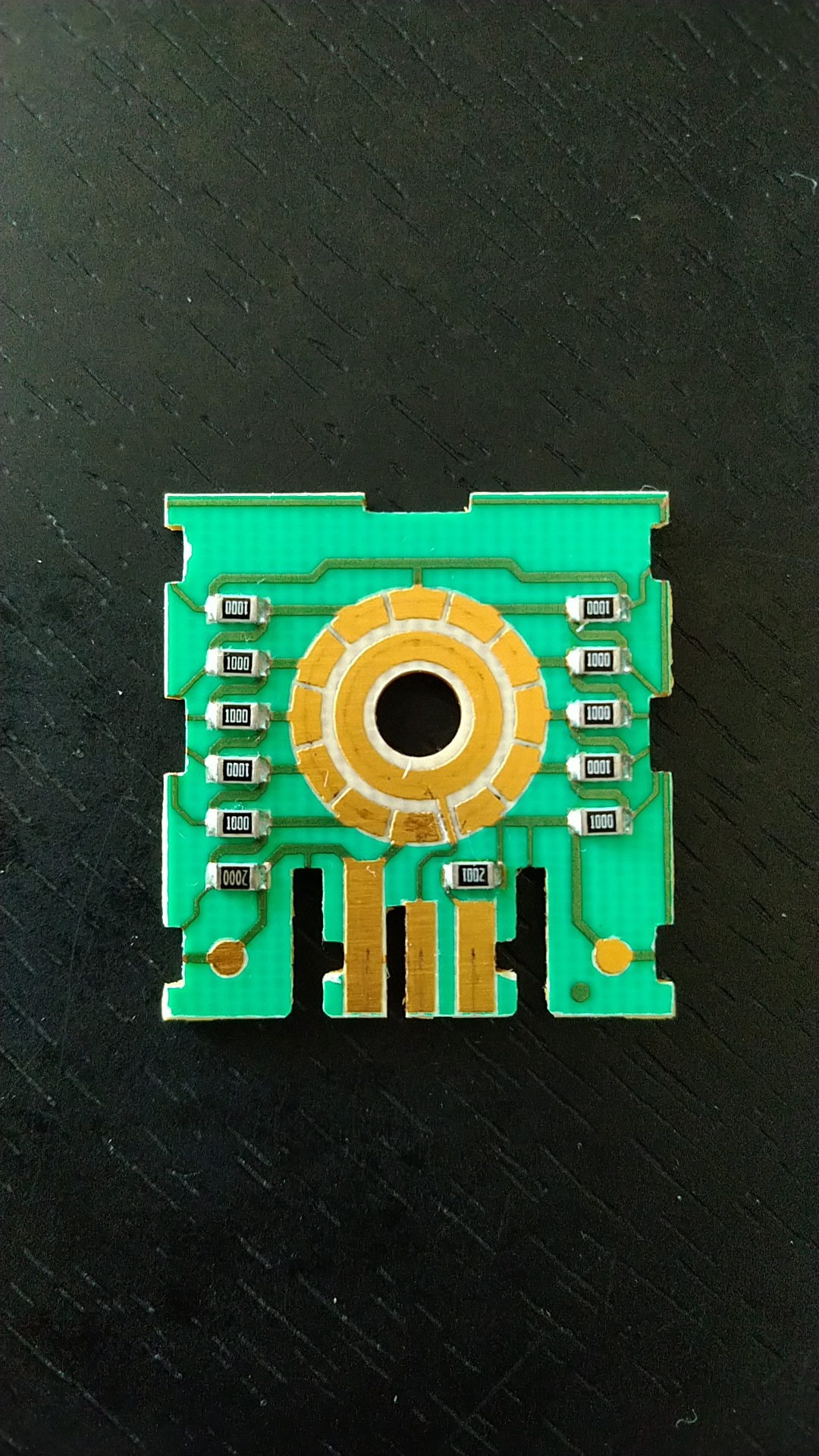
Rotary switch circuit

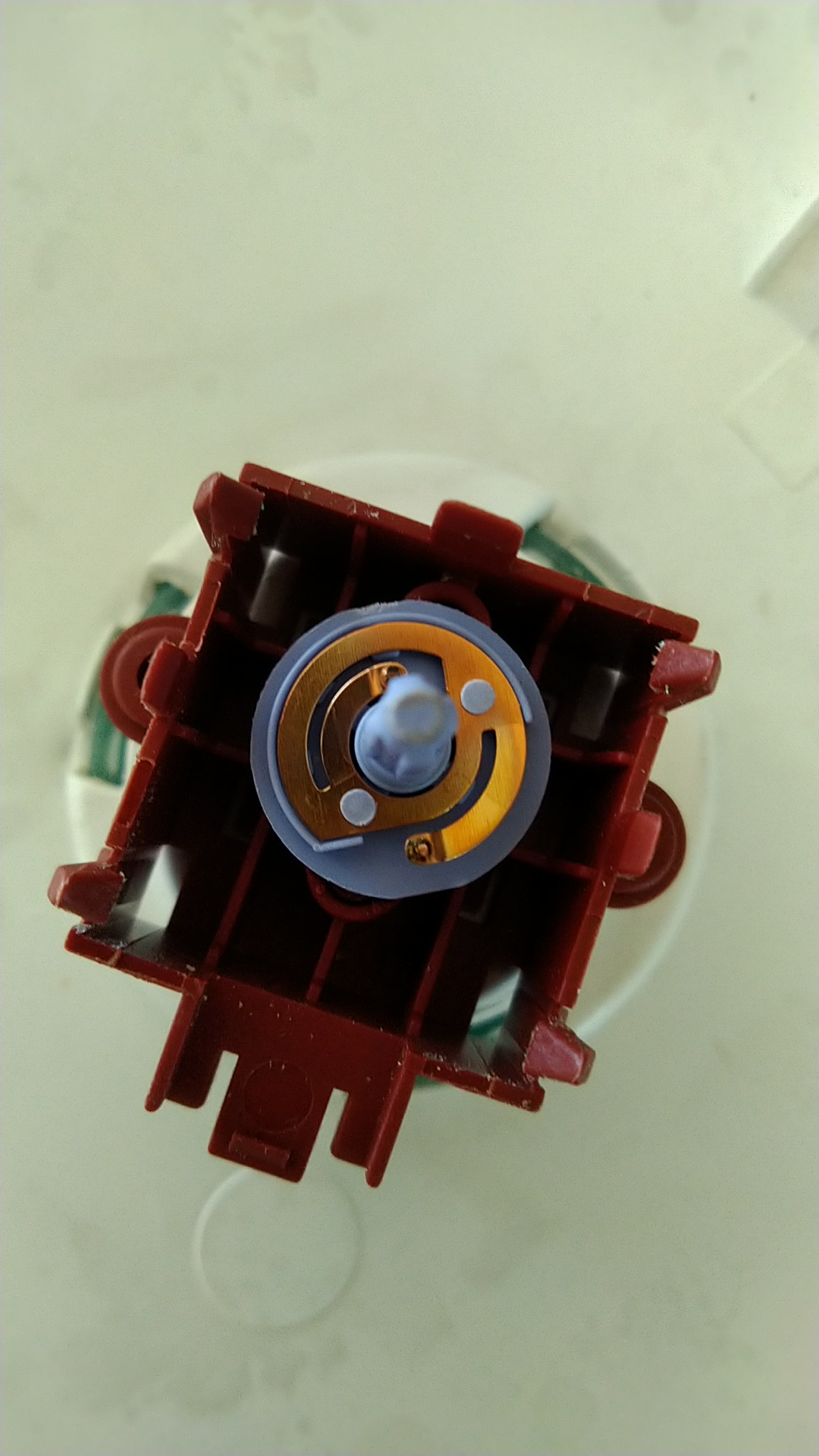
Rotary switch handle as seen from below

Schematic symbol for 1P3T, break-before-make, nonshorting style

Schematic symbol for 1P4T, break-before-make, nonshorting style

Schematic symbol for 1P4T, make-before-break, shorting style

== See also ==
- Commutator (electric) – Device for changing direction of current
- Control knob – Rotary device used to operate mechanical or electrical device system
- Rotary encoder – Electromechanical device
- Rotary system – Electromechanical telephone switch
- Stepping switch – Electromechanical multi-pole switch controlled by a chain of pulses
